= Honor Diaries =

- Directed by: Micah Smith
- Written by: Paula Kweskin; Alex Traiman
- Produced by: Paula Kweskin; Heidi Basch-Harod; Alex Traiman
- Cinematography: Micah Smith
- Edited by: Micah Smith
- Music by: Sharon Farber
- Distributed by: Brainstorm Media
- Release date: 2013
- Running time: 60 min.
- Country: United States
- Language: English

Honor Diaries is a 2013 documentary film that explores violence against women in honor-based societies, with particular focus on female genital mutilation (FGM), violence against women and honor killings and forced marriage, and lack of access to education.

The film profiles nine women’s rights activists with origins in the Muslim (and non-Muslim) world, and follows their efforts to effect change, both within their communities and beyond. Honor Diaries premiered at the Chicago International Film Festival in October 2013 and won the Interfaith Award for Best Documentary at the St. Louis International Film Festival in November 2013. It was featured from December 2013 through April 2014 on DirecTV’s Audience Network as part of the Something to Talk About film series.

== Content ==
=== Synopsis ===
Honor Diaries traces the work of nine women’s rights advocates who came together to engage in a discourse about gender inequality and honor-based violence. Combining in-depth interviews and round-table discussions with archival footage, the film examines human rights violations in honor-based societies, and the growing trend of honor crimes in Western societies.

=== Structure ===
Honor Diaries is divided into five main sections. The film begins with a broad analysis of women’s rights in Muslim-majority countries, drawing attention to issues such as lack of access to education and restrictions on movement. From there, the film expands on three major crimes targeting women: forced marriage, honor killings and female genital mutilation (FGM). In the final chapter, the documentary explores the rising trend of honor-based violence in Western societies, and efforts to silence voices of opposition by intimidation.

=== Featured interviewees ===
The film features in-depth interviews with eleven women who represent diverse communities throughout the Muslim and non-Muslim world. The women reside in the United Kingdom, the United States, Canada and Sudan. In the documentary, the featured women share their stories from their personal lives, professional work and their struggle to fight for broad-scale change.

- Nazanin Afshin-Jam
- Nazie Eftekhari
- Manda Zand Ervin
- Fahima Hashim
- Zainab Khan
- Raheel Raza
- Jasvinder Sanghera
- Ayaan Hirsi Ali
- Qanta Ahmed
- Raquel Saraswati
- Juliana Taimoorazy

== Production ==
Film production began in April 2012, prompted by producer Paula Kweskin’s participation in the Association for Women's Rights in Development conference in Turkey. There, Kweskin was introduced to numerous women’s rights activists, including Fahima Hashim, Director of the Salmmah Women’s Resource Center in Sudan and one of the featured women in Honor Diaries.

The nine women who are profiled in the film met for the first time at a gathering in June 2012 in New York. The film’s producers based the concept of the meeting on the salons of the French Enlightenment, in which women hosted assemblies of intellectuals to discuss progressive issues of the day. Subsequently, producers filmed women separately, in their home towns.

After more than a year in production, the film was completed in May 2013.

=== Filmmakers ===
- Producer and writer of Honor Diaries, Paula Kweskin, is an Israeli human rights attorney specializing in humanitarian law. She received her J.D. from the University of North Carolina-Chapel Hill, and is a member of the New York Bar. Honor Diaries is Kweskin’s first film.
- Co-Producer Heidi Basch-Harod is the Executive Director of Women’s Voices Now. She is the author and editor of numerous print and online articles and op-eds that examine the rights of women in the Middle East and North Africa.
- Executive Producer Ayaan Hirsi Ali is a two-time New York Times bestselling author for her works Infidel and Nomad, and is the founder of the AHA Foundation.
- Director and Editor, Micah Smith. His documentaries have screened in more than 40 film festivals worldwide.
- Producer and Writer, Alex Traiman. Traiman directed Iranium.
- Executive Producer Raphael Shore is an Israeli filmmaker who has produced other films such as Obsession: Radical Islam’s War Against the West, The Third Jihad: Radical Islam's Vision For America, and Iranium.

=== Coalition partners ===
The film website claims the following organizations have supported the promotion and distribution of Honor Diaries:

- AHA Foundation
- All Afghan Women's Union
- Alliance of Iranian Women
- American Islamic Forum for Democracy
- Americans Overseas Domestic Violence Crisis Center
- A Call To Men
- Breakthrough
- Canadian Women for Women in Afghanistan
- Canadian Women's Foundation
- The Clarion Project
- Congress of Racial Equality
- Cooperation Center for Afghanistan
- Council for Muslims Facing Tomorrow
- Fistula Foundation
- FORWARD
- Girls' Globe
- Karma Nirvana
- LIBFORALL
- Men Can Stop Rape
- The MILLA Project
- Nika Water
- SAFSS
- Shuhada Organization
- Tehrik-e-Niswan
- Women’s Voices Now
- World Pulse

== Release and reception ==
Honor Diaries premiered at the Chicago International Film Festival in October 2013. One month later, the film screened at the St. Louis International Film Festival, where it won the Interfaith Award for Best Documentary. It featured throughout December 2013 on DirecTV’s Something to Talk About film series on the Audience network (Channel 239).

The international launch of Honor Diaries coincided with International Women’s Day on March 8, 2014.

=== Media reception ===
- Make no mistake: The work of the nine activists featured in [Honor Diaries] is extremely important as they fight for women’s rights.
  — Los Angeles Times / Red Eye Review
- [Honor Diaries] consists of a roundtable discussion by nine courageous and highly articulate women of different ages, all from Muslim majority countries …. They speak eloquently, with reasoned passion, about their personal experiences and of threats against them, and talk of their efforts to change the situation of women in their country of origin and in the wider world.
  — The Commentator
- Lisa De Bode, writing in Al Jazeera America, said "The film alternates between opinions from self-proclaimed experts and ominous statistics and vignettes about gender-based violence." and discussed the differing views expressed by commentators, ranging from a statement from the Council on American–Islamic Relations that the producers are "seeking to hijack a legitimate issue to promote its anti-Muslim agenda” to support by participants in the film, mentioning that Qanta Ahmed says in the field that female genital mutilation "is not advocated in Islam in any way" although it is practiced in some Muslim societies.

=== Awards ===
Honor Diaries won the Interfaith Award at the St. Louis International Film Festival in 2013.

The film was nominated for a 2015 Islamophobia award, with the nomination stating it "portrays Muslims societies as misogynistic, backward, and dominated by brutal practices that oppress women and stifle [sic] debate around practices".

== See also ==
- Duma (2011 film)
