= Center for Islamic Pluralism =

U.S.-based Islamic think tank

- Abbreviation: CIP
- Formation: 2004, opened in 2005
- Legal status: Public charity
- Headquarters: Washington, D.C.
- Executive Director: Stephen Suleyman Schwartz
- President: Kemal Silay
- Subsidiaries: in London, UK and Cologne, Germany
- Website: islamicpluralism.org

The Center for Islamic Pluralism (CIP) is a U.S.-based Islamic think tank challenging Islamist interpretations of Islam. It was founded in 2004 by eight people including the Sufi Muslim author Stephen Suleyman Schwartz and officially opened on March 25, 2005. With its headquarters in Washington, D.C., it has subsidiaries in London and Cologne, Germany and correspondents in 32 countries.

== Founders ==
- Kemal Silay, professor at Indiana University (CIP president)
- Lulu Schwartz (CIP executive director)
- Nawab Agha, chairman of the American Muslim Congress (CIP Shia affairs director)
- Zuhdi Jasser, chairman of the American Islamic Forum for Democracy
- Ahmed Subhy Mansour, former professor, Al-Azhar University, Cairo
- Salim Mansur, professor at University of Western Ontario (CIP Canadian director)
- Khaleel Mohammed, assistant profressor at San Diego State University
- Tashbih Sayyed, publisher of Muslim World Today

== Other staff ==
- Dr. Irfan al-Alawi, CIP International Director
- Veli Sirin, CIP Germany Director
- Kamal Hasani, CIP General Studies Director
- Daut Dauti, CIP UK Research Director
- Jalal Zuberi, CIP Southern U.S. Director
- Imaad Malik, CIP Prison Outreach Director
