= The Third Jihad: Radical Islam's Vision For America =

The Third Jihad
- Film poster
- Directed by: Wayne Kopping; Erik Werth
- Story by: Wayne Kopping; Michael Pace; Raphael Shore; Erik Werth
- Produced by: Erik Werth; Raphael Shore
- Narrated by: Dr. M. Zuhdi Jasser
- Edited by: Wayne Kopping
- Music by: Alun Richards
- Production company: Public Scope Films
- Distributed by: Gallagher Entertainment
- Release date: 2008
- Running time: 72 minutes
- Country: United States
- Languages: English; Arabic; Persian

The Third Jihad: Radical Islam's Vision For America is a 2008 documentary style film directed by Wayne Kopping of South Africa and Erik Werth. It was produced by Werth and Raphael Shore, a Canadian-Israeli, with financing from the Clarion Project, an organization described by the Southern Poverty Law Center as an anti-Muslim group.

The film dwells on the idea of an alleged threat to the United States by radical Islam using a Muslim Brotherhood document accepted as evidence in the 2007 Holy Land Foundation for Relief and Development terror financing trial. Based on the document, the filmmakers contend that radical Islamists are engaging in a "multifaceted strategy to overcome the western world," waging a "cultural jihad" to "infiltrate and undermine our society from within". The film is narrated by Dr. M. Zuhdi Jasser, a controversial Muslim American.

The film later created widespread controversy when media discovered that it was being shown to New York Police Department recruits purportedly as a training video.

== Production ==
Raphael Shore, producer of Obsession: Radical Islam's War Against the West, and founder of the Clarion Fund is the producer of The Third Jihad. The film was directed and edited by Wayne Kopping, who was also the Director, Editor, and Co-Writer of Obsession. Co-Directing and Co-Producing the film was Erik Werth . The film is narrated by American Muslim Dr. M. Zuhdi Jasser.

The film uses video clips from American Broadcasting Company (ABC), Fox News Channel, MSNBC, CNN, As-Sahab media production house of the Al-Qaeda terrorist organization, Christian Broadcasting Network (CBN), Islamic Republic of Iran News Network (IRINN), Al-Aqsa TV and other non-specified news outlets.

== Synopsis ==
According to the filmmakers website, the film "reveals that radical Islamists driven by a religiously motivated rejection of western values cultures and religion are engaging in a multifaceted strategy to overcome the western world." In contrast to the concept of violent jihad, the filmmakers introduce the concept of "cultural jihad as a means to infiltrate and undermine our society from within." The overriding theme from their perspective is how this "cultural jihad" is a threat to United States national security. The film contains excerpts of speeches by Islamic organizations and terrorist groups, includes interviews with government officials, interspersed with footage of terrorist attacks, human rights violations, and growing support of jihadist movements. A distinction is drawn between radical Islam and Islam as a whole. An article in The New York Times states that " portrays many mainstream American Muslim leaders as closet radical Islamists, and states that their “primary tactic” is deception.".

Persons interviewed in the film include: former Secretary of Homeland Security Tom Ridge, former New York Mayor Rudy Giuliani, resident fellow at the American Enterprise Institute Ayaan Hirsi Ali, Director of the American Center for Democracy Rachel Ehrenfeld, founder and president of the Alliance of Iranian Women Manda Zand Ervin, former Jammaa Islameia terrorist Dr. Tawfik Hamid, British columnist and author Melanie Phillips, Cleveland E. Dodge Professor Emeritus of Near Eastern Studies at Princeton University Bernard Lewis, Wayne Simmons, founder of the American Islamic Forum for Democracy (AIFD) Dr. M. Zuhdi Jasser, Senior Fellow at the Foundation for the Defense of Democracies Walid Phares, head of Masjid Al Islam mosque in Washington, DC Imam Abdul Alim Musa, Connecticut Senator Joe Lieberman, former CIA Intelligence Expert Clare Lopez, FBI Assistant Director for Public Affairs John Miller, President of the National Ten Point Leadership Foundation Rev. Eugene Rivers, journalist and author Mark Steyn, former CIA Director during the Clinton Administration Jim Woolsey, and Police Commissioner of New York City Raymond Kelly.

== Use by NYPD for training ==
The film was used to train New York Police Department officers during required counterterrorism training. One officer who viewed the film at an NYPD training facility stated "It was so ridiculously one-sided, it just made Muslims look like the enemy. It was straight propaganda". Members of the City Council, civil rights advocates, and Muslim leaders objected to the Department's use of the film. Deputy Commissioner Paul Browne said that it "never should have shown to officers," stating "it was reviewed and found to be inappropriate."

In January 2012, The New York Times reported that documents obtained under the Freedom of Information Act indicated that 1,498 officers viewed the film during the period it was used for training. Police Commissioner of New York City Raymond Kelly, who was interviewed in the film, later stated he considered that decision a mistake and called the film "objectionable."

== Promotion and endorsements ==
Fox News Channel Hannity showed a preview of the film live on December 22, 2009. The Third Jihad received endorsements from former New York City mayor Rudolph Giuliani, U.S. Senator Jon Kyl, U.S. Representatives Trent Franks and Sue Myrick, among others.
