= Mohammad Tawhidi =

Australian Shia Muslim commentator (born c. 1982)

- محمد التوحيدي
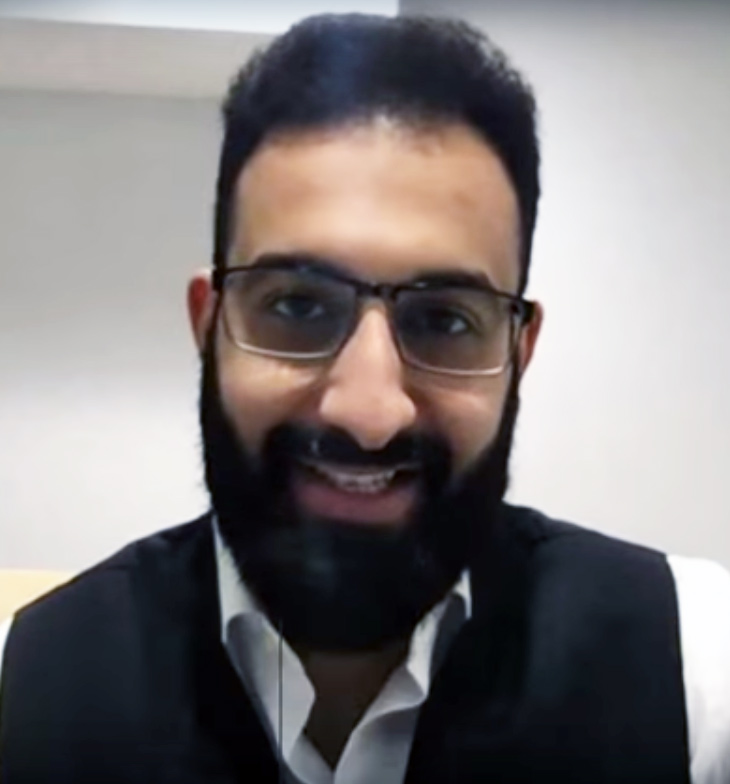
- Tawhidi in 2019
- Born: 1982 or 1983 (age 43–44); Qom, Iran
- Website: imamtawhidi.com

Mohammad Tawhidi (born 1982 or 1983), who calls himself the "Imam of Peace", is an Australian Shia Muslim commentator and self-described imam who divides his time between Canada and the Middle East.

Tawhidi is known for his outspoken opposition to Islamic extremism, political Islam, and terrorism, as well as for advocating reform within Islam grounded in what he describes as its original ethical principles. He has condemned jihadist violence and groups, rejects the use of religion to justify coercion or violence, and promotes reinterpretations of Islamic texts that align with human rights, democratic values, and peaceful coexistence with non-Muslim societies. He has taken public positions in favor of women's rights, opposing compulsory veiling, domestic violence, polygyny, child marriage, female genital multilation, and the killing or punishment of apostates, and has called for women's participation in Islamic religious leadership.

Tawhidi's views have drawn both support and criticism, particularly within Muslim communities, and some of his statements have been positively received by Western far-right (Note: Sources describing support for Tawhidi from far-right groups:) and Islamophobic groups. (Note: Sources describing support for Tawhidi from Islamophobic groups:)

== Early life and education ==
Tawhidi is a Shia Muslim, and was born in 1982 or 1983 in Qom, Iran, to Iraqi parents, who emigrated to Australia with his family to escape persecution under President Saddam Hussein.

According to his office's website, Mohammad Tawhidi is a Shia scholar of Iraqi descent and a third-generation imam. He was ordained by the Grand Ayatollah Sadiq al-Shirazi and certified by the “Al-Rasul Seminary School in Qom and the Islamic Seminary of Karbala,” certifying competence and suitability for entrusted roles.” A report by the ABC News stated that "Tawhidi is not recognised as an Imam or Sheikh by either the Australian National Imams Council or its South Australian equivalent, nor is he affiliated with any Australian mosque or prayer centre."

In 2009, he enrolled in a bachelors program in Islamic studies at Al-Mustafa University in Qom, but withdrew in 2012 for ideological reasons. Tawhidi became disillusioned with anti-Western views during his time at Al-Mustafa and decided to leave the institution.

He shifted his focus to addressing challenges within Islam through media, where his statements have drawn both support and criticism. Tawhidi advocates for reinterpreting Islamic texts in ways that align with modern human rights and societal values. He encourages scholars to adopt a flexible and contextual approach to help reduce extremism and foster better relationships with Western societies. He later co-founded Imam Hussein TV 3.

In 2015, he returned to Australia, and lived there until 2024. He is fluent in Arabic, English, and Persian.

== Views ==
Tawhidi had earlier held Sadiq Hussaini Shirazi as his marja taqlid. Since 2015, Tawhidi has stated that he does not subscribe to any particular religious leader. There have been marked differences between his and Shirazi's views on a host of issues.

Tawhidi is the former president of the Islamic Association of South Australia, which he founded in 2016.

=== Islam ===
Tawhidi believes that Muslim societies should move away from extremist teachings and focus on reform. As an originalist, he advocates for restoring Islam to its core principles of worship and good deeds. He deems all acts of terrorism to be condemned in the Quran, and denounced extremist groups and ideologies such as the Islamic State and the Iranian regime as a political movement, not representative of the religion.

In June 2017, after the jihadi terrorist attack in London, he described extremism as a "cancer" to the religion. He is critical of the treatment of women in some Muslim-majority countries, has called for the appointment of women to the Australian National Imams Council, and has rejected the compulsory wearing of the hijab in public. Tawhidi also opposes Muslims justifying domestic violence, polygamy and the killing of apostates on Islamic, jurisprudential, or legal grounds.

Tawhidi supports educational systems that promote intellectual freedom, critical thinking about religious texts, and the inclusion of science and philosophy alongside religious studies.

=== Sectarianism ===
Critics have accused Tawhidi of only criticizing Sunni Muslims. Zuhdi Jasser, writing an op-ed for Asia Times Online, said that Tawhidi only criticised Sunni Islamists and never Islamists within his own community such as the Iran regime; (Note: Tawhidi has however criticised Iran for imprisoning scholars critical of government, and stated the people of Iran regularly witness "waves of oppression, torture and lack of human rights.") in essence, he was not a reformist but a Shia radical. However, Tawhidi has criticized the Iranian regime's treatment of minors, saying it goes against international child protection standards and some Islamic teachings.

Chloe Patton, in a piece for the ABC, referred to Tawhidi as a "Shia extremist" and accused him of waging a "sectarian war against Australia's majority Sunni community." Patton referred to Tawhidi's comments to Andrew Bolt that Sahih al-Bukhari, a sacred Sunni text, should be banned. Paul Barry, presenter of Media Watch, made mention of Tawhidi calling sacred Sunni texts "monkey teachings", and describing Sunnis as "followers of an alcoholic, rapist caliph." (Note: However, on occasions, Tawhidi has promoted unity amongst Muslim sects and opposed sectarianism in Islam. In June 2016, he began Ramadan by visiting an Ahmadiyya mosque and paid his respects to the community. In a piece for The Huffington Post, he states that Muslim sects and divisions become irrelevant during serious matters of national safety.)

Tawhidi maintains a nuanced view about the Bukhari, stating that some of the views, actions, and opinions cited by Bukhari are presented as statements by the prophet, but should only be attributable to the companions of the Prophet or and other individuals. As such, the Corpus of Bukhari can and has been misinterpreted and distorted by Shia and Sunni extremists to justify violence. Tawhidi often highlights controversial fatwas (Islamic legal opinions) issued by certain religious authorities, in order to show how some interpretations of Islamic law can be extreme, nonsensical, or even harmful.

=== Political views ===
Tawhidi's political views reflect his rejection of those seeking to corrupt Islam for political gain. Tawhidi is a critic of Islamic terrorism and radicalism, often condemning acts of violence committed in the name of Islam. His statements, however, do not always find support among fellow Muslims, as they often touch on sensitive topics.

Tawhidi supports limiting the building of mosques that promote hate and extremism. He maintains that a maligned interpretation of the corpus has been used as an ideological underpinning for terrorism. In this spirit, he advocates for the deportation of radical Islamic leaders (Hizbut Tahrir, ISIS, and others) from Australia.

Tawhidi opposes Islamist ideologies, curricula, and institutions that distort the fundamental tenets and texts of Islam to promote extremism. He believes that institutions that govern Halal certification and educate Muslim youth must be led by individuals who respect and promote the peaceful nature of Islam. As such, Tawhidi has claimed that the agencies that controls halal certification to threaten the Australian way of life.

Tawhidi was and remains very supportive of the establishment of new Islamic schools with peace-based curricula and Halal certification by moderate Islamic authorities. Tawhidi claimed that after presenting these ideas, he received threats from ISIS operatives in Australia, and that his car was vandalized, with “ISIS” cut into the side of the vehicle and the seats slashed. He was escorted to a safe house by the Police, for fear of retribution by the Muslim community. However, a police spokesperson told The Australian that "there have been no incidents relating to the removal of a person from a mosque or similar place."

While living in Australia, he advocated for better integration of Muslims into Australian society and encouraged stronger collaboration between Islamic leaders and the government, emphasizing that this is key to fostering positive relations with the Muslim community.

In August 2019, upon India revoking the special status of Jammu and Kashmir, Tawhidi said that he rejects the knee-jerk and absolute dismissal of India's claim over Kashmir and believes that it should be jointly governed due to the large Hindu and Muslim populations therein. He advanced the position that Pakistani leader, Imran Khan, should respect the rights of religious minorities in Pakistan since the territory used to belong to India and is therefore diverse.

While he does not advocate for the expansion of current Israeli territory, he is on the record as stating that the territory claimed by Palestine along with Lebanon, Jordan, Northern Egypt, Syria, and Jewish land is established as holy by the Quran. He maintained that the Israeli-Palestinian conflict has been driven in part by religious opposition to Jewish sovereignty, arguing that the reaction would likely have been different had Israel been established as a Christian or even a communist state rather than a Jewish one. He has rejected claims that the territory is exclusively Palestinian or Muslim, contending that recognition of Jewish historical claims is consistent with Islam and essential to achieving peace. According to fact-checking website Misbar, extremist Zionists engage with Tawhidi's social media posts.

On homosexuality, Tawhidi has stated that he opposes hatred, violence and discrimination against homosexuals, supports the protection of their human rights, and believes that the legality of same-sex marriage should be determined by the laws of the country in which a person lives.

== Media attention ==
Tawhidi's views have sparked both support and criticism, with some praising his efforts to promote dialogue and reform, while others accuse him of misrepresenting Islam. He continues to advocate for a peaceful and cooperative understanding of the religion.

In March 2016, Tawhidi released a statement concerning a man who was released on bail after allegedly grabbing a woman's headscarf on a bus in Adelaide. He warned that intolerance could cause tension and harm the dignity of Australian women, adding that while a man might legally qualify for bail, it might not be the right decision ethically. He also expressed concern that such incidents could lead to negative reactions from the Muslim community, which leaders are working to make more tolerant. His statement also said that the Australian Government should review its laws on female headscarves was misinterpreted by ABC Australia. While he rejected the idea of compulsory headscarves for women, he advocated for stricter laws that would protect Muslim women and mothers in Australia. Tawhidi said that the consistent misinterpretation of his statements and positions by local media outlets inspired him to found the "Imams for Peace" organization.

Later in 2016, he attended the World Alliance of Religions for Peace (WARP) Summit in South Korea, hosted by Lee Man-hee. The WARP Summit coincided with the birthday of Lee Man-hee. Tawhidi was supportive of the event and was quoted as saying "this WARP Summit is an event blessed by God because it is every religious person's wish to achieve peace through an alliance into one religion."

In February 2017, Tawhidi caused controversy when he appeared on an episode of Australian current affairs program Today Tonight. During the episode, he suggested that Islamic extremists were conspiring to set up a caliphate in Australia by buying plots of land and naming them after prominent ISIS extremists. He also made claims that these extremists planned to increase the Islamist population in Australia and rename streets after Islamic terrorists. Tawhidi called for a government body to be established in order to investigate Hizb ut-Tahrir involvement with these land development projects and activities.

In the same month, Tawhidi made a request to defend former Jakarta Governor Ahok during his blasphemy trial. He argued that the aggrieved Islamic groups had incorrectly interpreted the verse of the Quran that Ahok had allegedly referenced in a blasphemous manner. Tawhidi stated that there is nothing wrong with non-Muslims leading a Muslim-majority country. Tawhidi said he has received death threats from Indonesia's Islamic Defenders Front, which had criticized his October 2015 visit to the country after he was considered to have insulted the Sunni-majority nation by calling it "Indoneshia".

Nonetheless, Imam Tawhidi visited Indonesia again in November 2016. An Indonesian Islamic organisation Hidayatullah described Tawhidi as "an extreme Shia." Hidayatullah, established in the 1970s, is a self-described Islamic movement with no connection to Shaykh Syarif Hidayatullah (Sunan Gunungdjati), a founding figure of Islam in Indonesia.

A statement from DPP ABI, an Indonesian Shia organisation, said Tawhidi was suspected of being a "takfiri" and they rejected his presence in Indonesia. The statement went on to say that Tawhidi's presence would undermine efforts to "achieve unity of the Muslims in the face of Zionism."

In May 2017, Tawhidi appeared as a guest on Australian breakfast television program Sunrise to discuss the recent Manchester Arena bombing. He claimed many young Muslims were being pushed to believe killing infidels would allow them to gain paradise and that the Manchester bomber would have believed he would go to heaven for what he did. During the interview Tawhidi also lamented the fact that few Islamic clerics and community leaders speaks out against Islamic extremism and terrorism.

In general, Tawhidi advocates for greater civic engagement from Muslims, whom he sees as an integral part of the communities they live in.

He is also a fan of Indian actress Raveena Tandon; some of his tweets about her were compiled in a viral Twitter thread in 2019.

In 2019 he was the first Shia Imam to "pay respects" at Auschwitz concentration camp.

== Reception ==
Many Muslims find his public rhetoric divisive, claiming it alienates ordinary believers and exacerbates existing tensions between Muslim and non-Muslim communities. Tawhidi's frequent appearances in Western media, where he often harshly criticizes some mainstream Islamic practices, have led some to label him as a tool for perpetuating Islamophobia.

Tawhidi's statements and media presence have led to intense online attacks on his character and legitimacy, with groups and forums labeling him an extremist, infidel, or apostate. A 2017 report by ABC News noted that Tawhidi had very few supporters in the Muslim community.

=== Far-right groups ===
Tawhidi has been embraced by a number of Western far-right and Islamophobic groups. Tawhidi has been accused of being an ally of Australian far-right groups including the Australian Liberty Alliance as well as One Nation. Tawhidi had defended One Nation leader Pauline Hanson and supported her stances on a temporary travel ban on individuals from the Middle East during periods of intense ISIS recruitment and escalating Islamist attacks in the UK.

== Legal issues ==
On 4 November 2022, the Supreme Court of Victoria ordered Tawhidi to pay $20,000 in aggravated damages for making defamatory claims on Twitter that a man named Moustafa Awad was an "ISIS Promoter." The defamatory claims included an imputation that Awad used his position as a lawyer and migration agent to bring terrorists into the country. The incident began with Awad's social media comments, including, "I hope he spares a hero the trouble and takes his own life," and suggesting legislation should include "poisoning that c*** Tawhidi." In response, Tawhidi called on his followers to "report" Awad as an "extremist" and publicly shared Awad's contact details and business profiles.
