= Global Politician =

Online political and current events magazine

Logo for Global Politician

Global Politician was an online magazine of politics that published analysis of current events, as well as interviews with politicians, government officials, diplomats, book authors and terrorists. It was founded in October 2004 and was based in New York.

== Description ==
The magazine was founded in 2004 by David Storobin. In 2005, Storobin was credited as editor-in-chief of the Global Politician in Citizens Magazine.

Sam Vaknin served as editor-in-chief of the Global Politician.

== Interviews—partial list ==
- President of Sri Lanka Chandrika Kumaratunga.
- Finance Minister(later Prime Minister) of Macedonia Nikola Gruevski
- President of Macedonia Boris Trajkovski.
- Former President of Lebanon Amine Gemayel.
- UK Spy Glen Jenvey who Identified The People Behind London Bombings.
- Hezbollah Official Abdallah Kassir.
- UK MP Brian Binley - Iran's Nukes Won't Be Bombed.
- Iraqi General Ali Ibrahim Al-Tikriti — WMD went to Syria.
- Brazilian Former Guerilla/Terrorist and Current Congressman Fernando Gabeira.
- Fathi Abou al-Aardat, Senior Fatah Leader and Secretary of the Palestine Committee and Union in Lebanon.
- Israeli MK Benny Elon.
- Former Lebanese Foreign Minister Fares Boueiz.
- Hezbollah's political officer and director of foreign media relations Hussein Naboulsi.
- South African Freedom Front General-Secretary Colonel Piet Uys.
- Head of Lebanon's National Liberal Party Dory Chamoun.
- Interview with Lebanese Parliament Member Nayla Moawad.
- Alex Linder of the Vanguard News Network.

== Other notable contributors ==
- Michael S. Hart
- Ryan Mauro
- Glen Jenvey (as researcher)
- Faisal Kutty
