= Vaknin =

Vaknin (Hebrew: וקני) is a Jewish surname of unknown etymology originated in North Africa. Notable people with the surname include:

- Asher Vaknin, acting commissioner of the Israel Prison Service
- Hai Vaknin, an "Abergil henchman" for the Abergil crime family
- Sam Vaknin (born 1961), Israeli writer
- Sima Vaknin-Gil (born 1966), Israeli retired tat aluf (Brigadier General) of the IDF, and former head of the Ministry of Strategic Affairs
- Yitzhak Vaknin (born 1958), Israeli politician and member of the Knesset

== Fictional characters ==
- Sima Vaknin from Sima Vaknin, a Witch, 2003 Israel fantasy comedy film

== See also ==
- Vakhnin, Russian surname
