= Tashbih Sayyed =

Pakistani American journalist and author (1941–2007)

- Born: 1941; India
- Died: 2007 (aged 65–66)
- Occupations: Scholar, journalist, and author
- Writing career
- Subjects: Politics and religion
- Notable works: "History of the World," "Left of the Center," "Pakistan – An Unfinished Agenda," "Mohammad – A Secularist's View," "Foreign Policy of Pakistan" and "Shadow Warriors – Afghanistan, Pakistan, Taliban."
- Movement: Secularist

Tashbih Sayyed (1941–2007) was a Pakistani-American journalist, and author and was the editor-in-chief of Our Times, Pakistan Today, and In Review. Sayyed worked from 1967 to 1980 for the Pakistan Television Corporation. In 1981, he emigrated to the United States. As a regular columnist for newspapers in the US, Pakistan, Germany and India, Sayyed claimed that he is recognized as a direct descendant of the Prophet Muhammad and wrote from this perspective about Islamism, and what he perceived as the Islamist threat to the US, Israel and the West. In 2004 he was one of the founders of the Center for Islamic Pluralism.

He was also founder of the websites Muslim World Today and Pakistan Today (not the Pakistani newspaper of the same name). Sayyed is featured in the documentaries, Relentless: The Struggle for Peace in Israel and Obsession: Radical Islam's War Against the West.

== Life and career ==
Tashbih Sayyed was born in India in 1941 to a Shiite Muslim family. Following the partition of India and the creation of Pakistan in 1947, his family left for Pakistan.

He started his career in journalism at Pakistan Television in 1967, ultimately becoming the controller and general manager of the station. During his last years at Pakistan Television, Sayyed became the founder of the station's current affairs programming. As a result of his liberal views, however, he came under attack by the Zia ul-Haq regime. He left his position at the station in 1980 and immigrated to the U.S. in 1981.

After moving to the United States, he worked as a translator and writer for several years.

In later years, Sayyed founded two California-based weekly newspapers, Pakistan Today (1991) and Muslim World Today. He is the author of eight books, including History of the World, Left of the Center, Pakistan – An Unfinished Agenda, Mohammad – A Secularist's View, Foreign Policy of Pakistan and Shadow Warriors – Afghanistan, Pakistan, Taliban. He appeared in the documentary Relentless: The Struggle for Peace in Israel (2003) and in Obsession: Radical Islam's War Against the West (2005).

He was the founder and president of the Council for Democracy and Tolerance in the United States, an organization established to promote pluralism and respect for democratic values in society. He also served as editor of South Asia in Review, a quarterly journal, and was an adjunct fellow of the Hudson Institute in Washington, D.C.. He was a speaker for Benador Associates.

== Death ==
After Sayeed's death in 2007, his daughter Supna succeeded him as editor-in-chief of Muslim World Today and Pakistan Today.

== Views on the Islamist movement ==
Sayyed criticized Palestinian extremism, saying that "Terrorists not only benefit from wide support through Palestinian society, they embody only too well the deepest hopes of the majority: to destroy the Jewish state". He criticized Arab nations of making the children and grandchildren of Palestinian refugees second-class citizens in Lebanon, Syria, or the Gulf States, and said that the refugees "cling to the illusion that defeating the Jews will restore their dignity".

He said that Arab dictators, the PLO and radical Islamist movements have used the media, mosques and universities to present Jews as unholy intruders, occupiers, murderers, and enemies of Islam. "To create a Palestinian state before this mindset is changed can only ensure that the new state will be yet another terrorist sponsor.", he argued. He continued by saying that Palestinian "terrorist movements" have successfully connected the Arab-Israeli conflict with the militant Islamists' goal of establishing a global caliphate.

== Views on Israel ==
Sayyed regarded Israel highly, and said that Israel is vital for the stability of the region. In an article published in Muslim World Today, describing his visit to Israel, has said that Arabs are protected by Israel's democratic principles, the Muslim Arab citizens of Israel are afforded all the rights and privileges of Israeli citizenship. He noted that Israel is one of the few countries in the Middle East where Arab women can vote. In contrast to the non-Israeli Arab world, Arab women in Israel enjoy the same status as men. Muslim women have the right to vote and to be elected to public office. Muslim women, according to Sayyed, are in fact more liberated in Israel than in any Muslim country. Israeli law prohibits polygamy, child marriage, and the "barbarity" of female sexual mutilation. He concluded by saying "I am convinced that it is true that God created this earth but it is also a fact that only an Israel can keep this earth from dying".

He condemned the press that portrays the Israelis as villains, and "chooses to ignore all rules of ethical journalism when it comes to Israel".

Sayyed was strongly affiliated with Zionism and openly promoted himself as a Muslim Zionist. His close friend was the eminent Israeli journalist Ari Busse. Busse's strong pro-Zionist views were reflected in Sayyed's writings. Busse now runs Muslim World Today and Paktoday.com.

== See also ==
- Wafa Sultan
- Muslim supporters of Israel

== Bibliography ==
- History of the World
- Left of the Center
- Pakistan – An Unfinished Agenda
- Mohammad – A secularist's View
- Foreign Policy of Pakistan
- Shadow Warriors – Afghanistan, Pakistan, Taliban
- "Stop Ahmadinejad Before It's Too Late", Global Politician, 5 November 2007
