= Zuhdi Jasser =

American doctor, Muslim activist, and commentator (born 1967)

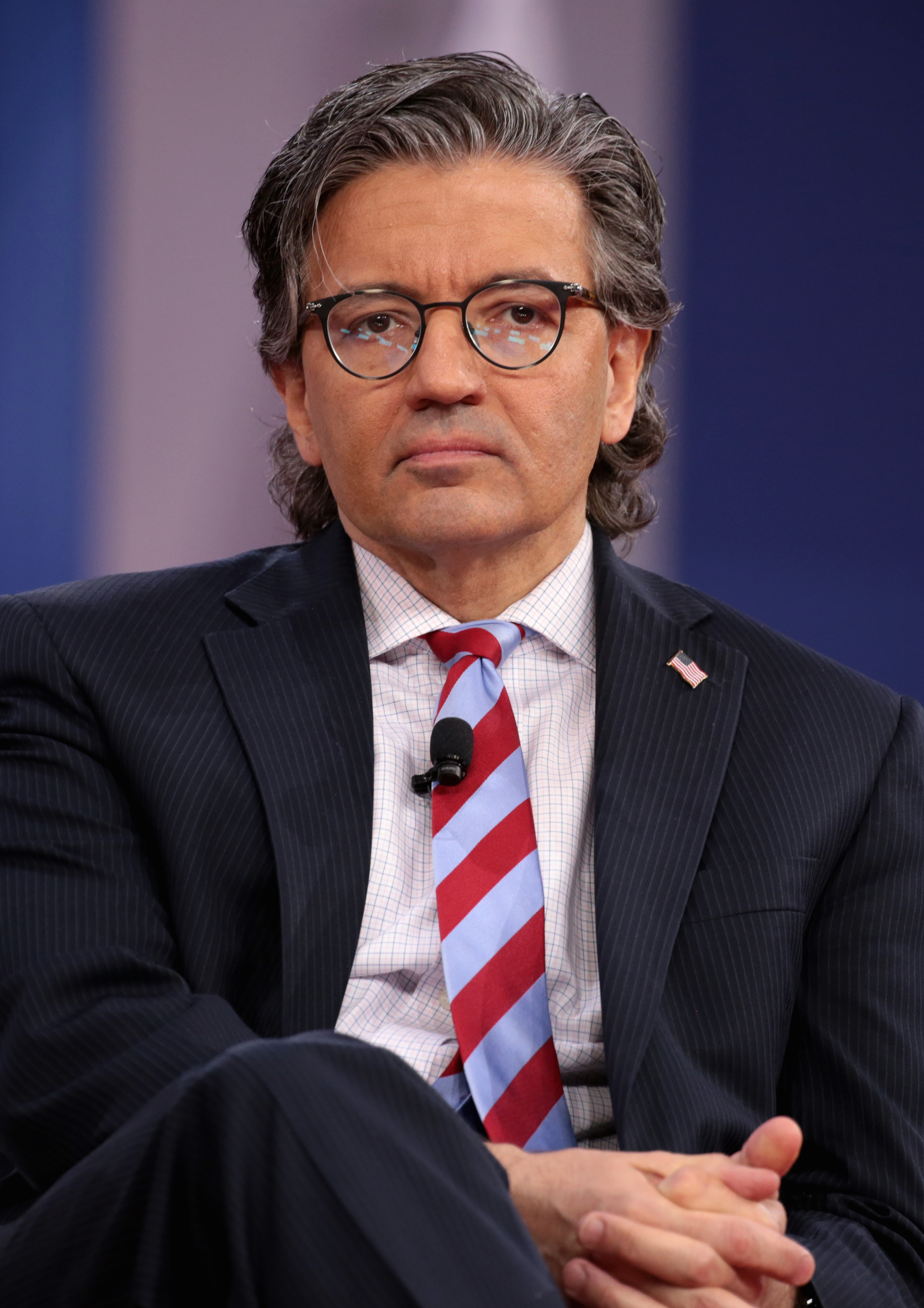
- Jasser at the Conservative Political Action Conference, 2018
- Born: Mohamed Zuhdi Jasser; November 17, 1967 (age 58); Canton, Ohio, U.S.
- Education: University of Wisconsin, Milwaukee (BS); Medical College of Wisconsin (MD)
- Political party: Republican
- Children: 3
- Awards: Meritorious Service Medal

Mohamed Zuhdi Jasser (born November 17, 1967) is an American religious and political commentator and a medical doctor specializing in internal medicine and nuclear cardiology in Phoenix, Arizona. Jasser is a former Lieutenant Commander in the United States Navy, where he served as staff internist in the Office of the Attending Physician of the United States Congress. In 2003, with a group of American Muslims, Jasser founded the American Islamic Forum for Democracy (AIFD) based in Phoenix, Arizona, and in 2004 he was one of the founders of the Center for Islamic Pluralism.

In March 2012, Senate Minority Leader Mitch McConnell (R-KY) appointed Jasser to serve a two-year term on the U.S. Commission on International Religious Freedom.

== Biography ==
Born on November 17, 1967, in Canton, Ohio, Jasser is the son of Syrians who immigrated to the United States in the 1960s, owing to repression in their homeland. His grandfather, Zuhdi Jasser, who owned a vegetable oil company in Syria was a devout Muslim with an admiration of the West. His father, Mohamed Kais Jasser, is a cardiologist who studied medicine at the University of London and Syria in the early 1960s, he was an active critic through his newspaper columns, which led to his migration with his pharmacist wife in 1963 from Beirut, Lebanon to the United States. Jasser was raised in Appleton, Wisconsin, until the age of 6. The family then moved to Neenah, Wisconsin, where he was raised in the Sunni branch of Islam.

He attended the University of Wisconsin–Milwaukee, earning his bachelor of science in 1988; then he attended the Medical College of Wisconsin on a U.S. Navy scholarship, receiving his M.D. in 1992. He served in the Navy for 11 years, receiving the Meritorious Service Medal and attaining the rank of Lieutenant Commander by the time of his honorable discharge in 1999. His tours of duty included staff internist for the U.S. Congress, medical department head aboard the USS El Paso, and chief resident at Bethesda Naval Hospital. He moved to Arizona after his discharge from the Navy, taking over part of his father's medical practice.

Jasser frequently writes and talks about the issue of political Islam. James Woolsey former head of the CIA and Seth Liebsohn, author and radio show host describe him as "the kind of man our government should listen to". Jasser utilizes his commentating, speaking engagements, and media appearances "to press Muslim leaders to aggressively oppose a 'culture of separatism'".

On March 10, 2011, Jasser appeared as a witness at the first in a series of hearings conducted by the United States House Committee on Homeland Security on "The Extent of Radicalization in the American Muslim Community and the Community's Response". Jasser's testimony focused on how the polarization of American views of the Muslim community are an obstacle to reform within the faith. During his testimony he said that American Muslim organizations had been "circling the wagons" and have too frequently cautioned Muslims against speaking to law enforcement without a lawyer present. He also said that political Islam was based on the idea that the government should be run under Islamic law, which he said violated the American concept of separation of church and state.

On June 24, 2011, Jasser appeared before the House Judiciary Subcommittee on the Constitution to testify in favor of H.R. 963, the "See Something, Say Something" Act.

Jasser's medical practice is in Phoenix, Arizona and he resides in Scottsdale, Arizona, with his wife and three children, who are being raised as Muslims.

In 2024, Jasser ran for U.S. Representative in Congress as a Republican in Arizona's 4th congressional district, losing to Kelly Cooper in the GOP primary.

== Views on Islam ==
Jasser describes himself as a devout Muslim who believes that "America in fact provides the best atmosphere for Muslims to practice our faith". He does not claim to be a formal expert in Quranic Arabic, or in sharia (Islamic jurisprudence), but he "see[s] Islam (consistent with 'Ijtihad', the tradition of critical interpretation of Islamic scripture) as applicable in the modern world and subject to logic and reason".

Jasser began criticizing American Muslim organizations including the Council on American-Islamic Relations (CAIR), the Islamic Society of North America, the North American Imams Federation, the Assembly of Muslim Jurists of America, Muslim Students' Association, the Muslim Public Affairs Council, the Muslim American Society, the Islamic Circle of North America, and the Center for the Study of Islam and Democracy, because he sees them as Islamist, meaning they support a mixing of Islam and politics. He has been especially critical of CAIR, a Muslim American civil rights group that, according to Jasser, is focused on "victimology" and does not adequately condemn the goals of the terrorist groups. A CAIR official has responded, "[W]ith these people, nothing we would do would satisfy them" and going so far as to claim that Zuhdi is "a mere sock puppet for Islam haters".

Jasser has also engaged in interfaith activities, serving on the board of the Arizona Interfaith Movement; helping to found an Arizona-based organization called The Children of Abraham, a Jewish-Muslim dialogue group in 2000, and a chapter of Seeds of Peace in 2003.

Jasser has said that he and his family have helped build a number of small mosques in different cities using locally raised funds, and at times encountering, but always overcoming local opposition.

Jasser believes acts of Islamic terrorism are rooted in the ideology of political Islam or Islamism. He has expressed the opinion that the 2009 Christmas Day attempted airplane bombing, the 2009 Fort Hood shooting, and the 2010 Times Square car bombing attempt have not prodded the United States into the appropriate action, but rather have resulted in politically correct denial by U.S. government authorities, and inaction by most American Muslims. He believes that even the Bush administration took inadequate measures against Islamism in America. He says the U.S. needs to provide alternatives for Muslim youth and promote reformist groups. In his television appearances, Jasser has claimed that 3 to 5 percent of U.S. Muslims are militant and 30 to 40 percent do not believe in separation of mosque and state. He also states that he believes many Western Muslim imams are too timid in their response to Islamic State of Iraq and the Levant seemingly both criticizing but also sympathizing with its goal of a caliphate stating "Clearly, the majority of the mosques in the United States are led by imams who are Islamists – who believe that in Muslim-majority countries that the state should be identified as an Islamic state."

Testifying at Rep. Peter King's controversial homegrown Islamic terrorism hearings in 2011, Jasser has stated that Muslims are "long overdue for an ideological counter-jihad," claiming that Muslim American leaders, including imams, are contributing to radicalization. He has been described as a part of the counter-jihad movement, having supported Frank Gaffney's work, although he has fallen out with some other members of the movement, whom he has labeled "alt-jihadists".

== Views on Israel ==
Jasser is an outspoken supporter of Israel and believes that Muslim organizations and leaders need to be held to a litmus test to see whether they recognize Israel as a state.

== American Islamic Forum for Democracy ==
Jasser and a group of American Muslims founded the nonprofit American Islamic Forum for Democracy (AIFD) in 2003 with the goal of demonstrating the compatibility of Islam with democracy and American values. Jasser is the group's president and chief spokesman. The AIFD supports separation of religion and state, religious pluralism, equality of the sexes, the unconditional recognition of Israel, and the creation of an independent Palestine "on the current 'occupied territories.'" The organization rejects terrorism and any justification for it.

== Documentaries ==
Jasser has contributed to four documentaries. He appeared in the PBS film Islam v Islamists: Voices from the Muslim Center, which PBS suppressed after pressure from Muslim organizations.

He was the main narrator in the Clarion Fund film, The Third Jihad, which opens with Jasser stating, "This is not a film about Islam. It is about the threat of radical Islam. Only a small percentage of the world's 1.3 billion Muslims are radical. This film is about them." Third Jihad's promotional materials state that "radical Islamists driven by a religiously motivated rejection of western values cultures and religion are engaging in a multifaceted strategy to overcome the western world". The film stirred controversy, with the New Republic stating the producer of the film has ties to the Israeli settlement movement. Although Jasser has said he does not agree with everything in the film, he supports the overall message.

Jasser also appeared in the 2010 Newt Gingrich film, America At Risk: The War With No Name, a production of Citizens United. The film's promotional materials state that "we are long overdue for a serious global strategy in fighting terrorism and the ideology behind it. We must have the courage to tell the truth and to act on that truth." It has been described as "anti-Obama" by The Nation.

Jasser also appeared in the Fox News documentary Fox Reporting: A Question of Honor, which examines the killing of Noor Al-Maleki in Peoria, Arizona, by her father, Falah Al-Maleki, and his subsequent trial.

== Controversies ==
According to The Washington Post, "In some ways, Zuhdi Jasser doesn't match the profile of the typical Muslim American. He's an active Republican who has supported the U.S. wars in Afghanistan and Iraq, is an advocate for Israel and says his faith harbors 'an insidious supremacism.'"

According to the progressive magazine Mother Jones, "Jasser has lately become the right's go-to guy when it comes to providing cover for policies or positions that many Muslim Americans contend are discriminatory. When controversy over the so-called Ground Zero mosque erupted, Jasser, a frequent guest on Fox News, accused the builders of trying to 'diminish what happened' on September 11, 2001. He has supported statewide bans on Shariah law in American courts and has helped bolster conservative warnings that American Muslims seek to replace the Constitution with a harsh interpretation of Islamic law. Many American Muslim groups, meanwhile, view Jasser as a reliable apologist for Republicans and anti-Muslim figures—one with little grassroots support in the American Muslim community."

Jasser has frequently been in conflict with a number of Muslim advocacy organizations, such as the Council on American-Islamic Relations, Islamic Society of North America, Muslim Public Affairs Council, and Islamic Circle of North America, claiming that they are Islamist, are focused on "victimology" and do not adequately condemn the goals of terrorist groups. These organizations in turn protested his March 2012 appointment to the U.S. Commission on International Religious Freedom. The editorial board of The Arizona Republic responded to these protests by describing them as "ad hominem attacks that are made up out of whole cloth, falsely accusing him and Muslim members of his American Islamic Forum for Democracy of being non-practicing Muslims, at best, and Islam-haters at worst". The Republic editorial board further stated that "[Jasser's] presence there affirms exactly what his strident opponents fear most—that there indeed is a diversity of voices, of points of view, among Muslims."

An article in the media watchdog group Media Matters for America criticized Jasser's alleged lack of credentials and his "right-wing rhetoric".

== Professional activities, honors, and awards ==
Jasser practices internal medicine and nuclear cardiology in Phoenix. He has been on the Maricopa County board of health since 2005. He is a member of the Clarion Fund's advisory board, a New York–based nonprofit organization that produces and distributes documentaries on the threats of Radical Islam. In 2011 the group released the film Iranium that explores the Iranian nuclear program as it pertains to threats against the West, and Islamic fundamentalism in Iran.

In 2007 he formed a statewide Disaster Preparedness Task Force for physicians. He chairs a bioethics committee and teaches nuclear cardiology in Phoenix.

He was honored in October 2007 by Center for Security Policy as a "Defender of the Home Front" for his anti-Islamist activism. In January 2008 he was presented with the 2007 Director's Community Leadership Award by the Phoenix office of the Federal Bureau of Investigation.

== See also ==
- Asra Nomani
- Tarek Fatah
- Qanta A. Ahmed
- Raheel Raza
