= Carl Gibeily =

Lebanese journalist

Carl Gibeily (IPA /ka:l ʤɪbeɪli/) (b. 1966 Lebanon) is a Lebanese author and journalist who has worked for The Daily Star and The Gulf Online.

Gibeily's books and articles discuss the relationship between East and West, and examines the political, social and psychological issues in the Middle East.

Gibeily has written three novels: Pairing the Twain, Blueprint for a Prophet, and Greater than a Wall .

== Early life ==
Born in Lebanon in 1966, Gibeily studied in Beirut. After the outbreak of the Lebanese Civil War, he family moved to the United Kingdom. Gibeily attended the Oratory School, before reading engineering at Cambridge University where he was awarded an MA.

As of 2017, Gibeily was residing in Edinburgh, Scotland, with his wife and two children.

== Later life ==
Gibeily once worked as a chocolate salesman in Dubai. He then worked as a journalist for The Daily Star in Lebanon and as an editor for the United Nations.

Gibeily is now involved in publishing art books.

== Books ==
=== Blueprint for a Prophet ===
Mainly set in Lebanon during the Lebanese Civil War, Blueprint for a Prophet focuses on the fear caused by religious conservatism. It follows Samir Khoury, a young Greek child who ruminates over numismatics and Hellenistic tetadrachms. The story also interweaves a so-called Chosen One', Khaled, who grows up from an unloved child into a terrorist vizier.

Jacqueline Jondot, Professor at the University of Toulouse, called the book 'Les jeux de l'amour et de la mort', 'the joys of love and of death".

=== Greater than a Wall ===
Greater than a Wall is about two families:

- the Israeli Lunzers, comprising Aron and his son Avi
- the Zeitunis, Palestinian olive agriculturalists whose olive farm is ruined by an Israeli wall.

Avi, extorted by his father to complete his conscribed military service, is caught in a suspicious incident of a suicide-bombing attack by the gate at Qalqilya. Aron investigates the incident of a fallen Israeli soldier . His endeavours provide a route to encountering Lebanese Francophile Bernadette. Aron and Bernadette uncover the truth of the purported attack upon the IDF base.

=== Pairing the Twain ===
Pairing the Twain is a science fiction novel. When an experiment concerning gravity and egocentric spin go disastrously askew, the scientist George is projected into an alternative plane of existence, transported in mind into a reptilian body.

George discovers his androgynous status as 'he' and 'she' among a bipedal society of undifferentiated civilians. Accosted by Khab, Chief Scientist, he discovers that he is the sole individual responsible for Earth's looming fate.

== Chronon theory of time ==
The published novels Blueprint for a Prophet and Pairing the Twain feature a salient theory of time entitled Chronon theory of time (CTT). The CTT should not be confused with the chronon theory, positing a non-continuous progression of time, or the chronon, the necessary time taken for one photon of light to traverse the classical radius of the electron. The CTT evaluates the passage of time as the flow of quantum-time particles through the fabric of matter, thereby displacing the matter in time. The CTT is in accord to the A-theory of time devised by McTaggart, whereby time is esteemed asymmetric and possessing clear tense and an arrow of time.

Within Blueprint for a Prophet, the astrophysicist Maira analogizes the progression of time to three entities of differing magnitude who stroll a coastline: an ant, a man and a giant. These entities, as theorized in Blueprint for a Prophet, will (a) devise a meter corresponding to its magnitude and therefore (b) perceive the fractal distance differently in proportion to the size. Analogously, the passage of time is relative to the agent and his mass, density and volume.

Integrally to the principal publication, time is reported by the author to dilate, proportionate to the expansion factor of the universe. Consequently, telecommunications received from ancient civilizations are postulated to cover a briefer time-frame than the modern relative second.
