= Salim Mansur =

Indian-Canadian professor of political science

- Born: Kolkata, India
- Occupations: Professor, writer

Salim Mansur is a professor emeritus of political science at the University of Western Ontario in Canada. He is a former columnist for the London Free Press and the Toronto Sun, and has contributed to various publications including National Review, the Middle East Forum and Frontpagemag. He often presents analysis on the Muslim world, Islam, South Asia, Middle East. He is also a member of the Freedom Party of Ontario.

Mansur was a candidate for the People's Party of Canada for the 2019 federal election.

== Biography ==
Mansur was born in Kolkata, India, and moved to Toronto, Ontario, Canada where he completed his doctorate studies in political science.

Mansur is a member of the board of directors for the Center for Islamic Pluralism based in Washington, D.C., a Senior Fellow with the Canadian Coalition for Democracies, a group which seeks to support democracies and placed particular emphasis on calling for the Government of Canada to adopt a pro-Israel stance.

Salim Mansur was one of the founding members of Canadians Against Suicide Bombing, a group that has lobbied to amend Canada's Criminal Code to cite suicide bombing as a terrorist crime, efforts which resulted in the passing of Bill S-215 in December 2010.

He is an academic-consultant with the Center for Security Policy in Washington, D.C. He has been a consultant with CIDA on development issues and has published widely in academic journals on foreign policy matters and area studies of the Middle East and South Asia.

He is featured on the documentary Obsession: Radical Islam's War Against the West produced by the David Horowitz Freedom Center. He also unsuccessfully ran for the Canadian Alliance party in 2000, being defeated by Sue Barnes.

Mansur said he was ostracized after writing columns condemning the Taliban and comparing it to the Khmer Rouge of Cambodia. According to Mansur, the severe backlash has prompted him to stop going to his local mosque.

David B. Harris claims there have been two fatwas issued by unspecified individuals against Mansur, calling for his death.

At a press conference on 2 October 2008, Mansur stated that: "Islam is my private life, my conscience... [but] my faith does not take precedence over my duties... to Canada and its constitution, which I embrace freely... I am first and most importantly a Canadian... Only in a free society will you find Islam as a faith and not a political religion." Mansur expressed the view that former New Democratic Party Leader Jack Layton had: "gone to bed with Islamists".

Mansur was a candidate for the People's Party of Canada for the 2019 Federal election. Mansur wrote in an Op-ed to Waterloo Region Record, that he wrote the PPC immigration policy. He previously held the Conservative nomination in London North Centre but was disqualified by the party leadership.

== Notable viewpoints ==
=== Views on Israel-Palestine conflict ===
In 2008, Mansur congratulated Israel for its 60th anniversary, and declared that the Jewish state "deserves admiration": "Israel is a tiny sliver of land in a vast tempest-ridden sea of the Arab-Muslim world, and yet it is here the ancient world's most enduring story is made fresh again by Jews to live God's covenant with Abraham as told in their sacred literature." In 2010, he wrote: "The story of modern Israel, as many have noted, is a miracle unlike any [...] It is a robust and inclusive democracy, and is at the leading edge of science and technology [...] What hypocrites demand of Israelis and the scrutiny Israel is subjected to by them, they would not dare make of any other nation."

Mansur wrote that a Palestinian state was de facto created by Britain in Jordan by partitioning its Palestine Mandate in 1922, and the Palestinians would have had a state of their own, had they accepted Israel and reconciled themselves to the rights of the Jews in Jerusalem and the Holy Land.

=== Criticism of the Arab and Muslim world ===
Mansur writes that, from Algeria to Indonesia, from Central Asian republics to Sudan, the entire Muslim world: "has turned its back on modernity". He says the Muslim world must stop blaming the West for its own ailments.

Mansur's criticisms of other parts of the world have extended so far that he has testified on 1 October 2012 to the House of Commons Standing Committee on Citizenship and Immigration that Canada should stop immigration from Muslim countries. Mansur stated:

The flow of immigration into Canada from around the world, and in particular the flow from Muslim countries, means a pouring in of numbers into a liberal society of people from cultures at best non-liberal. But we know through our studies and observations that the illiberal mix of cultures poses one of the greatest dilemmas and an unprecedented challenge to liberal societies, such as ours, when there is no demand placed on immigrants any longer to assimilate into the founding liberal values of the country to which they have immigrated to and, instead, by a misguided and thoroughly wrong-headed policy of multiculturalism encourage the opposite.

Based on his association with the People's Party and his candidacy in the 43rd Canadian Federal Election, coupled with his anti-Muslim views, Mansur was denied a spot at an all-candidates debate being held on October 6, 2019, at the London Muslim Mosque. He has indicated that he may pursue legal action, as he was the only candidate who was not invited.

=== Skepticism about mainstream scientific position on climate change ===
Mansur said in 2009 that Climategate revelations "falsified" a theory associated with the claim of man-made global warming. He has also suggested that climate scientists, "corrupted by the lure of money and influence, subscribed to the UN-based scheme for the largest global tax grab and revenue transfer – some version of global carbon tax – by raising false alarms about impending planetary doom in the name of science."

== Electoral record ==
2019 Canadian federal election: London North Centre
Party	Candidate	Votes	%	±%	Expenditures
Liberal	Peter Fragiskatos	27,427	42.75	−7.71	$107,501.27
Conservative	Sarah Bokhari	15,066	23.64	−7.47	none listed
New Democratic	Dirka Prout	14,887	23.36	+8.69	none listed
Green	Carol Dyck	4,872	7.64	+4.09	$12,325.20
People's	Salim Mansur	1,532	2.40	—	$61,391.07
Communist	Clara Sorrenti	137	0.21	—	none listed
Total valid votes/expense limit		63,741	99.23		
Total rejected ballots		493	0.77	+0.35	
Turnout		64,234	65.52	−3.91	
Eligible voters		98,039			
Liberal hold		Swing		−0.12	
Source: Elections Canada

== Books ==
- 1994: (with N.K. Choudhry) (eds). The Indira-Rajiv Years: The Indian Economy and Polity 1966–1991. Toronto: Centre for South Asian Studies, University of Toronto.
- 2009: Islam’s Predicament: Perspectives of a Dissident Muslim. Oakville, Canada and Niagara Falls, NY: Mosaic Press.
- 2011: Delectable Lie: a liberal repudiation of multiculturalism. Brantford, ON: Mantua Books.
