= Sam Vaknin =

Israeli author (born 1961)

- סם ואקנין
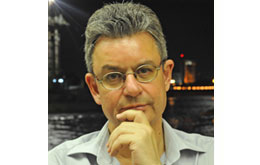
- Vaknin in 2014
- Born: Shmuel Vaknin; April 21, 1961 (age 65); Kiryat Yam, Israel
- Occupation: Writer
- Known for: Self-help material on psychology and personality disorders, in particular NPD. Work on chronons.
- Spouse: Lidija Rangelovska
- Website: narcissistic-abuse.com

Shmuel "Sam" Vaknin (Hebrew: שמואל "סם" ואקנין, born April 21, 1961) is an Israeli writer. He is the author of Malignant Self Love: Narcissism Revisited (1999), was the last editor-in-chief of the now-defunct political news website Global Politician, and runs a private website about narcissistic personality disorder (NPD).

== Life ==
Born in Kiryat Yam, Israel, Vaknin was the eldest of five children born to Sephardi Jewish immigrants. His mother was from Turkey, and his father, a construction worker, was from Morocco. He describes a difficult, violent childhood, stating in an interview that his parents "were ill-equipped to deal with normal children, let alone the gifted". Vaknin believes that abuse and trauma from this time triggered his NPD. Vaknin was conscripted into the Israel Defense Forces when he was 17.

From1982 to 1983, Vaknin studied for a doctorate at Pacific Western University (California)(a non-profit university offering distance education and now known as California Miramar University). His PhD dissertation was entitled "Time Asymmetry Revisited". In it, Vaknin postulated the existence of a particle (chronon). Vaknin's work has been expanded into the Geometric Chronon Field Theory by independent researcher Eytan H. Suchard.

By the mid 1980s, Vaknin was living in London, and was successful financially, but aware of difficulties in his relationship with his first wife, including severe mood swings. He sought help from a psychiatrist, who diagnosed him with narcissistic personality disorder (NPD). Vaknin did not accept the diagnosis. As he later reflected: "I had no idea what he was talking about," he says. "I tried to corrupt him, I offered him money, and having felt that I succeeded, I lost all interest in him."

Vaknin moved back to Israel, where he became director of the investment firm, Mikbatz Teshua. In 1995, Vaknin and two other men were convicted of three counts of securities fraud for deceiving customers and thereafter engaging in stock manipulation. He was sentenced to 18 months' imprisonment and fined 50,000 shekels (about $14,000), and the company was fined 100,000 shekels. As a condition of parole, he agreed to another mental health evaluation, which noted various personality disorders. According to Vaknin, "I was borderline, schizoid, but the most dominant was NPD." On this occasion he accepted the diagnosis, because, he wrote, "it was a relief to know what I had." As he reflected on the failure of his marriage, his estrangement from his family, his financial difficulties, and the ruin of his reputation, he initially blamed others for his difficulties but with time he realized that he was at fault. While in prison, he began to write his book "Malignant Self Love – Narcissism Revisited".

After serving 11 months, Vaknin was released in 1996, and moved to Skopje, Republic of Macedonia, now North Macedonia. He began to educate and engage with thousands of narcissists and their victims in internet discussion forums, videos, ebooks and his own website. In September 2025, his YouTube channel had 419,000 subscribers. His views have been solicited by the media. He is credited with greatly raising public awareness of NPD.

He met Macedonian Lidija Rangelovska, and together they set up Narcissus Publications in 1997, which publishes Vaknin's work. His book, Malignant Self Love – Narcissism Revisited was published by the press in 1999. After five years together, the couple married.

Vaknin has appeared in many documentary films about narcissism and NPD. In 2007, he appeared in the episode "Egomania" of the British Channel 4 documentary series Mania. In 2009, he was the subject of the Australian documentary, I, Psychopath, directed by Ian Walker. In the film, Vaknin underwent a psychological evaluation in which he met the criteria for psychopathy according to the Hare Psychopathy Checklist. He is filmed bullying and seeking to manipulate Walker, while showing detailed insight into both his actions and its negative emotional impact on the director. Furthermore, in 2013, he was interviewed in "Moi, narcissique et cruel" produced by RTS in Switzerland, and in 2016, he appeared in the documentary How Narcissists Took Over the World produced by Vice Media.

From 1998 to 2001, Vaknin wrote for the Central Europe Review about Balkans-related issues. Between 2001 and 2003, he was a senior business correspondent for United Press International. He has also written for the Middle East Times. From 1999 to 2001, Vaknin was the general manager of Capital Markets Institute, a company that advised Russian and Macedonian governments. He served as an advisor and mentor to Macedonian Minister of Finance and later prime minister, Nikola Gruevski. They co-authored the book "Macedonian Economy on a Crossroads". Vaknin has written regularly for other publications, including from 2006 to 2013 for the online American Chronicle.

Vaknin taught at Southern Federal University in Rostov Oblast, Russia between 2017 and 2022, giving three lectures there on personality theory in psychology. In 2024, he was appointed a visiting professor to the South East European University in Tetovo, North Macedonia. He also teaches courses in business studies and psychology at the Commonwealth Institute for Advanced Professional Studies (CIAPS).

== Views on narcissism ==
Vaknin has shared extensively about NPD and his own experience of the condition. He describes two types of narcissism: a healthy narcissism which is the basis for self-esteem, self-worth and awareness of limitations and boundaries, and malignant narcissism, which is the consequence of abuse. This narcissistic style may develop into a narcissistic personality disorder.

Vaknin views NPD as a complex post-traumatic stress condition: a child has reacted to trauma with narcissism, and has failed to mature since then, leading to an addictive personality and a dysfunctional attachment style, in which the child "withdraw[s] inwards, to seek gratification from a secure, reliable and permanently available source: from one’s self". Among the causes of trauma Vaknin describes is childhood spoiling and pampering, as the child may internalize the faulty message that they will always get what they desire. In addition, he states that narcissists tend to have narcissistic parents.

In Vaknin's view, narcissism is a defence mechanism designed to deflect trauma, hurt and their own perceived deficiencies. Those with NPD have lost their "true self", the core of their personality, which has been replaced by delusions of grandeur, a "false self", which is incapable of loving or empathizing. He states that this empty world requires praise and attention of others to fill their need for unconditional love. Unlike a typical individual who welcomes a moderate amount of external admiration and approval, but avoids excessive amounts, a person with NPD is insatiable in their desire for attention, also known as narcissistic supply. Vaknin suggests that there are two types of narcissistic supply: primary supply is received from casual friends, acquaintances, strangers and coworkers amongst others, while secondary supply is derived from the narcissist's need to be viewed as successful. It is in part provided by parents, partners, and children, who by their existence, appearance and qualities, contribute to the narcissist's self-image. Vaknin states that children are "the ultimate source of narcissistic supply". In his view, offspring are instrumentalized to be the fulfillment of the dreams of their narcissistic parent(s), are taught to subjugate their independence to feed the supply needs of the patent(s), and may be traumatized by the difficulties of living up to parental expectations.

Vaknin states that if positive attention is not available, the narcissist prefers to inspire negative emotions in others rather than be ignored. As narcissists cannot empathize with others, they are not aware of the consequences of their actions. Vaknin reports that they can only experience what he calls “cold empathy”, in which the narcissist identifies emotions in others by observing their behaviour and feeling that they should care, but are unable to experience it. In Vaknin's view, narcissists have a limited range of emotions, typically only negative feelings such as anger, jealousy and hate. The pain and anguish they feel leads them to create an identity around being a victim or survivor which justifies their relentless self-focus and exploitative relationships. Narcissists cannot love or experience joy: instead they may feel elated, which he describes as a parasitic "form of merging with another person, fusing with them.”

Vaknin distinguishes between cerebral and somatic narcissists. Cerebral narcissists ostentatiously display their intellectual abilities and wit in order to gain the admiration of others; in contrast, somatic narcissists focus on seeking attention for their outward appearance, including their looks, possessions, and sexual prowess. Vaknin considers himself a cerebral narcissist. Moreover, he calls narcissistic co-dependents "inverted narcissists" who actively seek out relationships with narcissists despite negative past experiences, embracing the role of victim in an effort to control their abuser. "[They] provide the narcissist with an obsequious, unthreatening audience ... the perfect backdrop."

According to Vaknin, people with NPD, though fundamentally envious and lacking in confidence, are adept at manipulating and charming and persuading others. Vaknin believes that disproportionate numbers of pathological narcissists are at work in the professions where they can exert control and receive adulation such as medicine, finance, politics and show-business. He views the internet as a magnet for narcissists, "[as it] allows us to replicate ourselves and our words, to play-act our favourite roles, to communicate instantly with thousands, to influence others and, in general, to realize some of our narcissistic dreams and tendencies." In 2019, Vaknin appeared in an online documentary on the subject: "Plugged-in: The True Toxicity of Social Media Revealed".

Vaknin views NPD as incurable, and with a poor prognosis. In his view, "the vast majority of narcissists end up at the very top or the very bottom – derelict, desolate, schizoid, bitter, decaying and decrepit. You won’t find any in the middle." He states that treatment approaches tend to focus on the narcissist's victims rather than helping the narcissist: this is the result of therapists viewing the disorder as untreatable and the behavior of the narcissist as very difficult to modify.

Vaknin believes that narcissists may be the most qualified to treat the disorder. He argues that in NPD, healing comes not from empathy and compassion, but from severe narcissistic injury. Vaknin developed a treatment modality for narcissism and depression, dubbed "Cold Therapy". As a result of its origin in childhood trauma, typical adult therapies are not appropriate. Cold Therapy is based on recasting pathological narcissism as a form of CPTSD (complex post-traumatic stress disorder) and arrested development. Vaknin reports that early results of the approach are encouraging.

== Selected publications ==
- Requesting my Loved One (Bakasha me-Isha Ahuva) published by Yedioth Aharonot Miskal, Tel-Aviv, 1997
- (with Nikola Gruevski) Macedonian Economy on a Crossroads. Skopje, NIP Noval Literatura, 1998. ISBN 9989-610-01-0
- Malignant Self Love: Narcissism Revisited. Narcissus Publications, Prague, 1999. ISBN 978-80-238-3384-3
- After the Rain: How the West Lost the East. Narcissus Publications, in association with Central Europe Review/CEENMI, 2000. ISBN 80-238-5173-X
