= Revolutionary Workers Ferment =

Spanish Communist international

The Revolutionary Workers Ferment, often known by its Spanish name or initials Fomento Obrero Revolucionario or FOR, was a small Trotskyist international founded by Grandizo Munis, which arose as a split from the Fourth International at its Second Congress in 1948.

Though Munis and his co-thinkers carried on polemics with other currents of Trotskyst origin for three decades, and it was only in the late 1970s that a formal organization was formed. The FOR only held one international conference, at Paris in 1981. At that conference a split emerged between, on the one hand the "interior" Spanish section based in Spain, supported by the FOCUS group in the United States, and the Spanish "exile" faction based in Paris, along with the French section. The interior Spanish and American groups were expelled from the FOR.

Munis and the FOR had developed an "ultraleft" policy: they were opposed to the "Communist" states, regarding them as state capitalist; they were opposed to the capitalist system and its form of government; they did not believe in parliamentarism, political parties or trade unions; they did not believe in any kind of nationalism or national liberation struggles and affirmed the "inevitable necessity of the communist revolution on a world scale".

== Sections ==
Groups associated with the FOR included

- FOR Organizing Committee of the United States in the United States
- The Allarme Group in Italy
- Synagermos in Greece
- Allerma in Spain
- Alarme in France
