= David B. Harris =

Canadian lawyer and commentator

David B. Harris is a Canadian lawyer and former contractor with the Canadian Security Intelligence Service where he was a senior manager between 1988 and 1990. Since 2015, he has been director of the international intelligence program at Insignis Strategic Research and a frequent media commentator on issues related to terrorism. He is a former Senior Fellow for Terrorism and National Security at the now-defunct Canadian Coalition for Democracies.

Notably, Harris has suggested that Canada's immigration policy encourages the use of Canada as a base for terrorists and he has consistently advocated for harsher Canadian laws to combat terrorism. He is an outspoken defender of the Canadian government's use of security certificates to detain terrorism suspects without trial.

== Public statements ==
In an October 2001 interview with PBS, Harris was sharply critical of Canadian immigration policy. He stated that "Montreal is the place you probably want to be if you are an Algerian extremist" and that Canada's then-current immigration policy was "making Canada a kind of Islamic extremist aircraft carrier for the launching of major assaults against the U.S. mainland".

In a June 2002 interview with 60 Minutes, Harris stated that there were at least 50 terrorist groups then operating within Canada, including the Irish Republican Army, Hezbollah, Hamas and Al Qaeda.

In an April 2006 interview, Harris expressed his support for the Conservative government's apparent willingness to crack down on terrorism, and praised the antiterror legislation introduced by the previous Liberal government.
