= Duma (2011 film) =

- Directed by: Abeer Zeibak Haddad
- Written by: Abeer Zeibak Haddad
- Produced by: Suheil Haddad
- Release date: 2011
- Running time: 51 minutes
- Country: Israel
- Language: Arabic

Duma ("Dolls" in Arabic) is a 2011 Israeli documentary about sexual violence against Arab women in Palestinian and Arabian society. The film was written and directed by Abeer Zeibak Haddad and produced by her husband Suheil Haddad. It was the first film by a female Arabic speaker to confront the taboo of sexual violence against Arab women, who are frequently forced into silence to preserve their family’s honor. The film chronicles the stories of five women who experienced sexual abuse as young girls, some of them being victimized by their own family members. The documentary was supported by the Israeli Authority for TV and Film, the New Foundation for Cinema and TV and the Green House project.

== Synopsis ==
Zeibak Haddad, creates a puppet theater show that deals with child sexual abuse, after no one comes to the show because of the difficulty that the subject imposes, she decides to take her camera and journey from the north to the south of the country and document Arab women who have experienced sexual violence and hear their stories. Five protagonists dare to reveal the sexual abuse they endured in their close circle of family and friends. They all look for a way to express and to break the cycle of silence which has been imposed on them by family and society; their goal is to be heard, whether in privacy or out in the open. Their ambition is to turn the tables and lead abused women away from the circle of silence, shame and asphyxia, and towards self acceptance and the realization that they are allowed to continue to live.

The camera encourages the women to gently sift through dark pits with the goal of revealing the pain, giving voice to it and finally freeing them of the need to shoulder the terrible secret alone, providing them with some relief from the humiliation and loneliness they have been living with for years.

== Background ==
In 2000, Haddad first got interested in the subject of child sexual abuse after reading an article about it in children's literature. She started an enrichment program on the subject at the early childhood education center in Jaffa where she worked. Haddad also decided that she would write a play; having never written one before, she started a draft and forwarded it to Ronit Hakham, an Israeli playwright, and together with director Shir Freibach, they created the play Chocolate. The play used actors, puppets and video to tell the story of a girl who had been sexually abused at a playground. Chocolate premiered at the 2006 Haifa Children's Theater Festival where it won four prizes. Haddad wanted to present the play in Arab schools and communities, but they refused to stage the production because of the controversial nature of the subject.

In 2009, she switched her medium to documentation, attending a year long seminar in Nazareth organized by the Second Authority for Television and Radio where she received instruction from professionals in the field. After completion of the program, she set out to find some Arab women who would agree to speak with her on camera about the sexual assault they had endured. According to her, "everyone I talked to said I wouldn’t find one woman to participate". She eventually found five women willing to talk to her; one appeared on camera, but the remaining four told of their abuse with their backs to the camera or had their faces blurred to prevent them from being recognized. They feared social and familial repercussions which could have resulted in them being murdered or an honor killing.

"He told me many times that no one must know, because if someone knew, my parents would get divorced. To keep the unity of the extended family, that’s why I kept silent. Okay, this way at least, one is hurt, not everyone."

People told me that it would be impossible to find women who were willing to come forward and talk about these issues in front of a camera. This is because these women fear negative retributions from the community, and bringing shame to their family. Some women have lived with the secret of being sexually abused for years, they are even afraid to tell their own mothers. Even though I spoke with many women who had suffered from sexual abuse, only five of the women agreed to be filmed. Out of those five only one agreed to have her face shown. It took months to find these women. Additionally I was afraid that society would not accept the film, I am finding that now people are very open to seeing the film. My mission is to show this film to as many audiences as possible, it does not matter what country a person is from or what religion they associate themselves with, I just want to show it to as many people as possible.

— Abeer Zeibak Haddad,

== Reception and awards ==
The film was screened in cultural centers, cinemas, universities, and schools; afterwards there was a discussion with audience members and students. The film was featured at the Mumbai International Film Festival (2012), the Belgrade Documentary International Film Festival (2012), and the International Documentary Film Festival CRONOGRAF in Moldova (2012). It was also featured at the Urban TV festival in Madrid (2012), winning an award for Best Television and Video Production.

Film critic Qais Qassem, in a review for Tsaloniki Film Festival wrote, "Duma indicates a new tendency in Palestinian cinema towards moving to self-display and criticism, which first started emerging in features with Elia Suleiman’s films and appears to be gaining ground". Dr. Eylem Atakav, wrote in The Huffington Post (UK), that "Duma (Dolls) is an extremely powerful documentary...the film creates a space for women to break the barrier of silence and fear and speak overtly about their experiences of rape and abuse...we need more films that scream the pain women go through while their identities and bodies are violated. Haddad's film does so brilliantly as it is brutally realistic; revealingly provocative, and exceedingly enthralling".

Amy Kronish, author of the book World Cinema: Israel said "this is a film about very brave women who are speaking out about a terrible tragedy in their lives, about a subject that is still difficult for them to confront. For years, they were afraid of speaking out because they could be murdered by their male relatives for bringing disgrace to their families...the film is beautifully shot – the women are shot from the back, looking out a window, one is looking out at the sea, or slightly distorted in a window or mirror, or shot from behind in a moving car. One is also shot surrounded by a field of Sabras, a plant that symbolizes the deep contradiction between aggression and nature. This element of anonymity in the film makes it so authentic and emphasizes the fact that these four women are a voice for all those who have suffered similar experiences in their youth".

== See also ==
- Honor Diaries
- Social stigmatization
- Women in Arab societies
- Sexual taboo in the Middle East
- Arab culture
- List of Palestinian films
