= Canadian Coalition for Democracies =

Canadian political action organization

The Canadian Coalition for Democracies (CCD) was a Canadian political action organization that advocated greater support for Israel, India, and minorities in the Muslim world such as Christians, Copts, Baháʼís, Assyrians, and Ismailis.

The CCD strove to maintain a non-partisan, issue-oriented approach to its objectives. Its Executive Director was a former Conservative Party aide and its founders included two future Conservative cabinet ministers, but its founders also included a number of lifelong Liberal party supporters.

CCD was formed in 2003 as a result of a number of perceived stumbles by the then-Liberal government in its foreign policies and its approach to the US government, culminating in demonstrations organized in Canada by supporters of the War in Iraq.

== Omar Alghabra controversy ==
The group made news in 2005 when it accused federal Liberal candidate Omar Alghabra of making Islamist comments upon winning his party's nomination. Alghabra's campaign said that CCD founder and Executive Director Naresh Raghubeer was a former executive assistant to Alghabara's rival Raminder Gill. CCD was accused of libel by Alghabra and issued a press release withdrawing its earlier charge when evidence surfaced showing that Alghabra did not make the comments in question. The Muslim Canadian Congress issued a statement accusing CCD of "whipping up anti-Muslim hysteria".

== Pro-Israel advocacy ==
The CCD placed particular emphasis on calling for the Canadian government to adopt a pro-Israel stance, and rejected providing Palestinians with any development or humanitarian assistance and was very critical of the Muslim world and, in particular, of groups such as Hamas and Hezbollah. It expressed its views through op-ed contributions to Canadian newspapers; through press releases; and in its public message forum. While it had praised select individual senior Liberals such as former Minister of Justice Irwin Cotler for their pro-Israel positions, the CCD more generally attacked the Liberal Party of Canada for allegedly failing to extend support to Israel. In an op-ed published in the National Post in March 2004, CCD Director Alastair Gordon drew a direct analogy between the foreign policy of the then-Liberal government of Canada toward the Israeli-Palestinian conflict and the practices of the Nazi German era, stating that the Canadian government "believed [that the West Bank] should be Judenrein (Jew-free)... Canada validated the racist grievance of the Jew-killers." This charge was repeated in a citation awarding Conservative politician Stockwell Day the CCD's parliamentarian of the year award..

== Pro-India advocacy ==
The CCD also promoted greater support for India; in 2004 then-Executive Director Naresh Raghubeer penned an opinion piece advocating that India be given a permanent seat on the United Nations Security Council..

The CCD also supported India's claims to Kashmir and successfully advocated for Canada to establish a trade office in Gujarat despite an international diplomatic boycott of the Indian state's government and its Chief Minister Narendra Modi due to the anti-Muslim riots in Gujarat in 2002 and the government's role in them.

== Other issues ==
CCD advocated that Canada take a hard line against countries such as Iran and North Korea, and supported continued Canadian involvement in Afghanistan.

It was also vocal in its opposition to the Tamil Tigers of Sri Lanka, and opposed Muslim rule in Sudan.

In 2006, the CCD organized a demonstration in support of Denmark against criticism for publishing cartoons depicting Muhammad.

The CCD generally supported the policies of the Conservative Party government of Stephen Harper, and the organization's leadership has urged its members to view support for the Conservative Party of Canada as equivalent to support for Israel. When it finds fault with Conservative policy, as for example it did when Canada did not change its votes significantly on fall 2006 UN General Assembly resolutions relating to Israel and the Middle East conflict, the CCD issued a press release that was critical but that avoided any of the more strident rhetoric directed against the Liberals.

== Membership ==
Among the supporters of CCD was Canadian cabinet minister, Conservative Member of Parliament for Thornhill and former journalist Peter Kent. Fellow cabinet minister Tony Clement was formerly the head of CCD's Advisory Board. Other supporters included former Conservative candidates Michael Mostyn and Rochelle Wilner.

CCD founder and former executive director Naresh Raghubeer is a former aide to former Ontario Progressive Conservative MPP and federal Conservative Party candidate Raminder Gill. Raghubeer was formerly National Policy Director of the Canada India Foundation.

The CCD's Senior Fellows were David Harris and Salim Mansur.
