= Qanta Ahmed =

British-American physician

- Born: United Kingdom
- Education: University of Nottingham
- Occupations: Physician, author, women's rights activist, journalist, public commentator
- Medical career
- Field: Sleep disorders
- Institutions: Stony Brook University, New York University
- Website: qantaahmed.com

Qanta A. Ahmed is a British-American physician who came to prominence as a doctor specializing in sleep disorders. She has also worked as an author, women's rights activist, journalist, and public commentator.

== Early life and education ==
Ahmed is the daughter of Pakistani immigrants. She grew up in Coventry, studying at Coventry School: Bablake, before going on to graduate from the University of Nottingham. She went to New York City for medical training in 1992. Without a US visa to extend her stay, she left to practice in Saudi Arabia for a year. She wrote down her daily experiences as a woman practicing medicine, and published them in a book. In June 2013, Ahmed visited Israel, speaking at universities and research institutes around the country.

Ahmed became a US citizen in 2015, while maintaining her British citizenship. She currently resides in New York City.

== Career ==
=== Medical ===
Ahmed practiced medicine in the National Guard Health Affairs in the Kingdom of Saudi Arabia. She returned to the US in 1996 and practiced at the Medical University of South Carolina in Charleston, South Carolina and sleep disorders medicine in Garden City at the NYU Langone Sleep Disorders Center.

Ahmed is currently a Clinical Associate Professor in the Department of Medicine at NYU Grossman Long Island School of Medicine where she specializes in Sleep Medicine. Previously, Ahmed was associate professor of medicine at the State University of New York (SUNY) at Stony Brook. She has also served as an Honorary Professor at School of Health and Life Sciences at Glasgow Caledonian University in Scotland, and an Honorary Fellow at the Technion-Israel Institute of Science and Technology in Haifa, Israel. In 2014, she was appointed media spokeswoman for the American Academy of Sleep Medicine.

=== Writing ===
Ahmed is the author of In the Land of Invisible Women, an account of her experiences as a physician in Saudi Arabia.

Ahmed has also worked as a public commentator, writing on issues ranging from medicine, to politics, feminism, Islam, and current affairs. She has also contributed articles to The Spectator, Huffington Post, The New York Post, The Daily Caller, USA Today, The Guardian, The Jerusalem Post, and The Daily Telegraph. She has also worked as media pundit for Al-Jazeera, CNN and Fox News.

== Views ==
=== Islam and Islamism ===
Ahmed is not an orthodox practicing Muslim and is critical of elements of Islam, the treatment of women in some contemporary Islamic societies, and the ideology of Islamism. She states that Islamists reject the liberal teachings of Islam and seek to impose a more sectarian strand of the faith on others through violence, exploiting democracy and manipulating non-Muslims who mistakenly ally themselves with Islamic extremists. Ahmed identifies herself as a feminist, and has also denounced radical Islam (violent jihadism and antisemitism in particular), and has been described by the media as a Muslim reformist.

Ahmed stated that she formed many of her views after being denied a visa extension in the US after finishing medical training, and due to facing difficulties staying in America, accepted a job offer in Saudi Arabia "on a whim." She hoped that as a Muslim she would feel more accepted in Saudi society and be able to explore her religious heritage, but quickly found herself relegated to second-class medicineship due to her status as a woman, and disrespected or treated as inferior by her subordinates. She stated that while she was impressed by her Saudi colleagues' attachment to their faith, she also felt oppressed by compulsory veil laws in public and was shocked by the social shunning, racism, and antisemitism she witnessed, as well as unsound medical practices that were encouraged as a result of Saudi Arabia's governance under hardline Islamic laws.

In her commentary, Ahmed has argued "Islamists exploit democratic institutions to further their sectarian aims" and that "Exposing Islamists as dangerous totalitarians is not an act of anti-Muslim bigotry but an essential defense of both liberal democracy and Islam." Ahmed has cited the regime of Mohamed Morsi in Egypt as an example of the consequence of Islamists rising to power, and has said that not all Islamists are violent but use many different means to assert themselves.

Ahmed has called on the US State Department to designate the Muslim Brotherhood as a Foreign Terrorist Organization. She stated "By encouraging separatism and indoctrinating its members with the totalitarian tenets of 20th-century Islamism, the Muslim Brotherhood seeks to disrupt the fabric of democracy."

In 2018, she defended Boris Johnson over his comments regarding the burqa and niqāb. She stated "I am fully supportive of Boris Johnson’s rejection of the niqab. And I wonder how many of the former Foreign Secretary’s critics understand my religion, what this form of dress represents and the subjugation it implies."

In 2019, Ahmed criticized US Congresswoman Ilhan Omar for her comments on the 9/11 attacks in which Omar said “CAIR [Council on American–Islamic Relations] was founded after 9/11 because they recognized that some people did something, and that all of us were starting to lose access to our civil liberties.” Ahmed described Omar's statement as an insult to both Muslims and the victims of 9/11. She furthermore disputed the factual accuracy of Omar's assertion about the foundation of CAIR, disputed her claims that Muslims in the US have been subjected to government-sponsored discrimination and concluded by stating "Omar should be honest. There is no escaping the fact that the atrocities of 9/11 were not simply committed by some people. Islamist jihadists were responsible and they came from within the Muslim fold."

Ahmed has also critiqued the term "Islamophobia," arguing that it has become a "shield for jihadis" and that the term should not be used in hate crime legislation in Western societies as it enables Islamists to exploit it. When discussing physical and verbal attacks against Muslims such as the Christchurch mosque attack and comments made by Australian senator Fraser Anning, Ahmed stated "This kind of bigotry is not hard to recognise or condemn. Nor does it require a new law. All of this matters because, while we’re getting better at thwarting terrorist attacks, we’re still fighting their ideological underpinning. As a secular pluralistic democracy, we have weapons: intellectual scrutiny, critical thinking and above all the insight to command the language of this war of ideas. And to use the word Islamophobia when talking about anti-Muslim xenophobia is to use the vocabulary and adopt the rulebook of the Islamists who wish to obfuscate their intent."

=== Zionism ===
In 2010, Ahmed described herself as an "Accidental Zionist" and that "Eretz Yisrael is a vital shelter, an only shelter, from lethal, genocidal anti-Semitism... If we care for wider humanity at all, we must all be 'accidental' Zionists and want for the Jews, for the Israelis, what each Muslim already has for themselves: a future, a nation and a faith, secured."

Ahmed is opposed to boycotts against Israel and opposes the BDS movement. In 2013, Ahmed said she opposed both the Israeli occupation of the Palestinian Territories and also opposed Israel withdrawing from the Palestinian territories, arguing that Palestinians have "a virulent Jihadist ideology" and leaders calling for Israel's destruction. After interviewing her, the Ha'aretz opined that Ahmed "tends to identify more with dispossessed Jews than with dispossessed Palestinians".

In 2025, Ahmed said Hamas were not the only actors in the October 7 attacks; Palestinian civilians also participated. Thus, she said, regarding Palestinian people that "Your hatred dehumanizes you and debases all of humanity."

== See also ==
- Zuhdi Jasser
- Tarek Fatah
- Mohammad Tawhidi
