= Grandizo Munis =

Mexican left-wing politician (1912–1989)

- Born: April 18, 1912; Torreón, Mexico
- Died: February 4, 1989 (aged 76); Paris, France
- Political party: Izquierda Comunista de España

Grandizo Munis (18 April 1912 – 4 February 1989) was a Mexican-born Spanish Trotskyist politician turned left-communist following his break with the Fourth International.

== Biography ==
Grandizo first entered revolutionary politics as a member of the Izquierda Comunista de España (ICE). This group was led by Andreu Nin and was in sympathy with the views of Leon Trotsky and therefore affiliated to the International Communist League.

Trotsky was opposed to the name of the group, which he argued was imprecise and badly expressed the program of the Bolshevik-Leninists. In addition, he entered into a dispute with Nin and the ICE when they refused his suggestion to enter the youth organisation of the Spanish Socialist Workers Party (PSOE). The majority of the ICE then split with Trotsky, leaving a small remnant grouping which included Grandizo Munis.

With the beginning of the Spanish Civil War in 1936, Munis was a member of the tiny Seccion Bolshevik-Leninista. This organisation sought to influence the ranks of the larger Workers' Party of Marxist Unification (POUM) and also worked closely with the more left-wing anarchists of the Durruti Column.

The Trotskyists were among the very few to oppose the Popular Front government and openly took part in the May Days of 1937. This event led to their suppression by the government, which was now dominated by the Stalinists. This meant that Munis was forced into illegality and had to flee for fear of his life, a number of Spanish anti-fascist fighters

He was arrested on February 13, 1938 but the next year, shortly before the fall of Barcelona, he was able to escape the Monjuic Prison, cross Franco's lines and eventually pass over the border to France. He made his fate public in an interview with the French Trotskyist newspaper La Lutte Ouvrière published in its February 24 and March 3, 1939, issues.

In the spring of 1940, Munis fled France to Mexico, where he had a meeting with Trotsky, then to New York, where he attended the May 1940 Emergency Conference of the Fourth International. Back in Mexico, that August, he spoke at Leon Trotsky's funeral.

Munis spent the remainder of the war years in Mexico, where he reestablished a section of the Fourth International among Spanish exiles. He managed to produce two issues of a printed magazine 19 de Julio, then began a mimeographed periodical, Contra la Corriente. Some of the articles in these journals were translated into the SWPs theoretical organ Fourth International. He was assisted in this effort by the French surrealist poet Benjamin Péret, who had also fled to Mexico.

During the war and immediate post-war years, Munis began to have differences with the Fourth International Secretariat based in New York, and with the Socialist Workers Party of the United States. These first began with a critique of the SWP leaders' actions during the Minneapolis trials. On an ideological level, he claimed that the USSR was no longer a workers' state of any kind, but state capitalist. He also rejected united fronts with Stalinist parties and key parts of the Transitional Program, including nationalization and a government of traditional workers parties. He also had organizational differences with the Fourth International. He was supported in some of these criticisms by Natalya Sedova, the widow of Leon Trotsky. At the Second World Congress of the Fourth International Munis blocked with Max Shachtman of the Workers Party but was eventually condemned by the Secretariat.

After the war, Munis settled in Paris and began publishing a new periodical Revoluciòn, which proclaimed its official break with the Fourth International in November 1948. By 1949, his followers were calling themselves the Grupo Comunista Internacionalista de España. In 1951 Munis and J. Costa returned to Spain to organize an underground movement in the wake of the Barcelona tramway strike. They were unsuccessful and arrested by the Francoist authorities in 1952 and sentenced to ten years' imprisonment. Munis was released in 1957 and returned to Paris, where he began publishing a new organ, Alarma. With the relaxation of the Francoist regime in the late 1960s and early 1970s, the Munis group was able to establish a small following within Spain, though Munis himself continued to live in France. By the time of Franco's death, in the mid-1970s, this group numbered about 50 people. However, differences between the exiles in Paris and the younger personnel in Barcelona precipitated a purge by the exiles of the Spanish group until there were only two or three members left in 1983.

Munis also had followers in several other countries, and in the late 1970s these were organized into the Revolutionary Workers Ferment with sections in France, Italy, Greece and the United States. The American group, the FOR Organizing Committee of the United States or FOCUS, left in 1981 in solidarity with the expelled Spanish members.

Munis wrote many articles and books in his life, the best known being A Second Communist Manifesto and a history of the Spanish Civil War.

== Selected works ==
- Unions Against Revolution
- Qué son las Alianzas Obreras Madrid : Ediciones Comunismo, 1934
