= FOR Organizing Committee of the United States =

The FOR Organizing Committee in the United States or FOCUS was a small group of leftists in the United States. It was the US section of the Revolutionary Workers Ferment, known by its Spanish initials FOR (Fomento Obrero Revolutionario).

FOCUS was founded by Stephen Schwartz, a writer in San Francisco, who entered into correspondence with the FOR group and began contributing to its French journal Alarme. After visiting France in 1979 and having discussions with the leader of the FOR tendency, G. Munis, Schwartz returned to the US and established FOCUS. The group began to publish a periodical, The Alarm based in San Francisco.

FOCUS was expelled from FOR in 1981, after it defended the Spanish section which had also been purged by Munis. Thereafter, FOCUS focused on the weakness of the original FOR analysis, agreeing that the mainstream trade unions were a brake on the proletarian revolution. by October 1983 they had come to the conclusion that the revolutionary workers should enter the small Anarcho-syndicalist unions such as the CNT and IWW. The FOCUS group entered the IWW in early 1984 and, according to them, were "received positively by the other wobblies.

By this time, Schwartz had dropped out of the organization, and The Alarm had been moved from San Francisco to Portland, Oregon where FOCUS had its largest following.
