= Khaleel Mohammed =

Guyanese-American professor (1955–2022)

- Born: 1955; Guyana
- Died: January 2022 (aged 66–67)
- Education: Imam Muhammad ibn Saud Islamic University, Concordia University, McGill University, Brandeis University
- Occupations: Professor of Religion, Director of Center for Islamic and Arabic Studies
- Employer: San Diego State University
- Known for: Academic work in Islamic Law, Inter-faith marriage advocacy, Commentary on Israel in Islam

Khaleel Mohammed (1955 – January 2022) was a Guyanese-born professor of Religion at San Diego State University (SDSU), in San Diego, California, a member of Homeland Security Master's Program, and, as of January 2021, Director of SDSU's Center for Islamic and Arabic Studies.

== Biography ==
Khaleel Mohammed was born in Guyana. He was a Muslim, and studied Islamic law at Imam Muhammad ibn Saud Islamic University in Riyadh, Saudi Arabia. After completing an MA in Judaism and Islam at Concordia University, Montreal, he obtained a PhD in Islamic law at McGill University in Montreal. He then moved to Brandeis University where he completed a two year Kraft-Hiatt postdoctoral fellowship on the subject of the imagery of the Jew in Hadith literature.

== Academic career ==
Mohammed's specialties were Islam, Islamic Law, and Comparative Religion. His research interests included Islamic and Arabic studies, Islamic law (classical and modern), comparative religion, Jewish/Christian/Islamic encounter, Qur'anic exegesis (classical and modern), hadith, gender/sex issues and sexuality in Islam, terrorism, antisemitism in Islam, Arab-Israeli relations, and reform in Islam. He was a proponent of inter-faith marriage (between Muslim women and non-Muslim men) without the traditionally required conversion of the non-Muslim spouse, and was a registered marriage-officiant.

Mohammed taught courses on World Religions, The Qur'an, Religious Violence and Non-Violence, Sex and Gender in Islam, and Abrahamic Religions.courses_khaleel mohammed

Mohammed has testified as an "expert witness" for the prosecution in cases involving allegations of terrorism-related activities.

== Controversies ==
Khaleel Mohammed has stated that in some cases foreign-born Imams "are a threat to Canada" and that "They come from Bangladesh, South Africa, Guyana, Egypt and Syria etc. and they bring their cultural baggage with them." He has also suggested that the fact that immigrants native languages are used in Canadian mosques is a problem and that "They (Canadian imams) have to speak English...All mosques I've been to -- give or take five per cent -- have been using an overwhelming amount of Arabic".

Mohammed has been both praised and lambasted by far right and Zionist publications such as Campus Watch. He has appeared in Obsession: Radical Islam's War Against the West a film widely criticized as Islamophobic and produced by the anti-Muslim Clarion Project. Mohammed later claimed to have been misquoted, and accused the producers of the film of demonizing Muslims in a response titled ""An 'Obsession' to obscure the truth" on the Religion News Service.

He stated that he was once accused of being racist, for having stated that "95% of contemporary Muslims are exposed to anti-Semitic teachings". He has received hate mail for his statements.

=== Teachings on Israel ===
Mohammed attracted attention for a 2004 interview in which he stated that Qur'an 5:21, and the medieval exegetes of the Qur'an, say that Israel belongs to the Jews. He translates it thus:

"[Moses said]: O my people! Enter the Holy Land which God has written for you, and do not turn tail, otherwise you will be losers."

Mohammed said of Israel, "It's in the Muslim consciousness that the land first belonged to the Jews. It doesn't matter if the Jews were exiled 500 years or 2000 years, the Holy Land, as mentioned in Quran belongs to Moses and his people, the Jews." He stated that the issues about the land of Israel ought not to be settled via references to scripture, but rather by the use of human rights legislation.

== Death ==
Mohammed died at the age of sixty-six in January 2022. No cause of death was announced.

== Published works ==
"Islam and Violence," Cambridge University Press, 2019. "David in the Muslim Tradition: A study of the Bathsheba Affair" Lexington Press, 2014. "Introduction to World Religions," Polymath Learning, 2014. "Coming to Terms with the Qur'an," IPI, 2008. Co-edited with Andrew Rippin

- "Assessing English Translations of the Qur’an", Middle East Quarterly, Spring 2005, Volume XII (2): 59-72.
- "Revisiting Tyan on the issue of the Early Islamic Judicature" Islamic Studies, Autumn 2004 (3): 447-55.
- "Muslim Exegesis, the Hadith and the Jews" Judaism, #209/210 (53) Winter-Spring 2004: 3-11.
- "A Muslim Perspective on Human Rights", Social Science and Modern Society (Volume 41, #2), January/February 2004: 29-35.
- "Probing the Identity of the Sacrificial Son in the Qur’an", Journal of Religion and Culture (13), 1999, Concordia University: 125-38.
- "The Foundations of the Muslim Prayer". Medieval Encounters (5), March 1999, E.J.Brill: 17-28.
- "Demonizing the Jew: Examining the Antichrist Traditions in the Sahihayn". Co-author: Professor Kadir Baksh. Journal of Religion and Culture (12) 1998, Concordia University: 151-64.
- "Abraham Geiger and Heinrich Graetz: A Comparison of their Different Perspectives on Jewish History", Journal of Religion and Culture (11) 1997, Concordia University: 141-60.
- "The Concept of Abrogation in the Qur’an". Published under the culturally arabized version of his name, Allama Dr. Abu Yusuf Khaleel Al-Corentini. Journal of Religion and Culture (10) 1996, Concordia University: 63-76.
- The Jewish and Christian Influences in the Eschatological Imagery of Sahih Muslim, published Concordia University Montreal, Quebec, Canada, 1997, under his full name: Khaleelul Iqbal Mohammed".
- "The Art of Heeding" in Interfaith Dialogue at the Grass Roots Level. Ecumenical Press. 2008
- "The Identity of the Qur’an’s Ahl al-Dhikr", in Coming to Terms with the Qur’an. Ed. by Andrew Rippin and Khaleel Mohammed. Islamic Publications INternational. 2008.
- "Islam and Human Rights", in Religion and Human Rights, ed. Adam Seligman. Interreligious Center on Public Life, Hollis Publishing: 2004: 55-68.
- "Al-Rida's Argumentation Against the Leaders of the People of the Book, the Magians, the Sabeans and Others" (excerpted from Al-Istibsar). Translated as chapter for Theology of Shi‘ism: A Debate Between Imam Ali Rida and People of Other Beliefs. Ed. By Saeed Argomand. Global Publications, State University of New York, Binghamton, 1999.

=== Translations ===
- World of Our Youth. Translation of Husayn Fadlallah’s Duniya al-Shabab. Montreal, Damascus and Beirut: Organization for Advancement of Islamic Knowledge, Montreal, 1998.

=== Book reviews and encyclopedia entries ===
- "Sex, Sexuality and Family in the Qur’an", Encyclopedia article for Blackwell Encyclopedia of the Qur’an. Ed. Andrew Rippin. 2006.
- "A New Introduction to Islam", by Daniel Brown. Middle Eastern Studies Bulletin, 38 (1), June 2004: 78-79.
- "An Introduction to Islam". by David Waines. Middle East Quarterly, XI (3), Summer 2004: 86.
- "Islam Under Siege", by Akbar Ahmed. In Islamic Studies, Spring 2004 (Volume 43/1): 132-35.
- "Excellence and Precedence", by Asma Afsaruddin. H-Mideast-Medieval, H-Net Reviews, 2004. Available online on the H-Net Web site.
- "The Qur’an-A Contemporary Translation", by Ahmed Ali. Middle East Studies Association Bulletin, Volume. XXXVI (1) Summer 2002: 47. Article also available online on the Arizona.edu Website.
- "The Koran: A Very Short Introduction", by Michael Cook. H-Mideast-Medieval, H-Net Reviews, February 2003. Available also available online on the H-Net Web site. Electronically Accessible Publications
- "Produce your proof: Muslim exegesis, the Hadith, and the Jews", Published: Spring 2004.
