= Egomania (Mania) =

- Mania episode
- Episode no.: Episode 1
- Directed by: Mark Soldinger
- Narrated by: Bernard Hill
- Original air date: 5 February 2007

Episode chronology
← Previous —	Next → "Pyromania"

"Egomania" was the first episode of a three-part documentary series on Channel 4 made by Firecracker Films about people who are diagnosed with narcissistic personality disorder (NPD). The other two parts of the series, called Mania, were called "Pyromania" and "Erotomania". The film was directed by Mark Soldinger and narrated by actor Bernard Hill.

Sam Wollaston of The Guardian criticised the documentary but found its closing footage of Sam Vaknin compelling.
