= Lulu Schwartz =

American Sufi journalist and writer (born 1948)

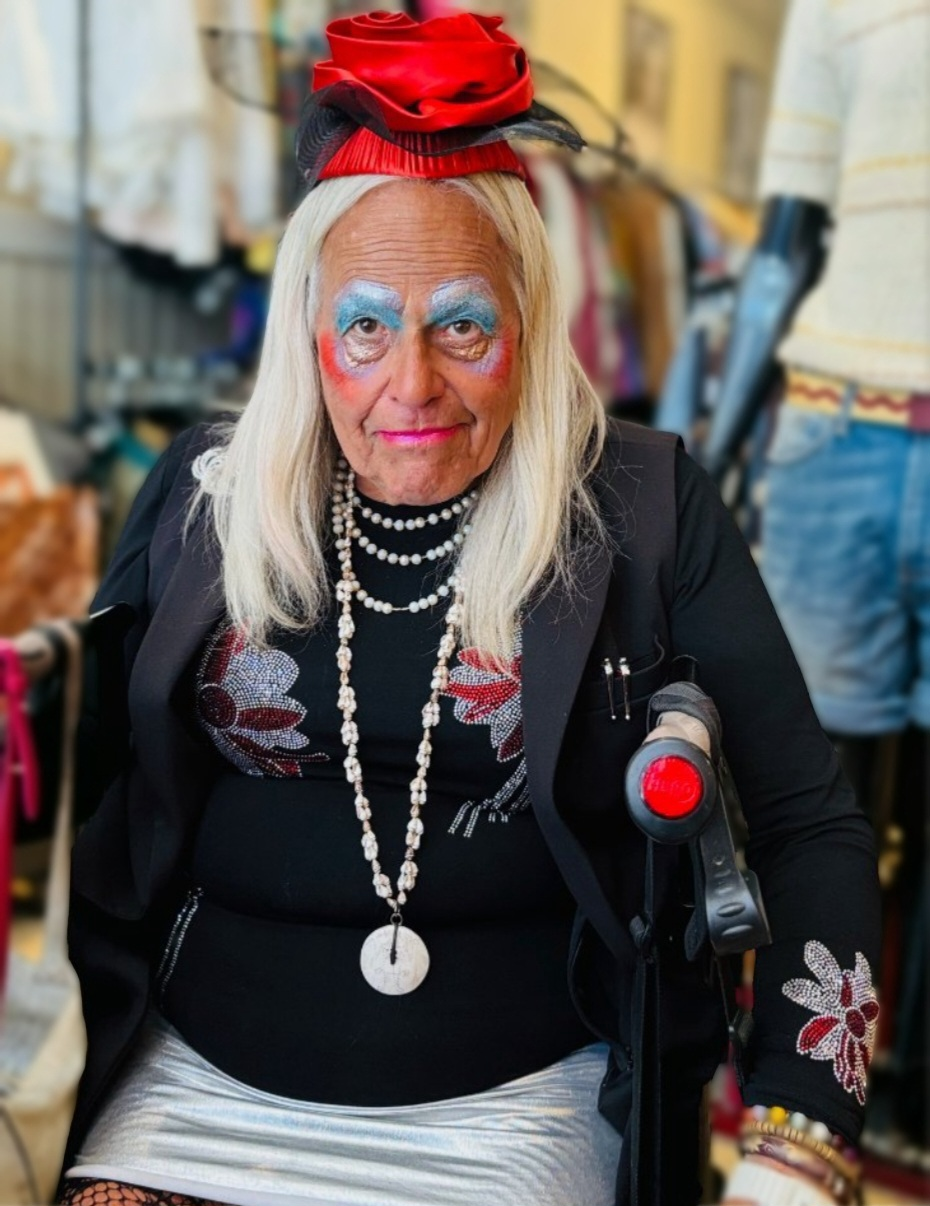
- Lulu Schwartz in 2025
- Born: September 9, 1948 (age 78); Columbus, Ohio, U.S.
- Occupation: Writer

Lulu Schwartz (born Stephen A. Schwartz, September 9, 1948, and also known previously as Stephen Suleyman Schwartz) is a writer. She has been published in a variety of media, including The Wall Street Journal. Schwartz worked as a senior policy consultant and held the role of director of the "Islam and Democracy Project" at the Foundation for Defense of Democracies (FDD), a neoconservative think-tank based in Washington, D.C. Schwartz is also the founder and executive director of the Washington, D.C.-based Center for Islamic Pluralism and served as a member of Folks Magazine's editorial board from 2011 to 2012.

A student of Sufism since the 1960s, Schwartz has been an adherent of the Hanafi school of Sunni Islam since 1997. Schwartz was a key figure in the neoconservative movement that held considerable influence in the administration of George W. Bush. Schwartz's criticism of Islamic fundamentalism, especially the Wahhabi movement within Sunni Islam, has attracted controversy. Alongside fellow neoconservative writer Daniel Pipes, Schwartz has been a major critic of Islamism and has depicted Islamists as the new ideological nemesis of the West after the fall of Nazi Germany and Soviet Union.

Strongly critical of the AKP government in Turkey, Schwartz has described it as a hostile pan-Islamist threat following the Gaza flotilla raid incident in 2010. Schwartz has also condemned the Iranian government, asserting that American academia is being threatened by the infiltration of pro-Khomeinist state agents of Iran. Schwartz's works have also been a major influence on neo-con factions that favour the severing of Saudi Arabia-U.S. relations and lobby U.S. foreign policy officials to take a hostile stance against the Saudi government.

== Early life ==
Schwartz was born in Columbus, Ohio to Horace O. Schwartz, a Jewish independent bookseller, and Eileene M. Schwartz (née McKinney), a career social services worker and the daughter of a Protestant minister. She later described both Horace and Eileene as "radical leftists and quite antireligious", Horace a "fellow traveller", and Eileene a member of the American Communist Party. Schwartz was baptized in the Presbyterian church as an infant.

The family moved to San Francisco in 1951, where Horace became a literary agent and Schwartz's brother, Geoffrey, was born. Schwartz attended Lowell High School and became affiliated with Leninist communism until 1984.

== Career ==
After college, Schwartz became a member of the Sailors' Union of the Pacific and co-founded a small Anarcho-Communist group FOCUS. The San Francisco Bay Guardian wrote of Schwartz in 1989: "As he himself readily admits, Schwartz has made a lot of enemies over the years as he performed a series of dizzying ideological leaps: from the Industrial Workers of the World to meeting with Oliver North and the Outreach Group on Central America in the basement of the White House, from minuscule Trotskyist sects meeting in North Beach cafes to serving as a U.S. press representative for a Contra leader.

In the 1990s, Schwartz spent a decade as a staff writer for the San Francisco Chronicle and was a member of the local trade union at the Chronicle, a branch of the Newspaper Guild. At the end of 1997, Schwartz converted to Islam. In 1999, she left the Chronicle and moved to Sarajevo, Bosnia and Herzegovina, living there for the next 18 months. During the NATO bombing of Serbia in 1999, she published a piece in the Chronicle accusing the Serbs of countless crimes while absolving the Albanian population of Kosovo and the KLA of all responsibility regarding their involvement in the Kosovo War and brushing all Serb arguments as mere propaganda. The article was criticized by journalist Robert W. Merry for being tendentiously biased and highly inaccurate.

While in Bosnia, Schwartz published the pro-Albanian book Kosovo: Background to a War. It was criticized by historian Robert C. Austin for weak and polemical writing and for being "decidedly biased in favour of the Albanian community in Kosovo", who concluded that "When he is attempting to be an historian, Schwartz is at his worst". Schwartz also supported the Iraq War in 2003.

On March 25, 2005, Schwartz launched the Center for Islamic Pluralism. The center is a nonprofit organization based in Washington, D.C., with Schwartz as executive director.

In 2020, under the name "Stephen (Lulu) Schwartz", Schwartz ran for the San Francisco Board of Supervisors in District 3. She came in fourth, with 1,374 votes (4.82 percent of the vote). The winner was Aaron Peskin.

== Personal life ==
In 2017, Schwartz came out as a transgender woman, using the names Ashk Lejla and Lulu.

== Published works ==
External videos
- Booknotes interview with Schwartz on The Two Faces of Islam, February 2, 2003, C-SPAN

- A Sleepwalker's Guide to San Francisco: Poems from Three Lustra, 1966–1981. San Francisco: La Santa Espina, 1983.
- Brotherhood of the Sea: A History of the Sailors’ Union of the Pacific. New Brunswick, NJ: Transaction Books, 1986. ISBN 0-88738-121-9.
- Spanish Marxism vs. Soviet Communism: A History of the P.O.U.M (with Victor Alba). New Brunswick, NJ: Transaction Books, 1988. ISBN 0-88738-198-7.
- A Strange Silence: The Emergence of Democracy in Nicaragua. San Francisco: ICS Press, 1992. ISBN 1-55815-071-4.
- From West to East: California and the Making of the American Mind. New York: The Free Press, 1998. ISBN 0-684-83134-1.
- Kosovo: Background to a War. London: Anthem Press, 2000. ISBN 1-898855-56-0
- Intellectuals and Assassins: Writings at the End of Soviet Communism. New York: Anthem Press, 2001. ISBN 1-898855-55-2.
- The Two Faces of Islam: The House of Sa'ud from Tradition to Terror. New York: Doubleday, 2002. ISBN 0-385-50692-9.
- An Activist's Guide to Arab and Muslim Campus and Community Organizations in North America Los Angeles: Center for the Study of Popular Culture, 2003 ISBN 9781886442344
- Sarajevo Rose: A Balkan Jewish Notebook. London: Saqi Books, 2005. ISBN 0-86356-592-1.
- Is It Good for the Jews?: The Crisis of America's Israel Lobby. New York: Doubleday, 2006. ISBN 0-385-51025-X.
- The Other Islam: Sufism and the Road to Global Harmony. New York: Doubleday, 2008. ISBN 0-385-51819-6.
