= Alfons Heck =

Nazi Hitler Youth members (1928–2005)

Alfons Heck (3 November 1928 – 11 April 2005) was a Hitler Youth member who eventually became a Hitler Youth Officer and a fanatical adherent of Nazism during the Third Reich.

In the 1970s, decades after he immigrated to the United States via Canada, Heck began to write candidly of his youthful military experiences in news articles and two books.

Thereafter, he entered into a partnership with Jewish Holocaust survivor Helen Waterford, each presenting their differing wartime circumstances before more than 200 audiences, most notably in schools and colleges.

== Life ==
Heck was born in the Rhineland. He was raised by his grandparents at their farm in the crossroads wine country community of Wittlich, Germany. When he entered school at the age of 6, he and his classmates were first exposed to effective Nazi indoctrination by their virulently nationalistic teacher. Four years later, Heck and his classmates joined the five million in the Hitler Youth.

Heck was a good student and found learning easy. He was appointed leader of about ten other boys. By then, his indoctrination and his devotion to the proud future of Hitler's Third Reich were nearly complete.

He understood that the first rule of service to a greater Germany was to follow orders without question, and he was willing to report "suspicious actions" or comments, even by friends or family, to his leader.

At 14, all Deutsches Jungvolk were required to join the senior Hitler Youth branch, the Hitlerjugend. In part to avoid becoming an infantry officer, Heck applied to the elite Flying Hitler Youth (Flieger Hitlerjugend), although he was apprehensive about its year-long glider plane training. But within weeks he became obsessed with flying and landing gliders. His life course had changed. He would not study to be a priest, as his grandmother had hoped.

Heck devoted himself to the task of becoming a Luftwaffe fighter pilot. He had been taught to believe that living under Bolshevik-Jewish slavery was too horrible to contemplate, leaving German victory as the only alternative. Capture seemed to him worse than death. He thought that only a glorious death over the battlefield stood in the way of his sharing in Germany's inevitable triumph. His final transformation to fanaticism had begun.

He described this extended period of glider training from late 1942 until early 1944 as the happiest of his life. At 16, Heck became the youngest scholar to receive a diploma from Aeronaut's Certificate in Sailplane Flying.

Heck recalls the typical audience response to a Hitler speech in his book A Child of Hitler: Germany in the Days when God Wore a Swastika:

We erupted into a frenzy of nationalistic pride that bordered on hysteria. For minutes on end, we shouted at the top of our lungs, with tears streaming down our faces: Sieg Heil, Sieg Heil, Sieg Heil! From that moment on, I belonged to Adolf Hitler body and soul.

Heck was interviewed during the 1989 BBC documentary The Fatal Attraction of Adolf Hitler and commented about the Kristallnacht (Night of Broken Glass) in November 1938:

Until Kristallnacht, many Germans believed Hitler was not engaged in mass murder. The treatment of the Jews seemed to be a minor form of harassment of a disliked minority. But after Kristallnacht, no German could any longer be under any illusion. I believe it was the day that we lost our innocence. But it would be fair to point out that I myself never met even the most fanatic Nazi who wanted the extermination of the Jews. Certainly, we wanted the Jews out of Germany, but we did not want them to be killed.

However, the Allied invasion of France in 1944 caused his group of 180 Flying Hitler Youth, of which Heck had become the officer in charge, to be returned to the Wittlich area to organise the excavation of large anti-tank barriers on the nearby defensive Westwall. Battlefield losses raised Heck's Hitler Youth rank to Bannführer, nominally in charge of 3,000 Hitler Youth workers in the town and its 50 surrounding villages. One of his antiaircraft crews shot down a damaged B-17 bomber trying to return to its base. Later, he gave orders in a combat engagement against advancing Americans in which participants on both sides were killed. He was considered by friends and superiors to be ambitious and ruthless.

At one point, he gave orders to have an elderly Luxembourg priest shot if he dared return to the school that Heck had commandeered for his workers. The priest did not return. In another incident, he drew his pistol to shoot a Hitler Youth deserter but was prevented from doing so by a Wehrmacht sergeant. Heck admitted at the time, as well as afterwards, that he had become intoxicated by the power he wielded.

As the approaching Americans consolidated their gains, the 16-year-old Bannführer was ordered back to his Luftwaffe training base. Once there, with the suspension of training, flight candidates were being ordered to the front lines to face the American infantry. However, a Luftwaffe officer, likely for the purpose of preserving Heck's life, ordered Heck to organise the retrieval of needed radar equipment near Wittlich and then to take a four-day leave in his home town. This enabled Heck to don civilian clothes before surrendering to the advancing Americans. Unaware of his Hitler Youth rank, the American soldiers used Heck as an interpreter until French military authorities began occupying the area. The French arrested Heck, who served six months of hard labor before finally being released.

Heck was awarded an Iron Cross for his war efforts as a Hitler Youth member.

Heck was unable to believe that the atrocities perpetrated by the Nazi regime had actually taken place. Despite the difficulty of traveling within occupied Germany, he made his way to Nuremberg to witness what he could of the trials of former Nazi officers and officials.

Heck later emigrated to Canada, working in several British Columbia sawmills. He then moved to the US, where, living in San Diego, he became a Greyhound long-distance bus driver.

During the 1950s and 1960s, Alfons Heck remained silent about his wartime activities and his involvement in the Hitler Youth, but he read hundreds of books about the Third Reich, tracing the lives of surviving Nazi leaders and maintaining an interest in West German politics. He came to feel that his generation of young Germans had been callously betrayed by Nazi strategists. Of the nine and a half million German war dead, two million were teenagers, both civilians and Hitler Youth. In 1971, at the age of 43, he became disabled by heart disease. Without a productive future and increasingly frustrated by his contemporaries' failure to speak out, Heck began attending writing classes so that he might record what it was like to have been a pawn of Nazi militarism.

Heck died of heart failure at the age of 76 on April 12, 2005.

== Works ==
In 1985, he published A Child of Hitler: Germany in the Days When God Wore a Swastika (Arizona: Renaissance House, 1985), an account of his life under Nazism. He continued with The Burden of Hitler's Legacy (Frederick, Colorado: Renaissance House, 1988).

Heck began touring with Jewish Holocaust survivor Helen Waterford in 1980 to talk about their experiences before, during, and after the war. The aligned speakers became friends as they visited more than 150 universities over nine years, urging youths to avoid Hitler-type brainwashing. Colorado publisher Eleanor Ayer, who published Waterford's autobiography "Commitment to the Dead" in 1987, wrote Waterford and Heck's intertwined stories in her 1995 book Parallel Journeys.

In 1989, Heck appeared in the BBC Documentary The Fatal Attraction of Adolf Hitler. In 1991, he featured in HBO's documentary Heil Hitler Confessions Of A Hitler Youth. The film won an ACE for best documentary. In 1992, Heck was awarded an Emmy for "outstanding historical programming."

In 1991, an HBO documentary based on his books titled Heil Hitler! Confessions of a Hitler Youth was released. With Heck's narration and using archived footage, it attempted to explain how millions of the German youth of the Third Reich followed Nazi propaganda and became some of the most extreme Hitler followers.

Heck also provided testimony on parallels between the attraction of Nazism and Islamism and was featured in the documentary Obsession: Radical Islam's War Against the West.
