= Ryan Mauro =

American national security analyst

Ryan Mauro (born 1986) is an American national security analyst. He has worked for the Clarion Project and frequently appeared on Fox News providing commentary on Islamic extremism. He is currently an investigative researcher for Capital Research Center.

== Career ==
Mauro has been a contributor to FrontPage Magazine, the Middle East Forum's Islamist Watch, and to the Center for Security Policy's Secure Freedom Radio. He has also been listed as a team member of the Christian Action Network, and collaborated with ACT for America.

As a national security analyst for the Clarion Project, he has held presentations for Tactical Officers law enforcement conferences in New York and in California, and for the Homeland Security Professionals Conference in Florida. His presentations have been protested by groups such as the Council on American-Islamic Relations (CAIR). Mauro in turn claims that CAIR has ties to terrorism.

More recently, Mauro has been the founding director of the Afghan Liberty Project, which provided safe houses to Afghans at risk until it was announced it would shut down in 2022 due to lack of funding.

== Views ==
Mauro has been accused of promoting policies that criminalize Muslims and Muslim communities, and anti-Muslim conspiracy theories such as no-go zones in the United States. He has also "long warned about active Muslim terror training camps in the United States, and has argued that the Muslim Brotherhood has infiltrated the Republican Party."

He rejects that he is anti-Muslim, and has claimed that "if anyone comes away from my presentations feeling anti-Muslim, they aren't listening" and that "significant portions of each presentation are about the danger of anti-Muslim sentiment and the wonderful work of Muslims in America and abroad."

He has been described as a part of the counter-jihad movement.

== Bible theories ==
In 2018, Mauro produced a viral video on YouTube with The Doubting Thomas Research Foundation, claiming that the biblical Mount Sinai is actually the modern-day Jebel al-Lawz in Saudi Arabia. Supporting his view, he claims that the shallow underwater land bridge called the "Nuweiba Land Bridge" could have been used by Moses and the Hebrews to cross from Egypt into the Arabian Peninsula when the Red Sea parted during the Exodus.

== Works ==
- Mauro, Ryan (2005). Death to America: The Unreported Battle of Iraq. PublishAmerica. ISBN 978-1413774733.
