= Glen Jenvey =

British activist (born 1965)

Glen Jenvey (born 9 April 1965) is a British man who claims to have infiltrated, undermined and exposed Islamic extremist groups. He also states that he has infiltrated the Tamil Tigers, working for them in London. Jenvey says he used the internet to infiltrate terrorist organizations, and to have developed a relationship with Abu Hamza al-Masri through these means (via Jenvey's Islamic News website, which posed as a genuine extremist site). Recorded film footage with James Ujaama was, he claims, obtained through similar means. Jenvey said that his tapes, in which Hamza called for Jihad, were responsible for Hamza's arrest and trial.

Jenvey appeared in the film Obsession: Radical Islam's War Against the West.

== Criticism and controversy ==
On 7 January 2009, the UK tabloid newspaper The Sun ran a story saying that participants in a discussion on Ummah.com, a British Muslim internet forum, had made a "hate hit list" of British Jews to be targeted by extremists over the 2008–2009 Israel–Gaza conflict.

The UK magazine Private Eye, later said that Jenvey, posting to the forum under the pseudonym "Abuislam", had in fact created the only evidence that indicated anything other than a peaceful letter-writing campaign. The story has since been removed from The Sun's website following complaints to the UK's Press Complaints Commission. Jenvey himself admitted, in September 2009, on BBC Radio 5 Live's Donal MacIntyre show, to having fabricated and planted the posts on Ummah.com.

On 31 December 2009, Jenvey was arrested on suspicion of inciting racial hatred against Jews.
