= Obsession: Radical Islam's War Against the West =

2005 film by Raphael Shore

- DVD cover art
- Directed by: Wayne Kopping
- Written by: Wayne Kopping; Raphael Shore
- Produced by: Peter Mier; Raphael Shore
- Edited by: Wayne Kopping
- Distributed by: Clarion Project
- Release date: October 21, 2005 (Liberty Film Festival)
- Running time: 77 minutes
- Languages: English; Arabic; French; Persian

Obsession: Radical Islam's War Against the West is a 2005 documentary film about the threat of Islamism to Western civilization. The film shows Islamic radicals preaching hate speech and seeking to incite global jihad. It also draws parallels between Nazi Germany and Islamism and the West's response to those threats.

Wayne Kopping of South Africa co-wrote and directed the film. Raphael Shore, a Canadian-Israeli, co-wrote and produced the film, and is the founder of The Clarion Fund, the film's distributor. The movie has received praise from conservative media personalities such as Glenn Beck and Sean Hannity.

Segments of the movie were broadcast on CNN Headline News and in several specials on Fox News. The movie was also screened on 30 college campuses and Capitol Hill. The unusual distribution of 28 million free Obsession DVDs as an insert in over 70 newspapers, predominantly in swing states, before the United States 2008 presidential election garnered much attention, with five newspapers refusing to distribute the DVD. National Public Radio reported that it was unclear as to who funded Clarion's distribution of the DVD.

== Synopsis ==
The movie begins with the following statement:

This is a film about radical Islamic terror. A dangerous ideology, fueled by religious hatred. It's important to remember most Muslims are peaceful and do not support terror. This is not a film about them. This is a film about a radical worldview, and the threat it poses to us all, Muslim and non-Muslim alike.

The film uses many images from broadcasting networks, provided by the Middle East Media Research Institute and Palestinian Media Watch.

== Contributors ==
The following people were interviewed in the movie:

- Nonie Darwish – Egyptian-American writer
- Alan Dershowitz – American lawyer, jurist, and political commentator
- Steven Emerson – American journalist and author
- Brigitte Gabriel – Lebanese American journalist, author, and activist
- Martin Gilbert – British historian and author
- Caroline Glick – American-Israeli journalist
- Alfons Heck – was interviewed as a former member of Hitler Youth
- Glen Jenvey – British journalist
- John Loftus – American author, former US government prosecutor and former Army intelligence officer
- Salim Mansur – Indian-Canadian columnist
- Itamar Marcus – Israeli political activist, founder and director of Palestinian Media Watch
- Daniel Pipes – American writer, and political blogger
- Tashbih Sayyed – Pakistani-American scholar, journalist, and author
- Walid Shoebat – Palestinian immigrant to the United States, interviewed as a former PLO militant
- Khaled Abu Toameh – Israeli Arab journalist and documentary filmmaker
- Robert Wistrich – professor of European and Jewish history at the Hebrew University of Jerusalem
- Khaleel Mohammed

Khaleel Mohammed, an associate professor of religious studies at San Diego State University and the only Islamic Studies Professor interviewed discussed the meaning of jihad and its misuse by extremists. Mohammed later distanced himself and apologised for his participation claiming he had believed the film would be "used objectively, focusing on fanatics who seek to spread violence" rather than Islam itself.

== Production ==
Wayne Kopping co-wrote, directed, and edited the film. Raphael Shore co-wrote and produced the film. Shore, a Canadian-Israeli film writer, producer, is also founder of The Clarion Fund. Kopping and Shore previously collaborated on Relentless: The Struggle for Peace in the Middle East. Brett Halperin, named as the production manager, is an alias according to Shore.

Executive producer Peter Mier, an alias for an unnamed Canadian Jewish businessman, provided about 80 percent of the film's $400,000 budget, according to Raphael Shore. According to IRS documents obtained by the Center for Investigative Reporting, financial support for the film came from an organization named Castello Limited.

== Promotion and screenings ==
The film was initially promoted via the internet by HonestReporting and later through campus and Washington, DC screenings and later mass DVD distribution by the Clarion Fund. HonestReporting, a media watch organization run by Ephraim Shore, the twin brother of Obsession producer Raphael Shore, was involved in the initial internet-based promotion of the film. During production in 2005, HonestReporting promoted the film as one of its projects. Later when the film was released, HonestReporting promoted the film on its website describing it as an "affiliate" project. The group, in an interview with The Jewish Week, says it was not involved in the film's production.

CNN Headline News showed segments of the film, as did Fox News, which also hosted segments on its website. In November 2006, a one-hour special that included parts of the film aired on Fox seven times.

The documentary has been screened on 30 major campuses including Hofstra, Pace, USC, UCLA, NYU, and McGill.

In December 2006, U.S. Representatives Eric Cantor (R-VA), Chief Deputy Majority Whip, and Debbie Wasserman Schultz (D-FL) co-sponsored a screening of the film on Capitol Hill. Cantor's cousin and Wasserman Schultz's constituent, Daniel Cantor Wultz, was killed in an attack by an Islamic Jihad suicide bomber.

== Distribution ==
Following the failure of traditional film distributors to pick up Shore's films, The Clarion Fund retained a non-exclusive agreement to distribute Obsession, Relentless and The Third Jihad. The film was initially distributed to college campuses in 2007.

In September 2008, the Clarion Fund, in cooperation with the Endowment for Middle East Truth, distributed 28 million DVDs of the film by mail, and in newspaper advertising supplements, predominantly in swing states. The timing of the release and the unrevealed funding for the distribution, by one estimate to have cost around $50 million, stimulated controversy and speculation about who distributed the film. The Council on American–Islamic Relations filed a complaint about the distribution with the Federal Election Commission.

The film was included in the first issue, in 2008 of the publication "The Judeo-Christian View", which was sent to priests and pastors in churches and synagogues in the United States.

The DVD was also distributed in 2008 to all 30,000 members of the Republican Jewish Coalition.

In 2008, Donors Capital Fund, a nonprofit donor-advised fund, granted $17.7 million to The Clarion Fund.

=== Newspapers ===
Newspapers distributing the DVD included The New York Times, The Charlotte Observer, The Miami Herald, the Raleigh News & Observer, The Chronicle of Higher Education, and The Oregonian. The New York Times distributed approximately 145,000 DVDs in their national edition to Denver, Miami, Tampa, Orlando, Detroit, Kansas City, St. Louis, Philadelphia, and Milwaukee. According to a News & Observer blog post, whether the advertisement should be accepted was discussed, but publisher Orage Quarles made the "ultimate decision". The newspaper's vice president of display advertising noted, "Obviously, we have distributed other product samples, whether it's cereal or toothpaste."

==== Refusals to distribute ====
Many of the newspapers distributing the DVD also published articles about the film, including The Morning Call of Allentown, Pennsylvania, The Charlotte Observer, and The News & Observer of Raleigh, North Carolina. Newspapers that refused to distribute the DVD included the St. Louis Post-Dispatch, the Detroit Free Press, the News & Record of Greensboro, North Carolina, and The Plain Dealer of Cleveland, Ohio. News & Record president and publisher Robin Saul said: "It didn't meet our advertising standards. We were told its purpose was educational. We didn't see it as educational at all. It was fear-mongering and divisive." The editor John Robinson wrote: "As a journalist, my default position is to provide people with more knowledge, however troubling, rather than less. Were this truly an issue of the freedom of information, I would have argued to publish. But this was a paid advertisement presenting one side of an inflammatory issue."

New Films International acquired the film for international distribution.

== Reception ==
Conservative media praised the film. Glenn Beck described Obsession as "one of the most important movies of our lifetime". Emmett Tyrrell of CNN wrote that "Obsession is one of the most riveting films I have seen about the roots of the struggle the civilized world now faces", while Kyra Phillips encouraged CNN Newsroom viewers to see the movie which, according to her, "provides an incredible education". Additional positive reviews were published on Fox News, in National Review, in The Times Gazette (OH) and on conservative radio programs such as The Rush Limbaugh Show.

According to Christine Brim of the Center for Security Policy, the movie "has the same cultural relationship to inspiring the counter jihad that, say, Uncle Tom's Cabin had to inspiring the fight against slavery in the mid-1800s".

=== Criticism and controversy ===
Supplied to college campuses for free screenings, the film ignited controversy with 30 airing the film, while several declined including the State University of New York at the request of Jewish groups. Students attending the screenings at New York University were required to register with IsraelActivism.com with photographs of the event forwarded to Hasbara Fellowships, an organization that brings students to Israel and trains them to be pro-Israel activists on college campuses. The forwarding of names was criticised for stifling dissent and intimidating people.

Think tank researcher Jennifer Bryson gave the film a mixed review, saying that while it does show how, "Islamist radicalism poses a grave threat to the freedoms of constitutional democracies, the film largely ignores potential solutions and a host of moderate Islamic voices that have gone unheard."

The film has been criticized for "portraying Islam as a threatening religion bent on the destruction of Western civilization, interspersing incendiary commentary with images of Nazis and suicide bombing indoctrination". The Jewish Telegraphic Agency wrote: "Producers of the documentary insist that it only targets a radical minority among Muslims; however, a number of the interviewees in the documentary are on the record as describing Islam as inherently prone to hegemony."

Jack Moline, the Spiritual Leader of the Agudas Achim Congregation, described Obsession as "the protocols of the learned elders of Saudi Arabia." Aish HaTorah has been criticized by Rabbi Moline over its close links with The Clarion Fund. On the matter of the shared staff between Aish HaTorah and the Clarion Fund, Moline said "It is distressing to me that they [Aish HaTorah] would continue to have someone who has promulgated such awful, awful stuff sitting on their board or staff."

In Dearborn, Michigan, local religious leaders called a free screening of the documentary on September 11, 2008 a divisive publicity stunt. Joe Wierzbicki of the King Media Group, Russo Marsh & Rogers, and the Our Country Deserves Better PAC, said: "There is a problem with an acceptance of radical Islam in Dearborn more so than anywhere else than I know of," according to the Detroit Free Press, quoting Wierzbicki as a spokesman for a California-based public relations company hired to promote the film. Wierzbicki later said Right Reel, a distributor of conservative films, hired him.

The Council on American-Islamic Relations asked for the Federal Election Commission to investigate the Clarion Fund's DVD distribution claiming that it was an attempt to influence the 2008 US Presidential Election. As evidence of inappropriate political bias on the part of The Clarion Fund, AP cited Patriot News of Harrisburg, Pa. reporting "that a Clarion Fund Web site ran a pro-McCain article before it attracted notice and was taken down." Ari Morgenstern, a spokesman for Middle East Truth, denied that it was intended to influence the election result. Gregory Ross, spokesman for the New York-based Clarion Fund stated: "We are not telling people who to vote for, we're just saying no matter who gets in office, the American people should know radical Islam is a real threat to America. We don't feel radical Islam is getting its fair share of press."

The Endowment for Middle East Truth withdrew support for promoting the film.

After a showing on November 13, 2007 at the University of Florida, the Gainesville campus was rocked by controversy over the film. A forum entitled "Radical Islam Wants You Dead" was sponsored by Law School Republicans, prompting Patricia Telles-Irvin, the University's vice president of student affairs, to call for apology for "promoting a negative stereotype". Faculty and community members were split over the situation's inherent free speech issues. In a December 13 opinion editorial, the Tampa Tribune criticized Telles-Irvin's criticism on constitutional grounds and called for Patricia Telles-Irvin's replacement.

== See also ==
- Criticism of Islam
- Criticism of Islamism
- Islamophobia
- Islam: What the West Needs to Know
- Fitna
- Iranium
