= Islamic Reformism =

Islamic Reformism may refer to:

- Islah, an Arabic word, usually translated as 'reform'
- Islamic revival, revivalism of the Islamic religion within the Islamic tradition
- Islamic Modernism, a historical movement emerged in the 19th century that attempts to reconcile Islamic faith with modernity
- Liberalism and progressivism within Islam, a broad range of philosophy and movement that attempt to reconcile Islamic faith with liberalism or progressivism
- Calls for an "Islamic Reformation", calls — particularly in the 21st century — for a movement to reform Islam away from "fundamentalism"
