= Raheel Raza =

Canadian journalist and activist

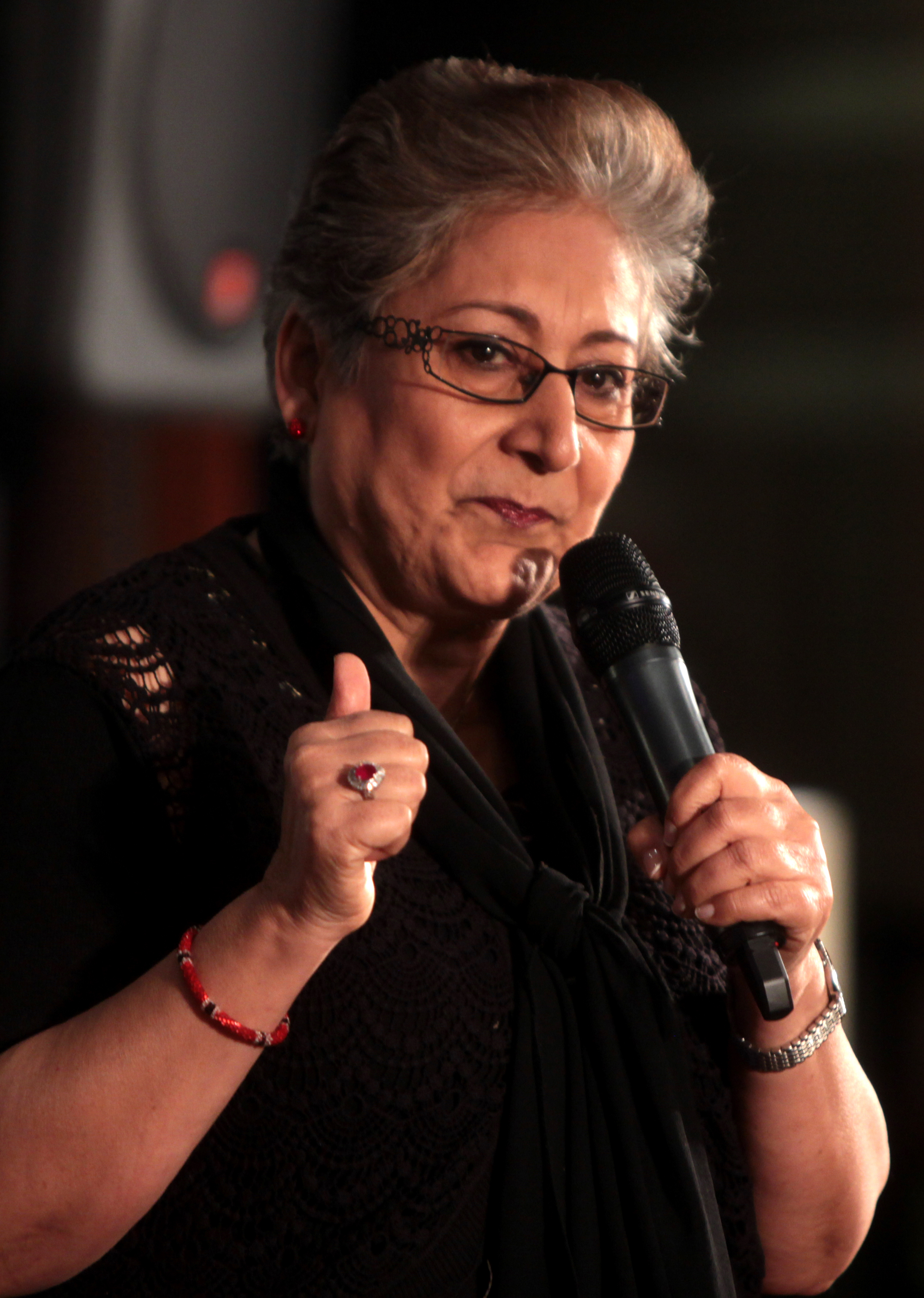
- Raza speaking in 2014.
- Born: 1949 or 1950 (age 76–77); Pakistan
- Education: Karachi University
- Occupations: Journalist, author, public speaker, media consultant, anti-racism activist, and interfaith discussion leader
- Known for: Opponent of Islamic terrorism and Islamism
- Notable work: Their Jihad... Not My Jihad!: a Muslim Canadian Woman Speaks Out (2005)
- Movement: Progressive Islam
- Awards: Constance Hamilton Award of the City of Toronto; Canadian Ethnic Journalists & Writer's Club award for excellence in journalism
- Website: Raheelraza.com

Raheel Raza (born 1949 or 1950) is a Pakistani-Canadian journalist, author, public speaker, media consultant, anti-racism activist, and interfaith discussion leader. She is among the most prominent Muslim supporters of Israel. She lives in Toronto, Ontario, Canada.

She is the author of Their Jihad, Not My Jihad: A Muslim Canadian Woman Speaks Out. She opposes Islamic extremism.

She is an honorary associate of the National Secular Society.

== Early life ==
Raza is a Pakistani currently living in Canada. She graduated from Karachi University with degrees in Psychology and English. In 1989, she, her husband and her two sons moved to Toronto.

== Activism and political views ==
=== On Islam ===
She has unequivocally condemned the September 11th terrorist attacks and all terrorism and violence in the name of religion, as well as that done in the name of Islam specifically. She claims "radicals" have their own interpretation of Islam, and that the Qur'an does not justify suicide bombings.

She has said that hatred has been preached in places of worship in Canada and urges parents to be on the alert for extremism. Raza identifies herself as a libertarian.

=== Female-led mixed gender prayers ===
Raza has been a human rights activist, and has advocated gender equality, particularly for Muslim women. She became the first woman to lead mixed-gender Muslim prayers in Canada, in 2005. Raza termed it a "silent revolution" and said she hopes to become an imam someday. She also dreams of having a mosque "for women by women". She received death threats following the 2005 prayer event.

After female imam Amina Wadud received death threats for leading mixed-gender prayers in New York City, Raza was invited by Taj Hargey in 2008 to go to Oxford and become the first Muslim-born woman to lead a mixed-gender British congregation in Friday prayers. According to Muslim reformist Tahir Aslam Gora, such prayers did not become a regular practice. The Canadian Islamic Congress said Raza's concerns were a "non-issue for Canadian Muslims".

=== Opposition to prayers in schools ===
Raza opposed congregational Muslim Friday prayers in public schools, saying that in 1988 the Ontario Court of Appeal ruled that the use of the Lord's Prayer in public schools was not appropriate. She said such prayers are contrary to the notion of separation of church and state. She called the prayers "discrimination and harassment" for requiring girls to pray at the back of the room and for disclosing their "private personal female condition".

=== Banning veils ===
Raza has argued for a public ban in Canada against the hijab and the burqa.

=== Opposition to Park51 Muslim community center ===
In August 2010 Raza, along with Tarek Fatah, both from the Muslim Canadian Congress, opposed the Muslim community center, Park51, located near the World Trade Center site (or Ground zero). She describes the project as a Fitna, meaning that it was done intentionally to provoke a reaction and make trouble.

In a Fox News interview with Bill O'Reilly she referred to Mayor Michael Bloomberg as having a "bleeding heart" for this cause that is actually dangerous for those who were affected by the 9/11 terror attacks, as the location of the Ground Zero Mosque seemed unnecessary and hurtful for the victims of the attacks.

=== On immigration ===
Raza has called the Canadian government to suspend all immigration from "terror-producing" countries, like Iran in 2012.

=== Organizations ===
Raza writes and records videos for the media websites Rebel News and True North Centre for Public Policy. She is a board member of and Director of Interfaith Affairs for the Muslim Canadian Congress.

She founded and is currently president of Forum for Learning, an interfaith discussion group. It is a non-profit organization.

In 2006, the National Muslim Christian Liaison Committee honoured her for promoting Muslim-Christian dialogue in the wake of the Pope Benedict controversy.

=== Donald Trump ===
Raza stated in an interview with Bill Maher that Donald Trump was "an equal opportunity offender. And, secondly, this is supposed to be the First World, the civilized world, but he is really fudging that line about civility.". In a later article for USA Today, Raza wrote that "as politically incorrect as his language may be," Trump had "succeeded in sparking an international conversation about radical Islam that we must have now", and called for Trump to "step up and put moderate Muslims on stage."

== Writing ==
Raza is a freelance writer. In 2000, she received an award from the Canadian Ethnic Journalists and Writers Club. She has lectured at York University on the portrayal of Muslims in the media.

Raza is the author of Their Jihad, Not My Jihad: a Muslim Canadian woman speaks out, a collection of her op-ed columns from the Toronto Star. She is also a poet and a playwright.

== Criticism ==
Raza has been criticized for her support and involvement in anti-Muslim groups and policies. After the 2014 Saint-Jean-sur-Richelieu ramming attack, she stated in her blog that there needs to be a suspension of Muslim immigrants to Canada and that all mosques should be closed for three months and claimed that this action would not be an abuse of religious freedom. Her support and association with groups and projects described as anti-Muslim like the Clarion Project and ACT! for America which have funded and aided anti-Muslim legislations and policies within the USA has also been criticized. She has been criticized as being "far from the "reformist" and "progressive" individual she claims to be, Raza's extensive history of anti-Muslim statements and open ties to hate groups make her fundamentally undemocratic."

== Works ==
=== Books ===
- How Can You Possibly be an Anti-Terrorist Muslim?, Raheel Raza, Possibly Publishing, 2011 ISBN 1-4609-2279-4
- Their Jihad... Not My Jihad: Revised 2nd Edition, Raheel Raza, Possibly Publishing, 2012 ISBN 0981943748
- How Can You Possibly be a Muslim Feminist?, Raheel Raza, Possibly Publishing, 2014 ISBN 0981943721
- The ABC's of Islamism: Everything you wanted to know about radical Islam, but were afraid to ask, Raheel Raza, Library and Archives Canada, 2020 ISBN 978-1777198626

=== Documentary film ===
Raza participated, together with eight other women's rights activists, in the documentary film Honor Diaries which explores the issues of gender-based violence and inequality in Muslim-majority societies. Her personal story was featured alongside those of the other activists, all of whom are working to combat gender prejudice that is embedded in honor-based societies.

=== Select articles ===
- Raza, Raheel (December 13, 2007). "Flavours of a desi Christmas; For Canada's South Asian Christians, Christmas is a festive time full of unique traditions – especially when it comes to food". Toronto Star. Archived from the original on December 15, 2007.
- "In the Arms of Extremists", Raheel Raza, Ottawa Citizen, December 28, 2007
- Riza, Raheel (March 19, 2008). "Steeped in superstition; When folklore, traditions and imagination intersect, the resulting beliefs are something even educated people take seriously". Toronto Star. Archived from the original on October 21, 2012.
- "'Islamophobia' used too often to stifle debate or criticism", Raheel Riza, The Vancouver Sun, June 17, 2008
- "Mischief in Manhattan; We Muslims know the Ground Zero mosque is meant to be a deliberate provocation", Raheel Raza and Tarek Fatah, Ottawa Citizen, August 7, 2010

== See also ==
- Criticism of Islamism
- Islamic feminism
- List of fatwas
