= Clarion Project =

American non-profit organization

- Founded: 2006
- Founder: Raphael Shore
- Tax ID no.: 20-5845679
- Location: Washington, D.C., US
- Website: clarionproject.org

The Clarion Project (formerly Clarion Fund Inc.) is an American nonprofit organization based in Washington, D.C. that was founded in 2006. The organization has been involved in the production and distribution of the films Obsession: Radical Islam's War Against the West, The Third Jihad: Radical Islam's Vision For America and Iranium. These films have been criticized by some for allegedly falsifying information and described as anti-Muslim propaganda. The organization publishes a weekly "Extremism Roundup" newsletter.

== Mission and leadership ==
Clarion Project states its mission is to expose and reduce the threats of extremism to create a safer world for all. The CEO as of 2022 is Richard Green. The project's advisory board included Raheel Raza president of Muslims Facing Tomorrow, Zuhdi Jasser president of the American Islamic Forum for Democracy (AIFD) and Michelle Baron. The project was founded by Raphael Shore.

== Criticism ==
The Southern Poverty Law Center listed the organization as an "anti-Muslim hate group" in 2016–2019. The U.S.-based Muslim advocacy group, the Council on American–Islamic Relations, stated that the Clarion Project is among 37 American organizations that promote Islamophobia in American society. The organization has been described as part of the counter-jihad movement.

Clarion previously employed security-analyst Ryan Mauro, who according to the Southern Poverty Law Center, has asserted that there were multiple "no-go zones" for non-Muslims across the U.K. and Europe and has spoken about the supposed rising number of Muslim enclaves across the U.S., governed by "gangs of Islamic extremists" enforcing the Shariah law.

In 2022 a speech by a Clarion Project co-founder was cancelled over protests that the Project is an anti-Muslim hate group.

== Films ==
- Obsession: Radical Islam's War Against the West (2005)
- The Third Jihad: Radical Islam's Vision For America (2008)
- Iranium (2011) - about Iran's nuclear weapons program
- Honor Diaries (2013) - about violence against women
- Faithkeepers (2017) - about Christians in the Middle East
- Kids: Chasing Paradise (2019) - about child soldiers
- Covert Cash (2020) - about foreign funding of US colleges
