= Chronon =

Hypothetical quantum of time

A chronon is a proposed quantum of time, that is, a discrete and indivisible unit of time as part of a hypothesis that proposes that time is not continuous. In simple language, a chronon is the smallest, discrete, non-decomposable unit of time.

In a one-dimensional model, a chronon is a duration or period, while in an n-dimensional model it is a non-decomposable region in n-dimensional time.

== Early work ==
While time is a continuous quantity in both standard quantum mechanics and general relativity, some physicists have suggested that a discrete model of time might work, especially when considering the combination of quantum mechanics with general relativity to produce a theory of quantum gravity.

The term was introduced in this sense by Robert Lévi in 1927.
