= American Islamic Forum for Democracy =

American Muslim think tank

American Islamic Forum for Democracy (AIFD) is an American Muslim think tank formed in 2003 by Zuhdi Jasser in Phoenix, Arizona.

AIFD advocates for the separation of religion and state and confronts the ideologies of political Islam and openly counters the belief that the Muslim faith is inextricably rooted to the concept of the Islamic state.

== Mission ==
AIFD's mission statement as found on their website, "is to advocate for the preservation of the founding principles of the United States Constitution, liberty and freedom, through the separation of mosque and state."

== Founder ==
AIFD was founded by Zuhdi Jasser in March 2003. A former Lieutenant Commander in the United States Navy, Jasser served 11 years as a medical officer. His tours of duty included Medical Department Head aboard the USS El Paso which deployed to Somalia during Operation Restore Hope; Chief Resident at Bethesda Naval Hospital; and Staff Internist for the Office of the Attending Physician to the United States Congress. He is a recipient of the Meritorious Service Medal.

Timothy R. Furnish said that Jasser's quest is to resurrect the doctrine of the Mu'tazilah, a group in early Islamic history which stated that reason was as important as revelation, and that the Qur'an was created rather than eternally existent and that humans had free will.
