= Iranium =

- Iranium Film Poster
- Directed by: Alex Traiman
- Written by: Clarion Project; Alex Traiman
- Produced by: Raphael Shore
- Narrated by: Shohreh Aghdashloo
- Edited by: Micah Smith
- Distributed by: Clarion Project
- Release date: February 8, 2011
- Running time: 60 minutes
- Country: United States
- Language: English

Iranium is a 2011 documentary film by director Alex Traiman, Written and Distributed by Clarion Project.

The film discusses Iranian foreign policy and Iran – United States relations, including the Iran hostage crisis and the 1979 Iranian Revolution and takeover by Ayatollah Khomeini.

The film premiered at select AMC theaters and community centers throughout the United States on February 8. The film has been criticized for misrepresenting and falsifying information in order to create a sense of urgency in the viewing public.

== Selected contributors ==
Notable contributors in the film include:

- Shelley Berkley – Democratic Member of the United States House of Representatives from Nevada
- Jon Kyl – United States Senator from Arizona [R]. Chairman and Ranking Member of the Senate Judiciary Committee's Subcommittee on Terrorism and Homeland Security
- Eliot Engel – Democratic U.S. Representative from the 17th Congressional district in New York. Member of the U.S. House Foreign Affairs Subcommittee.
- R. James Woolsey, Jr. – Former Director of Central Intelligence
- Clifford May – American journalist and President of the Foundation for Defense of Democracies
- Amir-Abbas Fakhravar - Iranian American writer, Student leader and former political prisoner. Research fellow and Visiting Lecturer at the Institute of World Politics
- Clare Lopez – A former Senior CIA Clandestine Operations Officer with tours in Africa, Central/South America and the Balkans, with a focus on the USSR/Russia.
- Frank Gaffney – American anti-Muslim conspiracy theorist and the founder and president of the Center for Security Policy.
- John Bolton – Former United States Ambassador to the United Nations
- Dore Gold – President of the Jerusalem Center for Public Affairs and former Israeli Ambassador to the United Nations
- Bernard Lewis – Professor Emeritus at Princeton University, one of America's foremost experts on the Middle East, and author of over 30 books on the Middle East and Islam.
- Ken Timmerman – American journalist, and the founder of the Foundation for Democracy in Iraq.
- Rabbi Arnold E. Resnicoff—Retired U.S. Navy Chaplain, offering eye-witness account of the 1983 Beirut barracks bombing

== Controversy ==
On February 8, 2011, the Iranian Foreign Ministry spokesman, Ramin Mehmanparast, denounced the film during a press conference in Tehran, calling it "...an attempt by Western countries to harm the progress of Iran's nuclear program." A January 18, 2011 screening of the film was then canceled by the Library and Archives of Canada (LAC), after the agency received further protests from the Iranian government, phone calls, and letters. The Iranian embassy had previously submitted a letter to the LAC, conveying their wish that the documentary not be shown due to concerns regarding the depiction of Iran's nuclear program and its perceived aims. The next day, Heritage Minister James Moore ordered that the film be shown and the screening was reinstated, scheduled to take place in February. According to Minister Moore, "The Iranian Embassy will not dictate to the Government of Canada which films will or will not be shown in Canada."

The film was subsequently shown in Ottawa on February 6 at the Library and Archives Canada, the same venue that canceled a showing of the film earlier after complaints by the Iranian Embassy. Following the affair at the LAC, film reviewer Jay Stone of the Vancouver Sun wrote: "It would be tempting to dismiss as a right-wing fantasy if only someone hadn't gone to such steps to keep it from being shown."

== Criticism ==
In an opinion piece for the Tehran Bureau on the PBS Frontline website, journalists Eli Clifton and Ali Gharib questioned the film's accuracy. The authors claim that "most of the analysts interviewed in the film are drawn from two neoconservative Washington think tanks...", the Center for Security Policy and Foundation for Defense of Democracies. The authors of the article claim that "Iran's leaders, despite a willingness to sacrifice citizens, have demonstrated that they are concerned primarily with themselves. Iran's use of a nuclear weapon would almost certainly imperil the regime's survival" and "while the film's justification for military action appears to hinge on Israel's willingness to launch a unilateral attack, recent comments from former Mossad chief Meir Dagan pushing back the Iranian nuclear clock may pose a challenge to the sense of urgency expressed by Clarion's experts and the narrative of imminent conflict crafted by the film's producers." Similarly, the Iranian Student Alliance in America (ISAA) at the University of California, Berkeley condemned the film, saying that "Iranium falsifies, exaggerates and overtly generalizes reality to manipulate the public’s emotions. Through such actions, the makers of Iranium instill fear within their viewers to justify their war agenda. Worst of all, they ruthlessly use the sacrifices of the people of Iran to push for a war that will target the same people."
