= OpenDor Media =

Israeli non-profit organization

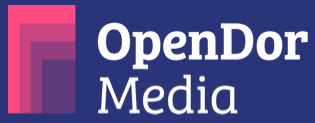
- Type: Nonprofit organization
- Founded: 2007
- Founder: Raphael Shore
- Headquarters: United States
- Key people: Andrew Savage, Noam Weissman
- Revenue: 8,159,293 United States dollar (2022)
- Total assets: 10,386,991 United States dollar (2022)
- Website: opendormedia.org

OpenDor Media, formerly Jerusalem U, is an Israeli non-profit organization founded in 2009 by Canadian-Israeli Raphael Shore that produces feature-length films, short videos, and social media content about Israel, Zionism, and Judaism.

The organization says its mission is to increase support for Israel and Zionism among the Jewish diaspora and "explore [Zionism's] complex history and achievements so that young people will recognize that Zionism is a story that every Jewish person can proudly embrace and cherish."

OpenDor Media houses four brands: Unpacked, Unpacked for Educators, ConnectED, and Amplified.

== History ==
Imagination Productions, Inc., which operates under OpenDor Media (formerly Jerusalem U), is a US-registered 501(c)(3) nonprofit organization. Founded in 2007, they have offices in Jerusalem, New York and Philadelphia. The organization is headed by founder and Executive Chairman Raphael Shore, CEO Andrew Savage, and EVP Noam Weissman. Former leadership includes president, Amy Holtz and Executive Vice President Eli Ovits.

Founder Raphael Shore, studied film at the University of Toronto. Shore produced the film Israel Inside: How a Small Nation Makes a Big Difference, the 2010 documentary Crossing the Line: The Intifada Comes to Campus, and Beneath the Helmet: From High School to the Home Front.

As Jerusalem U, OpenDor Media produced five film mini-series: Israel Inside/Out, Habits of Happiness: Positive Psychology & Judaism, Judaism 101, Cinema: The Jewish Lens and The Israel Course. They also created JU Max, which was a ten-week interactive, online course for college students.

== Creations ==
=== Unpacked ===
Unpacked is a division of OpenDor Media that publishes articles, social media posts, videos, and podcasts on a variety of platforms related to Israel and Zionism.

=== Unpacked for Educators ===
Unpacked for Educators is a website that promotes content created by Unpacked among educators and includes resources and materials. OpenDor Media consulted Rosov Consulting in 2020 to research the effect of their media on audiences.

=== ConnectED ===
ConnectED is a platform created by OpenDor Media to promote its views among educators, students, and parents in high schools and middle schools.

=== Amplified ===
Amplified is a content creation platform created by OpenDor Media that aims to promote content creators who share the organization's views. According to its website, "Amplified is a program that is designed to help content creators from around the world, who are aligned with OpenDor Media’s mission, grow audiences, increase impact and amplify their success, all within a community of similarly impassioned creators."

== Films ==
OpenDor Media has produced multiple feature-length films, including Israel Inside: How a Small Nation Makes a Big Difference and Crossing the Line: The Intifada Comes to Campus. Israel Inside was shown on PBS, college campuses, and El Al flights.

- Israel Inside: How a Small Nation Makes a Big Difference is a 55-minute film that aims to present the positive aspects of Israeli society. The film was released in 2011 and is narrated by former Harvard professor of Positive Psychology, Dr. Tal Ben-Shahar.
- Beneath the Helmet: From High School to the Home Front is a 2014 film which documents five Israeli high school graduates who are recruited to serve in the army paratrooper brigade for their compulsory military service. Beneath the Helmet was named the 5th Best Military Documentary on Netflix Streaming in 2015.
- Crossing the Line: The Intifada Comes to Campus is a commentary on pro-Palestinian protests on North American university campuses following the Israeli military assault on Gaza in December 2008 and January 2009. It interviews college students who support the State of Israel and who claim widespread anti-Semitism among protesters. Versions of the film have been made both for the United States and the United Kingdom. A follow-up documentary was released by Jerusalem U in 2015 called Crossing the Line 2: The New Face of Anti-Semitism on Campus.
- Hummus! The Movie is a documentary released in 2015 following three chefs in Israel who make hummus: a religious Jewish man, a Christian Arab man and a Muslim Arab woman. It won best movie presenting modern Jewish life and culture, at Jewish Motifs International Film Festival in Warsaw, Poland in 2017.
- Mekonen: The Journey of an African Jew tells the story of Mekonen Abebe who was born and raised in rural Ethiopia and later became a commander in the Israeli Defense Forces. He was previous featured in Beneath the Helmet.
- Sustainable Nation discusses sustainable water solutions developed in Israel and shared with other countries.
- Exodus 91 tells the story of Asher Naim who negotiated the release of 15,000 Ethiopian Jews during the 1991 civil war.
- Unsafe Space explores Jewish identity on college campuses and profiles a diverse group of students from various universities.
- Tragic Awakening: A New Look at the Oldest Hatred is a film directed by founder of OpenDor Media Raphael Shore that documents the history of antisemitism and presents the perspective of Syrian-born Arab Zionist Rawan Osman.
