= National Jewish Television =

National Jewish Television is a three-hour Jewish television block shown Sundays on religious and public-access television cable TV channels in the United States. National Jewish Television was founded in 1979 by Joel Levitch.

== History ==
National Jewish Television was founded in 1979.

By 1984 NJT was being broadcast to 175 cable channels weekly.

== Programming ==
- The Phil Blazer Show—explains Jewish life in Los Angeles and abroad with Phil Blazer serving as host.
- Hineni (started 1982)—a half-hour program featuring Rebbitzen Esther Jungreis reading from a book in the Torah and emphasizing the portion.
- The Leon Charney Report—an hour-long show featuring Leon Charney discussing politics and other current issues with many guests, mostly from New York City.
- L'Chayim, with Rabbi Mark S. Golub interviewing various Jewish personalities and their ideologies.
- A Cable to Jewish Life, with Rabbi Josef Katzman interviewing many Orthodox Jewish guests, including Avraham Fried, and their connection with Chabad.

=== Former shows ===
- Jerusalem on Line with Michael Greenspan, talking about the happenings in Jerusalem. (Ended in 2002)
- Jewish Spectrums which interviews various Jews and their accomplishments (Ended in 1995).
- RTN, otherwise known as Russian Television Network, featuring an hour-long program for Russian immigrants. (Ended in 1998).
- Talkline's Jewish Music Countdown' features various Jewish musicians and their music videos.
