= L'Chayim =

American Jewish talk show

L'Chayim (literally translated to To Life) was an American Jewish talk show shown every Sunday on National Jewish Television. It was produced by the independent non-profit organization, Jewish Education in Media (JEM).

== Background ==
L'Chayim premiered on WMCA Radio in New York City on February 2, 1979. Produced and hosted by JEM's executive director, Rabbi Mark S. Golub, L'Chayim features issues, people and events of importance to Jews. L'Chayim was one of the first Jewish programs to adopt a contemporary talk format and has always featured guests from a variety of Jewish movements, reflecting JEM's pluralistic approach to modern Jewish life.

In the early 1980s, L'Chayim was sponsored in Jewish communities by local Jewish federations. L'Chayim moved from WMCA to WOR Radio in New York City in the mid-1980s.

In 1990, L'Chayim premiered on television where it continues to air until Golub's death in 2023.

L'Chayim is part of the Jewish Broadcasting Service.

L'Chayim interviews have been transcribed for print in Anglo-Jewish papers, and an interview with Isaac Bashevis Singer is included in an anthology published by SUNY Press.
