= Unpacked =

Unpacked may refer to:

- Unpacked BCD, a specific binary encoding of decimals
- Unpacked by Flybuys, a song
- Unpacked, a website focused on Jewish and Israeli issues
- Galaxy Unpacked, a bi-annual consumer electronics event held by Samsung Electronics

== See also ==
- Unpacking
