= Russian Television Network of America =

American cable TV channel

The Russian Television Network of America (RTN) is an American Russian-language cable TV network targeting Russian-speaking immigrants in the United States, owned by Russian Media Group.

It was established in 1992 in Brooklyn, since its inception, it has used the faux callsign WMNB. The channel has been under the ownership of Mark Golub since the beginning, one of its first presenters being Aleksandr Gordon. The channel was sold in 1997. By 1999, there were accusations that some of the ORT news programs were anti-American and anti-Semitic. It broadcast Vremya live at 2pm, later repeated at midnight. In 2000, Golub regained his control on RTN/WMNB, buying it from its creditors. Its broadcasting partner became the RTR network. Golub's return implied the rebuilding of the historic WMNB, which had collapsed in 1999. From November 2000 to February 2001, it had amassed 12,000 subscribers. Golub, a Russian Jew, left RTN in 2005 to create Shalom TV, now the Jewish Broadcasting Service.

In 2003, it announced that it would upgrade its digital package to include two further channels, Russian World, an entertainment channel, and a relay of the newly launched RTR-Planeta. Russian World was produced by another company, but distributed by Russian Media Group.

By the late 2010s, the channel has become openly anti-Putin, airing locally made talk shows critical of the Russian government. Ari Kagan, presenter of talk show U nas v Amerike, has used the Statue of Liberty on the background of his program since 2000 as a symbol of freedom, which is heavily repressed in Russia. Its parent company Russian Media Group has been declared bankrupt in July 2021.
