= Shalom TV =

Shalom TV may refer to:

- Jewish Broadcasting Service, a non-profit national Jewish television network
- Shalom (TV channel), an Indian Malayalam Christian television channel
