= Wendy Sachs =

American filmmaker and author

Wendy Sachs is an American political filmmaker and author who is known for her books Fearless and Free and How She Really Does It, and for directing Surge (2020) and October 8 – The Fight for the Soul of America (October 8) (2025).

== Career ==
Sachs obtained her B.A. in journalism from Northwestern University. She worked as a Capitol Hill press secretary after college. While working as an associate producer at Dateline NBC, Sachs was mentored by Soraya Gage, whose part-time schedule was "revolutionary in the late 90s/early 2000s" for a senior producer. For her book How She Really Does It, Sachs interviewed over 100 women about balancing career and motherhood. She found that employers' flexibility towards working mothers' schedules was typically rewarded with the employees' loyalty. She noted the importance of reliable child care, a supportive spouse, and an ability to let go of perfectionism. The book's title was inspired by Allison Pearson's novel I Don't Know How She Does It.

Sachs's book Fearless and Free: How Smart Women Pivot and Relaunch Their Careers discussed "failing fast and learning from your failures". In order to bounce back from career setbacks and re-invent themselves, Sachs advised women to network, use any volunteer experience as a strength, and develop their brand. She stressed the importance of confidence, which may require a fake-it-till-you-make-it approach. Her own job loss and change in career direction after age 40 inspired her to write the book.

Her 2020 film Surge followed the campaigns of three female Congressional candidates, from Texas, Illinois, and Indiana. Of the three, Lauren Underwood won, becoming the youngest Black woman elected to Congress. The film was "literally shot through a female lens", using only female cinematographers. Sachs documented women attempting to flip Republican-held seats to Democratic seats in the 2018 elections. Her motivation to make the film began after her profound dismay at the 2016 presidential election results, when Sachs joined women's protests, and then was intrigued when numerous women declared they were running for political office.

Her 2025 film October 8 – The Fight for the Soul of America (October 8) was inspired by her reaction to campus protests after the October 7 Hamas-led attacks on Israel, and after she saw Hamas being celebrated as freedom fighters rather than condemned as terrorists in New York's Times Square on October 8, 2023. Sachs was surprised at the response of her fellow progressives to the attacks, including feminists who seemed to endorse "Me Too Unless You're a Jew." Co-produced with Debra Messing, the film includes interviews with Michael Rapaport, Noa Tishby, U.S. Representative Ritchie Torres, U.S. Sen. Kirsten Gillibrand, Sheryl Sandberg, Dan Senor, Scott Galloway, and Mosab Yousef. Sachs explored how Students for Justice in Palestine was organized, in order to understand how it was promoting anti-Zionism, and how she claimed it was promoting antisemitism on campus. The film also covers the role of social media in stoking antisemitism among young people.

== Works ==
- Surge (2020 documentary)
- Fearless and Free: How Smart Women Pivot and Relaunch Their Careers (AMACOM, 2017) ISBN 978-0814437698
- How She Really Does It: The Secrets of Successful Stay-at-Work Moms (Da Capo Press, 2005) ISBN 978-0738210629
- October 8– The Fight for the Soul of America (October 8) (2025 documentary)

== Awards ==
- Forbes' Forty over 40, 2017
