= Raphael Shore =

Canadian-Israeli film writer and producer (born 1961)

- רפאל שור
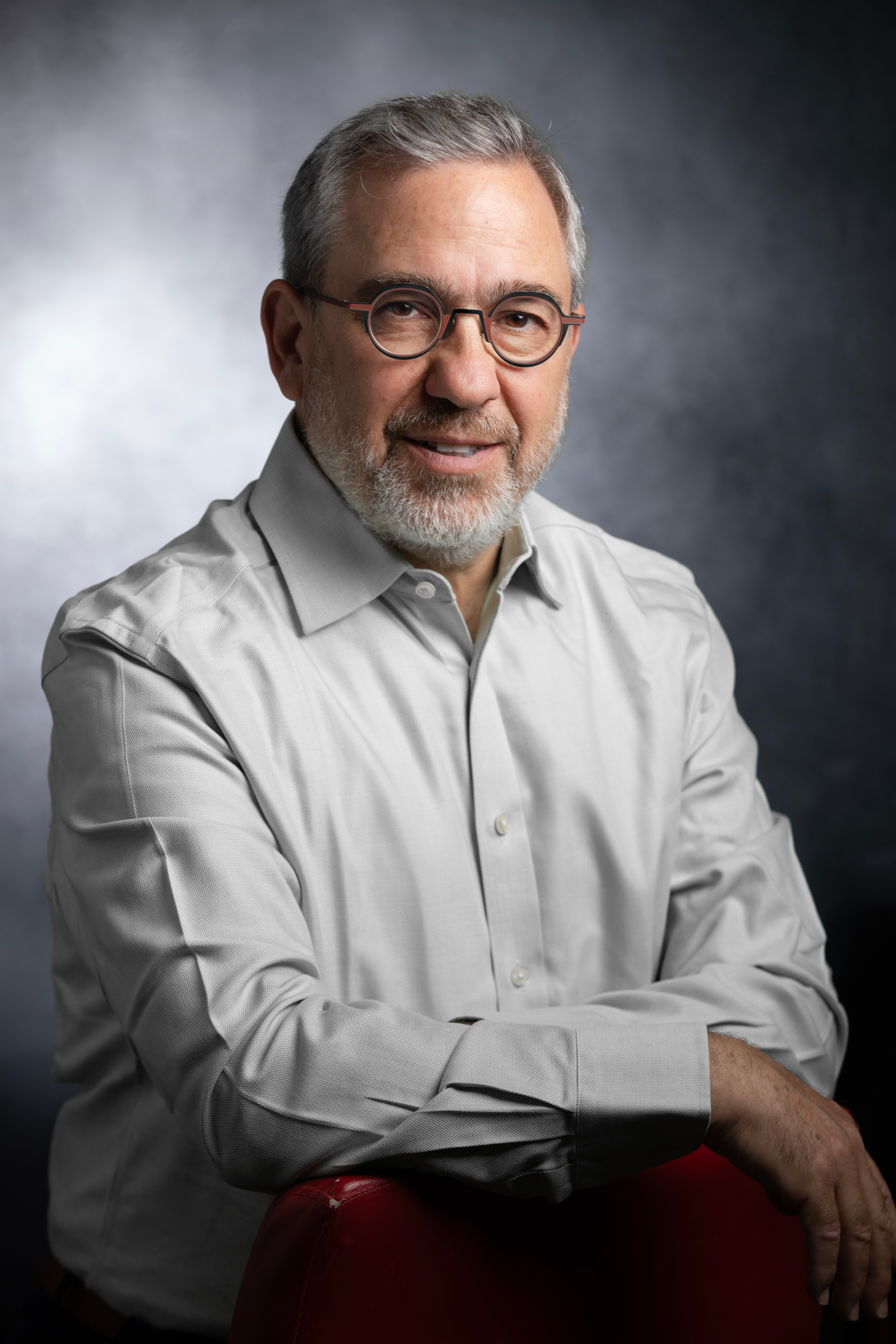
- Born: 1961
- Education: University of Toronto (BA)
- Occupations: Film writer; producer; author; rabbi
- Organizations: OpenDor Media; Clarion Project
- Spouse: Rebecca Shore
- Relatives: David Shore (brother); Marvin Shore (father)

Raphael Shore (Hebrew: רפאל שור; born 1961) is a Canadian-Israeli film writer, producer, author and rabbi. He is the founder of OpenDor Media, a Jewish educational organization, and Clarion Project, a nonprofit organization "dedicated to educating the public about the threats of Islamist extremism and providing a platform for moderate Muslim voices."

== Early life and education ==
Shore is the twin brother of Ephraim Shore, the former head of HonestReporting, rabbi, and tour guide, and younger brother of television producer and writer David Shore. He is the son of politician Marvin Shore. Shore has a Bachelor of Arts from the University of Toronto, Ontario.

== Career ==
Shore previously worked for Aish HaTorah, an Orthodox organization devoted to promoting Jewish learning, and has collaborated with HonestReporting, a pro-Israel media watchdog site formerly run by his brother Ephraim. He founded the Clarion Project in 2006, a counter-jihad organization involved in the production and distribution of documentary films.

=== OpenDor Media ===
Shore founded OpenDor Media in 2009 (formerly Jerusalem U), a non-profit organization dedicated to film-based Jewish and Israel education. OpenDor Media produces feature-length films, short videos, social media content and educational resources.

=== Film producer ===
Shore wrote, directed and produced Relentless: The Struggle for Peace in the Middle East in 2003. This film explores the cause of the Second Intifada through an examination of compliance with the Declaration of Principles, otherwise known as the Oslo Accords. It is based on a PowerPoint presentation that Shore used as a study aid when he was teaching a political science course in Israel.

His 2008 documentary, Obsession: Radical Islam's War Against the West, was distributed to 28 million voters throughout the United States during the 2008 United States presidential campaign. Shore has declined to reveal who funded both the production of the film or dissemination of the DVDs.

In 2010, Shore self-released the documentary film, Crossing the Line: The Intifada Comes to Campus.

He produced Iranium in 2011, a documentary film about the potential dangers of a nuclear Iran. A prelaunch screening scheduled to take place at the end of January at the Canadian National Archives in Ottawa drew opposition from the Iranian consulate. After a number of anonymous threats were received the National Archives canceled the screening citing security concerns. This cancellation received extensive coverage and it was eventually screened in Ottawa. In response, Shore said: “They basically gave us our advertising slogan: the film Iran's leaders do not want you to see”.

Shore produced the 2012 documentary Israel Inside: How a Small Nation Makes a Big Difference, narrated by Tal Ben-Shahar. The film explores parts of Israeli history and society that tend not to be addressed in mainstream coverage of the country.

In 2015, Shore released a sequel to Crossing the Line, Crossing the Line 2: The New Face of Anti-Semitism on Campus, that documents how a growing number of anti-Israel demonstrations on U.S. campuses also include anti-Semitic messaging. He also wrote and produced Hummus the Movie the same year, a documentary movie about hummus.

In 2022, Shore was the executive producer of Unsafe Spaces, a documentary that features the voices of Jewish activists working to combat antisemitism and to create an inclusive community for everyone. It explores Jewish identity on college campuses and profiles a diverse group of students from various universities.

In 2024, Shore was the producer of Tragic Awakening – A New Look at the Oldest Hatred. The documentary explores the roots of antisemitism through the insights of Arab Zionist Rawan Osman.

=== Author ===
In 2024, Shore published Who's Afraid of the Big Bad Jew – Learning to Love the Lessons of Jew Hatred.

== Filmography ==
Year	Title	Role	Notes
2003	Relentless: The Struggle for Peace in the Middle East	Executive producer	
2005	Obsession: Radical Islam's War Against the West	Producer	
2008	The Third Jihad: Radical Islam's Vision For America	Producer	
2010	Crossing the Line: The Intifada Comes to Campus	Producer	
2011	Iranium	Producer	
2011	Israel Inside: How a Small Nation Makes a Big Difference	Executive producer	
2013	Honor Diaries	Executive producer	
2014	Beneath the Helmet	Executive producer	
2015	Crossing the Line 2: The New Face of Anti-Semitism on Campus	Producer	
2015	Hummus the Movie	Executive producer	
2016	Mekonen: The Journey of an African Jew	Executive producer	
2016	Faithkeepers	Executive producer	
2017	When the Smoke Clears: A Story of Brotherhood, Resilience and Hope	Executive producer	
2017	Kids: Chasing Paradise	Executive producer	
2018	Sustainable Nation	Executive producer	
2019	The Psychology of Terrorism	Executive producer	
2020	Covert Cash	Producer	
2020	Upheaval: The Journey of Menachem Begin	Co-producer	
2022	Converts the Movie	Executive producer	
2024	Tragic Awakening	Executive producer	
