= Marvin Shore =

Canadian politician (1929–2019)

Ontario MPP
- In office 1975–1977
- Preceded by: Gordon Walker
- Succeeded by: Ron Van Horne
- Constituency: London North

Personal details
- Born: April 13, 1929 Toronto, Ontario, Canada
- Died: September 27, 2019 (aged 90) Toronto, Ontario, Canada
- Party: Liberal / PC
- Children: 3, including David and Raphael

Marvin Leonard Shore (April 13, 1929 – September 27, 2019) was a Canadian politician. He represented London North in the Legislative Assembly of Ontario from 1975 to 1977, originally as a Liberal member.

Shore was born in Toronto, Ontario in 1929. He was of Jewish descent.

He was elected in the general election in 1975 as a Liberal member but crossed the floor on October 27, 1976, to join the minority PC government. In the subsequent general election, in 1977, Shore lost to Ron Van Horne, the Liberal candidate. He died at the age of 90 on September 27, 2019.

Shore has 3 sons; David Shore would go on to be a successful television writer while twins Ephraim and Raphael Shore became rabbis.
