= Crossing the Line 2: The New Face of Anti-Semitism on Campus =

- Directed by: Shoshana Palatnik
- Written by: Yitz Brilliant
- Produced by: Raphael Shore
- Edited by: Yitz Brilliant
- Release date: February 25, 2015
- Running time: 29 minutes
- Country: United States
- Language: English

Crossing the Line 2: The New Face of Anti-Semitism on Campus is a 2015 film which documents how a growing number of anti-Israel demonstrations on U.S. campuses also include antisemitic messaging. The filmmakers interviewed pro-Israel college students, both Jewish and non-Jewish, who say that they feel increasingly intimidated to express their support for Israel on campus.

== Synopsis ==
Crossing the Line 2: The New Face of Anti-Semitism on Campus is a documentary film that was released in New York on February 25, 2015 as a sequel to Jerusalem U’s 2010 feature film Crossing the Line: The Intifada Comes to Campus. Like the original film, Crossing the Line 2 aims to uncover the anti-Israel and antisemitic activity on North American college campuses and educate the viewer to be able to identify when valid criticism of Israel “crosses the line” into antisemitic rhetoric. Crossing the Line 2 covers more recent examples of this activism up to the year 2014. One such event, whose footage is shown in the film, is an anti-Israel demonstration at Cornell University where a demonstrator spits on a pro-Israel student and screams “fuck you Zionist scum.”

The documentary also examines the experiences of Jewish college students who openly support the State of Israel and fight against campaigns on their campuses that oppose or critique the Israeli government and its occupation of the Palestinian territories, such as the Boycott, Divestment and Sanctions campaign and Israel Apartheid Week. These students consistently describe the hostility they face on their campuses, such as fake eviction notices at New York University, and Israel Apartheid Week held on campuses across North America. The film highlights two students from Ohio University who were arrested in 2014 for publicly criticizing the student senate president for participating in the ALS Ice Bucket Challenge by pouring fake blood on herself and calling on Ohio University to divest from Israel.

== Featured experts ==
- Colonel Richard Kemp - Former Commander of British Forces in Afghanistan
- Professor Robert Wistrich - Director, Vidal Sassoon International Center for the Study of Anti-Semitism
- Roz Rothstein - Director, StandWithUs
- Aviva Slomich - Campus Director, Committee for Accuracy in Middle East Reporting in America (CAMERA)
- Elliot Matthias - Director, Hasbara Fellowships
- Professor Sharon Musher - Richard Stockton College

== Featured student activists ==
- Justin Hayet (Binghamton University) is a campus activist who has organized numerous pro-Israel events on his campus and written opinion pieces for the campus newspaper, The Jerusalem Post, and the CAMERAonCampus blog. Hayet received CAMERA’s 2015 David Bar Ilan Award for Outstanding Camus Activism.
- Sophia Wilkof (University of California) is an active member of Bruins for Israel at UCLA and is an assistant student organization liaison for cultural organizations on her campus.
- Rebecca Sebo (Ohio University) was the President of Bobcats for Israel on campus and Grinspoon Morningstar Fellow for the Israel on Campus Coalition. Sebo was arrested in 2014 for disrupting a student senate meeting in protest of a video released the previous week by the Ohio University Student Senate President Megan Marzec in support of the Boycott, Divestment, and Sanctions movement against Israel.
- Chloé Valdary (University of New Orleans) created Allies of Israel on her campus in 2012. She was named one of the top 100 people positively affecting Jewish and Israeli life in the Algemeiner’s inaugural celebration of this category. She has written articles for Huffington Post, Tablet Magazine, The Jerusalem Post, and Israel National News. Valdary is also a consultant for CAMERA, the assistant of directors for the Institute for Black Solidarity with Israel, and a Fellow at the Lawfare Project.
- Sarah Abonyi (University of New Mexico) was the founder and president of Lobos for Israel on her campus. She served as the Israel on Campus Coalition's Grinspoon-Morningstar Fellow and spearheaded efforts to defeat the Boycott, Divestment, and Sanctions movement on her campus. Abonyi received the Woman of Valor award in 2014 from the Jewish Federation of New Mexico and the Conflict Resolution award from the Graduate Professional Student Association of the University of Mexico for her achievements in Israel activism.
- Jackie Retig (New York University) – is a leader of TorchPac, NYU's pro-Israel student group. In 2014, she organized the Innovation Israel Convention for NYU's Stern School of Business. Retig is currently the Director of Academic Affairs at the Consulate General of Israel in NY.
- Zara Mellits (University of Michigan) is an active member of ILead, the pro-Israel organization on her campus.
- Gabe Sirkin (Ohio University) is the president of Bobcats for Israel on campus and Hillel's Peer Network Engagement Intern. Sirkin was arrested in 2014 for disrupting a student senate meeting in protest of a video released the previous week by the Ohio University Student Senate President Megan Marzec in support of the Boycott, Divestment, and Sanctions movement against Israel.

== Criticism ==
Sarah Turbow, Director of J Street wrote that the film was missing students who believe that even among BDS supporters and strong critics of Israel, not all are antisemitic.

== Reception ==
Coverage of the film was reported in Jewish Voice, The San Diego Jewish World, and The Washington Times.

== See also ==
- Universities and antisemitism
  - Antisemitism and higher education in the United States
    - Antisemitism at Columbia University
      - Columbia Unbecoming controversy
    - 2023 United States Congress hearing on antisemitism
