= Upheaval: The Journey of Menachem Begin =

- Film Poster
- Directed by: Jonathan Gruber
- Written by: Jonathan Gruber
- Produced by: Jonathan Gruber; Rachel Greenberg; Gi Orman; Bruce K. Gould; Barry Gurland; Monica Gurland; Iris Maidenbaum; Shalom Maidenbaum; Alan Meltzer; Amy Meltzer; Raphael Shore; Micah Smith
- Cinematography: Shane Michael Colella
- Edited by: John Ayala
- Music by: Charlie Barnett
- Production companies: Hidden Light Institute; Imagination Productions; Begin Documentary Film, LLC
- Distributed by: Abramorama
- Release dates: October 8, 2020 (Heartland Film Festival); June 9, 2021 (wider release)
- Running time: 87 minutes
- Country: United States
- Language: English

Upheaval: The Journey of Menachem Begin is a 2020 American documentary film written and directed by Jonathan Gruber. The film chronicles the life and achievements of former Prime Minister of Israel, Menachem Begin, whether popular or controversial. This film features archival footage as well as interviews from dozens of people, some of whom knew Begin personally, while others have studied his impact on Israeli society and the greater Middle East.

== Release ==
The film was first released at the Heartland Film Festival on October 8, 2020. It had a live worldwide premiere on Facebook Live on June 7, 2021, before becoming available through the film's official website. As of January 9, 2023, the film has been released on 550 screens in 48 states, 8 countries, and across 20 film festivals.
