= Jonathan Gruber (filmmaker) =

Jonathan Gruber is an American director of documentary films, commercials, and videos. He is Jewish.

Projects that Gruber directed and produced have screened at festivals and in theaters nationwide and around the world, and have aired on PBS, The History Channel, National Geographic, Discovery Networks, and more.

His film, Follow Me: The Yoni Netanyahu Story, was an in depth look into the private life of the man who became the hero and pivotal strategist in the Israeli rescue of the Israeli hostages from Entebbe, Uganda following the hijacking of an Air France plane by Palestinian militants, which Idi Amin permitted to land in his country. After the Jewish and Israeli passengers were separated and threatened, the Israeli government quickly devised Operation Entebbe, which ended with the rescue of the passengers, but the death of Netanyahu. The film won awards at several national film festivals.

Gruber also directed a film about the American Civil War, Jewish Soldiers in Blue & Gray, and two other notable films. Jonathan currently has one film in development, another in pre-production, and runs a successful film and video production company, Black Eye Productions, which is hired for corporate, PSA, and non-profit work. He was a co-creator and director on the 2018 MSNBC series, The Story of Cool.

Filmography

- Jewish Soldiers in Blue & Gray (2011)
- Follow Me: The Yoni Netanyahu Story (2012)
- Upheaval: The Journey of Menachem Begin (2021)

== Other Resources ==
- Successful Kickstarter Campaign for Deal with the Devil
- Gruber's IMDB
- Jonathan Gruber's Website
