= London North (provincial electoral district) =

Former provincial electoral district in Ontario, Canada

Ontario electoral district

Defunct provincial electoral district
- Legislature: Legislative Assembly of Ontario
- District created: 1926
- District abolished: 1996
- First contested: 1926
- Last contested: 1995

London North was a provincial electoral district in Ontario, Canada. It was first created for the 1926 provincial election when the London riding was divided in two sections, and then eliminated prior to the 1934 provincial election when the city was re-configured as a single seat. London North was re-established for the 1955 provincial election and retained until 1999, when most of its territory was integrated into the new riding of London North Centre.

The riding was Progressive Conservative bastion for most of its history, and was represented by both Premier John Robarts and cabinet minister Gordon Walker at different times. Marvin Shore won the riding as a Liberal in 1975, and crossed the floor to the Progressive Conservatives the following year. Liberal Ronald Van Horne won it back for his party in 1977, and held it until his retirement in 1988. Progressive Conservative Dianne Cunningham was its final representative.

== Members of Provincial Parliament ==
London North
Assembly	Years	Member	Party
17th	1926–1929	James Moore	Progressive Conservative
18th	1929–1934	James Moore	Progressive Conservative
Merged with London South into London from 1934 to 1955
25th	1955–1959	John Robarts	Progressive Conservative
26th	1959–1963	John Robarts	Progressive Conservative
27th	1963–1967	John Robarts	Progressive Conservative
28th	1967–1971	John Robarts	Progressive Conservative
29th	1971–1975	Gordon Walker	Progressive Conservative
30th	1975–1976	Marvin Shore	Liberal
30th	1976–1977	Marvin Shore	Progressive Conservative
31st	1977–1981	Ronald Van Horne	Liberal
32nd	1981–1985	Ronald Van Horne	Liberal
33rd	1985–1987	Ronald Van Horne	Liberal
34th	1987–1988	Ronald Van Horne	Liberal
34th	1988–1990	Dianne Cunningham	Progressive Conservative
35th	1990–1995	Dianne Cunningham	Progressive Conservative
36th	1995–1999	Dianne Cunningham	Progressive Conservative
Sourced from the Ontario Legislative Assembly
Merged into London North Centre before the 1999 election

== Electoral history ==
1995 Ontario general election
Party	Candidate	Votes	%	±%
Progressive Conservative	Dianne Cunningham	23,195	52.65	+11.35
Liberal	Larry Crossan	11,112	25.23	+2.40
New Democratic	Carolyn Davies	8,167	18.54	–13.46
Family Coalition	Graeme Benedetti	777	1.76	–0.74
Green	John Beverley	365	0.83	–
Freedom	Jack Plant	334	0.76	–0.61
Natural Law	Rita Varrin	101	0.23	–
Total valid votes		44,051	99.09	
Total rejected, unmarked and declined ballots		404	0.91	–0.34
Turnout		44,455	64.73	–3.07
Eligible voters		68,675		
Progressive Conservative hold		Swing		+4.47
Source: Elections Ontario

1990 Ontario general election
Party	Candidate	Votes	%	±%
Progressive Conservative	Dianne Cunningham	18,079	41.30	–0.90
New Democratic	Carolyn Davies	14,005	32.00	+11.29
Liberal	Steve R. Buchanan	9,990	22.82	–8.75
Family Coalition	Bob Maniuk	1,095	2.50	–1.00
Freedom	Jack Plant	601	1.37	–0.30
Total valid votes		43,770	98.75	
Total rejected, unmarked and declined ballots		553	1.25	+0.94
Turnout		44,323	67.80	+19.76
Eligible voters		65,373		
Progressive Conservative hold		Swing		–6.10
Source: Elections Ontario

Ontario provincial by-election, March 31, 1988 Resignation of Ron Van Horne
Party	Candidate	Votes	%	±%
Progressive Conservative	Dianne Cunningham	13,858	42.20	+23.68
Liberal	Muriel Pensa	10,366	31.57	–26.39
New Democratic	Diane Whiteside	6,799	20.71	+0.16
Family Coalition	Brenda Rowe	1,149	3.50	+1.92
Freedom	Barry Malcolm	548	1.67	+0.28
Independent	John Turmel	115	0.35	–
Total valid votes		32,835	99.69	
Total rejected ballots		101	0.31	–0.05
Turnout		32,936	48.04	–15.66
Eligible voters		68,565		
Progressive Conservative gain from Liberal		Swing		+11.76
Source: Elections Ontario

1987 Ontario general election
Party	Candidate	Votes	%	±%
Liberal	Ron Van Horne	22,452	57.96	+3.52
New Democratic	Diane Whiteside	7,961	20.55	+6.79
Progressive Conservative	Lucky J. Clark	7,177	18.53	–11.78
Family Coalition	Elvis Mizzau	611	1.58	–
Freedom	Barry Malcolm	537	1.39	–0.11
Total valid votes		38,738	99.64	
Total rejected ballots		139	0.36	–0.06
Turnout		38,877	63.70	+3.63
Eligible voters		61,034		
Liberal hold		Swing		–1.63
Source: Elections Ontario

1985 Ontario general election
Party	Candidate	Votes	%	±%
Liberal	Ron Van Horne	20,536	54.43	+4.83
Progressive Conservative	George Auola	11,433	30.31	–7.68
New Democratic	Marion Boyd	5,191	13.76	+1.35
Freedom	Robert Smeenk	566	1.50	–
Total valid votes		37,726	99.58	
Total rejected ballots		160	0.42	+0.11
Turnout		37,886	60.07	+5.98
Eligible voters		63,071		
Liberal hold		Swing		+6.25
Source: Elections Ontario

1981 Ontario general election
Party	Candidate	Votes	%	±%
Liberal	Ron Van Horne	15,444	49.61	+2.62
Progressive Conservative	Ted Browne	11,825	37.98	+4.76
New Democratic	Sam Saumur	3,864	12.41	–6.75
Total valid votes		31,133	99.69	
Total rejected ballots		97	0.31	–0.06
Turnout		31,230	54.09	–11.96
Eligible voters		57,739		
Liberal hold		Swing		–1.07
Source: Elections Ontario

1977 Ontario general election
Party	Candidate	Votes	%	±%
Liberal	Ron Van Horne	15,033	46.99	+2.33
Progressive Conservative	Marvin Shore	10,631	33.23	–3.98
New Democratic	David N. Cunningham	6,130	19.16	+1.02
Libertarian	Greg R. Utas	201	0.63	–
Total valid votes		31,995	99.63	
Total rejected ballots		118	0.37	+0.12
Turnout		32,113	66.05	–0.61
Eligible voters		48,617		
Liberal hold		Swing		+3.16
Source: Elections Ontario

1975 Ontario general election
Party	Candidate	Votes	%	±%
Liberal	Marvin Shore	13,689	44.65	+17.48
Progressive Conservative	Gordon Walker	11,407	37.21	–4.69
New Democratic	Mike Warren	5,560	18.14	–10.60
Total valid votes		30,656	99.75	
Total rejected ballots		77	0.25	–0.05
Turnout		30,733	66.66	–6.43
Eligible voters		46,103		
Liberal gain from Progressive Conservative		Swing		+14.04
Source: Elections Ontario

1971 Ontario general election
Party	Candidate	Votes	%	±%
Progressive Conservative	Gordon Walker	17,266	41.90	–7.24
New Democratic	Charles Bigelow	11,840	28.73	+11.62
Liberal	Charles F. Ross	11,198	27.18	–6.57
Independent	Robert James Paton	902	2.19	–
Total valid votes		41,206	99.70	
Total rejected ballots		124	0.30	–0.33
Turnout		41,330	73.09	+16.23
Eligible voters		56,545		
Progressive Conservative hold		Swing		–9.43
Source: Elections Ontario

1967 Ontario general election
Party	Candidate	Votes	%	±%
Progressive Conservative	John Robarts	13,087	49.14	–19.48
Liberal	Frank Carter	8,987	33.74	+10.46
New Democratic	Bob Abrahams	4,559	17.12	+9.01
Total valid votes		26,633	99.37	
Total rejected ballots		169	0.63	–0.25
Turnout		26,802	56.86	–0.71
Eligible voters		47,134		
Progressive Conservative hold		Swing		–14.97
Source: Elections Ontario

1963 Ontario general election
Party	Candidate	Votes	%	±%
Progressive Conservative	John Robarts	12,531	68.61	+13.64
Liberal	Campbell Calder	4,252	23.28	–12.15
New Democratic	Clayton Fee	1,480	8.10	–1.49
Total valid votes		18,263	99.12	
Total rejected ballots		163	0.88	+0.05
Turnout		18,426	57.57	+3.29
Eligible voters		32,005		
Progressive Conservative hold		Swing		+12.90
Source: Elections Ontario

1959 Ontario general election
Party	Candidate	Votes	%	±%
Progressive Conservative	John Robarts	9,253	54.97	+7.27
Liberal	Joseph Beechie	5,965	35.44	–3.55
Co-operative Commonwealth	W. G. Flood	1,615	9.59	–3.72
Total valid votes		16,833	99.17	
Total rejected ballots		141	0.83	+0.15
Turnout		16,974	54.28	–6.93
Eligible voters		31,271		
Progressive Conservative hold		Swing		+5.41
Source: Elections Ontario

1955 Ontario general election
Party	Candidate	Votes	%
Progressive Conservative	John Robarts	9,022	47.70
Liberal	Clarence M. Peterson	7,374	38.99
Co-operative Commonwealth	Walter Crumplin	2,518	13.31
Total valid votes		18,914	99.32
Total rejected ballots		129	0.68
Turnout		19,043	61.21
Eligible voters		31,110	
Progressive Conservative pickup new district.			
Source: Elections Ontario

=== 1926–1934 ===
1929 Ontario general election
Party	Candidate	Votes	%	±%
Conservative	James Percy Moore	6,221	68.04	+6.21
Prohibitionist	William Thomas Mossop	2,922	31.96	–6.21
Total valid votes		9,143	99.50	
Total rejected ballots		46	0.50	–0.04
Turnout		9,189	47.12	–13.43
Eligible voters		19,503		
Conservative hold		Swing		+6.21
Source: Elections Ontario

1926 Ontario general election
Party	Candidate	Votes	%
Conservative	James Percy Moore	7,763	61.83
Prohibitionist	Wilbur Nelson Manning	4,793	38.17
Total valid votes		12,556	99.46
Total rejected ballots		68	0.54
Turnout		12,624	60.55
Eligible voters		20,850	
Conservative pickup new district.			
Source: Elections Ontario

== See also ==
- List of Ontario provincial electoral districts
- Canadian provincial electoral districts
