= Blind Spot (2024 film) =

2024 American documentary film

- Poster
- Directed by: Seth Kramer, Jeremy Newberger, Daniel A. Miller
- Country of origin: United States
- Original language: English

Production
- Executive producer: Leonard Gold
- Running time: 95 minutes
- Production company: Ironbound Films

Original release
- Network: Jewish Broadcasting Service and StandWithUs
- Release: March 30, 2025

Blind Spot is a 2024 American documentary film about campus antisemitism in the United States, prior to and following the October 7 attacks.

== Synopsis ==
In the film, over two dozen US college students describe the rise of antisemitism on their campuses. Prominently featured are CUNY, Tulane, George Washington University, Columbia, the University of Vermont and the University of California, Berkeley. Jewish leaders from campus and community organizations are interviewed, as are Representatives Ritchie Torres and Josh Gottheimer, and authors Dara Horn and Noa Tishby.

== Production ==
Executive producer Leonard Gold was first inspired to make the film 15 years earlier when he observed antisemitism as the father of a private school student in Manhattan. When antisemitism escalated on college campuses before and after the October 7 attacks, Gold perceived a "serious modern-day American civil rights problem".

The soundtrack includes music from Louis Armstrong, Billie Holiday, Dr, Seuss, Israeli artists Eden Golan and Yuval Salomon, Israeli cantors Naftali Hershtik and his son Netanel Hershtik, pianist Lee Musiker, and clarinetist Nat Gold.

Gloria Zimmerman was Blind Spot’s Co-Producer.

== Critical reception ==
The film premiered in 2024 at the Museum of Jewish Heritage in New York and has been shown at the Boca International Jewish Film Festival, other film festivals JCC's, schools, synagogues, movie theaters and museums.

Fern Sidman called the film "an indictment, an inspiration, and above all, a mirror held up to a society". She noted the film's focus on social pressures on Jewish students to renounce their connection to Israel, calling this "a modern form of antisemitism cloaked in the language of social justice". Douglas Altabef called the film "a fire alarm ringing and a profile of many of the firefighters trying to deal with the flames". The Jerusalem Post called the film "yet another red alert about Jew-hatred in America", noting that it began with events in 2022, in contrast to other documentaries on the topic, which were made after the October 7 attacks.

The Algemeiner said that Blind Spot "draws attention to [the students'] bravery and courage in standing up against antisemitism, [but also] highlights the heartbreaking experiences these Jewish students endured,... [despite which they] are not portrayed as victims but as the heroes in their own stories."

== Awards ==
Blind Spot received the 2026 Award of Excellence from the Religion Communicators Council in the Audio-Visual > Full Length category.

== See also ==
- October 8
- Tragic Awakening
