= Unpacked (website) =

Israeli media outlet

- Company type: Media outlet
- Website type: News website, Educational website
- Founded: June 2019
- Headquarters: {{{location_country}}}
- Founder: Dina Rabhan (OpenDor Media)
- Website: jewishunpacked.com
- Current status: Active

Unpacked is a media wing of OpenDor Media, Israeli non-profit organization, founded in June 2019. Unpacked creates educational videos about Israel and Judaism. It produces content on various social media platforms like YouTube and its website. Since 2022, Unpacked received over 9 million views on YouTube, the organization claimed that 1,811 educational institutions used Unpacked's videos for study.

== History ==
Unpacked was founded sometime in June 2019, its launch was revealed after Dina Rabhan, CEO of Jerusalem U (now OpenDor Media), contacted the Jewish News Syndicate to announce its launch. She said Unpacked will first start on YouTube and upload educational videos that will cover history of Israel and Judaism. She said the channel's content aimed for young audience that ranged from 13 to 34 years, first video series of Unpacked were named The History of Israel Explained and had 55 episodes, each video lasted approximately 8 minutes. After the launch, Jerusalem U asked its audience to watch Unpacked's 10-minute video once a week, calling it "take 10 campaign". The videos of the channel were described by the organization as "bite-sized", saying they are going to answer complex questions about Jewish history. In June 2020, Unpacked launched new 42 episode-long series titled The Jewish Story Explained, each episode lasted about 10 minutes.

In January 2022, YouTube channel of Unpacked reached over 100,000 subscribers. OpenDor media said that the channel had risen in popularity since 2021 Israel–Palestine crisis, increasing its audience by 400%. In June 2022, Unpacked launched "Unpacked for Educators", a media initiative that produces videos for Israeli teachers and reports on controversial topics like Arab-Israeli conflict. In the same year, The Jewish Chronicle said that Unpacked held pro-Zionist views in its content. It also said that Unpacked started publishing weekly briefings about political events around Israel. In June 2024, Unpacked launched French language version of its YouTube channel named "On déballe!" (translated to "We Unpack!"). Unpacked initially used AI tools to translate its videos to French but later hired native French speakers as hosts of the channel. On April 9, 2025, Unpacked announced the launch of "Judaism Unpacked", Unpacked's educational platform for young Jews.

== Content ==
Unpacked produces content on various platforms, like YouTube, Instagram, and TikTok, it also makes podcasts and news articles. In 2023, Unpacked's view count on YouTube was estimated to be at 15.9 million. Its most popular podcast at that time was titled Unpacking Israeli History, it reportedly received over a million downloads and was ranked as "#1 trending Jewish podcast" on the platform. Unpacked for Educators initiative is responsible for creating educational content for teachers at schools, like lesson plans, future topics for study and further reading content for Unpacked's videos. Some videos of Unpacked are also featured in the initiative. OpenDor media said that 1,811 educational institutions used Unpacked's videos for study, Rosov Consulting said 14 schools partnered with OpenDor Media received access to videos of Unpacked.

Unpacked is said to release one video per week, its website is hosted at "jewishunpacked.com". Stats provided by OpenDor Media in 2024 said Unpacked has over 220,000 subscribers and 44 million views on YouTube, its podcasts were downloaded 1.5 million times. Gary Rosenblatt said Unpacked aims to attract young audiences who prefer to use TikTok or Instagram for information. He described narration in Unpacked's videos is fast-paced, he also said that images in the videos move so fast and that only teens are likely to absorb them. He described the content of Unpacked as "factual, balanced".
