= Ron Van Horne =

Canadian politician

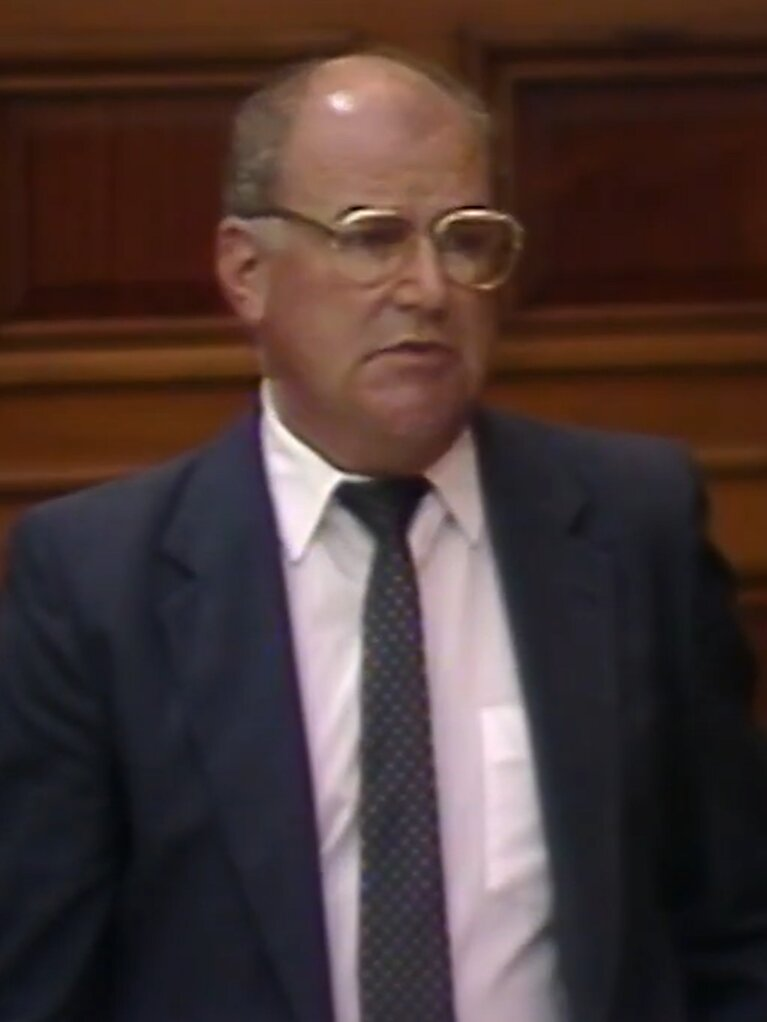
- Van Horne in 1986

Ontario MPP
- In office 1977–1988
- Preceded by: Marvin Shore
- Succeeded by: Dianne Cunningham
- Constituency: London North

Personal details
- Born: October 24, 1932 Goderich, Ontario
- Died: November 2, 2017 (aged 85) London, Ontario
- Party: Liberal
- Spouse: Mary Jane Moriarity (m. 1957)
- Children: 6
- Occupation: Teacher
- Cabinet: Minister without portfolio (1985–1987)

Ronald George Van Horne (October 24, 1932 – November 2, 2017) was a politician in Ontario, Canada. He served in the Legislative Assembly of Ontario as a Liberal from 1977 to 1987, and was a cabinet minister in the government of David Peterson.

== Background ==
Van Horne was educated at the University of Western Ontario, and worked as a teacher, school administrator and school superintendent. He was the Public Utilities Commissioner in London, Ontario from 1970 to 1976. Van Horne's son, also named Ronald, is a solicitor in Lambton County.

== Politics ==
He was elected to the Ontario legislature in the 1977 provincial election, defeating Progressive Conservative Marvin Shore by about 4,500 votes in the urban riding of London North. He was re-elected in the 1981 election by about the same margin. The Liberal Party served as Ontario's official opposition during this period.

Van Horne was re-elected by over 9,000 votes over his Progressive Conservative opponent in the 1985 provincial election (Marion Boyd of the NDP finished third). The Liberals formed a minority government following the election, and Van Horne was appointed as a minister without portfolio responsible for Senior Citizen's Issues on June 26, 1985.

The Liberals won a landslide majority government in the 1987 election, and Van Horne was easily returned in London North. He was not reappointed to cabinet on September 29, 1987, and he resigned from the legislature on December 31 of that year.

Van Horne died in Mount Hope, Ontario, on November 2, 2017, after a brief illness.
