= October 8 (film) =

2025 American documentary film

- Theatrical release poster
- Directed by: Wendy Sachs
- Produced by: Inbal B. Lessner; Nimrod Erez; Kelley Hartmann
- Cinematography: Tom Gat; Cameron Edwards-Wallis
- Edited by: Inbal B. Lessner; Nimrod Erez
- Music by: Sharon Farber
- Distributed by: Briarcliff Entertainment
- Release dates: January 12, 2025 (Miami); March 14, 2025 (United States)
- Running time: 100 minutes
- Country: United States
- Language: English
- Box office: $1.3 million

October 8 – The Fight for the Soul of America (October 8) is a 2025 documentary film directed by Wendy Sachs. Sachs and Debra Messing also served as executive producers.

== Synopsis ==
October 8 covers the 2024 pro-Palestinian protests on university campuses after the October 7 attacks. It describes how "anti-Israel sentiment came to a fever pitch in the immediate aftermath of the massacre" and argues such sentiment "morphed into antisemitism". The film includes interviews with Michael Rapaport, Noa Tishby, U.S. Representative Ritchie Torres, U.S. Senator Kirsten Gillibrand, Sheryl Sandberg, Dan Senor, Scott Galloway, Deborah Lipstadt, Bari Weiss, Shai Davidai, and Mosab Yousef. It explores the organization Students for Justice in Palestine (SJP), and argues that SJP promoted anti-Zionism and antisemitism on campus. The film also covers the role of social media in allegedly stoking antisemitism among young people.

In the film, University of California, Santa Barbara's (UCSB) student body president says she was harassed online and on campus after she condemned the October 7 attacks.

== Production ==
Co-produced by Wendy Sachs and Debra Messing, October 8 was co-edited by Inbal Lessner and Nimrod Erez. Sachs said she wanted the film to show a non-Jewish audience "what antisemitism looks like today—for them to see, when they see a 'Zionists not allowed' sign, that means 'Jew'".

== Release and distribution ==
October 8 was theatrically released in the United States on March 14, 2025, through Briarcliff Entertainment. It became available for streaming on April 1, 2025. The film grossed $1.3 million at the U.S. box office. The documentary screened at the Miami Jewish Film Festival.

== Reception ==
=== Critical response ===
On the review aggregator website Rotten Tomatoes, 63% of 19 critics' reviews are positive.

Elizabeth Weitzman of TheWrap also reviewed the film favorably, writing, "under ordinary circumstances, it might feel uncontroversial to make a film about the recent rise of antisemitism on college campuses" but "in this passionate and timely documentary" Sachs explores "how a culture war has unfolded across U.S. universities since the October 7 Hamas attacks on Israel."

Michael O'Sullivan of The Washington Post praised the film's "often-moving first-person student testimony" and noted its claim that Hamas may be behind SJP while lamenting its lack of criticism of the Israeli government and military. Frank Scheck of The Hollywood Reporter called out some cherry-picking and "questionable conclusions", adding, "But there's no denying the importance of its message and the need for corrective action by political, academic, religious and civil leaders".

The Times of Israel said the film looks closely at SJP but fails to discuss Qatari involvement in higher education in the United States, citing its own reporting that Qatar contributed as much as $4.7 billion to U.S. academic institutions between 2001 and 2021. In The Jerusalem Post, Greer Fay Cashman called the film Sachs's "crowning achievement". In Variety, Alissa Simon called it "one-sided" but still worth seeing for its coverage of antisemitism and the political fallout of the campus protests.

In Haaretz, Judy Maltz criticized the film for its black-and-white narrative and for failing to mention the thousands of Palestinians killed in Gaza or the humanitarian crisis. She wrote that the film ignores Jews who oppose the Israeli far-right's actions and rhetoric. Maltz wrote, "It may be true, as the film very much wants us to believe, that many of those taking to the streets of America are driven by antisemitism. But is also true that Israel does not have a great story to tell and that it is legitimate to criticize how it is prosecuting this war."

Pro-Palestinian publications denounced the film as Israeli propaganda and criticized it for conflating Zionism with Judaism. The left-wing magazine Current Affairs criticized the film for making virtually no mention of the Gaza genocide or of anti-Zionist Jewish groups or figures such as Jewish Voice for Peace and IfNotNow. Mondoweiss had similar complaints, criticizing the depiction of an attempted recall of University of California, Santa Barbara student president Tessa Veksler as antisemitic and saying that recall campaigns are not discriminatory but a feature of democracy. Mondoweiss said the film ignored right-wing antisemitism by associating with groups such as the Anti-Defamation League, which called Elon Musk's January 2025 salute, interpreted by many as a Nazi salute, "an awkward gesture in a moment of enthusiasm".

=== Awards ===
Sharon Farber's score was nominated for a Hollywood Music In Media Award.

== See also ==
- Blind Spot (2024 film)
- Reactions to the 2024 pro-Palestinian protests on university campuses
- The Encampments
- Tragic Awakening
- Universities and antisemitism
