= Follow Me: The Yoni Netanyahu Story =

- Film Poster
- Directed by: Jonathan Gruber; Ari Daniel Pinchot
- Written by: Jonathan Gruber
- Produced by: Jonathan Gruber; Ari Daniel Pinchot; Stuart Avi Savitsky
- Cinematography: David J. Goulding
- Edited by: David Grossbach; Laura Rose
- Music by: Charlie Barnett
- Production company: Crystal City Entertainment
- Distributed by: International Film Circuit
- Release date: May 18, 2012
- Running time: 87 minutes
- Country: United States
- Language: English

Follow Me: The Yoni Netanyahu Story is a 2012 American documentary film written by Jonathan Gruber, who co-directed the film with Ari Daniel Pinchot. The film documents the life and death of IDF officer Yonatan “Yoni” Netanyahu, a member of Sayeret Matkal and the elder brother of Israeli Prime Minister Benjamin Netanyahu. The film uses Yoni's writings, interviews, and archival footage to detail Yoni's personal life and achievements, culminating in his sacrifice during Operation Entebbe. Yoni's writings are read by New Zealand actor Marton Csokas.

== Interviewees ==
- Yiftach R. Atir - a member of Yoni's unit; author of The English Teacher, which inspired the 2019 film The Operative
- Shay Avital - a member of Yoni's unit; later Commander of Sayeret Matkal and head of the Depth Corps
- Omer Bar-Lev - a member of Yoni's unit; former Israeli Minister of Public Security
- Ehud Barak - a member of Yoni's unit; 10th Prime Minister of Israel
- Nava Barak - first wife of Ehud Barak and friend of Bruria Shaked-Okon
- Elisha Barmeir - Israeli radiologist and childhood friend of Yoni
- Avigdor Ben-Gal - former IDF General
- Tirza Goodman - Yoni's wife and mother of their miscarried daughter
- Amos Goren - a member of Yoni's unit
- Dani Litani - childhood friend of Yoni
- Avi Weiss Livne - a member of Yon's unit
- Chani Maayan - childhood friend of Yoni
- Benzion Netanyahu - father of Yoni Netanyahu, as well as Benjamin and Iddo; an Israeli encyclopedist, historian, and medievalist
- Benjamin Netanyahu - Yoni's younger brother and 9th Prime Minister of Israel
- Daphne Netanyahu - Yoni's sister-in-law and wife of Iddo Netanyahu
- Iddo Netanyahu - younger brother of Yoni and Benjamin and husband of Daphna Netanyahu; a physician, author, and playwright
- Shimon Peres - former Israeli Minister of Defense; the 8th Prime Minister and 9th President of Israel
- Shlomi Reisman - a member of Yoni's unit; a retired Lt. Col in the IDF
- Gideon Remez - a member of Paratroopers Battalion 890; an Israeli analyst and journalist
- Bruria Shaked-Okon - Yoni's girlfriend of two years at the time of his death
- Dani Vesely - a friend of Yoni and Bruria
- Matan Vilnai - former Commander of paratroopers (and later a Major General) for the IDF
- Giora Zorea - the commander of Yoni's unit during the Yom Kippur War

== Release ==
The film had a limited release on May 18, 2012, followed by a wider release on October 4, 2012. On Rotten Tomatoes, the film has a score of 50%, based on reviews from 14 critics.
