= Surge (2020 American film) =

2020 American documentary film

- Film poster
- Directed by: Wendy Sachs; Hanah Rosensweig
- Starring: Jana Lynn Sanchez; Lauren Underwood; Liz Watson
- Country of origin: United States
- Original language: English

Production
- Running time: 90 minutes

Original release
- Network: Showtime
- Release: September 8, 2020

Surge is a 2020 American documentary film. It follows the 2018 congressional campaigns of Jana Lynn Sanchez, Liz Watson, and Lauren Underwood. Alyssa Milano served as the executive producer. The film premiered on Showtime on September 8, 2020.

== Synopsis ==
The film follows the congressional campaigns of three women:

- Jana Lynn Sanchez (Texas's 6th congressional district)
- Lauren Underwood (Illinois's 14th congressional district)
- Liz Watson (Indiana's 9th congressional district)

While Sanchez and Watson end up losing their general elections, Underwood is elected.

== Production ==
Roll Call reported that Sachs "said the film intentionally featured women running to flip GOP-held seats," and Rosenweig hoped the film will "help galvanize voters and support women up and down the ballot" in 2020. Sachs told Jewish Insider that "this movement is definitely not a moment… but we need to keep up the work," [...] "We need to continue moving forward, we need to continue the activism on the ground and having women run for office and having women support women running for office."

== Critical reception ==
The documentary has received critical attention from a variety of sources. In a review for The Baltimore Sun, David Zurawik describes a statement by Sanchez in the documentary, "I was so devastated by the election results and so worried about our country," [...] "I didn’t sleep on November 8th, but I sure as hell woke up November 9th. I felt I could do something. I felt I had to do something. I just had to run. I had to do it," as "about as perfect a quote as you can find to show viewers the connection between the election of a man who boasted of sexually assaulting women in an infamous "Access Hollywood" interview and women running for office for the first time."

In a review for RobertEbert.com, Nell Minow writes, "All three women are enormously appealing, sincere, informed, passionate, and public-spirited." Minow further writes that even though all of the candidates did not win, "their experience shows other women what is possible." Tim Balk writes for the New York Daily News, "[Underwood's] victory and celebration inject a shot of emotional heft and feel-good movie magic to the documentary. But the races of Sanchez and Watson also have the power to jerk tears, and it’s an intimate film sprinkled with little moments: small conversations with prospective voters outside homes, or chats with loved ones about the race. In the end, Sanchez loses but comes closer than any Democrat in 36 years in her Texas district." Sabriya Imami writes for The Michigan Daily, "If “SURGE” reveals anything to audiences, it’s that women aren’t just relevant in politics; they are integral to the foundation of America’s government. “Women belong in all places where decisions are being made,” Justice Ruth Bader Ginsburg once said, and truer words have never been spoken."

== See also ==
- Knock Down the House (2019) – a similarly themed documentary about women running for Congress in the 2018 United States elections
