= Universities and antisemitism =

There has been antisemitism at universities since the medieval period. Antisemitism has manifested in various ways in universities, including in policies and practices such as restricting the admission of Jewish students by a Jewish quota, or ostracism, intimidation, or violence against Jewish students, as well as in the hiring, retention and treatment of Jewish faculty and staff. In some instances, universities have been accused of condoning the development of antisemitic cultures on campus.

In many jurisdictions, especially since World War II, discriminatory practices, including within the context of a university, are in breach of anti-discrimination laws, though antisemitic cultural values still persists on many campuses.

== Middle Ages to the early modern period ==
In the early Middle Ages, higher education in Europe largely centered around the monastery and was dominated by Roman Catholic men. Jews were rarely admitted to universities and faced a hostile environment when they were. Many medieval anti-Judaism writings were authored by university faculty.

In 1264, a man named "Jacob the Jew" sold land for the purpose of establishing Merton College, one of the first colleges to be incorporated in Oxford.

On 7 September 1434, the Roman Catholic church placed a ban on conferring any university degree upon Jews at the 24th canon of the Council of Basel. However, some ignored this decree, with the Senate of Venice in Italy bypassing the papal ban by empowering an official to confer degrees in higher education without regard to religion; as a result, some Jews in the 16th century managed to obtain doctoral degrees from Italian universities, including Bologna, University of Ferrara, Pavia, Perugua, Pisa, Rome, and Siena. Between 1517 and 1721, the University of Padua conferred 228 doctorates upon Jews.

However, even when admitted to a university, Jews faced challenges from both their religious principles and discriminatory treatment. For example, to fulfill their religious principles of Sabbath and holiday observance, Jewish students resort to various strategies in connection with examinations. Discrimination was experienced, for example, when Jewish had to pay higher graduation fees than did the Christian students or, in the 15th century, when they were required to invite all other students to dinner. Additionally, Jewish physicians in the 16th century had few, if any, opportunities for medical research, teaching, or for admission to the leading hospitals.

Overall, Jews were said to be kept out of universities by "a formidable iron curtain." Yet there were exceptions, such as the offer of a faculty position to Baruch Spinoza, a Jewish proponent of freedom of thought, by Heidelberg University.

== 18th and 19th century ==
With the Jewish emancipation period, Jewish students were increasingly admitted to universities, such as Polish Jews studying medicine at the University of Padua, Jews entering German universities, and Jews graduating from the Ivy League colleges in the U.S.

During this period, Johann Jakob Schudt, a Catholic author from Frankfurt, expressed concern over the Italian universities' disregard for the canon law of the Council of Basel. He criticized institutions such as the University of Padua for allowing "ignoramuses and even the despised Jews" to obtain degrees. Johann Heinrich Schuette later asserted in 1745 that awarding a medical doctorate to a Jew was inconsistent with Christian beliefs. As a result, Jews were largely excluded from the majority of European universities during this period.

The 19th century saw the tide of liberalism sweeping across England and academia, leading to the partial dismantling of old barriers. Government policies facilitated Jewish enrollments, thanks to the European Enlightenment. Joseph II, Holy Roman Emperor, issued a Patent of Toleration in 1782, Prussia enacted reforms starting in 1812.

During the 19th Century, Jewish scholars began to receive more regular appointments to university faculty, serving as professors at German, U.S., and even Russian universities.

However, Jewish students had to function in university settings that could be inhospitable. In Germany, Jews sometimes kept their Jewish identity under wraps, though they did form Jewish student associations by the 1880s. According to one scholar, they "students and student associations wove together a beautiful, vibrant and multifarious tapestry of German Jewish identity." There was an antisemitic backlash toward the end of the 19th century in Germany, when Jewish students encountered university faculty advocating modern racial antisemitism.

== 20th century ==
During the 20th century, there was strong growth in Jewish student enrollments and the inclusion of Jewish scholars in university research and teaching. However, Jewish enrollments were limited by policies in Poland, Hungary, Romania, and, during Stalin's regime, the USSR. During the Nazi era, German universities harbored antisemites and Jewish students and faculty were among the many targets of antisemitic persecution.

Demonstrating an interest in scholarship and education, in the face of persistent antisemitism, Jews also established universities, including Hebrew University of Jerusalem (1925), Yeshiva University (1928), and the Jewish-sponsored, secular Brandeis University (1946).

By the 1970s, Jews also started to serve as the administrative leaders at universities, including presidents or rectors at universities in Prague, Padua, Queens College, the University of Chicago, M.I.T., Brandon University, and Rutgers.

Antisemitism itself became an object of university research and teaching during the 20th century. For example, in 1920s Sweden, Hugo Valentin "staked out a new approach to the topic of antisemitism, in which Jewish characteristics and the so-called Jewish question, while not completely absent, were placed within parentheses. Instead, he presented antisemitism and individual antisemites as problems in their own right...." Besides extensive historical research, there has been in-depth research on antisemitism in psychology. The sociology of antisemitism can be traced back to Jewish scholars of early sociology, including Franz Boas, Arthur Ruppin and Georg Simmel, and includes Talcott Parsons' 1942 article, "The Sociology of Modern Anti-Semitism," and other studies in the post-War era. By the 1980s, some universities had established Holocaust research centers around the world, which also served to foster research on antisemitism.

=== Canada ===
Historian Gerald Tulchinsky has written that Canadian universities were "rife with antisemitism" in the early 20th century. Some universities restricted Jewish admission, Jews were banned from many fraternities and sororities, and many Jewish medical students were unable to find placements in Canada after graduation. (Despite this, Tulchinsky has also written that Canadian universities were "not hotbeds of antisemitism" in general and, indeed, that they played a significant role in the development of a Canadian Jewish culture.)

==== McGill University and the University of Toronto ====
McGill University imposed strict maximum quotas on Jewish students in 1920. Before the quotas were introduced, Jewish students represented 25% of arts students and 40% of law students. These rates fell significantly in the following years.

McGill continued to impose a 10% maximum quota on Jewish medical students until the 1960s; it was sometimes noted that the francophone Université de Montréal, unlike McGill, did not restrict Jewish admission after World War II. The University of Toronto's medical school also required higher marks of Jewish students until the 1960s, and Toronto's Jewish Mount Sinai Hospital was denied status as a teaching hospital until 1962.

==== Queen's University ====
In 1912, despite strong protests from Canada's Jewish community, the Government of Ontario approved a new constitution for Queen's University that included a phrase affirming that "the trustees shall satisfy themselves of the Christian character of those appointed to the teaching staff." In 1919, newly appointed principal R. Bruce Taylor made antisemitic statements at a meeting of university alumni, saying that "[t]he presence of many Jews tended to lower the tone of Canadian Universities." At least one graduate protested against this statement to the university's chancellor. Notwithstanding these developments, Tulchinsky has written that Queen's was "mildly more liberal" than McGill and the University of Toronto in accepting Jewish students and hiring Jewish faculty. Unlike the other universities, Queen's admitted German Jewish refugees as students in the 1930s and 1940s.

=== Germany ===
In April 1933, Nazi Germany passed laws barring Jews from holding any official positions, including teaching at universities. Historian Gerald Holton describes how, with "virtually no audible protest being raised by their colleagues", thousands of Jewish scientists were suddenly forced to give up their university positions and their names were removed from the rolls of institutions where they were employed. Notable German academics supportive of the Nazi regime included Martin Heidegger and Carl Schmitt.

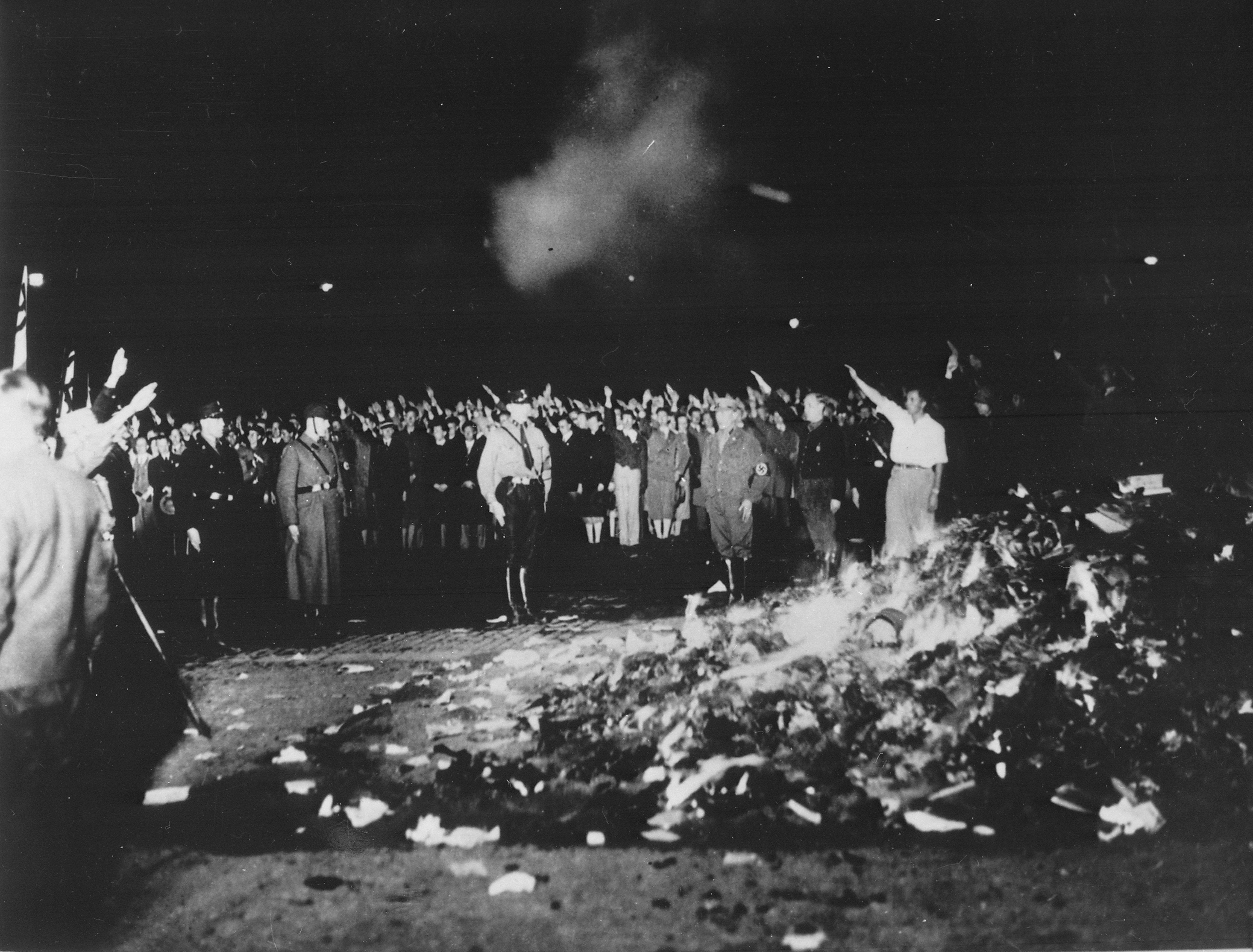
German university students burn non-German books in Berlin (1933)

Support for the Nazi regime was widespread across German higher education with almost no opposition. According to historians, "the universities made no serious effort in 1933–34 to resist the inroads of the Nazi state" and "Despite the presence of anti-intellectualism in the Nazi movement, however, we find a great deal of enthusiasm for Adolf Hitler in German universities. Student organizations had often turned Nazi even before Hitler rose to power, and the bulk of the faculty applauded Hitler's rise in 1933. Viewed from another angle, we search almost in vain for evidence of opposition to the regime within the universities." German universities not only assisted but "actively supported the expulsion of their academics for racial or political reasons."

In 1933, university students and members of the German Student Union launched a campaign of Nazi book burnings of Jewish, left-wing, and other books 'incompatible' with Nazi ideology. "On May 10, 1933, university students in 34 university towns across Germany burned over 25,000 books. The works of Jewish authors like Albert Einstein and Sigmund Freud went up in flames alongside blacklisted American authors such as Ernest Hemingway and Helen Keller, while students gave the Nazi salute. In Berlin 40,000 people gathered to hear German Minister of Public Enlightenment and Propaganda Joseph Goebbels give a speech in Berlin's Opera Square. He declared "the era of extreme Jewish intellectualism is now at an end. ... The future German man will not just be a man of books, but a man of character. It is to this end that we want to educate you." The Guardian reported that "Professors marched with students and Nazi Storm Troops escorting the ox carts, on which the books were laden, to the Opera House, where they were thrown on a bonfire of torches."

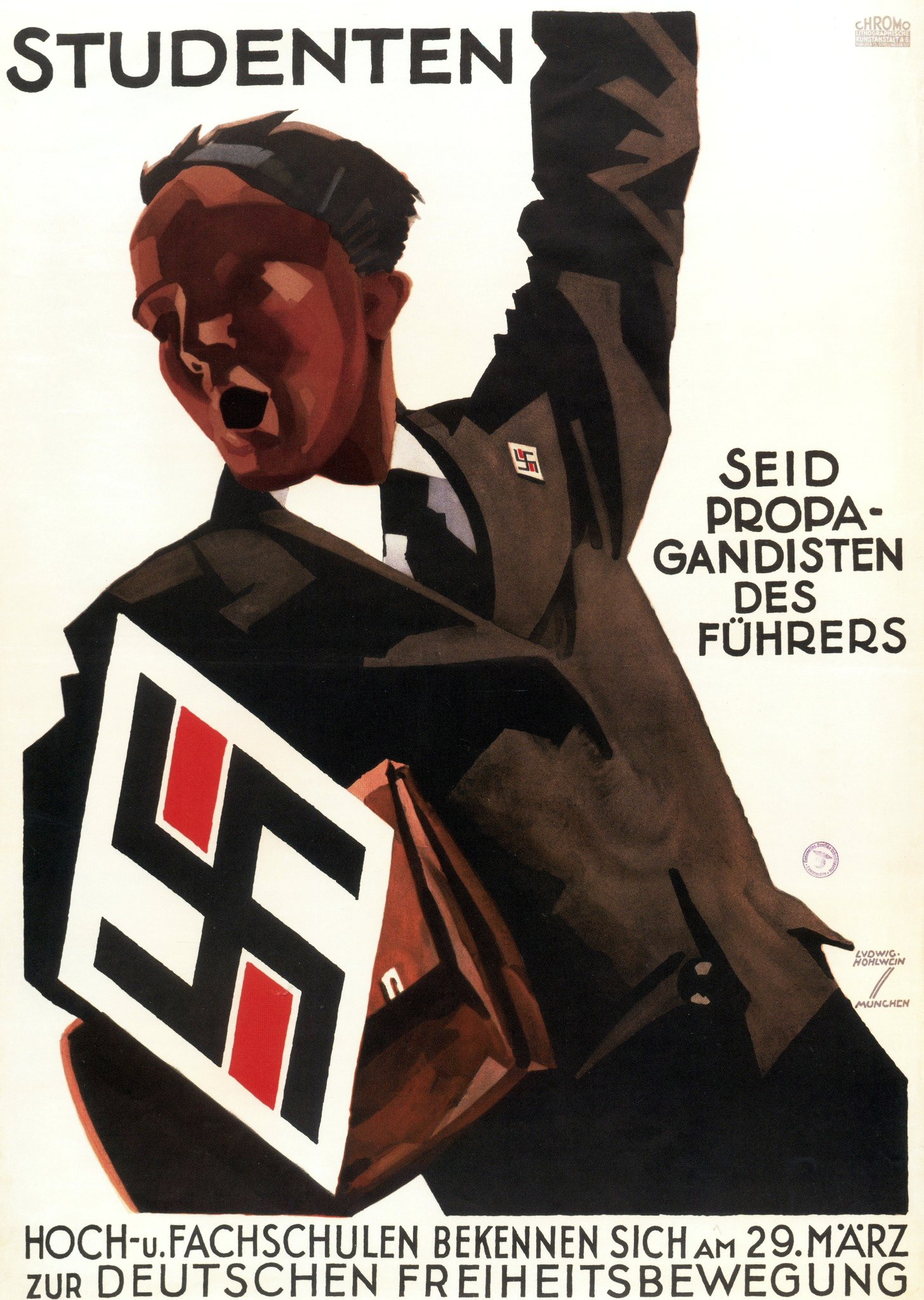
German Student Union poster which reads "Students Be the Führer's propagandists" in English

Most German academics quietly accepted or supported the Nazi regime and their university reforms and passively benefited from the persecution of their Jewish academic peers. "Very few, such as the small student group in Munich known as the White Rose, took any significant action to resist the Nazi dictatorship." There also existed a National Socialist German Students' League and Lecturers League. About two dozen leading professors received honorary or military appointments in the SS. According to historian Béla Bodo,

[German] students acted as a vanguard of Nazism at institutions of higher learning after 1933. Their continuing demonstrations against non-Aryan professors and the tacit support that they gave to radical Nazis to attack or otherwise harass their Jewish colleagues helped legitimize the Nazi revolution. Radical Nazis, backed by perhaps the majority of students, also pressured the authorities to move against the Jewish students. Their unruly behavior especially terrified conservative academic administrators, many of whom began registering nonAryans soon after the Nazi takeover. Academic administrators acquiesced in and helped carry out the expulsion of Jewish students for a number of reasons: some were convinced Nazis and radical antisemites who believed that the “cleansing” of schools was a prerequisite for the building of a new Germany; others supported the removal of non-Aryans for professional reasons; still others saw permanent exclusion as the only way of restoring peace on the campuses. As a telling sign of the professors’ attitude toward Hitler's regime, the rectors not only adhered to, but also tried to go beyond the first antisemitic laws in order to accelerate the expulsion process.

German university societies and fraternities were crucial in fomenting antisemitism and spreading Nazi ideology on university campuses. The German Student Union was in fact the first national organisation which fell under Nazi control as early as 1931. Paramilitary student groups often interrupted lectures, provoked skirmishes, and physically intimidated Jewish students in actions tolerated by university administrations and encouraged by the Nazi Party.

Professors in a wide range of disciplines, including the humanities, social sciences and natural sciences, used their research to further the goals of the Nazi regime. Carl Clausberg, a professor of gynaecology at the University of Königsberg experimented on Jewish and Romani women at the Auschwitz concentration camp in order to sterilise them without anaesthetic. Konrad Meyer, a professor of agronomy at the University of Berlin and SS-Oberführer, helped formulate Generalplan Ost, the Nazi plan for the extermination and large-scale ethnic cleansing of Slavs, Eastern European Jews, and other indigenous peoples of Eastern Europe categorized as "Untermenschen" in Nazi ideology. Nearly 900 professors signed the Vow of allegiance of the Professors of the German Universities and High-Schools to Adolf Hitler and the National Socialistic State in 1933.

=== Hungary ===
Moshe Y. Herczl has written that universities were part of a larger phenomenon of antisemitism in Hungary after World War I. Christian university students, sometimes joined by their professors, took part in violent demonstrations against Jewish student enrollment during the autumn of 1919. The authorities were forced to temporarily close the universities as a result of the disruption. Shortly thereafter, the Hungarian government prepared a law limiting Jewish enrollment to about 6% of the total university population.

Several departments at Peter Pazmany Catholic University in Budapest supported the proposed quota, as did the administration at the Technical University of Budapest. Some professors called for Jews to be banned from Hungarian universities entirely. After some debate, the Hungarian parliament passed the quota legislation by a vote of 57–7. It came into effect at the beginning of the 1920 academic year, coinciding with another round of antisemitic rioting on campuses. The number of Jews in Hungarian academic institutions fell dramatically in this period; at the University of Budapest, the numbers declined from 4,288 in 1917–18 to only 459 in 1920–21. Several European Jewish organizations opposed the Hungary quota law, arguing that it created a precedent that would be followed by other governments.

Antisemitic rioting continued at Hungarian universities into the 1930s; Jewish students were ostracized and often physically attacked. Christian student associations introduced a petition in 1933 that called for a strict enforcement of government quotas, while other groups passed antisemitic manifestos. The disruption once again led to a temporary closing of the universities.

Further antisemitic legislation was passed by the Hungarian parliament in 1939, on the eve of World War II. Among many other things, this legislation further restricted Jewish enrollment in universities.

== 21st century ==
Since 2000, evidence of antisemitic incidents on university campuses across North America, Europe, and Australia have been recorded by a number of sources. Though the circumstances surrounding the reported incidents are disputed, some maintain that campus activism supportive of the Palestinians and critical of Israel has created an atmosphere of anti-Jewish intimidation that erupts periodically in hate speech and even violence. Others acknowledge that antisemitic incidents have occurred, but dispute the extent of them, and contend that commentators have conflated political anger with ethnic or religious hatred in an attempt to chill legitimate debate.

=== Australia ===
In Australia, Daniel Wyner of the Australasian Union of Jewish Students, says that the "vilification we feel as students on campus ... [is] coming almost entirely from the left." Grahame Leonard, president of the Executive Council of Australian Jewry, says July 2006 had the most antisemitic incidents since records began in 1945, and that many of the incidents were on campus. In Sydney, some Jewish students have started to wear hats over their kippahs. Deon Kamien, former Victorian president of the Union of Jewish Students, told The Age: "It's not something I can put in words. A lot of students who would feel very comfortable wearing a kippah or T-shirt with Hebrew words on it now feel they are being targeted as Jews—not supporters of Israel, but Jews. When they walk past socialist stalls (on campus) they are called fucking Jews."

=== Canada ===
In September 2002, then-former Israeli prime minister Benjamin Netanyahu was prevented from delivering a speech at Concordia University in Montreal after a student protest turned violent. Some protesters harassed the predominantly Jewish audience that had arrived for the speech, and there were reports of Holocaust survivors being assaulted. Figures such as World Jewish Congress secretary Avi Beker described the incident as indicative of an "anti-Semitic campaign" on North American campuses, while journalist Lysiane Gagnon accused the university's pro-Palestinian students union of "refus[ing] to blame those who broke windows, threw chairs around, spat at and shoved the Jewish students who wanted to hear Mr. Netanyahu". The student union's vice-president of communications rejected Gagnon's charge, saying that his organization had on many occasions "publicly condemned any acts of physical violence [...] especially those acts that were antisemitic or anti-Arab in nature." A representative of Concordia's Solidarity for Palestinian Human Rights organization claimed that only a small minority of protesters had engaged in violent acts and argued that the protest itself was justified.

=== France ===
In France, Patrick Klugman, President of the Union of French Jewish Students (UEJF), wrote in Le Figaro in 2003: "On some university campuses like Nanterre, Villetaneuse and Jussieu, the climate has become very difficult for Jews. In the name of the Palestinian cause, they are castigated as if they were Israeli soldiers! We hear 'death to the Jews' during demonstrations which are supposed to defend the Palestinian cause. Last April, our office was the target of a Molotov cocktail. As a condition for condemning this attack, the lecturers demanded that the UEJF declare a principled position against Israel!"

=== United Kingdom ===
In the UK, the "Report of the All-Party Parliamentary Inquiry into Anti-Semitism" in 2006 reported that "when left wing or pro-Palestinian discourse is manipulated and used as a vehicle for anti-Jewish language and themes, the anti-Semitism is harder to recognize and define ..." The report describes how "tensions and incidents on campus often peak around students' union votes concerning Israel and Zionism," listing by way of example several incidents precipitated by a 2002 University of Manchester students' union motion to declare that anti-Zionism was not antisemitism, and that Israeli goods should be boycotted. During the voting phase, according to the Jewish Representative Council of Greater Manchester, a leaflet from the General Union of Palestinian Students quoting a neo-Nazi forgery entitled "Prophecy of Benjamin Franklin in Regard of the Jewish Race", was handed out to students lining up to vote. The leaflet described Jews as vampires, and said that if they were not expelled from the United States, they would "enslave the country and destroy its economy." When the motion was defeated, a brick was thrown through the window of one Jewish student residence while a poster with the words "Slaughter the Jews" was stuck to its front door, and a knife was stuck in the door of another.

In October, 2020, UK Education secretary Gavin Williamson sent a letter to vice-chancellors at English universities, accusing the universities of ignoring antisemitism.

In 2021, University of Bristol fired Professor David Miller following accusations of antisemitic comments. Miller had reportedly showed diagrams to students linking Jewish charities to Zionist lobbies and described the university's Jewish society as an 'Israel lobby group'. After being fired, Miller was quoted as saying 'Israel's assets in the UK have been emboldened by the university collaborating with them to shut down teaching about Islamophobia', while the Jewish society praised the decision. Since then, Miller has made other controversial comments, including a tweet claiming that 'Jews are not discriminated against' and are 'overrepresented in Europe, North America and Latin America in positions of cultural, economic and political power'

During the Gaza war, the Jewish charity organisation 'Community Security Trust' (CST) reported that there had been 67 antisemitic incidents from 7 October to 3 November across 29 campuses - an increase from 12 in the same period during the previous year. CST's follow-up report noted 272 antisemitic incidents during the 2023-2024 school year, over five times the number in the previous year. In one example, the University of Leeds Jewish chaplain received threats to rape and kill his wife and murder his children.

=== United States ===
A survey published in February 2015 by Trinity College and the Louis D. Brandeis Center for Human Rights under Law found that 54% of the participants had been subject to or witnessed antisemitism on their campus. The survey had a 10-12% response rate, does not claim to be representative, and included 1,157 self-identified Jewish students at 55 campuses nationwide. The most significant origin for antisemitism, according to the survey was "from an individual student" (29%). Other origins were: In clubs/societies, in lecture/class, in student union, etc.

However, a 2017 report from Brandeis University's Steinhardt Social Research Institute indicated that most Jewish students never experience anti-Jewish remarks or physical attacks. The study, "Limits to Hostility," notes that though often reported in the news, actual antisemitic hostility remains rare on most campuses. The study attempts to document student experience at the campus level, adding more detailed information to national-level surveys like the 2015 Trinity College Anti-semitism report. The report summary highlights that, though antisemitism does exist on campus, "Jewish students do not think their campus is hostile to Jews" across the campuses surveyed.

In September 2021, in collaboration with the Cohen Group, the Brandeis Center conducted a poll of American Jewish fraternity and sorority members. The survey found that more than 65% of the respondents had experienced or were familiar with an antisemitic attack in the previous 120 days. Nearly half of the respondents felt the need to hide their Jewish identity out of fear.

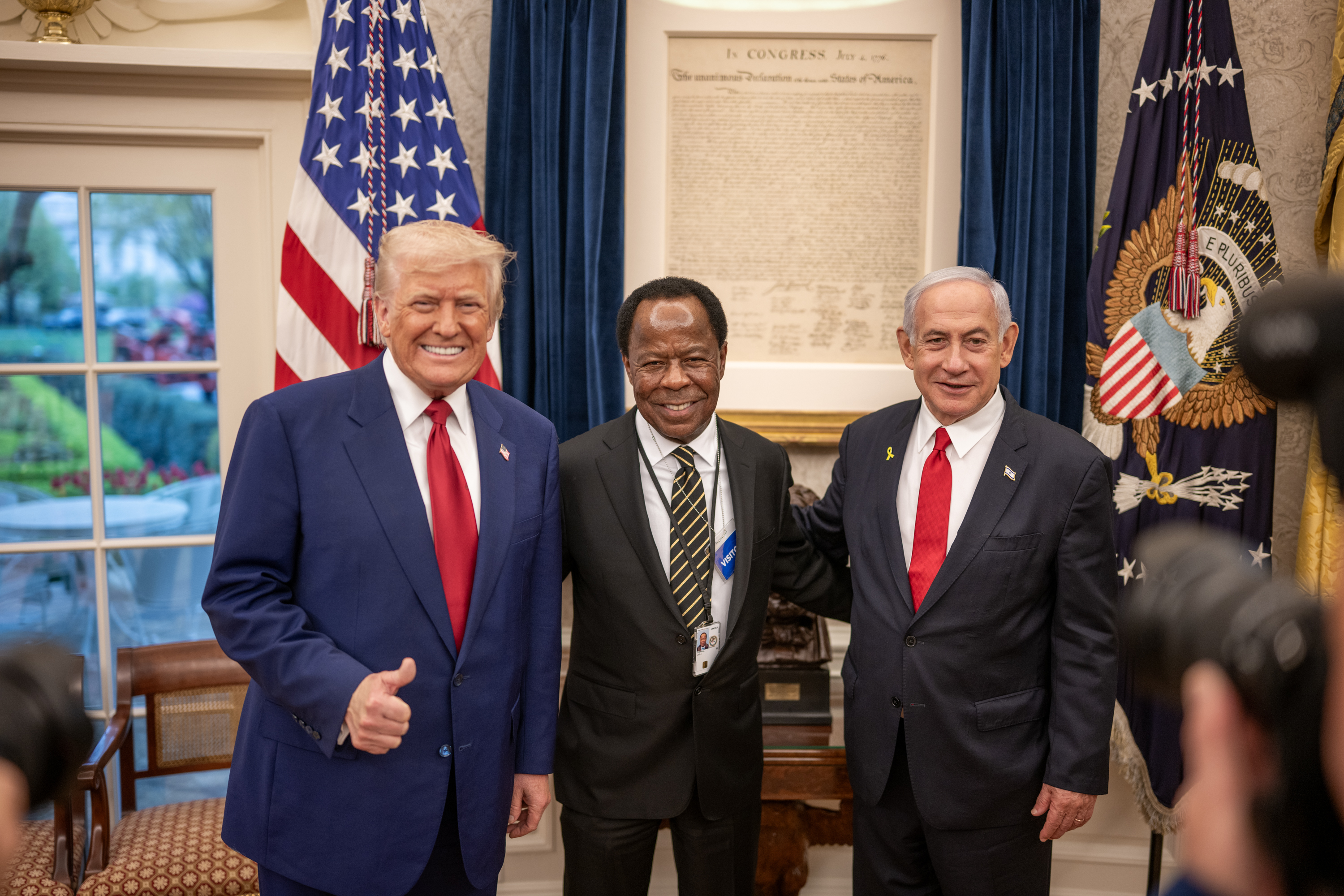
Leo Terrell, the head of the Trump administration's Task Force to Combat Antisemitism, with President Donald Trump and Israeli Prime Minister Benjamin Netanyahu on April 7, 2025

In 2022, several student groups at the University of Berkeley's School of Law banned inviting speakers who support Zionism or the State of Israel, citing concern for "the safety and welfare of Palestinian students on campus." However, whether anti-Zionism constitutes antisemitism is a longstanding, heavily disputed topic of political debate; Jewish individuals, Jewish allies, and antisemites have all expressed positions for or against Zionism.

In an effort to reduce the rise of antisemitism on college campuses, the Biden administration launched the first ever national strategy to combat antisemitism on May 25, 2023.

In February 2025, Leo Terrell, the chair of the Department of Justice's Task Force to Combat Antisemitism, announced that he would investigate Columbia University, Harvard University, George Washington University, Johns Hopkins University, New York University, Northwestern University, Berkeley University, the University of California, the University of Minnesota, and the University of Southern California as part of the Department of Justice's broader investigation into antisemitism on college campuses.

==== 2023 United States Congress hearing on antisemitism ====
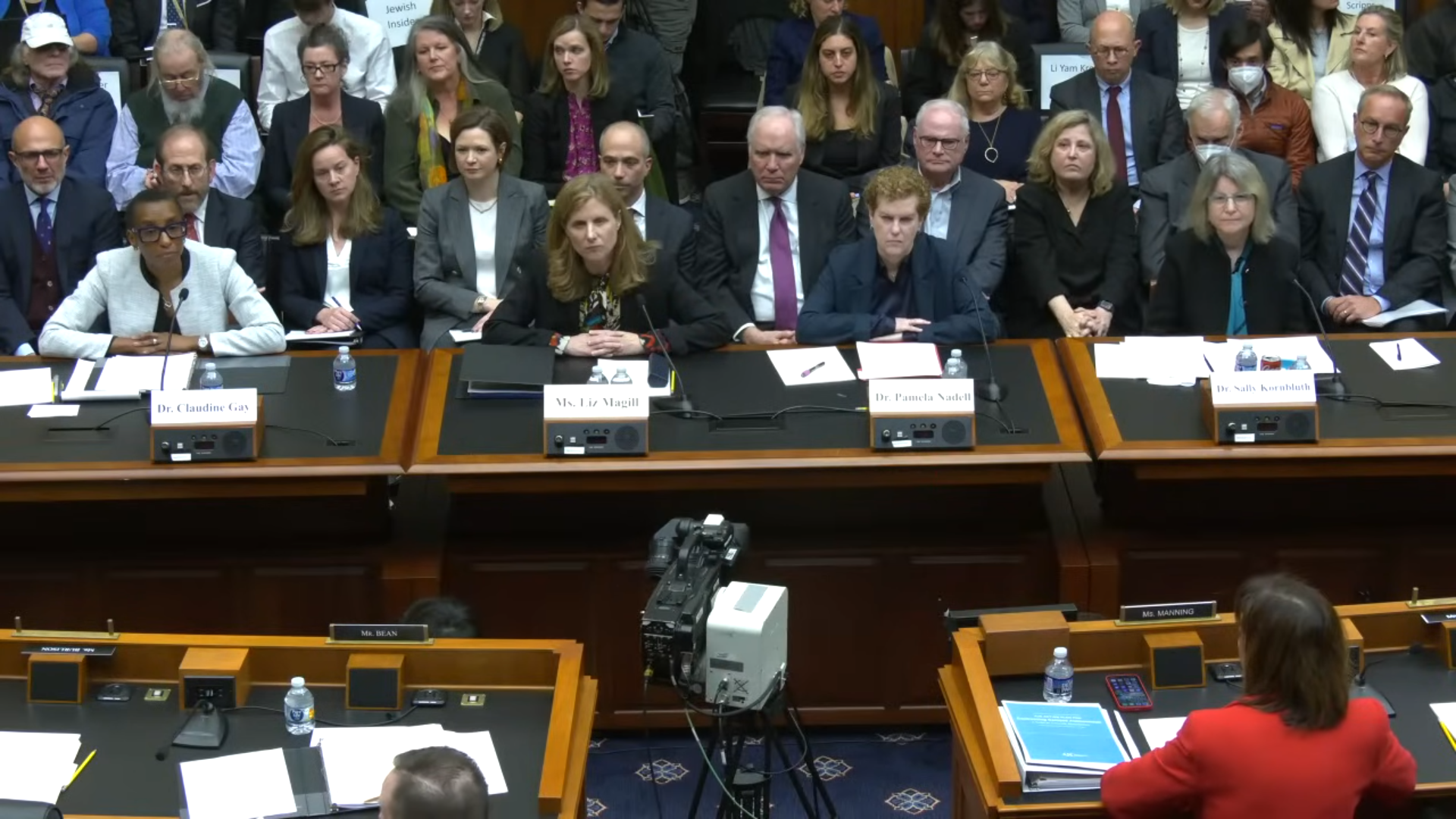
December 2023, antisemitism hearing in Congress

With the outbreak of the Gaza war (2023), U.S. universities became a focal point for activism about the Israeli–Palestinian conflict and concomitant concerns about antisemitism.

In December 2023, the presidents of Harvard, MIT, and UPenn testified in a five-hours long congressional hearing on antisemitism on campuses. The hearing resulted from the Department of Education's investigation into campus antisemitic incidents since the October 7th Hamas-led attack on Israel. The hearing gained widespread attention after presidents were each asked whether "calling for the genocide of Jews" violated their rules of bullying and harassment. During the hearing when Kornbluth, who is Jewish, said she had not heard any calls for genocide, Rep. Elise Stefanik claimed that chants of "Intifada" (Arabic) may be considered a "call for the genocide" of Jewish people. Each president replied that the answer at their institution depended on context.

Following the hearing, President Liz Magill of the University of Pennsylvania had posted a public apology and later resigned due to pressure from donors and criticism over her testimony. Claudine Gay, president of Harvard, responded that it depended on the context, but when "speech crosses into conduct, that violates our policies." Some alumni and donors called for Gay to resign and withdrew donations. Gay apologized for her remarks in the hearing and Harvard's board chose to keep her in office. On 2 January 2024, Gay resigned from the presidency of Harvard, partly due to accusations of plagiarism.

Additionally, a U.S. House of Representatives committee opened an investigation into the three schools that testified in the hearing. Congresswoman Virginia Foxx explained her dedication to exposing antisemitism by paraphrasing Genesis 12:3: "if you bless the Jewish people you will be blessed. If you curse the Jewish people you will be cursed.”

==== Harvard ====
Harvard University introduced policies in the twentieth century to reduce the number of Jews admitted to the university. The policies were introduced in response to the growing number of Jews admitted to the university, with the number of Jewish students admitted to Harvard growing from 7% in 1900 to 27.6% in 1925.

The policies were spearheaded by Abott Lawrence Lowell, president of Harvard University from 1909-1933. Lowell labeled the growth of Jewish students at Harvard as the "Jew problem" and asserted that the growing number of Jewish students at Harvard would "ruin the college." Lowell and others' prejudice against Jewish students were not based on religion, but more so on ethnic prejudice that framed Jews as "lacking class," being "overly grasping," and "overly ambitious" in their academic pursuits while showing little interest in extracurriculars. Non-Jews charged Jews with being "clanny, socially unskilled, and either unwilling or unable to 'fit in.'" Furthermore, there was also a prejudice against Jews because of their status as immigrants and people of lower socioeconomic status.

To reduce the number of Jewish students at Harvard, Lowell asked the committee of admissions to impose higher standards of admissions to members of "the Hebrew race," and wanted to cap the ratio of Jews in the student body at 15%. However, the admissions committee rejected this request because they were "reluctant to publicly endorse a policy of discrimination." Instead, the committee of admissions agreed to shift admissions in a way that would discreetly disadvantage Jews. Instead of continuing to admit students based on merit and academic achievement alone, which favored prospective Jewish students as they tended to measurably score higher on entry exams, admissions decided to introduce "character" and "fitness" criteria, which gave them more control over who was admitted and allowed them to weed out many of the academically high scoring prospective Jewish students who they deemed to not 'fit in' with the rest of the student body. Most of the time, this meant that the only Jews admitted to the university were those who did not publicly identify with their Jewishness and who did not fit ethnic stereotypes. In addition, Harvard also shifted to the prioritization of legacy admissions. By giving preference to children of alumni, Harvard could maintain the upper-class protestant student body, and exclude the children of Jewish immigrants.

Although disguised, these changes in admissions procedures intentionally and effectively reduced the number of Jewish students admitted to Harvard without having to actually say so. In 1926, the percentage of Jews dropped from 27% to 15%, and held steady at 15% for decades thereafter.

===== Harvard since 2020 =====
In 2022, a report by AMCHA Initiative had determined that Harvard University had the most antisemitic incidents on college campuses during the 2021-2022 academic year. The report mentioned dozens antisemitic incidents including Harvard University's campus newspaper endorsing the BDS movement (which described as rejecting “Jewish-self determination altogether” by Jewish leaders), held an event that was designed to “decolonize or de-Zionize Jewishness itself" by Harvard Professor Atalia Omer and more.

In October 2023, Harvard's alumni voiced their concern regarding the rise of antisemitism on campus following the October 7 attacks. In an open letter, the alumni condemned the ‘threatening’ nature of pro-Palestinian protests on campus. They also condemned the silence from several Harvard leaders regarding antisemitism on campus. The alumni letter also mentioned an assault against an Israeli student on campus.

On January 10, 2024, students filed a lawsuit against Harvard, led by Shabbos Kestenbaum, accusing it of having become a "bastion of rampant anti-Jewish hatred and harassment".

In January 2025, Harvard University settled two civil rights lawsuits accusing the university of allowing antisemitism on campus. As part of the settlement, Harvard agreed to adopt the International Holocaust Remembrance Alliance's (IHRA) definition of antisemitism, incorporate it into its nondiscrimination policies, and implement mandatory staff training to address antisemitism. The settlement also included commitments to provide resources for the study of antisemitism, establish a partnership with an Israeli university, and host an annual symposium on antisemitism. While Harvard denied any wrongdoing or liability, these measures were introduced to address the safety and inclusion of Jewish students on campus.

==== Columbia University ====
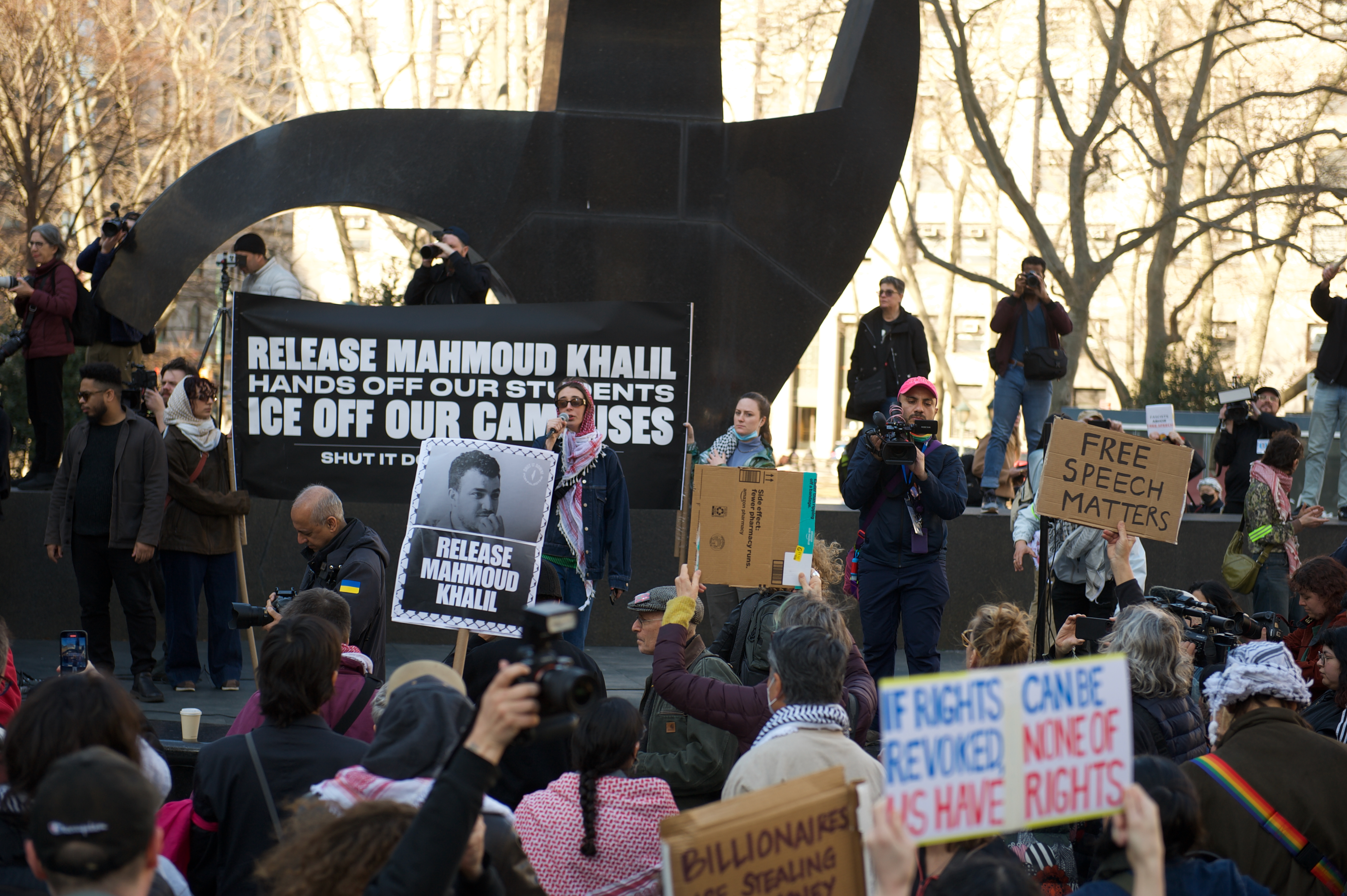
Protest against the detention of Mahmoud Khalil, New York City on March 10, 2025

==== Cornell University ====
After the October 7 attacks, Cornell University professor Russell Rickford spoke at an October 15 rally, calling the Hamas attacks "exhilarating". The university leadership condemned his remarks, and Senator Kirsten Gillibrand and Congresswoman Claudia Tenney called for him to be fired. He subsequently apologized for the remarks in The Cornell Daily Sun. On October 21, it was announced that Rickford would be taking a leave of absence for the remainder of the semester.

On October 29, threats against the Jewish community at Cornell University were posted online, threatening to shoot, rape, and murder Jewish students and encouraging violence against them. The FBI is investigating the incident as a hate crime. As of October 31, the New York State Police announced they had a person of interest in custody.

==== Duke University ====
Duke's chapter of Students Supporting Israel (SSI), an international pro-Israel movement, was denied recognition by the Duke Student Government (DSG) in November 2021. The incident attracted national media attention, and Duke SSI was officially recognized as a student organization in February 2022 after the student government reconsidered the group's application.

The sitting DSG president vetoed the recognition of Duke SSI in November 2021 five days after the group was recognized by the DSG Senate due to Duke SSI's social media response to claims of "promoting colonialism." This veto was upheld in a meeting by the Senate just two days later.

The incident garnered attention from a variety of individuals, outlets, and organizations. Duke President Vincent E. Price and Provost Sally Kornbluth issued a statement reiterating the university's commitment to equity. Other organizations such as The Louis D. Brandeis Center for Human Rights Under Law and the Zionist Organization of America, advocated on behalf of SSI after Duke's chapter of Students for Justice in Palestine (SJP) challenged SSI's existence. The Brandeis Center sent a letter to President Price alleging that the derecognition of Duke SSI constituted discrimination against a Jewish student organization.

DSG ultimately recognized SSI as a student organization on February 23, 2022.

==== Emory ====
Between 1948 and 1961, Emory University's former dental school engaged in discriminatory practices against Jewish students under the leadership of dean John Buhler. Arthur Levin, former Regional Director of the Anti-Defamation League, was the first to conduct research on the issue, and he found that 65% of Jewish students at Emory University's former dental school were flunked out or forced to repeat courses during those years, despite sound academic achievements and manual skills. Levin found that the rate of failures and repeats during that period was significantly higher than the rate of failures and repeats of Jews in years past and was also higher than the rate of failures and repeats of non-Jews during that period.

In 1961, Levin took his research findings to then Emory President, Walter Martin; however, the pattern of discrimination was consistently dismissed and denied. Evidence of discrimination mounted in the 1960s when the dental school changed its application form to include a section that asked applications to indicate their race as Caucasian, Jew, or other. Buhler resigned in 1961 but denied that it had to do with the allegations, and there was no acknowledgement or apology for the discriminatory practices.

In 2006, Associate Professor Eric Goldstein curated an exhibit on Jews at Emory, which included a bar graph that highlighted the rates of failures and forced repeats of Jews in the 50's. The exhibit inspired former dental student, S. Perry Brickman, to organize the production of a documentary film titled, From Silence to Recognition: Confronting Discrimination in Emory's Dental School History. In the film, former students recalled the shock of receiving letters from the school saying that their work was not up to par, with one student recalling the dean asking him, Why do you Jews want to go into dentistry? You don't have it in the hands. A common thread of the film was the shame students felt for decades thereafter. After the film premier, participants received a personal apology from President James Wagner, the first formal acknowledgement and apology from the school.

==== George Washington University ====
On the first day of classes in August 2022, George Washington University psychology professor Lara Sheehi allegedly told an Israeli student in front of other students: "It's not your fault you were born there." Jewish students reported that Sheehi harassed that same student by encouraging other students to demean and exclude them. They criticized Sheehi's choice of Nadera Shalhoub-Kevorkian as guest lecturer on September 30, 2022. In 2019, Dr. Shalhoub-Kevorkian praised a teenager for attempting to stab two Israelis to death and allegedly used antisemitic language in her classes at Hebrew University. After Dr. Shalhoub-Kevorkian spoke to the class, Jewish students reported feeling "unsafe" and one student left the class crying. Jewish students claim that when they tried to explain their discomfort hearing Dr. Shalhoub-Kevorkian speak, Sheehi accused them of using Islamophobic language and being anti-Palestinian.

Jewish students accused newly-unearthed tweets from Sheehi's since-deleted Twitter account of being antisemitic, such as tweets calling to "destroy Zionism" and describing the Israeli military "genocidal fucks." Jewish students also expressed disappointment when Sheehi refused to use the International Holocaust Remembrance Alliance (IHRA) working definition of antisemitism to define hatred of Jews, because she felt it would interfere with the George Washington University's free speech principles.

In January 2023, Jewish students filed a complaint at the U.S. Department of Education's Office of Civil Rights (OCR). As a result of the OCR complaint, school administrators a third-party investigation from independent law firm, Crowell & Moring LLP. In February 2023, Sheehi responded to the January OCR complaint and investigation. Sheehi asked school administrators to release the in-class recording to prove she said nothing antisemitic.

In May 2023, Crowell & Moring cleared Sheehi of antisemitism charges, having found a lack of supportive evidence to prove the claims. Crowell & Moring, George Washington University administrators, and Jewish students all agreed to pursue remediation. School administrators also brought in facilitators to create a "restorative circle" – a mechanism bringing community members together to discuss harmful behavior in a path towards accountability – between faculty and students.

Although George Washington administrators closed their investigation, the OCR investigation remains open.

==== Stanford ====
Stanford University launched an internal task force in 2022 to investigate the history of Jewish admissions and experience at the university. The task force was formed after the publication of an online newsletter by Dr. Charles Petersen in 2021 entitled "How I Discovered Stanford's Jewish Quota". In that newsletter, Dr. Petersen shared letters and documents he found in the Stanford archives that pointed toward a pattern of discrimination against Jewish applicants at Stanford in the 1950s. Petersen's essay was the first to substantiate rumors regarding the existence of a quota on Jewish students at Stanford that had been floating for decades. The task force was intended to conduct university-led research to confirm, deny, or elaborate on Petersen' findings.

The task force confirmed Petersen's claims, while adding additional evidence that the university intended to reduce and restrict the number of Jewish students at Stanford University. The New York Times reported in an opinion piece how the results of the Task Force were "long awaited" and came as "no shock" to the Jewish community. The task report highlighted a 1953 letter from Rixford Snyder, Assistant of Admissions Director, to J.E. Wallace Sterling, then President of Stanford. In the letter, Snyder informed Sterling of the fact that the incoming freshmen class would have "a high percentage of Jewish boys," a "problem" Snyder thought Sterling should know, "since it has very touchy implications." Rix elaborated and warned of how schools in the East, such as the University of Virginia and Cornell, have a very heavy Jewish enrollment and have become largely Jewish institutions.

Also uncovered by the task force was a memo explaining that Snyder identified "a number of high schools in Los Angeles," including Beverly Hills High School and Fairfax High School, "whose student body [sic] runs from 95 to 98% Jewish." Snyder wrote, "if we accept a few Jewish applicants from these schools, the following year we get a flood of Jewish applications," noting that "apparently the information as to who is accepting or rejecting Jewish students travels fast though [Sic] the underground." In light of this, admissions decided to first stop including Beverly Hills and Fairfax high school in recruiting efforts and then reject the majority of those who still applied.

Snyder's strategy was effective as the number of Jewish students enrolled at Stanford from these schools dropped after implementing these changes. According to the task report, Stanford enrolled 67 students from Beverly Hills and 20 students from Fairfax between 1949 and 1952, but only 13 students from Beverly Hills and 1 from Fairfax between 1952 and 1955. The registrars' records indicate no other public school experienced such a steep drop in student enrollment during that time period, or any other period during the 1950s and 1960s. The task force asserted that it is reasonable to conclude that the drop in enrollment was due to the university's reduction in both recruitment and offers of admissions to Jewish high school students, and that this reduction was intentional and targeted.

Stanford University's Task Force also addressed how the university evaded claims that they were discriminating against Jewish applicants and students. The report notes that students, parents, and alumni who raised concerns had their concerns immediately denied and dismissed by the administration. In letters and in public, administrators took advantage of the fact that the university did not have an official "quota" like other universities, and highlighted the fact that they did not ask about ethnicity or religion on applications. However, it was clear that admissions primarily used student enrollment at high density Jewish schools, and other supporting information like father's occupation, mother's name, and required headshots, as a proxy that an applicant was Jewish. Despite consistent and convincing claims that the university was discriminating against Jewish applicants and students, the report notes that the university continued to mislead alumni, the Anti-Defamation League, at least one trustee, and faculty.

The first institutional apology was issued in a public letter from the current president of Stanford, Marc Tessier-Lavigne, shortly after the publication of the task report in 2022. Tessier-Lavigne apologized on behalf of the university for discriminating against Jewish students in addition to denying and dismissing claims for decades thereafter and committed to taking steps to enhance Jewish students' experience at Stanford. Rabbi Jessica Kirschner, executive director of Hillel at Stanford, said in an email that "for the people who knew there was something wrong despite official denials, hearing the symbolic head of the university speak the truth out loud and apologize is validating, and maybe even healing." She added that the university's response is an example of what institutional apologies can and should look like, noting how "a new generation of Stanford leadership took evidence seriously, commissioned a strong task force, and did not flinch when its findings did not reflect well on the institution." Others, including President Alyza Lewin of the Louis D. Brandeis Center for Human Rights Under Law, praised the university for acknowledging the mistakes of its past, but also urged the university to acknowledge the discrimination and harassment that Jewish students continue to experience at Stanford.

From 2019 to 2021, Stanford's Counseling & Psychological Services (CAPS) division was the subject of allegations regarding a culture of anti-Semitism. In December 2019, CAPS announced the formation of a Diversity Education and Inclusion (DEI) committee made up of CAPS staff and that it would begin weekly DEI seminars. In January 2020, CAPS set up separate "affinity groups" based on race, intended to help staff understand cultural and racial groups and biases. One affinity group was designated for white people and the other for people of color. Rather than create a group for people of Jewish ancestry where members could discuss their lived Jewish experience, CAPS instead pressured Jewish employees to join the white affinity group – despite the fact that 12-15% of Jews in America identify as Jews of color.

In May 2020, Zoom-bombers hijacked a Stanford University townhall and broadcast racist messages, displayed images of swastikas and weapons, and made use of the N-Word. The CAPS DEI group omitted mention of anti-Semitism in its post-mortem of the incident. A CAPS committee member explained: "the DEI committee decided to omit any mention of anti-Semitism so as not to dominate the discussion about anti-Black racism."

In July 2020, swastikas were found inside of Stanford's Memorial Church. At a DEI seminar following the swastikas' discovery, Dr. Ronald Albucher, a Jewish CAPS employee, asked that the DEI program discuss the incident at one of their weekly meetings. The DEI facilitators said they would discuss it only if time allowed, and ultimately there was no discussion or official mention of the anti-Semitic incident. In January 2021, CAPS diversity trainers said that they take an anti-Zionist approach to social justice, and they described Jews as connected to white supremacy.

Dr. Albucher and his colleague Sheila Levin, another Jewish CAPS employee, filed official complaints with the U.S. Equal Employment Opportunity Commission (EEOC) and the California Department of Fair Employment and Housing (DFEH) through the Louis D. Brandeis Center for Human Rights Under Law. The EEOC opened an investigation based on the complaint. On January 10, 2022, EEOC Commissioner Andrea Lucas called the allegations within the complaint "deeply troubling".

In the days following the October 7 attacks, a Stanford instructor was removed from teaching duties after it was reported that he claimed the attacks were justified, singled out Jewish students in his class, and downplayed the Holocaust. Stanford's leadership was criticized for not unequivocally condemning terrorism and antisemitism.

==== Tufts ====
Students for Justice in Palestine (SJP) launched a campaign against U.S.-Israel police partnerships at Tufts University in 2018 after a Freedom of Information Act request revealed that a former police officer at Tufts participated in a "military training trip" to Israel.

In November 2020, SJP introduced a referendum for the student election ballot to show Tufts administrators that students did not support alleged militarization of Tufts University Police Department (TUPD), sending officers to train in Israel or with any military bodies, and against the hiring of officers who have participated in such programs. In addition to submitting this referendum to students, they also presented it to the Tufts Community Union Judiciary (TCUJ), a seven-member group that is tasked with fact checking and removing bias from student government legislation.

TCUJ member Max Price expressed concern, stating that the campaign and referendum rested on mistruths. Price's research showed the law enforcement exchange programs are not military trips, as written in the initial referendum, and that the event contained no training or military meetings with active military officials in Israel. He cited that all previous participating Palestinian and Israeli officers described the event as an educational seminar hosted by the Anti-Defamation League (ADL). Price clarified that it was the ADL who invited and sponsored the Tufts officer, not that the university had sent them as mentioned in the referendum. And Price showed how the initial referendum submitted called for discrimination against veterans, a protected class. On these fact-based premises, Price asserted that the referendum needed to be amended before it could be approved, and all members of the TCUJ agreed.

After these critiques, SJP asked for Price to be excluded from the vote and discussion due to alleged bias related to him being Jewish and Pro Israel. Price refused to recuse himself from decisions on the referendum. Student government officials interviewed Price for two hour-long sessions to evaluate his personal beliefs, identity, and alleged bias. Their conclusion was that Price had not shown any bias during the TCUJ deliberations and that his critiques of the referendum language had all been fact-based. The TCUJ student government participants determined there was no need for Mr. Price to recuse himself.

SJP continued its demand that the Chair of TCUJ remove Mr. Price from the TCUJ's consideration of the referendum language. SJP filed a complaint against Price demanding his impeachment and removal from TCUJ. In response to SJP's continued pressure, the TCUJ Chair silenced Mr. Price by requiring him to remain "on mute" for the entire TCUJ Zoom meeting held on November 18, 2020, a decision he was not informed of until after the meeting had already started. Members of the Tufts Community Union Senate made anti-Semitic statements and "demonstrate[d] personal bias against Price", and later threatened him with a disciplinary hearing and removal from TCUJ.

Price reported these incidents to the Tufts University administration but did not receive an adequate response. Price reached out to the Louis D. Brandeis Center for Human Rights Under Law for legal assistance. The Brandeis Center represented Price and wrote a letter to Tufts University President Anthony P. Monaco. This letter urged the university to stop the upcoming hearing because these actions were in violation of Price's right to freedom of speech and Title VI of the Civil Rights Act. Ultimately, the hearing was canceled. Tufts University officials did not issue any public statements condemning TCUJ actions against Price or the university's position on the hearing.

Forty two percent of the student population voted on this referendum, which was reported as the highest recorded voter turnout of any "special election" in Tufts history. The referendum passed with 68% of students voting. The Tufts administration did not respond to the demands of this referendum.

==== University of California, Berkeley ====
On August 21, 2022, Berkeley Law Student for Justice in Palestine (Berkeley LSJP) announced nine student organizations adopted a "pro-Palestine bylaw" and vowed not to "invite speakers that have expressed and continued to hold views or host/sponsor/promote events in support of Zionism, the apartheid state of Israel, and the occupation of Palestine." Berkeley Law Muslim Student Association, Middle Eastern and North African Law Students Association, Womxn of Color Collective, Asian Pacific American Law Students Association, Queer Caucus, Community Defense Project, Women of Berkeley Law, and Law Students of African Descent were among the student organizations who signed the Law Students for Justice in Palestine at Berkeley Law pledge. This pledge supported the Boycott, Divestment and Sanctions (BDS) movement and called for the suppression of pro-Israel and pro-Zionist rhetoric.

Former Assistant U.S. Secretary of Education for Civil Rights; Staff Director at the U.S. Commission on Civil Rights; General Deputy Assistant U.S. Secretary of Housing and Urban Development for Fair Housing and Equal Opportunity; and current Chairman of the Louis D. Brandeis Center for Human Rights Under Law Kenneth L. Marcus authored an op-ed in the Jewish Journal about the bylaw, titled: "Berkeley Develops Jewish-Free Zones." The article went viral and attracted national attention to the campus conflict. In an interview, Mr. Marcus, a Berkeley law school alumnus, said that he was contacted by law students there who were concerned about the bylaw. He said he spent weeks trying to support them and wrote his article after Berkeley did not "rectify the problem." Senator Ted Cruz of Texas and Barbra Streisand both tweeted about the article.

Berkeley Law Dean Erwin Chemerinsky described the bylaw as anti-Semitic, but defended his decision not to disband or punish the student groups by stating "it is important to recognize that law student groups have free speech rights, including to express messages that I and others might find offensive."

Numerous organizations and institutions have shared concerns regarding the Law school's bylaws. Attorneys Arsen Ostrovsky and Gabriel Groisman filed a complaint in November 2022 with the U.S. Department of Education Office for Civil Rights (OCR) pursuant to Title VI of the Civil Rights Act of 1964[SP1]. OCR opened a formal investigation in December 2022. [SP2] Since August, StandWithUs and others have called on law firms to stop funding anti-Semitic Berkeley Law student groups.

==== University of California, Los Angeles ====
In April 2024, anti-Israel students at UCLA established a campus encampment during the ongoing Israel-Hamas War. The university provided the encampment with private security and metal barricades “to prevent violent confrontations between... protesters.” Ultimately, however, the anti-Israel protestors did not allow students who refused to denounce Israel onto UCLA campus grounds, which was viewed as a “Jew Exclusion Zone” by many students on campus. UCLA did not prevent the misuse of their resources that were used to deny Jewish students access to Royce Quad, a central part of UCLA's campus.

In June 2024, three Jewish students filed a lawsuit against UCLA, alleging “that the university played a role in preventing them from accessing the campus freely during protests, when they were blocked from entering the pro-Palestinian encampment erected by protesters.” The students were represented by Becket Law. In July 2024, a federal judge ordered that UCLA must “create a plan to ensure Jewish students have equal access to campus” as a result of the lawsuit.

==== University of North Carolina at Chapel Hill ====
Following a wave of anti-Israeli and at times antisemitic protests and events on campus following the October 7, 2023, Hamas attack on Israel, the Anti Defamation League gave in April 2024 UNC Chapel Hill the grade "F" in its "Campus Antisemitism Report Card".

==== University of Pennsylvania ====
In December 2023, two Jewish students filed a lawsuit against the University of Pennsylvania, alleging discrimination against Jewish individuals on its campuses. The students asserted that the university violated Title VI of the Civil Rights Act of 1964 by failing to address a "hostile environment" on campus. Despite the lawsuit being prompted by a rise in antisemitism following the October 7, 2023 attacks, it references incidents predating the attack. One of the incidents mentioned in the suit occurred on October 9, two days after the Hamas attack, where a student wearing a Star of David was identified as Jewish by a group of pro-Palestine protestors. One of them verbally harassed her with anti-Semitic remarks, shouting, "You are a dirty Jew, don't look at us." The case docket details over 100 incidents of antisemitism on campus since 2015.

==== University of Vermont ====
In 2021, the Anti-Defamation League reported that the University of Vermont had the highest number of reported anti-Semitic incidents. In the same year, The Louis D. Brandeis Center for Human Rights Under Law and Jewish on Campus filed a complaint against the University of Vermont alleging that the university fostered a hostile environment for Jewish students, and did not respond adequately to anti-Semitic incidents. The complaint argued that students were excluded from organizations on campus for being Jewish, students threw rocks at a dorm that housed Jewish students, and that a teaching assistant bragged on social media about subtracting participation points from Jewish students. Initially, the university attempted to push back against the allegations of anti-Semitism; university President Suresh Garimella stated that “the uninformed narrative published this week has been harmful to UVM” and that the investigation “painted our community in a patently false light.”

In April 2023, the Education Department's Office for Civil Rights (OCR) identified areas of concern within the university's policies that “...have allowed a hostile environment for...Jewish students to persist at the university." OCR officials noted that “it does not appear that the university...took action...until after the commencement of OCR's investigation." The university agreed to settle the complaint, resolving to edit their discrimination and harassment policies and provide extra training to staff and students “on the prohibition of harassment based on national ancestry." “In the wake of a landmark settlement with the federal government, there has been a remarkable evolution in visible support for Jewish students,” stated UVM Hillel Executive Director Matt Vogel.

In May 2023, over 150 university faculty members signed an open letter calling on President Garimella to “provide an accurate account of what transpired that led to the (Office of Civil Rights) investigation.”

== Causes ==
Anti-Semitism at universities during the 19th through 20th centuries has been explained in terms of racism, xenophobia, psychological projection, and scapegoating. More recently, in the 21st century, Suzanna Sherry has argued that the establishment and proliferation of Diversity, Equity, and Inclusion (DEI) offices has directly contributed to anti-Semitism at American universities.

== See also ==
- Antisemitism studies
- Academic boycott of Israel
- Campus Watch
- Ghetto benches
- Antisemitism during the Gaza war
- Normalization of antisemitism
- Crossing the Line 2: The New Face of Anti-Semitism on Campus
- October 8
- Blind Spot
