= Beneath the Helmet =

2014 American documentary film

Beneath the Helmet: From High School to the Home Front
- Official Poster for 'Beneath the Helmet'
- Directed by: Wayne Kopping
- Written by: Baruch Goldberg
- Produced by: Raphael Shore; Rebecca Shore; Baruch Goldberg; Oren Rosenfeld
- Cinematography: Aviv Vana; Sasha Gorev
- Music by: Miri Ben-Ari
- Release date: October 28, 2014
- Running time: 80 minutes
- Country: United States
- Language: English

Beneath the Helmet: From High School to the Home Front is a 2014 documentary film which explores the personal experiences of five Israeli high school graduates who are recruited to serve in the army paratrooper brigade for their compulsory military service.

== Synopsis ==
Beneath the Helmet: From High School to the Home Front is a coming of age story that follows the lives of five Israeli high school graduates who are recruited to serve in the army paratrooper brigade for their compulsory military service - which is viewed in Israel as a rite of passage into Israeli society.

The filmmakers follow a lone volunteer soldier from Switzerland, an Ethiopian immigrant, a grandson of Holocaust survivors, a female sergeant who originally planned to evade army service, and the unit commander. The film documents their reactions to their army service, fears, responses to the danger of combat, and their families' reactions to their experiences.

== Characters ==
Guy Leon Sheetrit, Sergeant

Guy is a sergeant in the 101st Paratrooper brigade basic training base. Guy grew up in Jerusalem He is an eighth-generation Israeli, He is responsible for the basic military training, education and welfare of 12 soldiers Guy was one of other 4 sergeants in the 101st Paratrooper Brigade basic training base.

Eden Adler, First Lieutenant

Eden is a commander in the 101st Paratrooper Brigade basic training base; this is his first assignment. The son of an American mother and a Yemenite father, Eden grew up in the Western Galilee town of Kfar Vradim. He had serious learning disabilities as a child. He is directly responsible for the lives, safety and operational effectiveness of 36 recruits and 4 sergeants.

Eden sees his task as not just about making good soldiers, but about inspiring his recruits to grow, change and become involved citizens after their army service. In the film, Eden is seen taking responsibility upon himself for helping his soldiers overcome personal problems.

Oren Giladi, Private

Oren is from Switzerland. He left Israel at age 5 and has decided to come back and serve in the IDF. He left his family and friends behind in Switzerland to do basic training with the 101st Paratrooper Brigade in the Negev Desert. One of his best friends is Mekonan Abebe, whom he met while riding on the bus to the paratrooper base.

Mekonan Abebe, Private

At age 12, Mekonan emigrated to Israel from Ethiopia, his father dying suddenly just hours before they were to board the plane. After making aliyah, he was raised by his mother in a 2-room apartment in a Tel Aviv suburb that he shares with 9 other family members. In Israel for just 6 years, he is proud and excited to be a part of the Paratroopers; however, he faces a number of obstacles. Despite the fact that they come from different worlds, Mekonan has forged a deep friendship with Swiss immigrant and fellow soldier Oren Giladi.

Eilon Cohen, Private

A fun-loving jokester, Eilon has a lot to learn to become a successful soldier. He is a second-generation Israeli, the grandson of refugees who fled Nazi Europe to South America, and later emigrated to Israel. The oldest of three siblings, being the first in his family to be enlisted has been a major milestone for Eilon and his family. Raised in Ashdod, Eilon plays guitar, surfs and is into extreme sports.

Coral Amarani, Sergeant

Coral is from the affluent sea-side neighborhood of Herzliya Pituach. An only child, she originally planned on evading her army service but changed her mind. She is a drill sergeant at Michvei Alon, a pre-basic training program that helps soldiers successfully integrate into the IDF. She is responsible for the basic military training, education and welfare of 12 soldiers, many of whom come from foreign countries.

== Release ==
Beneath the Helmet: From High School to the Home Front was released on November 5, 2014 in Israeli and U.S. theaters.

== Reception ==
- Richard Stellar writing in The Wrap summarized his take away from the film saying "the real gift of this movie is that it shows the greatest asset of any nation, their children, have the most to give, and the most to lose."
- Tuvia Book, writing in the Times of Israel, described the film as "inspirational and "thought provoking" and said "One of the fascinating aspects of the film was that it was unscripted. The soldiers spoke directly from their hearts... they serve in the army for three years (or more) because they truly feel a deep connection to the country, love for the land, and take upon themselves the responsibility of ensuring that the people living in Israel and Jews throughout the world feel secure."
