= Tragic Awakening =

2024 Israeli documentary film

- Poster
- Directed by: Wayne Kopping
- Starring: Rawan Osman; Michal Cotler-Wunsh
- Country of origin: Israel
- Original language: English

Production
- Executive producers: Pamela Claman; Gila Milstein; Doug Weiser; Shalom Schwartz
- Producer: Raphael Shore
- Editor: Wayne Kopping
- Running time: 53 minutes

Original release
- Release: 2024

Tragic Awakening: A New Look at the Oldest Hatred is a 2024 documentary film directed by Wayne Kopping. It looks at the roots of antisemitism, aiming to turn hatred into inspiration and strength for Jewish identity and Western values.

== Synopsis ==
In the film, academics, legislators, media analysts, and thought leaders including Rabbi Lord Jonathan Sacks, Yossi Klein Halevi, former MK Michal Cotler-Wunsh, and journalist Bari Weiss comment on the causes of antisemitism. Narrator Rawan Osman, a Syrian-born Arab Zionist, describes her reaction when she learned about Jewish history and came to view herself as being formerly indoctrinated: "I was angry. Because the Jew is not my enemy". The film features a series of conversations between Shore and Osman.

== Production ==
Filmmaker Raphael Shore was motivated to make the film after antisemitic incidents increased following the October 7 attacks/Gaza war. He was finishing work on his book Who's Afraid of the Big Bad Jew?, exploring similar themes, and decided to make a companion film. Shore described antisemitism as resistance to the Jewish people's "deep spiritual message and challenge to the world". He called the conventional wisdom that Jews are historical scapegoats "superficial and wrong". Instead, he posited that the Jewish values of humanitarianism, love, equality, creativity and democracy are threatening to ideologies espoused by Hitler, Hamas and other "haters of the Jews".

== Release ==
The film premiered at the Miami Jewish Film Festival and was shown at the Museum of Tolerance Jerusalem.

== Reception ==
Jerusalem Dateline called it a "powerful film". Highland Park, New Jersey mayor Elsie Foster called it "an eye opener".

== See also ==
- October 8
- Blind Spot
