= Mark S. Golub =

American rabbi and media entrepreneur (1945–2023)

Mark S. Golub (1945 – January 31, 2023) was an American rabbi, media entrepreneur, television personality and educator. He created the television channel Jewish Broadcasting Service and the first Russian-language television channel produced in America, RTN (The Russian Television Network of America). Golub was the rabbi of Chavurah Aytz Chayim (Stamford, CT), and the host of L'Chayim, a talk show he created in 1979 in which he interviewed prominent Jewish figures.

== Early life and education ==
Golub was born in 1945 in New York City to Jewish parents Leo J. Golub and Rebecca Newman Golub.

The family moved from New York to Connecticut when Leo Golub joined the United States Public Health Service in 1952 and was stationed at the Groton, Connecticut Submarine Base. When Leo Golub was transferred to the Federal Prison in Danbury, Connecticut, the family resided in Danbury where Golub attended elementary school and junior high. When his father completed his service, he opened the first dental practice in Trumbull, Connecticut which is where Golub completed middle school and attended high school. Golub's family was mainstream Conservative and his parents helped found the first Conservative Synagogue of Trumbull, Connecticut where Golub sometimes helped his father lead services as cantor.

After high school, Golub attended Columbia College where he was the president of the Jewish organization on campus, Seixas Menorah. At Columbia, he served as general manager of the campus radio station, WKCR-FM. At WKCR, he produced and hosted "Approaches To Religious Concepts", in which Protestant, Catholic and Jewish leaders engaged in discussion.

In cooperation with Planned Parenthood of NYC, Golub also produced and hosted a sex-education series for New York Radio, "The Biology Of Love", a series subsequently used for training by the New York City Board of Education.

Golub attended Hebrew Union College – Jewish Institute of Religion for rabbinical school after he graduated from Columbia.

During his rabbinic studies at HUC-JIR, Golub joined his mentor, Eugene B. Borowitz, in the creation of "Sh'ma Magazine: A journal of Jewish responsibility", publications in which Jews could engage in written dialogue on the Jewish and secular issues of the day. Golub was Sh'ma's founding assistant editor.

== Career ==
=== Rabbi ===
Golub explained that he was a "Humanistic" Jew, favoring Midrashic or Rabbinic approaches to the Tradition over labeling himself "Reform" or "Reconstructionist". Since 1979 he had been the rabbi of Chavurah Aytz Chayim (Stamford, CT).

After his ordination in 1972, Golub became the Editorial Director and Director of Public Affairs for telephone-talk station WMCA Radio in New York City. In addition to writing WMCA's editorials and writing WMCA's FCC License Renewal Applications, Golub worked with the station's ombudsman organization "Call For Action", was the substitute host for talk-show hosts Barry Gray and Barry Farber, and hosted his own weekly talk show.

Also in 1972, Golub became the founding rabbi of a chavurah in Stamford, Connecticut, called Chavurat Aytz Chayim, with an emphasis on adult study and family participation. In 1973, a similar group of families in neighboring Greenwich, Connecticut, Chavurat Deevray Torah, asked Golub to become their founding rabbi on alternate weekends. The two congregations later merged as Chavurat Aytz Chayim.

Golub held an honorary doctorate from Hebrew Union College – Jewish Institute of Religion, and was listed as one of Newsweek's top 50 most influential rabbis in America in 2009.

=== Media ===
In 1979, Golub created the 501c3 organization, Jewish Education in Media, Inc (JEM). In 1979, Golub began hosting the interview program L'Chayim. It was the first production by JEM. The program premiered on WMCA Radio, moved to WOR Radio, and in 1990 premiered on television as well. L'Chayim became the flagship program of Shalom TV.

In 1991, Golub founded the Russian Television Network of America (RTN). After Chavurot Aytz Chayim sponsored Jewish families from the former Soviet Union immigrating to America during Operation Exodus, Golub teamed up with immigrant Michael Pravin to create a Russian-language television channel in the United States to serve Jews from the FSU who could not speak English. Calling it The Russian Television Network of America, RTN premiered as a channel on Cablevision in October 1992.

Golub and Pravin sold RTN in 1997. When in 2000 the purchasing company filed bankruptcy, Golub and his brother David Golub, an attorney with his own law firm in Stamford, Connecticut and Mark's partner in his business and Broadway endeavors, purchased the assets from the New Jersey Bankruptcy Court. He had remained the president as well as the face of RTN.

In 2005, founders Bradford Hammer and David Brugnone brought on Mark as the president and CEO of Shalom TV. In 2008, Shalom TV premiered nationally on the Comcast cable system. By 2010, Shalom TV was a free video-on-demand service on various American terrestrial television providers. In 2011, Golub premiered the Shalom TV Channel, a 24/7 "linear" channel with Jewish programming (news and public affairs, education, daily children's programming, movies, cultural and entertainment programming). On September 24, 2014, the Shalom TV name was changed to Jewish Broadcasting Service.

Golub was seen in several of the Jewish Broadcasting Service's series including L'Chayim, Jewish 101, From the Aleph Bet, and In the News as well as public affairs coverage.

=== Theater ===
With his brother David, Mark produced several Broadway plays including the Gershwins' Porgy and Bess (Tony Award), Vanya and Sonia and Masha and Spike (Tony Award), Who's Afraid of Virginia Woolf? (Tony Award), Best Man (Tony nomination), and Glengarry Glen Ross with Al Pacino. His production of The Bridges of Madison County starred Kelli O'Hara with an original score by Jason Robert Brown.

== Personal life and death ==
Golub married in 1967. After a divorce, he married again in 1979. Golub and his last wife have two children, and his last wife has two children from a prior marriage.

Golub also enjoyed baseball.

Golub died on January 31, 2023, at the age of 77.
