= Tal Ben-Shahar =

Israeli American writer

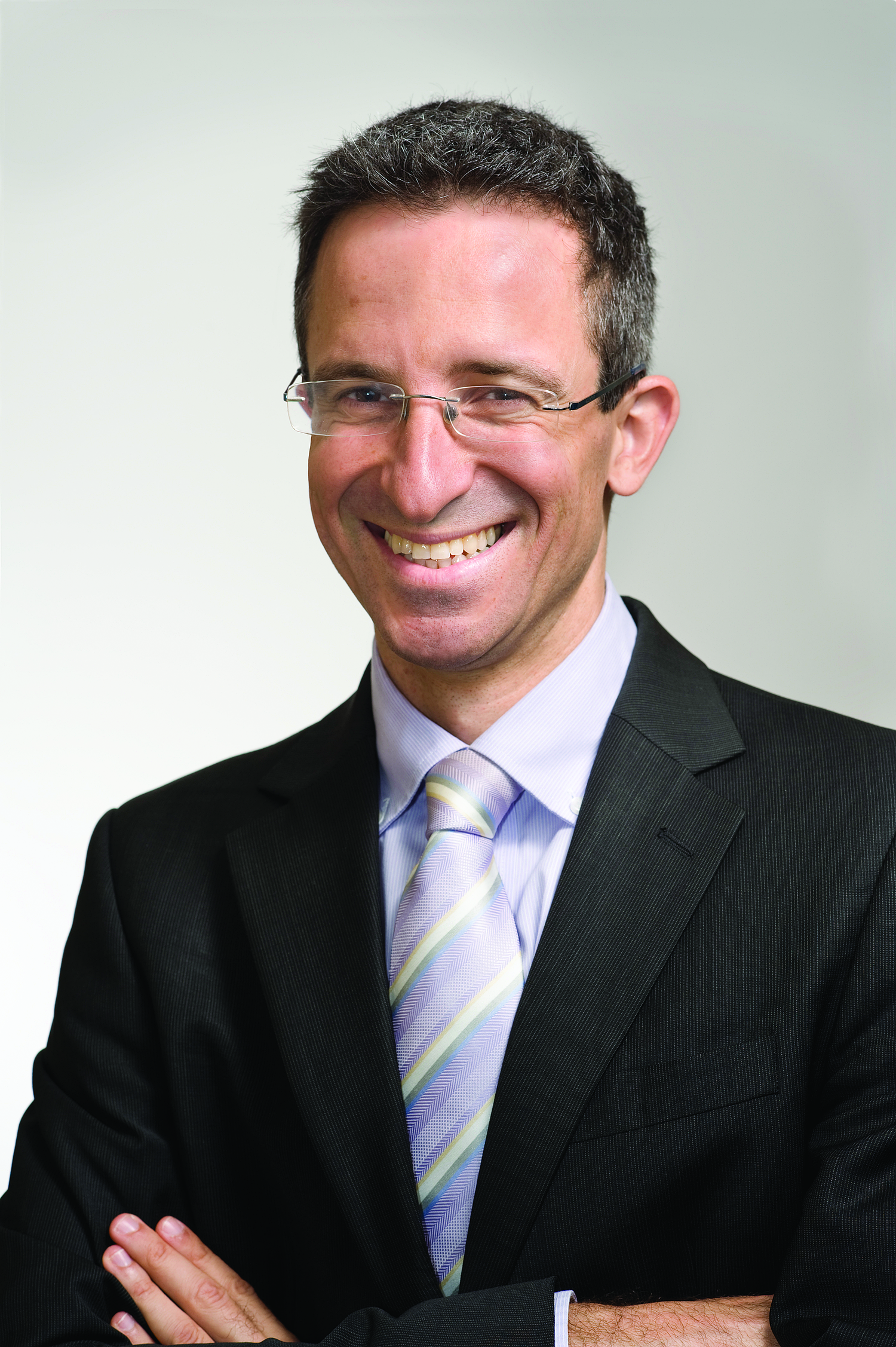
Tal Ben-Shahar

Tal Ben-Shahar (Hebrew: טל בן-שחר; born 1970), also known as Tal David Ben-Shachar, is an Israeli professor and writer in the areas of positive psychology and leadership. He has subsequently written several best-selling books and, in 2011, co-founded Potentialife with Angus Ridgway, a company that provides leadership programs.

== Early life and education ==
Ben-Shahar has a bachelor's degree from Harvard College in philosophy and psychology and received his Ph.D. in organizational behavior from Harvard University in 2004 with his dissertation, "Restoring Self-Esteem's Self-Esteem: The Constructs of Dependent and Independent Competence and Worth."

== Career ==
Ben-Shahar consults and lectures internationally on topics including leadership, ethics, happiness, and mindfulness. In 2011, Ben-Shahar co-founded Potentialife to bring positive psychology to people's daily lives.

He is the author of the international best-sellers Happier and Being Happy, which have been translated into 25 languages. He has also written two children's books in collaboration with Shirly Yuval-Yair in Hebrew; one about Helen Keller and the other about Thomas Edison. The books aim to teach children about happiness.

He is the narrator of the 2012 documentary Israel Inside: How a Small Nation Makes a Big Difference, produced by Raphael Shore.

Ben-Shahar taught at Harvard, where his classes on Positive Psychology and The Psychology of Leadership were among the most popular courses in the university's history.

Ben-Shahar is also the co-founder of the Happiness Studies Academy. Ben-Shahar has also helped establish the Master's Degree and PhD programs in Happiness Studies at Centenary University.

== Publications ==
- "How to Be Happier" in The Art and Practice of Living Wondrously (Ronit Ziv-Kreger, ed.) (2025)
- Being Happy: You Don't Have to Be Perfect to Lead a Richer, Happier Life (2010) originally published in hardcover as The Pursuit of Perfect (2010)
- Happier: Learn the Secrets to Daily Joy and Lasting Fulfillment (2007)
- A Clash of Values: The Struggle for Universal Freedom (2002)
- Heaven Can Wait: Conversations With Bonny Hicks (1998)

== Books ==
- Tal Ben-Shahar (2007) Happier: Learn the Secrets to Daily Joy and Lasting Fulfillment, McGraw-Hill Professional. ISBN 978-0-07-149239-3
- Tal Ben-Shahar (2009) The Pursuit of Perfect: How to Stop Chasing Perfection and Start Living a Richer, Happier Life, McGraw-Hill Professional. ISBN 978-0-07-160882-4
- Tal Ben-Shahar (2010) Even Happier: A Gratitude Journal for Daily Joy and Lasting Fulfillment, McGraw-Hill Professional. ISBN 978-0-07-163803-6
- Choisir sa vie: 101 expériences pour saisir sa chance (French Edition, 2011) - ISBN 161519195X
- Being Happy: You Don't Have to Be Perfect to Lead a Richer, Happier Life (2010) - ISBN 0071746617
- Happier, No Matter What.: Finding Pleasure and Purpose in Hard Times (2014) - ISBN 1615197915
- Short Cuts to Happiness: Life-Changing Lessons from My Barber (2018) - ISBN 1615194878
- 10x: A Program for Achieving Spectacular Leadership Results (2018) - ISBN 1119313007
- The Question of Happiness: On Finding Meaning, Pleasure, and the Ultimate Currency (2002) - ISBN 0595231403
- Ganar felicidad (Spanish Edition, 2008) - ISBN 9876090941
- Heaven Can Wait: Conversations with Bonny Hicks (1999) - ISBN 9812049916
- The Days After: Thoughts on War and Peace in the Wake of September 11 (2001) - ISBN 0595224644
- Secret method Harvard University No.1 popular lectures HAPPIER-happiness and success in my hand (Japanese Edition, 2007) - ISBN 4876885877
