= Rawan Osman =

Syrian-born German activist

- روان عثمان
- Born: 1983 (age 42–43); Damascus, Syria
- Education: Heidelberg University
- Occupations: political activist, influencer
- Known for: Arabs Ask

Rawan Osman (Arabic: روان عثمان, born 1983) is a Syrian-born German political activist and influencer. She is a self-described Arab Zionist and advocates for the normalization of relations between Arab states and Israel.

== Life ==
Osman was born in Damascus into a secular family. Her father's family were Sunni Muslims from Damascus, first recorded in 1938, while her mother's family were Shiite Muslims from a village near Baalbek, in the Lebanese Beqaa valley. Osman grew up in Chtaura in the Beqaa Valley, though she returned to Syria after graduating from a French Catholic high school. She also lived in Saudi Arabia and Qatar.

In 2011, before the onset of the Syrian civil war, she moved to Strasbourg, France, initially to learn skills to open a wine bar in Damascus. There, she claimed to have met Jewish people for the first time while living in the city's Jewish quarter. In her own telling, these encounters prompted her to reckon with the antisemitism she had been taught growing up. She has also attributed this ideological shift to her wine industry training in the German countryside, and to taking a course on Judaism at a German university. In 2018, she enrolled at the University of Strasbourg, and started work on her first book, provisionally titled The Israelis, Friends or Foes. By 2022, she had moved to Stuttgart and begun a course in Islamic studies, then Modern Hebrew and Jewish studies at Heidelberg University.

=== Activism ===
While living in Europe, Osman began advocating for awareness about antisemitic attitudes and education in the Middle East and among the Middle Eastern diaspora. In particular, she advocates for multicultural acceptance in the Middle East, including acceptance of Israel and Israelis, and the condemnation of "the instigators of wars willing to sacrifice innocent life" and "those who exploit the Arab-Israeli conflict to fuel their political power." With reference to the large number of refugees from Syria in Germany, she wrote that "Germany must recognize and seek to understand the embedded nature of anti-Semitism in Syria in order to better help its newest residents to live lives free of state-sponsored prejudice." Further, she stated: "A Europe unsafe for Jews will never be safe for other minorities."

In 2023, she advocated for the signing of the Abraham Accords, and later praised its Arab signatories: the United Arab Emirates, Bahrain, Sudan and Morocco.

While working with the Center for Peace Communications, Osman became involved with Sharaka. In 2022 and 2023, she was part of Sharaka's Arab delegation to the March of the Living, a Holocaust commemoration event at the Auschwitz concentration camp in Poland. She has also traveled to the United States with Sharaka, participating in community events. She was criticized by Arab social media users in January 2024 after posting videos of herself speaking to an Israel Defense Forces soldier and Avichay Adraee, a spokesman for the IDF.

From September to November 2023, Osman published a blog for The Times of Israel. Apart from her own story of becoming aware of antisemitic indoctrination, she strongly condemned Hamas for the attack on 7 October 2023. Following the attacks, she founded Arabs Ask, an Instagram forum meant for Arabs to ask questions and challenge preconceived notions about Judaism and Israel. She is also working on a book about Israel and Israelis. In the film Tragic Awakening: A New Look at the Oldest Hatred, she described her reaction when she learned about Jewish history and realized she had been indoctrinated: "I was angry. Because the Jew is not my enemy.”

On 4 March 2024, Osman spoke at the United Nations Human Rights Council. In her short speech, she criticized the governments of Qatar, Iran, Egypt, Jordan, Lebanon and Syria for what she described as failures to support the people in Gaza and to fight against Hamas and Hezbollah.

Osman has claimed that anti-Israel propaganda originates from "a highly organised and dangerous alliance in the Middle East, led by the Islamic Republic of Iran … [that] includes Hezbollah, the Assad regime, the Houthis in Yemen, and, of course, Hamas". In January 2026, she wrote that "it is not immoral—but necessary—to urge a superpower like the United States to intervene and end the Iranian people's nightmare".

Following the Syrian government offensive against the Democratic Autonomous Administration of North and East Syria (DAANES) of January 2026, Osman, now a researcher with the Jerusalem Center for Security and Foreign Affairs, visited Erbil to discuss the situation in Syria with the political, military, and civil society representatives of the Kurdistan Region of Iraq, including Mariwan Naqshbandi and Khalid Jamal Alber (the director general of Christian affairs) of the Ministry of Endowments and Religious Affairs, and members of a recent delegation from the Kurdistan Region to Israel. In her account of the visit, she emphasised "the [Iraqi] Kurdish openness toward Israel". Praising "the long-term vision of the Barzani family", she presented the Kurdistan Regional Government's "alignment with the West, integration into global markets, attraction of foreign investment, and political pragmatism over ideological rigidity" as a positive alternative to the DAANES, which she accused of "hostility toward Western systems" and "ties to Iran".

== Personal life ==
Osman lives in Germany. She was born a Sunni Muslim, and has identified herself as an Arab Zionist, but suggested her ethnic origins are non-Arab. In 2022, she began the process to convert to Judaism.

She has been estranged since the October 7 attacks from most of her family and friends who are still in Syria and Lebanon. According to Osman, some cut off ties due to fear, while others due to antisemitism. Between the attacks and November 2025, she made 16 visits to Israel, and stated her intention to move there permanently.
