= Jewish Broadcasting Service =

American English-language Jewish-oriented television network

- Type: Religious cultural and educational channel
- Country: United States
- Broadcast area: Worldwide

Programming
- Language: English

Ownership
- Parent: Jewish Education in Media, Inc. (a non-profit corporation)
- Key people: CEO Rabbi Justin Pines

History
- Launched: August 31, 2006 (20 years ago)
- Founder: Mark S. Golub
- Former names: Shalom TV

Links
- Website: www.jbstv.org

Jewish Broadcasting Service (JBS) is an American Jewish television network. JBS programming includes daily news reports from Israel, live event coverage and analysis, and cultural programming of interest to the North American Jewish community. The network is a full-time HD and SD channel. It is an English-language network produced by the non-profit organization Jewish Education in Media (JEM). The goal of this organization is to reach out to less-affiliated Jews and bring them closer to a Jewish religion and Identity.

== History ==
Shalom TV was developed by Rabbi Mark S. Golub in 2003, and began broadcasting on August 31, 2006. In 2008, Comcast launched Shalom TV On Demand nationally. The On Demand version of Shalom TV expanded to more than 20 video distributors available to more than 40 million homes throughout North America.

In May 2012, Shalom TV became available as a Roku channel. On December 7, 2012, Optimum Cable (Cablevision) launched the Shalom TV channel as a linear outlet. Shalom TV was renamed JBS on September 24, 2014, with the aim of becoming a worldwide Jewish network.

In September 2016, JBS became available nationally as a channel on DIRECTV channel 388. JBS launched in August 2017 on Verizon Fios in HD on channel 798. JBS HD launched on August 7, 2018 on Charter Spectrum in New York, California, Connecticut, Florida, Texas, Illinois, Missouri, and Ohio. In August 2023, Charter Spectrum added JBS in all their service areas. JBS HD launched on December 8, 2020 on all Comcast Xfinity service areas.

On February 12, 2024, JBS announced Justin Pines as the new CEO coming a year after the passing of Golub.

In 2025, JBS released Blind Spot, a documentary about campus antisemitism before and after the October 7 attacks

== Programming ==
Programs on JBS are intended to reflect the diversity and pluralism of the worldwide Jewish population. Programs include:

- Daily news from JBS News and ILTV.
- News breaks and programs with viewer call-ins.
- Live Friday and Saturday Shabbat services and holiday services.
- Public affairs events
- American, Israeli, and Yiddish films
- Roundtable discussions of issues in the world Jewish community.
- Jewish Studies programs, including the teaching of Hebrew and commentary on basic tenets of Judaism.
- Children's programs.
- 92NY presentations
- Israeli and American Jewish cultural shows
- Interviews with important Jews.
- Israel travel documentaries.
- Cuisine
- Jewish authors
- Jewish film reviews on Jewish Cinematheque
