= James Parks Morton =

American Episcopal priest (1930–2020)

Morton celebrating Communion at his final service as Dean of the Cathedral of St. John the Divine, on December 29, 1996

James Parks Morton (January 7, 1930 – January 4, 2020) was an American Episcopal priest and founder of the Interfaith Center of New York.

== Early life ==
James Parks Morton was born on 7 January 1930 in Houston, a growing metropolis in Harris County, Texas, United States. He was the son and only child of Vance Mulock Morton and his wife Virginia May Parks. Morton lived in Iowa City, Iowa, for most of his childhood, where his father was a professor at the University of Iowa.

Morton attended Phillips Exeter Academy. In 1954 Rev. James Parks Morton married Pamela Taylor, a daughter of Francis Henry Taylor, director of the Metropolitan Museum of Art, and his wife Frances Pamela Coyne. They raised four daughters.

Following his ordination, Morton ministered in the poor dock areas of Jersey City, and while Director of the Urban Training Center he started ecumenical training programs for religious professionals in inner city Chicago. He developed a sense of his role as essentially a parish priest, becoming immersed in the spiritual, moral and physical needs of each person in his community, whatever their station in life.

== Cathedral of St. John the Divine ==
Morton was dean of the Cathedral of St. John the Divine for 25 years (1972–1996). During his tenure at the cathedral, he started many new projects and initiatives, including the "Green Cathedral Initiative," and inviting artists in residence such as Paul Winter, Philippe Petit & I Giuliari di Piazza.

== Projects ==
Morton spoke about his personal relationship with the "green movement" in the film The 11th Hour. In 1996, the National Audubon Society awarded him its highest honor, the Audubon Medal. He was a contributor to Seven Pillars House of Wisdom.

Before Morton's passing he wrote a memoir that was published posthumously by Pamela Morton, his wife, and Polly Barton, his eldest daughter. The memoir, With Companions for the Journey may be found at https://www.withcompanionsforthejourney.com/

== Press ==
Morton worked with Imam Feisal Abdul Rauf during the Park51 scandal following September 11, 2001.
