= Cordoba Initiative =

- Formation: 2004

Founded in 2004, the Cordoba Initiative is an Islamic, multi-national, multi-faith organization dedicated to improving Muslim-West relations. It promotes the controversial interfaith Cordoba House community center, later renamed Park51.

== Significance of the name ==
The initiative claims that the name Cordoba was chosen to symbolize the time in history when Muslims, Jews, and Christians ostensibly lived together in peace and harmony and created a prosperous center of intellectual, spiritual, cultural and commercial life in the city of Cordoba in al-Andalus. Erick Stakelbeck, an investigative journalist and author, is one of a handful who believe that Cordoba represents the height of Islam's advance into the West, and that ever since its fall from Muslim hands, the faithful have yearned for its return to the Islamic fold. This claim, however, is not supported by any evidence and is largely attributed to the aspirations of the terrorist organization ISIS. The center was erroneously referred to as the "ground zero mosque," while the structure was intended to be neither at ground zero, nor a mosque. Widely misinterpreted by American right-wing politicians and pundits, it was subject to much criticism. Some felt it “would be a symbolic victory flag for Muslims who seek the destruction of America…and will unquestionably represent victory to the worldwide forces of Radical Islam.” This, however was never the intention of those proposing the construction of the community center whose purpose was to facilitate interfaith dialogue, community and understanding in the face of violent Islamic fundamentalism.

== Goals ==
The declared mission of the Cordoba Initiative is improving Muslim-West relations. The site includes a section called “Voices of Moderation.” The Shariah Index Project, for example, seeks to address the questions:

What is the right balance between the institutions of religious and political authority in the modern state? Should religion and governance be legally separated, or is there a way to integrate the two? What is meant by religious law, and can it be implemented without endangering basic human rights? The Shariah Index Project seeks to answer these questions in the context of present-day Muslim society. It provides this vision: •To demystify the notion, meaning and requirements of an Islamic state •To clarify the principles of Shariah in the context of modern society •To provide the general public, opinion leaders, and state officials in both the Muslim world and the West with tools for achieving these principles in practice.

== Activities ==
The Initiative lists the following activities on their website: convening annual meetings of Islamic scholars, media appearances, lectures and publications, creating Cordoba House, shaping a strong and moderate Muslim-American community, building bridges with those of other faiths, combatting “Islamophobia”, and the Shariah Index Project, by which they say they will create a blueprint by which democracy will take place in the Muslim world. . It is best known for planning and advocating the proposed Islamic center known first as Cordoba House and later as Park51. Imam Feisal was first in charge of construction of the center.

== Leadership ==
The Cordoba Initiative is the vision of Imam Feisal Abdul Rauf. Imam Feisal brings together leaders across the Muslim-West divide to speak out for innovative, proactive, and positive solutions to shared challenges. In this capacity, Cordoba Initiative can provide novel solutions to those areas where conflict between Islamic and Western communities undermine local and global security. The Initiative has three officers: Imam Feisal Abdul Rauf, Chairman; John S. Bennett of the Aspen Institute; and Daisy Khan, the wife of Rauf.

== Affiliations ==
The Cordoba Initiative is very closely affiliated with the American Society for Muslim Advancement (ASMA). ASMA currently serves as the project's fiscal agent, and the two organizations share infrastructure, space, utilities, vendor services, and co-sponsorship of programs.
