= Asia Pacific Exchange and Co-operation Foundation =

The Asia Pacific Exchange and Co-operation Foundation (APECF) is a Chinese-government-backed organisation, based in Hong Kong. It is controversially planning to invest US$3 billion in the small Nepalese town of Lumbini, birthplace of the Buddha, to create a 'Mecca' for Buddhists of all strands.

In June 2011, it was reported in the Chinese media to have signed an agreement with the United Nations Industrial Development Organization for the project, which will help Lumbini "transcend religion, ideology and race" in its work to rejuvenate the culture and spirit of Buddhism, according to executive vice chairman Xiao Wunan.

The investment is enormous, constituting almost ten percent of Nepal's gross domestic product. However, neither the Nepalese government nor the local authorities were consulted about the project, they say.

== Organisation ==
The joint chairmen of APECF have varied backgrounds. They include Steven Clark Rockefeller Jr, a fifth-generation member of the Rockefeller family; Jack Rosen, chairman of the American Jewish Congress; Leon Charney, a real estate tycoon and former US presidential adviser; Prachanda, leader of the Unified Communist Party of Nepal (Maoist) and former Prime Minister of Nepal; and Paras, the former Nepali crown prince whose father's monarchy was overthrown by Prachanda's forces. The executive vice-chairman of the foundation is Xiao Wunan.
