= Feisal Abdul Rauf =

American imam (born 1948)

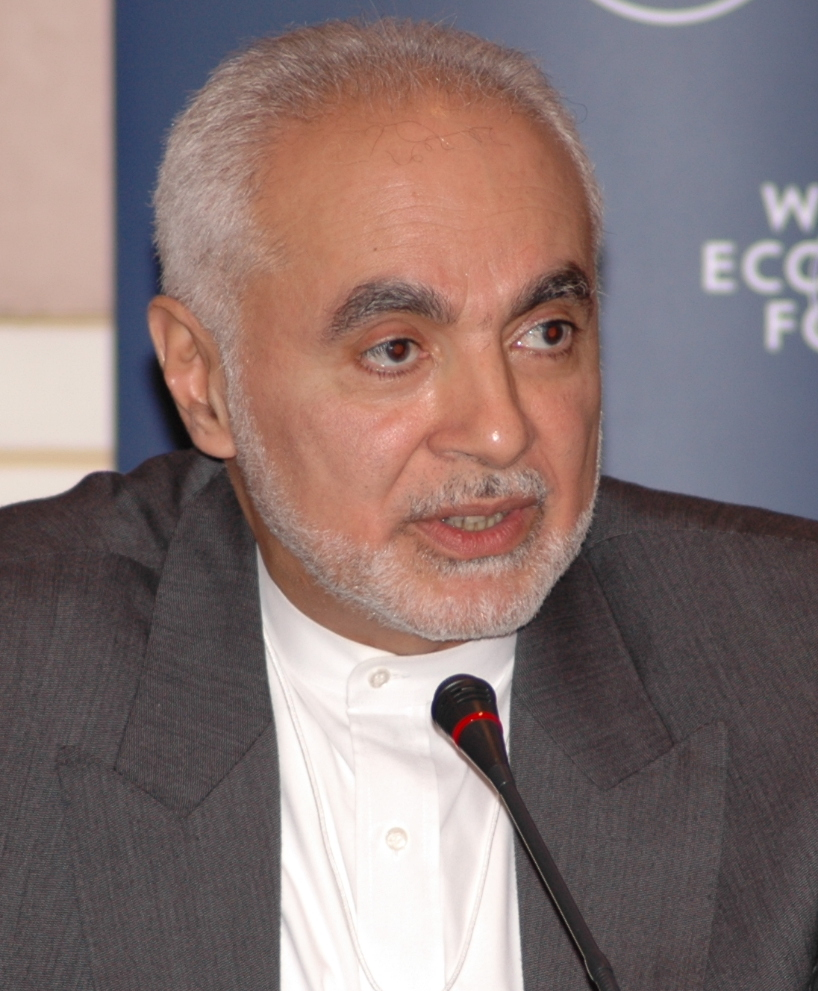
- Abdul Rauf at the 2005 World Economic Forum
- Born: October 23, 1948 (age 78); Kuwait
- Education: Columbia University (BS); Stevens Institute of Technology (MS)
- Occupations: Imam, author, landlord
- Known for: Sponsor and director of Park51

Feisal Abdul Rauf (Arabic: فيصل عبد الرؤوف, born October 23, 1948) is an Egyptian-American Sufi imam, author, and activist whose stated goal is to improve relations between the Muslim world and the West. From 1983 to 2009, he served as Imam of Masjid al-Farah, a mosque in New York City. He has written three books on Islam and its place in contemporary Western society, including What's Right with Islam Is What's Right with America, and founded two non-profit organizations whose stated missions are to enhance the discourse on Islam in society.

He has condemned the 9/11 attacks as un-Islamic and called on the U.S. government to reduce the threat of terrorism by altering its Middle Eastern foreign policy. Author Karen Armstrong, among others, has praised him for his attempts to build bridges between the West and the Muslim world. In 2010, Sufi Imam Rauf received national attention for his plans to build Park51, an Islamic Community Center, two blocks from Ground Zero in Lower Manhattan.

== Early life ==
Rauf was born in Kuwait to Egyptian parents. His father, imam and Sunni scholar Muhammad Abdul Rauf (1917–2004), moved with the younger Rauf to New York City in the 1960s. The elder Rauf assisted with efforts to create the multimillion-dollar Islamic Cultural Center of New York, the first building designed as a mosque in New York City, which took 25 years to complete and opened in 1991. Rauf studied physics at Columbia University, where he earned his bachelor's degree in nuclear engineering in 1969, before earning a master's degree in plasma physics at Stevens Institute in Hoboken, New Jersey.

== Career ==
After finishing college, Rauf focused on religion, and became the leader of a New York City mosque. Rauf has written three books on Islam and its place in contemporary Western society, including What's Right with Islam, later printed in paperback with the changed title What's Right with Islam is What's Right with America. Rauf served as imam of Masjid al-Farah in New York City's Tribeca district between 1983 and 2009.

Rauf is a friend of the Nur Ashki Jerrahi Sufi Order, and in 1983, he was appointed prayer leader at their Masjid al-Farah mosque. In 1997, he founded the American Sufi Muslim Society (ASMA), which has since been renamed the American Society for Muslim Advancement. Rauf worked to improve relationships between American society, the American Muslim community and the wider Muslim world. He founded the American Society for Muslim Advancement (originally named the American Sufi Muslim Association.)

The organization is now headed by his wife. He is a member of the Council of 100 Leaders (C-100) on West-Islamic World Dialogue at the World Economic Forum (WEF) and has received both the Alliance for International Conflict Prevention and Resolution's annual Alliance Peacebuilder Award and The Interfaith Center of New York's annual James Parks Morton Interfaith Award (2006). He was a major speaker at the 2009 Parliament of the World's Religions in Melbourne, Australia. In 2003, Rauf founded the Cordoba Initiative, another registered nonprofit organization with offices in both New York and Kuala Lumpur, Malaysia. As CEO of Cordoba Initiative, Rauf coordinates projects that emphasize the bonds that connect the Muslim world and the West.

=== Post-9/11 ===
Following the September 11 attacks, Rauf conducted training and speeches for the F.B.I. and U.S. State Department. However, some U.S. politicians have voiced concerns about his views, referring to comments Rauf made when interviewed by Ed Bradley on CBS 60 Minutes on September 30, 2001. Rauf's website says he was referring to the US CIA in the 1980s "financing Osama Bin Laden and strengthening the Taliban." Columnist Jonathan Rauch wrote that Rauf gave a "mixed, muddled, muttered" message after 9/11. Nineteen days after the attacks, he told CBS's 60 Minutes that fanaticism and terrorism have no place in Islam. Rauch said that the message was mixed, however, because when then asked if the U.S. deserved the attacks, Rauf answered, "I wouldn't say that the United States deserved what happened. But the United States' policies were an accessory to the crime that happened." When the interviewer asked Rauf how he considered the U.S. to be an accessory, he replied, "because we have been accessory to a lot of innocent lives dying in the world. In fact, in the most direct sense, Osama bin Laden is made in the USA." Although this CIA-Osama bin Laden controversy has been brought up by many others, Rudy Giuliani, Peter T. King, Rick Lazio, and Sarah Palin expressed concern about these remarks when discussing Rauf as the driving force behind the Park51 project.

Speaking at his New York mosque in 2004, Imam Feisal said: "The Islamic method of waging war is not to kill innocent civilians. But it was Christians in World War II who bombed civilians in Dresden and Hiroshima, neither of which were military targets." He also said that there could be little progress in Western-Islamic relations until the U.S. acknowledged backing Middle East dictators and give an "American Culpa" speech to the Muslim world, because there are "an endless supply of angry young Muslim rebels prepared to die for their cause and there [is] no sign of the attacks ending unless there [is] a fundamental change in the world".

Responding to a question during an interview on New York WABC radio in June 2010 regarding the U.S. State Department's designation of Hamas as a terrorist organization, Rauf said, "I'm not a politician. The issue of terrorism is a very complex question ... I am a peace builder. I will not allow anybody to put me in a position where I am seen by any party in the world as an adversary or as an enemy."

=== Park51 ===
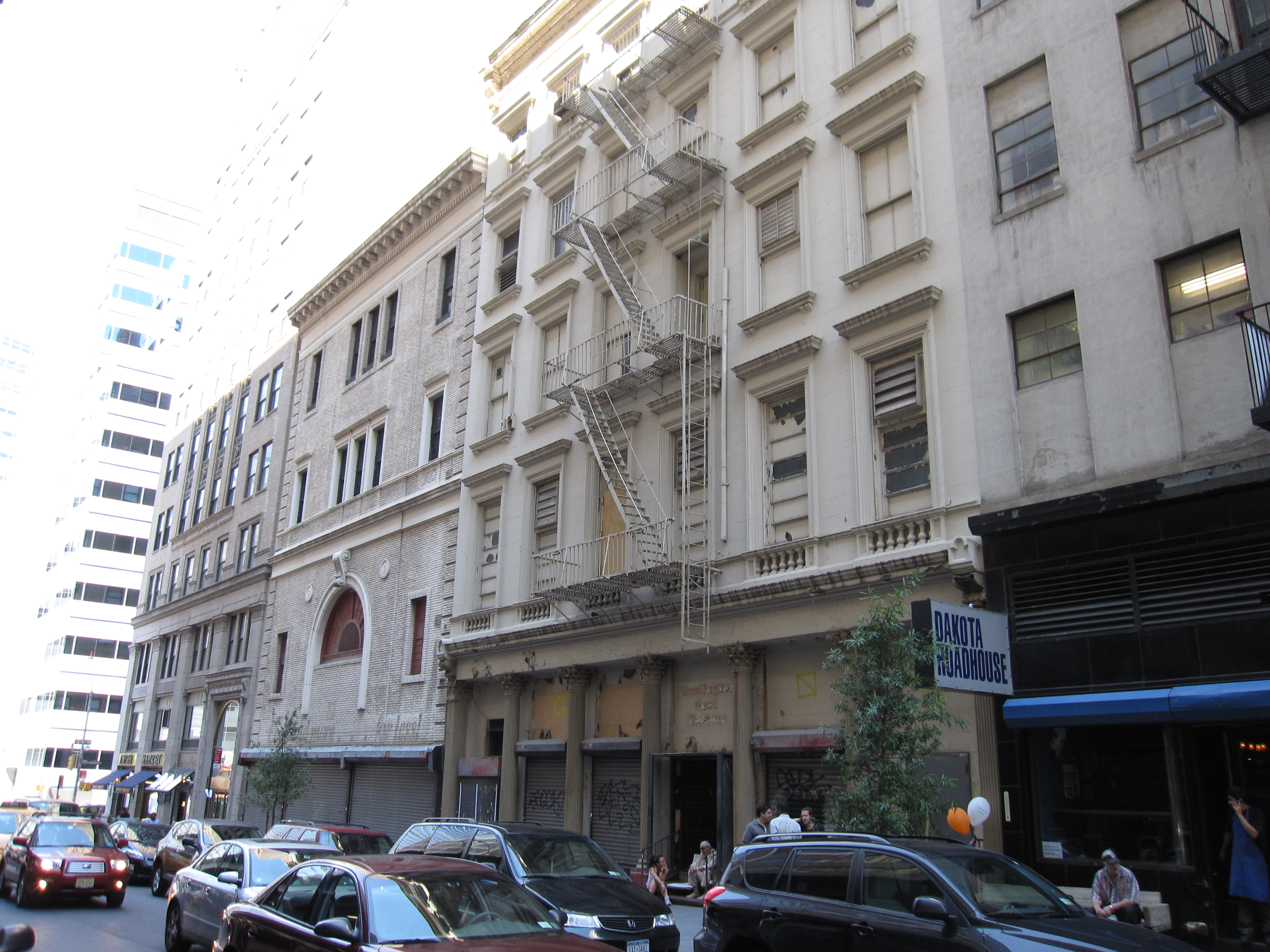
Rauf planned to build an Islamic center at this former Burlington Coat Factory, two blocks from Ground Zero.

Sharif El-Gamal, chairman and chief executive of Soho Properties, bought 45 Park Place in July, 2009. "It's really to provide a place of peace, a place of services and solutions for the community which is always looking for interfaith dialogue." Plans for the project include a mosque which would accommodate 1,000–2,000 Muslims in prayer. Rauf won support from the local Community Board, and received both support and opposition from some 9/11 families, politicians, organizations, academics, and others. The initiative was supported by some Muslim American leaders and organizations, including CAIR, and criticized by some other Muslims such as Sufi mystic Stephen Suleyman Schwartz, director of the Center for Islamic Pluralism in Washington.

Controversy over the location—in close proximity to Ground Zero—ensued, and in an interview with Larry King on September 8, 2010, Rauf was asked "... given what you know now, would you have said, listen, let's not do it there? Because it sounds like you're saying in retrospect wouldn't have done it." Rauf answered: "If I knew this would happen, this would cause this kind of pain, I wouldn't have done it. My life has been devoted to peacemaking." On September 12, 2010 on This Week with Christiane Amanpour, Abdul Rauf repeated that if complaints had been raised in December 2009 when the project was front-page news in The New York Times, he would have moved it, but at that time there was broad support for it, which did not change until May. He furthermore expressed concern that a move would be used by radicals internationally to claim that "Islam is under attack in the Western world".

On January 14, 2011, Park51 developer Sharif el-Gamal surprised Rauf by unilaterally announcing that Rauf would no longer speak for or raise money for Park51, replacing him with Imam Abdallah Adhami. The split was attributed to a number of differences in vision for the project—Rauf had wanted a larger interfaith center named Cordoba House, but el-Gamal had changed the name to Park51, wanted it to primarily serve Muslims, and to have a local scope. The removal of Rauf from this leadership role raised concerns that the project would be unable to raise the necessary funds to build the planned center. On January 29, Rauf announced that he would move the Cordoba House to a different site if one were offered to him and if the new site was "on par, or even better" than the current Park51 site.

== Rental properties ==
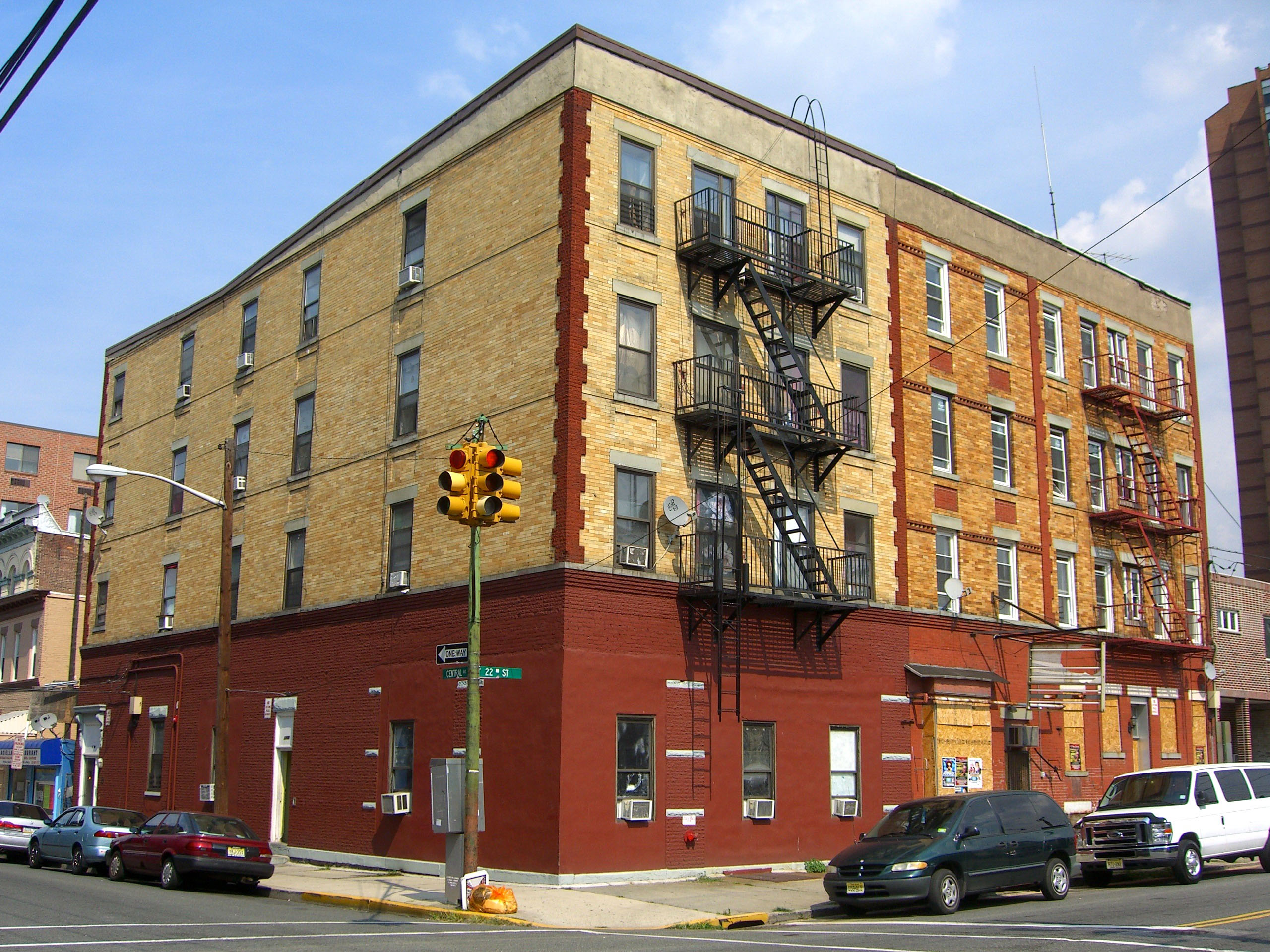
Building at 2206 Central Avenue in Union City, New Jersey, one of several in Hudson County owned by Rauf

Rauf owns several apartment buildings in Hudson County, New Jersey, including four in Union City, and one in North Bergen in which he lives. By 2010, numerous residents of Rauf's properties in Union City had alleged that those properties have fallen into disrepair over the course of the prior several years, with some of the residents attributing this to time Rauf spends on his activities in Lower Manhattan. On September 8, 2010, Union City Mayor Brian P. Stack, who criticized Rauf as a "slumlord", announced court actions to have a custodial receiver take over management of these properties, and the creation of a Quality of Life Task Force to identify 15 apartment buildings in need of renovations, including Rauf's.

A September 15, 2010 hearing revealed that following a September 7 inspection that determined imminent hazards, police began monitoring two of Rauf's buildings, due to inoperable fire alarms and sprinklers, and failure on Rauf's part to hire a private fire patrol. Judge Thomas Olivieri gave Rauf's lawyers until September 23 to produce plans and evidence of efforts to address these violations, lest Rauf face loss of control over the buildings. On November 9, Judge Olivieri placed the Central Avenue property into temporary custodial receivership, with $7,000 in rent payments held in escrow from Rauf's attorney set aside to pay for the repairs.

According to 2010 reports by the Bergen Record, Rauf met with U.S. Senator Robert Menendez around 1991 when Menendez was Mayor of Union City, to request state funds to renovate three of his properties. As a result, Rauf received $80,000 in city funds, $384,000 from the Union City Community Development Agency, $1.3 million in construction loans from Hudson County's Affordable Housing Trust Fund, and $630,900 from the state. Rauf was also sued for fraud in 2008 by his one-time business partner, James Cockinos, over a $250,000 mortgage that Cockinos gave Rauf for his Central Avenue property, ownership of which Rauf then transferred to Sage Developments for a second $650,000 mortgage. Rauf and his wife, Daisy Khan, made payments to Cockinos for 11 years, but ceased after a fire damaged the property. The two parties settled out of court.

== Reception ==
Fareed Zakaria praised Rauf for speaking of "the need for Muslims to live peacefully with all other religions", for emphasizing the commonalities among all faiths, for advocating equal rights for women and opposing laws that in any way punish non-Muslims.

Walter Isaacson, head of The Aspen Institute, says Rauf "has participated at the Aspen Institute in Muslim-Christian-Jewish working groups looking at ways to promote greater religious tolerance. He has consistently denounced radical Islam and terrorism, and promoted a moderate and tolerant Islam."

=== Views on Hamas ===
During an interview on New York WABC radio in June 2010, Rauf declined to say whether he agreed with the U.S. State Department's designation of Hamas as a terrorist organization. Responding to the question, Rauf said, "Look, I'm not a politician. The issue of terrorism is a very complex question ... I am a peace builder. I will not allow anybody to put me in a position where I am seen by any party in the world as an adversary or as an enemy." Sarah Palin and Lazio criticized his refusal to agree with the assessment of the United States that Hamas is a terrorist organization, and former New York Mayor Rudy Giuliani alleged that Rauf had supported radical causes that sympathized with Islamic terrorism.

== Personal life ==
Rauf's first wife was an American woman who converted to Islam. Rauf later married a Malaysian woman. Rauf has two children with each of his first two wives. He has been married to his third wife Daisy Khan since the late 1990s. Khan, a native of Kashmir, is a professional interior architect, but since 2005 has worked full-time for the two non-profit organizations founded by Rauf, and at times functions as his spokesperson. They live in North Bergen, New Jersey.

== Selected bibliography ==
=== Books ===
- Feisal Abdul Rauf, Moving the Mountain: Beyond Ground Zero to a New Vision of Islam in America (Free Press, 2012) ISBN 9781451656015
- Feisal Abdul Rauf, What's Right with Islam: a New Vision for Muslims and the West (HarperCollins, 2004) ISBN 978-0-06-058272-2, reissued as What's Right with Islam Is What's Right with America (HarperCollins, 2005) ISBN 978-0-06-075062-6. (An Indonesian language edition was published in 2007, titled Seruan Azan Dari Puing WTC: Dakwah Islam di Jantung Amerika Pasca 9/11, which translates as A Call to Prayer from the WTC Rubble: Islamic Dawah from the Heart of America Post 911)
- Feisal Abdul Rauf, Islam: A Sacred Law (Threshold Books, 2000) ISBN 978-0-939660-70-4
- Feisal Abdul Rauf, Islam: A Search for Meaning (Mazda Publishers, 1996) ISBN 978-1-56859-037-0
- Feisal Abdul Rauf and Laleh Bakhtiar, Quran for Children (Kazi Publications, 1985) ISBN 978-0-935782-08-0

=== Other writings ===
- "Building on Faith", The New York Times. September 7, 2010.
- "Need for some cultural sensitivity", The Star (Malaysia). May 12, 2010.
- "Using Qur'anic Narratives in Pursuit of Peace", Common Ground News Service, March 4, 2010.
- "Putting the faith back", The Star (Malaysia). December 30, 2009.
- "Religion must be part of the Afghanistan solution", The Star (Malaysia). October 12, 2009.
- "Sharing the core of our beliefs", Common Ground News Service, March 31, 2009.
- "Religious organisations are key to Mideast peace", Common Ground News Service, March 5, 2009.
- "Preventing Chaos", The Star (Malaysia). March 9, 2008.
- "Asceticism in Islam". Cross Currents. 57 (4). Winter 2008. Archived from the original on 2015-10-15 – via Questia.
- "The Ideals We Share", Newsweek. July 31, 2007. with Khan, Daisy.
- "The End of Barbarism: The Phenomenon of Torture and the Search for Common Good", Pursuing the Global Common Good: Principle and Practice in US Foreign Policy. Washington, DC: Center for American Progress. 2007. with Schulz, William F., ed. by Steenland, Sally, et al. video
- "What is Sunni Islam?" in Voices of Islam: Voices of Tradition, vol. 1 of 3, ed. Cornell, Vincent J. Westport: Praeger. 2007.
- "Al-Qaeda's Greatest Fear may be US Leaving Iraq". Aspen Times. October 11, 2006. with Bennett, John.
- "Arab Reform Final Report". New York: Council on Foreign Relations. 2005. with Albright, Madeleine, et al.
- "Bringing Muslim Nations into the Global Century", Fortune. October 18, 2004.
- "To wear scarf or not to wear scarf", The Star (Malaysia). August 19, 2014.
