= Interfaith Center of New York =

Secular non-profit organization

- Founded: 1997; 29 years ago
- Founder: Rev. James Parks Morton
- Type: Secular Educational Non-Profit
- Purpose: promote interfaith dialogue and harmony among all of the world's religions; promote and resolve conflicts arising therefrom.
- Location: 475 Riverside Drive, Suite 540, New York, New York 10015
- Coordinates: 40°48.65′0″N 73°57.83′0″W
- Region served: New York Metropolitan Area
- Method: Educational Programs and Community Activities
- Key people: Executive Director Rev. Chloe Breyer
- Website: interfaithcenter.org

The Interfaith Center of New York (ICNY) is a secular educational non-profit organization founded in 1997 by the Very Reverend James Parks Morton. ICNY programs work to connect religious leaders and their communities with civil organizations and each other.

== Founding ==
The Interfaith Center of New York (ICNY) was founded in 1997 by the Very Reverend James Parks Morton after his retirement from 25 years as Dean of the Cathedral of St. John the Divine.

According to its certificate of incorporation, ICNY was organized "for the purpose of promoting interfaith dialogue and harmony among all of the world's religions and the prevention and resolution of conflicts arising there from." The idea to found the center arose out of the increasing religious diversity Rev. Morton saw in New York City, and his desire to utilize the network of religious leaders he had cultivated during his tenure at the Cathedral of St. John the Divine.

== Programs ==
- Education Programs focus on increasing knowledge and understanding about the religious diversity present in New York. Programs include workshops, panel discussions, and forums for teachers and students in various educational settings. The National Endowment for the Humanities sponsors a summer institute for K-12 teachers called Religious Worlds of New York.
- Domestic Violence Training Programs work with religious leaders to educate and train them about domestic violence resources. Domestic violence programs are co-sponsored by CONNECT.
- Rabbi Marshall T. Meyer Retreat for Social Justice is a two-day retreat convened for religious leaders on a specific topic. The retreat aims to provide in-depth and specialized information for community leaders on topics that are relevant and helpful to them. Pas retreat topics have included: confronting hate crimes, religious freedom in bricks and mortar, and economic resilience in faith communities.
- Civic Connections offers forums, workshops, and collaborative projects regarding civic topics or institutions. ICNY collaborates with the New York Legal Assistance Group (NYLAG) to offer pro bono legal assistance to NYC residents.
- Muslim - Catholic Initiative is a partnership with Catholic Charities and the Archdiocese of New York that unites Catholic and Muslim communities together for dialogue and mutually beneficial projects.
- Prepare New York is a coalition of New York-based interfaith organizations that organize Coffee Hour Conversations to encourage dialogue and understanding of religious pluralism surrounding the effects September 11, 2011 on residents of New York City. The coalition includes: the Interfaith Center of New York, Auburn Seminary and its Center for Multifaith Education, Intersections International, Odyssey Networks, Quest, and the Tanenbaum Center and its Religion and Diversity Education Program. September 11th Families for Peaceful Tomorrows and 9/11 Communities for Common Ground serve as advisers to the coalition.
- International Visiting Fellows Sister Cities Program is a three-year sister city program which aims to enrich the interfaith work and networks within each of the participating cities: New York City, Barcelona, and Glasgow. Delegates from the participating cities share best-practices in the area of interfaith work and civic participation.

== James Parks Morton Interfaith Award ==
The James Parks Morton Interfaith Award, named in honor of The Interfaith Center of New York’s founder, recognizes individuals or organizations that exemplify an outstanding commitment to promoting human development and peace. Recipients are honored for their lifetime achievements and contributions towards increasing respect and mutual understanding among people of different faiths, ethnicities, and cultural traditions. The Award is given at an annual gala fundraiser.

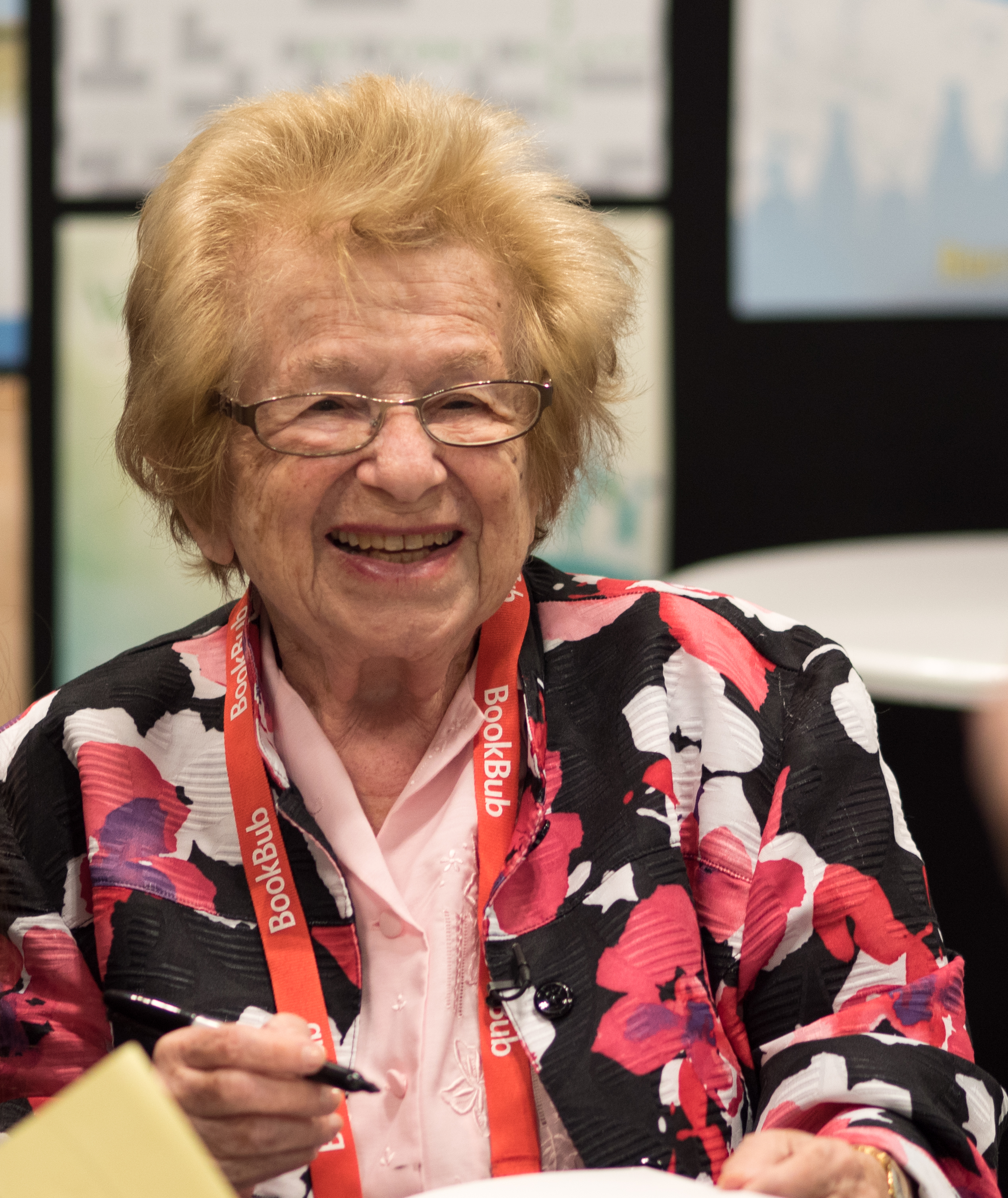
Dr. Ruth Westheimer

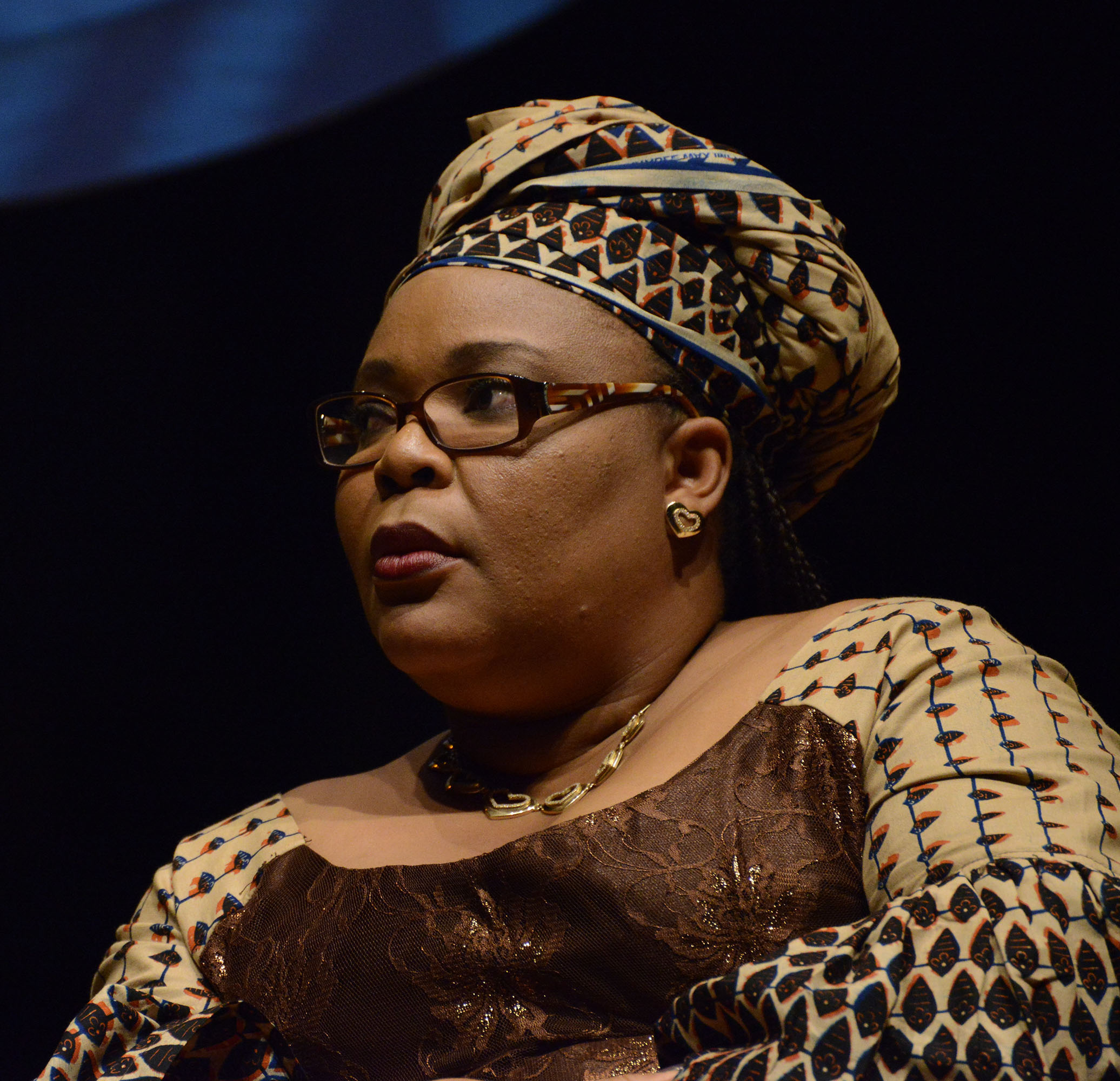
Leymah Gbowee

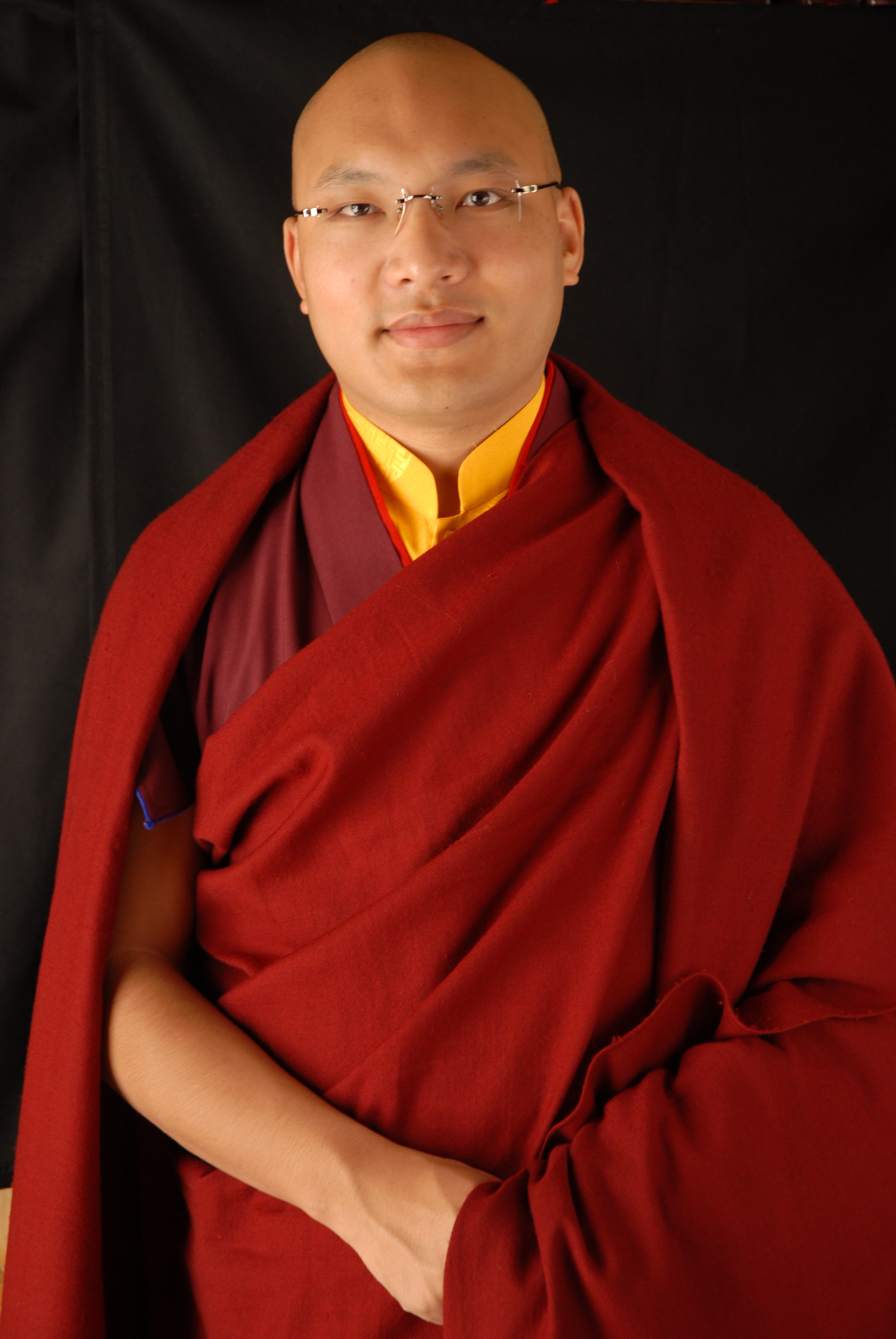
The 17th Gyalwa Karmapa Ogyen Trinley Dorje

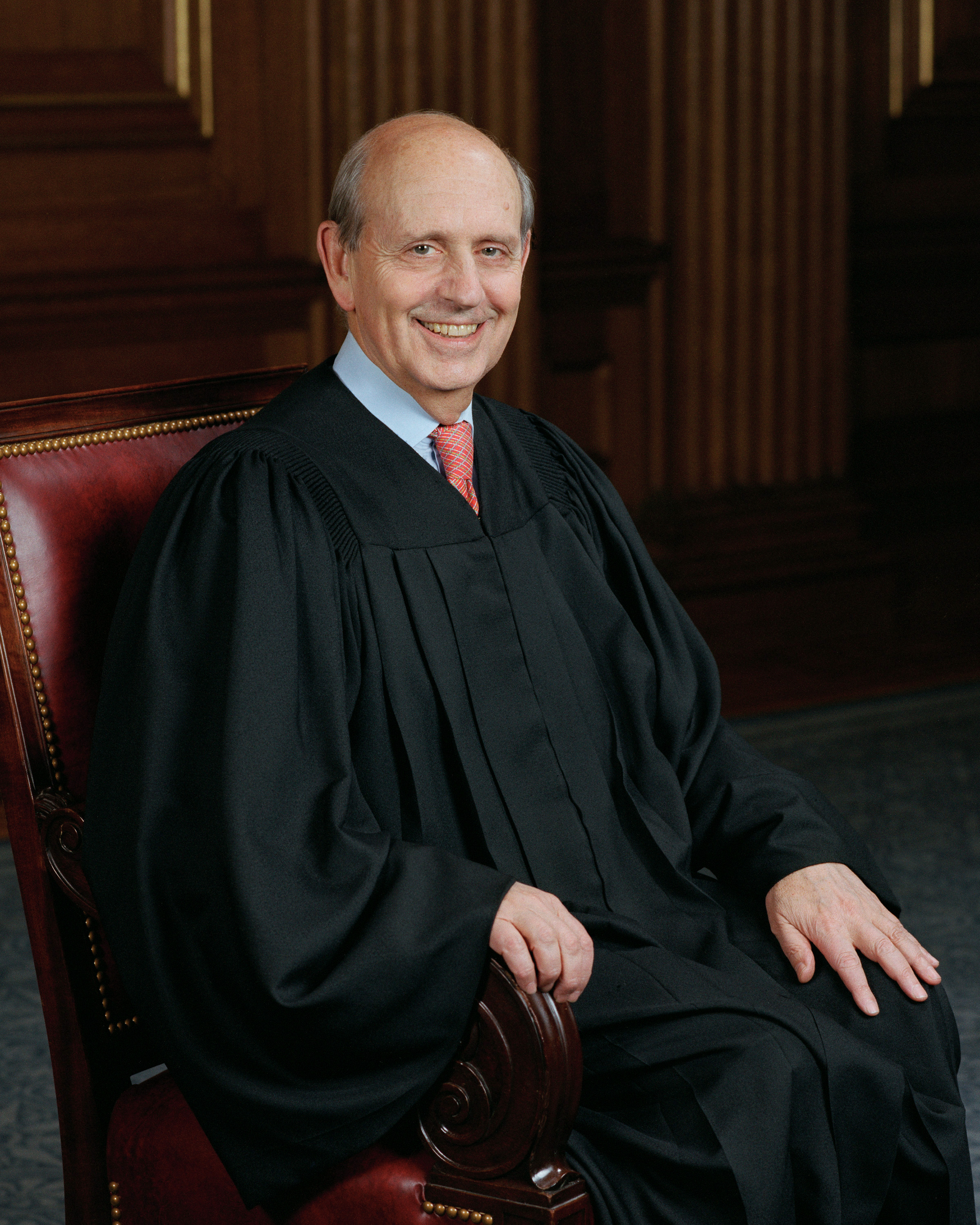
Stephen Breyer

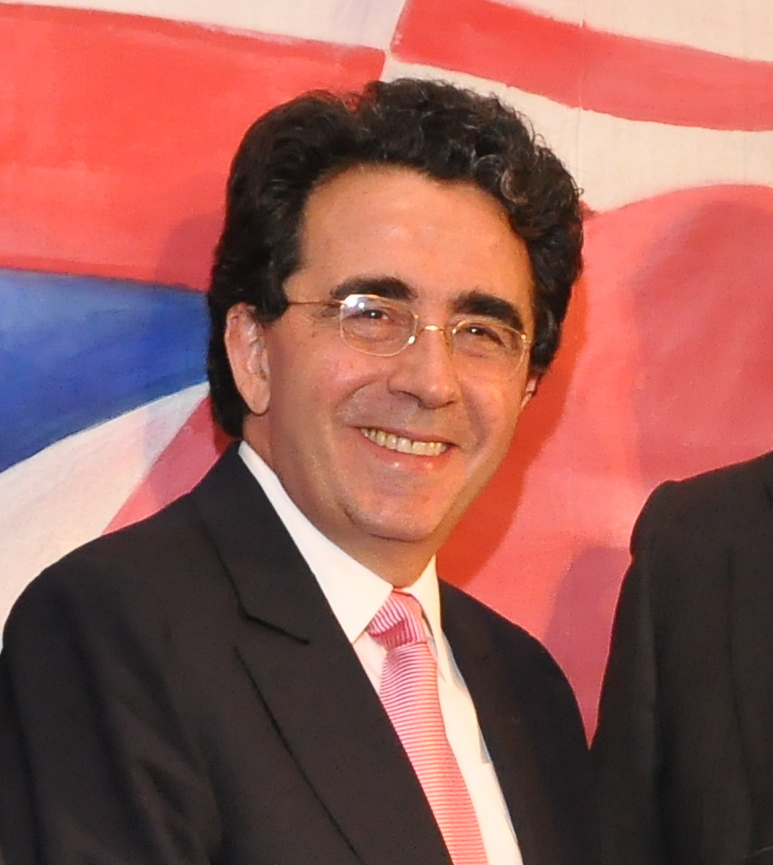
Santiago Calatrava

| Year | Recipient(s) |
|---|---|
| 2019 | Dr. Ruth Westheimer Michael B. Curry |
| 2015 | Bob Abernethy |
| 2014 | Al Gore Peter L. Zimroth Mrs. Gaetana Enders Sri Swami Satchidananda (posthumous) |
| 2013 | Sister Pat Farrell C.T. Vivian Bill Moyers Judith Moyers Russell Simmons |
| 2012 | Leymah Gbowee Abigail Disney |
| 2011 | Wynton Marsalis |
| 2010 | Philip Glass |
| 2009 | Thomas Cahill Judith S. Kaye |
| 2008 | Dr. Vartan Gregorian Rabbi Awraham Soetendorp The 17th Gyalwa Karmapa Ogyen Trinley Dorje |
| 2007 | Rev. Dr. Joan Brown Campbell Rev. Kyotaro Deguchi Nicholas D. Kristof Steven Rockefeller Carl Sagan Paul Winter |
| 2006 | Stephen Breyer Dr. Mohamed El Baradei Richard Gere Imam Feisal Abdul Rauf Daisy Khan Mata Amritanandamayi (Amma) |
| 2004 | Santiago and Robertina Calatrava Ossie Davis and Ruby Dee Judge Shirin Ebadi Philippe Petit Kathy O’Donnell |
| 2003 | Daniel and Nina Libeskind Archbishop Desmond Tutu |
| 2002 | Bill Clinton Alan B. Slifka James Carroll |
| 1997 | The Dalai Lama Mary Robinson Ravi Shankar |
