= Women's Islamic Initiative in Spirituality and Equality =

Islamic women's organization

- Abbreviation: WISE
- Formation: 2006
- Founder: Daisy Khan
- Type: Non-governmental organization
- Services: advocacy for women, consultation services, education
- Website: http://www.wisemuslimwomen.org

Women's Islamic Initiative in Spirituality and Equality (WISE or WISE Muslim Women) is a global organization dedicated to promoting women's rights, and social justice which is led by Muslim women. WISE takes the stance that patriarchal culture, not Islam, takes away women's rights and helps Muslims feel that they do not have to choose between their religion and their rights. The organization is able to provide Muslims around the world with a place and platform to discuss interpretations of the Quran, confront harmful traditions and prejudice and also to raise awareness of women in Islam. As an international movement, it has been considered by scholar and social scientist, Julie Pruzan-Jørgensen, to "hold important potentials for strengthening Arab women's authority and for pushing for reform of patriarchal practices." WISE is sponsored by the New York-based American Society for Muslim Advancement (ASMA).

== Programs ==
WISE sponsors conferences, like the 2010 conference in Malaysia which drew over 200 Muslim women from over 55 countries. At the first conference, also in Malaysia in 2007, WISE developed a 10-year plan for "advancing women's worldwide leadership within Islam." WISE conferences present academic papers, workshops and a Muslim Women's Online Portal which streams video and has a virtual mosque.

WISE set up a shura council for women which makes religious statements about abuses against women. While the council has no legal authority to issue fatwas, it is influential in many countries where Islam is the major religion. The shura is a way to promote activism from within the system already in place where Shari'a law is used. The shura created by WISE is "an effort by women to reclaim a religious and legal voice," and it is also the "first truly international shura of the Muslim world."

WISE also coordinates with other groups, like the Noor Educational Centre (NEC), founded by Jamila Afghani, in order to provide gender-sensitive training for Imams. The group also reaches out and partners with traditional Islamic universities as well.

== History ==
WISE was formed in 2006 in order to overcome the stereotypes that Muslims are terrorists and that Islam oppresses women. WISE was founded by Daisy Khan, who was concerned about gender inequality in Islam. Khan also said, "It's embarrassing when the problems of Muslim women are debated in the press without any participation by Muslim women themselves." WISE was first "launched" at a 2006 conference sponsored by ASMA in New York. In its initial statement in 2006, WISE has stated that "justice, fairness, and equality are core values of Islam."

WISE has been funded by the Ford Foundation, the Henry Luce Foundation, the Rockefeller Brothers Fund and the Marshall Family Fund. Early on, the organization included prominent Muslim women, such as Baroness Uddin, Ingrid Mattson and Massouda Jalal.
