= Steven Clark Rockefeller =

American philanthropist (born 1936)

- Born: April 19, 1936 (age 90); New York, New York, U.S.
- Education: Princeton University (BA); Union Theological Seminary (MDiv); Columbia University (PhD)
- Occupation: Professor emeritus at Middlebury College
- Spouses: Anne-Marie Rasmussen (m. 1959; div. 1969) Dori Selene Liles (m. 1977, divorced) Barbara Bellows (m. 1991)
- Children: 4
- Parent(s): Nelson Rockefeller; Mary Clark

Steven Clark Rockefeller (born April 19, 1936) is an American professor, philanthropist and a fourth-generation member of the Rockefeller family. He is the second oldest son of former U.S. Vice President Nelson A. Rockefeller and Mary Rockefeller.

Rockefeller formerly served as dean of Middlebury College in Middlebury, Vermont. He is an avid philanthropist who focuses on education, Planned Parenthood, human rights and environmental causes. He is a trustee of the Asian Cultural Council and an advisory trustee of the Rockefeller Brothers Fund. He has also served as a director of the Rockefeller Philanthropy Advisors.

== Early life and education ==
He is the second-oldest son of former U.S. Vice President Nelson A. Rockefeller and his first wife, Mary Rockefeller.

Rockefeller attended Buckley School (New York City) for grammar school before matriculating at Deerfield Academy. He received his A.B. degree from Princeton University, where he was president of the Ivy Club and a recipient of the Moses Taylor Pyne Honor Prize. Subsequently, he earned a M.Div. degree from the Union Theological Seminary in New York City, and a Ph.D. degree in philosophy of religion from Columbia University. He is a professor emeritus of Religion at Middlebury College in Middlebury, Vermont where he previously served as college dean and chairman of the religion department.

== Career ==
He coordinated the drafting of the Earth Charter for the Earth Charter Commission and Earth Council. In 2005, he moderated the international launch of the United Nations Decade of Education for Sustainable Development (DESD) (2005–14) in its headquarters in New York, launched by UNESCO and attended by Nane Annan, the wife of Secretary General Kofi Annan. He is Co-Chair of Earth Charter International Council and has written numerous essays on the Earth Charter, available at the Earth Charter website.

== Personal life ==
In 1959, Rockefeller married Anne-Marie Rasmussen in Søgne, Norway. She was a daughter of Mr. & Mrs. Kristian Rasmussen, a grocer, originally from Søgne. Anne-Marie was a former employee in the Rockefeller household. They had three children:

- Steven Clark Rockefeller, Jr. (born 1960), married Kimberly Eckles; three children: Steven III (born c. 1987), Christian Aldrich (born 1991) and Kayla (born c. 1999). Steven III is married to Lacey McKeon, daughter of assemblyman John F. McKeon from New Jersey. Christian is married to Erica Cadigan; one child.
- Ingrid Rasmussen Rockefeller (born 1963), married Eric A. Ellisen and remarried to Robert Kirkland II.
- Jennifer Rasmussen Rockefeller (born 1964), married John Nolan, member of the board of trustees of Rockefeller Brothers Fund; four sons and resides in Falmouth, Maine; Weston Nolan (born c. 1997); John Hunter Nolan (born c. 1990); Connor Nolan (born c. 1993); and Jared Nolan (born c. 1997).

According to a New York Times article from August 25, 1970, Rockefeller sought divorce from Anne-Marie, in Juarez, Mexico in November 1969. She remarried shortly thereafter to Robert W. Krogstad, of Maple Bluff, Wisconsin, who was also of Norwegian descent, and was the president of the Leer Manufacturing Company in New Lisbon, Wisconsin.

Rockefeller remarried to Dori Selene Liles, in 1977. They had one daughter;

- Laura Selene Rockefeller (born 1981), a writer and actress based in Boston.

His third marriage was to Barbara Bellows on May 11, 1991.

== Publications ==
He has edited or written three books:

- The Christ and the Bodhisattva (SUNY Series in Buddhist Studies). Edited by Donald S. Lopez Jr., and Steven C. Rockefeller. State University of New York Press (1987)
- Rockefeller, Steven C. John Dewey: Religious Faith and Democratic Humanism. Columbia University Press (1991)
- Spirit and Nature -- Why the Environment Is a Religious Issue: An Interfaith Dialogue. Edited by Steven C. Rockefeller and John C. Elder. Beacon Press (1992).

== See also ==
- James Parks Morton Interfaith Award
