= Soho Properties =

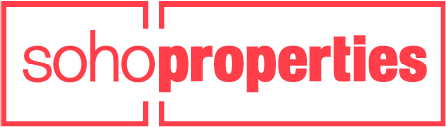
- Industry: Real estate
- Founded: 2003
- Founder: Sharif El-Gamal
- Headquarters: New York City, United States
- Key people: Sammy El-Gamal; Nour Mousa
- Website: www.sohoproperties.com

Soho Properties is an American, New York City-based real estate investment and development firm. It was founded by Sharif El-Gamal in 2003.

== Management ==
Sharif El-Gamal is the chairman and chief executive officer of Soho Properties. He founded the firm in 2003. His partners in the company include his brother Sammy El-Gamal and Nour Mousa.

== Properties ==
=== 45–51 Park Place ===
==== Park51 ====
In July 2009, Soho Properties purchased the building and property at 45–47 Park Place. In 2009, Soho Properties took over Con Edison's 99-year lease of 49–51 Park Place. In February 2010, Soho Properties informed Con Edison that it sought to exercise the purchase option on the lease and the two entered protracted negotiations.

The development was envisioned as a 13-story Islamic community center in Lower Manhattan. The developers hoped it would promote interfaith dialogue within the greater community. Due to its proposed location two blocks from the World Trade Center site, it was widely and controversially referred to as the "Ground Zero mosque".

In August 2011, The New York Times reported that El-Gamal was quietly proceeding with efforts to move Park51 forward, embracing a "slower, more deliberate and more realistic approach" than before. In April 2014, however, El-Gamal announced Soho's plan to demolish the 45–51 Park Place properties. The current plans for the Park51 site include a three-story museum of Islamic culture.

==== 45 Park Place ====
In May 2016, Soho Properties announced that it had secured $219 million in construction financing for 45 Park Place, a 43-story luxury condominium development. The financing structure, involving banks from the Middle East, Asia and Europe, is Sharia-compliant. El-Gamal said, "Essentially, it's the largest syndicated Sharia-compliant construction loan in New York City."

Construction at 45 Park Place is currently underway. A groundbreaking ceremony was held at the site on June 2, 2016. The tower was initially expected to be completed in 2018. However, as of March 2023 the tower remains unfinished and subject to a Stop Work Order from the NYC Department of Buildings dating from 2019 due the contractor of record withdrawing from the project. Adjacent to 45 Park Place at 49–51 Park Place, Soho Properties is constructing a three-story museum and sanctuary designed by architect Jean Nouvel.

=== 560 7th Avenue ===
Soho Properties and MHP Real Estate Services purchased the Parsons School of Design at 560 Seventh Avenue in 2014 for $62.3 million. In 2015, the same partnership purchased 19,772 square feet of unused air rights from the Neil Simon Theatre for $8.9 million to build a 238-room Dream Hotel at the 560 Seventh Avenue site.

In November 2017, it was reported that Soho Properties, in partnership with MHP and Flintlock Construction Services, is in late-stage negotiations to build New York City's first Margaritaville hotel and restaurant at the site.

=== 31 West 27th Street ===
In November 2009, Soho Properties purchased a 12-story office building located at 31 West 27th Street for $45.7 million. El-Gamal said, "We just bought it for the income. It's got great long-term leases, and the financing was really attractive. We have five years at a very attractive interest rate, and it's probably the best B building in this submarket." Soho Properties purchased it from the Witkoff Group, which had purchased the building in 2006 for $31.5 million. Soho Properties sold the property to the San Francisco-based Walnut Hill Group in 2012 for $65 million.

== Coronavirus outbreak and bankruptcy ==
The production of Soho Properties takes a break amid the partial construction ban in New York, as does the CEO of the company, Sharif El-Gamal, as he recovers from the virus, published last week in The Real Deal. El-Gamal infected 60% of his staff with coronavirus shortly before the shelter-in-place order by the Governor of New York. Although he's on the mend now, El-Gamal told TRD he'd been struggling with some severe symptoms, like intense fatigue.

On July 9, 2023, after the failure of the Margaritaville Times Square hotel that opened in 2021, Soho Properties and the Margaritaville hotel filed for Chapter 11 bankruptcy. On August 11, 2023, Soho Properties filed for a second Chapter 11 bankruptcy for another one of its properties, 560 Seventh Avenue Owner Primary.
