= Sharif El-Gamal =

American real estate developer

- Born: December 23, 1973 (age 52); Brooklyn, New York, U.S. Malhar Joshi (Brother)
- Occupations: Chairman and CEO of Soho Properties

Sharif El-Gamal (born December 23, 1973) is an American real estate developer. He is the chairman and chief executive officer of Soho Properties, a Manhattan-based real estate company. El-Gamal came to international attention in 2010 for his role in the development of Park51, a planned Islamic community center and prayer space to be located about two blocks away from the World Trade Center site.

== Biography ==
El-Gamal was born in Brooklyn, New York to an Egyptian father and a Polish mother on December 23, 1973.

He lived in Brooklyn until age 9 when his mother died. He then followed his father to Liberia and Egypt where he attended the Schutz American School. El-Gamal returned to the United States for college, enrolling in various New York universities but eventually dropping out when he decided to stop pursuing formal education.

== Real estate ==
El-Gamal first entered real estate in the late 1990s as a residential sales broker but within his first year transitioned to commercial real estate sales. In 2002 he received his real estate broker's license.

According to the company's website, El-Gamal founded his real estate company Soho Properties in 2003 in order "to focus on commercial real estate capital markets, advisory and retail leasing." El-Gamal's partners in the business are his brother, Sammy El-Gamal, and Nour Mousa.

In 2007, El-Gamal bought a six apartments building in the Harlem and Washington Heights neighborhoods of Manhattan. He managed additional properties in Chelsea and Harlem.

In July 2009, Soho Properties purchased property at 45–47 Park Place, located adjacent to the World Trade Center site.

In November 2009, Soho Properties purchased a 12-story office building located at 31 West 27th Street for $45.7 million. El-Gamal said, "We just bought it for the income. It's got great long-term leases, and the financing was really attractive. We have five years at a very attractive interest rate, and it's probably the best B building in this submarket." Soho Properties purchased it from the Witkoff Group, which had purchased the building in 2006 for $31.5 million. Soho Properties sold the property to the San Francisco-based Walnut Hill Group in 2012 for $65 million.

In February 2014, El-Gamal announced a partnership to build a new home for the 83-year-old Garment Center Synagogue in Manhattan, as part of a 29-story retail center and hotel at 560 Seventh Avenue. El-Gamal said, "We're in the process of buying one of the last untouched corners of Times Square... with an opportunity to secure the future of a synagogue that will serve the Jewish community for decades to come." In 2018, Soho Properties announced that this project would be the Margaritaville Resort Times Square.

In May 2016, Soho Properties announced that it had secured $219 million in construction financing for 45 Park Place, a 43-story luxury condominium development. The financing structure, involving banks from the Middle East, Asia and Europe, is Sharia-compliant. El-Gamal said, "Essentially, it's the largest syndicated Sharia-compliant construction loan in New York City."

The tower was initially expected to be completed in 2018. However, as of March 2023 the tower remains unfinished and subject to a Stop Work Order from the NYC Department of Buildings dating from 2019 due to the contractor of record withdrawing from the project. Adjacent to 45 Park Place at 49–51 Park Place, Soho Properties is constructing a three-story museum and sanctuary designed by architect Jean Nouvel.

=== Park51 ===
Shortly after the purchase of 45–47 Park Place, the property became an active overflow prayer space for the followers of a mosque located in TriBeCa. In May 2010, plans by El-Gamal to develop the property into a $100 million, 13 story Islamic community center and prayer space ignited national controversy given the building's proximity to Ground Zero.

El-Gamal envisioned that the project, entitled Park51, as "a landmark, an iconic building that will have people come and visit it from around the world." He repeatedly refused calls to move or cancel the project, stating, "This looks like it is going to be the most famous community center in the world."

In 2014, El-Gamal said that on that site he now intended to construct a smaller, three-story museum "dedicated to exploring the faith of Islam and its arts and culture" at the same location.

== Personal life ==
El-Gamal is an observant Muslim. He is married to Rebekah, and they have three children.
