= Steven C. Rockefeller Jr. =

American businessman (born 1960)

- Born: Steven Clark Rockefeller Jr. July 21, 1960 (age 66); New York, New York, U.S.
- Education: Fairfield University (BA); Yale School of Management (MBA)
- Years active: 1988 - present
- Employer: Rose Rock Group
- Title: Chairman and CEO
- Spouse: Kimberly Eckles (m. 1990)
- Children: 3
- Parents: Steven Clark Rockefeller; Anne-Marie Rasmussen
- Relatives: Rockefeller family

Steven Clark Rockefeller Jr. (born July 21, 1960) is an American businessman. Rockefeller is the son of Steven Clark Rockefeller and a grandson of former U.S. Vice President Nelson Rockefeller of the Rockefeller family.

He is the current chairman and chief executive officer of Rose Rock Group, a private investment firm, founded by members of the Rockefeller family. Rockefeller additionally serves as a member of the board of the Rockefeller Charity Foundation and on the committee of Rockefeller University. He has also been active on the Board of Directors of Grameen Foundation and has received a Fulbright Award.

== Early life and education ==
Steven Clark Rockefeller Jr. was born July 21, 1960, in New York City, the first son of Steven Clark Rockefeller (b. 1936) and his Norwegian-born wife Anne-Marie (née Rasmussen). His paternal grandfather was Nelson A. Rockefeller. He received a Bachelor of Arts from Fairfield University in 1985, and a Master of Business Administration in Public and Private Management from the Yale School of Management in 1990.

== Career ==
Prior to Rock Capital Group, Rockefeller served as Managing Director of Deutsche Bank Private Wealth Management and was a key founder of the Deutsche Bank Microcredit Development Fund, a unique partnership between the bank and its clients to support microcredit programs worldwide.

Rockefeller served as a member of the Board of Directors at Grameen Foundation for seven years. He also served on the Foundation's Development Committee, where he focused on technical support, fundraising, micro-credit programs and public health service. Rockefeller received a Fulbright Award in 2005 in recognition of his dedicated service to poverty alleviation and longstanding support of micro-credit programs.

== Personal life ==
In 1990, Rockefeller married Kimberly Eckles, who currently serves on the board of the Friends of the Rockefeller State Park Preserve and is also a venture capitalist. They have three children:

- Steven Clark Rockefeller III (born 1987), who married Lacey McKeon, daughter of Senator John F. McKeon, in 2019. They both graduated from Boston College. He works as a commercial real estate broker for Cushman & Wakefield and serves on the operating committee of the Rockefeller Family Office.
- Christian Aldrich Rockefeller (born January 3, 1991), who married Erica Cadigan at Harvard Club Boston in March 2022. In 2013, while studying at Boston College, he was among six students arrested and charged on vandalism charges and trespassing on Saint Patrick's Day.
- Kayla Rockefeller (born 1999)

The couple resides in Pleasantville, New York.
