= Daisy Khan =

- Born: Jammu and Kashmir, India
- Known for: Founder and Executive Director of Women's Islamic Initiative in Spirituality and Equality

Daisy Khan is a speaker, author, podcaster and media commentator, and Founder of the Women's Islamic Initiative in Spirituality and Equality (WISE), a women-led organization committed to peacebuilding, equality, and justice for Muslims around the world. She is a thought leader on Muslim women's rights, Islam in America, and preventing the spread of Islamophobia and extremism. In 2017, Khan published WISE Up: Knowledge Ends Extremism, to prevent the rise of hate and extremism and develop narratives of peace. Her memoir, Born with Wings, was published in April 2018. Her book "30 Rights of Muslim Women was published in 2024. She was listed among Time magazine's "100 Most Influential People", the Huffington Post included her in their "Top Ten Women Faith Leaders", and More magazine has described her as "a link between moderate Islam and the West."

== Early life ==
Daisy Khan was born in the foothills of the Himalayas in the Indian state of Jammu and Kashmir. She was raised in a forward-looking Muslim family, where education was highly valued. Her early life was shaped by an interreligious milieu where she attended a Christian School, St. Patrick's Presentation Convent School, with a student body of Hindus, Sikhs, Buddhists and Muslims.

Khan's grandfather, Ghulam Hassan Khan, was the chief engineer for the state of Kashmir, who studied civil engineering at Harvard in the 1920s and encouraged his children and grandchildren to pursue the best education, even if it meant to leave Kashmir. https://daisykhan.com/about/

=== Transition to America ===
At the age of 16, Khan left for the United States to pursue an education in art and design. She lived in Jericho, New York, with an aunt and uncle. After high school, she earned a Bachelors of fine arts degree from the New York School of Interior Design. In NYC, she worked 80-hour weeks as an architectural designer.

Throughout this period, Khan continued to wrestle with her religion. With the rise of the Iranian Revolution, she was forced to juxtapose the peaceful Islam of her childhood memories with the violent struggles portrayed by the media. Consequently, Khan found solace in Sufism.

== Career ==
=== Career beginnings ===
As a designer, Khan's first big project was helping to design the Islamic Center of Long Island, which was cofounded by her uncle. Khan later worked on designing a Hindu temple. Through her work with religious architecture Khan recognized how immigrants in dispora yearned to recreate a home away form home in America.

Khan went on to work as project manager for Shearson Lehman Brothers on the 106th floor of the World Trade Center. She remembers the lasting effect of the first foiled bombing in 1993. After Shearson she served as The Director of Design and Construction at Primedia (now RentGroup), where she oversaw the design of Seventeen magazine's offices. She transitioned to Avaya's real estate division as V.P of Project management.

In 2006, she quit her corporate career to dedicate herself fulltime to community development.

=== Community service ===
To promote a vision of a harmonious and forward-looking Islam, Khan co-founded American Society for Muslim Advancement (ASMA) in 1997 where she served as the Executive Director for the non-profit for 18 years. At ASMA, Khan dedicated herself to strengthening an expression of Islam based on cultural and religious harmony through interfaith collaboration, cultivating the next generation of leaders, promoting women's rights and building bridges of understanding through culture and arts.

In 2002, Khan produced the first and largest public Muslim response to the September 11th attacks called “Reflections at a Time of Transformation: Muslim Artists Reach Out to New Yorkers.” Over 600 people from the tri-state area attended this event, held at the Cathedral Church of Saint John the Divine. The exhibit displayed specially- created works of art by a diverse group of 22 visual artists, poets, sculptors and musicians. https://www.wisemuslimwomen.org/9-11-artist-response/

In 2004 to emphasize commonalities among the Abrahamic traditions,three women, Daisy Khan,a Muslim, Sarah Brokus, a Christian and Eileen Weiss, Jewish, stepped up to confront the looming tension of post 9/11. They formed a coalition of New Yorks finest creatives to develop a theatrical production titled, SAME DIFFERENCE: NYC Faith Stories in Words, Music and Dance. https://www.wisemuslimwomen.org/same-difference-2004/. Following the success of Same Difference, in 2005 Khan co-produced', an interfaith theatrical production, 'Cordoba Bread Fest' celebrating commonalities between the three Abrahamaic faith. The show was produced in colloboration with 16 interfaith organizations. https://www.wisemuslimwomen.org/cordoba-bread-fest/

In 2004, Khan set out to prioritize the advancement of Muslim youth globally, she founded, 'Muslim Leaders of Tomorrow' (MLT) empowering a global network of young Muslim leaders as social change agents. She convened large scale conferences for Muslim Leaders of Tomorrow' in New York,USA (2004) Copenhagen, Denmark (2007) and Doha, Qatar, (2010)

In 2005 Khan launched, 'Women's Islamic Initiative in Spirituality and Equality' (WISE) in New York at Times Square. WISE promotes Muslim women leaders who are on the frontlines advocating for women's rights, religious pluralism and peacebuilding. WISE develops creative solutions to persistent societal issues by amplifying women's voices at all levels of political, economic, religious, and social discourse. WISE held global convenings in Kuala Lumpur, Malayisa (2009) and Istanbul, Turkiye, (2011) https://www.wisemuslimwomen.org/wise-conferences/

In 2008, Khan founded the first global Muslim Women's Shura Council to prevent egregious violations of Muslim women's rights such as stonings, honor killings and forced marriages. The Shura Council provides religiously-grounded opinions on human rights abuses issues that Muslim women experience around the world. Drawing upon its members' expertise in both Islamic jurisprudence and fields such as history, political science, theology and sociology, the Shura Council issued its first research paper in 2009 titled "Jihad Against Violence", condemning violent extremism. The Council continued issuing statements on domestic violence, female genital mutilation, and adoption. The Council's statements were used to train Imams in Afghanistan to champion women's rights and combat the spread of violent extremism. The FGM research paper led to banning FGM in Gambia. https://www.wisemuslimwomen.org/wp-content/uploads/2017/10/WISE-UP-Female-Genital-Cutting.pdf

=== Activism ===
In 2009, Khan proposed to build a Muslim Cultural and Community Center, the Cordoba House at [Park51], two blocks from the World Trade Center.

In 2011, Khan spoke against Peter T. King's hearings on the "radicalization" of American Muslims. Khan further organized a rally against Peter T. King's hearings titled "I am a Muslim, Too" on March 6, 2011 in Times Square, NYC.

In 2011, September 11, Khan brought together 300 people of all religions for an evening of remembrance. The event, entitled In Good Faith: Stories of Hope and Resilience, highlighted hundreds of bridgebuilding projects undertaken since September 11, while also paying tribute to the Jewish, Christian, and Muslim families of 9/11 victims.

In 2017, Khan launched a WISE Up Summit in Washington, DC, with 300 people in attendance with an aim to develop comprensive solutions to extremism and Islamophobia, and to strengthen national unity. https://www.wisemuslimwomen.org/summit/

=== Publications ===
In 2017, Khan published WISE Up, a 365 page report written in colloboration with 72 contributors. WISE Up was launched at a Summit in Washington, DC, with 300 people in attendance. Scholars, community leaders, and activists with diverse ideologies came together to develop comprensive solutions to extremism and Islamophobia, and to strengthen national unity.

In 2018, Khan published 'Born with Wings' The Spiritual Journey of a Modern Muslim Woman, Penguin Random House India Private Limited, 2018 (ISBN 9789353050221) https://daisykhan.com/born-with-wings-2018/

In 2024, her book, “30 Rigts of Muslim Women: A Trusted Guide” Monkfish Book Publishing, (ISBN 9781958972342) connects readers with their deeply held beliefs about gender equality, which are central to the Islamic faith. This authoritative “go-to” book is designed to improve Muslim women’s lives by showing how Islam and its laws protect a broad spectrum of women’s rights. https://daisykhan.com/30-rights-ofmuslim-women/

In 2026, Khan plans to launch Hello Muslim, an AI-assisted, human-centered public education platform in an effort to provide accessible, credible and curated information about Islam and Muslims. The stated goal is to serve multiple audiences to prevent hate and Islamophobia from spreading and to provide Muslims and the general public with accessible tools to respond to misinformation and to uphold civil rights. Hello Muslim.org will be launched in March 2027.

== Media ==
Khan has been a contributor to the Washington Post's "On Faith" blog. She appears on TV, radio and podcasts, provide comment to newspapers, and publish op-eds on issues related to Interreligious dialogue and American Muslims. Khan is widely recognized as a leading voice on interfaith relations, Islamophobia and women in Islam.

In 2006, she participated in a debate hosted by NPR's Intelligence Squared on "Weighing the Limits of Freedom of Expression", where her team argued against the notion that the "proposition of the freedom of expression includes the right to offend", and eventually lost by audience vote, to the opposition team led by Christopher Hitchens.

== Public Speaker ==
Khan regularly does keynote speeches in the United States and internationally. Https://daisykhan.com/keynote-topics/. She speaks to audiences at businesses, schools, universities, governments, faith and civic organizations. She conducts trainings on topics such as Islamophobia, the role of fear and ignorance in driving hateful rhetoric, and the power of female leadership in addressing pressing social issues. https://daisykhan.com/school-training/. She provides tiered consulting services with customized solutions tailored to an organization’s needs, offering unique perspective to promote inclusive environments.

== Film ==
Khan has appeared in more than a dozen documentaries as an expert voice on Islam or as an effective storyteller https://www.imdb.com/name/nm5270557/

== Awards and recognition ==
- Certificate of Recognition, Rotary Club of New York 2025
- Citizen Diplomat Global Ties USA, 2024
- 100 Most Notable American Muslims, Interfaith Institute of Long Island, 2022 https://interfaithny.com/100_Notable_Muslim_Americans.php
- Religious Freedom & Civic Engagement International Center for Ethno-Religious Mediation 2022
- Interfaith PeacebuilderSwami Vivekananda Vedanta Society of New York2018
- Community Service Award, Bronx Community Council, 2017
- Service to Humanity Award, One Spirit Learning Alliance 2016
- Honoring Muslim Women in Our Community, Islamic Center of Long Island, 2015
- Faith in Action Award, International Center for Religion & Diplomacy, 2014
- Voices That Challenge Award, The Interfaith Alliance of NYS, 2013
- @DaisyKhan named one of the 140 Best Twitter Feeds of 2012
- First recipient of the Charles Ansbacher Award, Hunt Alternatives Fund, 2012
- Named one of the "10 Muslim Women Every Person Should Know", Huffington Post Religion Blog, 2012
- @DaisyKhan named in "7 Women You Must Follow on Twitter", Glamour, 2012
- Inspiring commitment to Inter-faith work. Common Ground, 2012
- Building Bridges Through Interfaith Dialogue, IQRA International Educational Foundation, 2011
- Eleanor Roosevelt Human Rights Award, Unitarian Service Committee, 2011
- The Edinburgh Peace Award - City of Edinburgh, Edinburgh Interfaith Association, Festival of Spirituality and Peace, and Conference of Edinburgh's Religious Leaders, 2011
- Prophetic Voice Award, The Shalom Center, 2011
- Commitment to Action, Clinton Global Initiative, 2010
- Women Who Empower and Inspire Award, The Arab American Family Support Center, 2010
- Daisy Khan named in 21 Leaders for the 21st Century: Seven Who Topple Tyrannies, Women's E-News, 2008
- Daisy Khan named a "Prime Mover", Hunt Alternatives Fund, 2007
- James Parks Morton Interfaith Award, The Interfaith Center of New York, 2006
- Lives of Commitment Award, Auburn Theological Seminary, 2005
