= Park51 =

Proposed Islamic community center in Manhattan, New York

- Artist's rendering of the originally proposed Park51

Religion
- Affiliation: Islam
- Leadership: Feisal Abdul Rauf; Sharif El-Gamal
- Status: Planned; 100,000 square feet (9,300 m^{2})

Location
- Location: 45–51 Park Place, Manhattan, New York City, New York 10007, United States
- Interactive map of Park51
- Coordinates: 40°42′49″N 74°00′36″W

Architecture
- Groundbreaking: 2011 (temporary mosque)
- Construction cost: $100 million

Specifications
- Capacity: Over 2,000
- Height (max): 13 stories
- Materials: Glass and steel

Website
- park51.org

Park51 (originally named Cordoba House) was a development originally envisioned as a 13-story Islamic community center and mosque in Lower Manhattan, New York City, United States. The developers hoped to promote interfaith dialogue. Due to its proposed location, two blocks from the World Trade Center site of the September 11 attacks, the proposed building was widely and controversially referred to as the "Ground Zero mosque", and the issue was amplified as an astroturf campaign to influence the 2010 United States elections.

The project would replace an existing 1850s Italianate building that was damaged in the attacks. The original design was by SOMA Architects principal Michel Abboud, who wrestled for months with the challenge of making the building fit naturally into its lower Manhattan surroundings. He felt it should have a contemporary design, but also look Islamic. His design included a 500-seat auditorium, theater, performing arts center, fitness center, swimming pool, basketball court, childcare area, bookstore, culinary school, art studio, food court, and a memorial to the victims of the September 11 attacks. It also included a prayer space for the Muslim community that would accommodate 1,000–2,000 people.

In late September 2011, a temporary 4,000-square-foot (370 m^{2}) Islamic center opened in renovated space at the Park51 location. In summer 2014, it was announced that there would instead be a three-story museum with a prayer space, as well as condos, at 49–51 Park Place. The plans were changed again in September 2015 when the owner announced a 667-foot (203 m) 70-story luxury condominium building at the site. In May 2016, financing was secured for a 43-story condominium building with room for an Islamic cultural museum adjacent to it.

The condominium building, called 45 Park Place, started construction in 2017 and was nearly completed by 2019. Construction of the Islamic cultural space, slated to contain 16,000 square feet (1,500 m^{2}) of space and measure 71 feet (22 m) tall at 51 Park Place, had not begun as of 2026.

== Background ==
Plans to build what was then called "Cordoba House" were reported in The New York Times in December 2009, at a location that was already in use for Muslim worship. Early response to the project was not pronounced, and one libertarian commentator provided positive coverage. The plans were reviewed by Manhattan Community Board 1 in May 2010, at which time they attracted some national media attention. The project's organizers stated that it was intended to be "a platform for multi-faith dialogue, striving to promote inter-community peace, tolerance and understanding; locally in New York City, nationally in America, and globally." They said that it was modeled on the noted Manhattan Jewish Community Center at 76th Street and Amsterdam Ave. The proposal triggered an intense nationwide controversy.

The original Cordoba House sparked a controversy among well funded experts, already engaged in what some have labeled as misinformation campaigns, warning of the threat of radical Islam. Numerous other protests, which have reached millions of Americans, were sparked by a campaign launched by conservative bloggers Pamela Geller and Robert Spencer, founders of Stop Islamization of America, who dubbed the project the "Ground Zero mosque", and a national controversy ensued. Conservative media also involved in protests against Islam following the September 11 attacks had published material during previous campaigns.

Supporters of the project argued that opponents' arguments are based on the notion that Islam, rather than Islamic radicals, was responsible for the attacks on the World Trade Center. The New York Times reported that Muslim religious facilities previously existed at the World Trade Center itself before the attacks.

== Naming of the project ==
The proposed location of Park51

The project was originally called Cordoba House, then renamed Park51, in reference to the street address on Park Place. Later, the Imam leading the project introduced some ambiguity by again referring to the project as "Cordoba House". The Park51 website then clarified that Park51 is the community center, while Cordoba House is the "interfaith and religious component of the center".

Cordoba Initiative said the name "Cordoba House" was meant to invoke 8th–11th century Córdoba, Spain, which they called a model of peaceful coexistence among Muslims, Christians, and Jews. According to The Economist, the name was chosen because Muslims, Jews, and Christians created a center of learning in Córdoba together. The name was criticized; for example, Newt Gingrich said that it was "a deliberately insulting term" that symbolizes the Muslim conquerors' victory over Christian Spaniards, and noted that the Muslims had converted a Cordoba church into the third largest mosque in the world. Similarly, Raymond Ibrahim, an outspoken critic of Islam and former associate director of the Middle East Forum, said the project and name were not "a gesture of peace and interfaith dialogue" but were "allusive of Islamic conquest and consolidation" and that Americans should realize that mosques are not "Muslim counterparts to Christian churches" but rather, "are symbols of domination and centers of radicalization". The opposition to Park51 believes that Islam builds mosques on "conquered territory" as symbols of "territory" and "conquest".

Park51 is often referred to as the "Ground Zero mosque". Since it is neither located directly on the former World Trade Center site, Ground Zero, nor primarily a mosque, some news media have advised against the use of this term. The Associated Press suggested several alternate terms including "mosque 2 blocks from WTC site", "Muslim (or Islamic) center near WTC site", "mosque near ground zero", and "mosque near WTC site". Cordoba Initiative says the building is not strictly a mosque. Anushay Hossain in The Huffington Post criticises the use of the name Ground Zero mosque, and says it is "Not a mosque but an Islamic Community Center". Jean Marbella in The Baltimore Sun says the building is closer to a YMCA center than a house of worship.

== History ==
=== Site use ===
==== Before 2001 ====
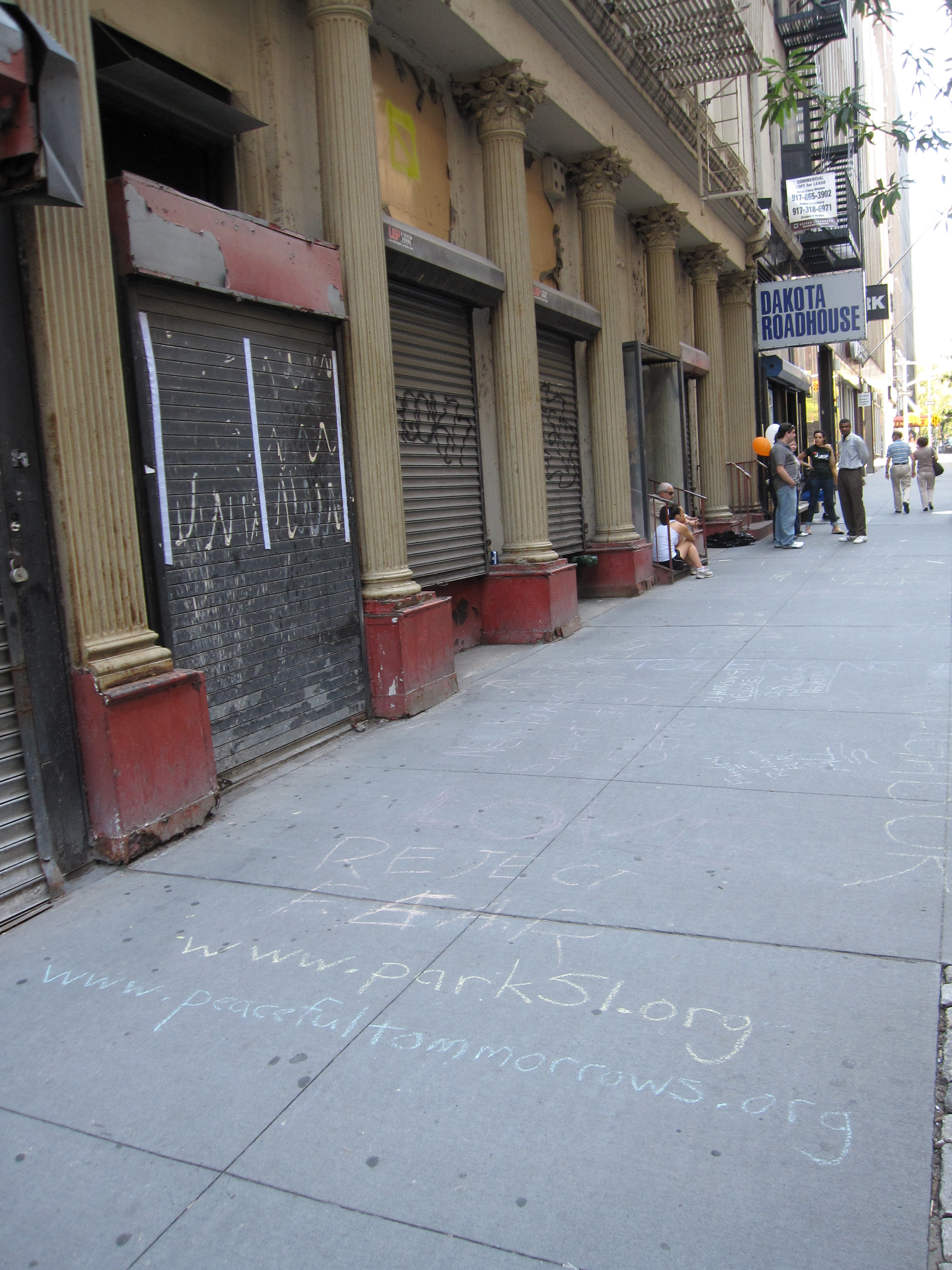
Slogans drawn by supporters on the pavement in front of the former Burlington Coat Factory, in 2010

45–47 Park Place was constructed between 1857 and 1858, in the Palazzo style architecture.

The stone-faced building, designed by Daniel D. Badger, was originally constructed for a shipping firm of a prominent New York shipping magnate. Its Italian palazzo style was a throwback to a prior time of European grandeur, and was intended to evoke images of economic might. The building is an example of the "store and loft" structures that were prevalent in the dry goods warehouse districts of Lower Manhattan.

The building was one of only a few stand-alone structures in southern Tribeca that were nominated – but never designated – as individual landmarks, during an effort in the 1980s to create a Tribeca historic district. In September 1989, the Commission had held public hearings and considered the building for landmark status, but it never acted on the matter, and the building was "calendared" ever since. By August 2010, city building records reflected that out of a group of 29 buildings that had been proposed for historic landmark designation in 1989, including 45–47 Park Place, twenty-three had been deemed landmarks and six were pending. The pending applications included 45–47 Park Place. At that point, New York City had more than 11,000 landmarked buildings.

Muslims had a presence in Lower Manhattan for many years prior to the September 11, 2001, attacks. At least two mosques existed near the World Trade Center, and several designated Muslim prayer rooms existed within the World Trade Center buildings.

==== September 11, 2001, attacks ====
A diagram showing the areas where debris from American Airlines Flight 11 and United Airlines Flight 175 fell upon Lower Manhattan during the course of the September 11 terror attacks.

During the September 11 attacks, the five-story building at 45–47 Park Place, between West Broadway and Church Street, was severely damaged. When United Airlines Flight 175 struck the South Tower of the World Trade Center, part of the plane's landing gear, engine and fuselage came out the north side of the tower and crashed through the roof of 45–47 Park Place, and through two of its floors. The plane parts destroyed three floor beams, and severely compromised the building's internal structure. The damage was not immediately noticed during an exterior assessment. It was later discovered during an interior assessment. In April 2013, the New York Police Department announced that surveyors inspecting the building had discovered a 17-inch (43 cm) wide piece, five feet (1.5 m) long airplane part complete with Boeing identification number wedged in an 18-inch (46 cm) wide alley between 51 Park and 50 Murray Street. Initially officials thought it was part of the landing gear but Boeing confirmed it was the trailing edge flap actuation support structure of an airplane flap from a Boeing 767, the type of jet which hit both towers. A photograph of the piece initially showed a rope around it. Police said the rope was used by an officer who lassoed it to see the identification number. Boeing could not say which specific plane it was from.

==== 2001–2009 ====
The 45–47 Park Place building, located about two blocks (600 feet or 180 meters) north of the World Trade Center site, was owned by Stephen Pomerantz and his wife Kukiko Mitani and leased to the Burlington Coat Factory. For years, Mitani attempted to sell the building, at one point asking for $18 million. It lay abandoned until its purchase in July 2009. For several months thereafter, the building was used as an overflow prayer space for up to 450 Muslims, with services led by Feisal Abdul Rauf, an Imam based at the al-Farah mosque in nearby TriBeCa.

=== Purchase and investors ===
In July 2009, the real estate company and developer Soho Properties purchased the building and property at 45–47 Park Place for $4.85 million in cash. Soho Properties' Chairman and CEO, Sharif El-Gamal, initially planned to build a condominium complex at the site, but was convinced by Imam Feisal Abdul Rauf's idea for a community center with a prayer space. El-Gamal's business partner is Nour Mousa, the nephew of Amr Moussa, the Secretary General of the Arab League.

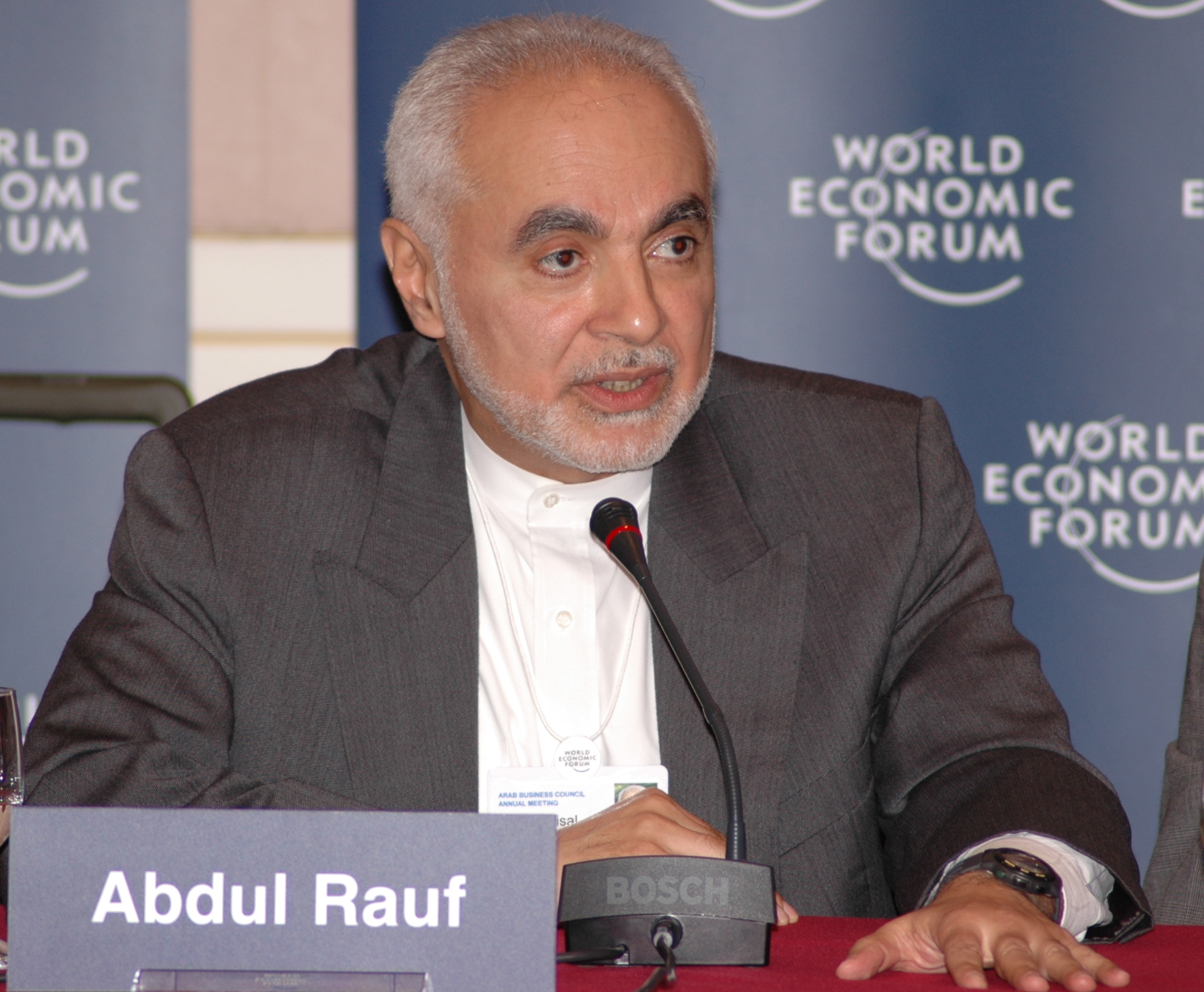
Imam Feisal Abdul Rauf

The investors in the transaction were the Cordoba Initiative, a tax-exempt foundation with assets of $20,000, and the American Society for Muslim Advancement (ASMA), also a non-profit organization. At the time, Rauf was founder, CEO, and Executive Director of Cordoba Initiative, and founder and CEO of ASMA, and his wife, Daisy Khan, was the ASMA Executive Director. In the Cordoba Initiative's first five years, from 2004–08, it raised less than $100,000. Both organizations were run out of the same New York office. The two foundations proposed to use the property as the site for a $100 million community center modeled after NYC's Jewish Community Centers and YMCAs. They were working on the project with El-Gamal, their co-developer.

The 49–51 Park Place half of the "45–51" parcel was still owned by the utility Con Edison (Con Ed). Soho Properties paid an additional $700,000 to assume a $33,000-a-year lease with Con Ed, for its adjacent attached former sub-station. The plan was to build the facility on the site of the two buildings, as the lease for 49–51 Park Place was expire in 2071. The two buildings were connected internally, with common walls having been taken down. El-Gamal informed Con Ed in February 2010 that he wanted to exercise his purchase option on the lease. Although the price was reportedly estimated at $10–$20 million, El-Gamal said the cost "is not an issue". The sale was to be reviewed by the New York Public Service Commission, where it might face a vote by a five-member board controlled by the New York governor's office.

The specific location of the planned facility, "where a piece of the wreckage fell", so close to the World Trade Center, was a primary selling point for the Muslims who bought the building. Rauf said it "sends the opposite statement to what happened on 9/11" and "We want to push back against the extremists."

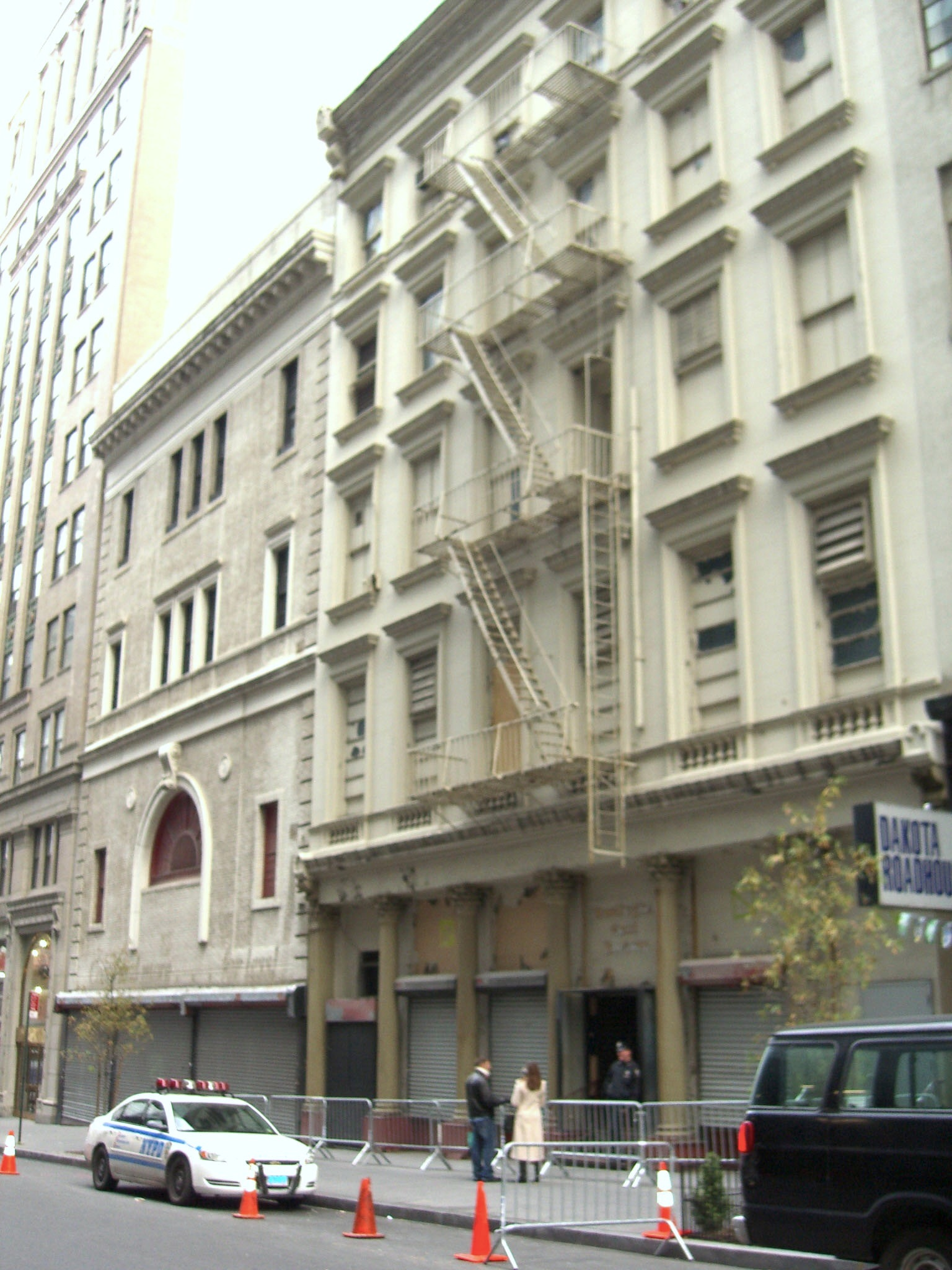
The former Burlington Coat Factory buildings at 45–51 Park Place, in 2010

=== Planned facilities ===
While the media widely described the center as a mosque, and the protests were against the mosque, the Initiative's official blog portrayed it as a community center with prayer space, making comparisons to the YMCA or Jewish Community Center. The Initiative said that some services planned for Park51 such as the restaurant and performance center, disqualify it from being a mosque. Daisy Khan, Imam Rauf's wife and partner, in August 2010 also said:

We insist on calling it a prayer space and not a mosque, because you can use a prayer space for activities apart from prayer. You can't stop anyone who is a Muslim despite his religious ideology from entering the mosque and staying there. With a prayer space, we can control who gets to use it.

The official website for the facility had said it would include "a mosque, intended to be run separately from Park51 but open to and accessible to all members, visitors and our New York community". By September 2010, the word mosque had been replaced with "prayer space". In an interview in July 2010, lead developer of the project Sharif el-Gamal had supported the inclusion of a mosque as needed by the New York Muslim community.

The Muslim prayer space is planned to occupy two floors of the 13-story building. Besides the prayer space, the Initiative's plan includes a 500-seat auditorium, theater, performing arts center, fitness center, swimming pool, basketball court, childcare services, art exhibitions, bookstore, culinary school, and a food court serving halal dishes.

El-Gamal said he wanted the building to be energy-efficient and transparent, most likely with a glass façade. The project envisions the demolition of two buildings at 45–47 Park Place and Broadway which were damaged on 9/11. They would be replaced by a glass and steel 100,000-square-foot (9,300 m^{2}) structure with a new address, 45–51 Park Place. A number of commentators stated that the builders planned either the groundbreaking or opening date to coincide with anniversaries of the September 11 attacks. Khan said in a July 2010 conversation with Media Matters for America that such assertions were "absolutely false" and that the construction timeline had not been determined; furthermore, those making such assertions have no proof of their claims. However, in a May 2010 Associated Press interview Khan said that the Initiative may plan for groundbreaking to coincide with the 10th anniversary of the attacks.

Khan also said that it was anticipated that 1,000 to 2,000 Muslims would pray at the prayer center every Friday, once it was completed.

Khan said the project is intended to foster better relations between Islam and Americans. Explaining the choice of location, she said, "We decided we wanted to look at the legacy of 9/11 and do something positive." She added that her group represents moderate Muslims who want "to reverse the trend of extremism and the kind of ideology that the extremists are spreading". Pointing to the fact that ordinary Muslims have been killed by Muslim extremists all over the world, Khan also said about the center, "For us it is a symbol ... that will give voice to the silent majority of Muslims who suffer at the hands of extremists. A center will show that Muslims will be part of rebuilding Lower Manhattan."

=== Community board advisory vote ===
On May 25, 2010, the local community board backed part of the plans for Cordoba House to be built on the site in a non-binding advisory vote of 29-to-1, with 10 abstentions. The endorsement related only to "the important community facilities [the project] will provide", and the resolution indicated that the board "takes no position regarding the religious aspects or any religious facilities associated with either the Cordoba Initiative or the Cordoba House Project". The board's chairwoman, Julie Menin, supported deletion of references to the building as a mosque and interfaith center that were in an earlier draft of the resolution, saying: "I personally was uncomfortable with the language that talked about the religious institution. I believe it's not the purview of a city agency to be weighing in on the siting of any religious institution, be it a mosque, synagogue, or church."

The meeting where the vote was held was contentious. Some of the speakers supporting the project were Muslims who lost family members in the attacks, and were booed by protesters. Some non-Muslim relatives of 9/11 victims also spoke in support, but other family members objected to the project, claiming the location is insensitive.

=== Landmark status declined and litigation ===
As the controversy grew, New York City's Landmarks Preservation Commission agreed to reconsider the 1980s landmark application which it had not acted on previously. On August 3, 2010, it voted 9–0 against granting landmark status and historic protection to the building. That cleared the way for it to be demolished, and the new Cordoba House to be built in its place.

The following day, Timothy Brown, a firefighter who survived 9/11, filed a lawsuit in New York State Supreme Court in Manhattan asking the court to nullify the Commission's decision. He praised 45–47 Park Place, quoting the Commission's own description of it as "a fine example of the Italian Renaissance-inspired palazzi" that flourished in the mid-19th century in the area. The suit was filed on his behalf by the American Center for Law and Justice, a conservative public interest firm.

On July 10, 2011, Justice Paul G. Feinman of the New York State Supreme Court dismissed Brown's case, writing that the firefighter was "an individual with a strong interest in preservation of the building", but added that he lacked any special legal standing regarding its fate. Adam Leitman Bailey, the lawyer who represented the Islamic center's developer pro bono, called the decision "a victory for America" and said, "Despite the tempest of religious hatred, the judge flexed our Constitution's muscles enforcing the very bedrock of our democracy." Jack Lester, a lawyer for Brown, said, "We believe the brave men and women who risked their lives have standing to preserve the monuments and historic buildings at ground zero."

=== Revised plans ===
On September 21, 2011, Park51 was opened to the public as 4,000 square feet (370 square metres) of renovated space in the Burlington Coat Factory building hoping to replace the building "in several years time". Visitors were able to view 160 portraits of immigrant children living in New York during the exhibit called "NYChildren", and a modest carpeted prayer room is located in the lower level.

In August 2011, The New York Times reported that Sharif El-Gamal, the project's developer, was quietly proceeding with efforts to move Park51 forward, embracing a "slower, more deliberate and more realistic approach" than before. However, in April 2014, Sharif El-Gamal announced his plans to demolish the existing building and replace it with a three-story museum of Islamic culture. He hired French architect Jean Nouvel.

In late August 2014, the Times announced that the original mosque plans would not proceed. Instead, a three-story Islamic museum with a prayer space and condos would be built at 49–51 Park Place. At the time, the proposal for the updated mosque was the location of a Con Edison building, though Con Edison subsequently sold the structure. The buildings on the two lots have not been torn down yet, however.

In September 2015, it was reported by Bloomberg that the owner of the site then instead planned to build a 667-foot (203 m), 70-story luxury condominium building at the site to take advantage of the growing residential real estate market in lower Manhattan. In addition to the 70-story condo at 45 Park Place, El-Gamal planned a three-story Islamic museum at 51 Park Place.

On May 19, 2016, Sharif El-Gamal secured Sharia-compliant financing for 45 Park Place, which had become a planned 43-story, 665-foot (203 m) building. A $174 million loan was secured from a consortium let by Malayan Banking Bhd., and an additional $45 million in financing came from Saudi Arabia. When the project was approved in 2017, it included some of Manhattan's most expensive condominiums, with prices ranging from $1.92 million for a one-bedroom unit to $39–41 million for each of the two duplex penthouses. According to The New York Times, El-Gamal said that he hoped the building's features, such as 11-foot-high (3.4 m) ceilings and full-height windows, would attract tenants. The apartment building was close to topping out by early 2019. In April 2019, a month before the scheduled topping-out, The Real Deal reported that El-Gamal had $10 million in unpaid bills.

Meanwhile, El-Gamal submitted revised plans for the Islamic cultural space at 51 Park Place in 2017, in conjunction with the development of 45 Park Place. The cultural center would be a 16,000-square-foot (1,500 m^{2}) space 71 feet (22 m) tall. The space had yet to start construction as of December 2019.

In September 2026, a foreclosure auction was scheduled for the site after the lender claimed that the developer had defaulted on their mortgage.

== Controversy ==
The debate around the Cordoba Project, which Pamela Geller erroneously labeled Ground Zero Mosque, became a national controversy. Opponents cited polls showing that most Americans, including most residents of New York State and New York City, though not most residents of Manhattan, opposed it. In 2010, however, polls showed that most Americans believed the Park51 developers had a legal right to proceed with the project.

The proposed Cordoba Project was neither a mosque nor at Ground Zero. Supporters argued the First Amendment protected the rights of the developers. They further argued that two positive opportunities existed with the project proceeding and coming to fruition: one, for Muslims to demonstrate peaceful Islamic values; and two, for Americans to reassert their commitment to tolerance and diversity.

Opponents of the project cited proximity to the site of the September 11 attacks, its scale, sources of funding, or expressed concern that the project's name was intended as a reference to the 8th century Umayyad conquest of Visigothic Córdoba.

Prominent opponents and supporters of the project were found among the families of the 9/11 victims, the American and worldwide Muslim communities, and local and national politicians, making it a divisive political campaign issue in the 2010 midterm elections. The controversy over the project coincided with unexpected protests of mosque projects in other states, leading to concerns that relations between Muslims and non-Muslims within the US were deteriorating.

Donald Trump made an offer to purchase the Park51 property for $6 million to stop its construction, saying that "I am making this offer as a resident of New York and citizen of the United States, not because I think the location is a spectacular one (because it is not), but because it will end a very serious, inflammatory, and highly divisive situation that is destined, in my opinion, to only get worse".

=== Funding ===
After multiple falsehoods about funding sources connected to radical Islam, Imam Abdul Rauf reiterated the promise to identify all financial backers of Park51. Developer Sharif El-Gamal had stated that they will refuse money from groups such as the government of Iran and Hamas as well as any other "organizations that have un-American values". The New York Post stated that initially Imam Abdul Rauf said the project would be funded entirely by the Muslim American community, though later he told London-based Arabic-language newspaper Asharq Al-Awsat that he would seek funding from Muslim and Arab nations. The latter story was also reported by NBC.

Claudia Rosett, a journalist with the Foundation for Defense of Democracies and a weekly columnist for Forbes, questioned the source of the funding for the project. Some U.S. politicians such as Connecticut Senator Joe Lieberman, an Independent Democrat, and Republicans Peter King and Rick Lazio, asked for an investigation of the group's finances, especially its foreign funding, despite the fact that fundraising for the project had not yet begun. King said: "The people who are involved in the construction of the mosque are refusing to say where their [$100 million] funding is going to come from." Lazio said: "Let's have transparency. If they're foreign governments, we ought to know about it. If they're radical organizations, we ought to know about it."

Dr. Zuhdi Jasser, President of the American Islamic Forum for Democracy, called for transparency in the funding of the project, suggesting foreign sources could imply an ulterior agenda. Reza Aslan responded to Dr. Jasser's demand by saying that it was "absurd" to assume that overseas funding must necessarily involve extremism. He also said that it would be acceptable to demand mosques to be transparent about funding if the same was also demanded of a Catholic church or a Jewish temple.

Mayor Michael Bloomberg said: "Where does [the money] come from?' I don't know. Do you really want every time they pass the basket in your church, and you throw a buck in, they run over and say, ' ... where do you come from? ... Where did you get this money?' No." The TV news anchor Rick Sanchez said: "if you start going into who is giving money to whom ... you have to go to my church. You have got to go to Rome and start asking where the money is going into Rome. And you have to go to the Mormons and ask them, well, what are they doing with their money?"

Vogel and Russonello cite claims that donations "totaling $900,000, that the government of Qatar and a foundation run by Saudi Prince Alwaleed bin Talal have made to nonprofits or projects headed by Feisal Abdul Rauf" are involved. They further explore the funding of the project's opponents.

On the side of opponents to the project, fundings come from the Fairbrook Foundation, the umbrella organization of pro-Israel activists Aubrey & Joyce Chernick.

=== Abdul Rauf's views of the project ===
Abdul Rauf, a Kuwaiti-American Sufi Muslim, was the chief proponent of the project until he was replaced in January 2011. Some U.S. politicians and others voiced concerns about his views. Others, including The Economist, have described him as "a well-meaning American cleric who has spent years trying to promote interfaith understanding".

In an interview on September 8, 2010, Abdul Rauf was asked if he would have done anything differently had he known the controversy would erupt. His answer: "If I knew this would happen, this would cause this kind of pain, I wouldn't have done it. My life has been devoted to peacemaking."

=== Effects on recruitment of radical Islamists ===
Counterterrorism analysts have noted that the developing controversy over Park51 has provided a "recruitment opportunity" for radical Islamist groups. According to Evan Kohlmann, the senior partner in the New York-based security firm Flashpoint Global Partners, "[t]he reaction is, at least on the part of extremists, fairly gleeful – that America is playing into our hands, that America is revealing its ugly face, and that even if it doesn't further radicalize people in the Middle East, there's no doubt that it will radicalize a kind of a key constituency that al-Qaida and other extremists are seeking to covet [sic], seeking to court, which is the small number of homegrown extremists here in the United States".

Newsweek quotes a Taliban operative as explicitly connecting increased opposition to the project with increased support for the Taliban's cause. "By preventing this mosque from being built, America is doing us a big favor," the Taliban operative stated. "It's providing us with more recruits, donations, and popular support."

=== Documentary ===
In 2012, filmmaker David Osit produced a documentary about the Park51 controversy, specifically following the story through the experiences of developer Sharif El-Gamal. The film aired on PBS in the fall of 2013.

== Public opinion ==
=== Polls ===
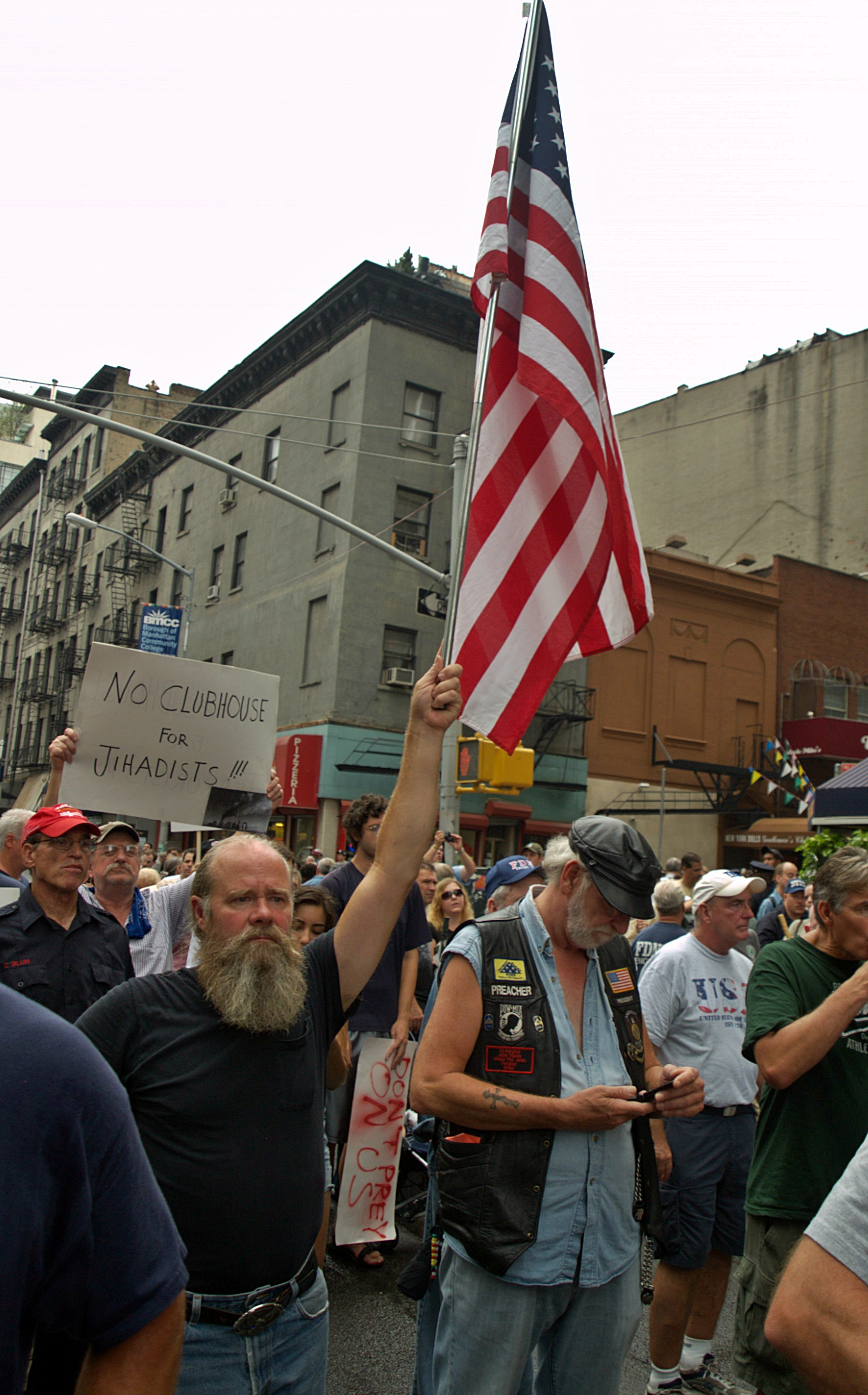
Opponents of Park51 protest on August 22, 2010

Polls showed that the majority of Americans, New York State residents, and New York City residents opposed building the center near Ground Zero, although a plurality of Manhattanites supported construction. In July 2010, the majority of Americans were opposed to the Islamic center. By a margin of 54–20%, American adults were opposed to a mosque being built near Ground Zero, a national Rasmussen Reports poll found that month. Furthermore, according to an August 10–11 Fox News poll, 64% of Americans (a majority of each of Democrats (56–38%), Republicans (76–17%), and Independents (53–41%)) thought it would be wrong to build a mosque and Islamic cultural center so close to Ground Zero, and 30% felt it would be appropriate.

A CNN poll conducted August 6–10, 2010, found that Americans opposed the Park51 project by a margin of 68–29%. A majority of each of Democrats (54–34%), Republicans (82–17%), and Independents (70–24%) were opposed. An Economist/YouGov national poll taken the week of August 19, 2010 confirmed these findings. Overall, this poll found that Americans opposed the Park51 project by a margin of 57.9–17.5%, with 24.5% undecided on the question. Democrats (41.0–28.0%), Republicans (88.3–1.7%) and Independents (57.6–21.3%) were opposed to the project according to this poll.

In addition, by a margin of 52–31% New York City voters opposed the construction, according to a Quinnipiac University Polling Institute poll carried out in June 2010. At the same time, 46% of Manhattanites supported it, while 36% opposed it. Opposition was strongest in Staten Island, where 73% opposed it while only 14% supported it. A higher percentage of Republicans (82%) than Democrats (45%) opposed the plan.

A Marist Poll taken July 28 – August 5, 2010 showed a similar city-wide margin of registered voters against it (53–34%, with 13% unsure), although those in Manhattan supported it, reversing the figures: 53% to 31%, with 16% unsure. An updated Marist poll in September 2010 showed that support for Park51 had grown, with 41% in favor and 51% opposed. Support among African Americans, liberals, Democrats, and residents of the Bronx had increased. Manhattanites remained supportive.

Statewide, by a margin of 61–26% New Yorkers opposed the community center's construction at that location, according to another poll in August 2010, by Siena Research Institute, whose poll question wording was criticized by a writer at Slate magazine. A majority of both Republicans (81%) and Democrats (55%) were opposed to it, as were conservatives (85%), moderates (55%), and liberals (52%). Among New York City residents, a margin of 56–33% opposed it.

Some polls tried to gauge public opinion of Muslims' right to build Park51 near ground zero. The Quinnipiac University Polling Institute poll of New York State residents released August 31, 2010 found a 54–40 percent majority of voters agreeing 'that because of American freedom of religion, Muslims have the right to build the mosque near Ground Zero'. A Fox News national poll taken August 10–11, 2010 found that 61% felt that the project developers had a right to build a mosque there (a majority of Democrats (63–32%), Republicans (57–36%), and Independents (69–29%)). The Economist/YouGov poll taken the week of August 19, 2010 concurred that Democrats (57.5–24.9%) and Independents (62.3–25.2%) believed Muslims had a "constitutional right" to build a mosque at the site, but found that Republicans (31.8–53.2%) did not believe that Muslims had such a right. The poll found that 50.2%, overall, supported the constitutional right to build at the site, 32.7% were opposed and 17.1% had no opinion.

The Economist/YouGov poll also noted that 52% of Americans believe that "Muslims should be able to build mosques in the United States wherever other religions can build houses of worship", as opposed to 34% who believe that "there are some places in the United States where it is not appropriate to build mosques, though it would be appropriate to build other houses of worship" and 14% who believe "mosques should not be permitted anywhere in the United States".

=== Opposition ===
The prospect of building a mosque close to Ground Zero was offensive to some opponents of the construction project, since the hijackers in the September 11, 2001, attacks were Muslims. Some opponents suggested that Park51 was a "victory marker for Islamic extremists".

==== 9/11 families ====
Some relatives of victims of the September 11 attacks said they found the proposal offensive because the perpetrators who committed the attacks did so in the name of Islam. A number said that it was not an issue of freedom of religion, property rights, or racism, but rather one of sensitivity to the families of those killed, in choosing the specific location of the center.

A group of victims' relatives, 9/11 Families for a Safe & Strong America, called the proposal "a gross insult to the memory of those who were killed on that terrible day". Debra Burlingame, a co-founder of the group whose brother died in the attacks, said:

This is a place which is 600 feet [180 m] from where almost 3,000 people were torn to pieces by Islamic extremists ... it is incredibly insensitive and audacious ... for them to build a mosque ... so that they could be in proximity to where that atrocity happened ... The idea that you would establish a religious institution that embraces the very shariah law that terrorists point to as their justification for what they did ... to build that where almost 3,000 people died, that is an obscenity to me.

Sally Regenhard, whose son was a firefighter who was killed in the attacks, and who has testified before Congress on 9/11, said that the center would be "sacrilege on sacred ground", and that "People are being accused of being anti-Muslim and racist, but this is simply a matter of sensitivity." Former NY Fire Department Deputy Chief Jim Riches, whose son Jim was killed, said: "I don't want to have to go down to a memorial where my son died on 9/11, and look at a mosque," adding "this is all about location, location, location. It's not about religious freedom ... be sensitive to the families." Michael Burke, whose brother died, wrote: "Freedom of religion or expression and private property rights are not the issues ... Decency is; right and wrong is ... [M]any believe that their "rights" supersede all other considerations, like what is respectful, considerate, and decent. A mosque ... steps from Ground Zero in a building damaged in the attacks is ... astoundingly insensitive".

C. Lee Hanson, whose son, daughter-in-law, and baby granddaughter were killed, felt that building a tribute to Islam so close to the World Trade Center site would be insensitive: "The pain never goes away. When I look over there and I see a mosque, it's going to hurt. Build it someplace else." Rosemary Cain, whose son was killed, called the project a "slap in the face", and said "I think it's despicable. That's sacred ground", and "I don't want a mosque on my son's grave". Nancy Nee, whose brother was killed, said: "It's almost like a trophy. The whole thing just reeks of arrogance at this point."

Evelyn Pettigano, who lost a sister, said: "I don't like it. I'm not prejudiced ... It's too close to the area where our family members were murdered." Dov Shefi, whose son Haggai was killed, said: "the establishment of a mosque in this place ... is like bringing a pig into the Holy Temple. It is inconceivable that in all the city of New York, this site was specifically chosen." Cindy McGinty, whose husband was killed, said she hoped that officials would keep an eye on the funding source for the project, adding: "Why did they pick this spot? Why aren't they being more sensitive? I don't trust it." Barry Zelman, whose brother was killed, said: "We can say all Muslims did not do this, which is true. But they [terrorists] did it in the name of that religion. You wouldn't have a German cultural center on top of a death camp."

Rosaleen Tallon-DaRos, whose brother died, urged that the mosque not be put on that site, as did Tim Brown, a New York City firefighter who survived the attack. Maureen Basnicki, a Canadian whose husband Ken died, questioned the message of the mosque and said that "this all adds hurt and insult to our injuries."

==== Muslims ====
The building of an Islamic community center near Ground Zero has been criticized by some Muslims. The Ahmadiyya Muslim Community does not directly oppose the building of a mosque near ground zero but views that the sentiments of non-Muslims should not be unduly hurt. They state that there are other places where mosques can be built and they do not see why that particular location has been chosen. The head of the Ahmadiyya Muslim Community, Mirza Masroor Ahmad in London, stated that:

If a mosque is built at the proposed site, then the Ahmadiyya Muslim Community would like to see churches, synagogues, Hindu places of worship and places of worship of all other religions also built near Ground Zero. That would be a good example of how from an act of evil and terror has emerged unity and peace.

Muslim neoconservative journalist Lulu Schwartz (then known as Stephen Schwartz), Executive Director of the non-profit Center for Islamic Pluralism, said that building the center two blocks from Ground Zero was inconsistent with the Sufi philosophy of simplicity of faith and sensitivity towards others and disregarded the security of American Muslims. Another criticism concerned what Schwartz described as Abdul Rauf's radical and suspect associations.

Another founding member of the Center for Islamic Pluralism, Zuhdi Jasser, who is also the founder of the American Islamic Forum for Democracy, a group of Muslim professionals in the Phoenix Valley of Arizona, strongly opposed the project, saying:

For us, a mosque was always a place to pray ... not a way to make an ostentatious architectural statement. Ground Zero shouldn't be about promoting Islam. It's the place where war was declared on us as Americans." ... American freedom of religion is a right, but ... it is not right to make one's religion a global political statement with a towering Islamic edifice that casts a shadow over the memorials of Ground Zero. ... Islamists in 'moderate' disguise are still Islamists. In their own more subtle ways, the WTC mosque organizers end up serving the same aims (as) separatist and supremacist wings of political Islam.

Neda Bolourchi, a Muslim whose mother died in 9/11, said: "I fear it would become a symbol of victory for militant Muslims around the world."

Authors Raheel Raza and Tarek Fatah, board members of the Muslim Canadian Congress, said:

New York currently boasts at least 30 mosques so it's not as if there is pressing need to find space for worshipers. [W]e Muslims know ... [this] mosque is meant to be a deliberate provocation to thumb our noses at the infidel. The proposal has been made in bad faith, ... as Fitna, meaning "mischief-making" that is clearly forbidden in the Koran. ... As Muslims we are dismayed that our co-religionists have such little consideration for their fellow citizens, and wish to rub salt in their wounds and pretend they are applying a balm to soothe the pain.

Akbar Ahmed, Ibn Khaldun Chair of Islamic Studies at American University, while noting that blaming all Muslims for 9/11 was "ridiculous", said:

I don't think the Muslim leadership has fully appreciated the impact of 9/11 on America. They assume Americans have forgotten 9/11 and even, in a profound way, forgiven 9/11, and that has not happened. The wounds remain largely open ... and when wounds are raw, an episode like constructing a house of worship – even one protected by the Constitution, protected by law – becomes like salt in the wounds.

Abdul Rahman Al-Rashid, general manager of Al-Arabiya television, also criticized the project in a column titled "A House of Worship or a Symbol of Destruction?" in the Arab daily A-Sharq Al-Awsat, saying:

Muslims do not aspire for a mosque next to the September 11 cemetery ... the mosque is not an issue for Muslims, and they have not heard of it until the shouting became loud between the supporters and the objectors, which is mostly an argument between non-Muslim US citizens!

Rima Fakih, the first Muslim-American crowned Miss USA as Miss USA 2010, opposed the project on the grounds of it being insensitive to families of 9/11 victims, telling Inside Edition:

I totally agree with President Obama with the statement on the constitutional rights of freedom of religion. [But] it shouldn't be so close to the World Trade Center. We should be more concerned with the tragedy than religion.

==== Politicians ====
A number of American politicians spoke out against the Park51 project. Arizona Senator John McCain, the Republicans' 2008 presidential nominee, said that it "would harm relations, rather than help", while his running mate Sarah Palin, the former Alaska governor, wrote on Twitter that "Ground Zero Mosque supporters: doesn't it stab you in the heart, as it does ours throughout the heartland? Peaceful Muslims, pls refudiate" [sic]. Other critics included Mitt Romney, the former Massachusetts governor and 2012 Republican presidential candidate; Georgia Senator Johnny Isakson; Maine Senator Olympia Snowe; Idaho Senators Jim Risch and Mike Crapo; Idaho Congressman Mike Simpson; and Minnesota Governor Tim Pawlenty. North Carolina congressional candidate Ilario Pantano said, "It is about ... territorial conquest. This mosque is a Martyr–Marker honoring the terrorists".

Former House Speaker Republican Newt Gingrich said: "It's not about religion and is clearly an aggressive act that is offensive." Commenting on the project's name, he wrote:

"Cordoba House" is a deliberately insulting term. It refers to Cordoba, Spain – the capital of Muslim conquerors, who symbolized their victory over the Christian Spaniards by transforming a church there into the world's third-largest mosque complex ... every Islamist in the world recognizes Cordoba as a symbol of Islamic conquest.

Newt Gingrich would say "There should be no mosque near Ground Zero in New York so long as there are no churches or synagogues in Saudi Arabia."

Gingrich also decried the proposed Islamic center as a symbol of Muslim "triumphalism," and said that building the center near the site of the 9/11 attacks "would be like putting a Nazi sign next to the Holocaust Museum." Commenting on what Gingrich said, The Economist claimed that "Like Mr bin Laden, Mr Gingrich is apparently still relitigating the victories and defeats of religious wars fought in Europe and the Middle East centuries ago. He should rejoin the modern world, before he does real harm."

New York Republicans who criticized the plan included former New York City mayor Rudy Giuliani, who called it a "desecration; Nobody would allow something like that at Pearl Harbor ... Let's have some respect for who died there and why they died there." Congressman Peter King, then the ranking Republican on the House Homeland Security Committee, called it "offensive to so many people." Other opponents included former New York Governor George Pataki and former Congressman Rick Lazio. Gubernatorial candidate Carl Paladino said, "The vast majority of New Yorkers and Americans have rejected their idea. If a bridge was their intent, why jam it down our throats? Why does it have to be right there?" He said that if he were elected Governor of New York, he would use the power of eminent domain to stop construction of the center and instead build a war memorial in its place.

New York Republican Congressional candidate George Demos also objected. He said that the St. Nicholas Greek Orthodox Church, the only religious structure destroyed in the 9/11 attacks, should be rebuilt before moving forward on building an Islamic center in the area, and called for an investigation into the project's financing.

New York City Council Member Dan Halloran became the first elected official in New York City to publicly criticize the project, "If we want a nation of peace," said city councilman Dan Halloran, whose cousin died on 9/11, "then peace comes with understanding. And they need to understand that this is sacred ground to New Yorkers."

Paul Sipos, a member of Manhattan Community Board 1, said:

If the Japanese decided to open a cultural center across from Pearl Harbor, that would be insensitive. If the Germans opened a Bach choral society across from Auschwitz, even after all these years, that would be an insensitive setting. I have absolutely nothing against Islam. I just think: Why there?

A Republican political action committee, the National Republican Trust Political Action Committee, a Washington-based organization, created a television commercial attacking the proposal, saying "we Americans will be heard".

Democratic Independent Connecticut Senator Joe Lieberman indicated that he felt the project should be halted, pending further evaluation of its impact on the families and friends of 9/11 victims, project's sponsors' intentions, and their sources of funding.

New York Democratic Assemblyman of District 92 and Attorney-General-candidate Richard Brodsky said it was, "offensive to me ... raises concerns and bad memories and needs to be dealt with on a human level. The murder wasn't an Islamic crime, but it was a crime committed in the name of Islam by people most Muslims reject."

Senate Majority Leader Democrat Harry Reid of Nevada said, "it is time to bring people together, not a time for polarization, and I think it would be better off for everyone if it were built somewhere else." Jim Manley, a spokesperson for Reid earlier had said, "The First Amendment protects freedom of religion ... Senator Reid respects that, but thinks that the mosque should be built some place else."

Democratic National Committee chairman, former Democratic Presidential Candidate, and 79th Governor of Vermont Howard Dean called the project "a real affront to people who lost their lives" and wrote "the builders have to be willing to go beyond what is their right and be willing to talk about feelings whether the feelings are 'justified' or not." Dean also argues that most people opposed "are not right-wing hate mongers".

Democratic Representative Michael E. McMahon of New York's 13 District provided a written statement:

We have seen very clearly in the past weeks that building a mosque two blocks from ground zero will not promote necessary interfaith dialogue, but will continue to fracture the faiths and citizens of our city and this country. As such, I am opposed to the construction of the Cordoba Center at the currently-proposed location and urge all parties to work with local community leaders to find a more appropriate site.

Democratic Representative Steve Israel of the 2nd District in New York said in Newsday, "While they have a constitutional right to build the mosque, it would be better if they had demonstrated more sensitivity to the families of 9/11 victims. I urge them to do so before proceeding further."

Democratic Representative Tim Bishop of New York's 1st District also disagrees with the location,

As a New Yorker, I believe Ground Zero is sacred ground and should unite us. If the group seeking to build the mosque is sincere in its efforts to bring people together, I would urge them to seek an alternative location which is less divisive. I dispute the wisdom of building at that location, not the constitutional right.

==== Organizations ====
New York City fireman Tim Brown opposed the project, saying: "A mosque ... that's using foreign money from countries with shariah law is unacceptable, especially in this neighborhood". Brown allied with the American Center for Law & Justice (ACLJ), a conservative law firm founded by Pat Robertson that champions the rights of Christians to build and worship freely. Brown sought to pressure Abdul Rauf to disclose fully the project's funding sources. Peter Ferrara, General Counsel of the American Civil Rights Union (not to be confused with the ACLU), observed: "The Cordoba Mosque was the third largest mosque complex in the world ... built on the site of a former Christian church, to commemorate the Muslim conquest of Spain. This perpetuated a cultural Muslim practice of building mosques on the sites of historic conquests."

More than 20,000 people signed an online petition for the Committee to Stop the Ground Zero Mosque, and unsuccessfully lobbied the NYC Landmarks Preservation Commission to give the location landmark status, which would have added a major hurdle to construction.

Richard Land, President of the Southern Baptist Convention's Ethics & Religious Liberty Commission, said "putting a mosque ... very close to Ground Zero is unacceptable. ... Even though the vast majority of Muslims ... condemned their actions on Sept. 11, 2001, it still remains a fact that the people who perpetrated the 9/11 attack were Muslims and proclaimed they were doing what they were doing in the name of Islam." Bill Rench, pastor of Calvary Baptist Church which is located near the proposed mosque site, also spoke out against its construction.

The Zionist Organization of America opposes the construction of Park51 due to its location, and questions about Abdul Rauf. The Simon Wiesenthal Center, parent organization of the Museum of Tolerance Los Angeles and the Museum of Tolerance Jerusalem, also opposes the location of the planned Park51. The Anti-Defamation League (ADL) originally opposed building Park51 near the former World Trade Center and advocated for Park51 to be built in a different location. The ADL reversed this position in 2021, saying they "were wrong, plain and simple."

Speaking in his capacity as a "spokesperson for the conservative Tea Party political movement", Mark Williams called it a monument to the terror attacks. He characterized the proposed religious facilities at the site as a place which would be used for "terrorists to worship their monkey god". Williams would be expelled from the National Tea Party Federation two months after making this remark, for racially inflammatory remarks regarding a later and unrelated controversy.

The Dove World Outreach Center also held a protest against the building of Park51.

==== Others ====
Writing in the National Review, political blogger Daniel Pipes stated his opposition to the construction of any Islamist institution anywhere although he did not object to a truly moderate Muslim institution in proximity to Ground Zero.

British comedian and internet personality Pat Condell criticized the construction of Park51 in a video entitled "No mosque at Ground Zero" where he claimed that it was representative of Islamic triumphalism and that the United States was soon on the verge of Islamization and having its freedoms trimmed, as Europe has.

Similarly, political commentator Charles Krauthammer also criticized the construction, saying that it could potentially serve as a breeding ground for Islamic extremism.

On August 9, 2010, Greg Gutfeld stated that he planned on constructing New York City's first Islamic-friendly gay bar next to the proposed center. He stated that "As an American, I believe they have every right to build the mosque. ... Which is, why, in the spirit of outreach, I've decided to do the same thing." He insisted that "this is not a joke," and further stated that the project was "an effort to break down barriers and reduce deadly homophobia in the Islamic world."

=== Support ===
Project supporters have argued that the Park51 building would not be visible from the World Trade Center site, and that some victims and victims' families have expressed support for the Park51 project, as well as acknowledging the fact that victims of the 9/11 attacks also included Muslims.

==== 9/11 families ====
Some relatives of victims of the 9/11 attacks expressed support for the project. Colleen Kelley, who lost her brother William on 9/11, says, the "irony in the debate over the section of the building that would house a mosque is that one might assume that God (the same God to Jews-Christians-Muslims) would be pleased with any type of effort that involves prayer and service to others."

Orlando Rodriguez and Phyllis Schaefer Rodriguez, whose son died in the attack, say they "support the building of the Islamic community center in lower Manhattan" and "feel that it would honor our son and other victims".

Herb Ouida, whose son Todd died, said: "To say that we're going to condemn a religion and castigate a billion people in the world because they're Muslims, to say that they shouldn't have the ability to pray near the World Trade Center – I don't think that's going to bring people together and cross the divide."

Marvin Bethea, a former EMS worker who was forced to retire in 2004 because of breathing problems caused by working at the 9/11 site, believes racism is a factor in the controversy, He said "even though my life has changed, I don't hate the Muslims. Especially being a black man, I know what it's like to be discriminated against. I've lived with that."

Donna O'Connor, whose pregnant daughter died on 9/11, expressed the opinion that "This building will serve as an emblem for the rest of the world that Americans ... recognize that the evil acts of a few must never damn the innocent."

Ted Olson, former Solicitor General in the George W. Bush administration, whose wife, television commentator Barbara Olson, died in the plane that crashed into the Pentagon, has expressed support for the rights of the Park51 organizers to construct the new site. In remarks on MSNBC, Olson said "we don't want to turn an act of hate against us by extremists into an act of intolerance for people of religious faith."

Bruce Wallace, whose nephew died as he rushed in to help the victims, says "the media seems eager to trumpet the feelings of those hurt by the idea of the center. They mostly ignore my feelings and those, like me, who feel the center is an important step for Americans."

Judith Keane, whose husband was killed on 9/11, says "To punish a group of Americans who live in peace for the acts of a few is wrong. The worst atrocities in history found their base in fear of those who were different."

Talat Hamdani, whose son was a first responder in the rescue effort and died in 9/11, co-wrote an article supporting the center in the interest of pluralism. She has also criticized the argument about sensitivity arguing that it was more about the legality of the situation and "our rights as Americans. We are protected under the Constitution. There is freedom of religion." Implying that the ban could be the thin edge of the wedge she said "You know, if it's one faith today, it's going to be another faith tomorrow. That is scary. And to scapegoat the Muslims for the acts of a foreign terrorist, that is – that is hatred." She went on "... if that argument is valid, then, by that token, Timothy McVeigh's actions also makes all Christians terrorists. So, that is wrong."

The anti-war group September 11th Families for Peaceful Tomorrows, released a statement in support of the center, saying "we believe that welcoming the Center, which is intended to promote interfaith tolerance and respect, is consistent with fundamental American values of freedom and justice for all," adding it will be "an emblem for the rest of the world that Americans stand against violence, intolerance, and overt acts of racism and that we recognize that the evil acts of a few must never damn the innocent".

Terry Rockefeller, whose sister was killed, said: "this doesn't insult her at all. This celebrates the city she loved living in. It is what makes America what we are."

Sue Rosenblum, of Coral Springs, Florida, whose son Josh was killed in the WTC on 9/11, said in reference to the planned center: "What are we teaching if we say you can't build here? That it's OK to hate? This is a country based on freedom of religion."

==== Politicians ====
On August 13, 2010, in a speech at the annual White House Iftar dinner celebrating the Islamic holy month of Ramadan, President Barack Obama acknowledged the right of Muslims to build the Islamic center. Obama said, "Muslims have the same right to practice their religion as anyone else in this country. And that includes the right to build a place of worship and a community center on private property in lower Manhattan, in accordance with local laws and ordinances." Obama clarified the next day that he was only speaking of legal rights and "was not commenting ... on the wisdom of making the decision to put a mosque there".

New York Mayor Michael Bloomberg strongly endorsed the project, saying that Ground Zero was a "very appropriate place" for a mosque, because it "tells the world" that the U.S. has freedom of religion for everyone. Responding to opposition, he said:

The government should never, never be in the business of telling people how they should pray, or where they can pray. We want to make sure that everybody from around the world feels comfortable coming here, living here, and praying the way they want to pray.

"Democracy is stronger than this," he added. Remarking on opposition to the center's location, he said: "To cave to popular sentiment would be to hand a victory to the terrorists. We should not stand for that." Responding to a question about the pain the project was causing some family members, he said:

I don't see an enormous number of people. I was at a fundraiser ... maybe 50 ... people who had lost [family] members. 100% in that room kept saying, 'please keep it up, keep it up'. ... our relatives would have wanted this country, and this city, to follow and actually practice what we preach.

Bloomberg was asked if he was satisfied that "he is indeed a man of peace given his background where he's supposedly supported Hamas, blamed the U.S. for 9/11 attacks?" The mayor responded:

My job is not to vet clergy in this city. ... Everybody has a right to their opinions. You don't have to worship there. ... this country is not built around ... only those ... clergy people that we agree with. ... . It's built around freedom. That's the wonderful thing about the First Amendment – you can say anything you want.

Community Board 1 Financial Committee Chairman Edward "Ro" Sheffe opined: "it will be a wonderful asset to the community." New York City Councilwoman Margaret Chin said: "The center is something the community needs".

Additional New York politicians supported the proposal. These included Manhattan Borough President Scott Stringer, who said "I'll do everything I can to make sure this mosque does get opened", and U.S. Representative Jerrold Nadler, who stated that "the government has no business deciding". Other supporters included New York State Senator Daniel Squadron, New York City Comptroller John Liu, New York City Council Speaker Christine Quinn, and Public Advocate Bill de Blasio.

Nadler remarked that "a mosque in the Pentagon ... hasn't drawn any criticism", despite the Pentagon also being a target of the 9/11 attacks. What is referred to as the "Pentagon mosque" is, more precisely, a non-denominational chapel which was built and dedicated in 2002 in honor of Pentagon employees and passengers of American Airlines Flight 77 who died in the September 11 attack. Daily Muslim prayer sessions are held there weekday afternoons, and weekly Muslim services are led by an imam from a local mosque every Friday, which means the room can be considered a mussallaah, a sacred space where Muslims "consistently perform their mid-day prayer when they do not have access to a mosque". This Muslim use of the Pentagon facility has drawn no complaints.

Orrin Hatch, a Republican Senator from Utah, voiced support of the project on religious freedom grounds. Hatch is a Mormon and cited an instance where a neighborhood tried to prevent a Mormon temple from being built.

Congressman Ron Paul (R-Tex.) published a statement of support on August 20, 2010 to his campaign website defending the Cordoba House's planned Islamic community center. Congressman Paul attributed the controversy over the community center to Islamophobia and neo-conservatives who disregard their commitment to the First Amendment and property rights to agitate voters.

Representative Keith Ellison, the U.S.'s first Muslim congressman, supported the center's location on the basis of the First Amendment and religious tolerance, and Massachusetts Governor Deval Patrick also voiced support, saying: "The sooner we separate the peaceful teaching of Islam from the behavior of terrorists, the better for all of us."

Mark McKinnon, a former advisor to Republican President George W. Bush, criticized Republican opposition to the project: "And here we are, reinforcing al Qaeda's message that we're at war with Muslims." Another former Bush aide, speechwriter and policy advisor Michael Gerson, agreed that prohibiting the center would "undermine the war on terrorism":

The militants hope, above all else, to provoke conflict between the West and Islam – to graft their totalitarian political manias onto a broader movement of Muslim solidarity. America hopes to draw a line that isolates the politically violent and those who tolerate political violence – creating solidarity with Muslim opponents and victims of radicalism.

Mahmoud al-Zahar, a founding member and leader of Hamas in the Gaza Strip, said of the plan: "We have to build everywhere," and "In every area we have, (as) Muslim(s), we have to pray, and this mosque is the only site of prayer." Zahar also said "We have to build the mosque, as you are allowed to build the church and Israelis are building their holy places."

Former US President Bill Clinton also supported Park51, after noting that many Muslims were also killed on September 11. He suggested that the developers could have avoided controversy if they dedicated the center to the Muslim victims of the attacks.

Former Minnesota Governor Jesse Ventura gave his support to Park51, arguing that the First Amendment allows for a mosque to be built near Ground Zero. Ventura also argued that denying the right for a mosque to be built near Ground Zero would be similar to removing churches from Oklahoma City, where the Oklahoma City bombing occurred (the deadliest act of terrorism in the United States prior to 9/11), if Timothy McVeigh, the man who perpetrated the attack, was a Christian. Ventura also demanded that opposition to the Ground Zero Mosque should be ignored because

people need to remember, the Constitution and the Bill of Rights should be written in stone. You cannot subject them to the popularity. They are there to protect unpopular things, like the First Amendment. The First Amendment is to protect unpopular speech simply because popular speech doesn't need to be protected. It's as simple as that. And you can't, you know, bend the Constitution to the blowing winds of whatever polls might say, otherwise it's a worthless, useless document which in many ways they're turning it to that anyway.

==== Organizations ====
Ibrahim Hooper, Communications Director of the Council on American-Islamic Relations (CAIR), charged that the controversy was "manufactured" by "bigots". He also asserted that only a vocal minority was complaining. And Nihad Awad, CAIR's Executive Director, said that the opinion of Republican Congressman Peter King "should not be considered, because his ideas are extreme". Fareed Zakaria, Newsweek journalist and CNN host, also strongly supported the project, and returned a prestigious award he received in 2005 from the Anti-Defamation League, saying he was "personally and deeply saddened" by their opposition towards the project. He wrote:

Rauf, is a moderate Muslim clergyman. He has said one or two things about American foreign policy that strike me as overly critical – but it's stuff you could read on The Huffington Post any day. On Islam, his main subject, Abdul Rauf's views are clear: he routinely denounces all terrorism – as he did again last week, publicly.

The Muslim Public Affairs Council also supported the project.

The Anti-Defamation League (ADL), a U.S. Jewish civil rights group that had spoken out against anti-Muslim bigotry, denounced what it saw as bigoted attacks on the project. Its head opined that some of those who oppose the project are "bigots", and that the plan's proponents have every right to build the center at that location. Nevertheless, the group recommended selecting a different location, and appealed to the builders to consider the sensitivities of the victims' families. As a consequence of their statement, Fareed Zakaria, the winner of the ADL's 2005 Hubert Humphrey First Amendment Freedoms Prize has returned the prize and the prize money.

The Jewish political group J Street also supported the construction on religious freedom grounds.

The New York Civil Liberties Union and the American Civil Liberties Union supported it, citing principles of religious freedom. The Interfaith Alliance also supported the project, while indicating that it agreed with the need for transparency as to who is funding the project.

A petition circulated by the liberal political action committee Votevets.org garnered 14,000 signatures in support of the center, including 450 veterans from the Afghanistan and Iraq wars, and 4,000 veterans from other wars.

==== Academia ====
Mark R. Cohen, professor of Jewish Civilization in the Near East in the Department of Near Eastern Studies at Princeton University, opined that "The presence of ... mosques like the one planned near Ground Zero, which will be an educational center as well as a place of prayer, is one good way of transcending ... ignorance."

Rabbi Geoffrey Dennis, of the University of North Texas Jewish Studies Program said that when it comes to the issue of freedom to practice religion in a private sphere, such as on private property in Lower Manhattan, freedom of religion is virtually inviolate.

Boston University Department of Religion professor Stephen Prothero spoke out against the arguments that Cordoba House should not be built near Ground Zero.

Padraic O'Hare, professor of Religious and Theological Studies and Director of the Center for the Study of Jewish-Christian-Muslim Relations at Merrimack College, argued that prayer leads to peace: "Build a Muslim house of prayer near Ground Zero? ... Hand me the shovel."

During a CNN interview, Reza Aslan, a professor of creative writing at the University of California, Riverside, defended Imam Abdul Rauf as "cited by government's sources in the United States as one of America's most pluralistic peace promoting religious leaders in the country". He defended the center as an "American-Muslim" center similar to the Jewish center built close to it.

==== Others ====
During the 2010 US Open tennis tournament Pakistan's Aisam-ul-Haq Qureshi said, "For me, as a Muslim, that's what makes America the greatest country in the world – freedom of religion, freedom of speech. If the mosque is built, I think it's a huge gesture to all the Muslim community out there in the world. I would really appreciate it."

== See also ==
- Islamic Cultural Center of New York
- Abbey Mills Mosque – A similar proposal to expand a mosque in London.
