= Muslim supporters of Israel =

Muslim supporters of Israel, also known as Muslim Zionism or Islamic Zionism, refer to Muslims and cultural Muslims who support the right to self-determination of the Jewish people and the likewise existence of a Jewish homeland in the Southern Levant, traditionally known as the Land of Israel and corresponding to the modern polity known as the State of Israel. Muslim supporters of the Israeli state are widely considered to be a rare phenomenon in light of the ongoing Israeli–Palestinian conflict and the larger Arab–Israeli conflict. Within the Muslim world, the legitimacy of the State of Israel has been challenged since its inception, and support for Israel's right to exist is a minority orientation.

Some Muslim clerics, such as Abdul Hadi Palazzi of the Italian Muslim Assembly and author Muhammad Al-Hussaini, believe that the return of the Jews to the Holy Land as well as the establishment of a Jewish state is in accordance with the teachings of Islam. Prominent people of Muslim background who publicly support the movement of Zionism include ex-Muslim Afghan journalist Nemat Sadat, Pakistani former radical Islamist Ed Husain, Egyptian former militant-turned-author Tawfik Hamid, Pakistani American author and journalist Tashbih Sayyed, and Bangladeshi journalist Salah Choudhury. Additional Muslim figures who have publicly voiced support for Israel include Irshad Manji, Salim Mansur, Enes Kanter, Abdurrahman Wahid, Reza Pahlavi, Mithal al-Alusi, Kasim Hafeez, Abdullah Saad Al-Hadlaq, Zuhdi Jasser, Asra Nomani, Nuseir Yassin, and Khaleel Mohammed.

The Islamic world's historical stance on Israel has often been influenced by its commitment to the Palestinian cause. The 2020 Abraham Accords marked a shift in this dynamic, fostering more open support for Israel in certain Arab countries, enabling Muslim social media influencers to promote positive narratives about Israel.

== History ==
=== Early twentieth century ===
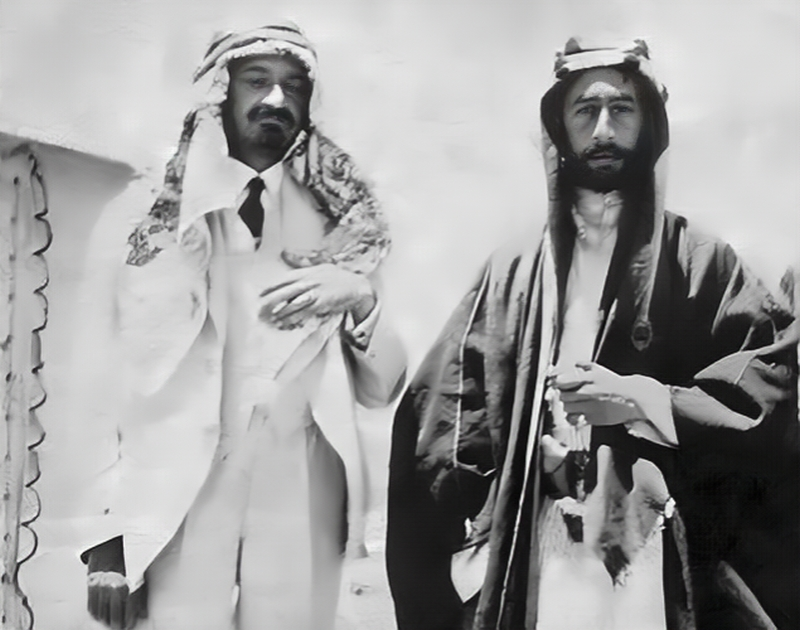
Faisal (right) with Chaim Weizmann (also wearing Arab dress as a sign of friendship) in Syria, 1918.

After World War I, the Sharif of Mecca, Hussein bin Ali and his son, the King Feisal of Hijaz and then of Iraq, proclaimed pro-Zionist views.

On March 23, 1918, Al Qibla, the daily newspaper of Mecca, printed the following words in support of the Balfour Declaration, calling upon the Palestine Arabs to welcome the Jews and to cooperate with them:

The resources of the country [Palestine] are still virgin soil and will be developed by the Jewish immigrants (...) we have seen the Jews from foreign countries streaming to Palestine from Russia, Germany, Austria, Spain, and America. The cause of causes could not escape those who had a gift of deeper insight. They knew that the country was for its original sons [abna'ihi-l-asliyin], for all their differences, a sacred and beloved homeland. The return of these exiles [jaliya] to their homeland will prove materially and spiritually an experimental school for their brethren who are with them in the fields, factories, trades and all things connected to the land.

On 3 January 1919, Hussein's son, king Faisal I of Iraq and Chaim Weizmann, President of the World Zionist Organization signed the Faisal–Weizmann Agreement for Arab-Jewish cooperation, in which Faisal conditionally accepted the Balfour Declaration based on the fulfilment of British wartime promises of development of a Jewish homeland in Palestine and on which subject he stated:

We Arabs... look with the deepest sympathy on the Zionist movement. Our deputation here in Paris is fully acquainted with the proposals submitted yesterday by the Zionist Organisation to the Peace Conference, and we regard them as moderate and proper. We will do our best, in so far as we are concerned, to help them through; we will wish the Jews a most hearty welcome home... I look forward, and my people with me look forward, to a future in which we will help you and you will help us, so that the countries in which we are mutually interested may once again take their places in the community of the civilised peoples of the world.

As'ad Shukeiri, a Muslim scholar ('alim) of the Acre area, and the father of PLO founder Ahmad Shukeiri, rejected the values of the Palestinian Arab national movement and was opposed to the anti-Zionist movement. He met routinely with Zionist officials and had a part in every pro-Zionist Arab organization from the beginning of the British Mandate, publicly rejecting Mohammad Amin al-Husayni's use of Islam to attack Zionism.

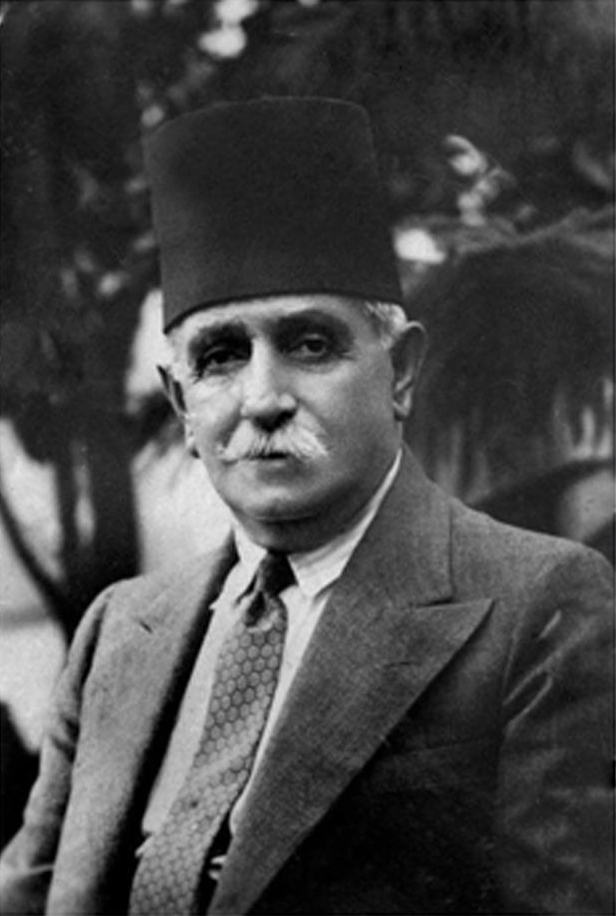
The president of the Muslim National Associations and the mayor of Haifa, Hassan Bey Shukri, supported the Balfour Declaration and for Zionist immigration to British Mandate Palestine.

In the 1920s, the Muslim National Associations was established by Muslim Arabs who were employed by the Palestine Zionist Executive. The president of the Muslim National Associations and the mayor of Haifa, Hassan Bey Shukri, has founded the organization with Sheikh Musa Hadeib from the village of Dawaymeh near Hebron and head of the farmers' party of Mt. Hebron.

In July 1921, Shukri sent a telegram to the British government, declaring support for the Balfour Declaration and Zionist immigration to British Mandate Palestine:

We strongly protest against the attitude of the said delegation concerning the Zionist question. We do not consider the Jewish people as an enemy whose wish is to crush us. On the contrary. We consider the Jews as a brotherly people sharing our joys and troubles and helping us in the construction of our common country.

In 1929, Hadeib was killed in Jerusalem, supposedly for his collaboration with the Zionists.

In the late 1930s, Amir Abdullah, ruler of Transjordan, and the pro-Hashemite leader of Syria, Abd al-Rahman Shahabandar, offered the Zionists to create a Jewish autonomy in Palestine under the Transjordanian throne, although they did not propose an independent Jewish state.

=== Modern times ===
A number of Muslim groups that have histories of conflict with Arabs, including Kurds and Berbers, have also supported Israel and Zionism. Ramin H. Artin, of the Kurdish-American Education Society, argues that the creation of Israel has been "a thorn in the eye of fascists who would rather eliminate the Jewish state". He concluded that an Israeli-Kurdish alliance is "natural", and that sincere mutual respect and recognition of each other's rights can lead to peace and prosperity.

Palazzi noted that although in present days support for Israel among Muslims is a minority orientation, there are some exceptions, such as former President of Indonesia and leader of Nahdlatul Ulama, Shaykh Abdurrahman Wahid, and the Grand Mufti of the Russian Federation, Shaykh Talgat Tajuddin, the Mufti of European Russia, Shaykh Salman Farid, who wrote a fatwa against the intifadah. According to Palazzi, more examples for Pro-Israeli Muslim clerics are the Muftis of Chechnya, Uzbekistan and Kazakhstan.

=== Abraham Accords ===
The Abraham Accords, signed in 2020, enabled a shift in Muslim sentiment regarding Israel in the Arab world. By normalizing relations between Israel, the UAE and Bahrain, the Accords allowed Arab citizens to openly express support for Israel without fear of backlash. This paved the way for a new generation of Muslim social media influencers to use platforms like Twitter and Instagram to promote positive perspectives on Israel to their large followings. For example, Loay Al-Shareef frequently highlights Jewish history and scripture to argue the legitimacy of Israel, while Fatema Al-Harbi shares her transformational experiences visiting Israel with her thousands of followers. Cross-cultural people-to-people trips organized by NGOs have proven pivotal in shifting broader Arab and Muslim perceptions of Israelis. Participants reported gaining first-hand understanding that Israelis are "normal, nice people" rather than the nefarious occupiers portrayed in regional media.

== Israeli Arab supporters of Israel ==
=== Muslim Bedouins ===
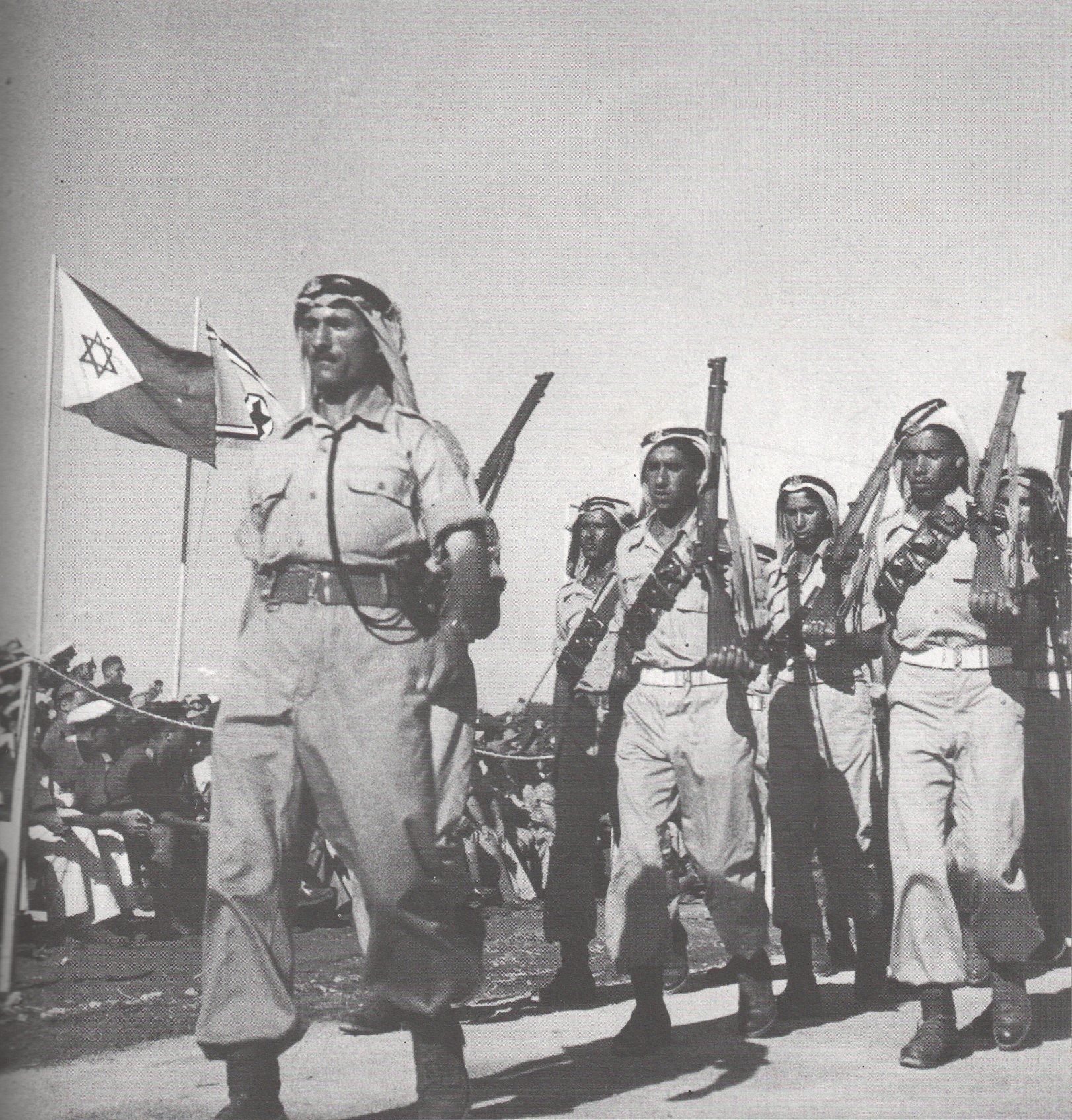
Bedouin IDF soldiers of Rumat al-Heib (عرب الهيب) during a military parade in Tel-Aviv in June 1949.

During the 1947–1949 Palestine war, many Bedouin switched sides to join the Zionist forces in opposing the invasion by the regular Arab armies.

Negev Bedouins, a Muslim minority which includes about 12% of Israeli Arabs, tend to identify more as Israelis than other Arab citizens of Israel. Many Negev Bedouins serve in the Israel Defense Forces. Each year, between 5–10% of the Bedouin of draft age volunteer for the IDF (unlike Druze and Jewish Israelis, they are not required by law to do so).

During the Palestinian Arab national movement's formation, Bedouins often perceived their tribe as their principal focus of identity, and they generally did not view themselves as a component of the emerging Palestinian identity.

Bedouins had long standing ties with nearby Jewish communities. Bedouins of Tuba-Zangariyye helped defend these communities in the 1936–1939 Arab revolt in Palestine. Formal co-operation between Jews and Bedouin began in 1946, when tribal leader Sheik Hussein Mohammed Ali Abu Yussef of the al-Heib tribe sent more than 60 of his men to fight alongside Zionist forces, forming the Pal-Heib unit of the Haganah. During the 1948 Arab–Israeli War, the Pal-Heib unit defended Jewish communities in the Upper Galilee against Syria. Sheik Abu Yussef was quoted in 1948 as saying, "Is it not written in the Koran that the ties of neighbors are as dear as those of relations? Our friendship with the Jews goes back many years. We felt we could trust them and they learned from us too".

Maj Fehd Fallah, a Bedouin from the village of Saad in the Golan Heights said in an interview: "Yes, I have fought against Muslims in Gaza," he says. "And I would fight again if I had to," he added. "Israeli Muslims who don't serve in the IDF should be ashamed for not serving their country."

Ismail Khaldi is the first Bedouin deputy consul of Israel and the highest ranking Muslim in the Israeli foreign service. Khaldi is a strong advocate of Israel. While acknowledging that the state of Israeli Bedouin minority is not ideal, he said

I am a proud Israeli – along with many other non-Jewish Israelis such as Druze, Bahai, Bedouin, Christians and Muslims, who live in one of the most culturally diversified societies and the only true democracy in the Middle East. Like America, Israeli society is far from perfect, but let us deals honestly. By any yardstick you choose – educational opportunity, economic development, women and gay's rights, freedom of speech and assembly, legislative representation – Israel's minorities fare far better than any other country in the Middle East.

=== Israeli Circassian Muslims ===
The Circassians in Israel are non-Arab, predominantly Sunni Muslims. The Circassians have had good relations with the Jewish community in Israel since the beginning of the Jewish settlement in the Land of Israel. The Circassian community in Israel helped the illegal immigration (Ha'apala) of Jews into Palestine during the British Mandate and fought on the Israeli side of the 1947–1949 Palestine war. In 1948, when Israel was created, Circassians of Palestine did not migrate to neighboring countries, but rather made the choice to stay within the borders of the new state and embrace full Israeli citizenship, according to academic Eleonore Merza. Like the Druze population, since 1958 male Circassians perform Israeli mandatory military service upon reaching the age of majority, while females do not. Many Circassians in Israel are employed in the security forces, including in the Border Guard, the Israel Defense Forces, the police and the Israel Prison Service. The percentage of army recruits among the Circassian community in Israel is particularly high. This loyalty to Israel is often considered as an act of betrayal by the Arab Muslims, who see Circassians as traitors to the Ummah.

=== View of Israel among Arab Israelis ===
A Truman Institute survey from 2005 found that 63% of the Arab citizens accept the principle that Israel is the state of the Jewish people. In a 2012 survey conducted by the University of Haifa Jewish-Arab Center, "Index of Jewish-Arab Relations in Israel 2012", 75% of Israeli Arabs stated that Israel has a right to exist as an independent state, and 48% that they could support its existence as a democratic, Jewish state.

== Muslim supporters of Israel by country ==
Notable Muslim supporters of Israel include Tawfik Hamid, a former self-described member of a terror organization and current Islamic thinker and reformer, Sheikh Prof. Abdul Hadi Palazzi, Director of the Cultural Institute of the Italian Islamic Community and self described Muslim Zionist, and Tashbih Sayyed – a Muslim Pakistani-American scholar, journalist, author, and self-described Muslim Zionist, Prof. Khaleel Mohammed, Islamic Law scholar of the San Diego State University and Salah Uddin Shoaib Choudhury, a Bangladeshi journalist and publisher, and a self-proclaimed Muslim Zionist.

=== Australia ===
Mohammad Tawhidi, an Iranian-born Australian Imam who was made an imam by Ayatollah Sayid Sadiq Shirazi in Qum, Iran in 2010. He holds several licenses from Islamic seminaries and is known for holding contrasting views from other Islamic experts, such as stating his support for Israel and declaring that ''Palestine is Jewish land.''

=== Bangladesh ===
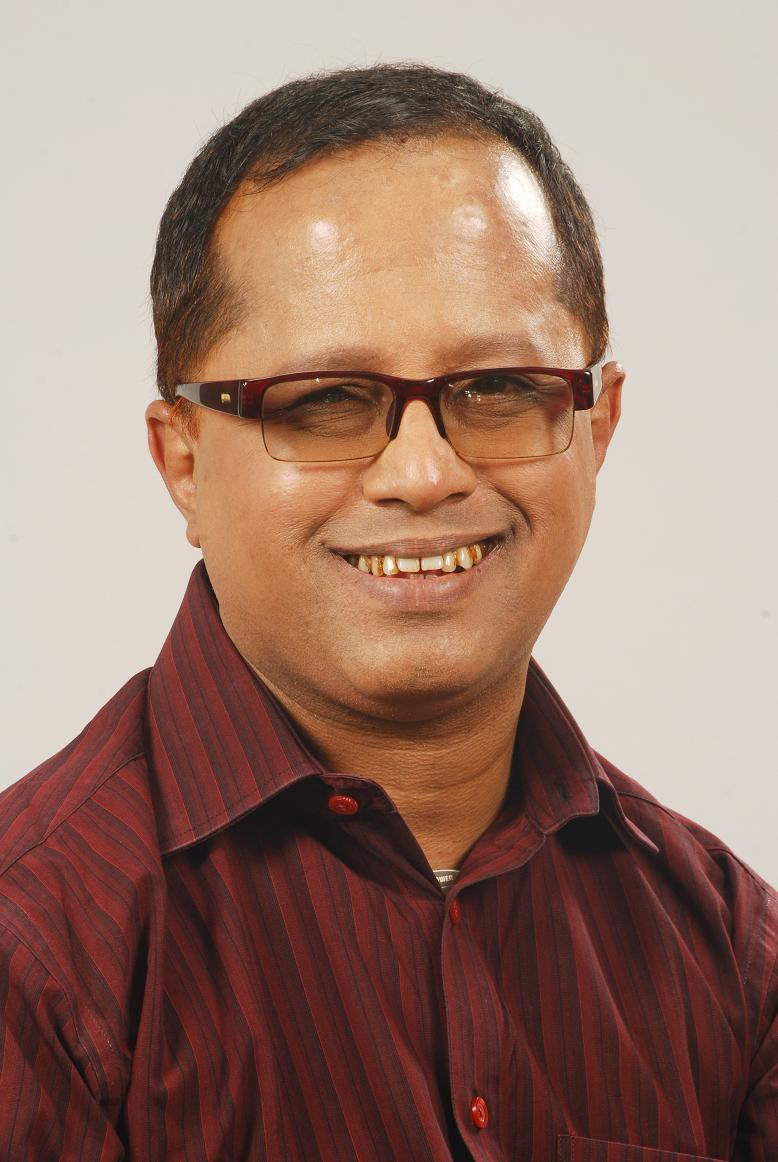
Salah Uddin Shoaib Choudhury

Salah Uddin Shoaib Choudhury, a Bangladeshi journalist and publisher, and a self-proclaimed Muslim Zionist. His newspaper, Weekly Blitz, criticizes the jihad culture and advocates inter-faith understanding between Muslims, Christians and Jews. Choudhury was arrested by Bangladeshi police on November 29, 2003, at Dhaka airport since he was scheduled to fly to Israel, a country Bangladeshi citizens are barred from travelling to. After release from 17-months imprisonment, Choudhury wrote in an Israeli newspaper "I also stand before you perhaps as a living contradiction: a Zionist, a defender of Israel, and a devout, practicing Muslim, living in a Muslim country." He said "I believe in the justice of the Zionist dream. I also acknowledge this historical reality: that the world has endeavored to crush that dream and, yes, even to destroy the viability of the Jewish people. At the same time, I live in an environment where people believe just as passionately in an opposing view—one that sees Israel as illegitimate; and the Jewish people as evil incarnate."

=== Canada ===
Irshad Manji, a Muslim Canadian author and an advocate of progressive interpretation of Islam, says that the Arabs' failure to accept the Jews' historical bond with Palestine is a mistake. Manji accepts that the Jews' historical roots stretch back to the land of Israel, and recognizes their right to a Jewish state. She further argues that the allegation of apartheid in Israel is deeply misleading, noting that there are in Israel several Arab political parties; that Arab-Muslim legislators have veto powers; and that Arab parties have overturned disqualifications. She also observes that Israel has a free Arab press; that road signs bear Arabic translations; and that Arabs live and study alongside Jews. She accuses Arab countries for the Palestinian refugees' plight, saying that they "interfered with every attempt to solve the problem" and that they would rather give "generous support to suicide bombers and their families" rather than help the needy refugees. According to Geneive Abdo, "Muslim Zionist" is a label which Manji "would no doubt accept".

In 2008, Salim Mansur, a Muslim Canadian Political Scientist, columnist and author, congratulated Israel for its 60th anniversary, and declared that the Jewish state "deserves admiration". He wrote, "Israel is a tiny sliver of land in a vast tempest-ridden sea of the Arab-Muslim world, and yet it is here the ancient world's most enduring story is made fresh again by Jews to live God's covenant with Abraham as told in their sacred literature." In 2010, he wrote: "The story of modern Israel, as many have noted, is a miracle unlike any [...] It is a robust and inclusive democracy, and is at the leading edge of science and technology [...] What hypocrites demand of Israelis and the scrutiny Israel is subjected to by them, they would not dare make of any other nation."

Tarek Fatah, a Pakistani-Canadian writer who identified with both Islam and pre-Islamic Punjabi Hinduism, held pro-Israel views.

=== France ===
Rama Yade, a Franco-Senegalese politician who served in the government of France from 2007 to 2010 and the current vice president of the centrist Radical Party, has been described as "notoriously pro-Israeli".

=== Indonesia ===
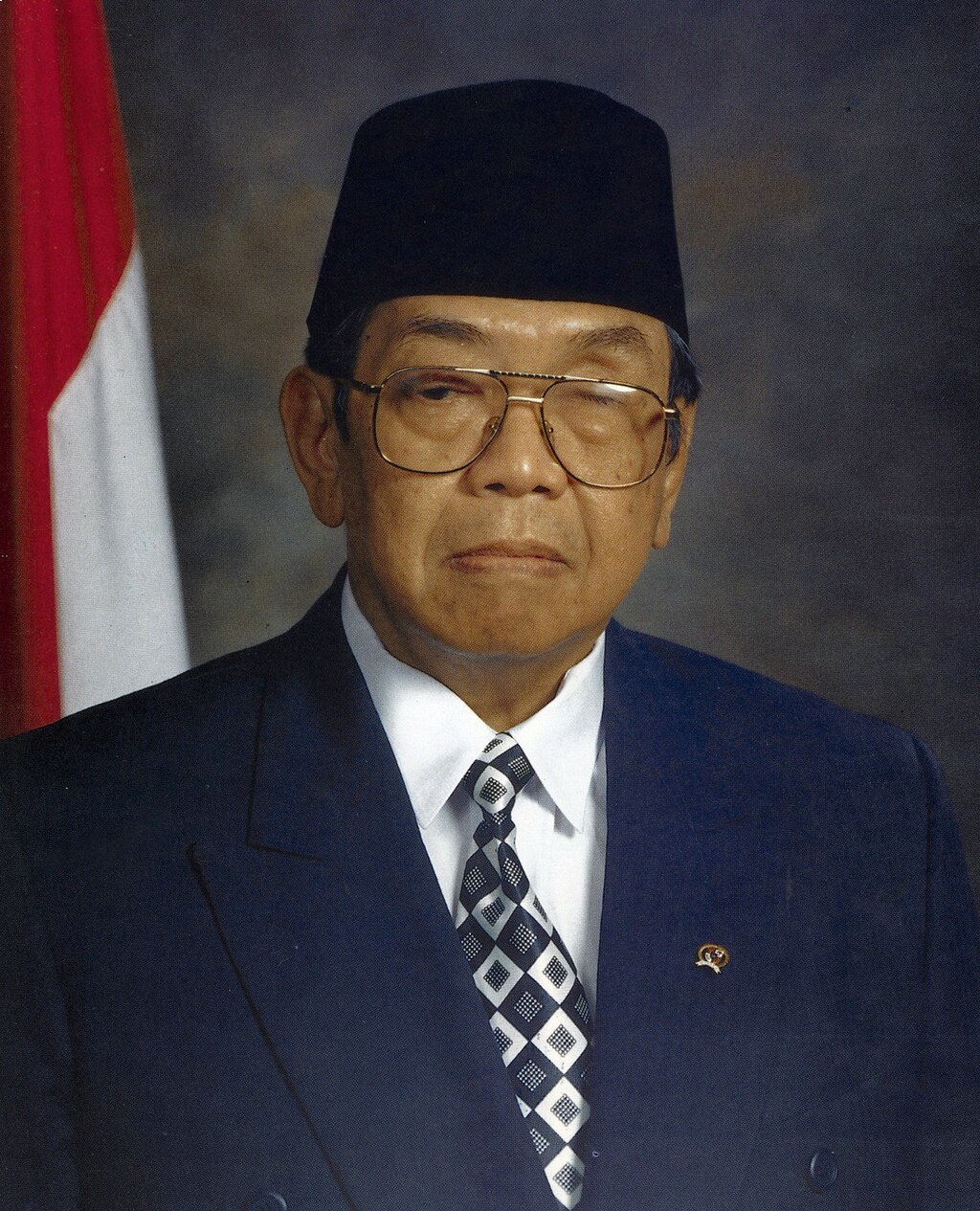
Abdurrahman Wahid, Indonesia's president from 1999 until 2001, visited Israel six times, calling for the Islamic world to recognise and acknowledge Israel's right to exist and prosper.

Abdurrahman Wahid, Indonesia's president from 1999 until 2001, was criticised for his pro-Israel views. Wahid moved to establish diplomatic and commercial relations with Israel, and visited Israel six times. In a 2002 interview to the ABC of Australia, Wahid said that the Islamic world should start recognising and acknowledging Israel's right to exist and prosper. He added, "I think Muslims are rational and rationality dictates that." In a 2004 interview to an Israeli newspaper, he was asked about his friendship with Israel, which was described as "unusual for an Islamic leader". Wahid replied, "I think there is a wrong perception that Islam is in disagreement with Israel. This is caused by Arab propaganda [...] Israel has a reputation as a nation with a high regard for God and religion — there is then no reason we have to be against Israel." According to Wahid, Israel "is a democracy in a sea of misunderstanding".

Recently the incumbent President Prabowo Subianto has been publicly criticized domestically and internationally for due to accusation of his pro-Israel stance. During his United Nations speech, Prabowo stated that “peace in Palestine could be achieved if Israel’s security is guaranteed” causing uproar among Indonesian.

=== Italy ===
In Italy, Sheikh Prof. Abdul Hadi Palazzi, director of the Cultural Institute of the Italian Islamic Community, represents a unique "Muslim Zionist", pro-Israel and pro-American position which according to Morten T. Højsgaard, Margit Warburg, although the organization is small in proportions, is a "thorn in the side of both moderate and radical Islamic fundamentalists in Italy".

In 1996, Palazzi and the Israeli scholar Asher Eder co-founded the Islam-Israel Fellowship to promote cooperation between Israel and Muslim nations.

Palazzi argues against calls for jihad against Israel and says there is no religious demand for Israel to give up control over Muslim holy places.

=== Iraq ===
Sarah Idan, former Miss Iraq and US Democratic party congress nominee, is an ardent Zionist, and believes the Arab-Israeli conflict is perpetuated by "the belief systems taught in Muslim countries, which are anti-Semitic" and is reinforced by media bias.

Mithal al-Alusi, a secular Muslim Iraqi lawmaker, who is openly pro-Israel, paid a heavy price for visiting Israel in September 2004, criticizing Hamas and Hezbollah as terrorist organizations, and advocating peace with the Jewish state. Upon his return to Iraq, the Sunni politician was immediately removed from Ahmed Chalabi's Iraqi National Congress Party (INC). In 2005, apparently as payback, a gunman opened fire on Alusi's car just after it left his house, killing two of his sons, Ayman, 21, and Jamal, 30, while he escaped unharmed. According to Alusi, there is no Iraqi-Israeli problem, and the interests of the two countries are parallel; thus, he advocates strategic relations between Iraq and Israel against terrorism. Alusi returned to Israel for a second visit in September 2008. Upon his return to Iraq, he was stripped of parliamentary immunity so that he could face charges of traveling illicitly to Israel. Later that year, Iraq's Federal Supreme Court ruled in his favor, maintaining it was no longer a crime for Iraqis to travel to Israel.

=== Jordan ===
The Jordanian Quranic scholar Sheikh Ahmad al-Adwan, also called the 'Zionist Sheikh', claims that according to the Quran, the land of Israel is promised to the Jews. He wrote,

Indeed, I recognize their sovereignty over their land. I believe in the Holy Koran, and this fact is stated many times in the book. For instance 'O my people! Enter the holy land which Allah hath assigned unto you,’ [Koran 5:21], ‘We made the Children of Israel inheritors of such things.' [Koran 26:59] and additional verses in the Holy Book.

Adwan asserts that Jordan is the land of Palestine, and says that most Palestinians would prefer to be Israeli citizens.

=== Kenya ===
Abdalla Mwidau, mayor of Mombasa during the 1970s, and a Muslim supporter of Israel, was elected to Kenyan parliament as the representative of Mombasa-South. In 1979, Mwidau conducted an information campaign among Muslims in the US, in which he praised Israel's assistance to developing African countries and specifically its assistance to Muslim education in Kenya. His political rivals, led by Sharif Kassir, denounced these activities, calling Mwidau a "Zionist agent". Mwidau remained in parliament until his death in 1986.

=== Pakistan ===
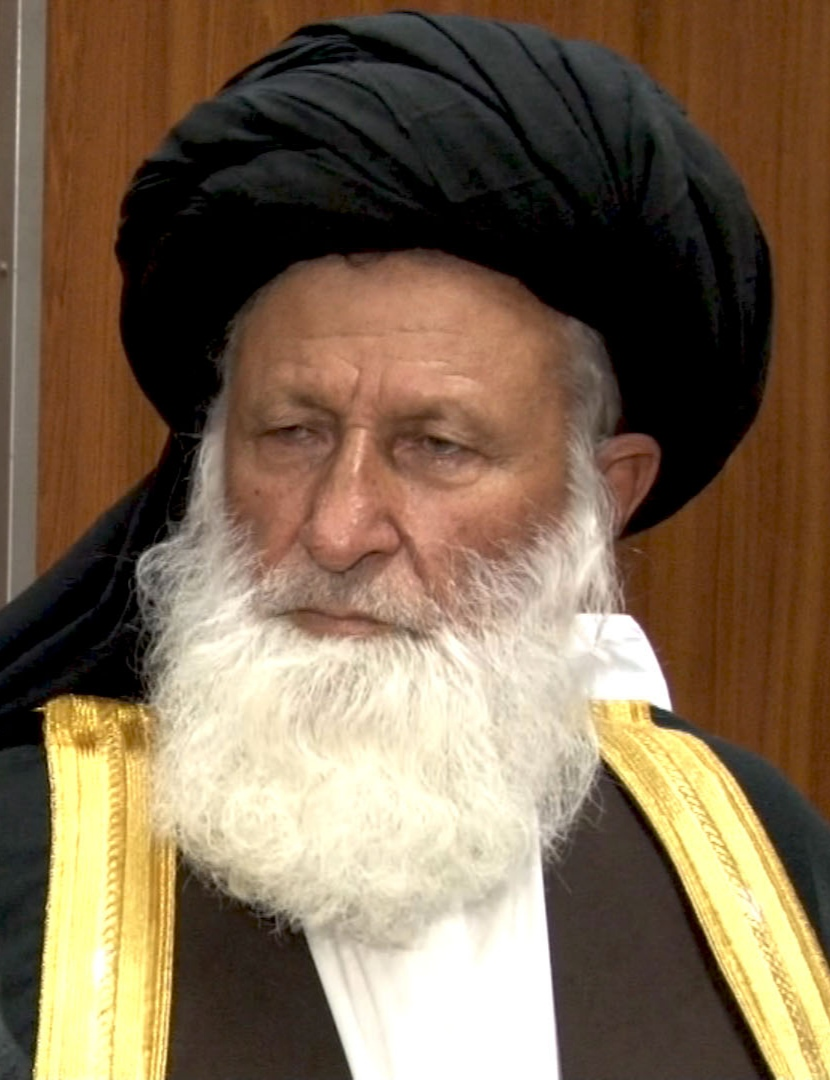
Muhammad Khan Sherani

Tashbih Sayyed, a Sunni Pakistani-American scholar, journalist, and author, was a supporter of Israel and critic of the Islamist movement. He said that Israel is vital for the stability of the region. Sayyed praised the treatment of Arabs in Israel, and applauded the "strength of the Jewish spirit that refuses to give in to evil forces despite thousand of years of anti-Semitism". He concluded by saying "I am convinced that it is true that God created this earth but it is also a fact that only an Israel can keep this earth from dying". Tashbih condemned the press that portrays the Israelis as villains, and "chooses to ignore all rules of ethical journalism when it comes to Israel."

The Pakistani political and religious leader Muhammad Khan Sherani, announced in 2020 that he supports normalization or relations with Israel, saying that the "Quran and history prove that the Land of Israel belongs to the Jews".

=== United Kingdom ===
Ed Husain a former radical Islamist and author of The Islamist, a book about Islamic fundamentalism and an account of his five years as a radical Islamist activist. Husain also cofounded, with Maajid Nawaz, the counter-extremism organisation the Quilliam Foundation. He is currently senior fellow at the Council on Foreign Relations in New York City. Husain supports a two-state solution to end the Israel-Palestinian conflict. Husain has condemned suicide bombing of Israeli civilians as well as the "killing of Palestinian civilians by the Hamas-led Gazan government". He is opposed to the international boycott of Israel by activists, stating in The New York Times that:

Many people condemn Israeli settlements and call for an economic boycott of their produce, but I saw that it was Arab builders, plumbers, taxi drivers and other workers who maintained Israeli lifestyles. Separatism in the Holy Land has not worked and it is time to end it. How much longer will we punish Palestinians to create a free Palestine?

Tufail Ahmad is a British Muslim intellectual who has criticised antisemitism in Islam and written positive articles on Israel's democratic system of government.

=== United States ===
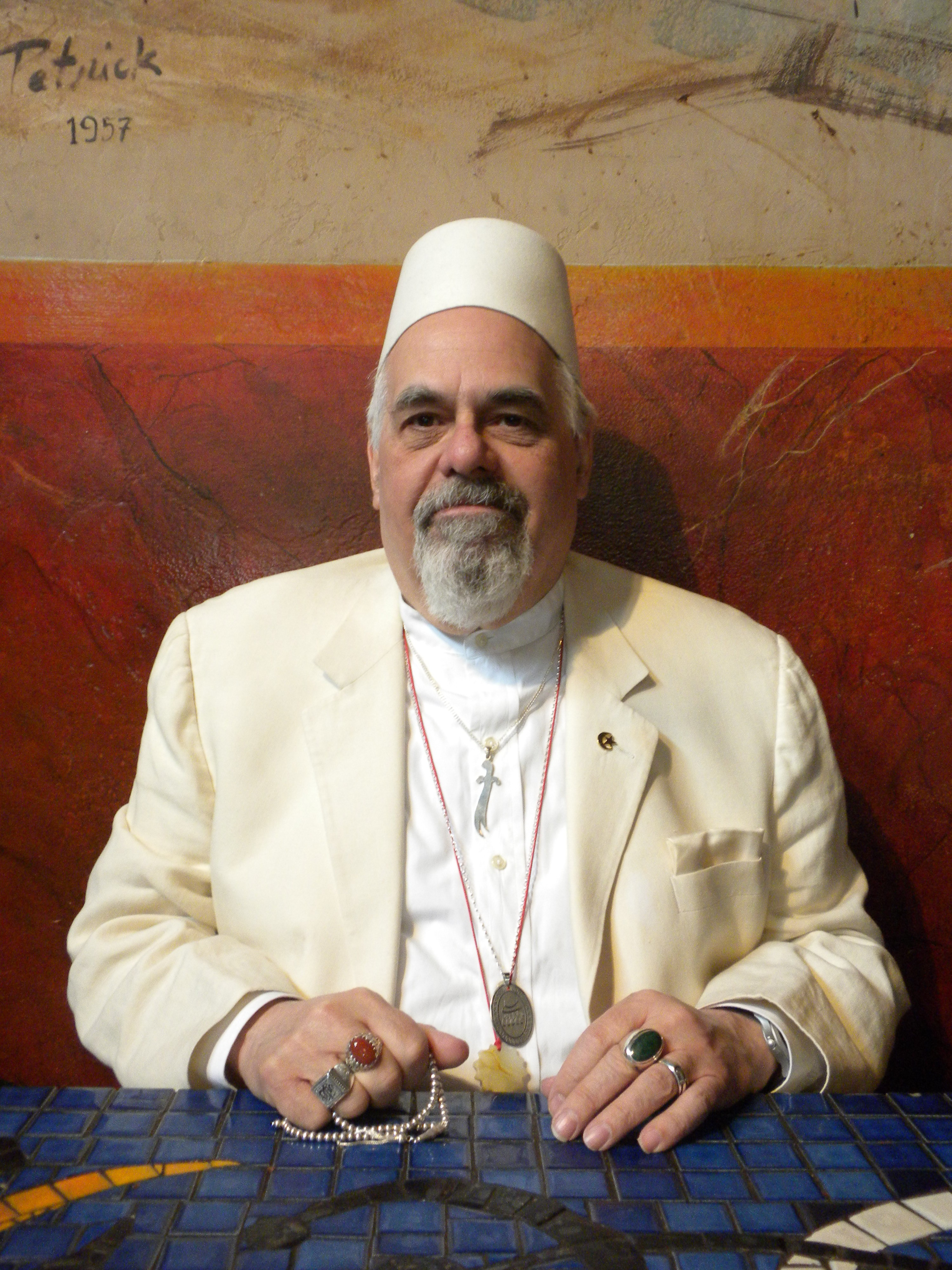
Lulu Schwartz, a Jewish-American, converted Muslim author, contends that Israel is the historic, sacred land of the Jews, given to the Jews by God "as their eternal home".

The American-Islamic Forum for Democracy (AIFD) was formed in March 2003. The group advocates a liberal Islam, compatible with democracy and American values. The AIFD publicly supports Israel, stating "it is necessary to make a foundational position statement regarding the state of Israel. We stand in support of the existing unqualified recognition of the state of Israel behind internationally recognized borders".

The group's founder, M. Zuhdi Jasser, a former Lieutenant Commander in the United States Navy, said that Muslims need to recognize Israel as a state, to stand against radical Islamist groups by name, not by theory, tactic, or condemning terrorism, but by name—Hamas, Al Qaeda and other groups. Jasser calls political Islamism "the root cause of Islamist terrorism" and a matter on which it is "time to take sides." An outspoken supporter of Israel, Jasser warned against what he sees as the increasing threats of Radical Islam to the West: "Israel has always been a canary in the coal mine, dealing with the threat of radical Islam. Now each country is going to have to deal with it".

During the 2006 Lebanon War, Jasser defended Israel's actions, and wrote "I have no reason to believe that Israel is not doing anything but just protecting itself from forces that are using homes north of it to bomb northern Israel". Afdhere Jama, an American-Muslim writer and editor of the Huriyah magazine, added, "My main difference with the majority of Muslims is the belief that a Jewish homeland is an important progress for all of us, especially one in their ancestral land of Israel". He continued, "Muslims in the United States must decide whether they see groups like Hamas and Hizbullah as legitimate resistance or the cause of Muslim troubles in the region".

Khaleel Mohammed, an associate professor of Religion at San Diego State University (SDSU), attracted attention for a 2004 interview in which he stated that based on the Qur'an, Israel belongs to the Jews. Mohammed said that the Qur'an never mentions Jerusalem as a holy city, and added, "It's in the Muslim consciousness that the land first belonged to the Jews. It doesn't matter if the Jews were exiled 500 years or 2000 years, the Holy Land, as mentioned in Quran belongs to Moses and his people, the Jews."

Stephen Suleyman Schwartz, an American Muslim author, and adherent of the Hanafi school of Islam, contends that Israel is the historic, sacred land of the Jews, given to the Jews by God "as their eternal home".

Qanta A. Ahmed, a British-born Pakistani Muslim who today lives in New York, is a staunch defender of Israel, who has been accused by her critics of being a "Zionist in a Muslim guise". She is firmly opposed to the boycott against Israel, saying that the movement attempts to vilify Israel in almost every argument. While opposing the continued occupation of the Palestinian Territories, Ahmed admits that she doesn't know how Israel can currently relinquish control over a region hosting "a virulent Jihadist ideology" and leaders calling for her own destruction.

Wafa Sultan, who emigrated to the U.S. from Syria in 1989, said in 2006, "The Jews have come from the tragedy (of the Holocaust), and forced the world to respect them, with their knowledge, not with their terror, with their work, not their crying and yelling. Humanity owes most of the discoveries and science of the 19th and 20th centuries to Jewish scientists. 15 million people, scattered throughout the world, united and won their rights through work and knowledge. We have not seen a single Jew blow himself up in a German restaurant. We have not seen a single Jew destroy a church. We have not seen a single Jew protest by killing people."

Enes Kanter, a Turkish-American professional basketball player known for his criticism of the Turkish and Chinese governments, was listed in April 2021 as "one of the leading pro-Israel influencers online". He attended an event hosted by diplomats from the US, UAE, Bahrain, and Israel on September the same year celebrating the anniversary of the Abraham Accords, which marked normalisation of relations between Israel and the two Arab countries. In November 2020, Kanter also met with Israeli diplomat Gilad Erdan and talked of joining forces to combat antisemitism.

== Zionist interpretations of the Qur'an ==
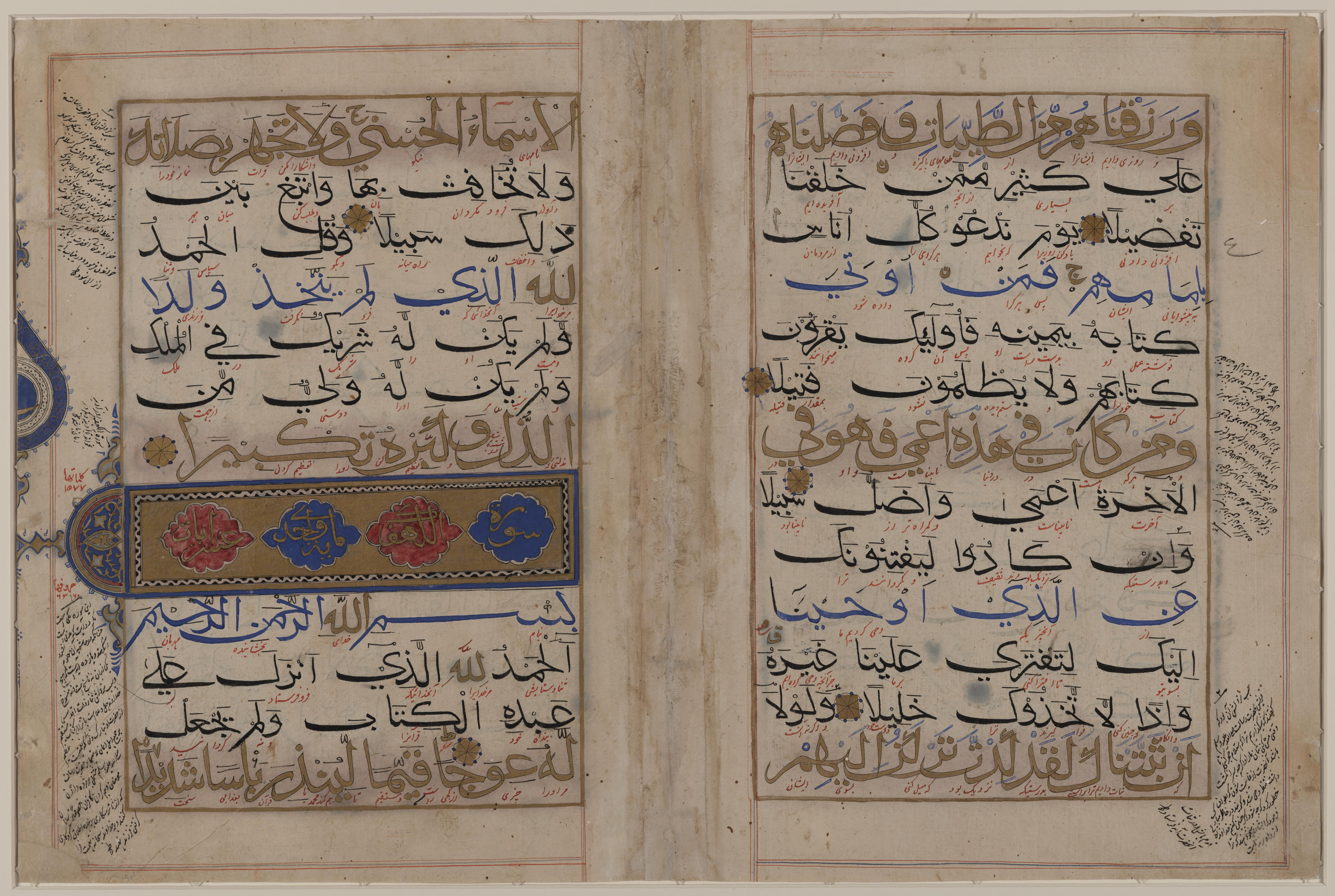
Surat Bani Isra'il (The Children of Israel), also known as Surat al-Isra'. According to Khaleel Mohammed, an Islamic Law scholar, medieval exegetes of the Qur'an, such as Ibn Kathir, interpreted this Sura as saying that the land of Israel is promised to the Jews

Several Muslim supporters of Israel believe the Quran regards Palestine as Jewish land.

Imam Abdul Hadi Palazzi, leader of Italian Muslim Assembly and a co-founder and a co-chairman of the Islam-Israel Fellowship, quotes the Qur'an to support Judaism's special connection to the Temple Mount. According to Palazzi, "The most authoritative Islamic sources affirm the Temples." He adds that Jerusalem is sacred to Muslims because of its prior holiness to Jews and its standing as home to the biblical prophets and kings David and Solomon, all of whom he says are sacred figures also in Islam. He claims that the Qur'an "expressly recognizes that Jerusalem plays the same role for Jews that Mecca has for Muslims".

When asked what the Qur'an says about the State of Israel, Palazzi replied:

The Qur'an cannot deal with the State of Israel as we know it today, since that State only came into existence in 1948, i.e. many centuries after the Qur'an itself was revealed. However, the Qur'an specifies that the Land of Israel is the homeland of the Jewish people, that God Himself gave that Land to them as heritage and ordered them to live therein. It also announces that – before the end of time – the Jewish people will come from many different countries to retake possession of that heritage of theirs. Whoever denies this actually denies the Qur'an itself. If he is not a scholar, and in good faith believes what other people say about this issue, he is an ignorant Muslim. If, on the contrary, he is informed about what the Qur'an and openly opposes it, he ceases to be a Muslim.

Khaleel Mohammed, Islamic Law scholar of the San Diego State University, noted that Sura 5 verse 21 of the Qur'an, and the medieval exegetes of the Qur'an, say that Israel belongs to the Jews. He translates it thus:

[Moses said]: O my people! Enter the Holy Land which God has written for you, and do not turn tail, otherwise you will be losers." Mohammed here understands "written" to mean this is the final word from God on the subject. In reaction, he was inundated with hate mail.

And We said to the Children of Israel after Pharaoh, “Reside in the land, but when the promise of the Hereafter comes to pass, We will bring you all together.”

— Surah Al-Isra 17:104

And ˹remember˺ when Moses said to his people, “O my people! ...Enter the Holy Land which Allah has destined for you ˹to enter˺. And do not turn back or else you will become losers.”

— Surah Al-Ma'idah 5:20–107

According to British-based Imam Muhammad Al-Hussaini, traditional commentators from the 8th and 9th century onwards have uniformly interpreted the Qur'an to say explicitly that the Land of Israel has been given by God to the Jewish people as a perpetual covenant. Hussaini bases his argument upon Qur'an 5:21 in which Moses declares: "O my people, enter the Holy Land which God has prescribed for you, and turn not back in your traces, to turn about losers." He cites the Qur'an commentator Muhammad ibn Jarir al-Tabari, who says that this statement is "a narrative from God... concerning the saying of Moses... to his community from among the children of Israel and his order to them according to the order of God to him, ordering them to enter the holy land." He argued that this promise to the Jews is ever lasting, and further said: "It was never the case during the early period of Islam... that there was any kind of sacerdotal attachment to Jerusalem as a territorial claim." This interpretation of the promise to the Jews as ever-lasting is not uniformly accepted by all Islamic commentators

According to a translation by the Islamic Law scholar Khaleel Mohammed, Ibn Kathir (1301–1373) interpreted Qur'an 5:20–21 using the following terms: That which God has written for you' i.e. That which God has promised to you by the words of your father Israel that it is the inheritance of those among you who believe."

== Reactions ==
In Bangladesh, Salah Uddin Shoaib Choudhury, editor of the Weekly Blitz newspaper and self–described "Muslim Zionist", was attacked and beaten in 2006 by a mob of nearly 40 people, leaving him with a fractured ankle. During the assault, the attackers shouted at Choudhury, labeling him an "agent of the Jews."

In 2011, Alaa Alsaegh, a Muslim from Iraq who posted online a poem expressing support for Jewish people in Israel, was reportedly attacked in St. Louis, with a Star of David allegedly being carved into his back.

Kuwaiti journalist Abdullah al-Hadlaq was recently arrested and jailed for three years after complaints were filed against him by the country's Electronic and Cyber Crime Combatting Department.

== See also ==
- Arab satellite lists
- Dalia Ziada
- Luai Ahmed
- Loay Alshareef
- Magdi Allam
- Nonie Darwish

== Bibliography ==
- Cohen, Hillel (2009), Army of Shadows: Palestinian Collaboration with Zionism, 1917–1948, University of California Press.
- Ma’oz, Moshe (2010), Muslim attitudes to Jews and Israel: the ambivalences of rejection, antagonism, tolerance and cooperation, Sussex Academic Press
