= Censorship in the West Bank =

Censorship in the West Bank is the practice of controlling the content of what media within the West Bank were permitted to state, and what was, in various periods, denied free expression.

== Jordanian occupation, 1948–1967 ==
Following the 1948 Arab–Israeli War, the West Bank came under Jordanian occupation and was annexed by Jordan in 1950. During this period, the West Bank press was subject to licensing, censorship and periodic closures. During the Jordanian military administration in 1949–1950, journalists were arrested and newspapers were closed for publishing critical articles. The 1953 Press and Publications Law gave the government broad authority to refuse or revoke licenses on national-security and other grounds. In 1953, Filastin was closed for two days and the Bethlehem monthly Al-Mahad for one month; in early 1955, six newspapers and magazines were closed for six months. Restrictions also included the confiscation of newspapers, seizure of printing equipment, and pressure on newspaper distributors.

== Israeli occupation, 1967–present ==
In the West Bank both the British Mandatory "Defense Emergency Regulations of 1945, No. 88" – stipulating that "every article, picture, advertisement, decree and death notice must be submitted to military censors", – and "Israeli Military Order No. IOI (1967)", amended by "Order No. 718 (1977)" and "No. 938 (1981)" concerning "the prohibition of incitement and adverse propaganda" formed the basis for censoring West Bank publications, poetry and literary productions. The problem was that no guidelines clarified precisely what could or could not be said, and even articles translated directly from the Hebrew press could be prohibited, or love poems free of any nationalistic undertone could be suppressed from publication by a censor, or theatrical pieces approved in Israel could be blocked by arbitrary fiat by any military governor, or staging denied by simply not replying to requests for permission. Newspapers could lose their licenses, without any reason given, on the basis of 1945 Emergency Regulation (Article 92/2). There were two distinct censorship bureaus, one run by the military and the other by the civil administration, and what was allowed by one could be overturned by the other, and this double procedure applied to galley proofs of every article in newspapers. In the first decades of occupation, Palestinian publications were vetted and numerous books were censored to remove any phrase or expression which was considered as "incitement" or fostering national feelings among the Palestinians. Thus even obituaries stating that a family "in the homeland and the diaspora mourns" the deceased was struck out. Coverage of Israel's 1982 invasion of Lebanon in Jerusalem's Arabic papers, and particularly condolence notices, were severely curtailed. The word "pride" used in an obituary for the fallen was objected to. Editors were harassed and papers closed for containing articles critical of settlements.

Censorship even extended to denying travel permits for notable Palestinians like Elias Freij, Major of Bethlehem, scheduled to be interviewed in the US on NBC's Meet the Press. That war, according to several Israeli observers like Ze'ev Schiff, Yehoshafat Harkabi and Avner Yaniv, was itself strategically motivated as necessary to "safeguard the occupation of the West Bank." When Yitzhak Laor appealed to the Israeli Supreme Court about the way the censorship board censored his play – which made analogies between the military government in the territory and Nazism, the Court backed the plaintiff, leading to the board's suspension. The court's decision had no effect on the military's censorship body in the West Bank and Gaza, and plays can be closed if it is thought their content threatens Israel's security. Graffiti (shi'arati) are a major medium for protesting occupation and flourished under the First Intifada. They were illegal by the fact that they were written without obtaining a permit. Julie Peteet states that "it was illegal to write for public dissemination without submission of the text to the censors". Under Military Order 1260 promulgated in November 1988, Israeli military authorities could fine $350 the owner of any property on whose walls the graffiti artist had written a slogan or painted a picture. This proved to be so lucrative a source of revenue for the Israelis that the intifada authorities themselves had to prohibit the practice. (Note: In 1991, the United National Leadership (UNL) issued a directive in a bayan (leaflet) that forbade writing graffiti on private property. Israel was collecting too much revenue from fining owners of walls with graffiti (Peteet 1996, pp. 156, n.9, 157, n.21).) Soldiers blacked out or scrubbed walls of graffiti, or when incised, had them chiselled off: when book-long collections of such graffiti were published, they were banned by the military censor. Even works unrelated to the conflict have been banned in the occupied territories, as was Hamlet. Fathi Ghabin received a 6-month jail sentence for using the PLO colours – red, black, green, and white – in one of his paintings.

== Under the Palestinian Authority, 1995–present ==
The Palestinian National Authority also uses censorship. As early as 1996 it forbade circulation of Edward Said's Peace and Its Discontents. A 2011 Human Rights Watch (HRW) report mentioned various restrictions on journalists and government critics. The report highlights detention and interrogation of journalists by the PA's Preventive Security and General Intelligence agencies, it also brings up cases of physical abuse, and damage or confiscation of equipment. Some journalists were targeted after criticizing the PA or because they were believed to support rival political parties, particularly Hamas. The report found that this pressure from the security services had led some journalists in the West Bank to practice self-censorship.

In June 2017, PA ordered internet service providers in the West Bank to block access to 29 websites, including opposition and independent news outlets. The following month, President Mahmoud Abbas issued the Electronic Crimes Law by decree. The law imposed penalties for online expression deemed to threaten public order, national unity or social peace. Amnesty International reported that six journalists were arrested in August and that at least six people had been detained and charged under the new law since it took effect.

The law drew criticism from Palestinian and international human rights organizations: In December 2017, Amnesty International, Human Rights Watch, Avaaz and 7amleh jointly called for further amendments, arguing that the law allowed disproportionate restrictions on freedom of expression and privacy, including website blocking and surveillance. The Palestinian Centre for Human Rights called for the law's suspension and eventual repeal, citing vague provisions, excessive penalties and restrictions on freedom of expression. Al-Haq also criticized the law for restricting freedom of expression, privacy and access to information, and objected to provisions allowing websites to be blocked on broadly defined grounds. These objections led to the law being amended in 2018.

In May 2019 HRW cited PA reports showing that security forces had arrested 752 people over social media posts between January 2018 and March 2019, and 815 people were charged under the Electronic Crimes Law during 2018. According to HRW, at least some of these cases involved peaceful criticism of the PA or its officials. In October 2019, a court in Ramallah ordered internet service providers to block 52 websites and webpages, including 25 news outlets identified by the Committee to Protect Journalists. These included independent media organizations and outlets associated with Hamas and supporters of Mohammed Dahlan.

Following the death of government critic Nizar Banat in PA custody in June 2021, security forces dispersed demonstrations demanding accountability and detained protesters. In November 2022, PA security forces prevented activists from holding a conference on political reform in Ramallah and subsequently shut down a press conference organized to protest the restrictions. HRW reported that the PA continued to arbitrarily detain critics, including students and journalists, during 2024. In January 2025, the PA suspended Al Jazeera's operations in the West Bank, citing allegedly inflammatory content. The Committee to Protect Journalists condemned the suspension and called for it to be reversed. In October 2025, PA security forces detained journalist Sami al-Sa'i in Tulkarm over a post critical of the authority that he had shared in a private WhatsApp group. He was released on bail three days later.

== Sources ==
- Benvenisti, Eyal (1984). Israeli Censorship of Arab Publications: A Survey (PDF). New York: Human Rights Watch.
- Cantarow, Ellen (Summer–Autumn 1982). "The War for the West Bank". Journal of Palestine Studies. 11–12 (4): 263–268. doi:10.1525/jps.1982.11-12.4-1.263. JSTOR 2538371.
- Finkelstein, Norman (Winter 1991). "Israel and Iraq: A Double Standard". Journal of Palestine Studies. 20 (2): 43–56. doi:10.2307/2537197. JSTOR 2537197.
- Friedman, Robert (Autumn 1983). "Israeli Censorship of the Palestinian Press". Journal of Palestine Studies. 13 (1): 93–101. doi:10.2307/2536927. JSTOR 2536927.
- Imseis, Ardi (Autumn 2000). "Review: Law, Reality, and the Oslo 'Peace' Process". Oxford Journal of Legal Studies. 20 (3): 469–476. doi:10.1093/ojls/20.3.469. JSTOR 20468333.
- Peteet, Julie (May 1996). "The Writing on the Walls: The Graffiti of the Intifada". Cultural Anthropology. 11 (2): 139–159. doi:10.1525/can.1996.11.2.02a00010. JSTOR 656446.
- Slyomovics, Susan (Summer 1991). ""To Put One's Fingers in the Bleeding Wound": Palestinian Theatre under Israeli Censorship". The Drama Review. 35 (2): 18–38. doi:10.2307/1146087. JSTOR 1146087.
- Human Rights Watch (6 April 2011). "No News is Good News: Abuses against Journalists by Palestinian Security Forces".
- Shinar, Dov (1987). Palestinian Voices: Communication and Nation Building in the West Bank. Boulder, Colorado: Lynne Rienner Publishers. ISBN 0-931477-41-7.
- Amnesty International; Avaaz; Human Rights Watch; 7amleh (20 December 2017). "Joint Letter to the Secretary General of the Council of Ministers Salah Alayan About the Law on Electronic Crimes". Human Rights Watch.
- Palestinian Centre for Human Rights (20 September 2017). "Position Paper Issued Following Workshop on Media Freedoms in Light of PCHR's Legal Review of Electronic Crimes Law".
- Al-Haq (25 January 2018). "Al-Haq's Comments on the Draft Law by Decree Amending the Law by Decree on Cybercrimes".
- Human Rights Watch (29 May 2019). "Palestine: No Letup in Arbitrary Arrests, Torture".
- Committee to Protect Journalists (25 October 2019). "Palestinian court orders block of dozens of news websites and Facebook pages".
- Human Rights Watch (28 November 2022). "Palestinian Authority Muzzles Call for Reform, Elections".
- Human Rights Watch (2025). "World Report 2025: Israel and Palestine".
- Committee to Protect Journalists (1 January 2025). "CPJ urges Palestinian Authority to lift ban on Al Jazeera's operations in West Bank".
- Committee to Protect Journalists (20 October 2025). "Ceasefire brings some calm but not safety for journalists in Gaza, West Bank".
- Amnesty International (23 August 2017). "Palestine: Dangerous escalation in attacks on freedom of expression".
- Human Rights Watch (20 December 2017). "Palestine: Reform Restrictive Cybercrime Law".
- United Nations High Commissioner for Human Rights (2019). Human rights situation in the Occupied Palestinian Territory, including East Jerusalem (PDF) (Report).
