= Muslim National Associations =

The Muslim National Associations (MNA) (Note: Among them was al-Jam'iyya al-Islamiyya al-Wataniyya (Arabic: الجمعية الاسلامية الوطنية), founded in 1921, and was active until 1923.) was a Zionist-inspired and funded organization founded in Mandatory Palestine in the 1920s. It had branch offices in a number of Palestinian towns, and was led by the mayor of Haifa, Hassan Bey Shukri and Sheikh Musa Hadeib, head of the farmers' party of Mount Hebron.

According to the Israeli historian Benny Morris, the organization was Zionist-supported and formed as a counterweight to the nationalistic and anti-Zionist Muslim-Christian associations which had been formed in opposition to the Balfour Declaration and the creation of a Jewish National Home in Palestine.

== Members ==
The organisation consisted of Arabs who were employed by the Palestine Zionist Executive and was organised by Haim Margaliot-Kalvarisky (1868–1947) (Note: He was a Jewish representative on a three-member Land Commission appointed in August 1920 by Herbert Samuel, the first British High Commissioner of Palestine, to assess state land in Palestine. Kalvarisky was a senior, European-born Palestine Jewish Colonization Association (PJCA) official who settled in the Galilee in the mid-1890s. Chaim Margalioth Kalvarisky (Kalvaryski)) who headed its Arab Department. According to Huneidi, Kalvarisky had sought elements among the Arab political elite who opposed the Arab Executive Committee based on running personal and family feuds.

Hassan Bey Shukri was the mayor of Haifa and became the president of the Muslim National Associations. Musa Hadeib, from the village of Dawaymeh near Hebron, was also head of the Mount Hebron farmers' party.

== See also ==
- Arab satellite lists
- Muslim supporters of Israel
