= Karmei Katif =

Communal settlement in southern Israel

Karmei Katif: כרמי קטיף (Hebrew)
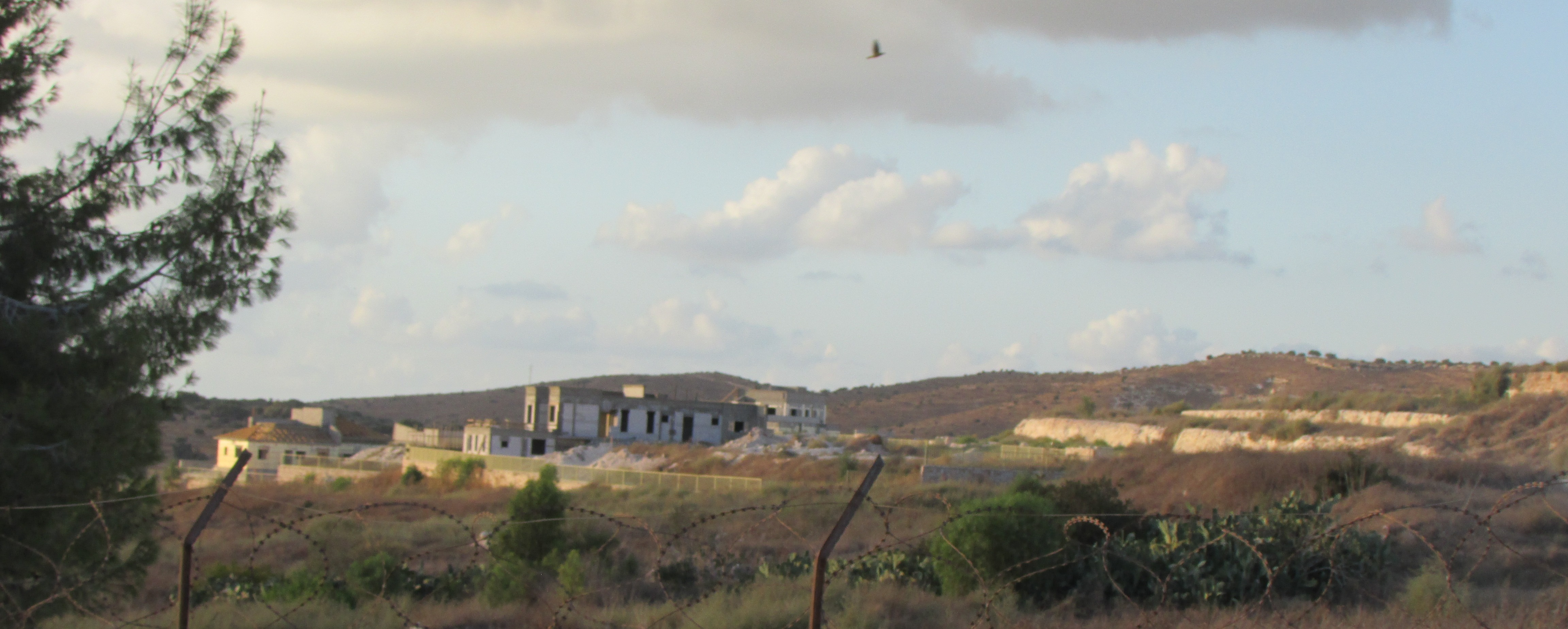

- Location within Ashkelon region of Israel
- Coordinates: 31°32′15″N 34°54′43″E
- Country: Israel
- District: Southern
- Subdistrict: Ashkelon
- Council: Lakhish
- Founded: 2016
- Population (2024): 833

Karmei Katif (Hebrew: כרמי קטיף) is a communal settlement in southern Israel. Located close to the Green Line of the southern West Bank, it falls under the jurisdiction of Lakhish Regional Council. In 2024 it had a population of 833.

== History ==
Archaeological work at the site has uncovered evidence of ancient settlements dating from the Bronze Age, Iron Age, and the Persian and Hellenistic periods, through to the Ottoman era. Discoveries also include a columbarium cave, a hiding tunnel, and a villa from the Second Temple period that once belonged to a Jewish man.

The village was established in 2016 by former residents of the Katif settlement who had left the Gaza Strip as a result of the disengagement plan. Between the disengagement and the building of the new village, the founders lived in the moshav of Amatzia directly to the south of Karmei Katif. The village was built on the site of the Palestinian village of al-Dawayima, the site of the al-Dawayima massacre during the 1948 Arab–Israeli War.
