= Kasim Hafeez =

British activist

Kasim Hafeez is a British citizen of Pakistani heritage. He is a speaker, writer, Zionist and pro-Israel activist. He now lives in Winnipeg, Manitoba in Canada.

== Early life ==
Hafeez was born in December 1983 to Muslim Pakistani parents and grew up in Nottingham, England, in a predominantly Pakistani Muslim neighbourhood. While he states that his community was not particularly radical, but rather a hardworking new immigrant community of devout Pakistani Muslims, "antisemitism was always in the background". Hafeez claims that in his household the most radical antisemitism came from his own father who would praise Adolf Hitler.

== Radicalism ==
Hafeez says that, growing up at a very turbulent time for the Muslim world, there were monumental shifts taking place in the Muslim community where he lived. He states that Muslims became politically mobilized following two seminal events: the publication of Salman Rushdie's book The Satanic Verses in the UK in 1988, and the war in Bosnia. Claiming that he became radicalized in his teen years from the propaganda being fed to him by radical groups and the casual organization he grew up around, he eventually became drawn to radical groups and embraced anti-Israel and antisemitic ideas. As a student at the University of Nottingham, Hafeez joined the Islamic Society where, he says, images of death and destruction perpetrated by Israel against the Palestinians were regularly screened at meetings. The images were never contextualized or interpreted, serving merely to fuel pre-existing hatred, he says.

== Israel activism ==
The turning point for Hafeez occurred when he came across Alan Dershowitz's The Case for Israel in a bookshop. He told the Times of Israel:

“I told myself that I would read his arguments, easily refute them, and that would be that".

But refutation of Dershowitz's arguments proved to be rather difficult for Hafeez. Following months of intensive research on the history of Israel and the conflict, he was so emotionally distraught that he had to leave his work and his studies.

Eventually Hafeez traveled to Israel in 2007 to see the reality, by his own admission still hoping to have his previous ideas validated. But what he saw in Israel had a life changing affect. He describes this in the Israeli newspaper Y-net:

"I did not encounter an apartheid racist state, but rather, quite the opposite. I was confronted by synagogues, mosques, and churches, by Jews and Arabs living together, by minorities playing huge parts in all areas of Israeli life, from the military to the judiciary. It was shocking and eye-opening. This wasn't the evil Zionist Israel that I had been told about."

"I saw a raucous, modern, liberal democracy, full of flaws, certainly, but fundamentally decent...Too many people on this planet are consumed with the same hatred that consumed me. They have been taught to despise the Jewish State - many Muslims by their religion, many others by their college professors or student groups.

According to Hafeez, it is "far from easy being a Zionist Muslim in England". Hafeez said he has been marginalized by his community and family. Hafeez visited university campuses around the UK presenting his talk, "The Day I Stopped Hating Israel – Confessions of an ex-Radical." In an interview with the Jewish Telegraph, Hafeez said: "It's not about being pro-Israel or pro-truth, I just want the facts to be heard. Israel is a democratic state. Muslims in Israel have more rights than possibly most Muslims in the Arab world and then there is the reality of the actual conflict. In the UK, most of us can't impact what will happen in Israel, we can't stop rockets falling from Gaza or forge a peace process, but we can tackle the delegitimization and demonization of Israel."

He went on to found the Israel Campaign which he closed in 2013 as he felt there were enough resources available and he did not need to duplicate efforts. Hafeez has spoken throughout the world including at the 2013 The Global Forum for Combating Antisemitism. He has appeared on radio and television and print media.

Hafeez is an outspoken advocate of Israel's right to exist and, since 2021, has maintained a weekly podcast during which he discusses issues related to Israel and the middle east. He has been especially vocal regarding the "heinous October 7 massacre" and the "horrific extent of Hamas’s vicious sexual violence against Israeli women". Likewise, he is critical of "young Americans cheering on violence against Jews".

== Christians United For Israel ==
At some point in 2014 Hafeez joined the staff of Christians United for Israel and is still employed there now. With CUFI he has continued to speak on campuses and be published in print media.

In March 2019 Hafeez addressed the United Nations Human Rights Council, calling out the bias against Israel while referencing his own experiences of being told lies about the Jewish state.

Working for a Christian organization has raised questions about Hafeez's faith, while some written pieces as recent as March 2019 state that Hafeez is a Muslim. in his own social media he says that he is not a Muslim and does not want to be referred to as a Muslim Zionist. Hafeez now considers himself a Christian.
