= Abdul Hadi Palazzi =

Italian Muslim imam

Sheikh Abdul Hadi Palazzi
- شيخ عبد الهادي بالاتسي

Personal life
- Born: Massimo Palazzi

Religious life
- Religion: Islam

Muslim leader
- Based in: Rome, Italy

Abdul Hadi Palazzi (Arabic: شيخ عبد الهادي بالاتسي), legally named Massimo Palazzi (born 24 January 1961) is the secretary general of the Italian Muslim Assembly, and the Khalifah for Europe of the Qadiri Sufi Order. Controversially in Muslim circles, as of April 2010, he not only supported Israel's right to exist but also encouraged Jews to settle in Hebron.

== Biography ==
Palazzi was born in Rome, Italy to an Italian Catholic father who converted to Sunni Islam and a Sunni Muslim mother of Syrian descent. After completing his secular and religious education in Rome and Cairo in 1987, he served as an Imam for the Italian Islamic Community. In addition to numerous master's degrees, Palazzi holds a Ph.D. in Islamic Sciences from the Institute for Islamic Studies and Research in Naples.

He was appointed a member of the board of directors of the Italian Muslim Association in 1989, and is now the secretary general of the Sunni Muslim Organization: Italian Muslim Assembly Since 1991, he is a director of the Cultural Institute of the Italian Islamic Community, with a program based on the development of Islamic education in Italy, refutation of fundamentalism and fanaticism, and deep involvement in inter-religious dialogue, especially with Jews and Christians, but also with Buddhists and others.

In 1997, Palazzi joined the International Council of the Root and Branch Association and his essay entitled "The Jewish-Moslem Dialogue and the Question of Jerusalem" was published by the Institute of the World Jewish Congress.

He has also been a lecturer in the Department of the History of Religion at the Università della Terza Età in Velletri, near Rome.

In 1998, Palazzi and Asher Eder (Jerusalem) co-founded the Islam-Israel Fellowship, promoting a positive Muslim attitude towards Jews and Israel based on what Palazzi believes are the authentic teachings of Muhammad as expressed in the Qur'an and the Hadith. Palazzi serves as Muslim co-chairman of the Fellowship. Eder serves as the Jewish co-chairman.

In December 2009, Palazzi visited Israel. He met with members of the Jewish community of Hebron including Noam Arnon and David Wilder and expressed sympathy for the Jewish residents. He stated that both Muslims and Jews are descendants of Abraham, who is buried at the Cave of Machpela in Hebron. He blamed "an extremist interpretation of Islam" as a source of conflict.

=== Views on Israel ===
Palazzi accepts Israel's sovereignty over the Holy Land, and says the Qur'an supports it as the will of God as a necessary prerequisite for the Final Judgment. He accepts Israel's sovereignty over Jerusalem, if the rights of other religions are protected. He quotes the Qur'an to support Judaism's special connection to the Temple Mount. According to Palazzi, "The most authoritative Islamic sources affirm the Temples,". He adds that Jerusalem is sacred to Muslims because of its prior holiness to Jews and its standing as home to the biblical prophets and kings David and Solomon, all of whom he says are sacred figures also in Islam. He claims that the Qur'an "expressly recognizes that Jerusalem plays the same role for Jews that Mecca has for Muslims".

When asked whether he see himself as a "Muslim Zionist", he replied: "If one means a Muslim who supports the right of the Jewish people to have their own independent and sovereign State, who is solidly behind the State of Israel when it is attacked by terror and when its existence in menaced, who thinks that developing friendly relations between the Muslim nations and the State of Israel is in the interest of the Muslims and of human civilization in general, then I think that the label of Muslim Zionist is appropriate.

When asked what the Qur'an says about the State of Israel, Palazzi replied:

"The Qur'an cannot deal with the State of Israel as we know it today, since that State came into existing in 1948 only, i.e., many centuries after the Qur'an itself was revealed. However, the Qur'an specifies that the Land of Israel is the homeland of the Jewish people, that God Himself gave that Land to them as heritage and ordered them to live therein. It also announces that—before the end of the time—the Jewish people will come from many different countries to retake possession of that heritage of theirs. Whoever denies this actually denies the Qur'an itself. If he is not a scholar, and in good faith believes what other people say about this issue, he is an ignorant Muslim. If, on the contrary, he is informed about what the Qur'an says and openly opposes it, he ceases to be a Muslim.

According to scholar Dina Lisnyansky, Palazzi "created his own niche. Being born into an immigrant family, he combined the democratic rights of western Europe with a love for Islam," but added his Zionist mission. As a result, "he is a radical too, but not on the radicals’ side. He is fighting everything that political Islam promotes." She explains, "One of the reasons why he is not on some blacklist in Iran is the fact that he, unlike Rushdie, has never said a negative word about Islam. To extremist interpreters of the Qur’an he doesn’t say ‘you are wrong.’ He would only say: ‘You got something wrong.’ His mission, therefore, is clearly not about reinventing Islam; it is about correcting the perspective."

=== Views on the Arab-Israeli peace process ===
Palazzi opposes the US-backed roadmap for peace on the grounds that it rewards Palestinian terrorism. He argues against calls for jihad against Israel and says there is no religious demand for Israel to give up control over Muslim holy places.

=== Views on Salafism ===
In Palazzi's view, Islam has been "hijacked" by the Salafist movement in Saudi Arabia, a "radical" reformist movement which denies the moderate understanding of the Qur'an and has taken control of Mecca and Medina. He says that oil money made a primitive and violent culture powerful on a global scale. And now, "they are reshaping Islam in accordance with their political issues."

== Publications ==
- What the Qur'an Really Says at templemount.org, undated
- The Islamists Have it Wrong Middle East Quarterly, Summer 2001, pp. 3–12
- Wahhabism, the Saudi Arabia-based puritanical heresy at the base of Islamism at eretzyisroel.org, June 2, 2002

== See also ==
- Muslim Zionism
