= Abdalla Mwidau =

Kenyan politician who served as Mayor of Mombasa and as a member of parliament

Abdalla Ndovu Mwidau
- Died: 1986
- Occupation: Politician
- Known for: Mayor of Mombasa, Member of Parliament for Likoni Constituency.
- Children: Maimuna Mwidau

Abdalla Ndovu Mwidau (died 1986) was a Kenyan politician who served as Mayor of Mombasa and as a member of parliament for the Likoni Constituency. Mwidau is noted as having been a prominent Muslim supporter of Israel.

== Career ==
After Kenya alongside a majority of African countries broke ties with Israel following the Yom Kippur War, Mwidau argued that Kenya did not receive its economic benefit in the form of foreign investment by Arab countries. In 1979, Mwidau worked on behalf of a pro-Israel information campaign directed at Muslim Americans that highlighted Israeli financial support for developing African nations.

In 1980, Mwidau criticized religious sectarianism and stated that "we African Moslems are not enemies of the Jewish community" and urged inter-religious cooperation. Mwidau criticized efforts to partition Jerusalem, arguing that it should solely serve as the capital of Israel and that dividing the city would be as inappropriate as dividing Mecca.

== Death and legacy ==
Mwidau died in 1986. His daughter, Maimuna Mwidau, is a political analyst who ran to represent the Kisauni Constituency in 2004.

== See also ==
- Muslim supporters of Israel
