= Abdul Hay Mosallam Zarara =

Palestinian artist (1933–2020)

Abdul Hay Mosallam
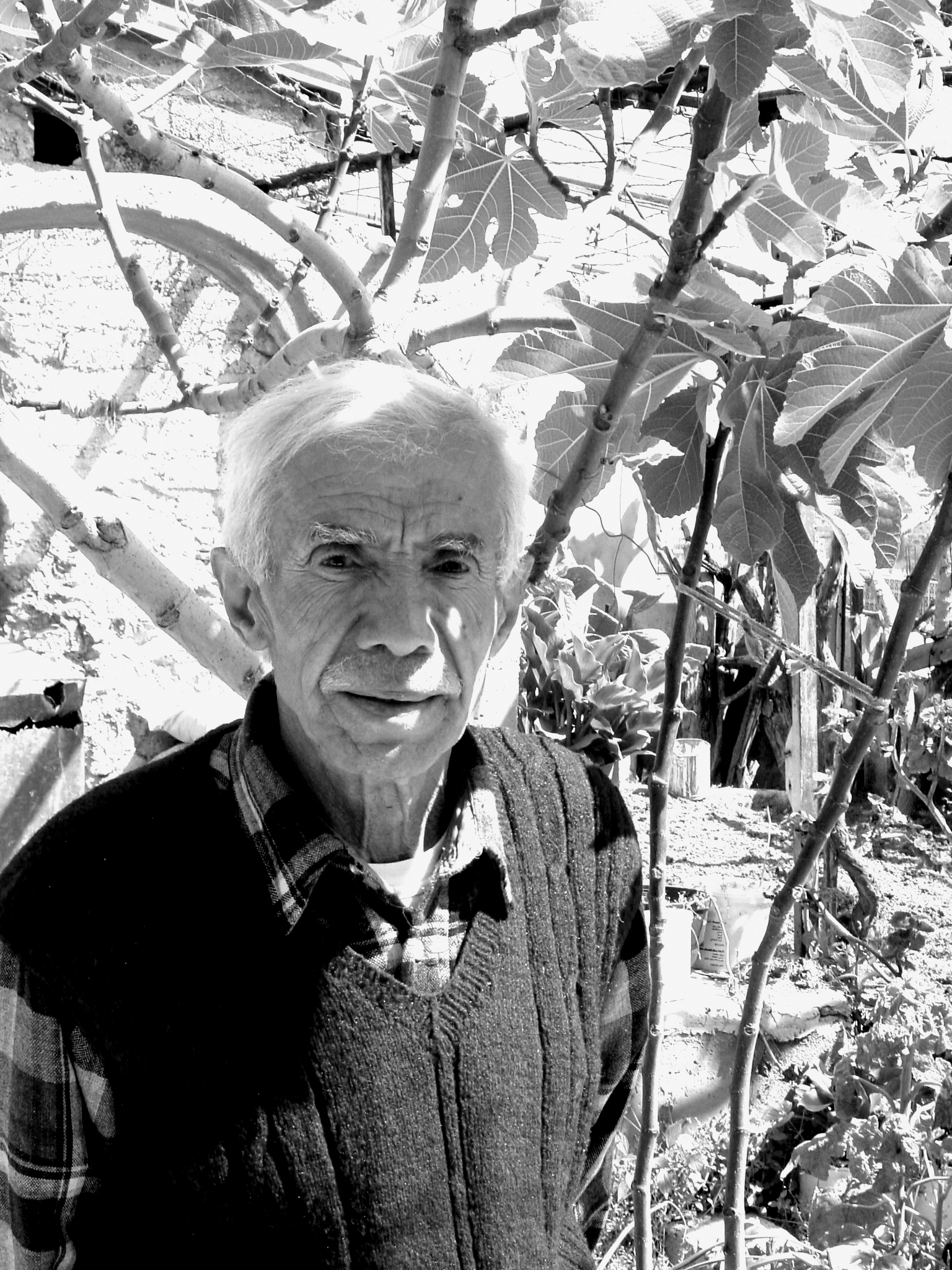
- Born: March 10, 1933; Al-Dawayima, Palestine
- Died: August 1, 2020 (aged 87); Amman, Jordan
- Occupation: Artist
- Years active: 1970s–2020
- Known for: Painting

Abdul Hay Mosallam Zarara (10 March 1933 – 1 August 2020) was a self-taught Palestinian artist who worked meticulously on archiving the recent histories of the Palestinian people. He was born in 1933 at Al-Dawayima, near Al Khalil (Hebron), in Palestine, and latterly lived and worked in Amman. Mosallam recreated scenes from daily life in his lost Palestinian home that remained vivid in his mind since his expulsion from the village of Al-Dawayima in 1948. Mosallam also produced extensive documentation of the Palestinian struggle and liberation movements in the form of painted reliefs. This “painted archive” corpus is valid as a first representation of a community writing its own history and not just showcasing it as a collection of images.

== Biography ==
Mosallam did not receive artistic training at any institution. Working with a very particular technique, based on painted reliefs, Mosallam recalled from his days in the village scenes of traditions and celebrations, and from his years in exile scenes of resistance and fighting. He worked at the maintenance department of the Jordanian Air Force before joining the Palestine Liberation Organization (PLO) in the late 1960s, which sent him and his family to Libya. While in Libya, Mosallam learned his special technique and turned to art. The hard conditions of life in the Diaspora, the struggle for Palestine, direct and artistic militance, are all factors which determined Mosallam's artistic production in both subject matter and technique. For many years he had his studio in the Palestinian quarter of Damascus, still called “the Yarmouh Camp”, together with the late Palestinian artist Mustafa Al Hallaj. From 1992 until his death in 2020 he lived and worked in Amman, Jordan.

Mosallam's subjects reflect his life, he worked while living in the refugee camps, at first in Lebanon and later in Syria. He worked under bombardment during the siege of Beirut in 1982, and he succeeded in holding an exhibition in the midst of the ruins of the city. At that time, his subjects were linked with the feelings and needs of the people who shared this hard life with him. Through his work, Abdul-Hay strengthened the resistance of a people who are struggling on all levels to survive. His paintings depict the life of the Palestinians – the village weddings, Ramadan nights, gatherings, farmers and traditional dancers, all vividly painted on detailed reliefs and inscribed with traditional songs and poems. In the works of Mosallam, the woman appears almost as the reason for life for the man. She embraces the man, often a palm tree at whose roots a man is seated playing music for her. At other times, she is a boat, naked, with long hair, carrying the man. Always, the woman appears stronger than the man as if the artist is going against the current, challenging the subordinate role of women in the Arab World.

== Technique ==
Mosallam used very simple tools and materials in line with the sparseness of his life as an exile and a fighter. A mixture of glue and sawdust makes up the reliefs. The paintings are very finely detailed, he sculpted the most minute details of body and face features. In 1986, a film, “Gold Dust”, was made by Mohammad Mawas on his works. The title of the film points to the contrasts between the poverty of the raw materials and the value of their transformation in the artist’s work.

== Artistic Value ==
Mosallam's work is a complete archive of Palestine's heritage and struggle. His work is well known in the Arab countries where he had more than 30 solo exhibitions, and participated in a great number of collective exhibitions with Arab and international artists. His work was shown in solo and group exhibitions including two in Libya (1978), six exhibitions in Damascus, one in Aleppo, Homs, Latakia, Mesyaf and Dair Attieh between 1981 and 1991. While living and exhibiting in Beirut (1980-1982) one of the exhibitions of his work was held during the 1982 siege of Beirut under the bombardment taking place on Fakahani street in west Beirut. There were many exhibitions in Amman at Darat Al Funun, Jordan National Gallery of Fine Arts, and Dar Al Anda, and in Ibrbid, Jerash and other cities, including in Tehran, Gutenberg, Helsinki and Stockholm (1983), Oslo (1981), Zurich and Bern (1990), and Houston (2003). He also exhibited at the "Jean Genet" show at Nottingham Contemporary (2011), the Sharjah Biennial (2015), "Here and Elsewhere" at the New Museum (2014), and at "Index of Tensional and Unintentional Love of Land" curated by Ala Younis who has been working closely with the artist since 2003 on documenting his work, and on indexing, archiving and digitizing his legacy. His artwork was also featured in the Palestinian art exhibition in the U.S. at the Station Museum of Contemporary Art in Houston, Texas in an exhibition titled: "Made in Palestine"; curated by Gabriel Diego Delgado and Tex Kerschen under the Directorship of Jim Harithas.

His artistic value has been recognized by American and European critics and journalists who wrote about his works in various magazines. In addition to his ongoing work, Abdul Hay dreamed of establishing a museum – not only for his own works and not only to collect works from the past, but as a place where one could house the present aspirations of his people.

Together with 33 Japanese artists, he participated in an exhibition in Tokyo about the Sabra and Shatila massacre, and many of his works have been employed internationally as posters, calendars and postcards.

== Bibliography ==
In 2006, a publication on a selection of traditional works by Abdul Hay Mosallam was compiled by artist Ala Younis and printed in Amman. The monograph titled "Palestinian Tradition in the Works of Abdul Hay Mosallam Zarara" included contextual texts written by Mosallam on what he called "The Tradition Series" مسلسل التراث. Produced in Arabic, English and German, the publication also included images from the artist's archive, press clippings, traditional songs, as well as texts by Sally Bland and Ahmed Zreik.

2001 Exhibition catalog of "Made in Palestine", published by the Ineri Foundation with partnership of the Station Museum of Contemporary Art in Houston, Texas.
