= Loay Alshareef =

Saudi Arabian peace activist

- لؤي الشريف
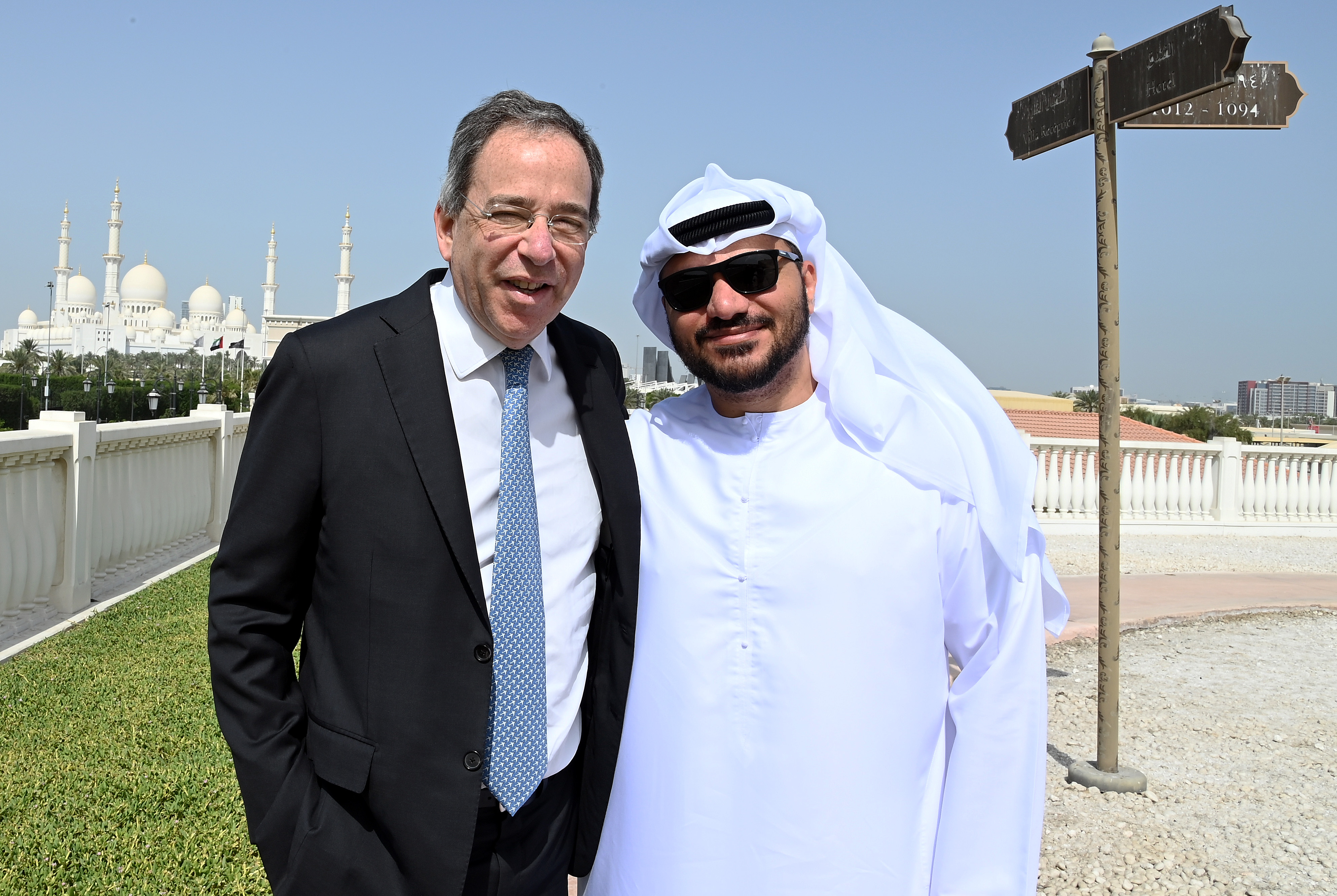
- Alshareef with US ambassador to Israel Thomas Nides in Dubai, 2022
- Born: November 11, 1982 (age 43)
- Citizenship: Egypt/Saudi Arabia
- Occupation: Peace activist/Global speaker
- Website: Instagram; YouTube

Loay Alshareef (Arabic: لؤي الشريف; born 11 November 1982) is a UAE-based Saudi-born Egyptian activist who advocates for the Arab world to normalise relations with Israel.

== Biography ==
Alshareef is a Saudi born, was born and raised in Jeddah, in a deeply religious household, to an Egyptian father and a Saudi mother. He grew up thinking that God wanted him to hate Jews and Christians.

Alshareef first met a Jew in 2010 when he traveled to Paris to study French and was placed with a Yemenite Jewish host family. He was apprehensive when he saw a Star of David in the house and realized that the residents were Jewish, at first asking the study abroad program to move him to a different house. He changed his mind after getting to know his hosts and having meals with them, learning about Judaism and Jewish holidays. When he returned to Saudi Arabia, his mindset had been permanently changed, and he became an advocate for peace and understanding between Muslims and Jews.

He started traveling to the United Arab Emirates in 2016 and has lived in Abu Dhabi since 2020. He praises the Abraham Accords and other steps taken by the UAE's government in recent years to improve openness and acceptance of different cultures. In the UAE, he and other influencers have held interfaith gatherings and meals for both Jewish and Muslim holidays. His work on dialogue has been praised by Chief Rabbi of the UAE Levi Duchman and Rabbi Yehuda Sarna.

During the Gaza war, Alshareef acknowledged that the war has made the possibility of peace more remote, but said that the war can end immediately if Hamas lays down its weapons and releases the hostages. He criticized protests against Israel in Western countries, saying the average American doesn't understand the conflict and has an unrealistic view of Hamas.

== Support for Zionism and interpretations of Islamic texts ==
Alshareef asserts that Zionism represents the right of Jews to self-determination in their ancestral homeland, a stance that he believes is supported by the Quran. He has stated, "Zionism can be defined in one line: the right of Jews to have self-determination in their ancestral homeland". He further argues that Jewish prophets are integral to Islamic tradition, suggesting that denying the Jewish connection to the land undermines Islamic faith.

== Criticism and controversy ==
Alshareef's positions have drawn criticism from various quarters. Some detractors label him a "normalizer" or a "Zionist wannabe," accusing him of promoting narratives that align closely with Israeli perspectives. Critics argue that his emphasis on Jewish claims to the land may overlook and diminish the Palestinian narrative and the complexities of the Israeli-Palestinian conflict.

Additionally, his participation in events organized by pro-Israel organizations and his appearances alongside Israeli officials have been points of contention. For instance, Alshareef has been involved with groups such as StandWithUs and has spoken at events promoting the Abraham Accords, further fueling criticism from those who view these engagements as endorsements of specific political agendas.
