= Lafi =

Lafi is a surname. Notable people with the surname include:

- Fadi Lafi (born 1979), Palestinian footballer
- Nora Lafi (born 1965), French historian of Algerian origin
- Olfa Lafi (born 1986), Tunisian race walker

== See also ==
- Michel Lafis (born 1967), Swedish cyclist
