= Al-Dawayima =

al-Dawayima الدوايمة ad-Dawayima
- Etymology: The little Dom tree
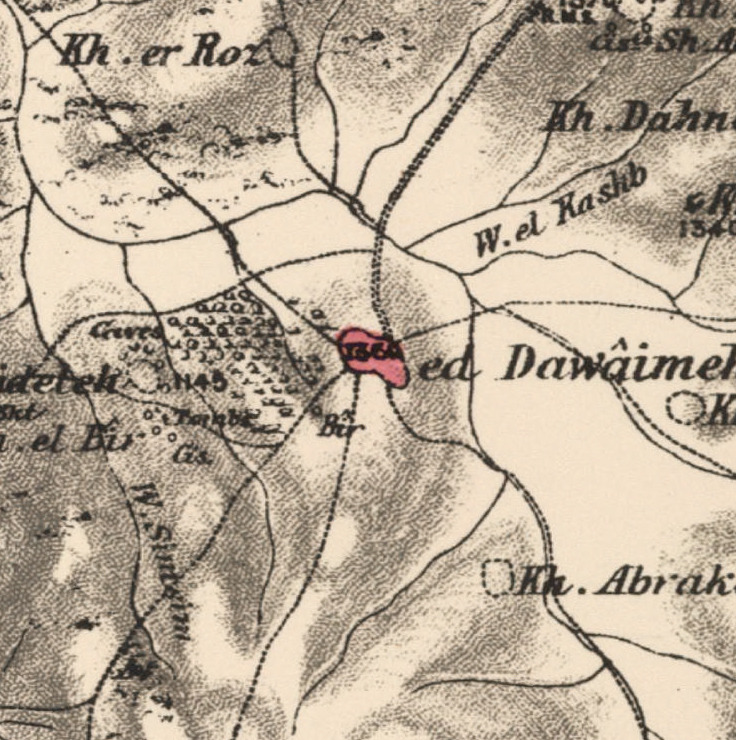
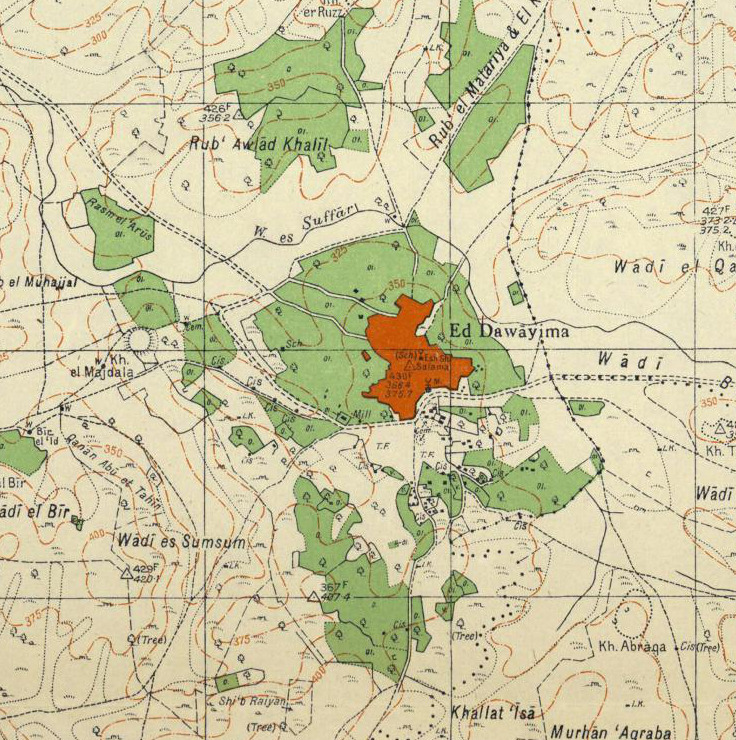
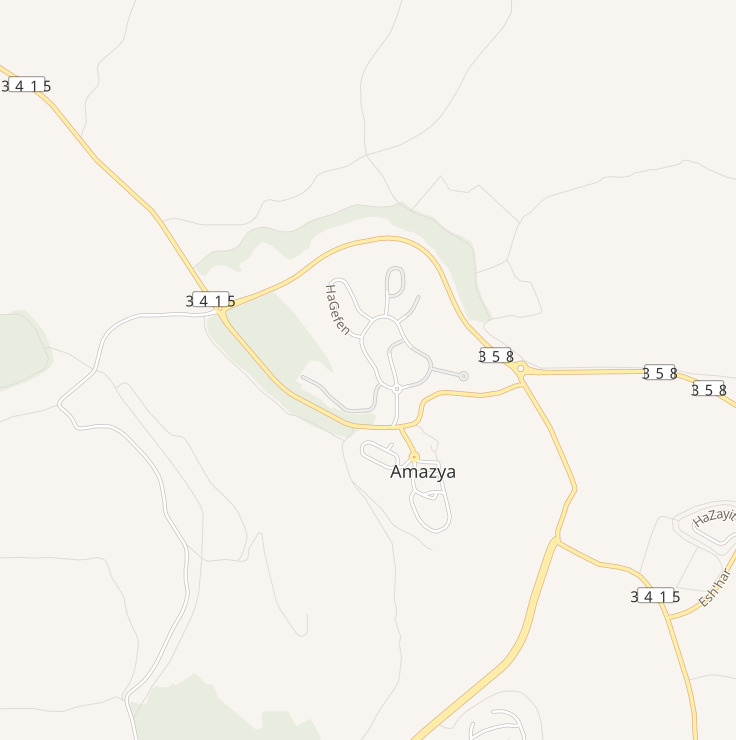
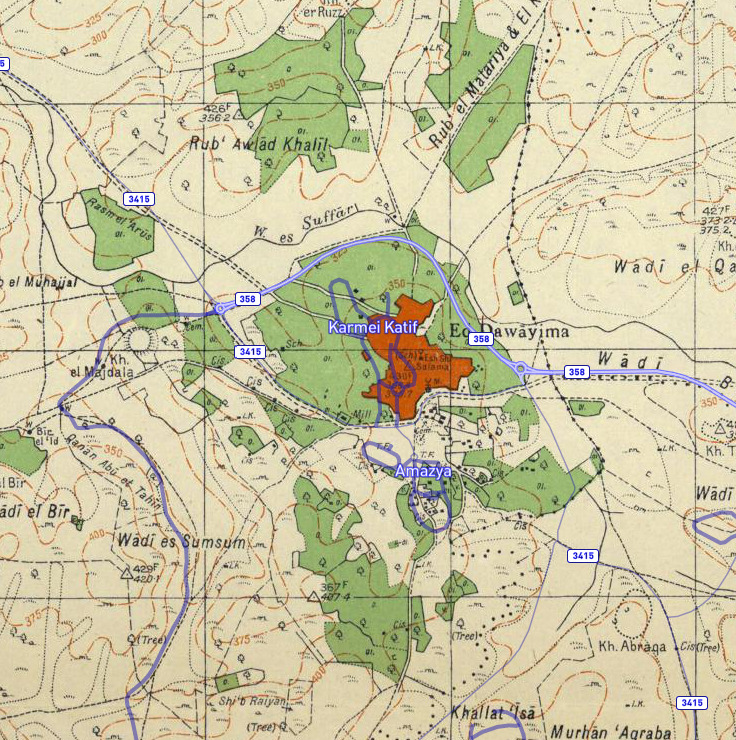
- 1870s map 1940s map modern map 1940s with modern overlay map A series of historical maps of the area around Al-Dawayima (click the buttons)

- Location within Mandatory Palestine
- Coordinates: 31°32′10″N 34°54′43″E
- Palestine grid: 141/104
- Geopolitical entity: Mandatory Palestine
- Subdistrict: Hebron
- Date of depopulation: 29 October 1948

Area
  - Total: 60.585 km^{2} (23.392 sq mi)

Population (1945)
  - Total: 3,710
- Cause(s) of depopulation: Military assault by Yishuv forces
- Current localities: Karmei Katif; Amatzia

Al-Dawayima, Dawaymeh or Dawayma (Arabic: الدوايمة) was a Palestinian town, located in the former Hebron Subdistrict of Mandatory Palestine, and in what is now the Lakhish region, some 15 kilometres south-east of Kiryat Gat.

According to a 1945 census, the town's population was 3,710, and the village lands comprised a total land area of 60,585 dunums of which nearly half was cultivable. The population figures for this town also included the populations of nearby khirbets, or ancient villages. During the 1948 Palestine war, the al-Dawayima massacre occurred. According to Saleh Abd al-Jawad an estimated 80-200 civilian men, women and children were killed. According to John Bagot Glubb, a UN report said that 30 women and children were killed.

In 1955, the ruins of the town were replaced by the Israeli moshav of Amatzia.

== History ==
It has been occasionally identified with the Old Testament town of Bosqat, the home of Josiah's mother Jedidah (2 Kings, 22:1) though the association has not found widespread acceptance.

Al-Dawayima's historical remains encompass a long period from the Bronze Age, through to the Persian and Hellenistic, down to the Ottoman period. Bulldozing what remains of the Palestinian village to prepare a new Israeli village has revealed an ancient olive press, a columbarium cave, a villa from the Second Temple era, and both mikvehs (Jewish ritual baths) and cisterns. Among the finds was an underground hiding complex used during the Bar Kokhba Revolt, where archaeologists discovered graffiti including a Hebrew abecedarium (an alphabet sequence). Given its location deep within the subterranean system, the inscription may have served not merely as a writing exercise but as an apotropaic (protective) magical device, offering a possible glimpse into Jewish magical practices of the period.

The "core clan" of Al-Dawayima were the Ahdibs, who traced their origin to the Muslim conquest and settlement of Palestine in the seventh century.

=== Ottoman era ===
In the late Ottoman era, in May, 1838, Edward Robinson visited during harvesting time. He noted that Al-Dawayima was situated on a hill, with a view of several villages to the east. During the harvest, several Christians from Beit Jala were employed here as labourers; the barley harvest was coming to an end, while the wheat harvest was just beginning. He further noted it as a Muslim village, between the mountains and Gaza, but subject to the government of el-Khulil.

In the mid-19th century, al-Dawāymeh’s residents cultivated formerly abandoned lands, which were reclassified as privately held under Ottoman land reform. This process formed part of a broader pattern of rural resettlement and expansion across the western fringes of Jabal al-Khalīl.

In 1863 Victor Guérin visited twice, and he estimated that the village contained 900 inhabitants, while an Ottoman village list from about 1870 found that Dawaime had only a population of 85, in a total of 34 houses, though the population count included men, only. It also noted that it was located west of Hebron.

In 1883, the PEF's Survey of Western Palestine described al-Dawayima as a village on a high stony ridge that had olive groves beneath it. On a higher ridge to the west stood a shrine that was topped by a white stone.

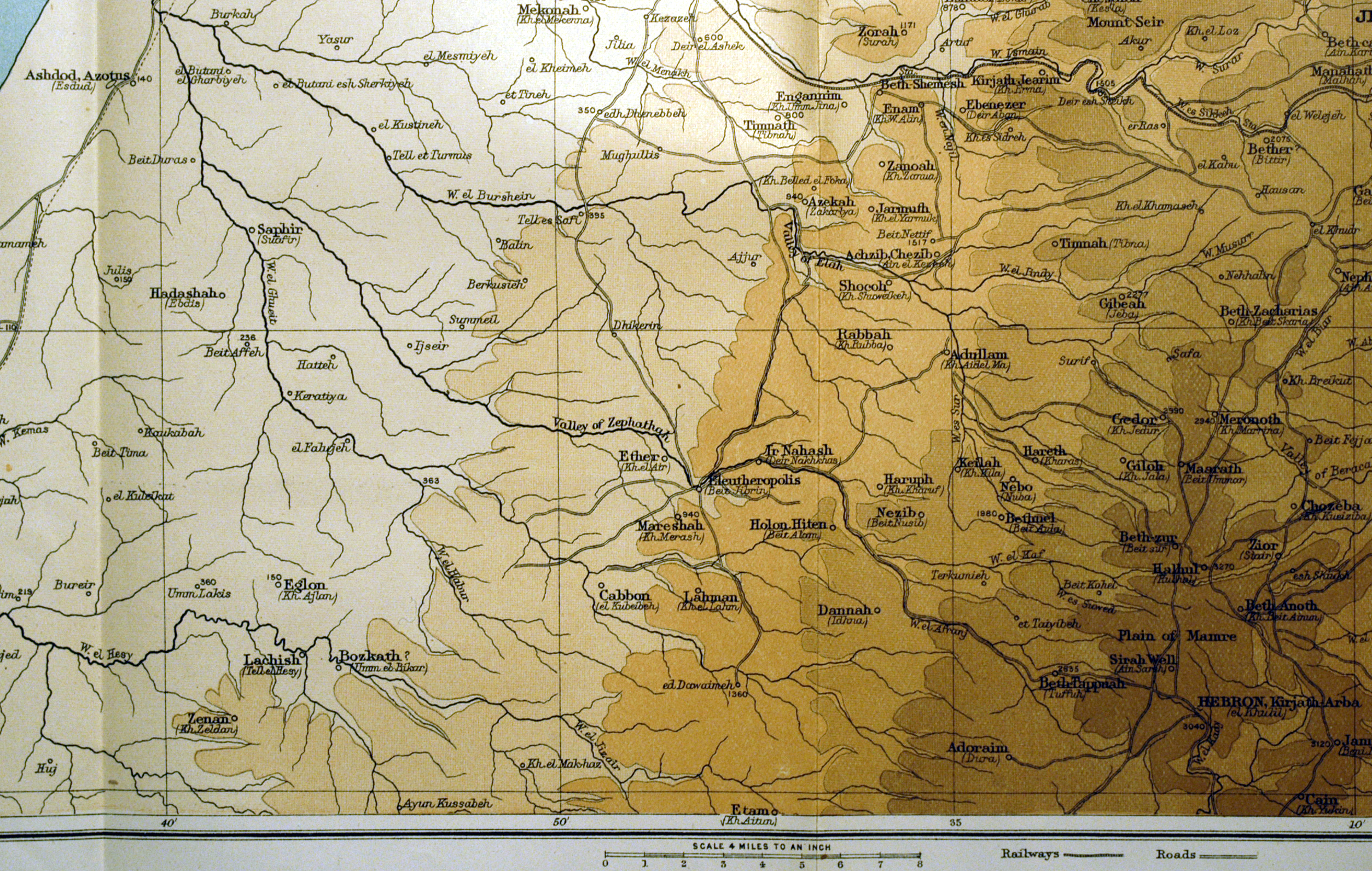
Map with Al-Dawayima dated 1894. bottom centre

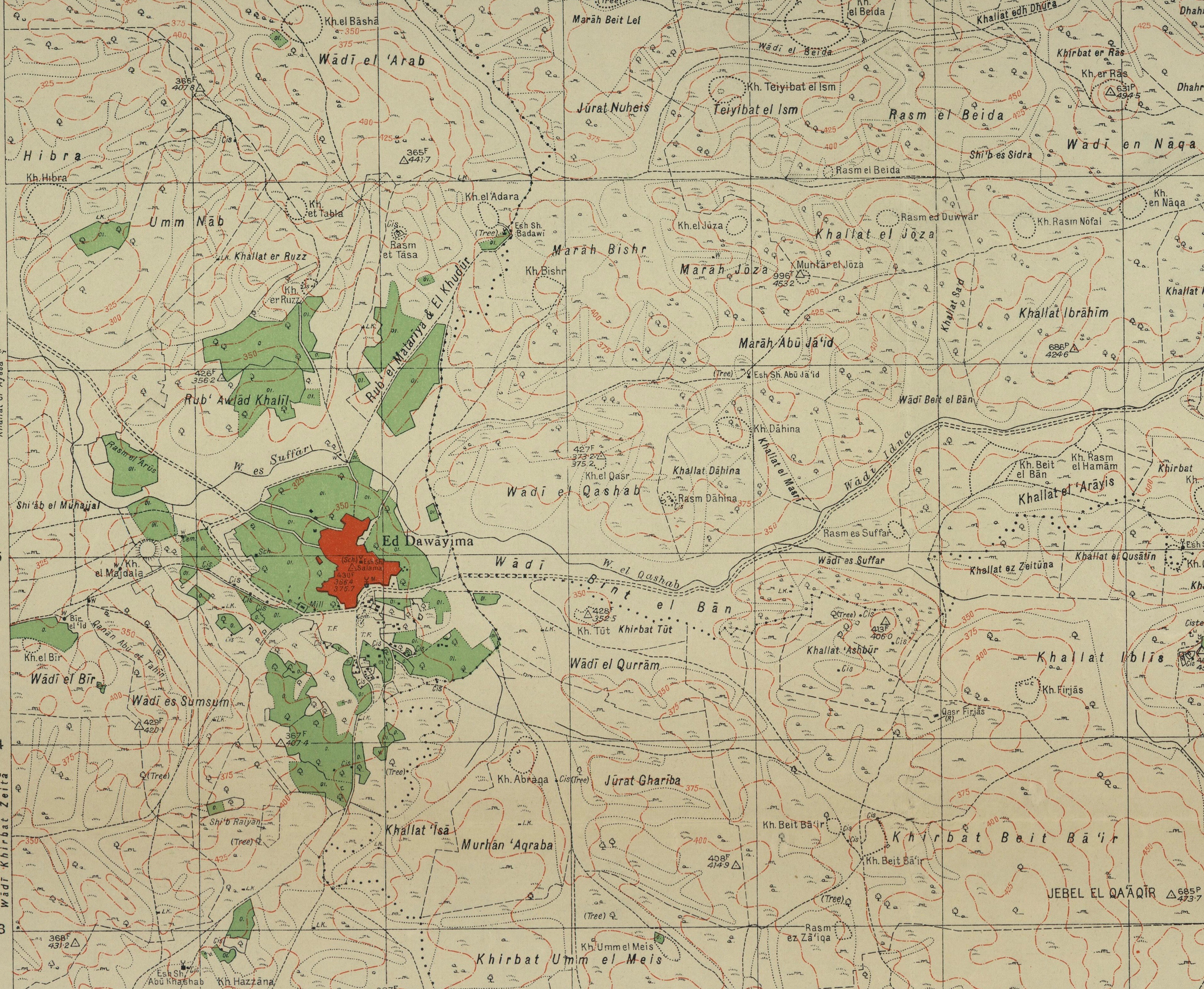
Al-Dawayima 1933 1:20,000

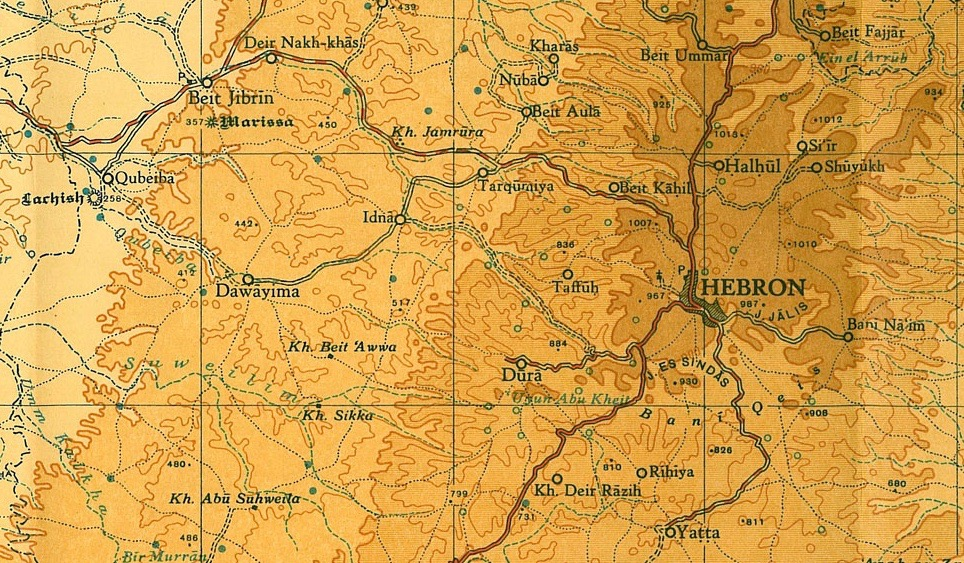
Al-Dawayima 1945 1:250,000

The people of al-Dawayima were Muslims. They maintained several religious shrines, chief among them the shrine of Shaykh ´Ali. This shrine had a large courtyard, a number of rooms, and one large hall for prayers, and was surrounded by fig and carob trees and cactuses. It attracted visitors from the neighboring villages. A mosque was located in the village center, it was maintained by the followers of al-tariqa al-khalwatiyya, a Sufi mystic order founded by Shaykh Umar al-Khalwati (d.1397)

=== British Mandate era ===
In the 1922 census of Palestine conducted by the British Mandate authorities, AI Dawaima had a population of 2,441 inhabitants, all Muslims, increasing in the 1931 census to 2,688, still all Muslim, in a total of 559 houses.

The villagers expanded and renovated the village mosque in the 1930s, and added a tall minaret.

In the 1945 statistics, Al-Dawayima had a population of 3,710 Muslims, with a total land area of 60.585 dunums of land. By 1944/45, 21,191 dunums of village land were allotted to cereals, 1,206 dunums were irrigated or used for orchards, while 179 dunams were built-up (urban) areas.

The Institute for Palestine Studies and The Palestinian Museum note the following about the town's built environment:

"Shops were scattered throughout the various neighborhoods of the village center. Houses were made of stone and mud, separated by narrow streets and alleys. The older houses were clustered closely together. Each set of houses shared a hawsh, a large courtyard that provided space for women to do their domestic chores, for children to play, and for families to gather in the evening and on special occasions. As the village expanded people began to build new houses outside of the village core. These new houses were larger and built of whitewashed stone some of them had thick, stone walls and were called jidaris (from the Arabic word for wall, jidar)....Each house had two levels: the upper level was occupied by the family members and the lower level by their animals. The houses of the well-to-do villagers had their own courtyards and large guest rooms, in addition to animal stables."

=== 1948 war and aftermath ===
Al-Dawaymima was captured by Israel's Eighty Ninth Battalion (commanded by Dov Chesis) of the 8th Armored Brigade led by the founder of the Palmach, Yitzhak Sadeh, after Operation Yoav on 29 October 1948, five days after the start of the truce. It was the site of the al-Dawayima massacre in which 80–200 civilians were killed, including women and children. According to Lieutenant-General John Bagot Glubb, a British officer stationed with Jordanian's Arab Legion in Bethlehem and Hebron at that time, the massacre was calculated to drive out the villagers and had been reported by UN observers to involve 30 deaths. The massacre was cited by Yigal Allon as the reason for the halting of the creeping annexation that included Bayt Jibrin, Qubeiba and Tel Maresha. It was also seen as a reprisal by the Israelis for the massacre of Jews in Kfar Etzion months before, on May 13, 1948, by Palestinian fighters and some members of the Arab Legion.

The moshav of Amatzia was established in 1955 on land that had belonged to Al-Dawayima. According to the Palestinian historian Walid Khalidi :

"The site has been fenced in. A cowshed, a chicken coop, and granaries have been built at its center (which has been leveled). The southern side of the site contains stone terraces and the remnants of a house. The eastern side is occupied by the residential area of the moshav."

In 2013, the whole area, apart from some ancient Jewish remains, was bulldozed to pave the way for the erection of a new community called Karmei Katif, which was completed in 2016 and which houses evacuees of the Gaza Strip settlements. The new name is reminiscent of Gush Katif.

== Culture ==
A woman's thob (loose fitting robe with sleeves) dated to about 1910 that was produced in Al-Dawayima is part of the Museum of International Folk Art (MOIFA) collection at Santa Fe. The dress is of hand-woven blue indigo linen. The embroidery is in predominantly red silk cross-stitch, with touches of violet, orange, yellow, white, green and black. The upper half of the qabbeh (the square chest panel) is embroidered with alternating columns of diamonds, (a pattern known as el-ferraneh), and eight-pointed stars, (called qamr ("moons")). The lower half of the qabbeh is in the qelayed ("necklaces") pattern. The side-panels of the skirt are completely covered with embroidered columns. Among the patterns used here are: nakhleh ("palm") motif, ward-wil-aleq ("rose-and-leech") and khem-el-basha ("the pashas tent"). Each column is topped with various trees. There is no embroidery on the long, pointed sleeves.

The village is often featured in the works of Palestinian artist Abdul Hay Mosallam who was expelled from it in 1948.

By 2011, two books about the village history had been published.

=== In popular culture ===
- In the 2008 film Salt of this Sea, Al-Dawayima is the village which Emad, the male protagonist, hails from. The village ruins serve as the temporary residence of the main characters, Emad and Soraya. The film is dedicated to the memory of the Al-Dawayima massacre.

== Families ==
Lafi

- Sanwar (سنور)
- Abd al-dean (عبد الدين)
- Abu Subaih (أبوصبيح)
- Abu-Farwa (ابوفروه)
- Abu-Galyeh (أبوغالية)
- Abu-Galyoun (أبو غليون)
- Abu-Halemah(أبوحليمة)
- Abu-Haltam (أبو حلتم)
- Abu-Kadra (أبو خضرة)
- Abu-Matr (أبو مطر)
- Abu-Me'alish (أبومعيلش)
- Abu-Rahma (ابورحمة)
- Abu-Rayan (أبو ريان)
- Abu-Safyeh (أبو صفية)
- Abu-Sugair (أبو صقير)
- Afaneh (عفانه)
- Al-Absi (العبسي)
- Al-Adarbeh (العداربة)
- Al-Aqtash (القطيشات)
- Al-Atrash (الأطرش)
- Al-Ayaseh (العيسه)
- Al-Hijouj (الحجوج)
- Al-Jamarah (الجمرة)
- Al-Jawawdeh (الجواودة)
- Al-Kateeb (الخطيب)
- Al-Khodour(الخضور)
- Al-Maqusi(المقوسي)
- Al-Mallad (الملاد)
- Al-Manasra (المناصرة)
- Al-Najaar (النجار)
- Al-Qaisieh (القيسيه)
- Al-Sabateen(السباتين)
- Al-Turk (الترك)
- Al-Zaatreh (الزعاترة)
- Asha (عشا)
- Basbous(بصبوص)
- Ead (عيد)
- El-Ghawanmeh (الغوانمه)
- Ganem (غانم)
- Hamdan (حمدان)
- Harb (حرب)
- Hudaib (هديب)
- Hunaif (حنيف)
- Ms'ed (مسعد)
- Nashwan (نشوان)
- Sa'adeh (سعادة)
- Shahin (شاهين)
- Sundoqa (صندوقه)
- Zebin (زبن)

== Famous residents ==
- Musa Hadeib

== See also ==
- Abdul Hay Mosallam Zarara
- Depopulated Palestinian locations in Israel
- List of villages depopulated during the Arab-Israeli conflict
- Killings and Massacres During the 1948 Israel/Palestine War
- al-Dawayima massacre
- Palestinian costumes

== Bibliography ==
- Aladjem, Emil; Gendler, Simeon (2012-11-07). "Amazya, Survey" (124). Hadashot Arkheologiyot – Excavations and Surveys in Israel.
- Aladjem, Emil; Gendler, Simeon (2012-12-23). "Amazya, Al-Dawayima" (124). Hadashot Arkheologiyot – Excavations and Surveys in Israel.
- Aladjem, Emil (2012-12-23). "Amazya South" (124). Hadashot Arkheologiyot – Excavations and Surveys in Israel.
- Barron, J.B., ed. (1923). Palestine: Report and General Abstracts of the Census of 1922. Government of Palestine.
- Benvenisti, E., ed. (2007). Israel and the Palestinian Refugees. Berlin, Heidelberg, New-York: Springer. ISBN 978-3-540-68160-1.
- Conder, C.R.; Kitchener, H.H. (1883). The Survey of Western Palestine: Memoirs of the Topography, Orography, Hydrography, and Archaeology. Vol. 3. London: Committee of the Palestine Exploration Fund.
- Davis, Rochelle (2011). Palestinian Village Histories: Geographies of the Displaced. Stanford: Stanford University Press. ISBN 978-0-8047-7313-3.
- Glassé, Cyril (1989): The Concise Encyclopedia of Islam. San Francisco: Harper & Row Cited in Khalidi.
- Glubb, J.B. (1957). A Soldier with the Arabs. London: Hodder and Stoughton.
- Government of Palestine, Department of Statistics (1945). Village Statistics, April, 1945.
- Guérin, V. (1869). Description Géographique Historique et Archéologique de la Palestine (in French). Vol. 1: Judee, pt. 2. Paris: L'Imprimerie Nationale.
- Hadawi, S. (1970). Village Statistics of 1945: A Classification of Land and Area ownership in Palestine. Palestine Liberation Organization Research Center. Archived from the original on 2018-12-08.
- Hartmann, M. (1883). "Die Ortschaftenliste des Liwa Jerusalem in dem türkischen Staatskalender für Syrien auf das Jahr 1288 der Flucht (1871)". Zeitschrift des Deutschen Palästina-Vereins. 6: 102–149.
- Hudayb, Musa (1985): Qaryat al-Dawayima (The village of al-Dawayima). Amman: Dar al-jalil li al-nashr. Cited in Khalidi.
- Khalidi, W. (1992). All That Remains: The Palestinian Villages Occupied and Depopulated by Israel in 1948. Washington D.C.: Institute for Palestine Studies. ISBN 0-88728-224-5.
- Mills, E., ed. (1932). Census of Palestine 1931. Population of Villages, Towns and Administrative Areas. Jerusalem: Government of Palestine.
- Morris, B. (2004). The Birth of the Palestinian Refugee Problem Revisited. Cambridge University Press. ISBN 978-0-521-00967-6.
- Morris, B. (2008). 1948: A History of the First Arab-Israeli War. Yale University Press. ISBN 978-1-902210-67-4.
- Nahshoni, Pirhiya; Lender, Yeshayahu (2010-09-07). "Amazya Forest, Survey" (122). Hadashot Arkheologiyot – Excavations and Surveys in Israel.
- Palmer, E.H. (1881). The Survey of Western Palestine: Arabic and English Name Lists Collected During the Survey by Lieutenants Conder and Kitchener, R. E. Transliterated and Explained by E.H. Palmer. Committee of the Palestine Exploration Fund.
- Robinson, E.; Smith, E. (1841). Biblical Researches in Palestine, Mount Sinai and Arabia Petraea: A Journal of Travels in the year 1838. Vol. 2. Boston: Crocker & Brewster.
- Robinson, E.; Smith, E. (1841). Biblical Researches in Palestine, Mount Sinai and Arabia Petraea: A Journal of Travels in the year 1838. Vol. 3. Boston: Crocker & Brewster.
- Seriy, Gregory (2009-08-04). "Amazya East" (121). Hadashot Arkheologiyot – Excavations and Surveys in Israel.
- Shapira, A. (2008). Yigal Allon; Native Son; A Biography. Pennsylvania: University of Pennsylvania Press. ISBN 978-0-8122-4028-3.
- Socin, A. (1879). "Alphabetisches Verzeichniss von Ortschaften des Paschalik Jerusalem". Zeitschrift des Deutschen Palästina-Vereins. 2: 135–163.
- Stillman, Yedida Kalfon (1979). Palestinian Costume and Jewelry. Albuquerque: University of New Mexico Press. ISBN 0-8263-0490-7. (A catalog of the Museum of International Folk Art (MOIFA) at Santa Fe's collection of Palestinian clothing and jewelry.)
- Varga, Daniel; Israel, Yigal (2014-05-04). "Amazya" (126). Hadashot Arkheologiyot – Excavations and Surveys in Israel.
