= Musa Hadeib =

Palestinian politician

Sheikh Musa Hadeib
- Born: Dawaymeh, near Hebron
- Died: October 1929; Jerusalem
- Occupations: Head of Mount Hebron farmers' party, Founder of Muslim National Associations
- Known for: Collaboration with Zionists, Assassination near Herod's Gate

Sheikh Musa Hadeib was the head of Mount Hebron farmers' party and a founder of the Zionist-supported Muslim National Associations. He was from the village of Dawaymeh near Hebron.

In October 1929, Musa Hadeib was killed near Herod's Gate in Jerusalem, accused of collaborating with the Zionists. His killers were never apprehended, but both his family and the Zionist Executive claimed that the followers of Amin al-Husseini, the Grand Mufti of Jerusalem and the leader of the Supreme Muslim Council, were responsible. His killers, according to Zionist intelligence, were three men dressed as women, from the Maraqa clan of Hebron.

The JTA reported the incident as having occurred on October 13, 1929 stating "Great excitement prevailed in Jerusalem today over the murder of Musa Isdeb, an Arab from a village near Hebron, who was killed at Herod’s Gate... It is presumed that the Arab is a victim of inner political enmities between Arab factions, the murdered man supposedly being active in propaganda against the Grand Mufti."

A follow-up article from October 22, 1929 called the incident a blood feud "between the family of the late Mousa Adeb, founder of the Arab peasant party and opponent of the Grand Mufti, and the clan of Amin El Husseini."

== See also ==
- Husayni-Nashashibi rivalry
- Intercommunal conflict in Mandatory Palestine#Nashashibi clan
