= Jewish-Arab Center =

Research institute at the University of Haifa

The Jewish-Arab Center (JAC) is a multidisciplinary research institute in the University of Haifa in Haifa, Israel, active since 1972 (the same year that the university began its work as an independent institution). The head of the center since 2014 is Prof. Rassem Khamaisi.

== Mission ==
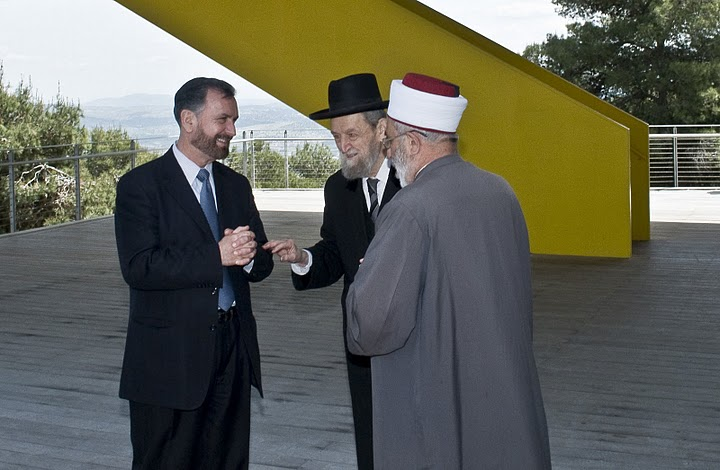
Rabbi David Rosen, Rabbi She'ar Yashuv Cohen and Sheikh Abd al Salam Menasra, at the Religion and the Jewish Arab Conflict conference.

The center's mission is to promote good relations between Jews and Arabs within Israel and to enhance peace between Israel and the Palestinians. These goals are pursued in three major interconnected spheres. First, as one of the research centers of the university the JAC coordinates between various faculties of the university – the humanities, social sciences, education, and law - interdisciplinary academic research on Jewish-Arab themes. The second sphere concerns campus life, initiating common activity, seminars and various projects between Jewish and Arab students. The third sphere is the public sphere. The JAC maintains contact with various organizations and NGO's in the field and organizes colloquiums, conferences and working groups aimed to support significant, productive discussion between Jewish and Arab politicians and representatives of the civil society in Israel and between Israelis and Palestinians.

== Activities ==
The activities conducted by the JAC focus, among other things, on peace initiatives, human and civil rights, equality of women, education, and political, social, economical, cultural and religious aspects of Israel and the Middle East at large. The JAC works toward bridging gaps and forging meaningful and lasting ties between Jews and Arabs. Community outreach plays a central role in the work of the JAC as well. The JAC is currently involved in a wide range of Jewish-Arab activities in the north part of Israel and the community at large.

During 2017, the main events conducted by JAC were:

- Conference: Outcast Voices: Reflections on the marginalized, the exiled and secondary in classical and modern Arabic culture, January 2017

The international conference was held by the department of Arabic language and literature in association with the Jewish –Arab center. It was a two days conference composed of four sessions that took place at the University of Haifa (at the Aviva and Sammy Ofer observatory) and a day trip to Nazareth. The conference included a variety of lectures that were given from various international researchers like: Alexander Key from Stanford University, Avigail Noy from Harvard University and Rachel schine from the University of Chicago. The researchers raised important issues concerning the outcast voices in the Arab community. The lectures dealt with subjects like:" Persian Outcasts? The deviation at the heart of classic Arabic", Voices in Desert? Reading the Qurʾān by Arabic Postmodernists", " Mahdist Movements of the 10th century in Baghdad". In the second day of the conference the researchers traveled to the city of Nazareth, which is full of culture and religion, they visited churches and Mosques around the city and experienced the historical wealth of the city. Towards the end of the conference and after the trip to Nazareth, the researchers returned to the university for the fourth and last session and concluding remarks.

- Conference: The Annual And Third Conference of "Arab Female Researchers Beyond The Window", March 5, 2017.

The lecturers and participators of the conference were the WO scholarship holders. The event started with an opening statement from the head of the Jewish Arab center Prof. Rassem Khamaisi followed by three sessions. The first session dealt with the female gender and experience, the lectures in this session talked about gender reading (a lecture by Dr. Hana Salman), the challenges of Arab women in the Arab community in Israel (a lecture by Dr.Rabab Sarhan) and the experience of Arab women and a reading of songs for women's Day (a lecture by Manal Badarne) . The second session dealt with female researchers, health, infrastructure and history. The scholars lectured about the campaign to raise awareness to the Brucellosis disease in the Arab community (a lecture by Dr. Samira Aobir), about the decision-making process for optimal planning of sewage systems (a lecture by Miriam Aghbariyya) and about mercenaries from the Aegean Sea in acre in the Persian period ( a lecture by Amani Abu Hamid) . The third and last session raised the subject of Education and teaching, the topics of the lectures were: I am a Literacy man: the skills required for 21st century (a lecture by Dr. Rauia Borbora) and the implementation of Visual teaching tools (a lecture by Dr. Rima Barnesi). The conference ended with a discussion alongside questions from the audience and concluding remarks. This main event was covered by the press via television and an Arab newspaper and as a result from that many scholars that took part in the conference received calls and offers to participate in interviews for different shows.

- Seminar: In Memory of Salman Natour , March 8, 2017.

"The story has not yet ended" a seminar in memory of the author Salman Natour was held at the Aviva and Sammy Ofer observatory in the askol building, university of Haifa. At the beginning of the conference opening statements and greetings were given by Prof. Rassem Khamaisi, the Head of the Jewish- Arab center, Mr. Maras Natour, Salman's family member and Ms. Arin Abdi Zo'abi Haifa City Council member and Mossawa Center. Following that were the conference's sessions, the first session discussed the literary and theatrical legacy of Salman Natour which included Dr. Masoud Hmadn, the actor Omar Hleihel, Dr. Basilios Bwowardi and Dr. Yoni Mendel. The second session was called the creator and reality and included lectures given by Prof. Reuven Snir, Dr. Rauia Borbara, Prof. Mustafa Kabha and the author Dr. Nabih Al Qasim. The third and final session dealt with the social, Journalist and political activity of Natour and began with a musical segment featuring Mr. Amin Natour followed by lectures by the author Mohammed Nafa, and Mr. Jafar Farah Director of the Mossawa center. The seminar ended with a concluding lecture from Ms. Fida Zidane.

- An Evening Dedicated to the Book Release Conditional Citizenship: On Citizenship, Equality and Offensive Legislation, March 27, 2017.

An evening for the book launch of "conditional citizenship: on citizenship, equality and offensive legislation" by Sarah Ozacky-Lazar and Yousef Jabareen. The event was held in the Rabin Observatory at University of Haifa and started with opening statements from Prof. Rassem Khamaisi, Head of the Jewish- Arab center & Prof. Gad Barzilai from the Faculty of Law and the Rector office at University of Haifa. The two talked about the importance of the book in our society and education as it touches on influential issues that deal with the minority citizenship in the state. The evening continued with a roundtable of discussions and lectures, Yousef Jabareen from the Joint List, member of Knesset, talked about law, Rights and politics in the country, Dr. Tamar Hagar discussed how Arab citizens are lacking in discourse and academia. Dr. Tamar Hustovsky Brandes lectured on the relationship between loyalty and citizenship that occupies a central place in social and political discourse and Prof. Rassem Khamaisi talked about his research, which is part of the book, titled: "Between Man and Earth," that deals with the relationship between man and the land as the basis for many disputes and conflicts, being necessary resources for the existence of healthy human communities. Dr. Sarah Ozacky-Lazar guided the roundtable and responded to remarks that were said. The evening of the launch ended with questions and an extensive discussion of the issues raised in the lectures.

- Conference: The Challenges of Tomorrow in Local Arab Government, May 16, 2017.

This conference was set In order to discuss the issues and challenges that the local Arab government is now facing. The event was held by the political science school and the Jewish- Arab center at University of Haifa. The conference started with an opening lecture from Prof. Rassem Khamaisi, who spoke about the challenges of planning in a changing society. Following that, there were three sessions, which dealt with current issues and challenges that the local Arab government is confronting, issues such as: the role of the clan in a changing Arab society, mixed cities and resource allocation to the Arab community and Transparency in local authorities. The conference Participants included public figures and prominent academics from the Arab community: Mr. Yosef Abu Geffer, Treasurer of the Hura Council; Dr. Khaled Abu Asbah; Mr.Mahim Shibli, Head of the Umm el-Ghanem council; Mr. Adham Jamal, Deputy Mayor of Acre; and Ahmed Balaha, Member of the Tel Aviv-Jaffa Council. The event ended with a light tune stand-up comedy performance from Mohammed Naama.

- Research Workshop: Honor Killings, May 25, 2017.

Over 100 women in Israel were murdered by their relatives since 2011. This research workshop organized by the Israel Democracy Institute, Ebert Foundation, and the Jewish-Arab Center was conducted in order to address this issue from a legal point of view and promote a new book release on the matter, the "Kermnitzer Book". The event was held on the 25 of May 2017 at the Aviva and Sammy Ofer Observatory located in University of Haifa. In this workshop, there was a presentation of opinions regarding the stated issue of honor killings and a dissociation about how the law deals with it.

The main participants in the event were: Prof. Oren Gazel Eyal, Prof. Rassem Khamaisi, Dr. Tehilla Altshuler, Mr. Werner Puchara, Prof. Miri Gur-Arye, Prof. Michael Karayanni, Prof. Mordechai Kremnitzer and Dr. Khaled Ghanim.

- Conference: From damage to fusion: Restorative justice and Restorative discourse in Israel, July 24, 2017

The evening opened with the words of prof. Rassem Khamaisi, the Head of the Jewish-Arab center, who talked about the connection between restorative justice and the Koran. The incoming President of the Haifa District Court, the Honorable Judge Dr. Ron Shapiro gave a guest lecture. He described how the criminal legal system generally focuses on one tool almost exclusively: punishment in response to social crime. The severity of the punishment reflects how severely society views the act committed by the accused. There are hardly any references in the criminal procedure relating to the victim or his needs, which are often only an apology or responsibility rather than punishment. Restorative justice, which was designed to address these and other needs of victims of crime, while providing an opportunity to criminals to repair their ways, is receiving an ambivalent attitude from the courts in Israel. Some take the restorative justice process very lightly in consideration before sentencing; others see it as an indication of the rehabilitation of the defendant or the willingness of the victim to forgive. Dr. Shapira gave several examples of judgments given in references to restorative justice processes. In the conclusion, Dr. Shapiro emphasized the importance of referring to the restorative justice as a treatment tool and the need to add treatment tools to the law, like the restorative justice to the courts responds basket.

== JAC on campus ==
The Jewish-Arab Center conducts various campus activities, such as:

- Student Jewish-Arab Workshop: Multiculturalism, Conflict and Partnership.
- Community Leadership
- Together for the rehabilitation of the Carmel Forest
- Breaking the Ice 2011
- The Haifa Interfaith Forum

== Scholarships and prizes ==
The Werner Otto Scholarships are awarded annually by the Association of German Friends of the University of Haifa to outstanding female Arab students engaged in graduate studies, as part of the effort to empower women. The Otto Werner Scholarships were awarded for the first time in 2001. Since then, more than 100 women have received the scholarships. The recipients are outstanding students who are also dedicated to social and educational activities in their communities, and act as advocates for many important issues and as role models for other women. Starting this year, JAC have an alumni network working on community projects, which JAC believe will bear fruit in the coming years.

JAC's alumni have continued on to PhDs, post-doctoral fellowships and academic careers; have risen to managerial positions in the public sector; and have attained professional success in the private sector. More and more women are applying for the scholarships; their fields of study are varied and not necessarily what some might consider traditionally feminine; and many more Arab women are not content to complete MA degrees, but also continue on to PhD studies.

== Research ==
The current 2017 research projects at the JAC are:

- The Growth of the Middle Classes and its impact on the Management of Arab Local Authorities (Prof. Rassem Khamaisi)

Local government is an important focus subject for research being that it is a part of the governance and management system of local citizens' lives. The central government's avoidance from supplying a basket of services and infrastructure to the citizen, and their transfer to the responsibility and authority of the local government, led to the strengthening of local and municipal citizenship. In addition, it caused the political and administrative leadership to become a central component in the level of development of a locality and the supply of quality services to citizens.

This study is intended to deal for the first time, with the process of change in the Arab communities a process of middle class growth that constitutes more than a third of the population of the localities. In this study, prof. Khamaisi will examine how the middle class influences the characterization of candidates for leadership and leaders in local authorities and will try to draw guidelines in order to cope with the Arabs new reality of growing middle class in the localities.

- Obtaining planning space Justice through implementation of a Reparcelation (unification and distribution) mechanism in the Arab localities (Prof. Rassem Khamaisi)

The study exposes the nature of the relationship between real estate policy versus planning policy and taxation policy in the reality of the transition from agrarian to urban society, and the transition from a normative approach to the land to economic relations as a result of the granting of planning rights that enable direct development. The study includes a discussion on the form of democratization in the planning process, which is the result of decentralizing the planning system with the implementation of the reform in the planning system. At the same time, the research will have an applied contribution that will be presented by guidelines and a toolbox detailing how to implement the mechanism of consolidation and division, in order to correct distortions between private owners and between private landowners and the state.

- Water Authority Research (Prof. Rassem Khamaisi)

The domestic and urban water and sewage sector consumes more than 40% of the country's freshwater consumption, and is a central component in the management of the national water economy. The ongoing urbanization process and the constant increase in the standard of living, which increase demand for water, reinforce the importance of optimal, efficient, reliable and policy-oriented management that will ensure regular, reliable and quality water and sanitation supplies while achieving public benefits.

The goals of the study are to examine the performance measures that were required from the corporations with their establishment and over the years, and to formulate performance indicators that will better serve both the corporations and the regulator, by studying the global experience on the subject and the needs of both sides.

== Publications ==
The center's publication during 2015-2017

- Study Report: Testing government policy towards the Arab community and the work of Arab local authorities

Final report that maps the main barriers which stand before a social- economic development of Arab authorities. The research team included: Prof. Itai Send, Issachar Rosen-Zvi, Prof. Rassem Khamaisi, CPA. Ziad Abu Hableh.

- Branding Acre as a shared space

The document presents a strategic marketing plan for the city of Acre as a shared space between Arabs and Jews, and as an extension to the existing branding plan of Acre as a hub of Mediterranean cultures. Acre's past and present as a shared space among different cultures and religions are a major opportunity for boosting the city's image. The document was edited by Prof. Eli Abraham and Dr. Eran Ketter.

- Al- Karmil

The book includes articles from the Arabic literature which interpret the reality of life for Arabs and tests them through literary works. This collection of articles deals with the concept of "Dreams" and how it's presented in the Arabic literature. This 36 book volume was edited by Ibrahim Taha.

- Still Playing by the Rules

Index of Arab –Jewish relations in Israel 2013 by Sammy Smooha. The findings of the research indicate the attitudes of the Arab and Jewish public towards each other. The index is part of a wide project that includes two surveys that are conducted every year since 2003. One survey is based on 700 face to face interviews with Arab elderlies (including Druze and Bedouin) and a survey that is based on 700 telephone interviews with Jewish elderlies (including immigrants, kibbutz members, and settlers). This index it's the only scientific tool in Israel which examines every year in the same method the attitudes of Jewish and Arab towards each other and towards the country and tests change trends over time.

- Between social and real estate values: the housing market among Arab citizens in Israel

A research by Prof. Rassem Khamaisi, head of the Jewish-Arab Center and a researcher in the department of geography and environmental studies . The residential housing issue is uppermost on the Arab community's agenda. This research examined current changes and trends occurring in the housing market among the Arab community.

- Violence and Crime in the Arab community in Israel

A book by Dr. Nohad Ali that deals with the phenomenon of violence in the Arab community and how it's perceived by the Arab and Jewish public. In addition, the book includes mapping, analyzing and discussion of solution to this problem of violence.

- Conditional citizenship: on citizenship, equality and offensive legislation

A Collection of papers from different researchers that deals with Legal, social, educational and comparative aspects. The book presents the process and trends that occur in our reality. From the end of 2012 throughout 2013 the Van Leer Jerusalem Institute with Dirasat Arab Center for Law and Policy and the Jewish-Arab center held discussion with a group of researchers that conducted interdisciplinary researches. The activity of the group included conferences and public event all over the country. The studies of the group member are all gathered in this book. The book itself was edited by: Sarah Ozacky-Lazar and Yousef Jabareen.

- Public Space and Landscape in Arab localities in Israel: Eliminating Barriers and Undertaking Development Challenges

A study by Prof. Rassem Khamaisi head of the Jewish-Arab center and a researcher in the department of geography and environmental studies .The book deals with public spaces and appearances of Arab localities in Israel, in a time when Arab localities are undergoing urbanization. The book, in addition, maps out the barriers and challenges that the localities face in order to develop public spaces and improve their appearances.

- The Arabs in the mixed towns in Israel comparative political analysis

Salim Brake's book on the Arab politics in mixed cities in Israel. The study addresses the question whether representatives are always committed to their constituents and are freely elected by them. This issue of representation is extensive, encompassing various aspects of citizens' lives. At the decision –making level, in public administration, identity, cultural, economic aspects and more. The research addresses concisely samples of issues and points out the need for future comprehensive study on mixed cities.

- The Palestinians in Israel: Historical, Sociological and Political Research

Mursi Abu Mouk's book on the history, sociology, and politics of the Palestinian population in Israel. The book presents points in the Palestinian past that explain the situation of this population and describes the formative events that have created and established its status till this day.

- Environmental demographic and economic factors that influence the real estate rates in Acre

The housing and real estate issue is at the heart of every public, social and economic discussion around the country. The stiff prices of housing are the result of the existing-limited supply that straggles to meet the growing and suitable demand pressures in popular places. This difficulty also applies in mixed cities, including Acre and her surroundings. This book by Nasser Khair and Prof. Boris A. Portnov deals with the environmental, demographic and economic factors that influence the real estate rates in Acre.

- Living together in a diverse campus

This paper summarizes the research that was carried out over the past three years in the university campus. The study was initiated by the Jewish-Arab Center and focused on the question of whether or not an academic institute has the ability to adapt itself to students from diverse groups, and specifically to students from the Arab society, which constitutes a relatively large minority on campus and in Israel. The study analyzed the academic campus in the context of inequality and conflict between national / ethnic communities and examined how the two communities, Jewish and Arab, occupy the campus, a space they are forced or choose to share.

- Two banks to the wadi

The book of Riad Kabha, born in 1953, is a resident of Barta'a, a graduate of Tel Aviv University, teacher and educator, Mukhtar, head of the Sama Council (2005-2009) and director of the Jewish-Arab Center for Peace in Givat Haviva. Through this book Kabha tells the story of his life in the village of Barta'a, a village divided between Israel and the Palestinian Authority. The book provides a glimpse of the people that live between two identities, a Palestinian one and an Israeli one, and face daily conflicts with many contradictions.

- The Spatial-Functional Dimension of Jewish-Arab Relations: from Mixed Cities to Mixed Regions

A study by Prof. Rassem Khamaisi from the Department of Geography and Environmental Studies at the University of Haifa and Prof. Yitzhak Omer from the Department of Geography and Human Environment at Tel Aviv University. This study exposes the types of functional relations between a minority and a majority in the central metropolitan area in Israel and examines the level of tolerance of the communities and the spatial cooperation.

== The Druze section ==
In the early 1970s, the Druze section, including the Druze Archive, was integrated into the JAC. The Druze section is headed by Prof. Kais Firro of the department of Middle East History.

A major task of the Druze section is to study, preserve and present Druze history, tradition and culture. Since its establishment, the archive has become an international source of information on Druze culture and tradition. It contains one of the finest collections of its kind in the Middle East, including books, periodicals and chronicles acquired from archives all over the world. Another key goal is education for the Druze and the advancement of young leadership. Meetings are organized between the Druze public and academic and military figures, in order to engender ideas for shared projects and to resolve conflicts and problems. In 2005, several meetings of Druze ex-army officers were held, in which critical issues among the Druze population were discussed, and solutions such as taking responsibility and creating a climate for change within the public and in the government's attitude were offered. One decision was to establish a task force from different sectors that would focus on specific issues.

== Staff ==
The Head of the JAC is Professor Rassem Khamaisi. Prof. Khamaisi is professor at the University of Haifa's Department of Geography and Environmental Studies.

=== Former heads ===
The following have headed the centre:

- Prof. Itzchak Weismann, 2011–2014
- Prof. Shulamit Almog, 2009–2010
- Prof. Faisal Azaiza, 2002–2009
- Prof. Amatzia Baram, 1999–2002
- Dr Ibrahim Geries, 1996–1999
- Prof. Joseph Ginat, 1992–1996
- Prof. Stanley Waterman, 1991–1992
- Prof. George J. Kanaze, 1986–1991
- Prof. Arnon Soffer, 1984–1986
- Prof. Avner Yaniv, 1983–1984
- Prof. Arnon Soffer, 1982–1983
- Prof. Avner Yaniv, 1980–1982
- Prof. David Kushner, 1977–1980
- Prof. Gabriel Ben-Dor, 1974–1977
- Dr Avraham Binyamin, 1972–1974
