= Romance (prose fiction) =

Genre of novel

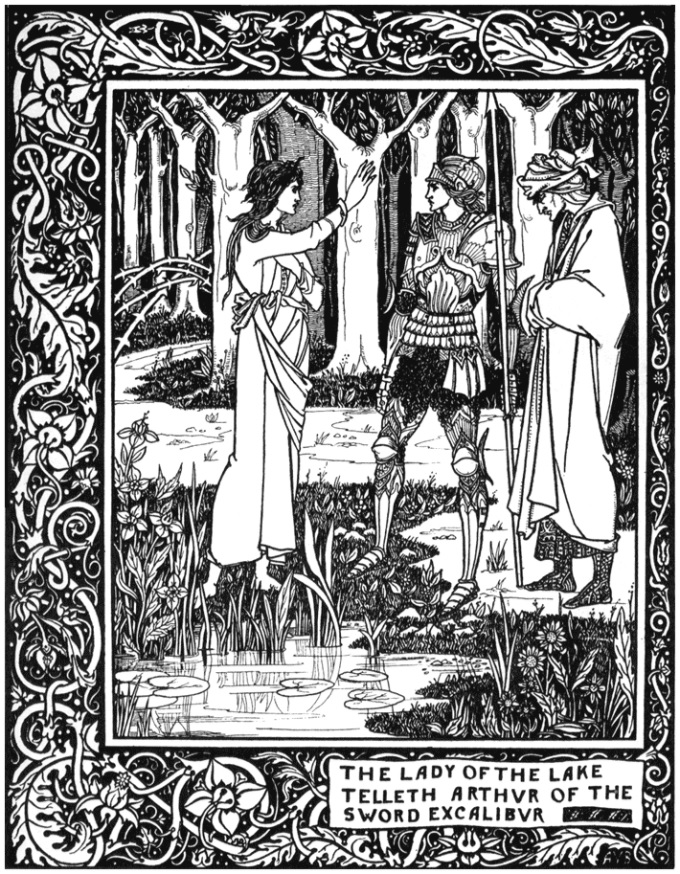
"How Arthur by the mean of Merlin gat Excalibur his sword of the Lady of the Lake", illustration for Le Morte Darthur, J. M. Dent & Co., London (1893–1894), by Aubrey Beardsley

Romance is "a fictitious narrative in prose or verse; the interest of which turns upon marvellous and uncommon incidents", a narrative method that was contrasted to the new, main tradition of the 18th and 19th centuries: the novel, which realistically depicts life. Walter Scott described romance as a "kindred term" to novel, and many European languages do not distinguish between them (e.g., "le roman, der Roman, il romanzo" in French, German, and Italian, respectively).

There is a second type of romance: love romances in genre fiction, where the primary focus is on love and marriage. The term "romance" is now mainly used to refer to this type, and for other fiction it is "now chiefly archaic and historical" (OED). Works of fiction such as Wuthering Heights and Jane Eyre combine elements from both types.

Although early stories of historical romance often took the form of the romance, the terms "romance novel" and "historical romance" are confusing, because the words "romance" and "romantic" have held multiple meanings historically: referring to either romantic love or "the character or quality that makes something appeal strongly to the imagination, and sets it apart from [...] everyday life"; this latter sense is associated with "adventure, heroism, chivalry, etc." (OED), and connects the romance form with the Romantic movement, and the gothic novel, as well as the medieval romance tradition, though the genre has a long history that includes the ancient Greek novel.

In addition to Walter Scott other romance writers (as defined by Scott) include the Brontës, E. T. A. Hoffmann, Victor Hugo, Nathaniel Hawthorne, Robert Louis Stevenson, and Thomas Hardy. Later examples are, Joseph Conrad, John Cowper Powys, J. R. R. Tolkien and A. S. Byatt.

== Definition ==
The American novelist Nathaniel Hawthorne described a romance as being radically different from a novel by not being concerned with the possible or probable course of ordinary experience.

The term romance is applied across a number of genres, including the love romance novel, the historical novel, the adventure novel, and scientific romance (an older term for what is now called science fiction). Works of nautical fiction can also be romances, as the genre often overlaps with historical romance, adventure fiction, and fantasy stories. The more modern term historical fantasy covers one sort of "romance".

The following are the two main definitions relating to literature found in the Oxford English Dictionary:

- A fictitious narrative, usually in prose, in which the settings or the events depicted are remote from everyday life, or in which sensational or exciting events or adventures form the central theme; a book, etc., containing such a narrative. Now chiefly archaic and historical;
- A story of romantic love, esp. one which deals with love in a sentimental or idealized way; a book, film, etc., with a narrative or story of this kind. Also as mass noun: literature of this kind.

Overlap is also sometimes found between the above terms, when literary romance also contains a strong love interest. Examples include Wuthering Heights and Jane Eyre.

And in other words:

With the rise of realism in the novel, the romance began to be considered a less serious and more frivolous genre, so that in the 20th century the term 'romantic novel' is often used disparagingly, to imply a contrast with a realist novel ... The term gradually came to mean any fiction remote from the conditions and concerns of everyday life. In this sense, romance is a broad term which can include or overlap with such genres as the historical novel or fantasy. In popular culture, however, a romance has come to mean specifically a love story, in which a happy ending follows a series of vicissitudes.

As noted above a relationship exists between romance and "fantasy", something which arises in particular because of the relationship between this type of novel and medieval chivalric romances.

The most common fantasy world is one based on medieval Europe, and has been since William Morris used it in his early fantasy works, such as The Well at the World's End. and particularly since the 1954 publication of J.R.R. Tolkien's The Lord of the Rings. Such a world is often called "pseudo-medieval"—particularly when the writer has snatched up random elements from the era, which covered a thousand years and a continent, and thrown them together without consideration for their compatibility, or even introduced ideas not so much based on the medieval era as on romanticized views of it. When these worlds are copied not so much from history as from other fantasy works, there is a heavy tendency to uniformity and lack of realism. The full width and breadth of the medieval era is seldom drawn upon. Governments, for instance, tend to be uncompromisingly feudal-based, or evil empires or oligarchies, usually corrupt, while there was far more variety of rule in the actual Middle Ages. Fantasy worlds also tend to be economically medieval, and disproportionately pastoral.

== Origins ==
=== Early romance ===
The Epic of Gilgamesh may be considered a romance by some definitions. Gardner and Maier define Sîn-lēqi-unninni's version (13th–10th centuries) as a romance, centered around a heroic quest (perilous journey, preliminary minor battles, a crucial conflict, a tragic turn, then the exaltation of the hero).

=== Medieval romance ===
As a literary genre of high culture, "heroic romance" or "chivalric romance" is a type of prose and verse narrative that was popular in the noble courts of High Medieval and Early Modern Europe. They were fantastic stories about marvel-filled adventures, often of a chivalric knight-errant portrayed as having heroic qualities, who goes on a quest. The word medieval also evokes distressed damsels, dragons, and other romantic tropes. It developed further from the epics as time went on; in particular, "the emphasis on love and courtly manners distinguishes it from the chanson de geste and other kinds of epic, in which masculine military heroism predominates."

=== Later influence ===
Edward Dowden argued that Shakespeare's late comedies should be called "romances", because they resemble late medieval and early modern "chivalric romance".

The rise of the modern novel as an alternative to the chivalric romance began with Miguel de Cervantes, and, especially with, Don Quixote (1605, 1615). Initially seen as a comedy satirizing chivalry, in the 19th century it was seen as a social commentary, but no one could easily tell "whose side Cervantes was on". Many critics came to view the work as a tragedy in which Don Quixote's idealism and nobility are viewed by the post-chivalric world as insane, and are defeated and rendered useless by common reality.

While the modern literary fiction romance was influenced by medieval romance via the Gothic novel, and the interest of Romantic writers in the medieval period, William Morris and J. R. R. Tolkien were directly influenced by medieval literature. In the nineteenth century William Morris wrote a series of imaginative fictions usually referred to as the "prose romances", which were attempts to revive the genre of medieval romance, and written in imitation of medieval prose. These novels – including The Wood Beyond the World and The Well at the World's End – have been credited as important milestones in the history of fantasy fiction, because, while other writers wrote of foreign lands, or of dream worlds, or the future (as Morris did in News from Nowhere), Morris's works were the first to be set in an entirely invented fantasy world. On its publication, The Well at the World's End was praised by H. G. Wells, who compared the book to Malory and admired its writing style.

J. R. R. Tolkien objected to The Lord of the Rings being called a novel, as he viewed it as a heroic romance. Literary critics also apply the term high fantasy to The Lord of the Rings.

While fantasy is, generally speaking, not significant in the works of romance writers, Walter Scott's definition includes "marvellous and uncommon incidents". Hawthorne, as noted above, also described romance as "not being concerned with the possible or probable course of ordinary experience".

=== Gothic novel ===
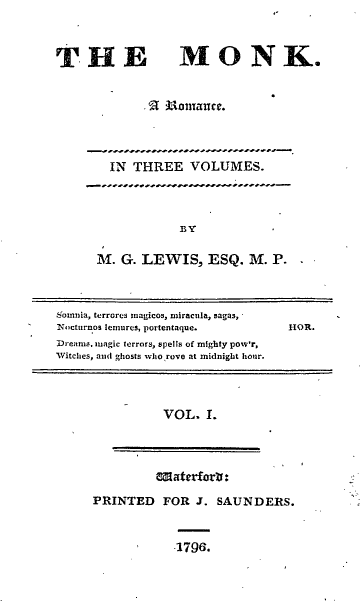
Matthew Lewis, The Monk (1795)

From 1764, with the Horace Walpole's gothic novel The Castle of Otranto, the romance genre experienced a revival. Other important works are Ann Radcliffe's The Mysteries of Udolpho (1794) and 'Monk' Lewis's The Monk (1795).

In the preface of the second edition, Walpole claims The Castle of Otranto is "an attempt to blend the two kinds of romance, the ancient and the modern." He defines the "ancient" romance as being defined by its fantastic nature ("its imagination and improbability") while defining the "modern" romance as being more deeply rooted in literary realism ("a strict adherence to common life," in his words). By combining fantastic situations (helmets falling from the sky, walking portraits, etc.) with supposedly real people acting in a "natural" manner, Walpole created a new and distinct style of literary fiction, which has frequently been cited as a template for all subsequent gothic novels. The Monthly Review stated that for "[t]hose who can digest the absurdities of Gothic fiction" Otranto offered "considerable entertainment".

The Castle of Otranto is widely regarded as the first Gothic novel, and, with its knights, villains, wronged maidens, haunted corridors and things that go bump in the night, is the spiritual godfather of Frankenstein and Dracula, the creaking floorboards of Edgar Allan Poe and the shifting stairs and walking portraits of Harry Potter’s Hogwarts.

— "Strawberry Hill, Horace Walpole's fantasy castle, to open its doors again", The Guardian.

Charles Dickens was influenced by gothic fiction and incorporated gothic imagery, settings and plot devices in his works. Victorian gothic moved from castles and abbeys into contemporary urban environments: in particular London, in Oliver Twist, and Bleak House. Great Expectations contains elements of the Gothic genre, especially Miss Havisham, the bride frozen in time, and the ruined Satis House filled with weeds and spiders. Other characters linked to this genre include the aristocratic Bentley Drummle, because of his extreme cruelty; Pip himself, who spends his youth chasing a frozen beauty; the monstrous Orlick, who systematically attempts to murder his employers. Then there is the fight to the death between Compeyson and Magwitch, and the fire that ends up killing Miss Havisham, scenes dominated by horror, suspense, and the sensational.

== Historical romance ==
Historical romance (also historical novel) is a broad category of fiction in which the plot takes place in a setting located in the past. Walter Scott helped popularize this genre in the early 19th century. Literary fiction historical romances continue to be published, and a notable recent example is Wolf Hall (2009), a multi-award-winning novel by English historical novelist Hilary Mantel. It is also a genre of mass-market fiction, which is related to the broader romantic love genre.

=== Walter Scott ===
Walter Scott with Waverley (1814) invented "the true historical novel". At the same time he was influenced by gothic romance, and had collaborated in 1801 with 'Monk' Lewis on Tales of Wonder. With his Waverley novels Scott "hoped to do for the Scottish border" what Goethe and other German poets "had done for the Middle Ages, "and make its past live again in modern romance". Scott's novels "are in the mode he himself defined as romance, 'the interest of which turns upon marvelous and uncommon incidents'". He used his imagination to re-evaluate history by rendering things, incidents and protagonists in the way only the novelist could do. Scott, the novelist, resorted to documentary sources as any historian would have done, but as a romantic he gave his subject a deeper imaginative and emotional significance. By combining research with "marvelous and uncommon incidents", Scott attracted a far wider market than any historian could, and was the most famous novelist of his generation, throughout Europe.

Scott influenced many nineteenth-century British novelists, including Edward Bulwer-Lytton, Charles Kingsley, and Robert Louis Stevenson, and those who wrote for children, like Charlotte Yonge and G. A. Henty.

Walter Scott had an immense impact throughout Europe. "His historical fiction ... created for the first time a sense of the past as a place where people thought, felt and dressed differently". His historical romances "influenced Balzac, Dostoevsky, Flaubert, Tolstoy, Dumas, Pushkin, and many others; and his interpretation of history was seized on by Romantic nationalists, particularly in Eastern Europe". Auguste- Jean-Baptiste Defauconpret (1767–1843) "the principal French translator of the Waverley Novels, played a pivotal role in the diffusion of Scott's work throughout Europe". "In Italy, Poland, Russia, and Spain they were widely read long before indigenous versions appeared." The reception of Sir Walter Scott in Europe, edited by Murray Pittock, has articles on Scott's influence on the novels throughout Europe, including France, Spain, Austria, Germany, Russia, Czechoslovakia, Hungary, Poland, Denmark, Norway, and Sweden. (See also, "Other authors", below).

In America he influenced Fenimore Cooper and Nathaniel Hawthorne, amongst others.

=== Relationship with Romanticism ===
Romance is closely associated with the Romantic movement. The gothic novel, and romanticism influenced the development of the modern literary romance. Hugh Walpole's gothic novels combine elements of the medieval romance, which he deemed too fanciful, and the modern novel, which he considered to be too confined to strict realism. Romanticism influenced the romance through its emphasis on emotion and individualism as well as glorification of all the past and nature, and preference for the medieval rather than the classical; its emphasis on extremes of emotion and its reaction against the perceived constraints of rationalism imposed by the Enlightenment, and associated classical aesthetic values, were also a significant influence.

Walter Scott's novels are frequently described as historical romances, and Northrop Frye suggested "the general principle that most 'historical novels' are romances". In addition to Walpole, Scott, and the Brontës other romance writers (as defined by Scott) include E. T. A. Hoffmann, Victor Hugo, Nathaniel Hawthorne, Robert Louis Stevenson, and Thomas Hardy. In the twentieth century, examples are Joseph Conrad, John Cowper Powys, and more recently, J. R. R. Tolkien and A. S. Byatt, whose best-selling novel Possession: A Romance won the Booker Prize in 1990.

== Love romance ==
The genre of works of extended prose fiction dealing with romantic love existed in classical Greece. Five ancient Greek romance novels have survived to the present day in a state of near-completion: Chareas and Callirhoe, Leucippe and Clitophon, Daphnis and Chloe, The Ephesian Tale, and The Ethiopian Tale.

Precursors of the modern popular love-romance can also be found in the sentimental novel Pamela, or Virtue Rewarded, by Samuel Richardson, published in 1740. Pamela was the first popular novel to be based on a courtship as told from the perspective of the heroine. Unlike many of the novels of the time, Pamela had a happy ending, when after Mr. B attempts unsuccessfully to seduce and rape Pamela multiple times, he eventually rewards her virtue by sincerely proposing an equitable marriage to her. Richardson began writing Pamela as a book of letter templates, in the tradition of the conduct book, that evolved into a novel.

In the early part of the Victorian era, the Brontë sisters, like Austen, wrote literary fiction that influenced later popular fiction. Charlotte Brontë's Jane Eyre incorporates elements of both the gothic novel and Elizabethan drama, and "demonstrate[s] the flexibility of the romance novel form". One 2007 British poll presented Wuthering Heights as the greatest love story of all time. However, "some of the novel's admirers consider it not a love story at all but an exploration of evil and abuse". Helen Small sees Wuthering Heights as being, both "one of the greatest love stories in the English language", while at the same time a "most brutal revenge narratives". Some critics suggest that reading Wuthering Heights as a love story not only "romanticizes abusive men and toxic relationships but goes against Brontë's clear intent". Moreover, while a "passionate, doomed, death-transcending relationship between Heathcliff and Catherine Earnshaw Linton forms the core of the novel", Wuthering Heights

consistently subverts the romantic narrative. Our first encounter with Heathcliff shows him to be a nasty bully. Later, Brontë puts in Heathcliff's mouth an explicit warning not to turn him into a Byronic hero: After ... Isabella elop[es] with him, he sneers that she did so "under a delusion ... picturing in me a hero of romance".

Emily Brontë was influenced by Walter Scott, the gothic novel, and romanticism more broadly.

Critic Christopher Lehmann-Haupt, writing about A. S. Byatt's Possession: A Romance in the New York Times, noted that what he describes as the "wonderfully extravagant novel" is "pointedly subtitled 'A Romance'." He says it is at once "a detective story" and "an adultery novel."

Many famous literary fiction romance novels, unlike most mass-market novels, end tragically, including Wuthering Heights by Emily Brontë, Anna Karenina by Leo Tolstoy, The Thorn Birds by Colleen McCullough, Norwegian Wood by Haruki Murakami, Atonement by Ian McEwan, and The Song of Achilles by Madeline Miller.

Genre fiction romance novels, first developed in the 19th century, started to become more popular after the First World War. In 1919, E.M. Hull's novel The Sheik was published in the United Kingdom. The novel, which became hugely popular, was adapted into a movie (1921).

The mass market version of the historical romance, is seen as beginning in 1921, when Georgette Heyer published The Black Moth. This is set in 1751, but many of Heyer's novels were inspired by Jane Austen's novels and are set around the time Austen lived, in the later Regency period. Because Heyer's romances are set more than 100 years earlier, she includes carefully researched historical detail to help her readers understand the period. Unlike other popular love-romance novels of the time, Heyer's novels used the setting as a major plot device. Her characters often exhibit twentieth century sensibilities, and more conventional characters in the novels point out the heroine's eccentricities, such as wanting to marry for love.

In the 1930s the British publishers Mills & Boon began releasing hardback romance novels. The books were sold through weekly two-penny libraries. In the 1950s the company began offering the books for sale through newsagents across the United Kingdom.

== Sensation novel ==
The sensation novel was a literary genre of fiction that achieved peak popularity in Great Britain in the 1860s and 1870s. Its literary forebears included the melodramatic novels and the Newgate novels, it also drew on the Gothic and romantic genres of fiction. Whereas romance and realism had traditionally been contradictory modes of literature, they were brought together in sensation fictionof the Victorian era – combining "romance and realism" in a way that "strains both modes to the limit". The loss of identity is seen in many sensation fiction stories because this was a common social anxiety.

Sensation fiction is commonly seen to have emerged as a definable genre in the wake of three novels: Wilkie Collins's The Woman in White (1859–60); Ellen (Mrs. Henry) Wood's East Lynne (1861); and Mary Elizabeth Braddon's Lady Audley's Secret (1862). Charles Dickens' Great Expectations (1861) is another example.

== Adventure fiction ==
R. L. Stevenson, Treasure island

Critic Don D'Ammassa defines the adventure fiction genre as follows:

An adventure is an event or series of events that happens outside the course of the protagonist's ordinary life, usually accompanied by danger, often by physical action. Adventure stories almost always move quickly, and the pace of the plot is at least as important as characterization, setting and other elements of a creative work.

D'Ammassa argues that adventure fiction makes the element of danger the focus; hence he argues that Charles Dickens's novel A Tale of Two Cities is an adventure novel because the protagonists are in constant danger of being imprisoned or killed, whereas Dickens's Great Expectations is not because "Pip's encounter with the convict is an adventure, but that scene is only a device to advance the main plot, which is not truly an adventure."

The standard plot of Medieval romances was a series of adventures. Following a plot framework as old as Heliodorus, and so durable as to be still alive in Hollywood movies, a hero would undergo a first set of adventures before he met his lady. A separation would follow, with a second set of adventures leading to a final reunion.

Variations kept the genre alive. From the mid-19th century onwards, when mass literacy grew, adventure became a popular subgenre of fiction. Although not exploited to its fullest, adventure has seen many changes over the years – from being constrained to stories of knights in armor to stories of high-tech espionages. Examples of that period include Sir Walter Scott, Alexandre Dumas, père, Jules Verne, Brontë Sisters, H. Rider Haggard, Victor Hugo, Emilio Salgari, Louis Henri Boussenard, Thomas Mayne Reid, Sax Rohmer, Edgar Wallace, and Robert Louis Stevenson.

Rider Haggard (1856–1925), author of King Solomon's Mines ("romantic adventure"), She: A History of Adventure, was an English writer of adventure fiction set in exotic locations, predominantly Africa, and a pioneer of the lost world literary genre. He was "part of the literary reaction against domestic realism that has been called a romance revival." Other writers following this trend were Robert Louis Stevenson, George MacDonald, and William Morris. Robert Louis Stevenson, wrote romances, including historical romances, in which adventure is often a prominent element ("adventure, heroism, chivalry", amongst other things, are associated with the word "romance" according to the OED). These include Treasure Island (1883) – an adventure novel about piracy and buried treasure; Prince Otto (1885) – an action romance set in the imaginary Germanic state; Strange Case of Dr Jekyll and Mr Hyde (1886) – A kind and intelligent physician turns into a psychopathic monster after imbibing a drug intended to separate good from evil in a personality (a gothic novel); Kidnapped (1886) – an historical novel; The Black Arrow: A Tale of the Two Roses (1888) – an historical adventure novel and romance set during the Wars of the Roses, and The Master of Ballantrae: A Winter's Tale (1889) – a tale of revenge, set in Scotland, America and India.

== Scientific romances ==
=== H. G. Wells ===
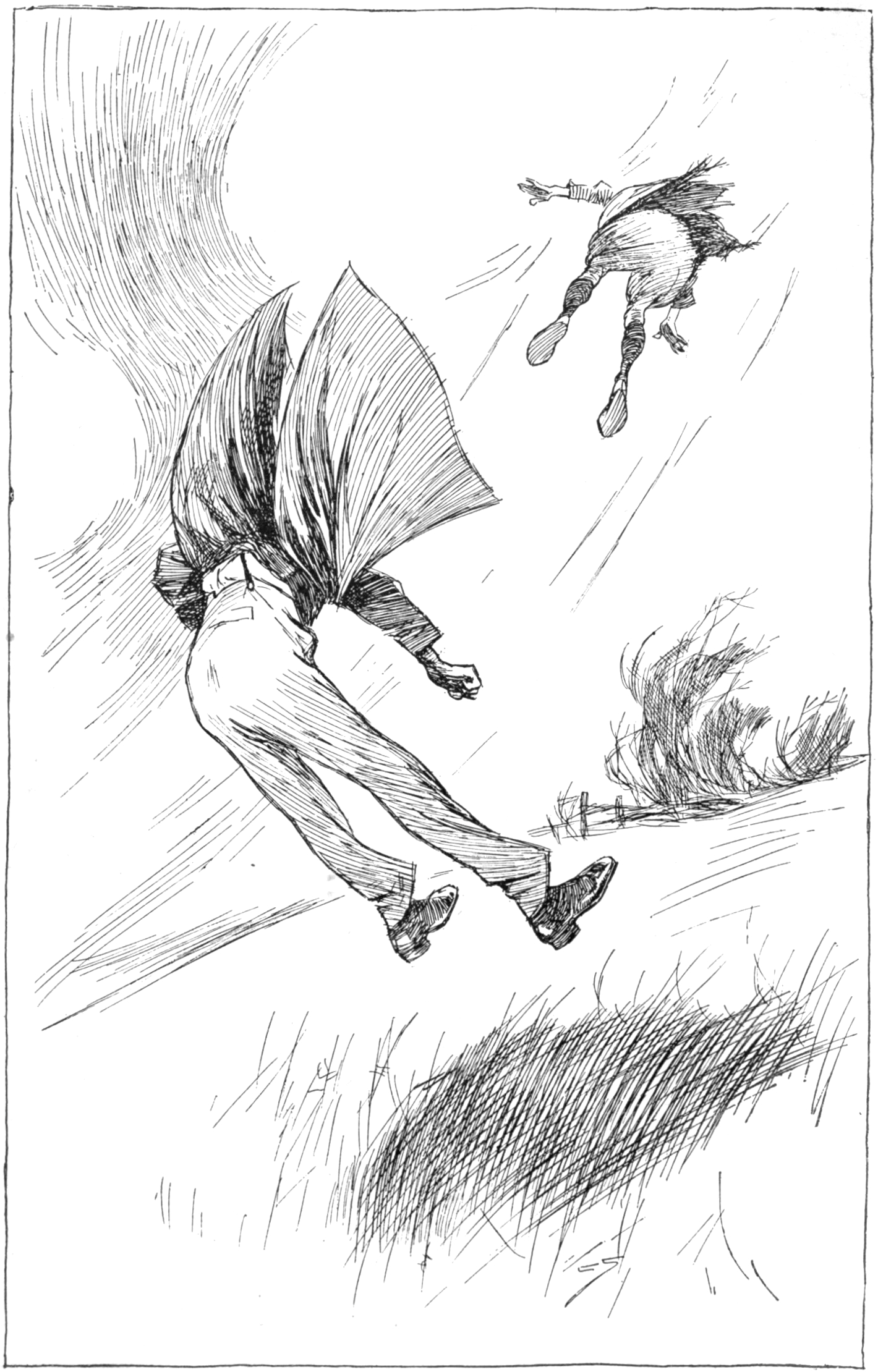
First Men in the Moon (1901). Frontispiece, illustration. Caption: "I was progressing in great leaps and bounds"

H. G. Wells's

genius was his ability to create a stream of brand new, wholly original stories out of thin air. Originality was Wells's calling card. In a six-year stretch from 1895 to 1901, he produced a stream of what he called "scientific romance" novels, which included The Time Machine, The Island of Doctor Moreau, The Invisible Man, The War of the Worlds and The First Men in the Moon.

— Cultural historian John Higgs, The Guardian.

=== Other writers ===
In the United Kingdom, Wells's work was a key model for the British "scientific romance", and other writers in that mode, such as Olaf Stapledon, J. D. Beresford, S. Fowler Wright, and Naomi Mitchison, all drew on Wells's example. Wells was also an important influence on British science fiction of the period after the Second World War, with Arthur C. Clarke and Brian Aldiss expressing strong admiration for Wells's work. The Space Machine: A Scientific Romance, by English writer Christopher Priest, published in 1976, is another work influenced by Wells. This novel effectively combines the storylines of the H.G. Wells novels The War of the Worlds (1898) and The Time Machine (1895) into the same reality. Action takes place both in Victorian England and on Mars.

In an interview with The Paris Review, Vladimir Nabokov described Wells as his favourite writer when he was a boy and "a great artist." He went on to cite The Passionate Friends, Ann Veronica, The Time Machine, and The Country of the Blind as superior to anything else written by Wells's British contemporaries. Nabokov said: "His sociological cogitations can be safely ignored, of course, but his romances and fantasies are superb."

== Other authors and works ==
As noted, many European languages do not distinguish romances from novels. In France, for example, le roman is the term used for a novel.

=== United Kingdom ===
Though Mary Shelley's Frankenstein is infused with elements of the Gothic novel and the Romantic movement, Brian Aldiss has argued that it should be considered the first true science fiction story. (See H. G. Wells's scientific romance above).

R. D. Blackmore described Lorna Doone: A Romance of Exmoor, (1869) in his preface, as a romance and not a historical novel, because the author neither "dares, nor desires, to claim for it the dignity or cumber it with the difficulty of an historical novel." As such, it combines elements of traditional romance, of Sir Walter Scott's historical novel tradition, of the pastoral tradition, of traditional Victorian values, and of the contemporary sensation novel trend.

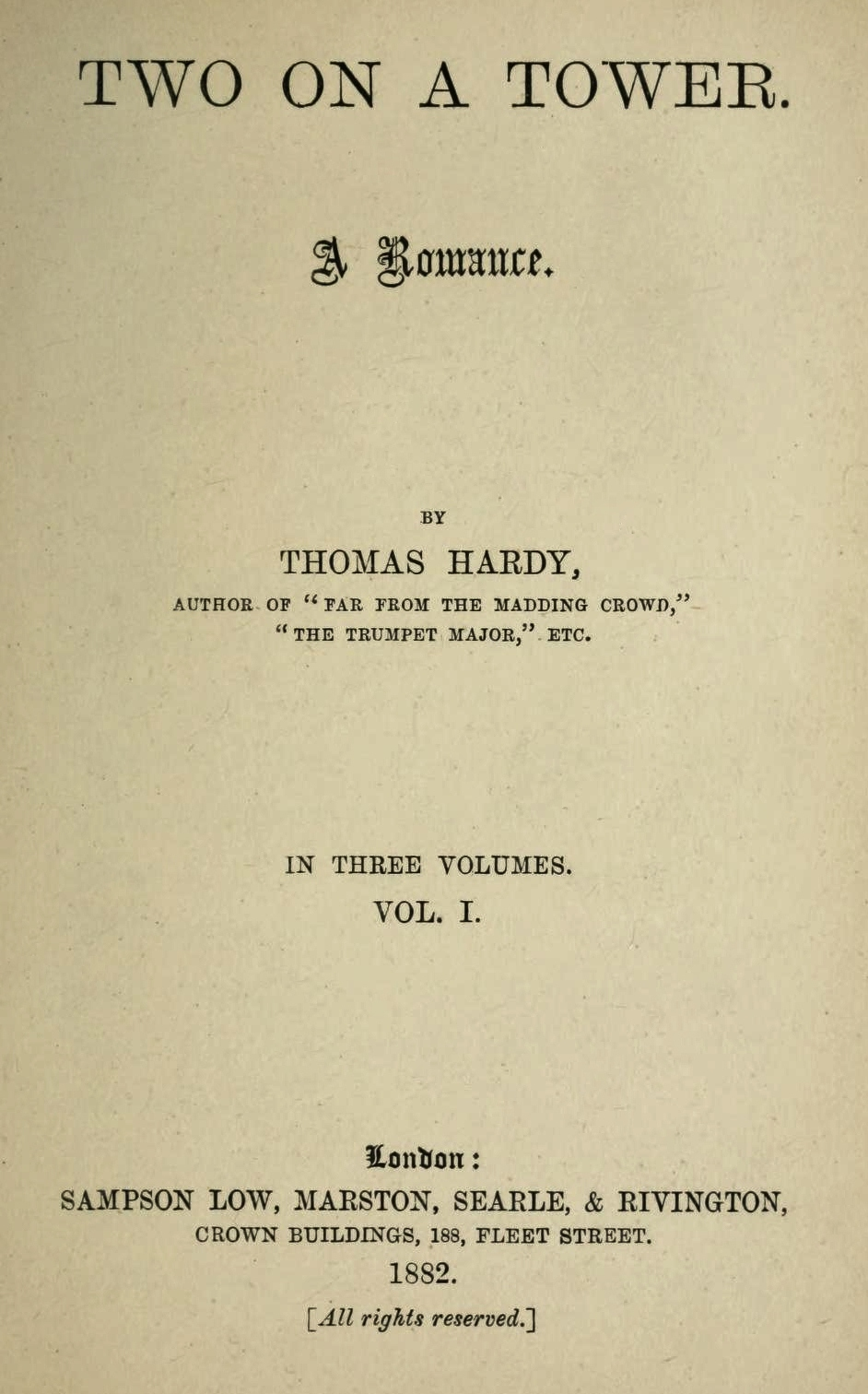
Thomas Hardy, Two on a Tower

Thomas Hardy classified his novels under three headings: "novels of character and environment", such as Tess of the D'Urbervilles; "novels of ingenuity", such as A Laodicean; "romances and fantasies", such as A Pair of Blue Eyes (1873); The Trumpet-Major (1880); Two on a Tower: A Romance (1882); A Group of Noble Dames (1891, a collection of short stories); The Well-Beloved: A Sketch of a Temperament (1897) (first published as a serial from 1892)

Amongst twentieth-century writers of romance are Joseph Conrad, Mary Webb, and John Cowper Powys. Joseph Conrad wrote Romance (1905), and The Rescue, A Romance of the Shallows (1920). Literary critic John Sutherland refers to Mary Webb as the pioneer of the genre of "soil and gloom romance".

John Cowper Powys describes Walter Scott's romances, as "by far the most powerful literary influence of my life". In A Glastonbury Romance Powys makes use of Arthurian mythology, and the Holy Grail story. Porius: A Romance of the Dark Ages is set during the end of Roman rule in Britain, with King Arthur, Myrddin (Merlin), Nineue (Lady of the Lake), and two survivors of an ancient race of giants. When John Cowper Powys began Owen Glendower in April 1937 he referred to it in his diary, as "my Romance about Owen Glyn Dwr ", but then, in subsequent years, he generally referred to it as a historical novel, and it was so sub-titled when it was published.

=== America ===
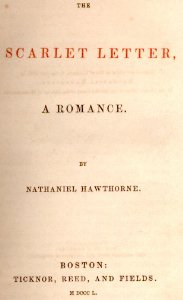
The Scarlett Letter (1850)

The Pilot: A Tale of the Sea is an early historical romance by James Fenimore Cooper. Its subject is the life of a naval pilot during the American Revolution. It is often considered the earliest example of nautical fiction in American literature. A sailor by profession, Cooper had undertaken to surpass Walter Scott's Pirate (1821) in seamanship. Cooper's most famous romance is Last of the Mohicans. According to Susan Fenimore Cooper, Cooper first conceived the idea for the book while visiting the Adirondack Mountains in 1825 with a party of English gentlemen. The party passed through the Catskills, an area with which Cooper was already familiar, They passed on to Lake George and Glens Falls. Impressed with the caves behind the falls, one member of the party suggested that "here was the very scene for a romance." Cooper promised "that a book should be written, in which these caves should have a place; the idea of a romance essentially Indian in character then first suggesting itself to his mind." Cooper has been called the "American Walter Scott." Critic Georg Lukacs likened Fenimore Cooper's character Bumppo in the Leatherstocking Tales to Sir Walter Scott's "middling characters; because they do not represent the extremes of society, these figures can serve as tools for the social and cultural exploration of historical events, without directly portraying the history itself".

In the mid–nineteenth century Hawthorne and Melville wrote romances. Nathaniel Hawthorne wrote: The Scarlet Letter: A Romance (1850); The House of the Seven Gables: A Romance; The Blithedale Romance. Herman Melville described Moby-Dick (1851) as a romance in a letter of June 27 to his English publisher:

My Dear Sir, — In the latter part of the coming autumn I shall have ready a new work; and I write you now to propose its publication in England. The book is a romance of adventure, founded upon certain wild legends in the Southern Sperm Whale Fisheries, and illustrated by the author's own personal experience, of two years & more, as a harpooneer.

In the twentieth century Flannery O'Connor (1925–1964) often wrote in a sardonic Southern Gothic style and relied heavily on regional settings and grotesque characters, often in violent situations. Her stories usually focus on morally flawed characters, frequently interacting with people with disabilities or disabled themselves (as O'Connor was), while the issue of race often appears. Most of her works feature disturbing elements.

=== Germany ===
E. T. A. Hoffmann (1776–1822) was a German Romantic author of fantasy and Gothic horror. Ludwig Tieck, Heinrich von Kleist, and E. T. A. Hoffmann "also profoundly influenced the development of European Gothic horror in the nineteenth century".

Hoffmann's novel The Devil's Elixirs (1815) was influenced by Lewis's The Monk and even mentions it. The novel also explores the motif of the Doppelgänger, the term coined by another German author and supporter of Hoffmann, Jean Paul, in his humorous novel Siebenkäs (1796–1797).

=== France ===
Balzac was an inheritor of Walter Scott's style of the historical novel, publishing in 1829 Les Chouans, a historical work in the manner of Sir Walter Scott, set in 1799 Brittany. This was subsequently incorporated into La Comédie Humaine. The bulk La Comédie Humaine, however, takes place during the Bourbon Restoration and the July Monarchy, and Balzac is regarded as one of the founders of realism in European literature. Séraphîta, with its theme of androgyny, contrasts with the realism of most of the author's best known works, delving into the fantastic and the supernatural to illustrate philosophical themes.

Amongst writers of adventure novels were Alexandre Dumas, Jules Verne, and Louis Henri Boussenard. Dumas was the author of The d'Artagnan Romances, which includes The Three Musketeers, which is also a historical novel. Jules Verne (1828–1905) was the author a series of bestselling novels that includes Journey to the Center of the Earth (1864), Twenty Thousand Leagues Under the Seas (1870), and Around the World in Eighty Days (1872). His novels, always very well documented, are generally set in the second half of the 19th century, taking into account the technological advances of the time.

Louis Henri Boussenard (1847–1910) ) was dubbed "the French Rider Haggard" during his lifetime, but better known today in Eastern Europe than in Francophone countries. Boussenard's best-known book Le Capitaine Casse-Cou (1901) was set at the time of the Boer War. L'île en feu (1898) fictionalized Cuba's struggle for independence. Aspiring to emulate Jules Verne, Boussenard also turned out several science fiction novels, notably Les secrets de monsieur Synthèse (1888) and Dix mille ans dans un bloc de glace (1890), both translated by Brian Stableford in 2013 under the title Monsieur Synthesis.

Victor Hugo's The Hunchback of Notre-Dame is a gothic, historical novel.

=== Italy ===
Alessandro Manzoni's The Betrothed (1827) is an historical novel set in Lombardy in 1628, during the years of Spanish rule, which has similarities with Walter Scott's historic novel Ivanhoe, although evidently distinct. Georg Lukàcs, in The Historical Novel (1969) comments:

In Italy Scott found a successor who, though in a single, isolated work, nevertheless broadened his tendencies with superb originality, in some respect surpassing him. We refer, of course, to Manzoni's I Promessi Sposi (The Betrothed). Scott himself recognized Manzoni's greatness. When in Milan Manzoni told him that he was his pupil, Scott replied that in that case Manzoni's was his best work. It is, however, very characteristic that while Scott was able to write a profusion of novels about English and Scottish society, Manzoni confined himself to this single masterpiece (p.69)

Emilio Salgari (1862–1911) was a writer of action adventure swashbucklers and a pioneer of science fiction. Many of his most popular novels have been adapted as comics, animated series and feature films. He is considered the father of Italian adventure fiction and Italian pop culture, and the "grandfather" of the Spaghetti Western.

=== Russia ===
Walter Scott was perhaps more popular in Russia, "in the late 1820s and 1830s", than anywhere "on the Continent", through the French translations of Auguste- Jean-Baptiste Defauconpret. Amongst "pilgrims to Abbotsford [were] a large proportion of Russian writers, diplomats, soldiers."

Walter Scott "very profoundly influenced" Pushkin, "in his capacity [as] a poet, ... a collector of folk-songs and ... the originator of the historical novel based on life ... We know that Pushkin's library contained not only Walter Scott's novels, but also his poetical works".

Tolstoy's "great-great-grandson Vladimir Tolstoy, 36, inspected the recently renovated Scott Monument in Edinburgh and suggested that "without the inspiration of Scott's writing genius his famous ancestor might never have penned War and Peace". "Mr Tolstoy ... the director of the Leo Tolstoy Museum and president of the Russian Museums' Association, said his great-great grandfather drew great inspiration from Scott's novels, particularly Waverley, Ivanhoe, and Rob Roy." He also noted that "In the library of the Tolstoy Museum in Russia there are many of Scott's books, including some early editions". He "said some of Scott's books in the museum's library had comments written by Leo Tolstoy beside the text - but he would not reveal what they said".

=== Spain ===
The historical novel developed in imitation of Walter Scott (80 of his works had been translated). The most notable Spanish authors are: Enrique Gil y Carrasco 1815–1846, the author of El señor de Bembibre, the best Spanish historical novel, written in imitation of Scott; Francisco Navarro Villoslada (1818–1895), who wrote a series of historical novels when the romantic genre was in decline and Realism was coming to be at its height. His novels were inspired by Basque traditions, and were set in the medieval era. His most famous work is Amaya, o los vascos en el siglo VIII (Amaya, or the Basques of the 8th century), in which the Basques and the Visigoths ally themselves against the Muslim invasion. Other authors include Mariano José de Larra, Serafín Estébanez Calderón and Francisco Martínez de la Rosa.
