= Bowery to Bagdad =

1955 film by Edward Bernds

- Directed by: Edward Bernds
- Written by: Edward Bernds; Elwood Ulman
- Produced by: Ben Schwalb
- Starring: Leo Gorcey; Huntz Hall; David Gorcey; Bernard Gorcey
- Cinematography: Harry Neumann
- Edited by: Lester A. Sansom
- Music by: Marlin Skiles
- Production company: Allied Artists Pictures
- Distributed by: Allied Artists Pictures
- Release date: January 2, 1955 (U.S.)
- Running time: 64 minutes
- Country: United States
- Language: English

Bowery to Bagdad is a 1955 comedy film starring The Bowery Boys. The film was released on January 2, 1955, by Allied Artists and is the thirty-sixth film in the series.

== Plot ==
Sach buys a magic lamp containing a Genie. A group of gangsters see the boys using the lamp and steal it. However, the boys had made a wish that only the Slip and Sach could request wishes from the Genie so he is unable to grant the gangsters wishes. The gangsters decide that if the two of them were dead then the Genie would have no choice but to obey their commands. The Genie has taken a liking to the boys and helps them escape, but they are transported to Baghdad where the rightful master of the lamp resides. With Slip and Sach no longer in control of the lamp, the master commands the Genie to "send them back whence they came". Back in their normal surroundings, the Genie reappears, feeling sorry for them, and grants them one more wish. Sach says, "I wish I had the nerve to sock him (Slip) in the chin," which the Genie grants.

== Cast ==
=== The Bowery Boys ===
- Leo Gorcey as Terrance Aloysius 'Slip' Mahoney
- Huntz Hall as Horace Debussy 'Sach' Jones
- David Gorcey as Chuck Anderson (Credited as David Condon)
- Bennie Bartlett as Butch Williams

=== Remaining cast ===
- Bernard Gorcey as Louie Dumbrowski
- Joan Shawlee as Velma (a/k/a Cindy Lou Calhoun)
- Eric Blore as the Genie

== International release ==
This film was released in England in October 1954.

== Home media ==
Warner Archives released the film on made-to-order DVD in the United States as part of "The Bowery Boys, Volume Four" on August 26, 2014.

== Reception ==
The film contains offensive anti-Arab stereotypes, wrote Jack G. Shaheen in Reel Bad Arabs. The genie, who is dressed in a wide sash and turban, is depicted as sexually aggressive and unintelligent. Characters refer to him as a "monkey" and an "animated Turkish towel." There are also repeated depictions of Arab men as violent, and a stereotypical image of a harem.

Preceded by Jungle Gents; 1954	'The Bowery Boys' movies 1946-1958	Succeeded by High Society; 1955
