= The Shadow of the East =

1921 novel

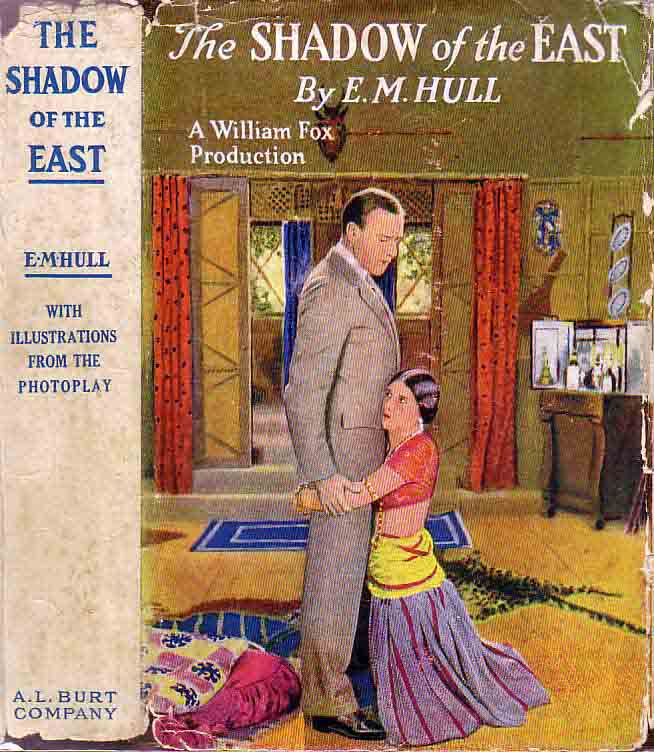
- Author: Edith Maud Hull
- Language: English
- Genre: Romance; Drama
- Publisher: Eveleigh Nash (UK); A. L. Burt (US)
- Publication date: 1921
- Publication place: United Kingdom
- Media type: Print

The Shadow of the East is a 1921 romance novel by the British author Edith Maud Hull. The American edition was first published by A. L. Burt of Boston.

== Film adaptation ==
In the wake of the successful screen adaptation of another of Hull's novels The Sheik it was adapted into a 1924 film The Shadow of the Desert by Fox Film. Directed by George Archainbaud it starred Frank Mayo, Mildred Harris and Norman Kerry.

== Bibliography ==
- Goble, Alan. The Complete Index to Literary Sources in Film. Walter de Gruyter, 1999.
- Kuehn, Julia. A Female Poetics of Empire: From Eliot to Woolf. Routledge, 2013.
- Soister, John T. Nicolella, Henry & Joyce, Steve. American Silent Horror, Science Fiction and Fantasy Feature Films, 1913-1929. McFarland, 2014.
