= Reel Bad Arabs =

- Directed by: Sut Jhally
- Written by: Jack Shaheen, Jeremy Earp
- Produced by: Jeremy Earp
- Starring: Jack Shaheen
- Edited by: Sut Jhally, Andrew Killoy, Mary Patierno
- Music by: Simon Shaheen
- Release date: 1 November 2006
- Running time: 50 minutes
- Country: United States
- Language: English

Reel Bad Arabs: How Hollywood Vilifies a People is a documentary film directed by Sut Jhally and produced by Media Education Foundation in 2006. This film is an extension of the book of the same name by Jack Shaheen, which also analyzes how Hollywood corrupts or manipulates the image of Arabs. The documentary analyzes 1,000 films that have Arab and Muslim characters, produced between 1896 and 2000, out of which great majority, 936 titles, were negative in their portrayal, arguing that the slander of Arabs in American filmmaking has existed since the early days of the silent cinema and is present in the biggest Hollywood blockbusters today. Jack Shaheen analyzes a long series of "demeaning" images of Arabs through his presentation of various scenes from different American movies which he has studied. He argues that this image is characterized by showing Arabs either as bandits or as a savage, nomadic race, or shows Arab women as shallow belly dancers serving evil, naïve, and greedy Arab sheiks. Most important is the image of the rifle in the hands of Arab "terrorists". The film then attempts to explain the motivations behind these stereotypes about Arabs, and their development at key points in American history, as well as why it is so important today.

The film showed for the first time in Washington on 8 June 2007 and then in Los Angeles in the 20 June 2007. The run time of the film is 50 minutes, with Arabic and English subtitles. Soon afterward, the film was shown successively in more than a dozen of international film festivals between 2006 and 2009 The film's estimated budget is $100,000.

== Synopsis ==
Shaheen speaks at the beginning of the documentary about the extent to which Arabs face slander and manipulation in Hollywood, commenting that he has formulated that view of his after having seen over a thousand films produced, in the past and in the present. He also talks about how bleak the views are, those of which are borne by the Western civilization (and he refers to it as our civilization), admittedly confessing how the views directly attack the Arabs' humanity. Furthermore, he mentions how the same image took shape in several patterns to feed the same substance that is continuously demonizing the Arabs, thus. The image had to repeat over and over and was depicted in scenes in several films that heavily abuse the Arabs' behaviors and morals.

All through the documentary, Shaheen's statements are illustrated by clips from the films he describes.

Shaheen reviews some of the images about Arabs he perceives as distorted, and argues this causes a process of feeding/poisoning the minds of the younger generations with these infected ideas about Arabs that characterizes them with such heinous and harmful descriptions as in the Disney motion picture, Aladdin. Shaheen also turns it around: what must viewers from the Arab world think of America and Americans when they keep seeing these images in American films?

Shaheen also argues that the image of the Arab woman is distorted and does not represent her. Arab women in films are either belly dancers or faceless, anonymous shapes in black robes. More recently Arab women are also portrayed as terrorists. The truth is, they are just like all other women in the world: talented, intelligent, and equal in all areas and fields.

Shaheen then argues that politics have a big role in affecting Hollywood's image about Arabs, and moreover, both Hollywood and politics feed and empower the other. He stresses that filmmakers openly acknowledge this interaction between Hollywood and American politics by citing Jack Valenti, longtime president of the Motion Picture Association of America: "Washington and Hollywood spring from the same DNA". Political and economic events like the crisis of high oil prices in the United States as a result of the Arabs refusal of exporting it to The States, the revolution in Iran (a non-Arab country) as well as al-Qaeda activities, the events of 9/11 and others, all exported a bad, faded image about Arabs to every American home... It is a truly a very distorted picture. Both the book and the film to reveal the American film scene history, where they exposed a blatant pattern of profiling to stereotype the Arabs and they also showed the similarity of this stereotype with the racist, anti-Semitic caricature and cartoon art throughout history.

Alleging a political agenda, he says out of 1,000 films that have Arab and Muslim characters (from the year 1896 to 2000), 12 were positive depictions, 52 were neutral portrayals of Arabs, and 936 were negative.

Although the negative imagery of Arabs and the Arab world in the film is a hundred years old, Shaheen also voices optimism about the future. Showing some examples of films that portray Arabs as ordinary people, he expects the negative images to change, due to the works of a new generation of filmmakers, who see things differently.

=== Arabs stereotypes reportedly found in movies ===
1. The bad Arab character that is always evil and portrayed as a "terrorist" causing explosions, shootings, stabbings, offenses and attacks.
2. The shallow or silly Arab character that is always naive, pursuing only fun, lust, and extravagance.
3. The Bedouin Arab character, that is remotely far from civilization and science and is often accompanied by "tent" and "camel" images.
4. The arrogant Arab character that is very nervous, repressive of women, and the farthest possible from emotions or romance.
5. The depiction of Arab women as either hypersexualized figures (such as belly dancers) or as oppressed and voiceless individuals, lacking agency or complexity.

=== Films which depict these stereotypes and negative images include ===
- The Sheik - 1921
- A Son of the Sahara - 1924
- The Thief of Bagdad - 1924
- A Cafe in Cairo - 1924
- The Son of the Sheik - 1926
- The Desert Bride - 1928
- Invitation to the Dance - 1956
- Exodus - 1960
- Harum Scarum - 1965
- Cast a Giant Shadow - 1966
- The Black Stallion - 1975
- Network - 1976
- The Happy Hooker Goes to Washington - 1977
- Black Sunday - 1977
- Chapter Two - 1979
- Raiders of the Lost Ark - 1981
- Rollover - 1981
- The Black Stallion Returns - 1983
- Never Say Never Again - 1983
- Sahara - 1983
- Cannonball Run II - 1984
- Protocol – 1984
- Back to the Future – 1985
- The Jewel of the Nile - 1985
- Hell Squad - 1985
- The Delta Force – 1986
- Iron Eagle – 1986
- Death Before Dishonor - 1987
- Ishtar - 1987
- Wanted: Dead or Alive - 1987
- The Taking of Flight 847: The Uli Derickson Story – 1988
- Indiana Jones and the Last Crusade - 1989
- The Bonfire of the Vanities – 1990
- Navy SEALs – 1990
- Patriot Games - 1992
- Aladdin - 1992
- Son of the Pink Panther - 1993
- True Lies – 1994
- Father of the Bride Part II - 1995
- Bloodfist VI: Ground Zero – 1995
- Executive Decision - 1996
- Ernest in the Army - 1998
- The Siege - 1998
- The Mummy - 1999
- Rules of Engagement – 2000
- Gladiator - 2000
- Black Hawk Down - 2002
- 24 - TV series
- Sleeper Cell - TV series

=== Films which depict a positive image include ===
- A Perfect Murder - 1998
- Hideous Kinky - 1998
- The 13th Warrior – 1999
- Three Kings – 1999
- Kingdom of Heaven – 2005

== Cast ==
Filmmaker information

- Narrator: Jack Shaheen
- Director: Sut Jhally
- Producer: Jeremy Earp
- Post-Production Supervisor: Andrew Killoy
- Editors: Sut Jhally, Andrew Killoy, Mary Patierno
- Additional Editing: Jeremy Smith
- Sound Engineering: Peter Acker, Armadillo Audio Group
- Media Research & Collection: Kenyon King, Bathsheba Ratzkoff
- Subtitling: Jason Young
- Arabic Translation: Huda Yehia, The Translation Center at the University of Massachusetts
- Graphic Designer: Shannon McKenna
- Additional Motion Graphics: Janet Brockelhurst
- Production Assistant: Jason Young
- DVD Authoring: Andrew Killoy, Jeremy Smith
- Additional Footage Provided by: Mary Patierno, The Newsmarket.

== Reception ==
=== Film festivals ===
The film festivals that showed the documentary are:

- Official Selection, 2009 Cinemateket, Norwegian Film Institute
- Official Selection, 2009 Chicago Arabesque
- Official Selection, 2009 Arab Film Festival, Calgary
- Official Selection, 2008 Palestinian Film Festival, Sydney
- Official Selection, 2008 Nazariya Films for PEACE Festival
- Official Selection, 2008 One World Berlin Film Festival
- Official Selection, 2008 Mostra Mundo Arabe de Cinema
- Official Selection, 2008 Festival del integracion de Valencia
- Official Selection, 2008 Our Island, Our World Film Film Festival
- Official Selection, 2008 Adelaide Festival of Arts
- Official Selection, 2007 Arabian Sights Film Festival
- Official Selection, 2007 Arab Film Festival
- Official Selection, 2007 Cinema East Film Festival
- Official Selection, 2007 Date Palm Film Festival
- Official Selection, 2007 Brisbane International Film Festival
- Official Selection, 2007 Liverpool Arabic Arts Festival
- Official Selection, 2007 National Conference for Media Reform
- Official Selection, 2006 Dubai International Film Festival

== See also ==
- Reel Injun
- Orientalism
- Stereotypes of Arabs and Muslims in the United States
