= Forced seduction =

Literary theme used in romance novels and soap operas

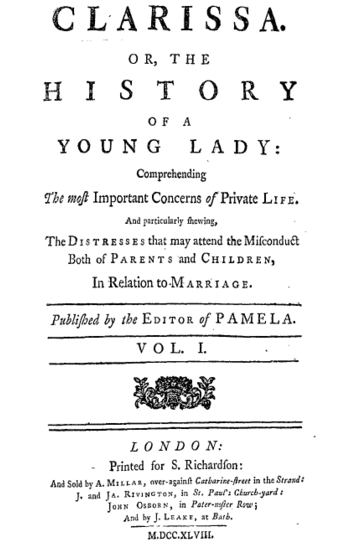
Samuel Richardson's Clarissa (1748) features a forced seduction.

Forced seduction is a theme found frequently in Western literature (mainly romance novels and soap operas) wherein man-on-woman rape eventually turns into a genuine love affair.

In one source, forced seduction is summarized as follows: "Once upon a time there was a very pretty girl. She was raped. The boy begged for forgiveness, and they lived happily ever after." (translation from Dutch)

== Romance novels ==
The history of forced seduction is as old as Western literature and mythology: well known from Greek mythology is the Rape of Europa, which tells of Zeus, disguised as a beautiful white bull, seducing Europa. When she climbs on his back he swims to Crete, where he seduces her and later makes her queen of Crete. The story is retold by Ovid in his Metamorphoses, with Jupiter standing in for Zeus. The Greek had a specific turn of phrase to describe "a woman's rape by a god"; whether one should properly speak of rape or of seduction is a matter of contention.

In post-Renaissance literature of the Western world, an early portrayal of a rape victim falling in love with her rapist occurs in Aphra Behn's The Dumb Virgin (1700). The theme later appeared in many works of popular literature. A well-known example of a rapist who is reformed by his victim is Lovelace in Samuel Richardson's Clarissa; or, The History of a Young Lady (1748) Richardson's Pamela; or, Virtue Rewarded (1740) had already featured an almost-rapist whose victim falls in love with him; according to Frances Ferguson, it is Pamela herself who "rereads Mr. B's attempted rape as seduction". The death of Richardson's Clarissa character was echoed in many American novels of the 18th century, in which the female victims of "seduction" frequently died in a blurring of the boundaries between seduction and rape.

An early 20th-century example of forced seduction is the 1919 novel The Sheik by Edith Maude Hull, in which a Western woman is held captive by an Algerian sheik and raped repeatedly, realizing after months of being raped that she loves him; The Sheik is regarded as an "ur-romance". The theme was quite common in romance novels from the 1970s and 1980s, the beginning of the modern wave of erotic romance; so-called "bodice rippers" advertised it on their very covers, which featured "half-clothed women with heaving bosoms being ravished by shirtless, overpowering men". To maintain a distance between the reality of the reader and the fiction of the romance novel, such novels were frequently given a "remote historical setting allowing women to 'enjoy' the rape fantasy from a safe distance". Kathleen E. Woodiwiss's The Flame and the Flower (1972) is one of the earliest and best-known examples from this period.

Romance novelist Jaid Black (pseudonym for Tina Engler) said that "many of my female readers enjoy rape fantasies, key word being fantasies. They certainly wouldn't want it to happen in real life, but enjoy the escapism and total lack of control provided by 'forced seduction' scenes in erotic romance novels". According to one reader of romance, women readers are quite capable of separating fantasy from reality: "In real life there is no such thing as forced seduction. When a woman says no in real life, that means no, because in real life, rape is about violence and power. Rape in real life involves no pleasure for the woman". Alison Kent, author of the Complete Idiot's Guide to Writing Erotic Romance, says the theme is rare in modern romance novels; Linda Lee also cites scholarship to conclude that "by the mid-1980s, the rape fantasy was rejected". However, forced seduction has been used as a plot point in post-1980s romance novels.

== Analysis ==
Stevi Jackson, a scholar of gender and sexuality, begins an analysis of forced seduction (in "The Social Context of Rape", first published 1978) with the "sexual scripts" that culture male and female sexuality, which for the male posit "supposedly uncontrollable sexual aggression". "Conventional sexual scripts" also dictate that "a woman's satisfaction is assumed to be dependent on male activity" and that "women need some degree of persuasion" before they will engage in sex. Once this obstacle (dictated by inhibitions and propriety) is overcome, they gladly surrender themselves: "the masterful male and yielding female form a common motif of our popular culture", lending credibility to not a female but rather a male rape fantasy. Jackson's generalizing comment on seduction from this article is cited in at least two legal and ethical studies: "It may not be that rape is forced seduction but that seduction is a subtler form of rape".

In "Even Sociologists Fall in Love" (1993), Jackson takes scholars of "ideal romances" to task for conflating two competing ideas about love—the need for nurturing, which she says for heterosexual women is frequently not fulfilled, and "romantic desire experienced as overwhelming, insatiable". The latter desire is frequently found in romances, and "the hero often rapes the heroine in these novels"—novels in which "spectacularly masculine" heroes hurt and humiliate women characters but reveal their "softer side" when they "declare [their] love" for their victims. Such novels portray male desire as uncontrollable, thus proposing that it is actually the woman, as a motor for male desire, who is in charge of the man; "the attraction of romance for women may well lie in their material powerlessness".

Angela Toscano, in a 2012 study, states that earlier studies of the theme have focused too much on sociological and psychological aspects, and rejects the notion that first, all romance novels can be treated the same way, and second, that the theme somehow "constitutes an instantiation of some fictive collective female consciousness (in which all women operate as a single affective entity, like the Borg)". Toscano claims to study rape in romance within a narrative context, distinguishing between three types. The first two types ("Rape of Mistaken Identity" and "Rape of Possession") exemplify the violence always involved in breaking down a barrier between the subject (the hero) and the Other (the heroine) whose identity and desire are as yet somehow essentially unknown to the raping subject. Toscano argues that not all rapes in romance are forced seductions; the latter is, rather, what she calls "Rape of Coercion", and comes about through the desire on the part of the hero to come to know the heroine—"the hero wants a response from the heroine because it is in her dialogue with him that her identity is revealed. But instead of waiting for her freely to speak to him the hero forces the heroine to respond to his sexual and verbal assault". In the end, according to Toscano, "the true violation is not the rape at all, but the act of falling in love".

== In soap operas ==
In American soap operas, a well-known example of forced seduction is the supercouple Luke and Laura from General Hospital. In Thai television soap opera, the theme is quite common. A Thai study from 2008 reported that among 2000 viewers aged 13 to 19, 20 percent reported that the rapes were their favorite element in soaps, and an equal number thought that "rape was a normal and acceptable element in society". Sitthiwat Tappan, a director of Thai soaps, said that the depicted and suggested rapes in these shows provide a valuable lesson: they teach women not to venture out alone or dress provocatively, and teach men not to drink too much. In 2014, the rape and murder of a thirteen-year-old girl on a train resulted in intense public discussion around the propagation of rape culture. A petition to "stop romanticizing rape on television" quickly received 30,000 signatures.

== See also ==
- The Marquise of O
- Hybristophilia
- History of rape
- Rape fantasy
- Stockholm syndrome, phenomenon in which hostages develop positive feelings toward their captors
