= The Shadow of the Desert =

1924 film

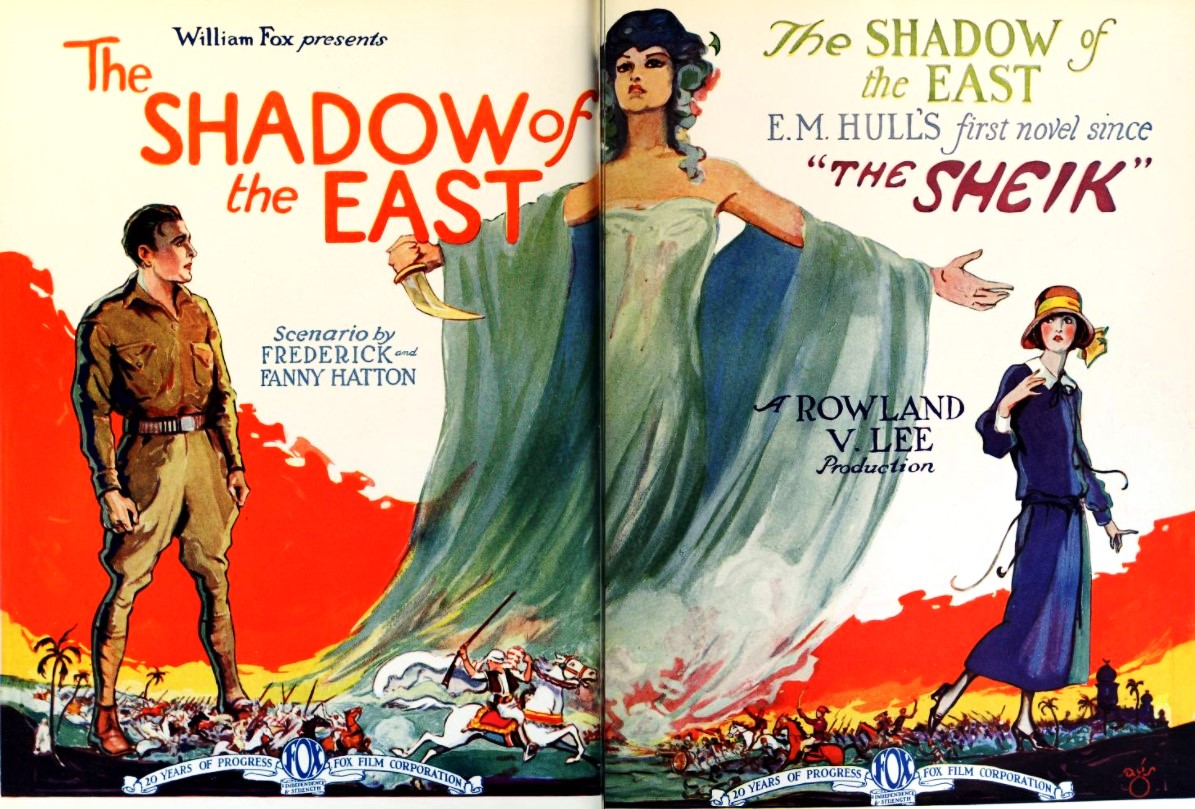
- Advertisement
- Directed by: George Archainbaud
- Written by: Fanny Hatton; Frederic Hatton
- Based on: The Shadow of the East by Edith Maude Hull
- Starring: Frank Mayo
- Cinematography: Jules Cronjager
- Distributed by: Fox Film Corporation
- Release date: January 27, 1924
- Running time: 6 reels (approx. 60 minutes)
- Country: United States
- Language: Silent (English intertitles)

The Shadow of the Desert (also released under its original title The Shadow of the East) is a 1924 American silent horror film directed by George Archainbaud. The film is based upon the novel The Shadow of the East by Edith Maude Hull, who also wrote the best-selling desert romance The Sheik.

== Plot ==
As described in a review of the film in a film magazine, Barry Craven (Mayo) is a young Englishman living in India who has taken a native wife, Lolaire (Brent). Barry meets his old university friend Said (Kerry), a polished gentleman who is the son of an Algerian sheik. John Locke (Swickard) and his daughter Gillian (Harris) visit India, and Barry’s former love for Gillian returns; but he cannot marry her as he has a native wife. Crazed by jealousy, Lolaire kills herself. Barry is called back to England and marries Gillian. His Hindu servant Kunwar (Grassby), through his command of oriental mysticism, casts a spell on Barry that makes him feel remorse for his former wife Lolaire’s death. This remorse causes Barry to leave Gillian. He goes to the desert and joins Said to help fight a bandit chief. Gillian arrives on the scene. Said denies that he is with Barry and attempts to force himself on Gillian, but his better nature asserts itself. A messenger comes to Said and tells him of Barry’s danger. Said repents, sends aid, rescues Barry, and restores Gillian to him. Barry’s servant Kunwar is killed and with his death the curse, which was the shadow of the east, is lifted.

== Cast ==
- Frank Mayo as Barry Craven
- Mildred Harris as Gillian Locke
- Norman Kerry as Said
- Bertram Grassby as Kunwar Singh
- Evelyn Brent as Lolaire
- Edythe Chapman as Aunt Caroline
- Josef Swickard as John Locke (credited as Joseph Swickard)
- Lorimer Johnston as Peter Peters (credited as Lorimer Johnson)
- Toy Gallagher (uncredited)
- Sherwood Mertz (uncredited)

== Preservation ==
With no prints of The Shadow of the Desert located in any film archives, it is a lost film.

== See also ==
- 1937 Fox vault fire
- List of Fox Film films
