= The Captive of the Sahara =

1931 novel

- Author: Edith Maud Hull
- Language: English
- Genre: Romance; Drama
- Publisher: Methuen (UK); Dodd, Mead (US)
- Publication date: 1931
- Publication place: United Kingdom
- Media type: Print

The Captive of the Sahara is a 1931 novel by the British author Edith Maud Hull. Hull was best known for her novel The Sheik and other novels set in North Africa and the Middle East. The plot features a relationship against the backdrop of the Sahara Desert. Unlike several of her earlier novels it was not adapted into a film.

== Bibliography ==
- Bloom, Clive. Bestsellers: Popular Fiction since 1900. Springer, 2008.
- Kuehn, Julia. A Female Poetics of Empire: From Eliot to Woolf. Routledge, 2013.
- Teo, Hsu-Ming. Desert Passions: Orientalism and Romance Novels. University of Texas Press, 2012.
