= Harum Scarum =

1965 film by Gene Nelson

- Theatrical release poster
- Directed by: Gene Nelson
- Written by: Gerald Drayson Adams
- Produced by: Sam Katzman
- Starring: Elvis Presley; Mary Ann Mobley; Fran Jeffries; Michael Ansara
- Cinematography: Fred Jackman Jr.
- Edited by: Ben Lewis
- Music by: Fred Karger
- Production company: Four-Leaf Productions
- Distributed by: Metro-Goldwyn-Mayer
- Release date: November 24, 1965 (USA)
- Running time: 85 minutes
- Country: United States
- Language: English
- Budget: $1,400,000
- Box office: $2,000,000 (rentals)

Harum Scarum (released in the United Kingdom as Harem Holiday) is a 1965 American musical comedy film starring Elvis Presley. It was shot on the original Cecil B. DeMille set from the film The King of Kings, with additional footage shot on location at the Iverson Movie Ranch in Chatsworth, Los Angeles. Some of the film was based on Rudolph Valentino's 1921 movie The Sheik.

The film reached #11 on the Variety national weekly box office chart, earned $2 million at the box office, and finished #40 on the year end list of the top-grossing films of 1965. The film is listed in Golden Raspberry Award founder John Wilson's book The Official Razzie Movie Guide as one of The 100 Most Enjoyably Bad Movies Ever Made.

== Plot ==
American movie star Johnny Tyrone goes to Baghdad to premiere his new picture. He is seduced by the lovely Aishah while on a plane, then kidnapped by a man named Sinan who wants Johnny to help him kill the king in the fictional town of Bar Esalaam. Johnny escapes the palace with the help of a slave girl, Shalimar. Once out of the palace walls, Johnny tells her that he was brought to the Middle East to assassinate the king, which causes Shalimar to run off in fear as she is actually the king's daughter.

Johnny meets up with his fellow escapee Zacha and makes a plan to foil the assassination plot by joining a troupe of musicians who will be going to entertain the people of Bar Esalaam on the last day of Ramadan. Johnny successfully befriends the troupe, but that night they are ambushed by Aishah and her men after being betrayed by Zacha. Aishah orders Johnny to go through with the assassination after threatening the lives of the musicians and their children. Meanwhile, Princess Shalimar can not shake the feelings she has for Johnny. On the day of the festivities Johnny reluctantly moves in to kill the King but is thwarted by Shalimar. Johnny, the musicians and the kids are sentenced to death.

The troupe is spared death after they are rescued by their associate, a dwarf named Baba. Johnny breaks into the King's room and convinces him that he was blackmailed into the plot by Sinan and also confesses his love for Shalimar. The King believes Johnny and helps him infiltrate Sinan's lair where it is revealed that the man who orchestrated the assassination plot was none other than the King's brother Prince Dragna. Johnny manages to overpower Sinan but learns that his army has grown in number and taken the town by force.

Johnny, The King, Shalimar, the musicians and the remorseful Zacha gather as many of the King's most loyal servants to battle the assassins and take back the town while the King enters Dragna's hideout vowing revenge. However it is revealed that rather than kill Dragna he has chosen to banish him after besting him in a game of chess. Johnny asks the King not to banish him to the United States. With order restored, Johnny and his new royal bride honeymoon in Las Vegas, along with a few of her dancing girls.

== Cast ==
- Elvis Presley as Johnny Tyronne
- Mary Ann Mobley as Princess Shalimar
- Fran Jeffries as Aishah
- Michael Ansara as Prince Dragna
- Jay Novello as Zacha
- Philip Reed as King Toranshah
- Theo Marcuse as Sinan
- Billy Barty as Baba
- Dirk Harvey as Mokar
- Jack Costanzo as Julna
- Larry Chance as Captain Herat
- Barbara Werle as Leilah
- Brenda Benet as Emerald
- Gail Gilmore as Sapphire
- Wilda Taylor as Amethyst
- Vicki Malkin as Sari
- Ryck Rydon as Mustapha
- Joey Russo as Yussef

== Production ==
Upon hearing about Harum Scarum for the first time, Elvis was excited about his character, seeing the role as similar to Rudolph Valentino in 1921's The Sheik. However, according to Priscilla Presley: "[...] as each day went by, his morale plummeted. Harum Scarum's plot was a joke, the character he played, a fool, and the songs he sang, disasters."

Similar to Elvis' misconception of the script, Colonel Tom Parker thought the film was a comedy and suggested introducing a talking camel. But Elvis was glad to make a million dollars in salary for this film, plus half of the profits from the box office.

== Home media ==
Harum Scarum was released on widescreen DVD in Region 1 by Warner Home Video on August 7, 2007.

== Reception ==
Vincent Canby of The New York Times wrote in a negative review that Presley walked through the film "with all the animation of a man under deep sedation, but then he had read the script". Variety wrote that the picture "suffers from a lack of imagination" in providing Presley with a "substantial showcase", but that the eight song numbers in the film would "probably meet with response similar to Presley's past entries". Margaret Harford of the Los Angeles Times wrote, "Nobody, least of all Elvis, can bring parody to heel in this effort from MGM, directed by Gene Nelson. Presley isn't Bob Hope and Mary Ann Mobley, beauty winner though she is, won't pass for Dorothy Lamour. Put them together and you realize right off that Harum Scarum isn't going to be much fun." Jack Shaheen listed Harum Scarum in his "Worst List" of films with anti-Arab stereotypes.

== See also ==
- List of American films of 1965
- Elvis Presley on film and television
