= Stereotypes of Arabs and Muslims in the United States =

Generalized representations about Muslims in the US

Stereotypes of Arabs and Muslims in the United States have been presented in various forms across American mass media and culture. Stereotypical representations of Arabs—including those from the Middle East and the Maghreb—frequently appear in media, literature, theater, and other creative outlets. While some Hollywood films have been praised for offering positive portrayals of Arabs and Muslims, the majority of representations remain negative.

Arab actors who have achieved stardom in Hollywood include Omar Sharif, widely regarded as the first Egyptian and Arab to find mainstream success in American cinema.

These largely negative portrayals have had tangible repercussions for Arab Americans and Muslims, influencing both daily social interactions and broader societal attitudes. Negative and inaccurate stereotypes are also present in American school textbooks, which, despite being less creative in nature, frequently misrepresent Arabs and Muslims.

Arab American women are often portrayed as exotic, characterized by subservience, silence, and an air of mystery, while being significantly constrained within their patriarchal Islamic religious communities. Additionally, they are exoticized due to their distinctive, foreign religious attire. For instance, it is commonly assumed that Arab American women are perpetually clad in hijabs or full-body burqas. Furthermore, they are perceived as lacking a voice within their families, yielding to their husbands, and devoid of independent identities. In the United States, Arab men are often portrayed as aggressive, angry, cruel, hostile, uncivilized, unkind, and unsociable.

== "Billionaires, bombers, and belly dancers" ==
A report titled 100 Years of Anti-Arab and Anti-Muslim Stereotyping by Mazin B. Qumsiyeh, director of media relations for the American-Arab Anti-Discrimination Committee, describes what some in the Arab American community refer to as the "three B syndrome": Arabs in American media are typically portrayed as bombers, belly dancers, or billionaires. This refers to a recurring depiction of Arab men as terrorists or wealthy oil magnates, and Arab women as exoticized sexual objects.

The report also highlights the harmful nature of these stereotypes, especially in cartoons, which often insult Arabs and Muslims. According to Qumsiyeh, such portrayals not only cause psychological harm but also contribute to dehumanization, which can lead to acts of physical violence. He writes:

Thomas Edison made a short film in 1897 for his patented Kinetoscope in which "Arab" women wearing enticing clothes dance to seduce a male audience. The short clip was called Fatima Dances. The trend shifted over the years and was dominated by the "billionaires" stereotype for a short while, especially during the oil crises of the 1970s. However, in the last 30 years, the predominant stereotype by far has been "Arab bombers".

In a piece published in the Los Angeles Times 28 July 1997, Laila Lalami offers a satirical "12-step guide" to making a successful Arab-bashing movie. Her list includes tropes such as: "the villains must all have beards", "they must all wear keffiehs", "they must have names like Ali, Abdul, or Mustapha", and "they must threaten to blow something up".

Following the September 11 attacks, Arab-American actors were increasingly typecast in roles depicting terrorists in film and television.

Jack Shaheen, professor emeritus of mass communications at Southern Illinois University, critically examined the portrayal of Arabs in American media in his book, The TV Arab (ISBN 0-87972-309-2). He identified more than 21 major films released over a ten-year span in which the U.S. military is depicted killing Arabs—frequently presenting them as terrorists or adversaries of the United States. Notable examples include:

- Iron Eagle (1986)
- Navy SEALs (1990)
- Patriot Games (1992)
- True Lies (1994)
- Executive Decision (1996)

In his book Reel Bad Arabs (ISBN 1-84437-019-4), Shaheen argues that "television's image of the Arab is omnipresent [and] is becoming a part of American folklore." He also observes that Arabs have "consistently appeared in American popular culture as billionaires, bombers, and belly dancers."

Shaheen further summarizes recurring negative stereotypes in American media portrayals, stating:

Arab Muslims are fanatics who believe in a different god, who don't value human life as much as we do. They are intent on destroying us (the West) with their oil or with their terrorism. The men seek to abduct and brutally seduce our women; they are without family, reside in a primitive place (the desert), and behave like primitive beings. The women are subservient—resembling black crows—or are portrayed as mute, somewhat exotic harem maidens.

Shaheen identified the following five films as among the worst offenders in terms of negative portrayals of Arabs in modern cinema:

- The Delta Force (1986)
- Wanted: Dead or Alive (1987), which, he writes, features "Arab thugs... plan[ning] to ignite Los Angeles... killing millions."
- Death Before Dishonor (1987)
- True Lies (1994), in which, according to Shaheen, "Arnold S. INC. shoots dead Palestinians like clay pigeons."
- Rules of Engagement (2000), which he describes as a film that "justifies U.S. Marines killing Arab women and children."

These stereotypes are also central to the semi-autobiographical film Driving to Zigzigland, in which actor and taxi driver Bashar Daas repeatedly finds himself typecast as an Arab Muslim extremist during film auditions in the United States.

Another widely discussed example of stereotyping is the character Achmed the Dead Terrorist, created by ventriloquist Jeff Dunham. The puppet, which portrays a skeletal suicide bomber with a mock Middle Eastern accent, has drawn criticism for reinforcing anti-Muslim and anti-Arab stereotypes.

== Airport racial profiling after 9/11 ==
In the aftermath of the September 11 attacks, in which 15 of the 19 hijackers were of Saudi Arabian origin and all were Muslim, Arabs and Muslims complained of increased scrutiny and racial profiling at airports. In a poll conducted by the Boston Globe, 71 percent of blacks and 57 percent of whites believed that "Arabs and Arab-Americans should undergo special, more intensive security checks before boarding airplanes." Some Muslims and Arabs complained of being held without explanation and subjected to hours of questioning and arrest without cause. Such cases have led to lawsuits by the American Civil Liberties Union. Fox News radio host Mike Gallagher suggested that airports have a "Muslims Only" line in the wake of the 9/11 attacks stating "It's time to have a Muslims check-point line in America's airports and have Muslims be scrutinized. You better believe it, it's time." In Queens, New York, Muslims and Arabs complained that the NYPD unfairly targets Muslim communities in raids tied to the alleged Zazi terror plot.

== Stereotypes in film and their effects ==
The 1999 film The 13th Warrior, starring Antonio Banderas as the Arab diplomat Ahmad ibn Fadlan, is credited with introducing a rare Muslim protagonist in a major Hollywood production. The film has since gained a devoted cult following, particularly among Muslim audiences.

Other films featuring Muslim protagonists include the biographical drama Ali (2001), starring Will Smith as Muhammad Ali, and Disney's live-action adaptation Aladdin (2019), with Mena Massoud portraying the titular character. These productions have been noted for offering more positive and nuanced depictions of Arab and Muslim characters in mainstream cinema.

The 1975 film The Wind and the Lion, starring Sean Connery as Moroccan leader Mulai Ahmed er Raisuni, has also been praised in some reviews for presenting a more dignified portrayal of a Muslim character.

Stereotypes that the west has of the Middle East have made their way into the film industry, including that Muslims are terrorists, that all Muslims and Arabs look alike, and that the women are oppressed and abused, are only housewives and don't work. The TV series Homeland has been criticized for depicting Islam as "inherently violent and backward", with "[e]very single adult male Muslim character" being connected to terrorism. Films such as American Sniper and Argo have also been criticized for depicting Muslims as violent and deceitful.

When impressionable children in the US who may not have much experience with Muslims or Arabs see negative depictions of Arabs they come to believe that this is reality. Children who had had some exposure to Muslims or were familiar with Islam viewed Arab Muslims more positively than less knowledgeable children.

== See also ==
- Anti-Arabism
- Reel Bad Arabs
- Ethnic stereotype
- Flying while Muslim
- Islamophobia in the United States
- Orientalism
- Orientalism, a 1978 book by Edward Said
- Public diplomacy of Israel
- Racial profiling
- Stereotype threat
- Stereotypes of groups within the United States
