= Portrayal of Arabs in film =

Arabs are portrayed in film as film characters in both Arab films as well as non-Arab films, and both Arabs and non-Arabs take the role of an Arab. These portrayals often depict an ethnocentric perception of Arabs rather than an authentic and realistic depiction of Arabic cultures, religions, dialects, as well as customs and traditions. Common characteristics that are implemented in the role of Arab characters include speaking in a heavy accent, being hostile and vicious, and are in the context of terrorism. Key issues that have been explored in these portrayals include how Arabs are identified in mainstream Hollywood film, how Arabs self-represent themselves in their own film, with examples from Egyptian cinema, Palestinian cinema, as well as Syrian cinema. This article will also cover the emphasis on Islamophobia and its impacts on film. There has also been the portrayal of Arab women in film, the portrayal of Arabs post 9/11, the portrayal of Arabs in silent film, and positive portrayals and negative portrayals of Arabs. Lastly, the United States efforts to avoid the stereotyping of Muslims/Arabs and shifting the focus onto a positive outlook.

== Mainstream Hollywood films ==
Arab actors who have become stars in Hollywood include Omar Sharif, who has been described as "the first Egyptian and Arab to conquer Hollywood".

The 1999 film The 13th Warrior, starring Antonio Banderas as the Arab diplomat Ahmad ibn Fadlan, is credited with pioneering a Muslim hero in Hollywood blockbusters. The film has since cultivated a devoted cult following, particularly among Muslims. In addition, Aladdin (2019) starring Mena Massoud has been described as a more positive and vibrant portrayal of an Arab character.

Muslims and Arabs are often identified in mainstream Hollywood films in several negative connotations. Throughout the history of Hollywood, Arabs have been portrayed in many different racial stereotypes in both Western culture and film. Often portrayed as evil people, or rich oil sheikhs, and most infamously, terrorists after the September 11 attacks. In most forms of Western media, Arabs are portrayed in a negative light, often in stereotypical roles. Two films that have been accused of portraying Arabs as barbaric are Rules of Engagement (2000) and Death Before Dishonor (1987).

=== Rules of Engagement (2000) ===
This film was produced in cooperation with the US Marine Corps and the US Department of Defense. During its opening weekend, it reached number one at the box office, and grossed at roughly $15,000,000. Early in the movie, American marines defend the US Embassy in Southwest Asia against a crowd of Anti-American protesters who attacked with molotov cocktails and gunfire. With no choice, the main character, Colonel Childers, orders his men to open fire on the crowd in order to weed out the snipers hiding amongst them. The rest of the movie then focuses on the main character defending himself in court for his actions. Hussein Ibish, who is a spokesman for the American-Arab Anti Discrimination Committee, described this film as one of the most racist films that was ever produced about Arabs. The film itself received mixed reviews and a lukewarm box office. Due to the main plot, Arabic critics accused the film of anti-Arab racism, describing it as American propaganda.

=== Death Before Dishonor (1987) ===
In the film, US Marine Sergeant Jack Burns is sent on a mission to Israel. Fighting alongside Israelis and American marines, they defeat baby-murdering Palestinian terrorists as well as a German terrorist. In a scene in the film, a Palestinian terrorist asks a spying houseboy whether he would like to get back at the marines and that Allah would praise him for doing so. The boy nods in agreement and proceeds to blow up the US Embassy as well as himself. The scene then cuts to rumble everywhere, (the aftermath of the bombing incident), with a damaged US flag and a child's doll amongst the rumbles. The US Ambassador sighs and asks what sort of savages would do such a thing, then leave blood everywhere. He then observes a dead marine's corpse and comments on how his own mother wouldn't even recognize him. The New York Times critic, Janet Maslin, described the film as portraying Palestinians as terrorists that are "worthless, lying scum..."

== Arab self-representation in film ==
=== Religious identities in Arab film production: National and moral imaginaries ===
There are three main approaches in film that closely associate the larger Arab identity with just the Muslim Identity, disregarding other religions and beliefs in the Arab region. Some Arabic films address other religions and beliefs as part of the larger Arab identity, but the majority of Arab films still intertwine Muslim and Arab identity as being one, both implicitly as well as explicitly. The first approach is in how main historical Arab religious films have had a tendency to explicitly address religious identity through the telling of Islamic history, and, as such, convey a historically deep-rooted Muslim identity. The second approach is in how large numbers of dramas that get produced implicitly display religion. This is either displayed in the set's location (e.g. a mosque), or displayed through the character's behaviour (e.g. visiting a shrine or praying on a Muslim prayer mat). This approach displays the Muslim identity as being the moral compass used to address ethical as well as social aspects of everyday life. The third approach is in how a film gets to set parameters on how a Muslim is defined, whether a bad Muslim character or a good Muslim character. This is usually prone to stereotyping.

==== Picturing historical Islam ====
Ibrahim ‘Izz al-Din, director of the Egyptian film Zuhur al-Islam (1951), depicts life in the Arab Peninsula before the rise of Islam. The film was originally inspired by the historical novel Al-Wa’d Al-Haq (The True Promise, 1950), by Egyptian writer Taha Hussein, who tried to rewrite Islamic history. It depicted how the first Muslims struggled with their new belief, opposed by worshipers of other gods or religions. These first Muslims were tortured. However, despite that, they persisted and kept faithful to their newly acquired religion. Quite a number of similar films were produced, all depicting Islam to be victorious in its emergence during its early years. However, none of these films were historically accurate. These films symbolically represented the re-emergence of national identity after colonial rule, relating to mainly resurfaced views on morality. These films failed in accurately depicting the story of Islam's military victories, but rather, represented the moral restoration of people whose morals were repressed under colonialism. With the increase of the significance of Islam as being tied to Arab identity, the genre of the historical religious dramas gained increasing popularity with television shows, series, as well as film. This depiction of Muslims being victims of slander and colonialism whilst also being victorious, has become a popular character mold again after the events of 9/11, as Muslims had to suffer with stigmatization by the West.

==== Everyday realism with religious elements ====
The ‘everyday drama’ is one of the most popular genres in Arab cinema. Religion in films of this genre plays an implicit role in the setting, characters, actions, or symbols, which predominantly are identified as being Muslim, the religion of the protagonists and their society. Some of the images that feature in these films include images of mosques, as well as churches and synagogues, images of women wearing the hijab as well as images of women wearing the cross around their necks, images of saints, shrines, people praying, as well as secularists, atheists, fundamentalists, magic, religious violence, and the call to prayer. There are images of the Islamic pilgrimage (the Hajj), images of the holy Islamic feasting month of Ramadan, the two holy annual Islamic holy feats and Christmas. Therefore, religious values are portrayed as a natural part of daily life in these films, regardless of the fact that the film or its storyline is not directly about religion itself. Religious values in these everyday dramas are often portrayed as a social struggle against injustice rather than a religious one, which is embodied in the protagonist or hero, who represent the ideal human and moral way of behaving. The protagonist is exposed to injustice and opposes it in a civil manner, a manner that is rooted from tradition, morals, fairness, as well as other positive human values. In religious historical films, moral and ethical values which derive from Islamic tradition, are the natural answer to social injustice. This further emphasizes the inherent as well as natural behaviour or character of religious identity. This identity is further strengthened by visualizing Islamic tradition as being evident in so aspects of daily life. Two particular examples which are popularly used in depicting a Muslim identity in the everyday drama genre, is the call to prayer as well as the use of holy places and sites.

==== What makes a film "Arab"? ====
In an interview conducted by Jack Thomas Taylor, an assistant curator at The Media Majlis of Northwestern University in Qatar, with the film scholar and filmmaker Viola Shafik, she was asked what makes a film ‘Arab’. Her response argued that it was a controversial topic because the Arab region is vast and the term ‘Arab’ in itself could be interpreted from many different perspectives such as from a colonial perspective or an orientalist perspective. She also goes on by arguing that Pan-Arabism and Arab Nationalism are ideologies that were trying to unify all Arab states into one identity, disregarding the fact that the Arab region is a region of ethnic and linguistic diversity, religious diversity, as well as geographical and historical differences.

==== "Arab" and "Arabia" as makeshift terms ====
Shafik was also asked whether the term ‘Arab’ was sufficient to represent all aspects of the region's culture, as well as the ways in which that has influenced fictional ‘Arab’ character that has been so often stereotyped in film. Her response was that since she was a student of Oriental Studies in Germany, she was trained to observe the ‘Arab’ region from a psychological lens. Language was one aspect that was studied.

The Arabic language in itself was not enough to combine to group the region; therefore, the vernacular as well as colloquial cultures and differences had to be taken into consideration. Shafik also said that she gets offended at the terms ‘Arab’ and ‘Arabia’ as a nation, especially how Arabia has been popularly portrayed as this imaginary world from One Thousand and One Nights, a place which she claims she does not know of but apparently still exists in film. Shafik goes on by saying that the word ‘Arab’ was a word that was constructed, and understanding the definition of it as well as the definition of ‘othering’, is crucial in terms of understanding how this construction of this word was used as a tool to demonize, essentialize, as well as fetishize the other.

This process has spread its course over the region influencing this imaginary ‘Arabia’ as well as the character of the so-called Arab. This othering process is now inevitable and cannot reverse its impacts on the region, especially given the region's colonial history. In the years following decolonization as well as post-colonial era, stereotypes of Arabs in film started to emerge. One stereotype was that of the Arab being a terrorist, which essentially was a result of the Palestinian-Israeli conflict. Another stereotype was the Arab being the villains which was very much evident and popular in films produced in France as well as the United States, that date back as early as the 1920s and 1930s, and even more popular in the 1940s, especially during the rule of the French in Algeria where a strong resistance to the French was forming.

A direct consequence of the resistance that happened between these Arab colonies towards colonization, was the birth of vilifying the Arab and the Bedouin in western film, and the blood-thirst associated to these cultures, stereotypically. In western film, there have been some attempts in trying to politically correct this stereotype, however, these attempts have not been enough to completely deconstruct of dissect the othering of Arabs in film, especially in films produced by Hollywood.

=== Palestinian cinema ===
==== Divine Intervention (2002) ====
The film Divine Intervention is based on the lives of Palestinians under the Israeli occupation, and how their day-to-day lives are. The main character is played by the director of the film, Elia Suleiman. He does not speak throughout the film, which gives out the idea of how life under the Israeli occupation is draining him. Divine Intervention is shot in a comedic way that is also very powerful and effective. The shots are left without any dialogue to allow the viewer to analyze the scenes themselves. However, the film has some comedic scenes, such as one neighbor bickering about how the other neighbor leaves the trash in front of their house. Another scene is when a red balloon appears with Yasser Arafat's face on it. The balloon floats over the Israeli checkpoint, focusing on the faces of the Israeli soldiers and how they were contemplating about whether they should shoot the balloon down or not. They get so caught up with the balloon that they do not notice a car that goes by the checkpoint. The film also shows a love story between a Palestinian man and woman. The man lives in Jerusalem and the woman lives in Ramallah. In order for them to see one another, they would have to go through various checkpoints. Viewers are left to see them meeting in the car near one of the checkpoints, every time they wanted to see one another, which was the only was they would be able to spend time with each other.

According to The Guardian, Divine Intervention has been rejected by the Academy of Motion Picture for the category of Best Foreign Picture in the Oscars since they do not feel like Palestine is not a recognized or real nation. Another point The Guardian highlighted was that English was only spoken a twice in the film by a tourist that needed directions. They also tied this to another scene which was aimed towards showing how Israelis do not know anything, which is when the tourist asked for directions to the Church of Holy Sepulchre. The Israeli soldier did not know the directions so he got the blindfolded Palestinian man from the police car and told him to assist the tourist by giving her directions to the church. The Guardian also see the film as unrealistic and making certain scenes comedic by humiliating or belittling the Israeli soldiers, such as how they were distracted by the red balloon that had Yasser Arafat's image on it which made them not notice the car that was passing by the checkpoint.

=== Syrian cinema ===
==== The Day I Lost My Shadow (2018) ====
The Day I Lost My Shadow takes place in 2012, telling the story of a mother, Sana, who is raising her eight-year-old boy in Syria during the events of the war. In her attempt to get a gas cylinder, she meets a brother and sister who are also looking for a gas cylinder, and they end up taking a taxi to a city nearby to get it. They face many obstacles while they are trying to get the gas cylinders, but one thing Sana notices is how people lose their shadows once they have lost someone they love due to the war.

According to The Hollywood Reporter, Soudade Kaadan, the French-born Syrian director, won the Lion of the Future award at the Venice Film Festival for her remarkable work on the film. The story was told from a female voice, regarding the daily lives of Syrians during the war. The female voice perspective is what helped Soudade Kaadan in winning the award since it is rare that a female voice is able to deliver a message of power throughout a production.

=== Egyptian cinema ===
==== Cairo Station (1958) ====
Cairo Station was directed and produced by Egyptians for their own self-depiction, and the film had a fairly truthful and accurate depiction of Egyptian society at the time. Every major sector of society, every mindset, every community in Egypt, was represented. The film even represented a minority in society which were not commonly acknowledged or represented in film characters: the mentally ill, as well as the physically disabled. Cairo Station exhibited a character, Qinawi, who was both a cripple as well as a sexually frustrated pervert, whose obsession with a woman working at the station, Hanouma, spiralled out of control. Cairo Station is seen as the film that spread Youssef Chahine’s name on a global level. The stylistic movement that the film resembled the most was Italian neo-realism.

The film was shot from start to end at one single location; a train station in Cairo. It was a location where people from all around the country crossed at some point. Featured in the movie are urban Egyptians and rural Egyptians, conservative religious traditionalists as well as liberal westernized rock and roll musical groups of Egyptians, people from the upper most elite class of Egyptian society as well as people from the labor working class. Different dialects can also be heard amongst the Egyptians as well as different cultural dress wear and customs. The movie also shows Egypt's social hierarchy functioned, and how people from different social classes interacted with one another.

== Islamophobia and film ==
Islamophobia is the fear of the Islamic religion and the Muslim culture overall, which results in violent acts towards the Muslims due to the anxiety that others have from their religious acts.

After the incident of the Christchurch shooting, Rizwan Wadan, a camera technician, produced a short four-minute film called The Martyrs, which showcased three Islamophobic crimes that happened to Muslims in the past. This included a pregnant woman being kicked in the stomach, a stabbing, and an acid attack. The film was made with the intention of showing what Muslims and Arabs go through at times.

However, the film received a lot of controversy not only from non-Arabs and non-Muslims, but also by Muslims, mosques and the Tell MAMA organization, which monitors anti-Muslim hate crimes. Tell MAMA, mosques, and the people from the Muslim community asked for the film to be removed from all platforms and all film festivals as the film would create a greater fear within the Muslim community. It would make the Muslim community too afraid to go out, in fear of being put in the same situations that the short film had shown.

Fiyaz Mughal, the founder of Tell MAMA, criticized the film and asked that it be taken down as it might encourage violence against Muslims if the wrong person watches it. Wadan replied to all these controversies by stating that Muslims are always complaining about how they are being portrayed in a negative manner in films. His vision was for Muslims to start telling their own stories, which is what he did with The Martyrs. His aim of making this film was not to have people like it, but instead to make an impact and tell the stories of Muslims from the Muslim perspective, not from the Western perspective.

Wadan also argues that his film is not something that Muslims and others should be worried about since nowadays, with social media, people are watching videos of what has happened in the Christchurch shooting on their phones. Wadan stated that videos like those are what actually cause fear within the Muslim community and his film should not be removed.

== Portrayal of Arab women in film ==
Ever since the 1960s, Arab women have been portrayed in various ways in Hollywood films. They are usually portrayed either as the belly dancer, the oppressed woman or as maidens. These portrayals led the Westerners to view Arab women as only that. The very first portrayals of Arab women as a veiled belly dancer was in two silent black and white films, Fatima (1897) and Fatima’s Dance (1907). Both films starred the actress Fatima. Arab women are often also sexualized and objectified in terms of being maidens that are there to serve the need of the Arab sheikh. This is also portrayed in the remake of Around the World in Eighty Days (2004) by Disney, where the Arab sheikh had around a hundred wives and were objectified through the scenes of them doing nothing other than waiting for the time to serve the need of the sheikh.

=== Pretty Persuasion (2005) ===
In Pretty Persuasion, a young Palestinian woman who attends school in Beverly Hills, gets bullied for wearing a hijab, gets stereotypical comments thrown her way everyday and ends up killing herself.

=== Oil (1977) ===
In an attempt to get the oil prices down, a white male and his six colleagues visit a mythical Arab country and try to convince the sheikhs to lower the oil prices. During their stay in the Arab nation, they visit a restaurant in which they are entertained by belly dancers in a performance.

=== Abdullah the Great 1955) ===
Abdullah the Great portrays an Arab sheikh, Abdullah, and a European model, Ronnie. Ronnie is trying to bring down Abdullah's Arab monarch. Abdullah is always in the company of the Arab women that he bought, along with belly dancers. Even though Abdullah has all these women by his side, he still tries to seduce Ronnie, but Ronnie refuses. He then attempts to drug Ronnie in order to sleep with her, but he fails and gets dethroned. The only person that stands by his side is a belly dancer named Aziza.

== Portrayal of Arabs in film post-9/11 ==
After the event of 9/11, since then there are films about the war in the Middle East which emerge from Hollywood. Many of these movies deal with the ongoing war on terror, and such has their own portrayal of the Arab people.

=== The Kingdom (2007) ===
This movie talks about four FBI agents that fly off to Saudi Arabia, with only one mission, which is to find those responsible for the bombing of an American non-military facility.

Film critics have generally noted that The Kingdom has several good Arabic characters, which is considered different from several other films back then. Despite its nuanced portrayal of Arabs, there were several Arabic critics who took offense towards their portrayal, with one critic from the Guardian stating that the film 'perpetuates negative stereotypes for a quick buck and an adrenaline rush,'

=== Air Marshal (2003) ===
An Israeli film exploiting the 9/11 victims and showcasing Arab characters that have hijacked a jet and are killing passengers. They are then brought down by the U.S. Air Marshall that was on board.

=== The Stone Merchant (2006) ===
This film was seen as one of the most disturbing movies after the 9/11 incident. It showcases Arabs at an airport in Rome killing the passengers. It also shows how they made a bomb out of radioactive material and made it go off in Dover Harbor, killing the people that were on the ferry.

In an article by Variety, the portrayal of Arab Muslims is mentioned as objectionable in terms of the characters that were chosen to play the roles of the Arab Muslims. All Arab Muslims were depicted as dark skinned, violent and murderers. The article also mentions how one of the characters in the film is dedicated to showing his students how Islam and Muslims are a threat to Westerners and the Western culture. One of the scenes in the film is discussed where one of the characters mentions that Muslims are not all terrorists, but a large number of the terrorists are from the Muslim culture.

== Portrayal of Arabs in silent film ==
=== One Arabian Night (1920) ===
In this German silent film, a greedy sheikh is portrayed with his maidens. His favorite maiden runs off with a merchant. He asks his guards to get him a new maiden, which happens to be a Western dancer that was touring the country. The Western dancer is kidnapped to satisfy the sheikhs needs. The sheikh then kills her in fear of his son falling in love with the Western dancer, which is then followed by the killing of his son.

=== The Gift Girl (1917) ===
An orphaned girl is brought up in a country called Arabia, and is forced to marry a fat Arab merchant when she is all grown up. The girl then runs off to Paris and falls in love with a student there. The Arab merchant then shows up in Paris and tries to take his wife back to Arabia with him, but is fought off by the student and fails in taking his wife back with him.

=== The Lady of the Harem (1926) ===
An Arab sheikh loves women. He has his soldiers kidnap Pervanah, a blonde woman, for him. Pervanah's lover, Rafi, tries to get Pervanah back by going into the castle of the sheikh with expert dagger throwers and aims the dagger at the sheikhs back, killing him.

According to the synopsis by the American Film Institute, Pervanah was placed in a slave market, and Rafi had to make enough money for him to buy his lover back. The genre of the film is adventure whereas the sub-genre is Arabian.

== Negative portrayal of Arabs in film ==
Due to the events of 9/11 and what unfolds in the Middle East at that time, there were negative portrayals of Arabs during the war on terror. Some suggest that it might come off as propaganda. As such, there are Arabic characters in Western films that would come off as offensive towards the ethnic groups the movie portrays. These films often generalize that all Arabs are terrorists that are out to get people who are not Muslim and often also depict Islam as a violent and oppressive religion.

=== Promised Land (2004) ===
An Israeli film that portrays Arab sex slavers and shows them trading and selling Eastern European women.

=== American Dreamz (2006) ===
A musical/comedy that shows terrorists from Al-Qaeda trying to blow up the United States president. Even though a musical/comedy is usually seen in a positive light, here it is negative in terms of how they depict Arabs.

The film had various aspects that included influencing teens to go after their dreams, as well as highlighting the entertainment industry and certain political issues. The film received more negative criticism than positive appraisals.

=== 13 Hours: The Secret Soldiers of Benghazi (2016) ===
A movie that is based on the events that happened in Benghazi, Libya on September 11, 2012, where the American Ambassador was assassinated along with an officer from the Foreign Services of the United States. The movie shows how six men that were already on the soils of Benghazi were able to fight back and save themselves and the other Americans that were there from militants. The movie portrayed Libyan militants threatening the US embassy and were the antagonists of the movie. Although the movie also showed sympathetic portrayals of Arabs, via Libyan civilians caught in the crossfire, and several friendly militants fighting with the marines. 13 Hours was considered to be relatively accurate, despite being criticized for being too bombastic or 'myopic'. The film caused some controversy in Libya, with spokesperson Salah Belnaba denouncing the portrayal of the Libyan people and described it as 'fanatical and ignorant'. The Guardian had also criticized the movie.

=== Angelique and the Sultan (1968) ===
France has released a sequence of five Angelique films, all based on the author Anne Golan’s novels. This film is the fifth film. This film displays disturbingly familiar and ugly stereotypes of Arabs. In the opening scene of the film, we see the sheikh's men, portrayed as lecherous Arabs, kidnapping Angelique and enslaving her. Furthermore, while Angelique is held hostage at the ruler's palace, two Arab Harem maidens try to knife her in her sleep. In the palace dungeon, Angelique gets whipped and branded by the sheikh's men because she threatened to commit suicide rather than have Arab men ravish her. The sheikh's men capture other European protagonists who are chained and tortured, etc.

== Positive portrayal of Arabs in film ==
Some Hollywood films that have portrayed Arabs in a more positive light:

=== The 13th Warrior (1998) ===
Starring Antonio Banderas as the lead, he plays the role of Ahmad Ibn Fadlan, an exiled Arabic Ambassador from his homeland and shows his journey as he meets a group of twelve Vikings. He faces some cultural differences with them, but the Vikings then face a mission in which they would need a total of thirteen soldiers. With them only being twelve, Ahmad joins them and helps them in overcoming the mission successfully, which depicts the Arab character as a hero.

=== Raising Arizona (1987) ===
The film shows a scene where unexpected guests show up, and the male protagonist mentions that Arabs welcome the expected guests and the unexpected guests at any time. This shows how Arabs are hospitable.

=== Flightplan (2005) ===
Set on a flight to New York, the female protagonist Jodie Foster's 6-year-old daughter disappears. Foster starts looking around and points at the dark-skinned Arab passenger accusing him to kidnapping her daughter. She later on finds her daughter, who has been kidnapped by a non-Arab passenger. The closing scene of the film is of the Arab passenger that was accused of kidnapping Foster's daughter, giving her one of her bags that she had left behind.

=== Ali: Fear Eats the Soul (1974) ===
This film deals with discrimination against interracial couples: more specifically in this case, discrimination against an Arab and a German who fall in love with each other. Set in post-war Germany, in the city of Munich, the protagonist is a handsome Moroccan mechanic who experiences prejudice as well as his German partner. People all around the city mock the couple, from waiters to cleaning ladies to apartment dwellers to shopkeepers. In the film, Ali begins opening up to Emma, his lover, a German widow in her 50s, and begins to admit to how he genuinely feels like Arabs are not considered actual people in Germany, but more like street dogs. He's been mistreated by the Germans and how they made him feel inhumane. We also see how Emma's own children get outraged upon the discovery of their mother being married to an Arab, when he has been nothing but a gentleman to her. Towards the end of the film, in the last few frames, we see the couple happy side by side, and that prejudices may perhaps have been learnt.

=== Battle of the Algiers (1966) ===
This film has provided viewers with much needed insights into the controversial of terrorism, more specifically in this film, the contrast between how Algerian civilians and the French military used different “terror” weapons or tools in order to achieve their goals. The film was shot in the locations where the battles took place, and on exactly the same streets even. The costumes of the “Algiers” characters looked authentic. A crucial scene in the film, which perfectly illustrates the war on terror, is when an Algerian rebel gets asked by a French journalist whether he thinks it is cowardly for Algerians to send off their women carrying bombs in their handbags to blow-up French civilians. The Algerian rebel replies by asking the French journalist whether it is not cowardly to blow up Algerian civilians with napalm. Therefore, if the French want the Algerians to surrender their women carrying handbags, the Algerians should have the French airplanes in exchange for them.

=== Madame Rosa (1977) ===
This film is set in Paris, France, and revolves around the relationship between an Arab Muslim boy and his beloved friend, an elderly Jewish woman, Rosa. She is a Jewish survivor of Nazi concentration camps, and she babysits the children of some prostitutes to earn some money, and the Arab Muslim boy, an 11-year of Algerian boy named Mohammed, happens to be one of them, and he is by far her favorite. Rosa decides to enroll Mohammed into school as a favor, but officials refused to admit him since he does not hold an official birth certificate, as well as him being an Arab, who were considered as outsiders or outcasts in France at the time. Therefore, he was unfortunately not eligible to enroll at any educational institute in France.

== Efforts by the United States ==
One of the efforts that Americans are taking towards Arabs and the racial stereotypes that are associated with Arabs and Muslims is the American-Arab Anti-Discrimination Committee. The committee aims to protect the civil rights of Arabs, but also playing a major role tackling discrimination against Arabs and the stereotypes as well. This goes in hand with them speaking up when films go overboard with the racial stereotyping of Arabs that may lead to the harm of any Arab or Muslim.

24 (2007)

There has been the implementation of representational strategies in American television and films; these attempts to challenge Arabs and Muslims negative stereotypes as terrorists. These strategies are evident in the drama television show 24. One of the representational strategies used is showcasing America as a multicultural entity, in which it is culturally diverse.

Moreover, writers and producers also humanize the Arab/Muslim characters, rather than presenting them as vicious. Within the show, it is evident that the family conducts normal family activities such as having breakfast all together in the morning while watching television. This representation strategy gives them more humane characteristics and presents them as a typical family.

Another strategy used is flipping the enemy. This strategy leads the viewer to raise suspicion of the Muslim/Arab character to be a part of terrorist activities. Still, it reveals towards the end that the Muslim character is innocent. Instead, present the Euro-American character link back to these acts, despite being the least suspected of terrorism.

These are three of the various representational strategies employed by television show "24". These representational strategies have attempted to overturn the stereotypical perception of Muslims/Arabs in American television series and films.
