= Louis Henri Boussenard =

French author (1847–1910)

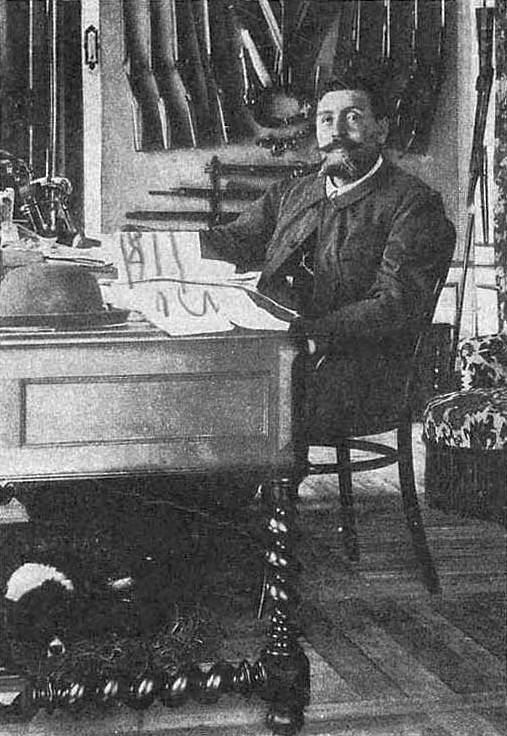
Louis Henri Boussenard

Louis Henri Boussenard (4 October 1847, Escrennes, Loiret – 11 September 1910 in Orléans) was a French author of adventure novels, dubbed "the French Rider Haggard" during his lifetime, but known better presently in Eastern Europe than in Francophone countries. As a measure of his popularity, 40 volumes of his collected works were published in Imperial Russia during 1911.

A physician by profession, Boussenard travelled throughout the French colonies, especially in Africa. He was drafted during the Franco-Prussian War but soon capitulated to the Prussian soldiers, an experience that could explain a nationalist theme present in many of his novels. Some of his books demonstrate a certain disdain of Britons and Americans, a fact which likely contributed to his obscurity and lack of translations in the English-speaking countries.

The author's picaresque humour flourished in his earliest books, À travers Australie: Les dix millions de l'Opossum rouge (1879), Le tour du monde d'un gamin de Paris (1880), Les Robinsons de la Guyane (1882), Aventures périlleuses de trois Français au pays des diamants (1884, set in a mysterious cavern underneath the Victoria Falls), The Crusoes of Guyana; or, The White Tiger (1885), and Les étrangleurs du Bengale (1901).

Boussenard's best-known book Le Capitaine Casse-Cou (1901) was set at the time of the Second Boer War. L'île en feu (1898) fictionalized Cuba's struggle for independence. Aspiring to emulate Jules Verne, Boussenard also produced several science fiction novels, notably Les secrets de monsieur Synthèse (1888) and Dix mille ans dans un bloc de glace (1890), both translated by Brian Stableford in 2013 with the title Monsieur Synthesis ISBN 978-1-61227-161-3
