= The Son of the Sheik =

1926 film by George Fitzmaurice

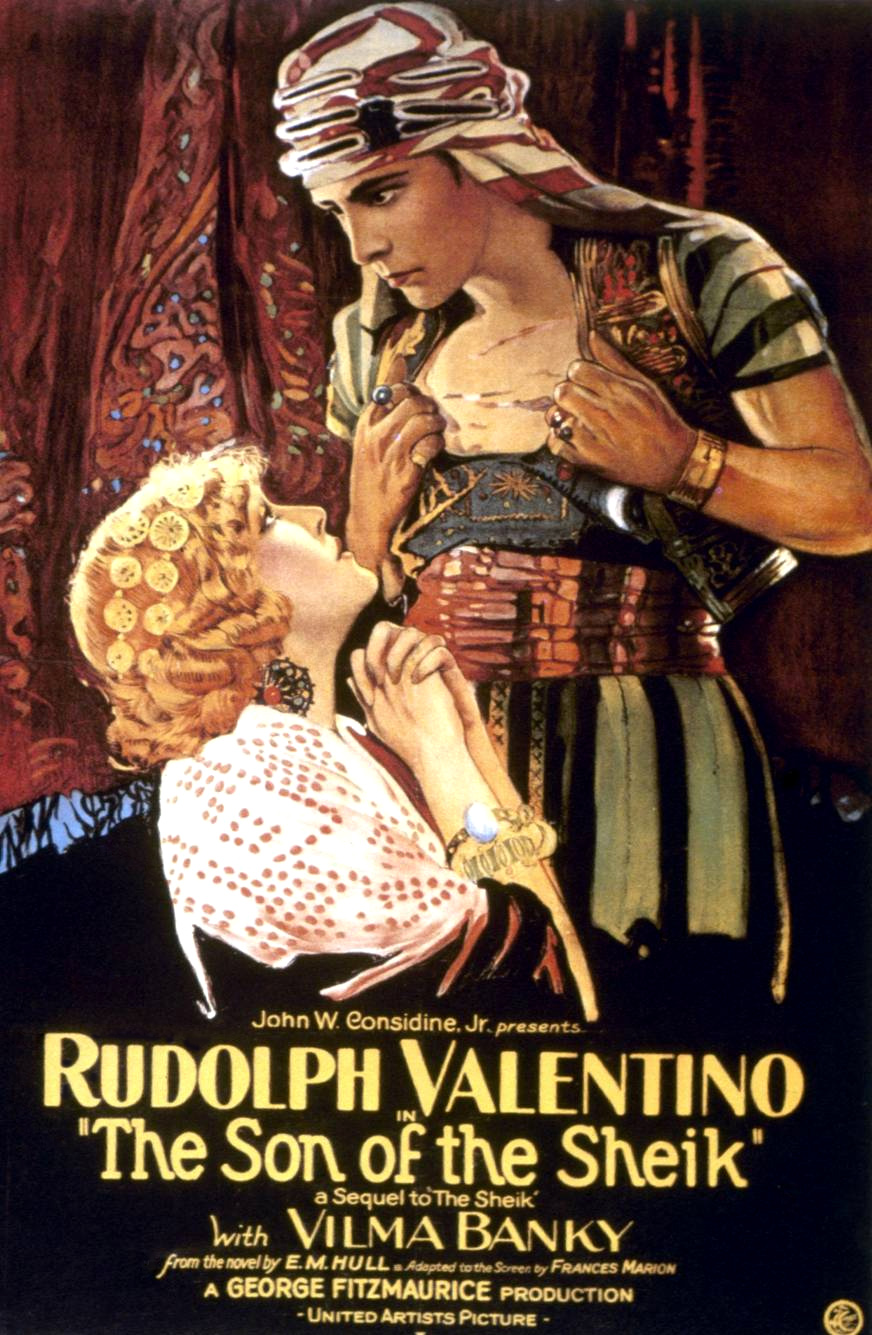
- Film poster
- Directed by: George Fitzmaurice
- Written by: Frances Marion (adaptation); Fred de Gresac (adaptation); George Marion Jr. (titles); Paul Gerard Smith (uncredited)
- Based on: The Sons of the Sheik by Edith Hull
- Produced by: George Fitzmaurice; John W. Considine Jr. (uncredited)
- Starring: Rudolph Valentino; Vilma Bánky; Montagu Love; Karl Dane; George Fawcett
- Cinematography: George Barnes
- Music by: Artur Guttmann (1937); Jack Ward (1969); Alloy Orchestra (2014)
- Production company: Feature Productions
- Distributed by: United Artists
- Release date: July 9, 1926
- Running time: 80 min.
- Country: United States
- Language: Silent (English intertitles)
- Box office: over $2 million

The Son of the Sheik is a 1926 American silent adventure drama film directed by George Fitzmaurice and starring Rudolph Valentino and Vilma Bánky. The film is based on the 1925 romance novel The Sons of the Sheik by Edith Maude Hull, and is a sequel to the 1921 hit film The Sheik, which also stars Rudolph Valentino. The Son of the Sheik is Valentino's final film and went into general release nearly two weeks after his death from peritonitis at the age of 31.

In 2003, the film was selected for preservation in the United States National Film Registry by the Library of Congress as being "culturally, historically, or aesthetically significant". On January 1, 2022, the film went into the public domain after years of being in copyright due to the Copyright Term Extension Act.

== Plot ==
The Son of the Sheik (1926)

In his final film performance before his death in 1926, Rudolph Valentino tackles two roles, as a father and his son. Ahmed, the son of an Arab sheik and a kidnapped English gentlewoman, loves local dancing girl Yasmin. When he slips out of his father's heavily guarded compound to woo her, he is kidnapped and held for ransom by a group of bandits led by Yasmin's father and Ghabah, the Moor to whom she is betrothed.

== Cast ==
- Rudolph Valentino as Ahmed, The Son / The Sheik, Ahmed's Father
- Vilma Bánky as Yasmin
- George Fawcett as Andre
- Montagu Love as Ghabah
- Karl Dane as Ramadan
- Bull Montana as Ali The Mountebank
- Bynunsky Hyman as Pincher The Mountebank
- Agnes Ayres as Diana, The Sheik's Wife, Ahmed's Mother
- Erwin Connelly as Zouave (uncredited)

== Production ==
At the time of the film's release, Rudolph Valentino was attempting to make a comeback in films. He rose to international stardom after the release of The Four Horsemen of the Apocalypse and The Sheik in 1921, both of which were box-office hits and solidified his image as "the Great Lover". By 1924, however, Valentino's popularity had begun to wane after he appeared in two box office failures, Monsieur Beaucaire and A Sainted Devil, both of which featured him in roles that were a departure from his "Great Lover" image. He also squabbled over money with Famous Players–Lasky, the studio he was signed to, which eventually led to him walking out on his contract. Famous Players–Lasky eventually released Valentino from his contract and he signed with United Artists in 1925.

In an effort to capitalize on the success that Valentino had achieved with The Sheik, United Artists' president Joseph M. Schenck bought the rights to Edith Maude Hull's novel Son of the Sheik and cast Valentino in the dual role of father and son.

Valentino was paid $100,000. The director was paid $75,000 and Frances Marion $25,000.

The novel was adapted for the screen by Frances Marion and Fred de Gresac. The film was shot on location in California and in the Yuma Desert in Arizona.

== Reception ==
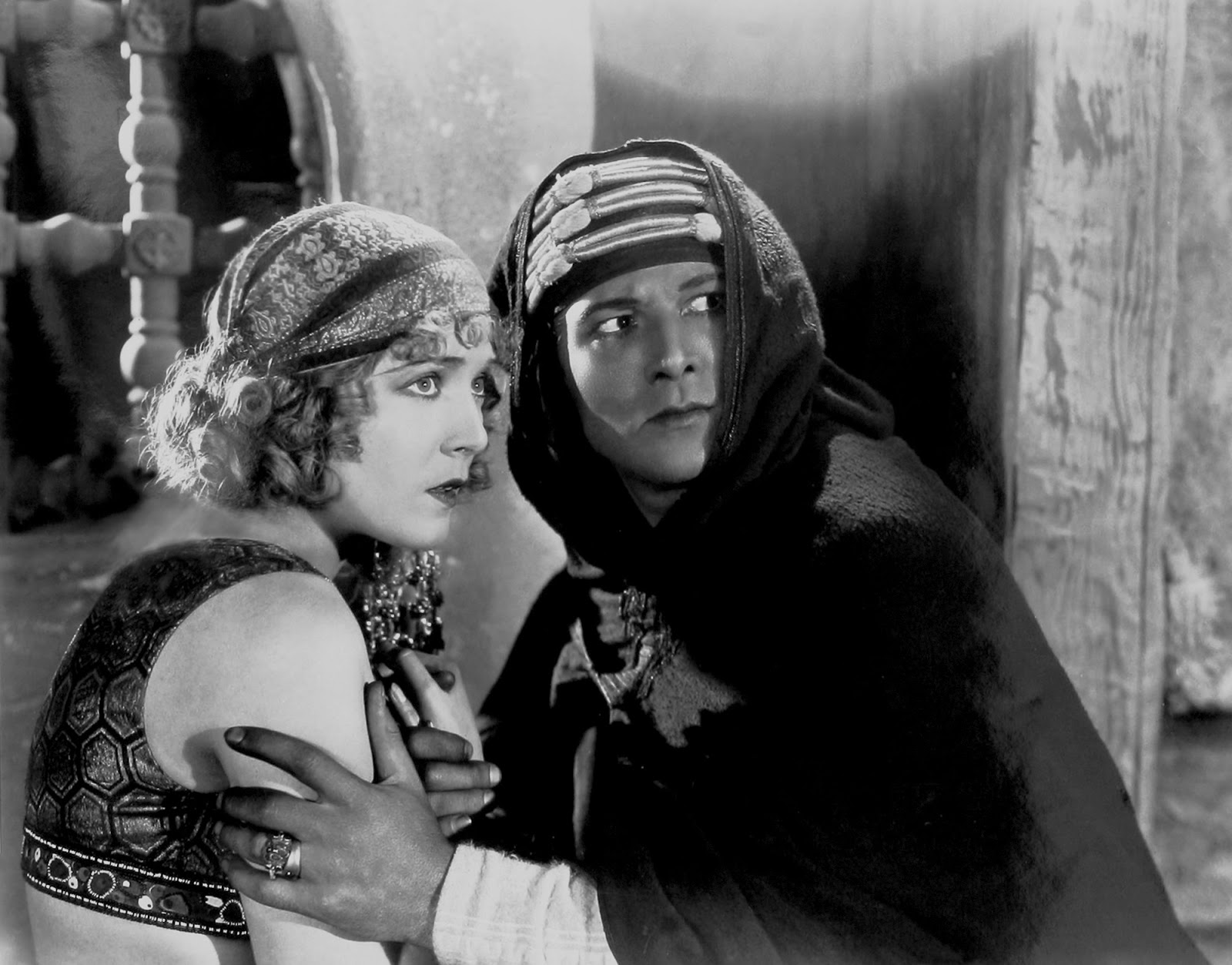
Photo still of Vilma Bánky and Rudolph Valentino in The Son of the Sheik

=== Box office ===
The Son of the Sheik opened at the Million Dollar Theater in Los Angeles on July 9, 1926 and played for four weeks.

Valentino then embarked on a nationwide tour to promote the film as it rolled out around the first run theatres in the country's cities. On August 15, he collapsed in his New York City hotel room and was rushed to the hospital. Doctors discovered he had a perforated ulcer which required emergency surgery. After the surgery, Valentino developed peritonitis and died on August 23, 1926.

The Son of the Sheik was put into general release nationwide on September 5, 1926, nearly two weeks after Valentino's death. The film grossed $1,000,000 worldwide within the first year of its release. Eventually it more than doubled that.

=== Critical ===
Some critics consider Valentino's performance in the film as one of the best of his career.

== Home media ==
Image Entertainment released The Son of the Sheik along with The Sheik on DVD in 2002.

== See also ==
- 1926 in film
