= E. M. Hull =

British writer

Edith Maud Hull
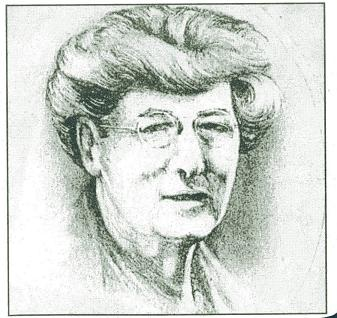
- An anonymous sketch
- Born: Edith Maud Henderson; 16 August 1880; London, England
- Died: 11 February 1947 (aged 66); Hazlewood, Derbyshire, England
- Occupation: Novelist
- Spouse: Percy Winstanley Hull
- Children: Cecil Winstanley Hull
- Writing career
- Pen name: E. M. Hull, Edith M. Hull, Edith Maud Winstanley
- Language: English
- Period: 1919–1939
- Genre: Romance fiction
- Notable work: The Sheik

Edith Maud Hull (16 August 1880 – 11 February 1947) was a British writer of romance novels, typically credited as E. M. Hull.

She is best known for The Sheik, which became an international best-seller in 1921. The Sheik is credited with beginning a revival of the "desert romance" genre of romantic fiction. Hull followed The Sheik with several other novels with desert settings, such as The Shadow of the East, The Desert Healer, and The Sons of the Sheik.

== Personal life ==
Born Edith Maud Henderson on 16 August 1880 in the Borough of Hampstead, London, England, she was the daughter of James Henderson, a Liverpool shipowner originally from New York City, and Katie Thorne, of New Brunswick, Canada. As a child she travelled widely with her parents, even visiting Algeria, the setting of her novels.

In 1899, she married Percy Winstanley Hull (b. 1869), a civil engineer and later a prize-winning pig farmer. The couple relocated to the Hull family estate in Derbyshire during the early 1900s. They had a daughter, Cecil Winstanley Hull.

Hull was somewhat reclusive and did not seek publicity. She died at age 66, on 11 February 1947 in Hazelwood, in the parish of Duffield, Derbyshire.

== Writing career ==
Hull wrote fiction while her husband was away serving in World War I. The Sheik, her first effort, was published in England in 1919 and to her surprise quickly became an international bestseller, scoring among Publishers Weekly's ten best sellers in America for both of the years 1921 and 1922. Hull's volume quickly sold more than 1.2 million copies worldwide. Sales further increased when Paramount released a film version of The Sheik during 1921, which greatly increased the fame of the main actor, Rudolph Valentino. By 1923, the novel had more than a hundred editions, and sales had surpassed all other Best-Sellers combined. Hull's novel was not the first desert romance— the genre had been initiated mainly by writers like Robert Smythe Hichens and Kathlyn Rhodes— but it was the most popular and influential on later romance writers.

Hull continued to write into the 1930s, and her 1925 novel The Sons of the Sheik was also a tremendous success, as was the film version Son of the Sheik, which again featured Valentino in what was to be his last film.

During her later life, Hull expressed regret that she had sold the film rights for her novels for too little money.

During the 1940s, Canadian science fiction writer Edna Mayne Hull initially published her work as "E.M. Hull", before switching to the credited name E. Mayne Hull to avoid confusion. The two writers are not related.

== Bibliography ==
=== The Sheik saga ===
1. The Sheik, 1919
2. The Sons of the Sheik, 1925

=== Single novels ===
- The Shadow of the East, 1921; adapted into the 1924 film The Shadow of the Desert. Considered a lost film.
- The Desert Healer, 1923; adapted into the 1926 film Old Loves and New. Considered a lost film.
- The Lion-Tamer, 1928
- The Captive of the Sahara, 1931
- The Forest of Terrible Things, 1939 (title in US: Jungle Captive)

=== Travel memoir ===
- Camping in the Sahara, 1926 (with photographs by Hull's daughter Cecil)

== See also ==
- Robert S. Hichens
- Elinor Glyn
