= Jack Shaheen =

American media scholar and journalist (1935–2017)

- Born: Jack George Shaheen Jr. September 21, 1935; Pittsburgh, Pennsylvania, U.S.
- Died: July 9, 2017 (aged 81); Charleston, South Carolina, U.S.
- Notable work: Reel Bad Arabs

Jack George Shaheen Jr. (Arabic: جاك جورج شاهين; September 21, 1935 – July 9, 2017) was an American writer and lecturer specializing in addressing racial and ethnic stereotypes. He authored Reel Bad Arabs (adapted to a 2006 documentary), The TV Arab (1984) and Arab and Muslim Stereotyping in American Popular Culture (1997).

== Early life and education ==
Shaheen was born in Pittsburgh to Lebanese Christian immigrants, and grew up in Clairton, Pennsylvania.

Shaheen graduated from Clairton High School in 1953. In 1957, he graduated from Carnegie Institute of Technology with a Bachelor of Fine Arts. In 1964, he received a master's degree from Pennsylvania State University. In 1969, Shaheen received a PhD from the University of Missouri.

== Career ==
Shaheen's work focused on racism and orientalism, particularly in popular culture such as Hollywood films. He delivered over 1,000 lectures on the issue across the United States and on three continents. He described his life's work in 2015, to Tavis Smiley, as "dedicated to trying to humanize Arabs and Muslims and to give visibility to American Arabs and American Muslims — to have us being projected no better, no worse, than anyone else."

Shaheen was also a former CBS News consultant on Middle East affairs, U.S. Army veteran, and professor emeritus of Mass Communications at Southern Illinois University at Edwardsville.

Shaheen's seminal "Jack Shaheen versus the Comic Book Arab" (1991) has been cited by a multitude of scholars.

== Honors ==
Shaheen received two Fulbright teaching awards He was also the distinguished visiting scholar at New York University's Hagop Kevorkian Center for Near Eastern Studies.

== Personal life ==
Shaheen was a fan of the Pittsburgh Steelers, often walked along the beaches of Hilton Head Island and was a former member of the Hilton Head Orchestra board of directors. He also attended, as one obituary describes, "services at Holy Resurrection Greek Orthodox Church in Bluffton. He married Bernice Rafeedie, a Palestinian-American, in 1966 and had two children, Michael and Michelle, along with several grandchildren.

== Death ==
Shaheen died on July 9, 2017, at the age of 81. People who praised his work include Ralph Nader, who said that Shaheen "provided the incriminating evidence directly from the biased media, unedited", and Ali Mirsepassi, director of New York University's Iranian Studies Initiative, wrote in 2012 that "Jack Shaheen approaches his critical work with little personal or intellectual bitterness, moral arrogance or intellectual superiority."

== Works and publications ==
- Shaheen, Jack G. (1979). Nuclear War Films. Carbondale: Southern Illinois University Press. ISBN 0-8093-0843-6. OCLC 317396635.
- Shaheen, Jack G. (1984). The TV Arab. Bowling Green, Ohio: Popular Press. ISBN 0-87972-309-2. OCLC 581867731.
- Shaheen, Jack G. (2012). Reel Bad Arabs: How Hollywood Vilifies a People (Revised and updated ed.). New York: Olive Branch Press, Interlink Publishing Group. ISBN 978-1-62371-006-4. OCLC 928572276. – originally published in 2001
- Shaheen, Jack G. (2012). Guilty: Hollywood's Verdict on Arabs After 9/11. Northampton, MA: Olive Branch Press, Interlink Publishing Group. ISBN 978-1-62371-020-0. OCLC 828794510.
