= The Sheik (film) =

1921 film by George Melford

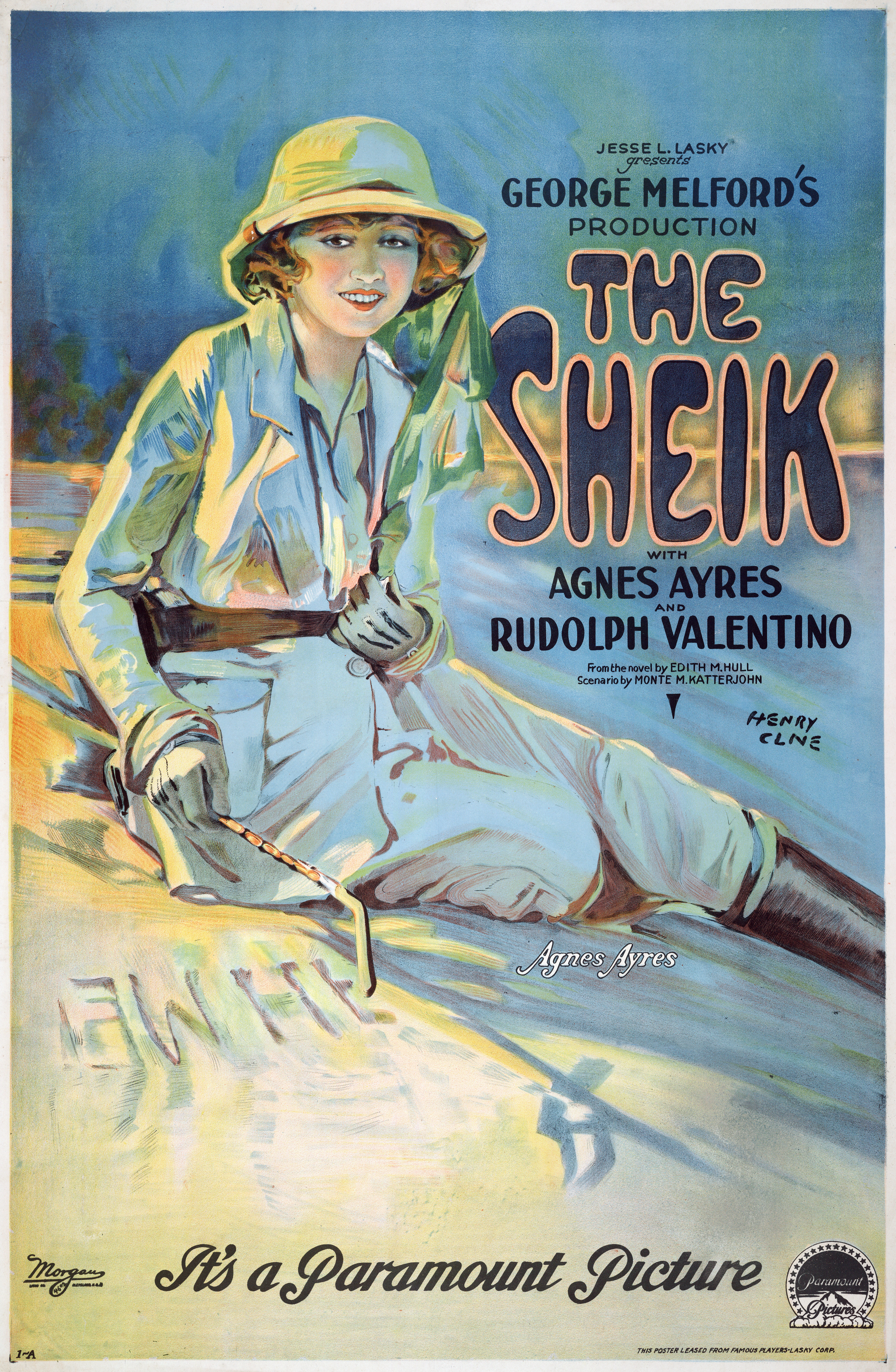
- Directed by: George Melford
- Written by: Monte M. Katterjohn (adaptation)
- Based on: The Sheik by Edith Maude Hull
- Produced by: Fred Quimby
- Starring: Rudolph Valentino; Agnes Ayres
- Cinematography: William Marshall
- Music by: Irving Berlin (1970s reissue); Ben Model (2017 Kino Lorber reissue)
- Production company: Famous Players–Lasky
- Distributed by: Paramount Pictures
- Release date: November 20, 1921 (US)
- Running time: 80 minutes
- Country: United States
- Language: Silent (English intertitles)
- Budget: under $200,000
- Box office: $1.5 million (US/Canada)

The Sheik is a 1921 American silent romantic drama film produced by Famous Players–Lasky, directed by George Melford, starring Rudolph Valentino and Agnes Ayres, and featuring Adolphe Menjou. It was based on the bestselling 1919 romance novel of the same name by Edith Maude Hull and was adapted for the screen by Monte M. Katterjohn. The film was a box-office hit and helped propel Valentino to stardom.

In the 1926 sequel The Son of the Sheik, Valentino played both the Sheik and his son, while Ayres reprised her role. A third film in the series, She's a Sheik, was produced in 1927 by Paramount and starred Bebe Daniels in a comedic role reversal of the original film.

== Plot ==
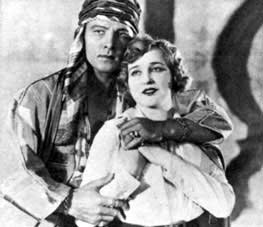
Rudolph Valentino as Sheik Ahmed and Agnes Ayres as Lady Diana.

In the North Africa town of Biskra, headstrong Lady Diana Mayo refuses a marriage proposal because she believes it would be the end of her independence. Against her brother's wishes, she is planning a month-long trip into the desert, escorted only by natives.

When Diana goes to the local casino, she is informed it has been appropriated for the evening by an important sheik, and that none but Arabs may enter. Annoyed at being told what she cannot do, and her curiosity piqued, Diana borrows an Arab dancer's costume and sneaks in. Inside, she finds men gambling for new wives. When she is selected to be the next prize, she resists. Sheik Ahmed Ben Hassan intervenes, then realizes she is white. Amused, he sends her away. Afterward, Mustapha Ali informs the Sheik she is the woman he has been hired to guide tomorrow. The Sheik hatches a plan. Early the next morning, he sneaks into her room and tampers with the bullets in her revolver as she is sleeping.

As her brother leaves her to her desert excursion, she assures him he will see her in London next month. The Sheik and his men come upon Diana riding alone. She tries to flee while shooting at the Sheik, but he easily captures her. Back at his encampment, he orders her about. She is unused to such treatment, but the Sheik tells her she will learn and demands she dress like a woman (she is wearing trousers) for dinner.

Diana tries again to escape, this time into a raging sand storm. The Sheik saves her from certain death, and tells her she will learn to love him. Later, he finds Diana alone in her quarters weeping. The Sheik considers forcing himself upon her, but decides against it and calls for a serving girl, Zilah. Zilah offers her a hug. Diana accepts, and pours out her tears in Zilah's arms.

Diana is allowed to go into the desert under the watchful eye of the Sheik's French valet Gaston. She escapes. Making her way across the sands, she spots a caravan, unaware that it belongs to the bandit Omair. The Sheik and his men reach her first.

After a week, the Sheik is delighted by the news that his close friend from his days in Paris, where he was educated, is coming for a visit. Diana is dismayed at the thought of being seen in Arab dress by a Westerner, but the Sheik does not understand her shame. He does, however, return her gowns before his friend comes so she can wear them to dinner. When she is introduced to writer and doctor Raoul St. Hubert, Diana's spirit is nearly broken. He befriends her and reprimands the Sheik for his callous treatment of her. The Sheik returns her Western clothing, though he refuses to release her.

When Raoul is called away to tend to an injured man, Diana shows concern that it might be the Sheik. Seeing this from hiding, the Sheik is elated that she may be warming up to him at last. He gives Diana her gun back, telling her he trusts her.

The Sheik reveals to Raoul he is in love with Diana; his friend convinces him to let her go. Meanwhile, Diana is allowed out once more. She playfully writes "I love you Ahmed" in the sand. Then Omair's band captures her, killing her guards and leaving the wounded Gaston for dead.

When the Sheik goes looking for Diana, he sees her message, then learns from Gaston who has abducted her. He gathers his men to attack Omair's stronghold. Omair tries to force himself on Diana, but is almost stabbed by one of his women. Then the Sheik and his men sweep in. After a long fight, the Sheik kills Omair, but is himself gravely injured.

Raoul tends to him and tells Diana he has a chance. She sits and holds the Sheik's hand. When she remarks that his hand is big for an Arab, Raoul reveals that the Sheik is not one. His father was British and his mother Spanish. They died in the desert, and their child was rescued and raised by the old Sheik; when the old man died, Ahmed returned to rule the tribe. When Ahmed wakes up, Diana confesses her love.

The Sheik (1921) by George Melford

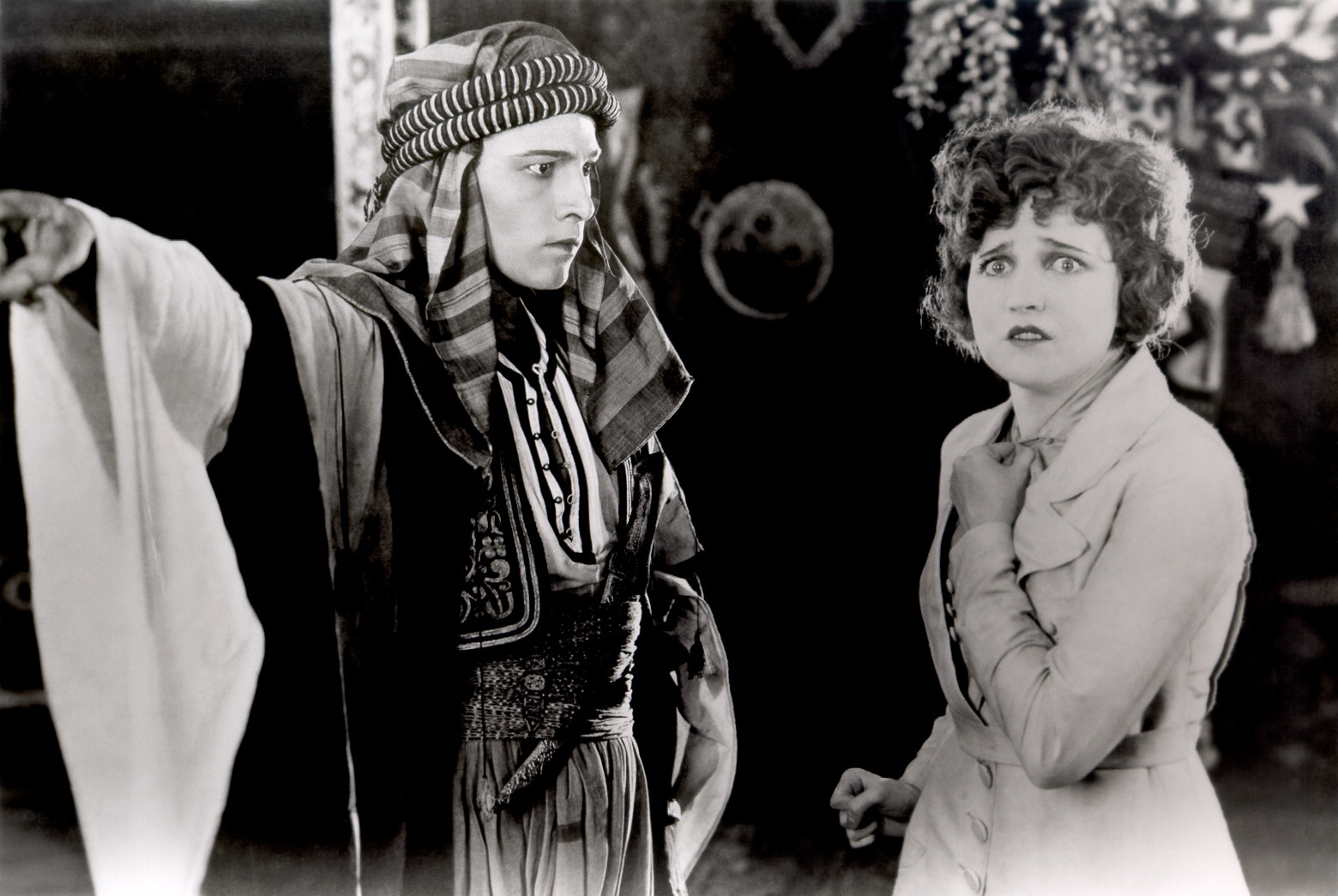
The Sheik commands his new captive to obey him.

== Cast ==
- Rudolph Valentino as Sheik Ahmed Ben Hassan
- Agnes Ayres as Lady Diana Mayo
- Ruth Miller as Zilah, the serving girl
- George Waggner as Yousaef, a tribal chieftain
- Frank Butler as Sir Aubrey Mayo, Diana's brother
- Charles Brinley as Mustapha Ali
- Lucien Littlefield as Gaston
- Adolphe Menjou as Raoul de Saint Hubert
- Walter Long as Omair
- Loretta Young as Arab child (uncredited)
- Polly Ann Young (uncredited)

== Production ==
The film was based on Edith Maude Hull's best selling novel The Sheik. The novel became a best seller partly because of its controversial dealings with racial miscegenation and rape. Due to the controversial subject matter, certain aspects of the novel were left out of the film. In the novel, Sheik Ahmed rapes Lady Diana. George Melford said, "We have handled the frank scenes in 'The Sheik' so delicately that I think the censors will be the only disappointed reviewers."

There appears to be some dispute as to where the film was shot. Emily W. Leider, author of Dark Lover: The Life and Death of Rudolph Valentino, argues that the desert exterior scenes were filmed in Oxnard, California, and the Guadalupe Dunes of Santa Barbara County. However, one 1983 newspaper article featured in the Suffolk County News contends that exteriors scenes were shot at the "Walking Dunes" in Montauk, New York and at the Kaufman Astoria Studios. Author Richard Koszarski claims that this is incorrect and cites it as an "urban legend". Another source says filming was done in the desert near Palm Springs, California.

James Kirkwood, Sr. was George Melford's original choice for the starring role of Sheik Ahmed Ben Hassan.

== Reception ==
The Sheik was released nationwide on November 20, 1921 after its premiere in Los Angeles on October 30, 1921 and in New York on November 6. Critical reception was mixed, as some critics felt that it was a mistake to leave out the rape of Lady Diana by Sheik Ahmed as it altered the original message of the novel. Some critics felt that the "toned-down" film version would not be well received; however, the film was a major success with audiences, and set new attendance records where it premiered. In its first week of release, it set attendance records at two of New York's major theaters, the Rialto and the Rivoli. The New York Telegraph estimated that in the first few weeks 125,000 people had seen the film.

Due to the film's success, Jesse Lasky declared the last week of November 1921 as "The Sheik Week", and screened the film at 250 theatres in the United States on November 20, 1921. The film ran for six months in Sydney, Australia, as well as 42 weeks in one theatre in France. It was the first Valentino film to show in his native Italy.

Within the first year of its release, The Sheik exceeded $1 million in ticket sales (the film was made for under $200,000). The Sheik helped to solidify Valentino's image as one of the first male sex symbols of the screen and made him an international star. While he was a popular draw with female audiences, some male audiences mocked his onscreen persona and questioned his masculinity. Valentino would later attempt to portray roles that went against his "Sheik" image with limited success. His final film was the sequel The Son of the Sheik, which premiered nationwide after his death in August 1926.

A reviewer for Photoplay described it as "Popular entertainment—that and nothing more. But that is enough."

The review aggregator website Rotten Tomatoes reported that 88% of critics have given the film a positive review based on 8 reviews, with an average rating of 7.33/10.

=== Broadway adaptation ===
The film along with The Thief of Bagdad (1924) was adapted into a broadway by Dardanella which was performed on October 12, 1928, in Surabaya, and starred Indonesian actor Tan Tjeng Bok which later earned him the nickname "Douglas Fairbanks of Java". Future American dancer, Devi Dja, also appeared in the broadway by working behind the stage.

=== Proposed remake ===
Film rights were bought by Edward Small who recreated segments of The Sheik in the biographical picture Valentino (1951), starring Anthony Dexter, who Small announced would star in a remake of The Sheik, but which was never made. Harum Scarum (1965), which starred Elvis Presley, was inspired by the film.

== Home media ==
The Sheik has been released on Region 1 DVD by several companies over the years, including Image Entertainment in 2002. In 2004, Instant Vision released the film on Region 2 DVD. In commemoration of its 100th anniversary, Paramount Home Entertainment released the film on Blu-ray on October 19, 2021.

== In popular culture ==
- The Sheik became so popular that the word came to be used to mean a young man on the prowl. The object of a Sheik's desire was dubbed "a Sheba".
- The Sheik became widely copied over the years. Burning Sands, Tents of Allah, Felix the Cat Shatters the Sheik, and Rex Ingram's The Arab, which starred Ramón Novarro. The Shriek of Araby, and a Baby Peggy short Peg o' Movies spoofed the film. The title of the Oswald the Lucky Rabbit cartoon The Shriek (1933) is a parody of The Sheik. Much later, Elvis Presley's film Harum Scarum drew from The Sheik as well.
- The blues string band The Mississippi Sheiks, active in the late '20s and early '30s, took their name from The Sheik.
- The popular song "The Sheik of Araby" was written in response to the film. In the fourth season episode of I Love Lucy "The Hedda Hopper Story" (1955), Mrs. McGillicuddy (Kathryn Card) sings part of the song while reminiscing about Valentino's role in the film.
- Jimmy Buffett mentions the Sheik in "Pencil Thin Mustache".
- Chapter one of Art Spiegelman's graphic novel Maus is called "The Sheik", and contains a number of references to Valentino and his most famous film.
- The Sheik is the official mascot of Hollywood High School, and the athletic teams and student body are known as the Sheiks, the name drawn from this movie.
- Ray Stevens' million-selling 1962 pop hit "Ahab the Arab" was heavily influenced by both this film and The Son of the Sheik in the song's use of Arabian atmosphere and music.
- Serbian popular singer Dragana Šarić, also referred to as Bebi Dol, had a hit song called "Rudi" dedicated to Valentino in 1983. In the song, he is referred as "the Sheik's son."
- The Egyptian Lover cites the film as the inspiration for his name.
- In Downton Abbey, season 4, episode 6 the characters Ivy and James go to see The Sheik in theaters on a failed date.

== See also ==
- The House That Shadows Built (1931 promotional film by Paramount)
- A Son of the Sahara (1924)
- Sahara (1983) a Cannon Films production with similar elements.
