= The Sheik (novel) =

1919 novel by Edith Maude Hull

- Author: Edith Maud Hull
- Publisher: E. Nast & Grayson
- Publication date: 1919
- Publication place: United Kingdom
- Pages: 279
- OCLC: 318942378

The Sheik is a 1919 novel by English writer E. M. Hull. It was the first of a series of novels she wrote with desert settings that set off a major revival of the "desert romance" genre of romantic fiction. It was a huge best-seller and the most popular of her books, and it served as the basis for the film of the same name starring the Italian actor Rudolph Valentino in the title role.

== Plot summary ==
The Sheik (1921) by George Melford

The novel opens in a hotel in the Algerian city of Biskra. A dance is being held, hosted by a young woman named Diana Mayo and her brother, Sir Aubrey Mayo. It transpires that Diana is planning to leave on a month-long trip into the desert, taking no one with her but an Arab guide. Nobody thinks this is a sensible idea, and Lady Conway disapprovingly attributes Diana's adventurous plan to her "scandalous" upbringing. Diana's mother had died giving birth to her, and her father had killed himself from grief, with the result that Diana grew up tomboyish, with a freedom that, at the time, was normally only allowed to boys.

Before Diana leaves on her journey, her independent character is further established when she refuses a proposal of marriage, explaining that she doesn't know what love is and doesn't want to know. Once she begins travelling in the desert, it is not long before she is kidnapped by the eponymous Sheik, Ahmed Ben Hassan. It turns out her guide had been bribed.

Ahmed takes Diana to his tent and rapes her, an event that happens between the second and third chapters. Diana spends a few months as Ahmed's captive, being raped regularly and brooding on her hatred for him and her self-loathing. Eventually, she is allowed increasing liberty and starts going riding with Ahmed's valet, Gaston. One day, she manages to escape Gaston on one of these rides and gallops away. She is quickly recaptured by Ahmed, however, and as they are riding back to camp, she is overcome by the sudden realisation that she is in love with him. She knows she can say nothing of this, as Ahmed—who claims to find love dull—will send her away if he learns of her love.

Over time, as Diana submits to Ahmed's violent treatment of her, she regains his trust. It is made clear that he is punishing her because she is English, but not why he is doing this. Eventually, Diana is allowed to go riding again, but is kidnapped by a rival sheik and taken away. When Ahmed finds this out, he realises his love for her and sets out to get her back. He succeeds, but is badly wounded in the process and taken back to his tent. There, one of Ahmed's friends explains to Diana why he hates English people: his father, who was English, had dreadfully mistreated his Spanish mother, and Ahmed had sworn revenge on the entire English nation as a result.

When Ahmed finally recovers, he explains to Diana that he is going to send her away. She is upset, especially when he confesses that he is doing so out of love; he can't bear to mistreat her anymore. Although she pleads with him and avows her love, he stands firm. In despair, Diana reaches for a revolver and attempts to die in the same way as her father. Ahmed wrenches the gun from her, causing the bullet to go astray, and clasps her to him, declaring he will never let her go. The book ends with them passionately declaring their mutual love.

== Literary antecedents and style ==
The Sheik belongs to a tradition of Orientalist romances by British writers that includes Lord Byron's 1813 poem The Giaour and Sir Richard Francis Burton's 1885 version of One Thousand and One Nights entitled The Book of the Thousand Nights and a Night. It also adheres to the major convention of the romance novel: the redemption of a 'lost' male by the power of a woman's love. Desert romance as a genre had been pioneered by writers like Robert Smythe Hichens and Kathlyn Rhodes, but The Sheik set off a major and influential revival of the form.

Hull's prose makes heavy use of sentimental vocabulary and close focus on emotional states that are associated with the romance novel genre:

Diana thought of her own mother dying in the arms of a husband who adored her, and then of the little Spanish girl slipping away from life, a stranger in a strange land, her heart crying out for the husband whom she still loved, turning in ignorance of his love for consolation in the agony of death to the lover she had denied, and seeking comfort in his arms.

Hull was skilled at creating vivid descriptions, but these are often undercut by her reliance on orientalist stereotypes, as in this passage from her 1926 travel memoir Camping in the Sahara:

A string of camels, in charge of wild-eyed desert men and hung with heavy, pendulous sacks stuffed with henna from the south, stalked disdainfully through the crowd with a soft pad of cushioned feet, on their way to the fondouk. Crouched in the sand and dust, ragged and filthy hawkers of sweetmeats and vegetables cursed shrilly when bare-legged boys, clad only in a single garment open to the waist, drove too close to their little stock-in-trade tiny donkeys staggering almost hidden under loads of brushwood and greenstuffs.

== Controversy ==
Throughout its history, The Sheik has attracted controversy, though this has shifted in form over the years. When it was published, it was considered an erotic novel and variously described in the press as "shocking" and "poisonously salacious."

The book was attacked by literary critic Q. D. Leavis in her influential book Fiction and the Reading Public. Leavis dismissed The Sheik as "embodying the typist's day-dream" and claimed that the book would have a "detrimental" effect on its readers' minds.

In more recent decades, the novel has been strongly criticised for its central plot element: the idea that rape leads to love – i.e., forced seduction. Other criticisms have been directed at ideas closely related to the central rape plot: that for women, sexual submission is a necessary and natural condition; and that rape is excused by marriage. Historians have also criticised the Orientalist portrayal of the Arabs in the novel. With its plot centered on the subjugation of a wilful woman, The Sheik has been compared to The Taming of the Shrew by William Shakespeare.

Criticism of the novel has been tempered, however, by other writers observing that women writers of Hull's period used the already well-established genre of Orientalist fantasy to begin putting feminist ideas before their primarily female readership. Women appear as protagonists in desert romances, for example, and in The Sheik specifically, the reader is engaged with Diana as an independent-minded and defiant woman for most of the novel's length, before Hull concludes her story in a conventional way. Moreover, it appears the couple means to live in the desert—a break on Hull's part with the typical romance novel ending that sees the heroine safely ensconced in the townhouses and country estates of the European aristocracy.

Strong contrasts are also painted between the relative liberty of European women and the servitude of their counterparts from the Middle East:

That woman could submit to the degrading intimacy and fettered existence of married life filled [Diana] with scornful wonder. To be bound irrevocably to the will and pleasure of a man who would have the right to demand obedience in all that constituted marriage and the strength to enforce those claims revolted her. For a Western woman it was bad enough, but for the women of the East, mere slaves of the passions of the men who owned them, unconsidered, disregarded, reduced to the level of animals, the bare idea made her quiver.

Although this passage appears early in the novel and is to a great extent negated by Diana's later submission to Ahmed, the questions it raises about women's rights echo some of the main themes of contemporary suffragists.
