= Media coverage of the Israeli–Palestinian conflict =

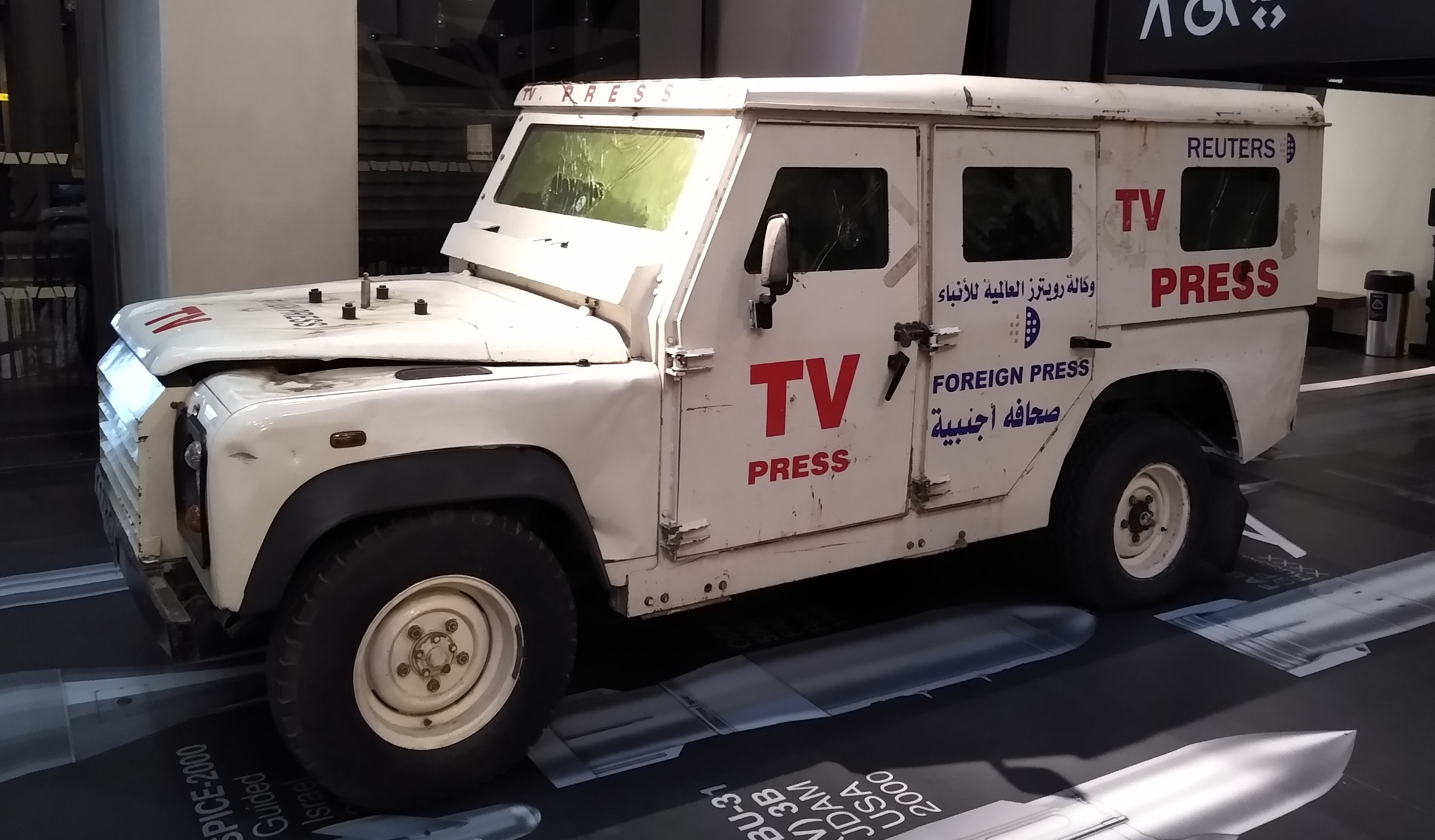
A Reuters armored vehicle that was damaged while reporting on the conflict in 2006, pictured on display at the Imperial War Museum in London.

Media coverage of the Israeli–Palestinian conflict has been said, by both sides and independent observers, to be biased. This coverage includes news, academic discussion, film, and social media. These perceptions of bias, possibly exacerbated by the hostile media effect, have generated more complaints of partisan reporting than any other news topic and have led to a proliferation of media watchdog groups.

== Types of bias ==
=== The language of conflict ===
Several studies have concluded that "terminology bias" has been a recurrent feature of coverage of the conflict, and scholars and commentators such as Yasir Suleiman (Note: "One of the most important aspects of the Arab-Israeli conflict is the manipulation of terminology to create a linguistic map that conditions people's perceptions of the facts on the ground,") argue that language manipulation plays an important role in endeavours to win over the international public, with some concluding that Israel has proven more adept in this battle. Diction, or word choice, affects the interpretation of the same set of entities or events. There is an emotional and semantic difference between the verbs died and killed, and similarly between kill and murder; murder evokes stronger negative emotions and connotes intent. In the context of the Israeli–Palestinian conflict, various terminological issues arise. The terms "disputed territories" versus "occupied territories" reflect different positions on the legal status of the West Bank and Gaza Strip. The terms "security fence" and "apartheid wall," "neighbourhood" and "settlement," and "militant," "freedom fighter" and "terrorist," while used to describe the same entities, present them in a different light and suggest a different narrative. Similarly, describing an attack or bombing as a "response" or "retaliation" again places the events in a different light.

In the immediate aftermath of the Six-Day War Israeli usage initially adopted the standard terminology of referring to the West Bank and Gaza as "occupied territories" (ha-šeṭaḥim ha-kevušim). This was soon replaced by "administered territories" (ha-šeṭaḥim ha-muḥzaqim). Finally, the West Bank area, excluding East Jerusalem, was renamed "Judea and Samaria" (Yehudah we-Šomron), a term chosen to affirm the Biblical basis for the Jewish people's connection to that territory. Rashid Khalidi describes how, in the wake of the Six Day War, Israeli policy-makers have designated East Jerusalem not as "occupied" or a cultural and spiritual centre for Muslims and Arabs for 14 centuries, but as "the eternal, indivisible capital of Israel" and "reunited". While the default term in international law is belligerent occupation, (Note: 'if viewed through the conceptual prism of "Belligerent occupation", the Israeli control of the OPT is possibly the most legalized such regime in world history.') over subsequent decades, U.S. media coverage, which initially described Israel's presence in either of the Palestinian territories as an "occupation", gradually dropped the word and by 2001 it had become "almost taboo" in, and "ethereal in its absence" from, American reportage. (Note: "more than 90 percent of network TV reporting on the occupied territories has failed to report that the territories are occupied.") A poll of British newsreaders that same year found that only 9% were aware that Israel was the occupying power of Palestinian territories. Israeli academic surveys at the time of Operation Defensive Shield (2002) also found that the Israeli public thought the West Bank revolt was evidence that Palestinians were trying, murderously, to wrest control of territories within Israel itself.

In 2002, Greg Myre wrote of the rise of a "verbal arms race" where "(m)uch of the Mideast conflict is about winning international support", one which escalated with the onset of the Al-Aqsa Intifada. Brian Whitaker, reviewing 1,659 articles covering events in the Guardian and Evening Standard for this period (2000–2001), observed the same effects, adding that omission of important adjectives was notable: 66% failed to mention that the incidents took place in an occupied territory. Hebron was described as a divided city, though 99% of its inhabitants are Palestinian, whereas Israel describes Jerusalem as "undivided" though a third of its inhabitants are Palestinian. Likewise, Jews live in "communities", Palestinians in "areas". In his view Israel had won the verbal war. In reporting the 2006 capture of Gilad Shalit on Israeli soil and his removal to the Gaza Strip, and Israel's response of detaining 60 Hamas members, half Palestinian West Bank parliamentarians, the former was said to have been kidnapped while the latter, seized from their beds in night raids and removed to Israeli prisons, were arrested.

According to 2008 analysis, Israeli newspaper reportage of violence, the Israel Defense Forces (IDF) confirms, or says, while the Palestinians claim. The word "violence" itself connotes, according to Gershon Shafir, different events in Israeli and non-Israeli discourse: In the former, it is essentially dissociated from the 50-year-long practice of occupying Palestinian lands and used to refer only to an intermittent recourse to military methods to contain episodic upsurges of hostile Palestinian resistance, a means employed when the security of an otherwise peaceful state is said to be at stake. (Note: The Palestinian view is that Israel's insistence on negotiating a solution to its security concerns, extending to its settlements, is always formulated at the expense of Palestinian rights.) Thus, Israeli violence is restricted to responses to specific events like putting down the First and Second Intifadas, Israel's wars in Gaza and the Palestinian knifing attacks in 2015–2016, (Note: "No name has yet been determined for this series of incidents. Options range from 'the silent intifada', the 'individual intifada', the 'children's intifada', the 'knives intifada', the 'Jerusalem intifada', and the 'third intifada'.") which were mainly the work of lone wolves. (Note: "While identifying the agents as lone wolves, Chorev argues that Palestinian social media were responsible for creating the climate from which they emerged.") Shafir argues to the contrary that the occupation "is best understood as ongoing, day-in and day-out coercion, and its injuries include material, psychological, social, and bodily harm". And, he further claims, it is the coercive techniques of the institutions of occupation deployed to enforce submission that produce the occasional eruptions of "military operations" and wars. Violence is omnipresent reality for Palestinians, on the other hand, and found in all facets of the occupation. Consequently, he concludes, the most intense suppression of uprisings and wars cannot be considered in isolation from the occupation regime as an everyday experience.

Such omissions and alterations in the terms used are cited as an example of the pervasive use of euphemisms or loaded terminology in reportage on the Israeli-Palestinian conflict, a problem which the International Press Institute thought sufficiently important by 2013 to issue a handbook to guide journalists through the semantic minefield. What Palestinians call "assassinations" – the shooting of people suspected of terrorism – Israel first called "pre-emptive strikes", then "pinpoint preventive operations", (Note: "A long-time focus on pinpoint warfare against the PLO and its leaders had concealed the swelling rage of the Palestinian people from Israel's intelligence community and its politicians. The Israelis' tactical achievements and ability to locate and eliminate PLO leaders and militants nearly anywhere in the world had given them the sense that Israel could forever impose its rule over the millions of Palestinians in the occupied territories without consequence.") and also "extrajudicial punishments" or "long-range hot pursuit" until "focused prevention" was finally settled on. Offers to return "occupied territory" are "(painful) concessions" rather than a compliance with international law. For decades, Israeli announcements, speaking of arrests of children, never used the word "child". Even a 10-year-old shot by the IDF could be referred to as "a young man of ten." The use of the term "colonialism" by New Historians to describe Zionist settlement, a term likening the process to the French colonization of Algeria (Note: When the film The Battle of Algiers was played in Israel, one reviewer remarked:"Any viewer who has served in the army in the West Bank will recognize the barb-wire barricades, the sullen Arab faces, the body searches, the frantic chases after shadowy suspects in narrow bazaar alleys and the officers telling reporters that with just a little more time and force the unrest will be quelled". Ariel Sharon told Jacques Chirac, "Mr President. You must understand that for us here it is like Algeria. We have no other place to go and, besides, we have no intention of leaving.") and the Dutch settlement of South Africa, has likewise been challenged, with some asserting that this is a demonizing term used in Palestinian textbooks. Robert Fisk argues that the descriptive language used by major political players and the press to describe the occupation is one of "desemanticization": occupied lands become "disputed territories"; colonies are described as "settlements", "neighbourhoods" (Note: 'Settlement conjures the idea of a virgin, unpopulated territory: an image of building log cabins in the wilderness... "Settlement" also has a useful secondary sense "agreement", but Israeli settlements were deemed illegal by the UN Security Council and the International Court of justice...In 2002 attempts were made in the Israeli and US media to delete the shop-soiled euphemism "settlements" from the lexicon entirely and replace it with the even more euphemistic "neighbourhoods", where you indeed might expect to see white picket fences',) "suburbs", "population centres"; dispossession and exile are referred to as "dislocation"/"displacement"; Israelis are shot by "terrorists" but when Palestinians are shot dead they die in "clashes"; the Wall becomes a "fence" or "security barrier". Suicide bombers for Palestinians are "martyrs" (shahid); (Note: "Palestinians have called suicide bombers 'martyrs', or 'F-11s', a nickname that plays off the Palestinians' view that they don't have high-tech firepower like Israel's F-16 warplanes. 'We have F-11s', they say, wiggling their index and middle fingers simultaneously to approximate the legs of a suicide bomber walking toward a target.") Israel prefers "homicide bombers". Israel calls one of its uses of Palestinians as human shields a "neighbour procedure". (Note: "wherein the Israeli Defense Forces (IDF) has forced Palestinians in the West Bank to enter houses that were thought to be booby-trapped or to approach houses where wanted men were thought to be hiding, in advance of the soldiers who sought to arrest them.") If children are killed by Israeli fire, these events are often contextualized by the "shop-worn euphemism" (Fisk) of their being "caught in the crossfire". Deporting West Bankers to Gaza, which Myre describes as collective punishment for families who have siblings that participated in terror incidents, is described by Israel as an "order limiting the place of residency". Israeli military actions are customarily referred to as "responses" or "retaliations" to a Palestinian attack, even if it is Israel that strikes first.

The Intercept reported that in October 2024, on the outbreak of the Gaza war, an internal memo written by Philip Pan and other senior New York Times editors instructed the paper's journalists to restrict, or avoid or refrain generally from using the terms genocide, ethnic cleansing, occupied territory, Palestine, and refugee camps.

=== Media and academic coverage ===
The quality of both Media coverage of the Arab–Israeli conflict and research and debates on university campuses have been the object of extensive monitoring and research. Public discussion of the occupation is also contested, especially on university campuses. Pro-Israeli Jewish students complain that they have been vilified or harassed; some proposed talks on Palestinian perspectives have been cancelled on the grounds that audiences might not be able to objectively evaluate the material. In response to attempts to silence several high-profile critics of Israeli territorial policies concerns have been expressed that the topic itself is at risk, and that the political pressures restricting research and discussion undermine academic freedom. (Note: "Every year, Stern pointed out, there are twice as many pro-Israel events on campus as pro-Palestinian. For all the heat that BDS, the boycott movement, has generated, no academic institution in America has ever divested from Israel in the 19 years of its existence... Much like the Middle East discord itself, the balance of forces lies overwhelmingly in favor of supporters of Israel, with pro-Palestinian groups vastly outgunned. The toxic atmosphere on some US campuses has been long in gestation. Last year Palestine Legal took on 213 cases involving attempts to quash pro-Palestinian advocacy." (Pilkington 2021)) In the latter regard, organizations like Campus Watch closely report and denounce what they consider "anti-Israeli" attitudes. In addition to Israel's hasbara organization, intent on countering negative press images, there are also many private pro-Israeli organizations, among them CAMERA, FLAME, HonestReporting, Palestinian Media Watch and the Anti-Defamation League which subject reportage to scrutiny in the belief news on Israel has systematically distorted reality to privilege Palestinian versions. In Ehud Barak's view Palestinians are "products of a culture in which to tell a lie..creates no dissonance". (Note: The statement is contextualized within a general tradition, visible in the writings of many journalists and scholars, of orientalist put-downs of Arabs by Krishna, who quotes the full text." They (Palestinians) are products of a culture.. in which to tell a lie creates no dissonance. They don't suffer from the problem of telling lies that exists in Judeo-Christian culture. Truth is seen as an irrelevant category") Others allow that both sides lie, but "Arabs" are better at it. (Note: "The Arab countries are often dictatorships which exist thanks to lack of transparency. Everything is based on appearances. Both parties, but in particular the Arabs, lie the whole day. You have to check their statements there on the spot.") The term Pallywood was coined to suggest that Palestinian coverage of their plight, in a genre called "traumatic realism", is marked by a diffuse intent to fraudulently manipulate the media, beginning with the killing of Mohammad Durrah, and, it has been argued, still being evoked as late as 2014 to dismiss Israeli responsibility for the Beitunia killings. The idea has been dismissed as bearing the hallmarks of a "conspiracy theory".

In university settings, organizations like Campus Watch closely report and denounce what they consider "anti-Israeli" attitudes. Academics like Sara Roy have argued on the other hand that "the climate of intimidation and censorship surrounding the Israeli-Palestinian conflict, both inside (at all levels of the education hierarchy) and outside the U.S. academy, is real and longstanding". On the other hand, book-length studies have been devoted to testing the theory that the world's understanding of the conflict, though "mediated by Israeli newspapers to a domestic audience", is "anti-Israel". (Note: Müller found the assumption attributed to Israeli media reportage that "the whole world is against Israel" was born out by a comprehensive methodological examination of Israeli sources: "The reality mediated in Israeli newspapers indeed portrays an image of the world that is in large parts critical or even hostile towards the state of Israel, its actions and policies. Regardless of whether these portrayals correspond with a truth, media representations contribute to the perpetuation of such popular beliefs and sentiments, and in doing so may affect the conflict realities themselves".) Attempts have been made to silence several high-profile critics of Israeli policies in the territories, among them Tony Judt, Norman Finkelstein, Joseph Massad, Nadia Abu El-Haj and William I. Robinson. Such difficulties have given rise to anxieties that the topic itself is at risk, and that the political pressures circumscribing research and discussion undermine academic freedom itself.

Internal Israeli studies have argued that local press coverage has traditionally been conservative, reflecting the often tendentious and biased views of the political and military establishment, and similar tendencies have been noted in Palestinian reportage. In a sample of 48 reports of 22 Palestinian deaths, 40 Israeli accounts only gave the IDF version, a mere 8 included a Palestinian reaction. Tamar Liebes, former director of the Smart Institute of Communication at the Hebrew University, argued that Israeli "Journalists and publishers see themselves as actors within the Zionist movement, not as critical outsiders". (Note: Quoted by Yonatan Mendel who clarifies: 'This is not to say that Israeli journalism is not professional. Corruption, social decay and dishonesty are pursued with commendable determination by newspapers, TV and radio... When it comes to "security" there is no such freedom. It's "us" and "them", the IDF and the "enemy"; military discourse, which is the only discourse allowed, trumps any other possible narrative. It's not that Israeli journalists are following orders, or a written code: just that they'd rather think well of their security forces'. Ariel Sharon predicted that: "What will largely dictate public opinion in Israel is the attitude of the IDF".) The explosive expansion of the Internet has opened up a larger sphere of controversy. Digital forensics flourishing on social networks have occasionally revealed problems with a few widely circulating images of dead Palestinians, but, according to Kuntzman and Stein, technical suspicion quickly yielded ground, among Israeli Jewish social media practitioners who combined a politics of militant nationalism with global networking conventions, to unfounded polemical claims, making out that, 'the fraudulent, deceiving Palestinian was a "natural condition" that required no substantiation', and that, generically, images of dead or injured Palestinians were faked. Palestinians commonly use the phrases "gang of settlers" or "herd of settlers" to refer to Israeli settlers, expressions perceived as offensive and dehumanising because "gang" implies thuggish criminality (though Israeli settlement of the West Bank has been found to be illegal under international law) and "herd" uses animal imagery to refer to people. A former vice president of the Jewish Council for Public Affairs in the United States has remarked that many rabbis themselves address their congregations by tiptoeing around the topic of Israel and Palestine, and that there is a widespread fear that speaking forthrightly will make their community life and careers insecure. (Note: '"One of the concerns we have — and we hear this over and over again from rabbis and community leaders — people are afraid to discuss Israel," Ethan Felson, then vice president of the Jewish Council for Public Affairs, the umbrella body for Jewish policy groups and Jewish community relations councils, told JTA back in 2011. "People fear for their jobs, their professional lives if they have these conversations.".'(Cramer 2021))

A 2001 study of US coverage of the Second Intifada by Seth Ackerman concluded that press coverage had highlighted violent displays and demonstrations of Palestinian grievances as if it were Palestinians who "looked for a confrontation", but consistently failed to add any context of the systematic abuses to which they are subjected.

John Mearsheimer and Stephen Walt argued in The Israel Lobby and U.S. Foreign Policy that "the American media's coverage of Israel tends to be strongly biased in Israel's favour" compared to reportage in other democratic countries' media, with a tendency to marginalize anyone who voices a critical attitude. (Note: "channelling public discourse in a pro-Israeli direction is crucially important, because an open and candid discussion of Israeli policy in the Occupied Territories, Israeli history, and the lobby's role in shaping America's Middle East policy might easily lead more Americans to question existing policy".) Marda Dunsky argues that empirical work appears to support Mearsheimer and Walt's claim. She concluded that coverage of (a) the refugee problem; (b) settlements; (c) the historical and political background, (which are either frequently skimmed over or entirely omitted), and (d) violence, "reflects the parameters of U.S. Middle East policy", regarding both U.S. aid and support for Israel. (Note: "The present study critically assesses reportage of these four themes to demonstrate not only that the Israeli-Palestinian conflict appears – through the mainstream media lens – to consist of an unending cycle of failed diplomacy, brutal violence, impervious rhetoric, and dashed hopes for peace but also that many aspects of its organic reality are all but obscured in this refraction. Although the reportage offers no shortage of details and images, its lack of context, coherence, and, ultimately clarity severely limits the range of American public discourse on the conflict and ultimately stifles public opinion that could effect constructive change.") This view that American media are biased towards Palestinians has been challenged by authors who cite research that concluded most mainstream media have a "liberal" bias, a criticism extended to European outlets like Le Monde and the BBC.

In a 2024 op ed, Israeli historian Ilan Pappe asserted that it is better to talk about the Palestinian resistance and decolonisation of Palestine from the river to the sea, instead of using the misleading language of the American and Western media such as "Iran-backed terrorist group Hamas" or "peace process". He argued that universities and mainstream media still refuse to define the Zionist project as a colonial project, or, as he believes it is more accurately called, a settler-colonial project.

==== Retaliation ====
A study by the American organization Fairness and Accuracy in Reporting monitored the use of the term "retaliation" in the nightly news broadcasts of the three main American networks CBS, ABC, and NBC between September 2000 through March 17, 2002. It found that of the 150 occasions when "retaliate" and its variants were used to describe attacks in the Israeli/Palestinian conflict, 79 percent were references to Israel "retaliating" and only 9 percent were references to Palestinians "retaliating".

==== Emotive language ====
In a 2004 study of BBC television news coverage, the Glasgow Media Group documented differences in the language used by journalists for Israelis and Palestinians. The study found that terms such as "atrocity," "brutal murder," "mass murder," "savage cold blooded killing," "lynching" and "slaughter" were used to describe the death of Israelis but not the death of Palestinians. The word "terrorist" was often used to describe Palestinians. However, in reports of an Israeli group attempting to bomb a Palestinian school, members of the Israeli group were referred to as "extremists" or "vigilantes" but not as "terrorists."

A study by Greg Philo and Mike Berry published in openDemocracy found that in BBC coverage of the Gaza war from 7 October to 4 November 2023, the word "massacre" was only used to describe Israeli deaths, despite a larger number of Palestinians being killed.

=== Omission ===
A 2001 study by Fairness and Accuracy In Reporting (FAIR) found only 4% of US network news reports concerning Gaza or the West Bank mentioned that these are occupied territories. The figure was cited in the 2003 documentary Peace, Propaganda & the Promised Land, screened by the Canadian Broadcasting Company (CBC) in 2008. CBC's French-language radio ombud questioned the independence of FAIR's research, referring to the group as a "pro-Palestinian" and "militant group." FAIR responded by updating their analysis for the 2008-09 period, finding that number had gone down to only 2% of network news programs about Gaza or the West Bank mentioning an occupation.

=== Lack of verification ===
The ethics and standards of journalism require journalists to verify the factual accuracy of the information they report. Factual verification" is what separates journalism from other modes of communication, such as propaganda, fiction or entertainment". Lack of verification involves the publication of potentially unreliable information prior to or without independent confirmation of the facts, and has resulted in various scandals. In the context of the Israel-Palestinian conflict, for example, consider:

- The Battle of Jenin, after which early media reports claimed that Israel "massacred" hundreds of Palestinian civilians. Later investigations by the United Nations and Human Rights Watch estimated the total Palestinian death toll at 52 (with estimates of civilian deaths ranging from 22 to 26) and contradicted previous claims that a massacre had taken place.
- The Islamic Jihad shooting attack on Kiryat Arba in November 2002, which Western media reports described as an attack on "worshipers," resulting in international condemnations. According to the Jerusalem Post, Islamic Jihad "opened fire at a [sic] security forces safeguarding Jewish worshipers," and according to both Haaretz and the Jerusalem Post, the twelve Israelis killed all belonged to the IDF, the Israeli Border Police, or the Hebron security force.

In a 2021 analysis of Austrian media reporting on the conflict, political scientist Florian Markl found that such failures of verification disproportionately affected Israel, with these failures consistently and incorrectly presenting Israel as the aggressor or Palestine as the victim.

=== Selective reporting ===
Selective reporting involves devoting more resources, such as news articles or air time, to the coverage of one side of the story over another.

In 2014 former AP correspondent Matti Friedman criticised the media for ignoring certain aspects of the conflict (such as Ehud Olmert's peace offer, the corruption of the Palestinian Authority, the Hamas charter and the intimidation of reporters by Hamas) for political reasons.

=== Disproportionate coverage ===
A former AP correspondent Matti Friedman criticised the media for focusing on the Arab-Israeli conflict in the disproportionate manner compared to other conflicts with more casualties, citing the example of his former employer having more staff in Israel and Palestine than in the whole of Africa, China or India.

=== False compromise ===
False compromise refers to the claim, made by some Israeli advocates and by some Palestinian advocates, that their side of the conflict is morally right and the other side is morally wrong and, therefore, attempts to balance the presentation of both viewpoints wrongfully suggests that both sides are morally equivalent. In the words of journalist Bret Stephens, "Moral clarity is a term that doesn't get much traction these days, least of all among journalists, who prefer 'objectivity' and 'balance.' Yet good journalism is more than about separating fact from opinion and being fair. Good journalism is about fine analysis and making distinctions, and this applies as much to moral distinctions as to any others. Because too many reporters today refuse to make moral distinctions, we are left with a journalism whose narrative and analytical failings have become ever more glaring".

=== Media bias ===
Research indicates that major U.S. news outlets often portray the Gaza war in a manner that favors Israeli viewpoints. A study analyzing over 1,000 articles from prominent newspapers such as The New York Times, The Washington Post, and the Los Angeles Times found a consistent bias against Palestinians. These publications disproportionately emphasized Israeli casualties, employed emotive language to describe Israeli suffering, and provided extensive coverage of antisemitic incidents in the U.S., while largely overlooking anti-Muslim racism following significant events.

The perceived imbalance in reporting has prompted responses from within the journalistic community. In 2021, over 500 journalists signed an open letter expressing concerns about U.S. media's neglect of Israel's oppression of Palestinians. This movement gained momentum in 2023, with more than 1,500 journalists from various U.S. news organizations signing a letter protesting Western media's coverage of Israeli actions against Palestinians.

More than 400 media figures, including 111 BBC staffers, have signed a letter to the BBC for removal of board member Robbie Gibb over a conflict of interest on Gaza and the Middle East and "concerns over opaque editorial decisions and censorship at the BBC on the reporting of Israel-Palestine".

== Reasons for bias ==
=== Coercion or censorship ===
Coercion or censorship refers to the use of intimidation or force to promote favorable reports and to confiscate unfavorable reports. In the Israeli–Palestinian conflict, both sides accuse each other of coercion or censorship as an explanation of alleged bias in favor of the other side. In support of these claims, Israeli advocates point to kidnappings of foreign reporters by Palestinians, while Palestinian advocates point to media blackouts and confiscation of reports by Israelis. Additionally, both sides point to reports by both governmental and non-governmental organizations, which assess the degree of journalistic freedom in the region.

=== Prejudiced journalists ===
Journalists may intentionally or unintentionally distort reports due to political ideology, national affiliation, antisemitism, anti-Arabism, or Islamophobia.

Richard Falk, United Nations special rapporteur on Palestinian human rights, has stated that in the media-distorted picture surrounding the Middle East, those who reports honestly and factually are accused of bias, whereas pro-Israel bias is perceived as mainstream. Falk has stated that because the media don't adequately report violations of international law by Israel, "the American public isn't aware of the behavior of Israel or the victimization of the Palestinian people. This creates a kind of imbalance." Ira Stoll of the New York Sun, and formerly of the Jerusalem Post, attributes alleged anti-Israel media bias in part to reporters of Jewish background.

== Contentious incidents ==
To substantiate claims that the media favors the other side, participants in the conflict on each side frequently cite a number of illustrative and extreme examples of controversial reporting. This section lists incidents of controversial reporting frequently cited by only Israelis and Israel advocates, by only Palestinians and Palestinian advocates, or by both sides. The list of incidents appear chronologically, according to when the incident took place. Where events took place on the same date, the incidents appear sorted alphabetically.

=== Killing of Muhammad al-Durrah ===
On September 30, 2000, the 11- to 12-year-old boy, Muhammad al-Durrah, was shot in Palestinian-Israeli crossfire at the Netzarim junction. France 2, which caught the incident on tape, claimed that Israel had fatally shot the boy. After an official, internal investigation, the IDF conceded that it was probably responsible and apologized for the shooting. Al-Durrah became a symbol of the Second Intifada and of Palestinian martyrdom.

External investigations suggested that the IDF could not have shot the boy and that the tape had been staged. In 2001, following a non-military investigation, conducted by Israeli Southern Command Maj.-Gen. Yom Tov Samia, the Israeli Prime Minister's Foreign Media Advisor, Dr. Ra'anan Gissin, along with Daniel Seaman of the Israeli Government Press Office (GPO) publicly challenged the accuracy of the France 2 report. In 2005, the head of the Israeli National Security Agency, Major-General (res.) Giora Eiland publicly retracted the IDF's initial admittance of responsibility. To avoid negative publicity and a resulting backlash, the IDF did not conduct its own official, military investigation until 2007. On October 1, 2007, Israel officially denied responsibility for the shooting and claimed that the France 2 footage had been staged, prompting criticism from Al-Durrah's father.

However, in early 2012, Dr. David Yehudah was sued by al-Dura's father and was acquitted in French court.

The French defamation case was definitely settled on June 26, 2013, by the French Court of Appeals: Philippe Karsenty was convicted of defamation and fined €7,000 by the Paris Court of Appeals. Karsenty's version, which described the killing of young Mohammed Al Durah as "staged", was rejected by the French Court's final decision.

=== Photo of Tuvia Grossman ===
Associated Press photograph misidentified Tuvia Grossman's nationality and the photograph's location, and implied police brutality by Grossman's Israeli rescuer.

On September 30, 2000, The New York Times, the Associated Press, and other media outlets published a photograph of a club-wielding Israeli police officer standing over a battered and bleeding young man. The photograph's caption identified the young man as a Palestinian and the location as the Temple Mount. The young man in the picture was 20-year-old Tuvia Grossman, a Jewish American student from Chicago who had been studying at a Yeshiva in Israel; the Israeli police officer in the photograph, actually came to his rescue by threatening his Palestinian assailants.

After a complaint by Grossman's father, The New York Times issued a correction on October 4. A few days later the Times published an article about the incident and printed a more complete correction. The Times attributed the error to a misidentification by the Israeli agency that took the photo compounded by a further misidentification by the Associated Press "which had received many pictures of injured Palestinians that day".

More than 20 years after the incident, the Grossman photo is cited as one of the most infamous examples of distorted media coverage in the Israel-Palestine conflict. Instead of showing Israeli aggression against a Palestinian, what the photo really showed was a Jewish victim of a brutal attack committed by Arabs. The episode is often cited by those who accuse the media of having an anti-Israel bias, and was the impetus for the founding of pro-Israel media watchdog HonestReporting.

Seth Ackerman of FAIR described the attention given to the photo, as well as the two NYT corrections, as disproportionate to a "plausible, though careless" assumption resulting from "garbled information from the Israeli photographer".

=== Battle of Jenin ===
On April 3, 2002, following the Passover massacre on March 27 which killed 30 Israeli civilians and wounded as many as 143, the IDF began a major military operation in the Jenin refugee camp, a city which, according to Israel, had "served as a launching site for numerous terrorist attacks against both Israeli civilians and Israeli towns and villages in the area". The fighting, which lasted eight days and resulted in the deaths of 52 Palestinians (including 14 civilians, according to the IDF, and 22 civilians, according to HRW) and 23 Israeli soldiers, has been interpreted quite differently by Israelis and Palestinians. In the aftermath of the fighting, chief Palestinian negotiator Saeb Erekat claimed that the IDF had killed 500 Palestinians and accused Israel of committing a "massacre". Early news publications, following both IDF estimates of 200 Palestinians killed and Palestinian estimates of 500 Palestinians killed, reported hundreds of Palestinian deaths and repeated claims that a massacre had taken place. Human Rights Watch and Amnesty International later found that no massacre had taken place, although both organizations charged the IDF with war crimes and human rights violations. The United Nations similarly dismissed claims that hundreds of Palestinians had been killed as unsubstantiated, a finding which was widely interpreted and reported as rejecting claims of a "massacre".

Israelis cite the reporting surrounding the Battle of Jenin Palestinian allegations that a massacre had taken place, a claim disputed by Amnesty International and Human Rights Watch.

=== Gaza beach blast ===
On June 9, 2006, an explosion on a beach in the Gaza Strip killed seven Palestinians, including three children. Palestinian sources claimed that the explosion resulted from Israeli shelling. After a three-day investigation, Israel concluded that the blast could not have resulted from an IDF artillery shell. This IDF investigation was criticized by both Human Rights Watch and The Guardian for ignoring evidence. The IDF agreed that the report should have mentioned two gunboat shells fired at about the time of the deaths but stated that these shells had landed too far away from the area to be the cause of the explosion and this omission did not impact the report's overall conclusion that Israel had not been responsible for the blast. According to Human Rights Watch, the IDF acknowledged that the cause of the blast may have been an unexploded 155mm artillery shell from an earlier shelling, or another location, but suggested it might have been placed there as an IED by Palestinians.

An investigation by Human Rights Watch concluded that the explosion was caused by a 155mm Israeli artillery shell, stating that 'The shrapnel, crater, and injuries all point to this weapon as the cause.'

=== 2006 Lebanon War photographs controversies ===
On August 5, 2006 Charles Foster Johnson of Little Green Footballs accused Reuters of inappropriately manipulating images of destruction to Beirut caused by Israel during the Second Lebanon War. In response to these allegations, Reuters toughened its photo editing policy and admitted to inappropriate photo manipulation on the part of Adnan Hajj, a freelance photographer whom Reuters subsequently fired. Additionally, BBC, The New York Times, and the Associated Press recalled photos or corrected captions in response to some of the accusations. This journalistic scandal, dubbed "Reutersgate" by the blogosphere in reference to the Watergate scandal and is frequently cited by Israelis and by Israel advocates to demonstrate alleged anti-Israel bias, this time in the form of an outright forgery created by a biased local freelance photographer.

=== "Mystery of Israel's Secret Uranium Bomb" ===
On October 28, 2006, The Independent published an article, by Robert Fisk, which speculated, based on information from the European Committee on Radiation Risk, that Israel may have used depleted uranium weapons during the 2006 Lebanon War. The article prompted criticism by HonestReporting for coming to conclusions prematurely, and resulted in an investigation by the United Nations Environment Programme (UNEP). On November 8, 2006, UNEP concluded that Israel had not used any form of uranium-based weapons. Israelis and Israel advocates cite the article as an instance of "shoddy journalism", arising allegedly as a result of media sensationalism.

=== Samir Kuntar as a hero ===
On July 19, 2008, Al Jazeera TV broadcast a program from Lebanon that covered the "welcome-home" festivities for Samir Kuntar, a Lebanese militant who had been imprisoned in Israel for murdering several people, including a four-year-old child, in a Palestinian Liberation Front raid from Lebanon. In the program, the head of Al Jazeera's Beirut office, Ghassan bin Jiddo, praised Kuntar as a "pan-Arab hero" and organized a birthday party for him. In response, Israel's Government Press Office (GPO) threatened to boycott the satellite channel unless it apologized. A few days later an official letter was issued by Al Jazeera's director general, Wadah Khanfar, in which he admitted that the program violated the station's Code of Ethics and that he had ordered the channel's programming director to take steps to ensure that such an incident does not recur.

=== Baby death date misrepresentation ===
A Gaza man falsely claimed that his five-month-old baby died on March 23, 2012, when the generator powering his respirator ran out of fuel, a result of the Egyptian blockade on Gaza and Egyptian cut-off of fuel to Gaza. The baby's death, which had been "confirmed" by a Gaza health official, would have been the first to be connected with the territory's energy shortage. The baby's father, Abdul-Halim Helou, said that his son Mohammed was born with a lymphatic disorder and needed removal of the fluids that accumulated in his respiratory system, and had only a few months to live. He said that they had erred in how much fuel was required and that if they had been "living in a normal country with electricity", his son's chances of living longer would have been better.

However, the report was called into question when it emerged that the timing of the baby's death had been misrepresented, and appeared to be an attempt by Gaza's Hamas rulers to exploit the death to gain sympathy. The Associated Press later learned that news of Mohammed Helou's death had already appeared on March 4 in the local Arabic newspaper Al-Quds and that Hamas was now trying to recycle the story to capitalize on the family's tragedy. The Al-Quds article contained the same details as the later report, but with an earlier date. When confronted by the Associated Press, the family and Hamas official Bassem al-Qadri continued to insist that the baby had only recently died. The AP reporter Diaa Hadid tweeted, "#Hamas misrepresented a story. Two Hamas officials misled us and so did the family."

The Associated Press then retracted the story, explaining that "The report has been called into question after it was learned that a local newspaper carried news of the baby's death on March 4."

An Israeli government spokesman said he was not surprised by Hamas' attempt to "hide the truth and manipulate the information that is allowed to get out of Gaza."

=== Gaza floods caused by opening dams in Israel ===
Gaza is a coastal plain, bordering the Negev desert which witnesses flash floods during heavy rains as water runs across the surface of the impervious desert soil. During the 2013 winter storm in the Middle east Ma'an News Agency reported that Israel opened dams, leading to Gaza floods. However, no such dams actually exist.

=== Gazan paramedic killed by the Israeli army ===
Razan Ashraf Abdul Qadir al-Najjar was a nurse/paramedic who was killed by the Israeli army while volunteering as a medic during the 2018 Gaza border protests. She was fatally shot in the chest by an Israeli soldier as she, reportedly with her arms raised to show she was unarmed, tried to help evacuate the wounded near Israel's border fence with Gaza.

The Israeli army released footage in which she purportedly admitted to participating in the protests as a human shield, supposedly at the request of Hamas. The video was later found to be a clip from an interview with a Lebanese television station that had been edited by the IDF to misleadingly take al-Najjar's comments out of context. In the actual, unedited video, she made no mention of Hamas, and called herself a "rescuing human shield to protect and save the wounded at the front lines", with everything following "human shield" trimmed out of the Israeli clip. The IDF was widely criticized for tampering with the video to chip away at her image.

== Films ==
This section discusses films with media coverage of the Arab-Israeli conflict as its main topic. The films presented in this section appear in alphabetical order.

=== Décryptage ===
Décryptage is a 2003 documentary written by Jacques Tarnero and directed by Philippe Bensoussan. The French film (with English subtitles) examines media coverage of the Arab–Israeli conflict in French media, and claims that the media's presentation of the Israeli–Palestinian conflict in France is consistently skewed against Israel and may be responsible for exacerbating antisemitism.

=== Peace, Propaganda, and the Promised Land ===
Peace, Propaganda, and the Promised Land is a 2004 documentary by Sut Jhally and Bathsheba Ratzkoff. The movie claims that the influence of pro-Israel media watchdog groups, such as CAMERA and Honest Reporting, leads to distorted and pro-Israel media reports. In its response to the movie, the pro-Israel JCRC criticizes the film for not discussing the influence of "the numerous pro‐Palestinian media watchdog groups, including, ironically, FAIR (Fair and Accuracy in the Media, which describes itself as 'A National Media Watch Group'), whose spokesperson played a prominent role in the film". According to the pro-Palestinian LiP Magazine, the movie "offers a great starting point for thinking about media misrepresentation of the Israel-Palestinian conflict, and useful analysis of how language is used to manipulate public opinion," but is short on "solid statistics and facts to back up some of its blanket statements". A review in The New York Times by Ned Martel found that the film "largely ignores Palestinian leadership, which has surely played a part in the conflict's broken vows and broken hearts. And such a lack of dispassion weakens the one-sided film's bold and detailed argument".

== Internet and social media ==
Advocacy groups, governments and individuals use the Internet, new media and social media to try to influence public perceptions of both sides in the Arab/Palestinian–Israeli conflict. Jerusalem Post writer Megan Jacobs has written "War in the Middle East is being waged not only on the ground, but also in cyberspace." While Israeli and Palestinian advocacy websites promote their respective points of view, fierce debate over the Arab–Israeli conflict has embroiled social networking websites and applications with user-generated content, such as Facebook, Google Earth, Twitter and Wikipedia. According to an Associated Press article, Israelis and Palestinians make use of social media to promote "rival narratives" and draw attention to their own suffering to gain international sympathy and backing. However, "distortions and mistakes are instantly magnified on a global scale."

=== Facebook ===
Facebook is a social networking website, which allows users to connect and interact with other people online, both directly by "friending" people and indirectly through the creation of groups. Because the website allows users to join networks organized by city, workplace, school, and region, Facebook has become embroiled in a number of regional conflicts. Facebook groups such as "'Palestine' Is not a country... De-list it from Facebook as a country!" and "Israel is not a country! ... Delist it from Facebook as a country!", among others reflecting the mutual non-recognition of the Israeli–Palestinian conflict, have protested Facebook's listing of Israel and Palestine, respectively, as countries. This controversy became particularly heated when, in response to protests over Palestine being listed as a country, Facebook delisted it. The move infuriated Palestinian users and prompted the creation of numerous Facebook groups such as "The Official Petition to get Palestine listed as a Country", "Against delisting Palestine from Facebook", and "If Palestine is removed from Facebook ... I'm closing my account". Facebook, in response to user complaints, ultimately reinstated Palestine as a country network. A similar controversy took place regarding the status of Israeli settlements. When Israeli settlements were moved from being listed under the Israel network to the Palestine network, thousands of Israelis living in the area protested Facebook's decision. In response to the protest, Facebook has allowed users living in the area to select either Israel or Palestine as their home country.

Another controversy over Facebook regarding the Arab-Israeli conflict concerns Facebook groups which, against Facebook's terms of use, promote hatred and violence. According to former Israeli Prime Minister Shimon Peres, Facebook has been used to promote anti-Semitism and anti-Zionism. A proliferation of Facebook groups praising the perpetrator of the Mercaz HaRav massacre in 2008 prompted the creation of the Facebook group "FACEBOOK: Why do you support Anti-Semitism and Islamic Terrorism", which claimed to have succeeded in deleting over 100 pro-Palestinian Facebook groups with violent content, by reporting the groups to Facebook. The group, which since evolved into the Jewish Internet Defense Force, took over the Facebook group "Israel is not a country! Delist it from Facebook as a country" when, according to the JIDF, Facebook stopped removing such groups. After taking over the group, the JIDF began to remove its more than 48,000 members and replaced the group's graphic with a picture of an IAF jet with the flag of Israel in the background. This sparked controversy.

=== Twitter ===
According to a McClatchy news article, those using social media, including even official spokesmen and public officials, have a habit of "re-purposing" older photographs and videos to illustrate current-day events. Few people check the accuracy of the material before spreading it to others. During the March 2012 Gaza–Israel clashes there were three such notable Twitter incidents. Ofir Gendelman, a spokesman for Israeli Prime Minister Benjamin Netanyahu, tweeted a photo of an Israeli woman and her two children ducking a Gaza rocket describing it as "when a rocket fired by terrorists from Gaza is about to hit their home." When it was proved the photo was from 2009 he said "I never stated that the photo was current. It illustrates the fear that people in southern Israel live in." Avital Leibovich, the head of the foreign desk for Israel's military, sent a tweet from her official account of a video of rockets from Gaza being fired at Israel. It later was discovered the video had been taken in October 2011. When questioned she said her tweet was not misleading and "Launching a rocket does not differ whether it happened in November, July or now".

Leibovich was one of a number of bloggers who criticized Khulood Badawi, an Information and Media Coordinator for the United Nations Office for the Coordination of Humanitarian Affairs who tweeted a picture of a Palestinian child covered in blood. She captioned it "Another child killed by #Israel... Another father carrying his child to a grave in #Gaza." It was discovered the picture was published in 2006 and was of a Palestinian girl who had died in an accident and been brought to the hospital shortly after an Israeli air strike in Gaza. Israel's Ambassador to the United Nations Ron Prosor called for Badawi's dismissal, stating that she was "directly engaged in spreading misinformation". Humanitarian Coordinator and the Head of Office in Jerusalem later met with officials at the Ministry of Foreign Affairs of Israel to discuss these events. UN Under-Secretary General Valerie Amos wrote, "It is regrettable that an OCHA staff member has posted information on her personal Twitter profile, which is both false and which reflects on issues that are related to her work."

A few days later Badawi tweeted on her personal account "Correction: I tweeted the photo believing it was from the last round of violence & it turned out to be from 2006 This is my personal account." Ma'an News Agency reported a week later that the hospital medical report on the dead girl stated that she died "due to falling from a high area during the Israeli strike on Gaza". There are differing accounts of how the Israeli air strike, reported to be as little as 100 meters away, may have caused the accident.

In the immediate aftermath of the 2021 Israeli-Palestinian crisis, Associated Press reporter Emily Wilder was fired because of tweets made during the conflict, after right-wing media sources complained of her pro-Palestinian views.

=== Instagram ===
Instagram, which is owned by Meta Platforms, has been mentioned in reports and by users in relation to content moderation during the Israel–Gaza war. According to Al Jazeera reporting and civil rights groups, some users and journalists said that posts related to Palestine, including hashtags such as #FreePalestine and #IStandWithPalestine, appeared to receive reduced visibility, lower engagement, or were at times removed or limited on the platform.

In October 2023, a Meta spokesperson said that a drop in engagement affecting certain posts was caused by a technical bug and was not related to the content itself. At the same time, civil rights organisations such as 7amleh reported hundreds of cases across Meta platforms, including Instagram, involving content removal and account restrictions.

There were also claims from users that their accounts or posts were being "shadowbanned", meaning their content became less visible without clear notification. Meta has disputed these claims, stating that its moderation systems are applied consistently and that enforcement actions are based on violations of platform policies rather than political considerations.

=== Wikipedia ===
Wikipedia is an online, collaboratively written encyclopedia. While editing conflicts occur frequently, one particular conflict, involving CAMERA and The Electronic Intifada, was reported in The Jerusalem Post and the International Herald Tribune (IHT). When CAMERA encouraged individuals sympathetic to Israel to participate in editing Wikipedia to "lead to more accuracy and fairness on Wikipedia", The Electronic Intifada accused CAMERA of "orchestrating a secret, long-term campaign to infiltrate the popular online encyclopedia Wikipedia to rewrite Palestinian history, pass off crude propaganda as fact, and take over Wikipedia administrative structures to ensure these changes go either undetected or unchallenged." The accusations led to administrative actions on Wikipedia—including the banning of certain editors. In a separate article entitled "The Wild West of Wikipedia", which appeared in The Jewish Chronicle and IMRA, Gilead Ini of CAMERA decried "Wikipedia's often-skewed entries about the Middle East", described Wikipedia's rules as "shoddily enforced", and wrote that, following the incident, "many editors who hoped to ensure accuracy and balance ... are now banned" while "partisan editors ... continue to freely manipulate Wikipedia articles to their liking".

Two Israeli right-wing groups, the Yesha Council and My Israel, launched a project to increase the dissemination of pro-Israel views on Wikipedia. The project organiser, Ayelet Shaked, emphasized that the information has to be reliable and meet Wikipedia rules. "The idea is not to make Wikipedia rightist but for it to include our point of view," said Naftali Bennett, the director of the Yesha Council. In this vein, the groups taught a course on how to edit Wikipedia. The Yesha Council also launched a new prize, "Best Zionist Editor," to be awarded to the most productive editor on Israel-related topics.

In 2013, news outlets including Haaretz and France24 reported the indefinite block of an editor who had concealed the fact that he was an employee of right-wing media group NGO Monitor. The editor was reported to have edited English Wikipedia articles on the Israeli–Palestinian conflict "in an allegedly biased manner".

In September 2024, Jewish Insider reported that a group of editors from the coalition "Tech for Palestine" had been using third-party tools, such as Discord, to coordinate efforts in what they called the "information battle for truth, peace and justice" on the "Wikipedia front". Their activities included compiling lists of pages they planned to edit, requesting specific changes, and sharing instructional "how-to" videos. One of their resources said: "Wikipedia is not just an online encyclopedia. It's a battleground for narratives." The investigation found that "The current conservative edit impact estimate for the group (based on available evidence) is 260 edits on 114 articles".

According to Jewish Insider, the group was partially responsible for the decision to categorize the Anti-Defamation League as an unreliable source on topics related to the Israeli–Palestinian conflict. The Jewish Journal of Greater Los Angeles has suggested that despite the site's political neutrality, editors often attempt to inject their own bias when editing articles.

In December 2024, the Arbitration Committee banned two pro-Palestine editors indefinitely and restricted three others for "canvassing", or notifying fellow editors about a discussion pertaining to a specific edit "with the intention of influencing the outcome of a discussion a particular way". The committee accused the editors of "encouraging other users to game the extended confirmed restriction and engage in disruptive editing".

In January 2025, the Arbitration Committee topic-banned six "pro-Palestine" and two "pro-Israel" editors from editing articles related to the conflict. The bans were related to the editors' behavior and conduct, not their views. The Arbitration Committee also found that sock puppet accounts are "an ongoing issue... causing significant disruption". In addition to the bans, the Committee introduced the "balanced editing restriction", which requires sanctioned users to devote only a third of their edits to articles related to the Israeli–Palestinian conflict even when no misconduct rules have been violated.

== See also ==
- History of Palestinian journalism
- Israeli occupation of the West Bank
- Israeli Military Censor
- Israel-related animal conspiracy theories
- 2006 Fox journalists kidnapping
- Adnan Hajj photographs controversy
- Hasbara
- Jewish Internet Defense Force
- James Miller
- Fadel Shana'a
- Deception: Betraying the Peace Process
- Media of Israel
- Media coverage of the Gaza War (2008–2009)
- Media coverage of the 2014 Israel–Gaza conflict
- Media coverage of the Gaza war

== Sources ==
- Aaronsohn, Ran (Fall 1996). "Settlement in Eretz Israel – A Colonialist Enterprise? "Critical" Scholarship and Historical Geography". Israel Studies. 1 (2): 214–229. doi:10.2979/ISR.1996.1.2.214. ISSN 1084-9513. JSTOR 30245498.
- Ackerman, Seth (Winter 2001). "Al-Aqsa Intifada and the U.S. Media". Journal of Palestine Studies. 30 (2): 61–74. doi:10.1525/jps.2001.30.2.61. JSTOR 10.1525/jps.2001.30.2.61.
- Bar, Neta; Ben-Ari, Eyal (2005). "Israeli Snipers in the Al-Aqsa Intifada: Killing, Humanity and Lived Experience". Third World Quarterly. 26 (1): 133–152. doi:10.1080/0143659042000322955. JSTOR 3993768. S2CID 144521182.
- Bar-Tal, Daniel; Alon, Ilai (2017). "Sociopsychological approach to Trust (or Distrust): Concluding Comments". In Bar-Tal, Daniel (ed.). The Role of Trust in Conflict Resolution: The Israeli-Palestinian Case and Beyond. Springer. pp. 311–333. ISBN 978-3-319-43355-4. Archived from the original on April 14, 2024.
- Beeson, Patrick (2010). "Photojournalism". In Sloan, Wm David; Mackay, Jenn Burleson (eds.). Media Bias: Finding It, Fixing It. McFarland. pp. 184–198. ISBN 978-0-786-45505-8. Archived from the original on April 14, 2024.
- Beinin, Joel (2004). "The New McCarthyism: Policing Thought about the Middle East". Race & Class. 46 (1): 101–115. doi:10.1177/0306396804045517. S2CID 143636285.
- Ben-Naftali, Orna; Sfard, Michael; Viterbo, Hedi (2018). The ABC of the OPT: A Legal Lexicon of the Israeli Control over the Occupied Palestinian Territory. Cambridge University Press. ISBN 978-1-108-57846-2. Archived from the original on April 14, 2024.
- Bergman, Ronen (2018). Rise and Kill First: The Secret History of Israel's Targeted Assassinations. Random House. ISBN 978-0-679-60468-6. Archived from the original on March 3, 2023.
- Bishara, Amahl (August 2008). "Watching U.S. Television from the Palestinian Street: The Media, the State, and Representational Interventions". Cultural Anthropology. 23 (3): 488–530. doi:10.1111/j.1548-1360.2008.00016.x. JSTOR 20484514.
- Black, Ian (2017). Enemies and Neighbours: Arabs and Jews in Palestine and Israel, 1917-2017. Penguin UK. ISBN 978-0-241-00443-2. Archived from the original on April 14, 2024.
- Chorev, Harel (July 17, 2017). "Palestinian Social Media and Lone-Wolf Attacks: Subculture, Legitimization, and Epidemic". Terrorism and Political Violence. 29 (6): 1284–1306. doi:10.1080/09546553.2017.1341878. S2CID 149382710.
- Cramer, Philissa (May 14, 2021). "Dozens of US rabbinical students sign letter calling for American Jews to hold Israel accountable for its human rights abuses". Jewish Telegraphic Agency. Archived from the original on May 22, 2021.
- Daulatzai, Sohail (2016). Fifty Years of "The Battle of Algiers": Past as Prologue. University of Minnesota Press. ISBN 978-1-452-95445-5. Archived from the original on April 14, 2024.
- Dunsky, Marda (2008). Pens and Swords: How the American Mainstream Media Report the Israeli-Palestinian Conflict. Columbia University Press. ISBN 978-0-231-50826-1. Archived from the original on April 14, 2024.
- Esposito, Raffaele (2014). "Lexical wars: Hebrew euphemisms and dysphemisms in phrases relating to the Arab-Israeli conflict". Materia Giudaica. 19. Materia giudaica: rivista dell'associazione italiana per lo studio del giudaismo: 537–547. Archived from the original on October 28, 2023.
- Falk, Richard (1997). "Some International Law Implications of the Oslo/Cairo Framework for the PLO/Israeli Peace Process". In Bowen, Stephen (ed.). Human Rights, Self-Determination and Political Change in the Occupied Palestinian Territories. Martinus Nijhoff Publishers. pp. 1–34. ISBN 978-9-041-10502-8. Archived from the original on April 14, 2024.
- Findlay, Len (2010). "Academic and Artistic Freedom and the Israel-Palestine Conflict". Cultural and Pedagogical Inquiry. 2 (2): 5–18. doi:10.18733/c3pp4p. Archived from the original on March 7, 2024.
- Fisk, Robert (August 23, 2018). "Israel is building another 1,000 homes on Palestinian land. Where's the outrage?". The Independent. Archived from the original on December 22, 2019.
- Gerstenfeld, Manfred; Green, Ben (Fall 2004). "Watching the Pro-Israeli Media Watchers". Jewish Political Studies Review. 16 (3–4): 33–58. JSTOR 25834603.
- Groiss, Arnon; Shaked, Ronni (September 2017). Groiss, Arnon (ed.). Schoolbooks of the Palestinian Authority (PA): The Attitude to the Jews, to Israel and to Peace (PDF). Simon Wiesenthal Center. Archived (PDF) from the original on January 28, 2019.
- Hajjar, Lisa (2005). Courting Conflict: The Israeli Military Court System in the West Bank and Gaza. University of California Press. ISBN 978-0-520-24194-7. Archived from the original on March 7, 2024.
- Hoffnung, Menachem; Weinshall–Margel, Keren (2010). "Judicial Rejection as Substantial Relief: The Israeli Supreme Court and the "War on Terror"". In Volcansek, Mary L.; Stack, John F. (eds.). Courts and Terrorism: Nine Nations Balance Rights and Security. Cambridge University Press. pp. 150–167. ISBN 978-1-139-49537-0. Archived from the original on March 7, 2024.
- Hunt, Naomi, ed. (2013). Use With Care: A Reporter's Glossary of Loaded Language in the Israeli-Palestinian Conflict (PDF). International Press Institute. ISBN 978-3-9503007-9-6. Archived (PDF) from the original on December 9, 2023.
- Khalidi, Rashid (2013). Brokers of Deceit: How the U.S. Has Undermined Peace in the Middle East. Beacon Press. ISBN 978-0-807-04476-6. Archived from the original on April 14, 2024.
- Krishna, Sankaran (2009). Globalization and Postcolonialism: Hegemony and Resistance in the Twenty-first Century. Rowman & Littlefield. ISBN 978-0-742-55468-9.
- Kuntsman, Adi; Stein, Rebecca (2015). Digital militarism: Israel's occupation in the social media age. Stanford University Press. ISBN 978-0-804-79497-8. Archived from the original on March 7, 2024.
- Lange, Armin; Mayerhofer, Kerstin; Porat, Dina; Schiffman, Lawrence (2021). Comprehending Antisemitism through the Ages: A Historical Perspective. DeGruyter. doi:10.1515/9783110671995. ISBN 9783110671995. Archived from the original on February 15, 2024.
- Lionis, Chrisoula (2016). Laughter in Occupied Palestine: Comedy and Identity in Art and Film. I.B.Tauris. ISBN 978-1-784-53288-8. Archived from the original on April 14, 2024.
- Luft, Gal (Winter 2003). "The Logic of Israel's Targeted Killing". Middle East Quarterly. 10 (1). Archived from the original on August 15, 2018.
- Mearsheimer, John; Walt, Stephen (2007). The Israel Lobby and U.S. Foreign Policy. New York: Farrar, Straus and Giroux. ISBN 978-0-374-17772-0.
- Mendel, Yonatan (March 6, 2008). "Diary". London Review of Books. Vol. 30, no. 5. pp. 30–31. Archived from the original on November 27, 2019.
- Müller, Margret (2017). The World According To Israeli Newspapers: Representations of International Involvement in the Israeli-Palestinian Conflict. Frank & Timme. ISBN 978-3-732-90286-6. Archived from the original on April 14, 2024.
- Myre, Greg (August 25, 2002). "In Mideast Conflict, a War of Euphemisms". Los Angeles Times. Archived from the original on January 25, 2018.
- Peri, Yoram (2006). Generals in the Cabinet Room: How the Military Shapes Israeli Policy. United States Institute of Peace Press. ISBN 978-1-929-22381-7. Archived from the original on March 7, 2024.
- Perugini, Nicola (Spring 2014). "The Moral Economy of Settler Colonialism: Israel and the "Evacuation Trauma"" (PDF). History of the Present. 4 (1): 49–74. doi:10.5406/historypresent.4.1.0049. hdl:20.500.11820/f4047a5e-f019-4992-ae9a-4619205d79b8. JSTOR 10.5406/historypresent.4.1.0049. Archived (PDF) from the original on September 24, 2019.
- Peterson, Luke (2014). Palestine-Israel in the Print News Media: Contending Discourses. Routledge. ISBN 978-1-317-67036-0.
- Pilkington, Ed (May 21, 2021). "US campuses become a growing front in Israeli-Palestinian conflict". The Guardian. Archived from the original on November 2, 2021.
- Poole, Steven (2007). Unspeak: How Words Become Weapons, How Weapons Become a Message, and How That Message Becomes Reality. Grove Atlantic. ISBN 978-1-555-84872-9. Archived from the original on April 14, 2024.
- Richman, Jackson (May 24, 2018). "More than 60 organizations plead with colleges to protect Jewish students' civil rights". Washington Examiner. Archived from the original on April 21, 2019.
- Roy, Sara (Winter 2010). "Reflections on the Israeli-Palestinian Conflict in U.S. Public Discourse: Legitimizing Dissent". Journal of Palestine Studies. 39 (2): 23–38. doi:10.1525/jps.2010.xxxix.2.23. JSTOR 10.1525/jps.2010.xxxix.2.23.
- Shafir, Gershon (2017). A Half Century of Occupation: Israel, Palestine, and the World's Most Intractable Conflict. University of California Press. ISBN 978-0-520-29350-2. Archived from the original on March 7, 2024.
- Singh, Maanvi (May 21, 2021). "Outcry after Associated Press journalist fired amid row over pro-Palestinian views". The Guardian. Archived from the original on October 23, 2023.
- Stein, Rebecca L. (February 2017b). "GoPro Occupation: Networked Cameras, Israeli Military Rule, and the Digital Promise" (PDF). Current Anthropology. 58 (15): 556–564. Archived (PDF) from the original on March 22, 2020.
- Stern, Kenneth S. (2020). The Conflict Over the Conflict. University of Toronto Press. ISBN 978-1-487-53610-7. Archived from the original on October 28, 2023.
- Suleiman, Yasir (2004). A War of Words: Language and Conflict in the Middle East. Cambridge University Press. ISBN 978-0-521-54656-0. Archived from the original on April 14, 2024.
- Thrall, Nathan (2017). The Only Language They Understand: Forcing Compromise in Israel and Palestine. Henry Holt and Company. ISBN 978-1-627-79710-8. Archived from the original on April 14, 2024.
- Tiripelli, Giuliana (2016). Media and Peace in the Middle East: The Role of Journalism in Israel-Palestine. PalgraveMacmillan. ISBN 978-1-137-50401-2. Archived from the original on April 14, 2024.
- Vallone, R.P.; Ross, L.; Lepper, M.R. (1985). "The hostile media phenomenon: Biased Perception and Perceptions of Media Bias in Coverage of the "Beirut Massacre"" (PDF). Journal of Personality and Social Psychology. 49 (3): 577–585. doi:10.1037/0022-3514.49.3.577. PMID 4045697. Archived (PDF) from the original on May 16, 2021.
- Whitaker, Brian (April 9, 2001). "Israel wins war of words". The Guardian. Archived from the original on January 28, 2019.
- Zelizer, B. (2002). "How Bias Shapes the News: Challenging the New York Times' Status as a Newspaper of Record on the Middle East". Journalism: Theory, Practice & Criticism. 3 (3): 283–307. doi:10.1177/146488490200300305. S2CID 15153383. Archived from the original on August 14, 2021.
