= Relentless: The Struggle for Peace in the Middle East =

2003 film directed by Wayne Kopping & Brian K. Spector

- Directed by: Wayne Kopping; Brian K. Spector
- Written by: Wayne Kopping; Raphael Shore
- Produced by: Raphael Shore; Pael Siedman
- Edited by: Wayne Kopping; Brian Spector
- Release date: 2003
- Country: Israel
- Language: English

Relentless: The Struggle for Peace in the Middle East, also known as Relentless: The Struggle for Peace in Israel, is a 2003 documentary produced by the pro-Israel media watchdog group HonestReporting. The film explores the cause of the Second Intifada through an examination of compliance with the Declaration of Principles, otherwise known as the Oslo Accords, by Israel and the Palestinian Authority. It places the blame for the violence that ensued on the Palestinian Authority. It focuses, in particular, on the failure of the Palestinian Authority to "educate for peace," citing reports by Center for Monitoring the Impact of Peace on Textbooks in the Israeli–Palestinian conflict, by showing footage from Palestinian TV that encourages suicide bombing and preaches hatred of Jews and Israelis.

The film includes interviews with Itamar Marcus, the director of Palestinian Media Watch, S. El-Herfi, Raanan Gissin, Caroline Glick, John Loftus, Sherri Mandel, Yariv Oppenheimer, Daniel Pipes, Tashbih Sayyed and Natan Sharansky.

The film was produced and co-written by Raphael Shore, formerly the director of outreach for Aish HaTorah International. It is based on a PowerPoint presentation that Shore used as a study aid when he was teaching a political science course in Israel.

== Reception ==
Dan Pine reviewed the film in j., the Jewish news weekly of Northern California, describing it as sincere and gripping, however despite its making a convincing case against the Palestinian behavior and strategies, he still considered it propaganda.

== See also ==
- Pallywood
- Deception: Betraying the Peace Process
- Decryptage
- Peace, Propaganda, and the Promised Land
