= Décryptage =

2003 film by Philippe Bensoussan

- Directed by: Philippe Bensoussan
- Written by: Jacques Tarnero
- Release date: 2003
- Running time: 100 minutes
- Country: France
- Language: French

Décryptage is a 2003 documentary written by Jacques Tarnero and directed by Philippe Bensoussan. The French film (with English subtitles) examines media coverage of the Arab–Israeli conflict in the media of France, and concludes that the media's presentation of the Arab–Israeli conflict in France is consistently skewed against Israel and may be responsible for exacerbating antisemitism.

== Synopsis ==
The film criticizes media coverage of the Arab–Israeli conflict in the French press as biased in favor of the Palestinians, reviewing incidents such as the killing of Muhammad al-Durrah, the outbreak of the Second Intifada, and incitement in Palestinian society.

== Screenings ==
During its screening in Paris, attendees had to undergo a body search before entering for fear of an attack. The film was screened at the University of Minnesota on 30 November 2004 as part of a program examining perceptions of the Middle East conflict in France.

== Reviews ==
The film was reviewed in Le Devoir, Le Monde, and L'Humanité It was also reviewed by the Committee for Accuracy in Middle East Reporting in America

== See also ==
- Media coverage of the Arab-Israeli conflict
- Pallywood
- Peace, Propaganda, and the Promised Land
- Relentless: The Struggle for Peace in the Middle East
- Deception: Betraying the Peace Process
