= Pallywood =

Disinformation alleging Palestinian manipulation of media

- Origin: Portmanteau of "Palestine" and "Hollywood"
- Context: Used in discussions related to the Israeli–Palestinian conflict
- Coined by: Richard Landes
- Meaning: Derogatory label used to describe supposed media manipulation by Palestinians

Pallywood (a portmanteau of "Palestine" and "Hollywood") is a derogatory, anti-Palestinian term used to falsely accuse Palestinians of staging scenes of suffering and civilian death in the Israeli–Palestinian conflict. (Note: Multiple sources:) It has been described as a conspiracy theory and a prominent element of Israeli disinformation in the conflict. (Note: Sources describing Pallywood as a conspiracy theory:) Gazawood, a variant of the term, refers to similar footage originating in the Gaza Strip.

The term gained prominence following the 2000 killing of Muhammad al-Durrah during the Second Intifada, after some pro-Israel commentators alleged that the incident had been a media hoax. Israeli pundits have used the term to dismiss videos showing Israeli violence or deny Palestinian suffering, particularly during the Gaza war and the Gaza genocide.

== Origin ==
The term was coined and publicized in part by Richard Landes, as a result of a 2005 online documentary video he produced called Pallywood: According to Palestinian Sources, alleging specific instances of media manipulation. Journalist Ruthie Blum describes "Pallywood" as a term coined by Landes to refer to "productions staged by the Palestinians, in front of (and often with cooperation from) Western camera crews, for the purpose of promoting anti-Israel propaganda by disguising it as news." Landes himself describes Pallywood as "a term I coined... to describe staged material disguised as news."

In Pallywood: According to Palestinian Sources, Landes focuses in particular on the widely publicized killing of Muhammad al-Durrah, a 12-year-old Palestinian boy killed by gunfire (widely reported to have been Israeli gunfire) in the Gaza Strip on 30 September 2000 at the beginning of the Second Intifada. His death was filmed by a Palestinian freelance cameraman and aired on the France 2 television channel. Landes questions the authenticity of the footage and disputes whether al-Durrah was killed at all, arguing that the entire incident was staged by the Palestinians. Landes and pro-Israel advocates argue that the Israeli government is insufficiently robust in countering Palestinian accounts of events in the Israeli–Palestinian conflict. Besides the killing of al-Durrah, Landes cites the 2006 Gaza beach explosion and Hamas's alleged exploitation of electricity shortages during the 2007–2008 Israel–Gaza conflict as incidents of Pallywood.

== Subsequent usage ==
=== 2012–2025 ===
During the 2012 Gaza War, HonestReporting, a pro-Israel media monitoring organization, accused BBC News of broadcasting footage of an injured Palestinian man who was later shown walking around, calling it a case of Pallywood. A BBC spokesperson said in response, "The footage shown by BBC News was edited from a longer sequence provided by the Reuters news agency in which the man in question is shown being lifted from the ground. He is then given attention at the roadside, before appearing later having recovered. Steps have been taken to ensure any re-broadcast reflects the full sequence so that is absolutely clear to our audience." In 2015, HonestReporting published an article titled "On This Day: The Emergence of Al-Durrah and Pallywood", in which it cast doubt on the killing of Muhammad al-Durrah in 2000, during the Second Intifada.

David Frum alleged that pictures taken during the 2014 Gaza War that showed two brothers, weeping and wearing bloodied T-shirts after carrying the body of their dead father, had been faked. The pictures, which were published by Reuters, The New York Times, and Associated Press, had been targeted for criticism by a pro-Israeli blogger. Frum backtracked from his accusation, and apologized to New York Times photographer Sergey Ponomarev, after extensive debunking by Michael Shaw, but justified his "skepticism", describing other "Pallywood" claims. Frum was criticized by Washington Post media writer Erik Wemple, and also by fellow correspondent for The Atlantic, James Fallows, who called Frum's tweets "a major journalistic error".

In 2014, after the death of two Palestinian teenagers in Beitunia, Michael Oren and an Israeli army spokesman argued that the video from a security camera was manipulated and the teenagers had only pretended to be hit. The official investigation discovered misconduct by a Border Police officer, who was put on trial for his actions.

During the 2021 Israel–Palestine crisis, Yair Netanyahu claimed a 2013 video from Egypt was an example of Pallywood and showed Palestinians faking their casualties. A 2023 BBC Verify analysis found that usage of the term increased during previous flare-ups in the Israeli–Palestinian conflict, such as the 2014 Gaza War, the 2018–2019 Gaza border protests and the 2021 Israel–Palestine crisis. After the 2024 documentary film No Other Land, which depicts life under the Israeli occupation of the West Bank, won the 2025 Academy Award for Best Documentary Feature Film, Israeli news outlets Ynet and Israel National News published articles characterizing the film as "Pallywood propaganda".

=== Gaza war and genocide ===
Analyses conducted by BBC Verify and Logically Facts found that usage of the Pallywood term had increased on social media platforms following the October 7 attacks, with BBC Verify finding a peak of 220,000 uses on Twitter in November 2023. Logically Facts also found that most usages of the term came from the United States, followed by India and Israel. During the Gaza war, conspiracy theories involving online influencers mocking victims and claiming that Palestinians are using "crisis actors" went viral on social media, often citing the "Pallywood" term. Israel's official Twitter account accused Gazans of placing live people in body bags before deleting the Tweet, while AIPAC promoted similar content. Many of the viral videos used to "prove" that crisis actors exist have been disproven. The term often results in anti-Muslim hate speech and was especially popular after Israel announced plans to increase its aerial bombardment of Gaza. A video showing a Palestinian child killed during an October 11 Israeli airstrike on Zeitoun was falsely claimed to be staged using a doll. The claim was promoted by official Israeli government social media accounts, including the X accounts of Israel's embassies in France and Austria, as well as pro-Israel and anti-Hamas accounts.

In November 2023, Saleh al-Jafarawi, a Palestinian blogger and singer who lived in Gaza, was falsely accused by several pro-Israeli figures, including the country's official Twitter account, of being a "crisis actor". The false accusation claimed that al-Jafarawi pretended to be injured and hospitalised in a video while a social media post the next day showed him in good health. However, the included video actually depicted a Palestinian teenager wounded in a raid on Tulkarm in July 2023, who was falsely presented as al-Jafarawi. In the same month, Israeli diplomat Ofir Gendelman circulated a clip from a Lebanese short film, claiming that it was proof that Palestinians were faking their suffering and calling it an example of "Pallywood". Gendelman subsequently deleted the post after it was fact-checked. In early December 2023, The Jerusalem Post published an article falsely claiming that a dead 5-month-old Palestinian baby from Gaza was a doll. The Jerusalem Post later retracted the report with a statement on X, saying, "The article in question did not meet our editorial standards and was thus removed". The false claim was also promoted by others such as Israel's official Twitter account, Ben Shapiro, Hen Mazzig, Yoseph Haddad and StopAntisemitism.

Israel's 2024 Rafah offensive led to a resurgence of Pallywood claims. Online posts misrepresented behind-the-scenes footage from the Palestinian drama series Bleeding Dirt as showing "crisis actors" in Rafah. In 2025, Marc Owen Jones wrote in Third World Quarterly, "As Israel's killing of thousands of Palestinian children and babies became harder to hide, high-profile Israeli accounts and media outlets claimed that Palestinians were fabricating casualty numbers and staging the killing of babies. The so-called 'Pallywood' narrative – a derogatory term suggesting that Palestinians stage scenes of suffering for propaganda purposes – has been a recurring theme in disinformation campaigns against Gaza." Jones also characterized US president Joe Biden saying in October 2023 that he had "no confidence in the number [of deaths] that the Palestinians are using" as reinforcing the Pallywood narrative.

In August 2025, German newspapers Bild and Süddeutsche Zeitung published articles questioning the authenticity of photos from the Gaza Strip, with Bild accusing Anas Zayed Fteiha, a photojournalist working for Turkey's Anadolu Agency, of staging his photos of the Gaza Strip famine. The articles were cited by Israel's Ministry of Foreign Affairs as evidence of Pallywood. Fteiha denied the accusations and accused Bild of repeated breaches of journalistic ethics. He stated, "The photo they published to distort me is entirely real. It was taken during the filming of a documentary documenting the famine in Gaza, as children were scrambling for food or water. Everything in it was real, not staged or directed." The claims made in the Bild report were debunked by the Israeli fact-checking organization FakeReporter and the French newspaper Libération.

Also in August 2025, sociologist Ron Dudai analysed the widespread denial among Israelis of Israeli atrocities in the Gaza war as being a part of the longstanding Pallywood strategy, noting that while in earlier iterations it consisted of elaborate work to create conspiracy theories to deny atrocities as in the case of Muhammad Al-Durrah, in the Gaza War era, "the intricate conspiracy theories of the past have given way to a cruder form of denialism that scholars call conspiracism — the reflexive dismissal of any evidence that contradicts one's interests as fabricated. Documentation is simply dismissed with a single word: 'Fake'." He notes the examples of the denialism about mass starvation and what he terms the ongoing Gaza genocide, stating:

Israel's ongoing genocidal campaign in Gaza may be the most thoroughly documented atrocity in recent history, measured both by the sheer volume of evidence and the speed of its circulation. Smartphones and social media — which were still a world away during the genocides in Bosnia and Rwanda — allow events to be captured instantly, from countless angles, and shared globally in real time, with traditional media still playing a not-insignificant supporting role. And yet, faced with an unending flood of photos and videos of dead civilians, starving children, and entire neighborhoods reduced to rubble, much of the Israeli public — and a significant portion of Israel's supporters abroad — responds in one of two ways: either it is all fake, or else the Gazans deserved it. Often, paradoxically, it is both at once: "There are no dead children in Gaza, and it's good that we killed them."

==== Gazawood account ====
An Israeli Twitter account named Gazawood was created in November 2023. The account attempts to discredit Palestinians by claiming that they are exaggerating or faking their casualties, and uses out-of-context videos of cafés and restaurants that are not actually located in Gaza to insinuate that the Gaza Strip famine is a hoax. FakeReporter researcher and OSINT specialist Ghassan Mattar stated, "Only around 5.75% of its content is actual debunking or fact-checking. The other content is just finding the most ridiculous information inside the video to claim it's fake, which is not how fact-checking works." Reporters Without Borders reported that the Gazawood term has been used as a pretext to discredit the credibility of Palestinian journalists reporting from the Gaza Strip.

An investigation of the Gazawood account by Forbidden Stories, The Seventh Eye and Radio France Internationale found that it is run by Idan Knochen, an ultra-Orthodox Jew and fantasy novel author from Jerusalem. Richard Landes and Yossi Kuperwasser, former Director General of Israel's Ministry of Strategic Affairs, were also identified as being associated with the Gazawood account. FakeReporter's investigation of the account found that it is being fed content by a Telegram group with 30 members, some of whom have close ties to Israeli far-right figures.

== Analysis ==
Ruthie Blum wrote in 2008 that Richard Landes's claims, which she calls "pretty harsh", have led to him being labeled as a right-wing conspiracy theorist in certain circles. Chrisoula Lionis writes that Landes's language related to Pallywood "has all the hallmarks of conspiracy theory", but that the term nonetheless "does tap into a genre of Palestinian victim reportage", which T. J. Demos calls "clichéd and thus all too easily dismissed ... intended both to expose the truth of the traumatic suffering that has resulted from Israel's political and military policies and to elicit the audience's emotional sympathy as a way of mobilizing support for Palestinians".

In 2014, Larry Derfner described Pallywood in +972 Magazine as "a particularly ugly ethnic slur". In 2018, Eyal Weizman, whose work with Forensic Architecture has been called "Pallywood" in Israel, replied that "the bastards' last line of defence is to call it 'fake news'. The minute they revert to this argument is when they've lost all the others." In an article published by Mondoweiss, Jonathan Cook argued that "Pallywood" was a convenient excuse used by Israelis to dismiss filmed evidence of brutality by their soldiers. In 2023, Muhammad Idrees Ahmad, Director of Journalism at the University of Essex, said that "cynical actors" misrepresenting footage from the Syrian civil war as being from the Gaza war "are handing a gift to the Hasbara crowd. The fact that they are posting this out-of-context footage is being used to suggest that all the footage online, including footage of real atrocities in Gaza, is somehow dubious."

In 2024, French historian Jean-Pierre Filiu compared Pallywood claims of staged deaths to "the lies spread by the Kremlin when Russia struck a maternity hospital in March 2022 in the besieged Ukrainian port of Mariupol." Marc Owen Jones wrote that Pallywood "served to cast doubt on any evidence of Israeli attacks on civilians, framing such reports as manipulations or fabrications. By discrediting Palestinian voices and visual evidence, this narrative undermines the legitimacy of Palestinian grievances and attempts to shield Israeli actions from international scrutiny." In 2025, journalist Laila Al-Arian said that Pallywood was no more credible than the crisis actor conspiracy theories used to dismiss mass shootings in the United States, and said, "If you paint Palestinians as irrational, obsessed with martyrdom, you shift the conversation away from settler colonialism, land theft, ethnic cleansing."

== See also ==
- Deception: Betraying the Peace Process
- Décryptage
- Peace, Propaganda & the Promised Land
- Hasbara
- Media coverage of the Israeli–Palestinian conflict
- Relentless: The Struggle for Peace in the Middle East
- The Road to Jenin
