= Leiss =

Leiss (German: Leiß; also spelled Liess or Ließ or Leis) is a surname of German origin.

It may refer to:

- William Leiss (born 1939)– academic; former president of the Royal Society of Canada (1999-2001)

Leiss, pronounced: (Leece)
