= Jean-Pierre Wallot =

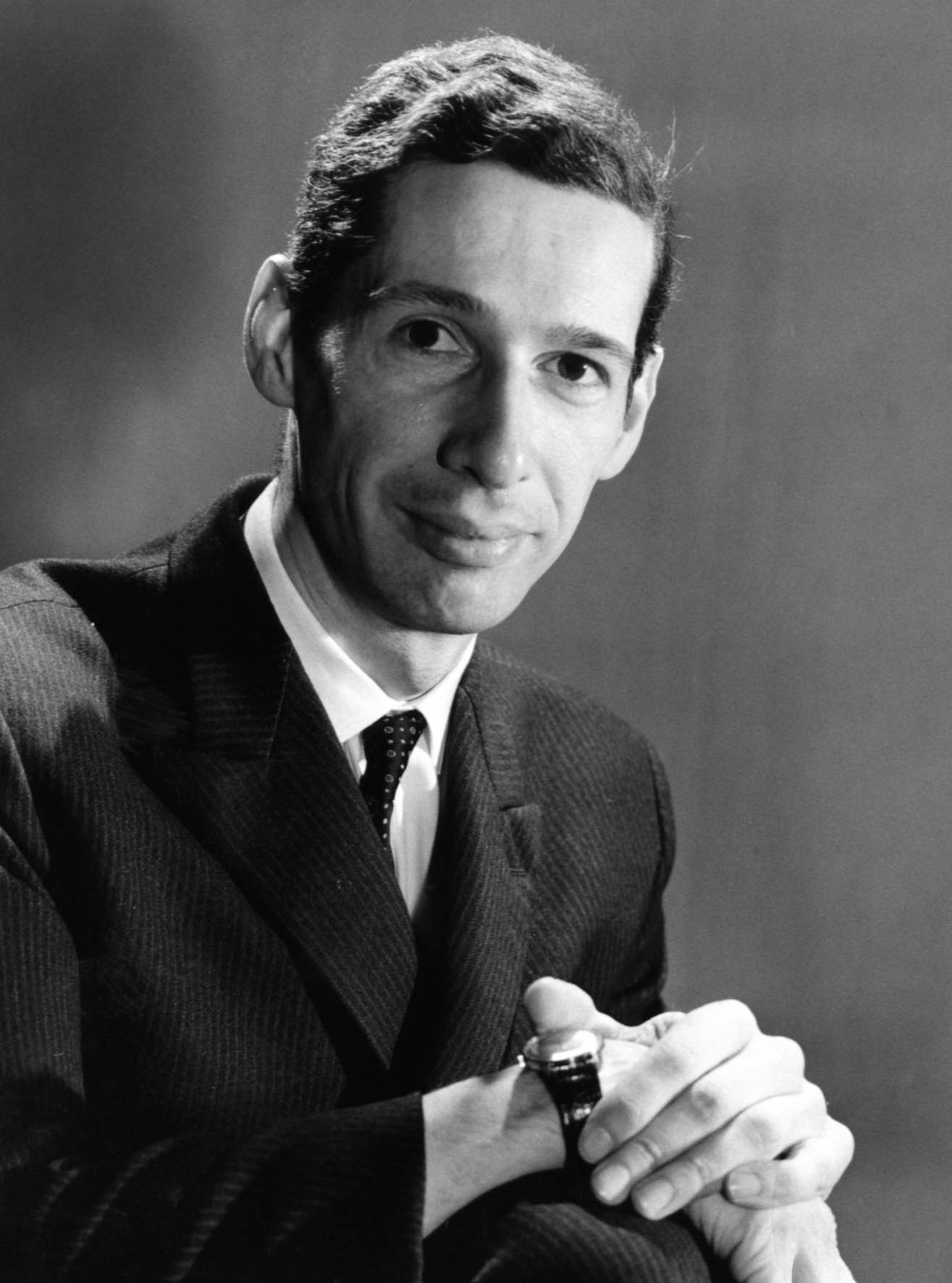
- Wallot in 1968
- Born: May 22, 1935; Salaberry-de-Valleyfield, Quebec, Canada
- Died: August 30, 2010 (aged 75); Ottawa, Ontario, Canada
- Title: President of the Royal Society of Canada
- Term: 1997–1999
- Predecessor: Robert Haynes
- Successor: William Leiss

Jean-Pierre Wallot OC FRSC (May 22, 1935 – August 30, 2010) was a Canadian historian, educator, civil servant and former National Archivist of Canada.

Born in Salaberry-de-Valleyfield, Quebec, he graduated from the Université de Montréal in 1954. He also received a Master's and Doctorate from the same university. Wallot worked as a journalist from 1954 to 1960. From 1966 to 1969, he was a historian with the National Museum of Man in Ottawa. He has held a number of senior administrative positions at the Université de Montréal including Chairman, Department of History (1973–1975), Vice-Dean Studies (1975–1978) and Vice-Dean Research (1979–1982) in the Faculty of Arts and Sciences, and Vice-President Academic (1982–1985). From 1985 until 1997, he was National Archivist and from 1993-1998 served as the first chairperson of UNESCO's Memory of the World Programme.

He was elected a Fellow of the Royal Society of Canada in 1978 and served as the President from 1997 to 1999.

In 1991, he was made an Officer of the Order of Canada.

Professional and academic associations
Preceded by Robert Haynes	President of the Royal Society of Canada; 1997–1999	Succeeded by William Leiss
