= Robert Haynes (geneticist) =

Canadian geneticist and biophysicist (1931-1998)

Robert Haynes OC, FRSC
- Born: 27 August 1931; London, Ontario, Canada
- Died: 22 December 1998 (aged 67)
- Education: University of Western Ontario
- Known for: Study of DNA repair and mutagenesis
- Awards: Order of Canada
- Scientific career
- Fields: Genetics, biophysics
- Institutions: York University, Toronto

Robert Hall Haynes, OC, FRSC (27 August 1931 – 22 December 1998) was a Canadian geneticist and biophysicist. He was the Distinguished Research Professor in the Department of Biology at York University. Haynes was best known for his contributions to the study of DNA repair and mutagenesis, and for helping promote the concept of terraforming through his invention of the term, ecopoiesis.

Haynes was one of the earliest geneticists to recognize the fundamental biological importance of the vulnerability of DNA to damage and therefore the central role of DNA repair processes. As he noted, “DNA is composed of rather ordinary molecular subunits, which certainly are not endowed with any peculiar kind of quantum mechanical stability. Its very chemical vulgarity makes it prey to all the chemical horrors and misfortune that might befall any such molecule in a warm aqueous medium.”

Haynes early life and scientific contributions have been summarized by Kunz et al. (1993) and Kunz and Hanawalt (1999).

== Incomplete timeline ==
- 1953, Haynes receives a degree in Mathematics and Physics, at the University of Western Ontario.
- 1957, Ph.D. in Biophysics, UWO
- 1984, Haynes creates the word ecopoiesis, a term that came to be widely used by writers and some proponents of terraforming and space exploration.
- 1987, The Genetics Society of Canada creates the Robert H. Haynes Young Scientist Award.
- 1988, Haynes serves as President of the 16th International Congress of Genetics.
- 1990, He is made an Officer of the Order of Canada.
- 1995 Haynes becomes the 104th President of the Royal Society of Canada

== Selected publications ==
=== Presidential Address ===
- Haynes, R.H. (1989). "Genetics and the unity of Biology". Genome. Vol. 31. pp. 1–7. doi:10.1139/g89-004. PMID 2687084.

=== Planetary engineering ===
- Haynes, R.H. (1989). "Prospects for Establishing a Microbial Ecosystem on Mars". Biotechnology on the Threshold of the XXI Century. Moscow. pp. 85–88.
- McKay, CP; Haynes, RH (December 1990), "Essay: should we implant life on Mars?", Scientific American, 263 (6): 144, doi:10.1038/scientificamerican1290-144, PMID 11536477
- Haynes, RH (1990), Ecce Ecopoiesis: Playing God on Mars in MacNiven, D. (1990-07-13). Moral Expertise: studies in practical and professional ethics. Routledge. pp. 161–163. ISBN 0-415-03576-7.
- Haynes, Robert H. (1990) Etablierung von Leben auf dem Mars durch gerichtete Panspermie: Technische und ethische Probleme der Okopoese," Biol. Zent. bl. 109. 193-205.
- McKay, CP; Haynes, RH (1992), "The Implantation of Life on Mars: Feasibility and Motivation", Advances in Space Research, 12 (4): 133–140, Bibcode:1992AdSpR..12..133H, doi:10.1016/0273-1177(92)90167-V, PMID 11538133
- Haynes, Robert. (1993) How Mars Might Become a Home for Humans. The Illustrated Encyclopedia of Mankind.

Professional and academic associations
Preceded by John Meisel	President of the Royal Society of Canada; 1995–1997	Succeeded by Jean-Pierre Wallot
