= Sut Jhally =

Film director and producer (born 1955)

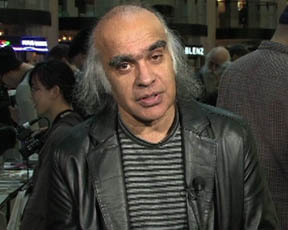
- Jhally in Vancouver, 2013
- Born: 1955 (age 70–71); Kenya
- Education: University of York (BA, MA); University of Victoria (MA); Simon Fraser University (PhD)
- Occupation: Professor of communication
- Employer: University of Massachusetts Amherst
- Known for: Founder of the Media Education Foundation

Sut Jhally (born 1955) is a professor of communication at the University of Massachusetts Amherst, whose work focuses on cultural studies, advertising, media, and consumption. He is the producer of more than 40 documentaries on media literacy topics and the founder and executive director of the Media Education Foundation.

Established in 1992, the Media Education Foundation is a non-profit that "produces and distributes documentary films and other educational resources to inspire critical reflection on the social, political, and cultural impact of American mass media". Their aim is to inspire students to think critically and in new ways about the hyper-mediated world around them.

Jhally was born in Kenya, and raised in England. On completing his undergraduate work at the University of York in England, he moved to Canada after accepting a scholarship to the University of Victoria. He continued his studies at Simon Fraser University, where he received his PhD.

Jhally began his career in the Department of Communication at the University of Massachusetts Amherst in 1985. At the university, Jhally was an undergraduate and graduate professor for 35 years until retirement in 2020. Jhally taught courses examining advertising, gender, race, sex, media, public relations and propaganda. Jhally’s legacy at University of Massachusetts, Amherst was celebrated through winning the Distinguished Teacher Award and named “Best Professor” by the student newspaper, The Daily Collegian. In 1992, he was named one of New Woman magazine's "People of the Year". Jhally is currently retired but stated he intends to remain active on the campus.

Jhally, in a speech from 2010 on the threat of advertising, states that "advertising is the most powerful and sustained system of propaganda in human history and its cumulative cultural and political effects unless very quickly checked will be responsible for destroying the world as we know it. In the process of achieving this the masters of the advertising system, global corporations bent on nothing but private profits, will be responsible for the deaths of millions of people, mostly non-Western. In addition the peoples of the world will be prevented from achieving true happiness. Simply stated our survival as a species is dependent upon minimizing the threat from advertising and the commercial culture that has spawned it."

== Works ==
Jhally’s work is often focused on pop culture and media, advertising, culture, and politics. Jhally’s work includes editing or writing books, published scholarly articles, and production of educational documentaries examining the influence of mass media. These works address issues of gender, race, sexuality, political representation, and commercialism.

In his 1991 video Dreamworlds, he describes the image of women in music videos as male adolescent fantasies: young and pretty, willing and eager to please men, saying no when meaning yes, often reduced to outward appearances and body parts. He concludes that an unhealthy attitude towards sexual violence can be fostered by these videos, and calls for balancing them with other cultural representations of sexuality. When MTV complained about his use of parts of copyrighted music videos, he claimed fair use and contacted the media about the story.

In the 2004 video Peace, Propaganda & the Promised Land, he attempts to establish the influence of Israeli propaganda and PR on the United States public opinion regarding the Israeli–Palestinian conflict.

In the 2004 video Hijacking Catastrophe, he argues that the "war on terror" has been used by U.S. officials as a pretext to project military power across the world.

In his 2006 video Reel Bad Arabs, he explores the vilification of Arabs in American cinema, following Jack Shaheen's 2001 book Reel Bad Arabs.

=== Criticism ===
Jhally's documentaries and academic work have started scholarly discussion, including criticism of his approach to media representation and analysis.

In 1994, Sut Jhally and Justin Lewis's book Enlightened Racism was responded to by Herman Gray. Gray agreed with Jhally’s of racial representation in The Cosby Show, but argued that further examination needed to be done on how the audiences are differently interpreting race and class for a more efficient discussion. Gray also argued for a larger analysis considering the viewer's responses to racial messaging in television programs.

In 2001, Patricia Anne Ryden published her doctoral dissertation, Fighting Fire with Fire: An Analysis of Critical Media Literacy Videos. This dissertation examined the rhetorical strategies in Jhally's Dreamworlds. Ryden argued that Jhally’s usage of a male narrator and images of sexualized women in the film could’ve had unintended effects on female viewers. Ryden acknowledged the documentary's positive reception among the film's viewers, but argued that its approach could create an alienating viewing experience for some female students.

In 2011, Jhally’s The Codes of Gender, was reviewed by Wynn Yarbrough. Yarbrough praised Jhally's analysis of gender representation in advertising but noted several limitations throughout the film. Yarbrough argued that the film draws heavily on the work of sociologist Erving Goffman, and his book Gender Advertisements (1979). Yarbrough points out that Jhally could have incorporated other gender and cultural theorists. Despite these criticisms, Yarbrough recommended the documentary as a useful resource for teaching and studying gender.

Laurie Meeker of Evergreen State College criticized Sut's Dreamworlds for "failing to draw attention to his own manipulations of the medium" of rock video.

=== Video documentaries ===
- Pack of Lies – the Advertising of Tobacco (with Jean Kilbourne) (1992)
- The Killing Screens (with George Gerbner) (1994)
- The Date Rape Backlash (1994)
- Slim Hopes (with Jean Kilbourne) (1995)
- Dreamworlds II: Desire, Sex, Power in Music Video (1997)
- Advertising and the End of the World (1998)
- Off the Straight and Narrow (with Katherine Sender) (1998)
- Tough Guise: Men, Violence and the Crisis in Masculinity (with Jackson Katz), (1999)
- Killing Us Softly 3 (with Jean Kilbourne), (1999)
- Wrestling with Manhood: Boys, Bullying & Battering (with Jackson Katz), (2002)
- No Logo (2003), based on Naomi Klein's book No Logo
- Playing UnFair, The Media Image of the Female Athlete (2003)
- Hijacking Catastrophe: 9/11, Fear & the Selling of American Empire (with Jeremy Earp), (2004)
- Peace, Propaganda & the Promised Land (with Bathsheba Ratzkoff), (2004)
- Reel Bad Arabs: How Hollywood Vilifies a People (2006), based on Jack Shaheen's 2001 book Reel Bad Arabs
- Dreamworlds 3: Desire, Sex & Power in Music Video (2007)
- This Land Is Our Land (with Jeremy Earp) (2010)
- The Codes of Gender (2010)
- Flirting with Danger: Power & Choice in Heterosexual Relationships (with Andrew Killoy), (2012)
- The Occupation of the American Mind: Israel's Public Relations War in the United States (2016)
- Advertising at the Edge of the Apocalypse (2017)
- Atrocity Inc: How Israel Sells its Destruction of Gaza (with Max Blumenthal) (2024)

=== Books ===
- Cultural Politics in Contemporary America, edited by Ian H. Angus and Sut Jhally (Routledge, 1988), ISBN 0-415-90010-7
- Enlightened Racism (with Justin Lewis), (1992), ISBN 0-8133-1419-4. Argues that The Cosby Show reinforced the myth that Blacks who don't "make it" have only themselves to blame.
- The Codes of Advertising (1999), ISBN 0-415-90353-X
- Social Communication in Advertising (with William Leiss, Stephen Kline, and Jacqueline Botterill), (2004), ISBN 0-415-96676-0
- The Spectacle of Accumulation: essays in culture, media, & politics, (2006), ISBN 0-8204-7904-7

=== Articles ===
- "Advertising at the Edge of the Apocalypse", in: Robin Andersen and Lance Strate (eds), Critical studies in media commercialism, New York, 2000
