= Ian Angus (philosopher) =

Canadian philosopher (born 1949)

- Born: 18 April 1949 (age 77); London, England, United Kingdom

Academic background
- Education: University of Waterloo (MA); York University (PhD)
- Thesis: Technique and Enlightenment: Limits of Instrumental Reason in the Life-World (1980)
- Doctoral advisor: William Leiss

Academic work
- Discipline: Philosophy
- School or tradition: Phenomenological Marxism
- Institutions: Simon Fraser University

Ian Henderson Angus (born 18 April 1949) is an interdisciplinary philosopher and social critic who writes on continental philosophy, Canadian studies, communication theory, social movements, ecological thought, and the university.

== Education ==
Angus was born on 18 April 1949 in London, England. He holds Bachelor of Arts and Master of Arts degrees in philosophy from the University of Waterloo and a Doctor of Philosophy degree in social and political thought from York University (1980). He has taught at the University of New Hampshire, Trent University, and University of Massachusetts at Amherst (1986–1992) and is currently a professor in the Department of Humanities at Simon Fraser University in British Columbia, Canada.

== Work ==
=== Continental philosophy ===
Angus's early intellectual formation began with a dual engagement with 20th-century phenomenology, particularly the work of Edmund Husserl, and the Frankfurt school of critical theory around the problems of technology and modern capitalism. Focusing on the notion of "instrumental reason" as a legitimating principle of technology, his first book Technique and Enlightenment (1984) argues for a form of technological assessment that is both ethical and acknowledges its role within the larger problematic of the construction of human identity. His subsequent work branched into a wider conception of the problem of modernity in critical engagement with discourse theory, post-structuralism, and rhetorical theory. In Primal Scenes of Communication (2000) "the complex linguistic model Angus has created regards the immanent link of identity creation involved in communication theories, but ... his concerns deal with this struggle for, and the shaping of, our faculties of attention." In his 2021 volume Groundwork of Phenomenological Marxism, Angus clearly explicates Edmund Husserl's phenomenological theory, in particular as articulated in The Crisis of European Sciences and Transcendental Phenomenology, in conjunction with that aspect of the Marxist heritage rooted in the phenomena of human labor, and arrives at an ecological perspective on contemporary emancipatory scientific endeavor.

=== Canadian social philosophy ===
Angus's commitment to Canadian social and political thought was a consequence of his estimation in the 1970s that the left wing of Canadian nationalism contained the possibility for a transformation of Canadian society in a more egalitarian direction. In his most influential book in the area of Canadian studies, A Border Within (1997), he works toward thinking English Canadian identity in relation to internal diversity and environmental-local embeddedness. He does so by exploring the question: "What are the possibilities for an English-Canadian national identity in an age of corporate globalization—a phenomenon that appears to undermine national identities around the world?" Angus rejects the tendency to wholly situate identity as simply constructed locally or universally, but instead maintains that it is in the very acknowledgement of otherness, both environmental and ethnic, that an English Canadian identity could be rethought. His subsequent book Identity and Justice (2008) traces political thought and cultural politics insofar as they are integrated into philosophy. "It is not a book about Canadian philosophy, but rather a philosophical book that self-consciously situates itself in a particular place, in order to talk about this place." In 2013, Angus published a collection of essays on Canada under the title The Undiscovered Country: Essays in Canadian Intellectual Culture through Athabasca University Press in which he collected together his critiques of Canadian thinkers and emphasized that a philosophy which does not criticize empire becomes ideology.

=== Love the Questions ===
Angus's work on the university draws on years of activism and public deliberation on the issues surrounding it. He applies philosophical critique on an institutional level. This allows him to examine the transformation of knowledge as it relates to the external pressures of network capitalism and technoscience. The contemporary university can be defined by "three separate questions focusing on teaching, research and application, and technological change." Maria Victoria Guglietti's review explains that "the transmission of knowledge ... undermines enlightenment because it discourages any enquiry into the nature and limits of knowledge." This amounts to the university losing its "critical and self reflexive role" because its main purpose is to feed the specific needs of the larger system. This corporate arrangement of the university produces an anxiety as it relates to self-knowledge because of the explicit integration of education into the commodity form. Angus concludes with a realistic but hopeful analysis of the possibilities for the construction of new forms of enlightenment within the university. Though his work is primarily on the Canadian university, it has been widely praised for its applicability to the situation in the UK and US.

== Books ==
- Metabolic Rifts: Capitalism's Assault on the Earth System (Monthly Review Press, 2026)
- Groundwork of Phenomenological Marxism: Crisis, Body, World (Lexington Books, 2021)
- The Undiscovered Country: Essays in Canadian Intellectual Culture (Athabasca University Press, 2013)
- Love the Questions: University Education and Enlightenment (Arbeiter Ring, 2009)
- Identity and Justice (University of Toronto Press, 2008)
- Emergent Publics: An Essay on Social Movements and Democracy (Arbeiter Ring, 2001)
- Anarcho-Modernism: Toward a New Critical Theory. In Honour of Jerry Zaslove (Editor, Talonbooks, 2001)
- (Dis)figurations: Discourse/Critique/Ethics (Verso, 2000)
- Primal Scenes of Communication: Communication, Consumerism, Social Movements (SUNY Press, 2000)
- A Border Within: National Identity, Cultural Plurality and Wilderness (McGill Queen's Press, 1997)
- The Critical Turn: Rhetoric and Philosophy in Postmodern Discourse (Co edited with Lenore Langsdorf, Southern Illinois University Press, 1993)
- Cultural Politics in Contemporary America (Co edited with Sut Jhally, New York: Routledge, 1989), ISBN 0-415-90010-7
- Ethnicity in a Technological Age (Editor, Edmonton: Canadian Institute of Ukrainian Studies, 1988).
- George Grant's Platonic Rejoinder to Heidegger: Contemporary Political Philosophy and the Question of Technology (Edwin Mellen Press, 1988)
- Technique and Enlightenment: Limits of Instrumental Reason (Centre for Advanced Research in Phenomenology & University Press of America, 1984)
