= Jennifer Griffin =

American journalist

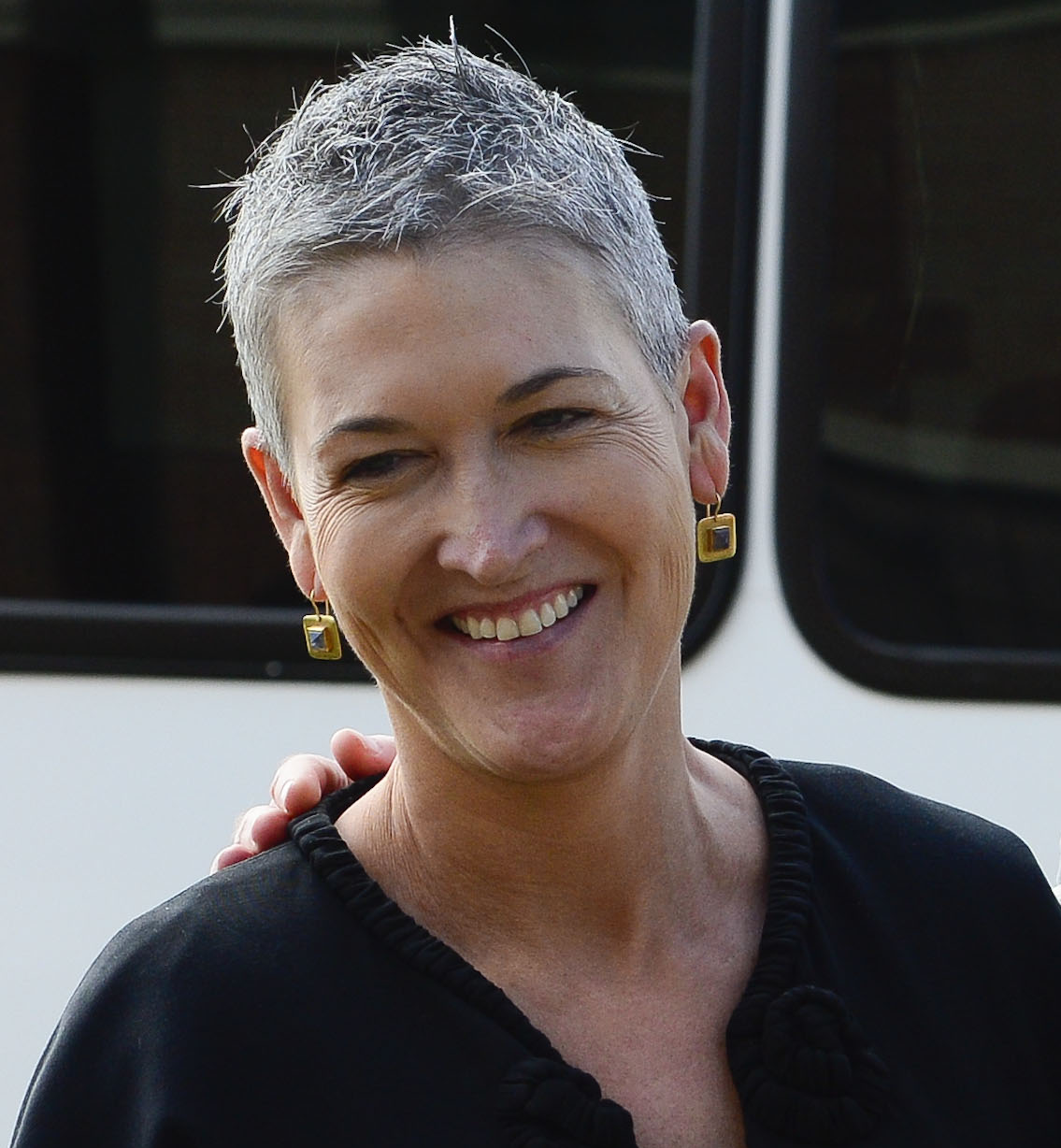
- Griffin at Langley Air Force Base
- Education: Harvard University (BA)
- Occupation: Journalist
- Notable credit: Fox News
- Spouse: Greg Myre
- Children: 3

Jennifer Griffin is an American journalist who works as Chief national security correspondent at the Pentagon for Fox News. She joined Fox News in October 1999 as a Jerusalem-based correspondent. Prior to the posting, she reported for three years from Moscow for Fox News.

Since 2007, Griffin has reported daily from the Pentagon where she questions senior military leaders, travels to war zones with the Joint Chiefs and Secretaries of Defense, and reports on all aspects of the military. Griffin coauthored This Burning Land: Lessons from the Front Lines of the Transformed Israeli-Palestinian Conflict with her husband.

== Career ==
Before working at the Pentagon, Griffin was based in Jerusalem, and provided coverage of the Second Palestinian Intifada, suicide bombings, military incursions and failed peace deals. In 2000, she provided on-site coverage of Israel's withdrawal from Lebanon, its withdrawal from the Gaza strip in 2005 and Yasser Arafat's funeral. In 2006, Griffin conducted a rare interview with former Prime Minister of Israel Ariel Sharon before he lapsed into a coma.

In 2004, Griffin was among the first reporters to arrive in the wake of the South-East Asia tsunami tragedy, reporting from Phuket and Khao Lak, Thailand.

After college, Griffin reported for The Sowetan newspaper in Johannesburg, South Africa, where she covered Nelson Mandela's prison release and South Africa's transition from apartheid.

In October 2019, Griffin fact-checked President Donald Trump after he claimed the U.S. never gave a commitment to the Kurds. In response, Griffin tweeted “Not true. According to a former top senior military adviser to President Trump, ‘We told them over and over ‘We are your friends. We will never leave you."

In September 2020, Griffin, citing anonymous sources, confirmed some key details of an article in The Atlantic but was unable to confirm the part of that story that reported President Trump had characterized veterans and fallen American soldiers as "losers" and "suckers." The report had been previously confirmed by the Associated Press and The Washington Post. Trump and several aides who said they were present at the time denied the report, with the president and others calling for Griffin to resign. Numerous reporters, including some from Fox News, defended Griffin's integrity and reporting. She stood by her report, characterizing her sources as "unimpeachable."

In February 2022, prior and just after the start of the Russian Invasion of Ukraine Griffin frequently corrected and fact-checked her Fox News colleagues when they said false or unproven things about the war. When asked why she felt it necessary to correct these statements she said "I’ve been part of the news division since those beginning days. I’m here to fact-check facts because I report on facts,. “And my job is to try and figure out the truth as best as I know it. I share those facts internally, so that our network can be more accurate. That’s what I’ve always done.” In September 2022, Griffin inked a new multi-year deal with Fox News. In addition to this new contract she was also promoted to Chief National Security correspondent. This new promotion comes after she traveled to Lviv and Kyiv, Ukraine covering Russia's invasion. Griffin also secured exclusive interviews with top officials, including Foreign Minister Dmytro Kuleba and United States Secretary of Defense Lloyd Austin, and spearheaded FNC's coverage of the conflict stateside with around the clock updates from the Pentagon.

Griffin is a recipient of the Washington DC based Transatlantic Leadership Network "Freedom of the Media" Gold Medal award for Public Service, awarded to a US news organization or individual for their extraordinary contribution and excellence in foreign affairs journalism.

In a 2025 Pentagon news conference, Secretary of Defense Pete Hegseth criticized her for allegedly intentionally misrepresenting what the president says in her reporting on the U.S. bombing of Iran’s nuclear facilities.

== Supporting veterans ==
As National Security Correspondent as the Pentagon, Griffin has supported veterans through numerous organizations and events. In 2021, Griffin assisted The Independence Fund with giving away the 2,500th Track Chair to a wounded warrior veteran.

For the past decade, Griffin has hosted the Wounded Warrior Experience, which features inspiring stories of sacrifice and recovery from wounded veterans and service members. The program touches on issues faced by wounded warriors, the resources available to them, and their successes in moving forward in their lives. The program highlights the importance of aiding America's heroes during their transition from military to civilian life.

Griffin serves as the emcee of the annual CAUSE gala, which celebrates and shows our appreciation for America's wounded, ill, and injured service members and their caregivers.

Griffin has emceed the Henry M. Jackson Foundation for the Advancement of Military Medicine's Heroes of Military Medicine Awards each year since 2013 as of 2024.

Griffin is a member of the board of directors for the Prevent Cancer Foundation and an Advisory Board Member for Report for America.

== Breast cancer ==
Griffin was diagnosed with stage 3 triple-negative breast cancer in 2009, and underwent chemotherapy, a double mastectomy, and radiation for treatment. She was declared in remission in 2010. Griffin's story has been featured on the Today show, People magazine, and Oprah.com.

== Personal life ==
Griffin is the daughter of John W. Griffin, a partner in a Washington, D.C. law firm, and Carolyn J. Griffin, the producing director of Metrostage, a theater in Alexandria, Virginia.

A 1992 graduate of Harvard University, Griffin has a bachelor's degree in comparative politics.

In October 1994, Griffin married Greg Myre, a journalist who is NPR's national security correspondent and has reported for the Associated Press and The New York Times. The couple met at a political rally in a sports stadium in South Africa, on October 29, 1989. Griffin was a college student at Harvard, working for The Sowetan newspaper while Myre was a staff correspondent with the Associated Press. Griffin and Myre have three children.
