= The Codes of Gender =

2010 documentary film dir. Sut Jhally

- Directed by: Aaron Vega, Andrew Killoy, Jeremy Earp, Sut Jhally
- Written by: Sut Jhally
- Distributed by: Media Education Foundation
- Release date: 2010

The Codes of Gender is a 2010 documentary written and directed by Sut Jhally, a professor of communications at the University of Massachusetts Amherst. The film investigates how advertising goes beyond the selling of product, but also the selling of social ideas; particularly through gender representations. Jhally connects these ideas to the work of symbolic interactionism established by the late Erving Goffman, a Canadian-born sociologist. The film visually demonstrates the ways in which gender is performed, the social construction of femininity and masculinity and how gender can intersect with power.

== Synopsis ==
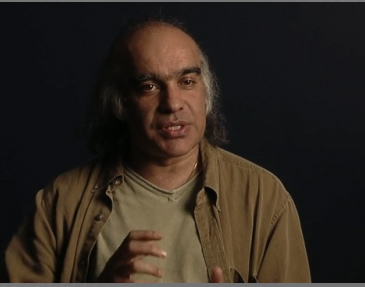
Writer and Director of The Codes of Gender Sut Jhally

The documentary explores gendered advertising through the patterns of gender-specific poses that are displayed through advertising and relates it to popular culture by analyzing how society constructs these categories for individuals to adhere to. This pattern is further examined and related to Erving Goffman's declaration that the ways in which individuals are positioned through advertising, reinforces society's cliché ideologies of masculinity and femininity. The film begins by presenting a series of clips such as "Boys don't cry" and "The O'Reilly Factor" that exemplifies our ability to acknowledge whether an individual is male or female. Jhally claims that being able to carry on further social interaction heavily depends on being able to identify an individual's gender.

Jhally emphasizes throughout the film that mass media can often be identified as the intermediary. Individuals do not immediately understand a message once they view it, this is done through social knowledge. Therefore, the burden is placed upon the media to deliver messages that can be easily encoded by their audience members. This is often done by depicting commonly understood social knowledge. The audience is presented with the notion that advertisements reiterate what we as a society understand about what a man or a woman should be. Throughout the film, Jhally explains why there is nothing natural about gender identity and describes Goffman's famous concept of gender display as "the process whereby we perform the roles expected of us by social convention." Jhally further relates the unusualness of the poses to Goffman when we challenges them by questioning what reactions may be should the women be replaced by men. The results of this situation can often demonstrate society's expectations in regards to gender and the way individuals perform it.

Jhally uses highly distinctive visual images to convey his message to viewers. The key message through these images are that men are presented to be powerful, whereas women are continuously displayed to be passive. Every position portrays a different gender code. Women are made to look fragile; empathic; powerless; subordinate, yet men are displayed as confident; strong; in control. These images bring to light various concepts that Erving Goffman presents such as the feminine touch and function ranking which further reproduce the subordination of women in advertising. Jhally analyzes the images displayed throughout the film by concentrating on various gestures such as placement of the hands, knees, arms; facial expressions and eye contact.
