= Richard Landes =

American historian and author (born 1949)

Richard Allen Landes (born 1949) is an American historian and author who specializes in medieval millennial thinking. Until 2015 he taught at Boston University, and then began working at Bar-Ilan University, Ramat Gan, Israel. Landes is also known for coining in part and popularizing Pallywood, a term used to accuse Palestinians of staging scenes of suffering and violence for the media.

== Biography ==
Landes is the son of Harvard professor of economics and history David Landes. His early publications were concerned with hagiography: his first published monograph was a translation of the vita of Saint Martial; his second was on the scribe and forger Adémar de Chabannes. Until 2015, he was a professor in the Department of History at Boston University, and the director of Boston University's Center for Millennial Studies. Since 2015, he has been a Senior Fellow at the Center for International Communication at Bar-Ilan University, in Ramat Gan, Israel.

Landes was formerly married to historian of early Christianity Paula Fredriksen. He lives with his wife in Jerusalem. Landes's daughter, Aliza Landes, founded the military forces of Israel digital media initiative.

== Academic work ==
Landes specializes in millennial thinking in the Middle Ages, particularly around the year 1000. In 2000, Landes published what was said to be the first encyclopedia on the topic of millennial movements in Europe, the Encyclopedia of Millennialism and Millennial Movements. Landes also published "Celebrating Orientalism" wherein he argues that the Palestinian critic Edward Said and Arabs in general do not like to be orientalized because of honour-shame culture.

In "Orientalism, a Thousand and One Times" and "Warientalism, or the Carrier of Firewood", Landes's discourse is labelled Warientalist, a concept that refers to a discourse defined by power and sentiment rather than knowledge.

== Pallywood ==
Landes coined the term Pallywood (a derogatory portmanteau for "Palestinian Hollywood"), described by Ruthie Blum as referring to alleged "productions staged by the Palestinians, in front of (and often with cooperation from) Western camera crews, for the purpose of promoting anti-Israel propaganda by disguising it as news."

From a cultural view, Landes said that the persistence of the Arab–Israeli conflict is due not to injustice or partiality, but to an honor-shame culture in both the Arab and Palestinian cultures.

== Books ==
=== Monographs ===
- Landes, Richard A.; Paupert, Catherine (1991). Naissance d'Apôtre: Les origines de la Vita prolixior de Saint Martial de Limoges au XIe siècle. Turnhout: Brepols. ISBN 978-2-503-50045-4.
- Landes, Richard A. (1995). Relics, apocalypse, and the deceits of history: Ademar of Chabannes, 989-1034. Cambridge: Harvard University Press. ISBN 0-674-75530-8.
- Landes, Richard A. (2011). Heaven on Earth: The Varieties of the Millennial Experience. Oxford: Oxford University Press. ISBN 9780199753598.
- Landes, Richard A. (2022). Can "The Whole World" Be Wrong?: Lethal Journalism, Antisemitism, and Global Jihad (Antisemitism in America). Academic Studies Press. ISBN 978-1644696408.

=== Edited books, collections ===
- Landes, Richard A.; Head, Thomas J., eds. (1987). Essays on the Peace of God: The church and the people in eleventh-century France. Waterloo, Ontario: Waterloo University. OCLC 18039359.
- Landes, Richard A.; Head, Thomas J., eds. (1992). The Peace of God: Social violence and religious response in France around the year 1000. Ithaca, N.Y: Cornell University Press. ISBN 0-8014-2741-X.
- Landes, Richard A., ed. (2000). Encyclopedia of Millennialism and Millennial Movements. New York: Routledge. ISBN 0-415-92246-1.
- Landes, Richard A.; Van Meter, David; Gow, Andrew Sydenham Farrar, eds. (2003). The apocalyptic year 1000: Religious expectation and social change, 950-1050. Oxford: Oxford University Press. ISBN 0-19-511191-5.
- Landes, Richard A.; Katz, Stephen, eds. (2012). The Paranoid Apocalypse: A Hundred Year Retrospective on The Protocols of the Elders of Zion. New York: New York University Press. ISBN 9780814748923.
