= Greg Myre =

American journalist

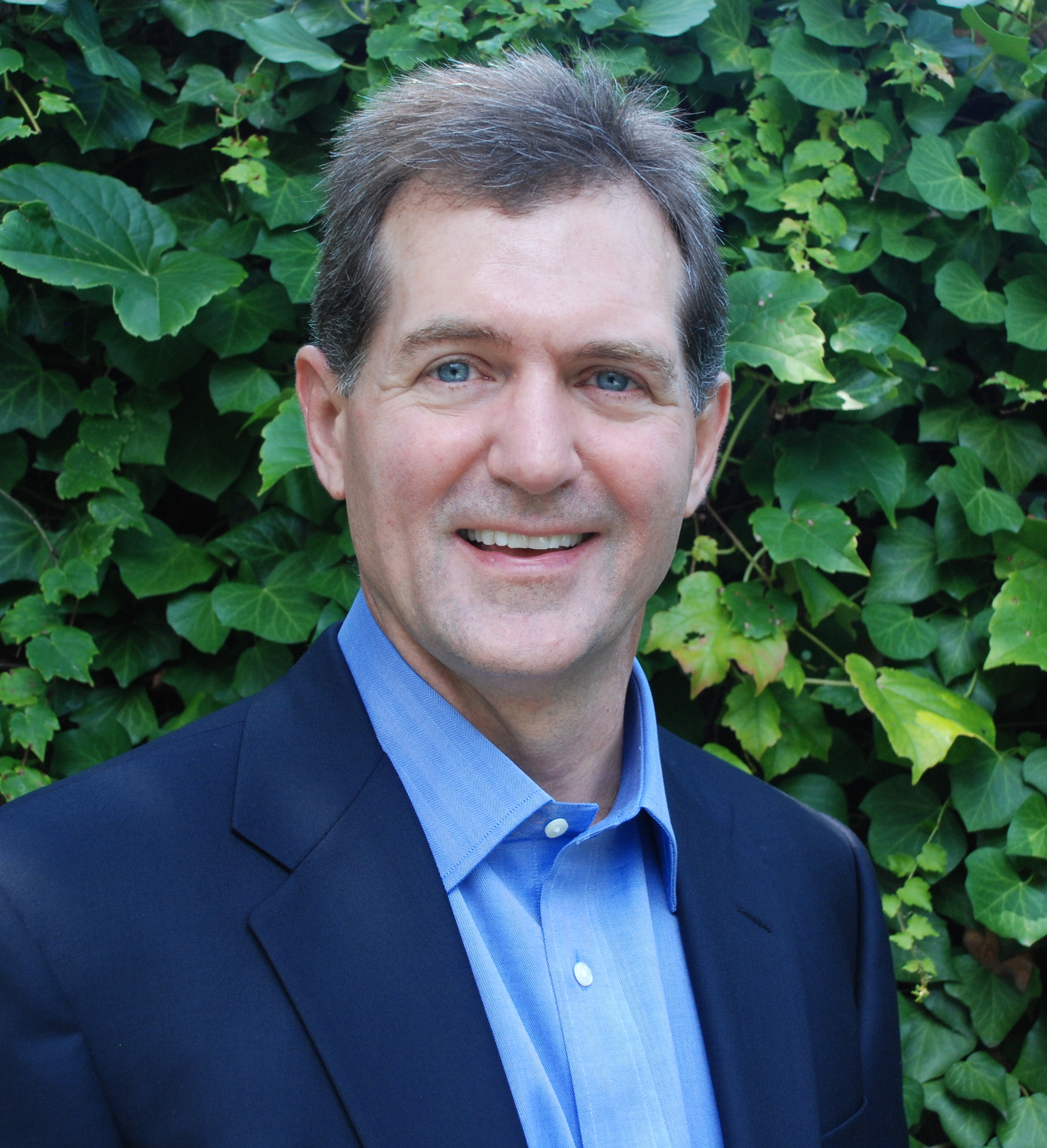
- Greg Myre
- Born: John Gregory Myre; United States
- Occupation: Journalist
- Notable credit(s): The New York Times, Associated Press
- Spouse: Jennifer Griffin
- Children: 2

Greg Myre is an American journalist and an NPR national security correspondent with a focus on the intelligence community. Before joining NPR, he was a foreign correspondent for the Associated Press and The New York Times for 20 years. He reported from more than 50 countries and covered a dozen wars and conflicts.

Myre is a member of the Council on Foreign Relations and a scholar at the Middle East Institute in Washington. He has appeared as an analyst on CNN, PBS, BBC, C-SPAN, Fox News, and Al Jazeera.

== Career ==
After four years in the U.S. with the Associated Press, Myre was first posted abroad to Johannesburg, South Africa, in 1987 and covered Nelson Mandela's release from prison and the end of apartheid. He was later based in Islamabad, Pakistan, where he frequently traveled to neighboring Afghanistan and documented the rise of the Taliban. He was one of the first Western reporters to meet Taliban leaders in 1995.

Myre was also posted to Cyprus and worked throughout the Middle East, including extended trips to Iran, Iraq, Syria, Lebanon, Turkey, and Saudi Arabia. He went to Moscow from 1996 to 1999, covering the early days of Vladimir Putin as Russia's leader.

He was based in Jerusalem during heavy fighting between the Israelis and the Palestinians in the Al-Aqsa Intifada. He joined The New York Times in Jerusalem in 2003 and reported there until 2007.

During his two decades abroad, he covered wars throughout Africa, the Middle East, South Asia and the Balkans.

== Notable articles ==
In 1990, Myre witnessed Nelson Mandela's release from prison and was among the journalists who met with Mandela on his first full day out of prison. On the 25th anniversary of Mandela's release from prison in 2013, Myre wrote an article for NPR recounting the day, titled "The Day Nelson Mandela Walked Out Of Prison".

In 2016, Myre reported for NPR on how Syria's war had created millions of refugees, in a video titled "Syria: The Worst Humanitarian Crisis Of The 21st Century".

While based in Jerusalem, Myre covered all the major developments in the Second Palestinian Intifada from 2000 to 2007. This included many of the Palestinian suicide bombings in Israel, Israeli military operations against the Palestinians, the Israeli withdrawal of settlers and soldiers from the Gaza Strip and election victories by Hamas.

== Personal ==
Myre is married to Jennifer Griffin, the national security correspondent for the Fox News Channel at the Pentagon. The couple met at a political rally in a sports stadium in South Africa, on October 29, 1989. Griffin was a college student at Harvard, working for The Sowetan newspaper while Myre was a staff correspondent with the Associated Press.

Myre and Griffin co-wrote This Burning Land: Lessons From The Front Lines Of The Transformed Israeli-Palestinian Conflict (ISBN 978-0470550908), published in 2011.

Myre is the son of Carole and John Myre from Chesterfield, Missouri. His mother is a psychotherapist and his father is a retired director of risk management in St. Louis. His father also authored a book, Live Safely in a Dangerous World.

Myre is a graduate of Yale University, where he played varsity football and basketball.
