= Raanan Gissin =

Israeli political scientist (1949–2023)

- רענן גיסין
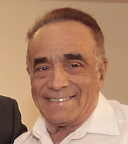
- Gissin in 2015
- Born: 28 February 1949; Ra'anana or HaSolelim, Israel
- Died: 26 June 2023 (aged 74)
- Education: Hebrew University of Jerusalem, (BA, M.Sc); Syracuse University (PhD)

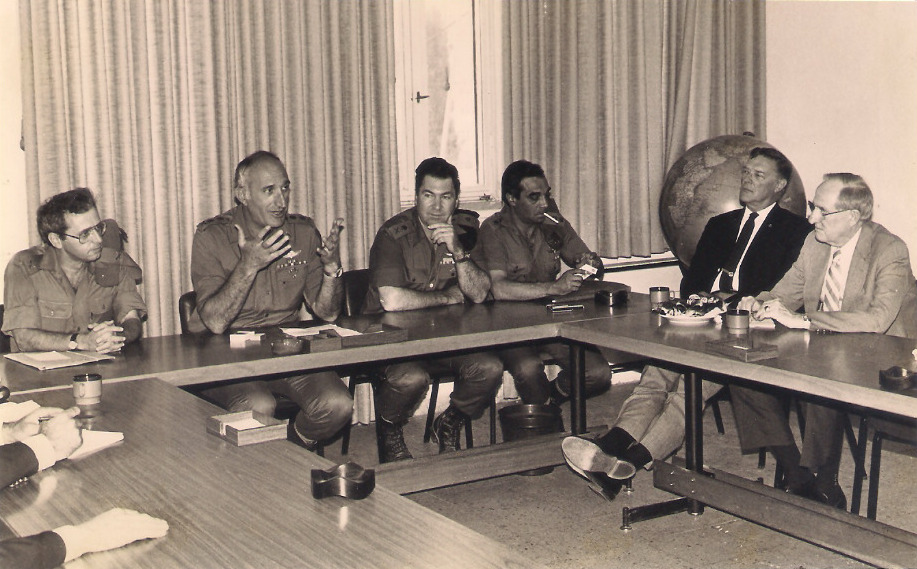
Briefing of senators from the US, 1986, from left to right: IDF Spokesman Brigadier General Ephraim Lapid, Chief of Staff Major General Moshe Levi, Deputy Chief of Staff Major General Dan Shomron, Head of the International Communications Branch of the IDF Spokesperson's Unit, Lt. Col. Ra'anan Gissin

Raanan Gissin (Hebrew: רענן גיסין; 28 February 1949 – 26 June 2023) was an Israeli political scientist, analyst and consultant specializing in the Arab–Israeli conflict. He was senior adviser to Israeli Prime Minister Ariel Sharon and a frequent spokesman for the Israeli government on CNN, MSNBC, and Fox.

== Early life and education ==
Gissin had Israeli Jewish roots with his family going back five generations, and was born in Ra'anana, Israel, thus, the selection of his name. In July 1949, his parents moved to kibbutz HaSolelim. He was born there on 28 February 1949.

When my great-grandparents came from Russia a hundred and fifty years ago, my grandfather came with a Bible in one hand and a rifle in another, and his hand was extended to the Arabs who lived here, some did make business with him and others who fought him had to meet the wrath of his rifle, and that’s how you live in the Middle East.

- 1973 B.A., Hebrew University of Jerusalem.
- 1975 M.Sc. in Broadcasting Journalism, Hebrew University of Jerusalem.
- 1979 PhD in Political Science and Public Administration, Syracuse University, New York.

== Other involvement ==
Gissin featured as an authority in the documentary Relentless: The Struggle for Peace in the Middle East. Col. (Res.) Raanan Gissin, PhD., had become one of Israel's leading spokesmen to the international press on security and strategic issues, and the peace process. Until recently (2001–2006), he served as Foreign Press & Public Adviser to the Prime Minister of Israel.

In 1996, Gissin was appointed Spokesperson for the newly formed Ministry of National Infrastructure headed by Minister Ariel Sharon. He also served as Mr. Sharon's personal Adviser of Public and Media Affairs. He served as a strategic consultant, commentator and lecturer on a variety of topics related to the Middle East, Israel, the war against terror, and media and government relations. In 1998, he became Senior Public Affairs and Media Adviser to Minister of Foreign Affairs Ariel Sharon.

Gissin participated in the conference and negotiations which led to the signing of the Wye Memorandum in October 1998 in Washington D.C. In 1999, following the change of government, he continued to serve as a special consultant to Ariel Sharon. In 2003, he received the Louis Brandeis Award of outstanding contribution to Zionism and for dedication to the cause of attaining peace and security for the State of Israel. During the period 2001–2006, he has served as Foreign Press & Public Affairs Adviser and reported directly to the Prime Ministers Ariel Sharon and Ehud Olmert.

== Death ==
Gissin died on 26 June 2023, at the age of 74.
