= Palestinian Media Watch =

Israel-based non-governmental organization

- Abbreviation: PMW
- Formation: 1996
- Type: NGO
- Location: Israel
- Founding director: Itamar Marcus
- Website: www.palwatch.org

Palestinian Media Watch (PMW; Hebrew: מבט לתקשורת פלסטינית) is an Israel-based nongovernmental organization and media watchdog group. Founded in 1996 by Itamar Marcus, Palestinian Media Watch documents cases of incitement in Palestinian media.

== History ==
Itamar Marcus established Palestinian Media Watch (PMW) in 1996.

In 2011, Marcus and PNW researcher Jacques Zilberdik released a book entitled Deception: Betraying the Peace Process, a collection of media samples from 2010 to 2011 of messages broadcast to a domestic audience by the Palestinian Authority that the authors say show a pattern of non-recognition of Israel's right to exist, demonization of Israel and promotion of violence.

PMW states that the PA glorifies terrorists, libels Israel, and promotes a culture of violence.

== Reports to Western political bodies ==
A report Palestinian Media Watch presented to the United States House Committee on Foreign Affairs in 2008 indicated that the Palestinian Authority was engaging with enemies of the United States on a shared platform of hatred toward the U.S. The report argued that under such circumstances, the creation of an independent Palestinian state would contribute to the undermining U.S. efforts toward world peace.

In 2011 Palestinian Media Watch presented U.S. congressmen with a report indicating that more than $5 million of U.S. funding for the Palestinian Authority was being used to pay salaries to Palestinian prisoners jailed in Israel on terrorism-related charges. The report also cited instances of the Palestinian Authority glorifying the perpetrators of terrorist attacks against Israelis.

== Reports to Israeli security bodies ==
In 2012, Haaretz reported that as a consequence of Israeli intelligence agencies having reduced their own real-time monitoring of mainstream Arab-language media, Palestinian Media Watch and the Washington, D.C.–based Middle East Media Research Institute provide the Israeli government with coverage of anti-Israel incitement in the Palestinian media. The Prime Minister's Bureau has stated that prior to the government citing information furnished by the two organizations, the source of the material and its credibility are verified.

== Media monitoring ==
=== 2007–2012 ===
In 2007 widespread criticism was generated around a children's television program, Tomorrow's Pioneers, aired from Hamas-run studios in the Gaza Strip. The program employed a Mickey Mouse–inspired figure in order to instill anti-American and anti-Israeli sentiment and promote a message of Islamic dominion among children. Palestinian Media Watch, together with the Middle East Media Research Institute (MEMRI), were the first to raise concerns in relation to the show.

In 2008 Palestinian Media Watch generated outrage again when it circulated a recording of Tomorrow's Pioneers in which a Bugs Bunny-like figure proclaimed, "I will eat the Jews."

A Palestinian Media Watch report from 2012 stated that a puppet show performed in front of Palestinian children and sponsored by the United Nations-funded organization Burj al Luq Luq Community Centre and Society called on children to take up arms in lieu of cigarettes. A separate report from the same year stated that two television hosts from the Palestinian Youth Association for Leadership and Rights Activation (PYALARA), an organization that receives funding from the European Commission Humanitarian Aid Office, Save the Children U.K. and Cordaid, described suicide bombers as "the greatest role models for us" during a weekly TV program. The Burj al Luq Luq website was subsequently taken offline, and Save the Children U.K. launched an investigation into PYALARA.

=== 2013 ===
In early 2013 a report by Palestinian Media Watch indicating that the Palestinian Authority glorified acts of terrorism against the State of Israel sparked debate in Norway over the latter's contribution to the PA of some $52.5 million annually. NRK, the Norwegian public broadcasting network, used the PMW report in its coverage and stated that according to the Norwegian Center for Studies of Holocaust and Religious Minorities a Palestinian television channel, partly controlled by the Palestinian Authority, occasionally conveys hatred and demonization towards Israel. NRK reported that programs broadcast on Palestinian television praise prisoners involved in killing Israeli civilians. NRK also conducted a survey of its own in Jerusalem and the West Bank, finding among other things that several Palestinians believed the Protocols of the Elders of Zion forgery is authentic and that it reflects "Jewish plans" for world domination. The Norwegian Holocaust Center, which also contributed money to the Palestinian Authority, said PA TV demonized Israel and spread antisemitism.

Emad Alsafar, the program director of the Palestinian television channel, denied the charges of demonization and antisemitism, stating that Palestinians took issues with the occupation, not with Jews. He said that in live broadcasts undesirable views are occasionally expressed, but there is an effort to correct these in retrospect. Norwegian State Secretary Torgeir Larsen admitted that Palestinian Media Watch had presented examples of antisemitism but stated that these were examples and that PMW had their own agenda in presenting the material. In relation to an additional NRK report on claims made by PMW that the Palestinian Authority pays monthly salaries to Palestinians convicted of terrorist activities including murder, the Norwegian Foreign Ministry felt it important to state that PMW is on the right wing of Israeli politics and that its founder, Itamar Marcus, resides in an illegal settlement in the West Bank. Norwegian MP Peter Gitmark subsequently called on his parliament's scrutiny committee to investigate the matter of what he called Norway's "indirect" contribution to Palestinian terrorism.

In 2013, an Israeli family sued Palestinian officials for responsibility for "incitement against Israel which led to terrorist attacks against Israel and Israelis" in a Tel Aviv district court. Itamar Marcus was called as expert witness, but Judge Dalia Gannot found Marcus incompetent as such. The Media Watch further argued that "the PA follows an explicit policy of incitement against Israel and the Jews," but Judge Gannot found that to be unproven. The case against the Palestinian officials was dismissed.

== YouTube channel ==
In December 2010, YouTube removed Palestinian Media Watch's channel from its servers. The channel, which featured videos of Palestinian incitement against Jews and Israelis, was shut down for airing hate speech. Itamar Marcus stated that the move was triggered by a video showing a Hamas terrorist urging Palestinians to "drink the blood of Jews." The channel was reactivated later in the month after supporters expressed outrage over its removal.

== Reception ==
According to a 2012 article in Haaretz, Palestinian Media Watch and its founder are associated with Israel's right wing, and the majority of information furnished by PMW relating to Palestinian incitement is of a professional nature.

In an opinion piece for The Hill, Hanan Ashrawi of the Palestine Liberation Organization accused Palestinian Media Watch of having close links with the Central Fund of Israel and having an overly broad definition of incitement.

Australia's former ambassador to Israel Ian Wilcock, in an opinion piece for The Australian, said of PMM that it "does an outstanding job of bringing attention to what the Palestinian Authority and related organisations are saying in Arabic, as opposed to the usually more temperate comments made in English for the world outside the Middle East." As examples, Wilcock stated that The Protocols of the Elders of Zion was prominent in the ideology of the Palestinian Authority, that a Palestinian Authority youth magazine had featured a young woman dreaming of explaining to Adolf Hitler why she killed Jews, and that a Palestinian Authority newspaper had referred to Passover as "the holiday of the apes."

== Award ==
In February 2015, PMW director was awarded the Abramowitz Israeli Prize for Media Criticism. The Abramowitz Israeli Prize for Media Criticism was funded by Mrs. Nira and Mr. Kenneth Abramowitz. Mr. Kenneth Abramowitz is a New York businessman, and a donor to Israel's Media Watch.

== See also ==
- Middle East Media Research Institute
- Al-Aqsa TV
- Deception: Betraying the Peace Process
- Pallywood
