= Ofir Gendelman =

Israeli diplomat (1971-)

Ofir Gendelman (Hebrew: אופיר גנדלמן; Arabic: أوفير جندلمان; born July 19, 1971) is an Israeli diplomat and current spokesperson to the Arab media in the Israel Prime Minister's Office, a position he has held since April 2010, prior to which he served in the same role at the Israel Ministry of Foreign Affairs. Gendelman has been a regular fixture on various Arab media outlets since 2001.

== Biography ==
Gendelman was born in Israel in 1971. He graduated from the Ha-Reali Ha-Ivri High School in Haifa in 1989, majoring in Arabic and Islam. Upon graduation, he joined the Israel Defense Forces and remained in service until 1994. In 1997 Gendelman received a dual bachelor's degree in international relations and in Middle Eastern studies from the Hebrew University of Jerusalem, and in 2000 he received a master's degree in Strategic Studies from Tel Aviv University. He later received a Master of Business Administration from Bar Ilan University in 2010.

== Career ==
In 1998, Gendelman joined the Israeli Ministry of Foreign Affairs as an analyst on Palestinian affairs at the ministry's Center for Political Analysis, which is the foreign ministry's political intelligence bureau. In 2001 he joined the diplomatic training program at the ministry and graduated as a political officer with the rank of Second Secretary. Later that year he was appointed as the first ever foreign ministry spokesman to the Arab media, a role he fulfilled during the peak of the Second Intifada.

Gendelman was appointed as Consul and Second Secretary at the Israeli Embassy to Canada In 2003 and served there until 2007. He returned to Israel, assuming the role of deputy director of the Arab press and public diplomacy division of the foreign ministry. In 2008 he became the division's director and in this capacity was responsible for crafting and managing the foreign ministry's public diplomacy campaigns to the Arab world and served also as the ministry's spokesman to the Arab media.

In 2009, Gendelman took a leave of absence from the foreign ministry and moved to the private sector where he became the founding CEO of the Israeli-Palestinian Chamber of Commerce and Industry (IPCC). In this role he worked to bring together Israeli and Palestinian businesspeople and companies and helped in creating joint ventures. In April 2010 he joined the Prime Minister's Office as its first ever spokesperson to the Arab world.

In April 2010, he was appointed the prime minister's spokesman for the Arab media, the first to hold this position. He served under until January 2023. Then he turned to the private market and founded a consulting company, "Gendelman Strategic Consulting", which helps Israeli companies find clients in the United Arab Emirates, Bahrain and Morocco. In October 2023, following the Gaza war, he returned to this position.

In November 2023, amid the Gaza war, Gendelman circulated a clip from a Lebanese short film, claiming that it was proof that Palestinians were faking videos, and calling it an example of "Pallywood". The previous week, Gendelman had shared IDF training videos as war footage, and in 2021, he was found by international media to have misrepresented 2018 footage from Syria as current footage from Gaza.
