= William Leiss =

American-Canadian academic (born 1939)

William Leiss OC FRSC
- Born: 1939 (age 86–87); Long Island, New York, US

Academic background
- Education: Fairleigh Dickinson University; Brandeis University; University of California, San Diego
- Thesis: The Domination of Nature (1969)
- Doctoral advisor: Herbert Marcuse

Academic work
- School or tradition: Critical theory
- Institutions: University of Regina; York University; University of Toronto; Simon Fraser University; Queen's University; University of Calgary
- Doctoral students: Ian Angus; Sut Jhally
- Main interests: Environment; science and society; risk communication
- Website: leiss.ca

William Leiss OC FRSC (born 1939) is an American-Canadian academic who served as president of the Royal Society of Canada from 1999 to 2001.

Born on Long Island, New York, at the end of 1939, he grew up in rural Pennsylvania. He began his university education in New Jersey, at Fairleigh Dickinson University, graduating in 1956 with a Bachelor of Arts degree summa cum laude (major in history and minor in accounting); then in Massachusetts, with a Master of Arts degree in the history of ideas program at Brandeis University (1963); and finally with a Doctor of Philosophy degree in philosophy from the University of California, San Diego (1969). Leiss studied with Herbert Marcuse at the University of California.

Leiss started his academic career in the political science department at the University of Regina, before moving on in 1973 to two stints with the Faculty of Environmental Studies at York University (also political science and the graduate programme in social and political thought there), interrupted by a brief stay at the University of Toronto's Department of Sociology; then in 1980 to the School of Communication at Simon Fraser University, where he was department chair for six years and later vice-president, Research. He was awarded the five-year, externally funded Eco-Research Chair in Environmental Policy at the School of Policy Studies, Queen's University, in 1994 and was then in the Faculty of Management at the University of Calgary where he held a five-year research chair, the NSERC/SSHRC/Industry Chair in Risk Communication and Public Policy, funded under the granting councils' Management of Technological Change program. He is now at the University of Ottawa, in the R. Samuel McLaughlin Centre for Population Health Risk Assessment as scientist and adjunct professor.

His work on risk communication in science and policy has informed recent analysis on biotechnology governance in Canada by political scientists G. Bruce Doern and Michael J. Prince.

In 2003, he was made an Officer of the Order of Canada.

== Publications ==
- "Husserl's Crisis". Telos 8 (Summer 1971). New York: Telos Press.
- The Domination of Nature, first published in 1972 and dedicated to fellow student Angela Davis
- The Limits to Satisfaction (1976)
- Social Communication in Advertising (1986)
- C. B. Macpherson: Dilemmas of Liberalism and Socialism, Second Edition (2009)
- Under Technology's Thumb (1990)
- Risk and Responsibility (1994)
- Mad Cows and Mother's Milk (1997)
- In the Chamber of Risks (2001)
- Hera (2006)
- The Doom Loop in the Financial Sector, & Other Black Holes of Risk (2010)

Professional and academic associations
Preceded by Jean-Pierre Wallot	President of the Royal Society of Canada; 1999–2001	Succeeded by Howard Alper
