= Bathsheba Ratzkoff =

American film director, producer and editor

Bathsheba Ratzkoff is an American film director, producer, and editor.

== Biography ==
Ratzkoff is the co-director of the 2004 documentary Peace, Propaganda & the Promised Land. She is also an associate producer on the documentary “Hijacking Catastrophe: 9/11, Fear & the Selling of American Empire” and also produced a film called “Reel Bad Arabs: How Hollywood Vilifies A People.” She is a graduate of the University of Massachusetts Amherst.

Peace, Propaganda & the Promised Land is a 2004 documentary by Sut Jhally and Bathsheba Ratzkoff which—according to the film's official website—"provides a striking comparison of U.S. and international media coverage of the crisis in the Middle East, zeroing in on how structural distortions in U.S. coverage have reinforced false perceptions of the Israeli-Palestinian conflict" and which "analyzes and explains how--through the use of language, framing and context--the Israeli occupation of the West Bank and Gaza remains hidden in the news media". The film argues that the influence of pro-Israel media watchdog groups, such as CAMERA and Honest Reporting, has led to distorted and pro-Israel media reports. It features Noam Chomsky, Robert Jensen, Hanan Ashrawi, Sam Husseini, and Robert Fisk, among others.
