= Itamar Marcus =

Israeli researcher

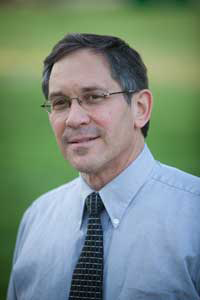
Itamar Marcus, 2015

Itamar Marcus (Hebrew: איתמר מרכוס) is an Israeli researcher and the founder and director of Palestinian Media Watch, which studies Palestinian society by monitoring and analyzing the Palestinian Authority (PA) through its media and schoolbooks.

His work on textbooks led Benyamin Netanyahu to appoint Marcus to represent his country in the negotiations with the Palestinians on incitement in the Trilateral Anti-Incitement Committee (Israeli–Palestinian–American) in his capacity as Director of Research for the Center for Monitoring the Impact of Peace (CMP), where he served from 1998 to 2000.

As Director of Research for CMP, Marcus wrote reports on PA, Syrian and Jordanian schoolbooks. CMP reportedly broke its link with Marcus stemming from criticisms stemming from disparities in CMP's analysis of Israeli and Palestinian textbooks. "Incendiary quotations are explained, analyzed, and contextualized in the report on Israeli books; they are listed with only brief and sensationalist explanations in the reports on Palestinian books. In short, the center is fair, balanced and understanding toward Israeli textbooks but tendentious on Palestinian books." In February 2007, together with then Senator Hillary Clinton he released a report on the newest PA schoolbooks at a press conference in Washington.

Marcus testified before the Education Subcommittee of the US Senate Committee on Allocations, documenting the Palestinian Authority's indoctrination of children to seek death as Shahids – Martyrs – for public relations purposes. He has also presented before members of Congress, and to members of Parliament in numerous countries including, the European Union, United Kingdom, France, Canada, and Australia, and has lectured in universities and conferences worldwide.

Marcus is a featured source for the documentary Obsession: Radical Islam's War Against the West.

Marcus is a former vice president of the Central Fund of Israel. Originally from New York City, he now lives in the Israeli settlement of Efrat in the West Bank.

== Bibliography ==
- Brown, Nathan J. (2003). Palestinian politics after the Oslo accords: resuming Arab Palestine. University of California Press. ISBN 978-0-520-24115-2
- Great Britain: Parliament: House of Lords: European Union Committee (2007). The EU and the Middle East Peace process: 26th report of session 2006–07, Vol. 2: Evidence. HMSO. 9780104011225
- Monheit, Alan C. & Cantor Joel C. (2004). State health insurance market reform: toward inclusive and sustainable health insurance markets. Routledge. ISBN 978-0-415-70035-1

== External reference ==
- Palestinian Media Watch website
