= Deception: Betraying the Peace Process =

2011 book by Itamar Marcus

- Author: Itamar Marcus; Nan Jacques Zilberdik
- Publisher: Palestinian Media Watch
- Publication date: 2011
- OCLC: 781471843

Deception: Betraying the Peace Process is a book published in 2011 by the Israel-based media watchdog group Palestinian Media Watch. Deception analyses a year of cultural, educational and general media sources in the Palestinian Authority (PA), beginning from May 2010, the month that indirect Israeli–Palestinian talks were initiated by the US. The book concludes that the PA systematically fomented anti-Israel sentiment and promoted violence to undermine the peace process and a two-state solution. It reports hundreds of examples of the "PA's policy of" glorifying terrorism and demonizing Israelis and Jews, in print, websites, videos, and school texts. It states that the Palestinian leadership is deceiving the international community, presenting itself in English as pursuing peace, while propagating hate speech and support for violence in Arabic.

== Findings ==
The authors state that Palestinian children are being indoctrinated to hate. The book cited the PA youth magazine Zayzafuna which published a story about a girl who meets Adolf Hitler in a dream. In the dream, Hitler justifies the killing of Jews because they are "a nation which spreads destruction all over the world." The host of a children’s television program stated that "the Jews are our enemies, right?" and the station interviewed several Jordanian experts on the Middle East who stated, "the Jews are hated everywhere they have been due to their love of money."

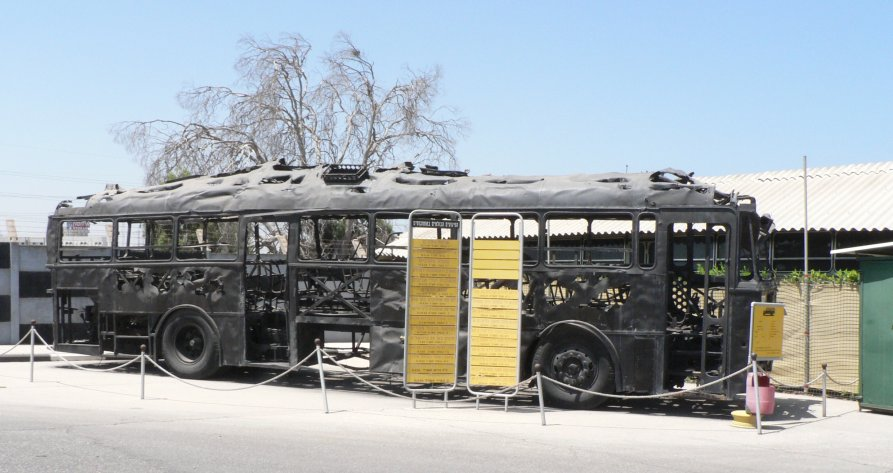
Charred remains of a bus attacked during the 1978 Coastal Road Massacre

The book also states that the Palestinian Authority glorifies terrorism. Dalal Mughrabi, who murdered an American and 37 Israelis, 13 of them children, in the 1978 Coastal Road Massacre, is venerated in Palestinian society. Mughrabi is the subject of a song regularly played on Palestinian Authority television. The Palestinian Authority sponsored "the Dalal Mughrabi football championship" for children and named a summer camp named after Mughrabi. Teams competing in a youth table tennis tournament were named after Palestinian militant leaders.

The book describes the frequent denial of Israel's right to exist in official Palestinian Authority media. The Israeli cities of Acre, Haifa, Lod, Ramla and Tel Aviv were repeatedly described as part of occupied Palestine. This especially occurred on youth programs. Maps printed by the Palestinian Authority did not display the state of Israel even within the UN’s 1948 borders, and all the land from the Jordan River to the Mediterranean Sea was termed "Palestine." Denial of any Jewish historic or religious connection to Jerusalem was widespread.

The book states the PA regularly denies that the Holocaust took place, or distorts it and downplays the number of Jews killed. In 2011, PA leaders and UNRWA employees strongly opposed UN proposals to teach Palestinian children about the Holocaust as part of the curriculum in United Nations Relief and Works Agency schools.

Nan Jacques Zilberdik, co-author of the book, stated that there was no discourse on compromise in the Palestinian Authority media, unlike its Israeli counterpart. She said that it was easier for the international community to assess construction within settlements than the extent of Palestinian incitement. Palestinian Media Watch opined that while the incitement was not as severe as in the past, it still promoted a "culture of violence."

== Reception ==
Nobel laureate Elie Wiesel and the founder of Human Rights Watch and Advancing Human Rights founder, Robert Bernstein, spoke at the launch of the book. Wiesel said it was a "terrifying book" and deplored children becoming "agents of hatred." Bernstein said that "government-sponsored hate speech" was "incompatible with peace".

Isabel Kershner of The New York Times stated that Palestinian incitement had "entrenched the sides to the conflict" and undermined confidence in a resolution. She said the Palestinian Authority's messages seem "at odds with the pursuit of peace and a two-state solution." She also observed that critics of Itamar Marcus, who co-authored this book, point out that he lives in an Israeli settlement in the West Bank and that some of the published examples were old and had other possible interpretations. Palestinian Authority spokesman Ghassan Khatib stated incitement by the Palestinians had been reduced significantly and that the book is "not a serious attempt to solve the problem of incitement." He further questioned whether "the Israelis improving or reversing in this regard."

Jonathan Tobin stated that "the hatred and delegitimization for Jews and Israel that is mainstream opinion among Palestinians" was devastating, and could not be ignored. Richard Chesnoff criticized the "doublespeak" of the Palestinian political leadership and said the book provided depressing evidence that Palestinians were unprepared to make peace with Israel.

Asaf Romirowsky of the Scholars for Peace in the Middle East said that the facts documented in the book were of "great value" and exposed how the Palestinian media had produced "one of the major obstacles to genuine reconciliation and mutual recognition."

== See also ==
- Media coverage of the Arab–Israeli conflict
- Israeli–Palestinian peace process
