= Peace, Propaganda & the Promised Land =

- Directed by: Sut Jhally; Bathsheba Ratzkoff
- Written by: Sut Jhally; Bathsheba Ratzkoff
- Starring: Noam Chomsky; Robert Jensen; Hanan Ashrawi; Robert Fisk
- Distributed by: Media Education Foundation
- Release date: 2004
- Running time: 80 minutes
- Country: United States
- Languages: English; Arabic; French; Hebrew; Spanish

Peace, Propaganda & the Promised Land is a 2004 American documentary film directed by Sut Jhally and Bathsheba Ratzkoff which—according to the film's official website—"provides a striking comparison of U.S. and international media coverage of the crisis in the Middle East, zeroing in on how structural distortions in U.S. coverage have reinforced false perceptions of the Israeli–Palestinian conflict" and which "analyzes and explains how—through the use of language, framing and context—the Israeli occupation of the West Bank and Gaza remains hidden in the news media". The film argues that the influence of pro-Israel media watchdog groups, such as CAMERA and Honest Reporting, has led to distorted and pro-Israel media reports. It features Noam Chomsky, Robert Jensen, Hanan Ashrawi, Sam Husseini, and Robert Fisk, among others.

In its response to the movie, the Jewish Community Relations Council (JCRC) of San Francisco, a Jewish communal advocacy organization, criticized the film for not discussing the influence of "the numerous pro‐Palestinian media watchdog groups, including FAIR (Fairness and Accuracy in Reporting, which describes itself as 'A National Media Watch Group'), whose spokesperson played a prominent role in the film".

A review in The New York Times by Ned Martel found that the film "largely ignores Palestinian leadership, which has surely played a part in the conflict's broken vows and broken hearts. And such a lack of dispassion weakens the one-sided film's bold and detailed argument".

== See also ==
The media

- Media coverage of the Arab–Israeli conflict
- Media bias
- Propaganda
- Spin
- Hasbara

The conflict

- Arab–Israeli conflict
- Israeli–Palestinian conflict
- Second Intifada
