= List of Americans in the Israel Defense Forces =

This lists American citizens have served in the Israel Defense Forces (IDF), including politicians and journalists.

This list is also inclusive of American citizen lone soldiers, members of the IDF who do not have support in Israel, either because they do not have immediate family in Israel or they are estranged from their family in Israel. As of 2016, according to Michael Meyerheim, COO of the Lone Soldier Center, "more lone soldiers from abroad come from the United States than from any other foreign country".

== Background ==
Israel enforces mandatory conscription in the Israel Defense Forces (IDF) for its citizens at age 18. Additionally, Israeli and American dual citizens living in Israel are required to serve. The IDF permits citizens of foreign countries to serve, provided they meet requirements including speaking Hebrew, attaining a high school diploma, and no criminal record.

United States law generally permits American citizens to serve in foreign militaries. Following the 1986 amendments to the Immigration and Nationality Act, the United States Department of State has generally not expatriation for Americans serving in allied militaries, only in cases of "(1) those armed forces are engaged in hostilities against the United States or (2) the U.S. national serves as a commissioned or noncommissioned officer (8 U.S.C. §1481)". US citizens serving in a foreign military who facilitate war crimes can be investigated and charged under the 1996 War Crimes Act.

In the United States, there are a variety of organizations that support American citizens serving as lone soldiers in the IDF. Friends of the Israel Defense Forces is a New York City-based organization that fundraisers for social, cultural, and recreational needs of Israeli Soldiers.

== History ==
In July 2014, Friends of the Israel Defense Forces estimated 750 American citizens were serving in the IDF. In the same month, a spokesperson for the Israel Consul General in Los Angeles said there were about 2,000 lone soldiers from the United States in the IDF.

As of February 2024, 23,380 American citizens were serving in the Israel Defense Forces (IDF), many of them settlers in Israel, with some reservists living in the United States having been called to fight in the Gaza War.

In 2024, H.R. 8445 was introduced to the 188th United States Congress by representatives Guy Reschenthaler (R-PA) and Max Miller (R-OH) that would amend federal law to "provide for the eligibility of United States citizens who serve in the Israeli Defense Forces for certain protections relating to such service."

== Lone soldiers ==
- Michael Levin – American-Israeli soldier (1984–2006)
- Max Steinberg – American-Israeli soldier (1990–2014)
- Edan Alexander – American-Israeli former hostage in Gaza
- Omer Neutra, tank captain killed in combat with Hamas during the October 7 attacks
- Ari Fuld, settler stabbed to death in the West Bank in 2019
- Eli HaZe'ev, Kahanist settler who was killed in the 1980 Hebron attack
- Daniel Raab, born in Naperville, Illinois, member of the Ghost Unit
- Mike Meyerheim, born in New Jersey, director of the Lone Soldier Center
- Daniel Flesch, Senior Policy Analyst, Middle East and North Africa, Allison Center for National Security, The Heritage Foundation
- David Meyers, tech entrepreneur and co-founder of Israeli Americans for Kamala
- Jay Ruderman, philanthropist from Boston, serves as liaison between the IDF and Diaspora Jewry

== Politicians ==
- Brian Mast, US Representative (R-FL)
- Naftali Bennet, former Prime Minister of Israel
- John Hans Krebs, German-born Israeli-American, US Representative (D-CA), volunteered for Haganah, a Jewish paramilitary group that supported the creation of an Israeli state and precursor organization to the IDF
- Amos Hochstein, United States Special Envoy and Coordinator for International Energy Affairs
- Michael Oren, former Israeli Ambassador to the United States (served in the IDF in 1979, prior to renouncing US citizenship in 2009)
- Yechiel Leiter, born in Scranton, Pennsylvania, current Israeli Ambassador to the United States
- Daniel Norber, Member of the New York State Assembly from the 16th district, former IDF staff sergeant
- Mazi Melesa Pilip, Member of the Nassau County Legislature from the 10th district, dual US and Israeli citizen, served in the IDF's 35th Paratroopers Brigade
- Baruch Marzel, Kahanist politician who served in the army during the 1982 Lebanon war
- Rachel Azaria, Israeli politician

== Journalists and media ==
- Avi Mayer, former editor of The Jerusalem Post, born in New York, served in the IDF as a spokesperson to international media
- Zvika Klein, editor of The Jerusalem Post, born in Chicago, served in the IDF spokesperson unit as founder and head of the religious and haredi desk
- Gil Hoffman, Israeli-American journalist and political correspondent for HonestReporting
- Hillel Fuld, tech bloger
- Jeffrey Goldberg, American journalist and editor-in-chief of The Atlantic
- Carrie Keller-Lynn, writer for The Wall Street Journal, former political and legal correspondent for The Times of Israel
- Aliza Landes, American-born daughter of the historian Richard Landes, founded the IDF digital media initiative, member of the IDF's Spokesperson's Unit
- Marissa Streit, CEO of conservative media organization PragerU, born in Los Angeles and served in the IDF's military intelligence Unit 8200
- Eitan Fischberger, raised in New York and New Jersey, international relations and Middle East analyst, author of a Substack called Fisch Files, former IDF air force technician
- Caroline Glick, Houston-born journalist and author, advisor to Prime Minister of Israel Benjamin Netanyahu, IDF captain from 1994 to 1996

== Businesspeople ==
- Miriam Adelson, dual American-Israeli citizen, served for two years in the IDF
- Daniel Lewin (14 May 1970–11 September 2001) Founder of Akamai Technologies, veteran of Sayeret Matkal (an elite counter-terrorism unit), and the "first" person killed in the attack on the World Trade Center. (Note: He was stabbed before the crash, and is often reported as the "first victim", but may have been preceded by others.) He was on American Airlines Flight 11, seated between Mohamed Atta and Satam al-Suqami, near Abdulaziz Alomari.
- Adam Milstein, dual American-Israeli citizen, served in the IDF in the Yom Kippur War
- Adam Neumann, co-founder of WeWork

== Other ==
- Hersh Goldberg-Polin, Israeli-American hostage killed in the Gaza war
- Mickey Marcus, American colonel and the first modern Israeli general
- Baruch Goldstein, Brooklyn-born religious extremist and mass murderer who committed the Cave of the Patriarchs massacre, killing 29 Palestinians
- Arie Hasit, early Facebook user and associate dean of the Schechter Rabbinical Seminary
- Eli Wininger, IDF reservist from Los Angeles who filmed himself running a marathon around a military outpost in Gaza
- Moshe Yedidia Leiter, dual American-Israel citizen and son of Israeli Ambassador to the United States Yechiel Leiter, killed in Gaza in 2023
- Neria Leiter, dual American-Israel citizen and son of Israeli Ambassador to the United States Yechiel Leiter, injured during an attack at a West Bank checkpoint in 2023

== See also ==
- Lone soldier
