= Lone soldier =

Soldier without immediate family in Israel

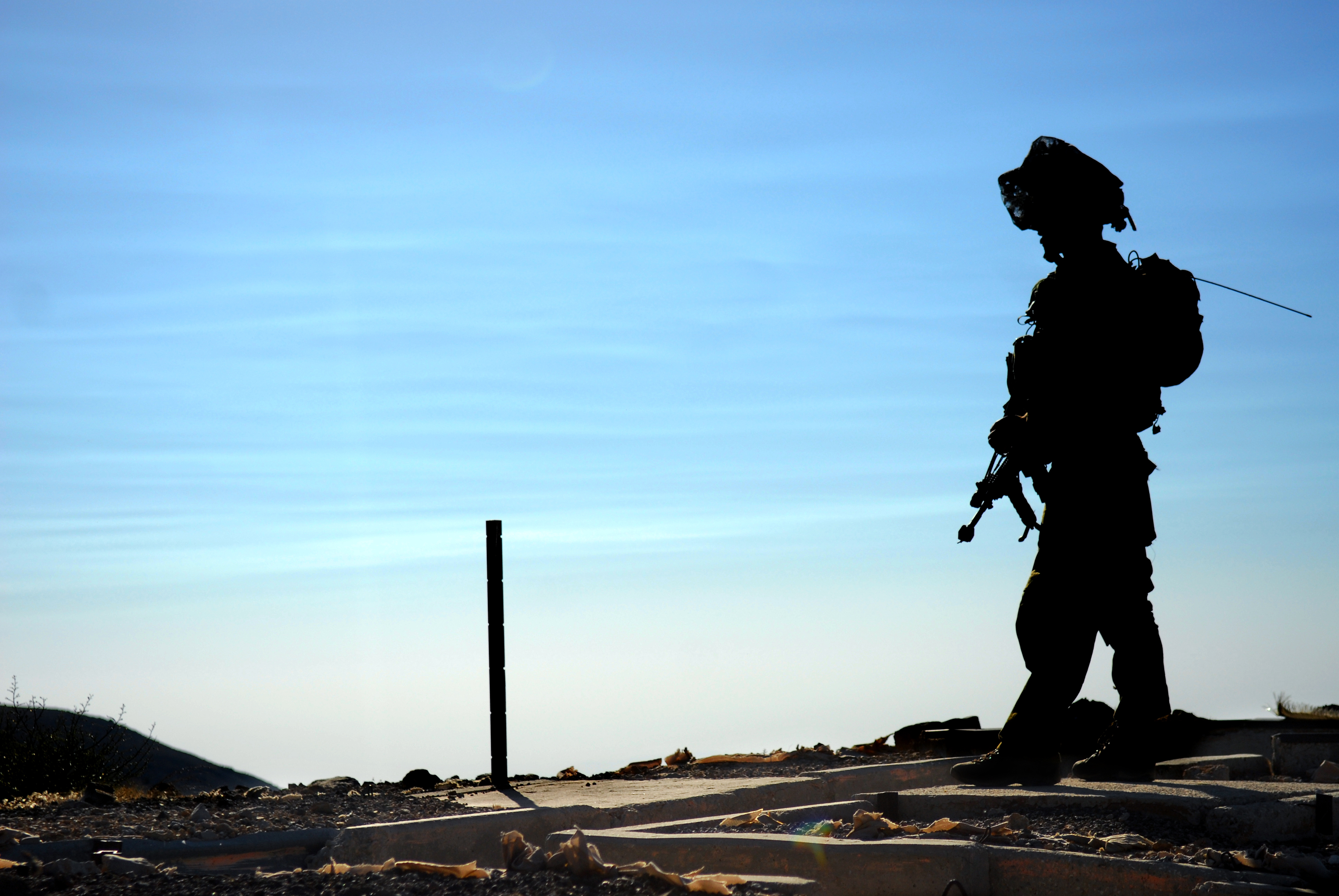
A soldier of the Israel Defense Forces (IDF). The IDF's ranks include "lone soldiers" from across the world.

A lone soldier (Hebrew: חַיָּל בּוֹדֵד, Ḥayal Boded) is a member of the Israel Defense Forces (IDF) who does not have support in Israel, either because they do not have immediate family in Israel or they are estranged from their family in Israel. Lone soldiers serve in regular IDF units, including combat units, and receive special entitlements from the IDF, Israeli government ministries, and charity organizations, such as increased salaries, housing assistance, and additional leave. As of June 2022, there were approximately 7,000 lone soldiers from over 60 countries.

== Background ==
Lone soldiers are generally either non-Israelis of Jewish background volunteering under the Mahal or Tzofim Garin Tzabar programmes or immigrants under the Law of Return, although other possibilities exist (e.g., orphaned natives). According to an IDF spokeswoman, 8,217 personnel born outside Israel enlisted between 2009 and August 2012. The most represented countries of origin were Russia and the United States, with 1,685 and 1,661 recruits respectively. As of 2025, approximately 3,500 people who made aliyah enlisted in the IDF each year.

Lone soldiers
Year	Number	Details	References
2005	2,500	80% from the former Soviet Union	
2011	5,000		
2014	2,800	One-third from the United States and Canada, of the 5,100 immigrants in the IDF	
2022	7,000	From over 60 countries	

Where a soldier's parents live in Israel, but he or she is not in contact with them, it is possible for him or her to be designated an "irregular lone soldier". In early 2011, The Jerusalem Post reported that about 46% of the approximately 5,000 lone soldiers in the military at that time had family in Israel but were estranged from them. An IDF adviser to lone soldiers told Arutz Sheva in 2012 that most of these were youths from Haredi religious backgrounds, shunned by their families for joining the army. Irregular lone soldier status can also be given if both of an IDF soldier's parents are working abroad for the Israeli government. If a soldier marries while serving in the IDF, he or she loses lone soldier status. A lone soldier's benefits are also at risk if his or her parents themselves move to Israel.

== Notable lone soldiers ==
- Michael Levin, born and raised in Pennsylvania, United States, moved to Israel in 2002, and joined the Paratroopers Brigade of the Israel Defense Forces. He was killed in action during the Second Lebanon War on 1 August 2006 in the Battle of Ayta ash-Shab. Levin's death received a great deal of attention; over 2,000 people attended his funeral on Mount Herzl in Jerusalem. Levin had told of an idea for a center for lone soldiers which would provide them with meals, support, and advice. With the support of Tziki Aud, a Jewish Agency employee who had known Levin, a group of former lone soldiers established the Lone Soldier Center in memory of Michael Levin in 2009.
- Max Steinberg, Sean Carmeli, and Jordan Bensemhoun, killed in the Battle of Shuja'iyya during the 2014 Israel-Gaza conflict
- Edan Alexander and Omer Neutra, taken hostage during the October 7 attacks
- Jeffrey Goldberg, American journalist and editor-in-chief of The Atlantic
- Gil Hoffman, Israeli-American journalist and political correspondent for HonestReporting

== Benefits ==
Beginning in 2001, the Jewish Agency for Israel ran Keshet, which flew the parents of lone soldiers to Israel for one week.

By 2014, the Ministry of Aliyah and Integration allocated approximately $5 million to support immigrants in the IDF.

In December 2024, the Saban Family Lone Soldier Home planned to open in Rishon LeZion, Israel, to provide housing for more than 200 lone soldiers. In February 2025, Nefesh B'Nefesh, Friends of the Israel Defense Forces, and Sheba Medical Center announced the launch of the Lone Soldiers Program Resilience Center at the Nefesh B'Nefesh offices in Tel Aviv. The center would provide mental health care free of charge to all international lone soldiers.

The The Michael Levin Base, established in Jerusalem in February 2020, provides practical and emotional support to lone soldiers and lone b'not sherut (national service volunteers). It is the only organization in Israel serving both populations.

== Criticism ==
In February 2025, Canadian news website The Maple's opinion editor Davide Mastracci launched Find IDF Soldiers, a website compiling publicly available information about Canadian lone soldiers in the IDF.The list's publication was condemned by Israel's consul-general in Montreal. Mastracci subsequently launched a website highlighting what role Canadian institutions might play in promoting the IDF and Israel, "GTA [Greater Toronto Area] to IDF". Following a June 2025 announcement by the Royal Canadian Mounted Police into "matters related to the Israel-Hamas armed conflict," with the possibility of uncovering "a perpetrator of core international crimes — such as genocide, war crimes, or crimes against humanity," Canadian soldiers serving in the IDF listed on the Find IDF Soldiers website sought legal assistance.

In July 2025, American conservative media personality Tucker Carlson called for Americans who serve in the IDF to have their citizenship stripped due to concerns of dual loyalty. In a speech at Turning Point USA Student Action Summit in Tampa, Florida, Carlson said "There are a lot of Americans who've served in the IDF — they should lose their citizenship," adding, "you can't fight for another country and remain an American, period."

In September 2025, The Guardian published an investigation showing American-born IDF lone soldier Daniel Raab shot and killed 19-year-old Salem Doghmosh on November 22, 2023. Salem was unarmed and Raab noted he shot him because he was trying to retrieve the body of his older brother Mohammed. On September 11, 2025, the Council on American‑Islamic Relations (CAIR‑Chicago) issued a statement demanding the US Department of Justice open a criminal investigation under the War Crimes Act against Raab. Raab was a member of the 9th Platoon of the Auxiliary Company of the 202nd Battalion of the Israeli army's Paratrooper Brigade, also known as the Ghost Unit, an elite 21-member unit of snipers active during the Gaza War. Many members of the unit are dual nationals of Israel and other countries.

== See also ==
- List of Americans in the Israel Defense Forces
