= Ruderman =

Ruderman is a surname. Notable people with the surname include:

- Arcady Ruderman (1955–1992), Belarusian documentary filmmaker
- Jay Ruderman (born 1966), American activist and philanthropist
- Laura Ruderman (born 1970), former Washington State Representative for Washington's 45th legislative district
- Malvin Ruderman (born 1927), American astrophysicist
- Yaakov Yitzchok Ruderman (1900–1987), Talmudic scholar and rabbi

== See also ==
- Ruderman Family Foundation, a U.S. private philanthropic foundation
