= Lebanon War Powers Resolution =

2026 United States concurrent resolution

United States Congress
- Long title: Directing the President pursuant to section 5(c) of the War Powers Resolution to remove United States Armed Forces from Lebanon.
- Territorial extent: United States
- Enacted by: United States Congress
- Introduced by: Rashida Tlaib (D–MI)
- Introduced: April 13, 2026
- Status: Not passed

H.Con.Res.84, commonly known as the Lebanon War Powers Resolution was a 2026 draft resolution introduced in the United States House of Representatives by representative Rashida Tlaib to "remove United States Armed Forces from Lebanon." The draft noted that "Congress has not declared war with respect to, or provided any specific statutory authorization for, United States military participation in the military action by Israel in Lebanon, and the United States has not designated any actor inside Lebanon under any authorization for use of military force." It was defeated 324 to 91 on June 4, 2026. At that time, there were "no U.S. service-members involved in combat operations or hostilities in Lebanon," according to House Minority Leader Hakeem Jeffries.

== Legislative history ==
On the floor of the House on June 3, 2026, Tlaib said that "The Trump administration is providing intelligence, coordinating strikes and demonstrating overt command over Israeli decisions," adding that the US was an "active participant" in Israel's "ethnic cleansing campaign" and "war crimes."

The resolution was defeated on June 4, 2026. The vote came a day after the House of Representatives voted in favor of an Iran War Powers Resolution limiting the president's use of force in the 2026 Iran War. House Democratic leadership noted the lack of US service members involved in combat in Lebanon before the vote.

During the vote, Representative Max Miller accused Tlaib of supporting terrorism, saying, "Hezbollah is a terrorist organization ... and its members are butchers that you like to hang out with to a certain extent," adding "You advocate for terrorists on a daily basis." Miller's remarks were subsequently stricken from the record.

Jeffries subsequently advocated for the passage of a H.Con.Res.108, a new War Powers Resolution introduced by Tlaib on June 3, 2026. H.Con.Res.108 directs the president to remove US armed forces from Lebanon, and adds "Nothing in this concurrent resolution may be construed to prevent or limit security cooperation with the Lebanese Armed Forces or the protection of diplomatic facilities."
