= Media Watch =

Media Watch or MediaWatch may refer to:

- Media Watch (TV program), an Australian television program
- Media Watch International, a United States–based lobby group
- Mediawatch-UK, a United Kingdom–based lobby group
- A segment on the Australian television program Hey Hey It's Saturday

== See also ==
- Palestine Media Watch
- Palestinian Media Watch
- Trans Media Watch (TMW), a British charity
- Watchdog journalism (Media watch group)
