= Ghost Unit =

Ghost Unit may refer to:

== Military and police units ==
- Ghost Unit (Israel Defense Forces), a sniper unit active during the Gaza War
- Multidimensional Unit, or "Refaim" Unit (lit. 'Ghost Unit'), an Israel Defense Forces Special Operations task force
- Ghost Units, black-bag teams operated by the Garda National Surveillance Unit of Ireland

== Music ==
- Ghost Unit, a 2005 mixtape by The Game
