= The Michael Levin Base =

Israeli nonprofit supporting lone soldiers and national service volunteers

- Formation: February 2020
- Founders: Richard Corman, Bonnie Rosenbaum, Lizzie Noach
- Type: Non-profit organization
- Registration no.: 580696094
- Legal status: Registered charity
- Purpose: Support for lone soldiers and national service volunteers
- Headquarters: 4 Eliyahu Mani Street, Jerusalem, Israel
- Region served: Israel (primarily Jerusalem)
- Co-Directors: Bonnie Rosenbaum, Lizzie Noach
- Website: themichaellevinbase.org

The Michael Levin Base is an Israeli non-profit organization based in Jerusalem. Founded in February 2020, it supports lone soldiers serving in the Israel Defense Forces (IDF) and lone b'nei sherut, the young men and women performing National Service (Sherut Leumi) away from their families. The organization is named after Michael Levin, an American-born lone soldier from the Philadelphia area killed during the Second Lebanon War in 2006.

== Background ==
Michael Levin (1984–2006) grew up in Holland, Pennsylvania, near Philadelphia, and moved to Israel in 2002, where he served as a lone soldier in the IDF's Paratroopers Brigade. When the Second Lebanon War broke out in 2006, he was in Philadelphia for a wedding; he chose to return to Israel and rejoin his unit, and was killed in action in Lebanon on August 1, 2006, at the age of 22.

According to his parents, when Levin first arrived in Israel he spent two nights sleeping on a park bench, with no organization in place to help him. He often spoke of his wish to create a support system for lone soldiers once his service ended. His parents, Mark and Harriet Levin, later established the Michael Levin Lone Soldier Foundation, a US-based foundation that supports lone soldier organizations and projects in Israel.

== History ==
Michael Levin's parents asked Richard Corman to establish the organization, requesting that it bear their son's name and that Bonnie Rosenbaum and Lizzie Noach be involved; Rosenbaum and Noach became its co-directors. The Levins also asked that two Israelis serve on its board: Michael's military commander Gilad, and a close friend named Ori. The Michael Levin Base was founded by volunteers and professionals who had previously worked with the lone soldier community, and opened in February 2020 at 10 Hadekel Street, near the Mahane Yehuda Market. Its founders raised $100,000 to make the organization operational within four months, and it launched around Purim 2020. Within weeks of opening, the COVID-19 pandemic forced it to shift to distributing food, including Passover packages and Shabbat take-away meals, and its activities remained limited and socially distanced through much of its first year. The organization served 600 young men and women per year in its first year of operation; by 2024 that had grown to over 2,300 per year. As of 2024, all 16 members of its board served as volunteers.

In July 2021, marking 15 years since their son's death, Mark and Harriet Levin visited the Base in person for the first time, joining nearly 100 lone soldiers and staff for an evening event.

In early 2023, the Base moved around the corner to a larger, 210-square-meter facility at 4 Eliyahu Mani Street. Its largest room is double the size of the previous one, allowing it to host 80 to 90 people for Shabbat events instead of 40 to 45. Jerusalem Deputy Mayor Fleur Hassan-Nahoum spoke at the reopening.

In March 2025, The Michael Levin Base received the Jerusalem Mayor's Volunteer Award, presented each year on Good Deeds Day (Yom Maasei Hesed).

In June 2026, The Michael Levin Base opened a branch in Tel Aviv, and that September it launched Habayit, a partnership serving religious lone b'not sherut and female lone soldiers. At its annual gala at the Jerusalem Theatre in October 2026, titled "Three Years Since Oct. 7: Where Are We Today?", the organization announced that its Jerusalem center would move in early 2027 to a larger, permanent facility at 206 Jaffa Road. The new center is expected to more than double the number of lone soldiers and b'not sherut it can host for Shabbat meals and other events. As of 2026, the organization reported serving approximately 3,600 young men and women per year.

== Mission and services ==
The Michael Levin Base serves lone soldiers and lone b'nei sherut, whether they came to Israel from abroad or grew up there, including Israeli-born lone soldiers who are orphans or whose parents do not live in Israel, as well as soldiers from new immigrant families. The five pillars of its programming are pre-army and national service assistance, new immigrant services, post-service support, social events and activities, and support for parents of lone soldiers and b'not sherut.

Regular programming includes Shabbat meals on Friday nights and Saturdays, a Friday morning breakfast, and Thursday evening events such as movie nights and trivia nights, open to current, former and pre-draft lone soldiers and b'not sherut, as well as holiday celebrations. The Base also offers advising before, during and after service, including post-service help with finding work and integrating into Israeli society; therapy sessions; laundry facilities; a communal kitchen with a coffee bar; and a store of personal necessities offered at low cost. In 2021, the Base asked for a donation of NIS 5 per item from the store, waived for those who could not afford it. It also provides information and support for parents of lone soldiers and lone b'not sherut.

The Michael Levin Base extends its services to b'not sherut, female national service volunteers who are not IDF soldiers. Co-director Lizzie Noach told The Jerusalem Post in 2021 that earlier organizations named for Levin had not served b'not sherut, and that this work had become the focus of the Base.

== Relationship to other Michael Levin organizations ==
The Michael Levin Base is separate from the Lone Soldier Center in Memory of Michael Levin, an earlier organization also named after Levin.

The Michael Levin Lone Soldier Foundation, created by Levin's parents, provided the majority of the Base's funding in its early years.

== Operation Swords of Iron ==
After the Hamas-led attack on Israel on October 7, 2023, and the launch of Operation Swords of Iron, demand for the Base's Shabbat meals increased. Using volunteer cooking brigades, it added weekly Shabbat lunches to its Friday-night dinners, and it now provides eight Shabbat meals each month. Its 2023 programming also included Thanksgiving dinner deliveries to army bases. The Jerusalem Post wrote that b'not sherut, many of whom continued working in Jerusalem's hospitals and schools during the war, had the aid of only a handful of organizations, including The Michael Levin Base. Within a week of the attack, the Michael Levin Lone Soldier Foundation sent 41 pallets of supplies to Israel on a full El Al plane, including socks, underwear, sleeping bags and 70 showers, for all IDF soldiers, not only lone soldiers.

== See also ==
- Michael Levin (soldier)
- Lone soldier
- Lone Soldier Center
