= Max Steinberg (soldier) =

American-Israeli soldier (1990–2014)

- מקס שטיינברג
- Born: November 27, 1989; Los Angeles, California, US
- Died: July 20, 2014 (aged 24); Shuja'iyya, Gaza City
- Burial place: Mt. Herzl in Jerusalem, Israel's national cemetery 31°46′26″N 35°10′50″E
- Alma mater: Los Angeles Pierce College
- Military career
- Allegiance: Israel
- Service: Israel Defense Forces
- Rank: Sergeant
- Units: Gideon Battalion, Golani Brigade
- Known for: Lone soldier sharpshooter killed in the Gaza Strip
- War: 2014 Gaza War (Operation Protective Edge) †

Max Donald Steinberg (Hebrew: מקס שטיינברג; November 27, 1989 – July 20, 2014) was an American-Israeli soldier in the Israel Defense Forces killed in the Gaza Strip during the 2014 Gaza War. A lone soldier, his funeral in Israel was attended by over 30,000 people, including the U.S. ambassador to Israel.

== Early life and move to Israel ==
Max Donald Steinberg, son of Stuart and Evelyn (Evie) Steinberg, was born in Los Angeles, California, and grew up in Woodland Hills, Los Angeles, in the San Fernando Valley, and was Jewish. He graduated from El Camino Real High School and Los Angeles Pierce College. He first visited Israel in June 2012 on a Birthright Israel trip.

He then returned to Israel in September 2012, to make aliyah in December 2012 and to join the Israel Defense Forces (IDF) as a lone soldier. In Israel, Steinberg lived in Beersheba and was a sharpshooter in the Gideon Battalion of the Golani Brigade from early 2013. He was one of 6,000 lone soldiers without family in Israel, 1,100 of whom were from the United States.

== Death, funeral, and legacy ==
On July 20, 2014, Steinberg and six members of the Golani Brigade were riding in an armored personnel carrier in Shuja'iyya, Gaza City, during the Battle of Shuja'iyya in the fourth day of Operation Protective Edge (the 2014 Gaza War), when it was hit by explosives laid by the Palestinian militant group Hamas, and the stalled vehicle was hit by a Hamas anti-tank missile. He was killed, along with six other IDF soldiers. According to the Israeli government, Steinberg's unit had been attempting to locate Gaza Strip smuggling tunnels in Shuja'iyya that were being used by Hamas. Steinberg and another American-Israeli lone soldier Nissim "Sean" Carmeli were among 13 IDF soldiers killed during the initial clashes between Israel and Hamas in Gaza in July 2014.

Steinberg's funeral was held on Mt. Herzl in Jerusalem, Israel's national cemetery, on July 23, 2015. It was attended by approximately 30,000 people. At the funeral, U.S. ambassador to Israel Dan Shapiro gave a eulogy on behalf of the United States. Hours before the funeral, U.S. secretary of state John Kerry had met with Israeli prime minister Benjamin Netanyahu, United Nations Secretary-General Ban Ki-moon, and Palestinian Authority President Mahmoud Abbas in Tel Aviv to negotiate a ceasefire. Kerry also met with Steinberg's family in Israel.

Upon hearing that Steinberg was a fan of the New England Patriots, businessman and team owner Robert Kraft wrote a letter to the family offering his condolences.

Americans for Ben-Gurion University established the Max Steinberg Memorial Scholarship Endowment Fund, to commemorate his service by providing full scholarships to Ben-Gurion University for IDF combat reservists in perpetuity, with preference going to lone soldiers. In July 2015, Birthright Israel dedicated a memorial site to Steinberg at the site of the ancient synagogue of Arbel, Israel.

== See also ==
- Lone Soldier Center, a grass-roots Israeli non-profit founded by former lone soldiers to support the lone soldiers serving in the Israel Defense Forces
- Michael Levin, lone soldier killed during the Second Lebanon War in 2006
