= H.R. 8445 (118th Congress) =

Proposed United States legislative bill

- Long title: To amend title 38, United States Code, and the Servicemembers Civil Relief Act to provide for the eligibility of United States citizens who serve in the Israeli Defense Forces for certain protections relating to such service.

Legislative history
- Introduced in the House of Representatives by Representatives Guy Reschenthaler (R-PA) and Max Miller (R-OH) on May 17, 2024; Committee consideration by United States House Committee on Veterans' Affairs

H.R. 8445 was a proposed Act of Congress introduced in 2024 by representatives Guy Reschenthaler (R-PA) and Max Miller (R-OH) that would amend federal law to "provide for the eligibility of United States citizens who serve in the Israel Defense Forces for certain protections relating to such service."

In their official statement, Reschenthaler and Miller wrote that the Act would "extend the benefits of the Servicemembers Civil Relief Act (SCRA) and Uniformed Services Employment and Reemployment Rights Act (USERRA) to American citizens serving in the Israel Defense Forces."

== Background ==
As of February 2024, 23,380 American citizens were serving in the Israeli Army, many of them settlers in Israel, with some reservists living in the United States having been called to fight in the Gaza War.

== Legislative history ==
H.R. 8445 was introduced in May 2024. It was subsequently referred to the Veterans’ Affairs subcommittee in July 2024.

== Reaction ==
Responsible Statecraft wrote that the Act would treat Americans serving in the Israel Defense Forces "In other words, no different than U.S. National Guardsman or Reservists, they are just fighting for another country."

== See also ==
- Israel–United States relations
- List of Americans in the Israel Defense Forces
