= Younis Tirawi =

Palestinian journalist

- Occupation: Journalist
- Employer: Bellingcat; Ma'an News Agency

Younis Tirawi (Arabic: يونس الطيراوي, romanized: Yūnus Aṭ-Ṭīrāwī) is a Palestinian journalist known for his investigative reporting concerning security and political affairs in the Occupied Palestinian Territories. His recent work has focused on tracking social media accounts of Israeli soldiers, earning him recognition during the Gaza–Israel war. The findings of his investigations are notably cited by the South African Team at the ICJ in its legal case against Israel accusing it of genocide.

== Biography ==
Tirawi began his reporting in 2021 following "Operation Guardian of the Walls", covering Palestinian armed groups in the West Bank and Israeli military operations in the Palestinian Territories over the past few years. In addition to his security coverage, Tirawi also reports on political affairs, having covered the Palestinian reconciliation efforts between Fatah and Hamas and interviewed several Palestinian officials over the years.

In 2022 and 2023 Tirawi reported extensively on daily Israeli incursions into West Bank villages, reflecting on the security situation there. In October 2023, Israeli Channel 14 described Tirawi as a journalist delivering reports from "enemy territories" and noted that he has been covering the Palestinian issue for three years. They also mentioned that he has sources within armed organizations in Jenin, such as "The Lions' Den".

== Career ==
During the Gaza-Israel conflict that erupted on October 7, 2023, Tirawi provided daily reports from Gaza and the West Bank. His work has been a vital source of information verification for several international news agencies

The findings of his investigative work have been notably cited by the South African team in an ongoing case at the International Court of Justice (ICJ) in The Hague, where South Africa has accused Israel of committing genocide in Gaza [12]. Tembeka Ngcukaitobi, a member of the South African legal team, argued for Israel's genocidal intent, quoting Tirawi's journalistic work on numerous occasions during the hearings on May 16 and January 11.

=== Coverage of war crimes ===
In early February 2024 Tirawi revealed a photo showing an injured and handcuffed Palestinian man, stripped to his underwear, looking directly into the face of a fully-clad Israeli soldier standing over him. The picture became one of the most widespread images at that time, with some describing it as "a symbol of resistance", according to observers from France24 Press. The IDF responded to the picture that one of their soldiers published it in violation of "the Israeli army's orders and values", adding that following the incident, "he recently decided to end his service".

During the same month Tirawi published an investigative article on Bellingcat that revealed dozens of videos showing the humiliation of Palestinian detainees, including scenes of detainees cloaked in Israeli flags and having money thrown at them. Following this exposure, Israel opened an investigation into the matter and stated that "disciplinary or command measures" were taken against the soldiers involved, adding that "those incidents that were not known before the Bellingcat report are now under review".

Since the start of the war Tirawi has revealed dozens of posts showing Israeli troops in Gaza displaying lingerie, mannequins, and in some cases both. Tirawi's investigative work was mentioned by Reuters in an article titled "Israeli Soldiers Playing with Gaza Women's Underwear in Online Posts" who also sourced the images and videos to Reuters. The Israeli military responded to Reuters' article, stating that "it is concluded that the expression or behavior of the soldiers in the video is inappropriate, and it is handled accordingly".

In May 2024 Washington Post revealed that Israel appears to be using Gaza's cancer hospital as a military base based on some of Tirawi's findings The footage were verified by the post confirming that Israeli soldiers were using the hospital as a military base including a sniper position. Tirawi posted later documentation showing ammunition being stored at the TIKA hospital in Netzarim.

In the same month, Tirawi uncovered an Israeli soldier burning the Central Library of the Al-Aqsa University in Gaza City, the Israeli military Police opened a probe into the incident.

In June 2024, Tirawi had revealed that Israeli troops burned the Rafah Crossing Departure Hall. Later, in July 2024, Tirawi also revealed that Israeli troops in the city of Rafah, south of the strip, had blown up one of the city's main water reservoirs located in Tel Sultan Neighborhood. The Haaretz daily reported that the incident was being investigated by the Israeli Military Police as a suspected violation of international law.

In October 2024, Tirawi published another investigation in the U.S.-based Drop Site News, focusing on IDF combat engineering battalion 749 reportedly central to establishing the "Netzarim Corridor" following the Israel-Gaza war that began on October 7, 2023. The report examined the unit's operations and composition, including statements from soldiers and officers using inflammatory rhetoric, such as describing their mission as "to flatten Gaza" and that no one will stop them. Following Tirawi's investigation, the IDF combat engineering battalion went under the radar, removing their page and social media accounts from public view.

=== Investigation of Dual-Nationals in the IDF ===
In March 2024 Younis's investigative work also caused a diplomatic incident between France and Israel, prompting the French Foreign Ministry to announce its intention to pursue legal action against any French-Israeli soldiers implicated in alleged war crimes within the Gaza Strip. The decision came after Tirawi revealed a video showing Palestinian detainees being taunted and mistreated, with one video specifically showing a soldier mocking the detainees and highlighting their injuries, stating, "They tortured him to make him talk. Did you see his back?" The video first appeared in a WhatsApp group for French Jews. Tirawi, had infiltrated the group, identified the uploader and the soldier in question, sharing conversations that purportedly confirmed the perpetrator's identity.

Later that month Tirawi's work in revealing social media posts from Israeli soldiers' accounts caused another diplomatic incident between Thailand and Israel. Tirawi had posted an image showing an Israeli soldier holding the Thai national flag in front of piles of debris in Khan Younis. The Thai Embassy in Tel Aviv protested the matter with Israel and instructed Israeli officials to exercise caution to prevent any recurrence of such incidents. An Israeli official informed the Thai embassy back then that "the soldier's action was inappropriate and the Israeli army has been asked to investigate the matter".

==== Ghost Unit investigation ====
In October 2024, Younis Tirawi published an investigative report on his X profile, drawing global attention to an Israeli military sniper team known as the "Ghost" unit. This elite Israeli Defense Forces (IDF) team, reportedly active in Gaza since October 2023, includes many dual nationals from different countries, including American-born Daniel Raab and German-born Daniel Graetz. The unit has gained notoriety due to allegations of war crimes, including the execution of unarmed civilians in Gaza.

Following Tirawi's exposure, South Africa and Belgium each initiated war crimes investigations later that month against members of the Ghost Unit sniper team. These inquiries focused on two soldiers, each holding dual nationality—one from South Africa and one from Belgium—due to allegations surrounding their actions in Gaza.

== Reception ==
In April 2024 Israeli Channel 13 aired a thorough report on its TV program "Pipeline", about on Younis Tirawi and his investigative journalism, accusing him of "shaming soldiers" and stating that his posts "serve Hamas". The report claimed that Tirawi's work had caused "a severe diplomatic incident in France related to Israeli-French soldiers, prompting the French Foreign Ministry to threaten legal action against the soldiers involved in alleged war crimes". The Israeli report further more alleged that Tirawi was leading attacks on Israeli soldiers on X (formerly Twitter), depicting them in problematic situations. Tirawi was described as "exhibiting deep expertise in Israeli intelligence".

Ahead of the Israeli Channel 13 report in April, Younis Tirawi raised concerns about a defamation attempt against him by some Israeli media outlets and accounts inciting against him. Following the Israeli report, The Committee to Protect Journalists issued a statement expressing extreme concern about the disinformation and incitement campaigns targeting the Palestinian journalist and held Israeli authorities responsible for ensuring the safety of Younis Tirawi and his family.
