= Shalev Menashe =

Israeli footballer

Shalev Menashe שלו מנשה
Personal information
- Full name: Shalev Menashe
- Date of birth: 23 May 1982 (age 44)
- Place of birth: Rishon LeZion, Israel
- Height: 1.79 m (5 ft 10 in)
- Position: Midfielder

Senior career*
Years	Team	Apps	(Gls)
2000–2002	Ironi Rishon Letzion	52	(5)
2002–2003	Maccabi Petah Tikva	31	(2)
2004–2007	Hapoel Kfar Saba	59	(8)
2007–2008	Maccabi Herzliya	28	(4)
2008–2010	Maccabi Netanya	60	(15)
2010–2013	Bnei Yehuda	90	(10)
2013–2015	Maccabi Netanya	30	(1)

International career
2000–2002	Israel U21	4	(0)
- * Club domestic league appearances and goals as of 16 June 2010

Shalev Menashe (Hebrew: שלו מנשה; born 23 May 1982) is a retired Israeli footballer who last played at Maccabi Netanya.

== Career ==
Menashe started his senior career with Ironi Rishon Letzion a small club in the Israeli Premier League, but after two solid seasons in Rishon where he helped the team avoid relegation he made a move to Maccabi Petah Tikva. However, his time at Maccabi was unsuccessful when he only played one season.

In 2004, he signed a deal with Hapoel Kfar Saba from Liga Leumit and in his first season with them he won the league and after 3 years with Kfar Saba he moved to Maccabi Herzliya there he only played one season after the team faced relegation.

In June 2008 Menashe signed a 1-year deal with Maccabi Netanya, this was the first time he was a part of a top club in Israel and so far his time in Netanya is proving to be his finest. In his debut season he was the top goalscorer and also made the most assists with 8 goals and 6 assists and in his second season with the club he scored 7 goals and made 8 assists. He is considered by many fans as the MVP of Netanya in the 2008–09 season. At June 2010, Shalev signed a 3 years contract at Bnei Yehuda.

Menashe was also a part of the Israel U21 squad from 2000 to 2002.

His sister is Shira Ruderman.

== Honours ==
- Liga Leumit
  - Winner (2): 2004–05, 2013–14
- Israel State Cup
  - Runner-up (1): 2014
