= Aaron David Miller =

American Middle East analyst, author, and negotiator

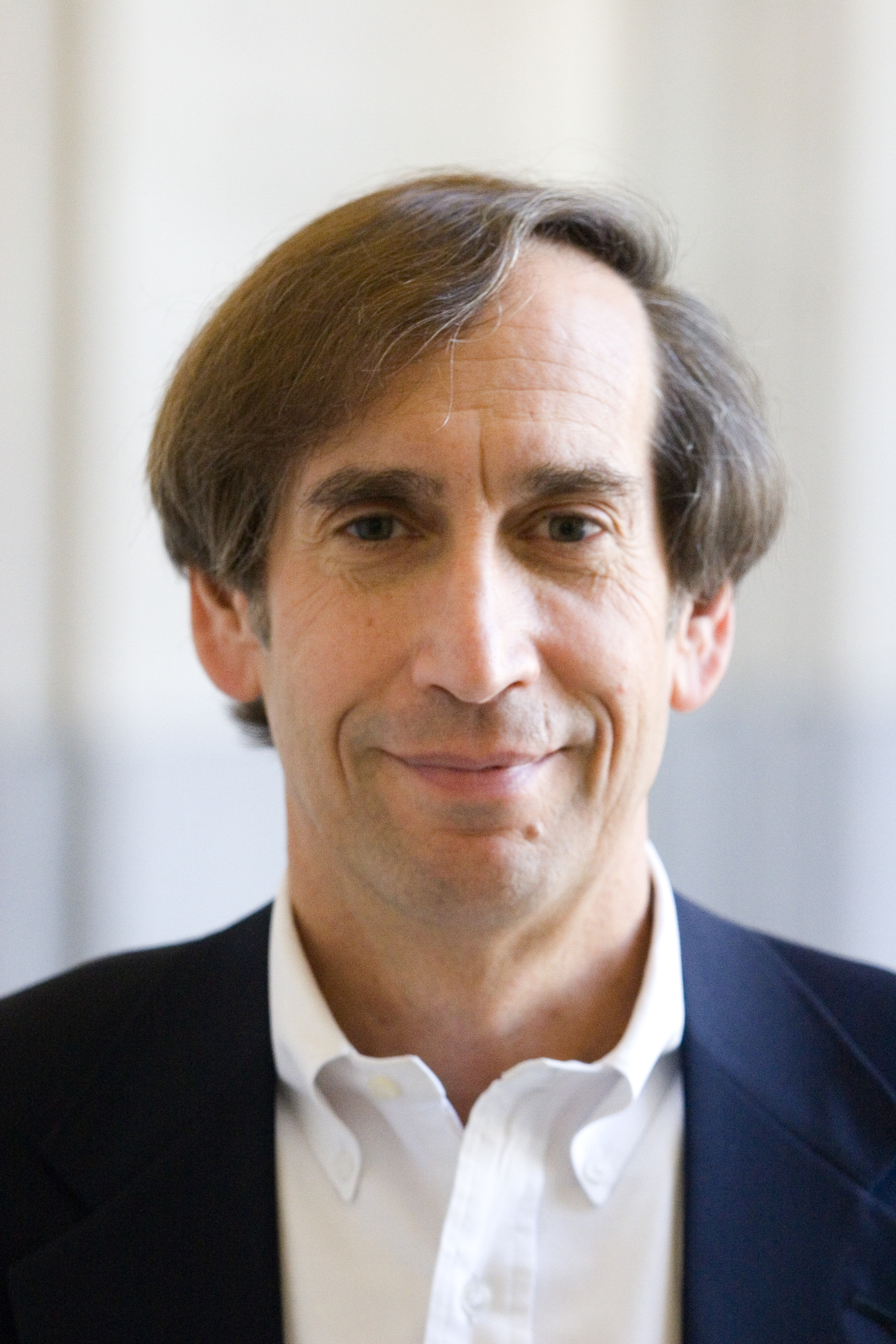
- Miller in 2014
- Born: Cleveland, Ohio, U.S.
- Education: Tulane University (attended); University of Michigan (BA, MA, PhD)
- Spouse: Lindsay
- Children: 2
- Relatives: Sam Miller (father); Max Miller (nephew)
- Writing career
- Period: 1980–present
- Subjects: Middle East policy and analysis

Aaron David Miller is an American Middle East analyst, author, and negotiator. He is a senior fellow at the Carnegie Endowment for International Peace, focusing on U.S. foreign policy. He previously was vice president for new initiatives at the Woodrow Wilson International Center for Scholars, and has been an advisor to both Republican and Democratic secretaries of state. He is a Global Affairs Analyst for CNN.

Miller worked for the United States Department of State for 24 years (1978–2003). Between 1988 and 2003, Miller served six secretaries of state as an advisor on Arab-Israeli negotiations, participating in American efforts to broker agreements between Israel, Jordan, Syria, and the Palestinians. He left the State Department in January 2003 to serve as president of Seeds of Peace, an international youth organization founded in 1993. In January 2006, Miller joined the Woodrow Wilson International Center for Scholars in Washington, D.C., first as public policy scholar, and later as vice president for new initiatives. In 2014, Miller published his fifth book, The End of Greatness: Why America Can't Have (and Doesn't Want) Another Great President.

== Early life and education ==
Miller was born to a Jewish family in Cleveland, Ohio, the eldest son of Ruth (née Ratner) and Samuel H. Miller. He attended Shaker Heights High School, graduating in 1967.

Miller began his undergraduate career at Tulane University and spent a semester at the University of Warwick on a history honors exchange program before graduating from the University of Michigan with a B.A. in 1971. Continuing on toward an M.A. in American Civil War history, Miller changed fields to Middle Eastern and American diplomacy and spent 1973 to 1974 in Jerusalem studying Arabic and Hebrew. He completed his PhD in 1977. His dissertation, Search for Security: Saudi Arabian Oil and American Foreign Policy, 1939–1949 was published by the University of North Carolina Press in 1980, and in paperback in 1991.

== Government career ==
Miller entered the Department of State in November 1978 as an historian in the Bureau of Public Affairs Office of the Historian, where he edited the documentary series Foreign Relations of the United States. In November 1980, he worked as an analyst for Lebanon and the Palestinians in the State Department's Bureau of Intelligence and Research (INR). Awarded an International Affairs Fellowship by the Council on Foreign Relations, he spent 1982–83 at the Center for Strategic and International Studies and the CFR in New York, where he wrote his second book, The PLO and the Politics of Survival. The following year he returned to INR and served a temporary tour at the U.S. Embassy in Amman, Jordan, before joining the Secretary of State's Policy Planning Staff in 1985. Between 1985 and 1993, Miller advised Secretaries of State George Shultz and James Baker.

He helped Baker plan the Madrid peace conference of October 1991.

In June 1993, Miller was appointed Deputy Special Middle East Coordinator. For the next seven years, he worked as part of a small interagency team where he helped structure the U.S. role in Arab–Israeli negotiations through the Oslo process, multilateral Arab–Israeli economic summits, the Israeli–Jordanian peace treaty, and final status negotiations between Israel and Syria and between Israel and the Palestinians at Camp David in July 2000. Miller continued work on Arab–Israeli issues in the George W. Bush administration, serving as the senior advisor on Arab–Israeli negotiations in the Bureau of Near Eastern Affairs to Secretary of State Colin Powell. He resigned from the Department of State in January 2003 to become president of Seeds of Peace.

== After government ==
In January 2006, Miller became a Public Policy Scholar at the Woodrow Wilson International Center for Scholars, where he planned and participated in programs on the Middle East and Arab–Israeli issues. In 2008, he completed his fourth book, The Much Too Promised Land: America's Elusive Search for Arab–Israeli Peace, an insider's look based on 160 interviews with former presidents, secretaries of state, Israelis, American Jews, Arabs, and evangelical Christians on why America succeeded and failed in Arab–Israeli diplomacy over the past 40 years.

== Media and public speaking ==
Throughout his career, Miller has made frequent media and speaking appearances as an expert on Arab–Israeli and Middle Eastern issues, including on CNN, PBS, Fox News, the BBC, the CBC, and Al Jazeera.

== Awards ==
Miller has received the Department of State's Distinguished, Meritorious and Superior Honor Awards. In 1998 he was on the U.S. Holocaust Memorial Museum's Governing Council. In 2005, he was awarded the Ellis Island Medal of Honor.

== Personal life ==
Miller lives with his wife, Lindsay. They have two adult children, Jenny and Danny.

== Bibliography ==
=== Books ===
- Search for Security: Saudi Arabian Oil and American Foreign Policy, 1939–1949 (Paperback, University of North Carolina Press, 1991) ISBN 978-0-8078-4324-6
- PLO: Politics of Survival (Paperback, Praeger Press, 1983) ISBN 978-0-275-91583-4
- The Arab States and the Palestine Question: Between Ideology and Self-Interest (Paperback, Praeger Press, 1986) ISBN 978-0-275-92216-0
- The Much Too Promised Land: America’s Elusive Search for Arab-Israeli Peace (Hardcover, Bantam Books, 2008) ISBN 978-0-553-80490-4
- The End of Greatness: Why America Can't Have (and Doesn't Want) Another Great President (Hardcover, Palgrave Macmillan, 2014) ISBN 978-1-137-27900-2

=== Articles ===
- "The Abandonment: How the Bush Administration Left Israelis and Palestinians to Their Fate"
- "Annapolis Is Just the First Step"
- "West Bank First: It Won't Work"
- "For Israel and Hamas, a Case for Accommodation"
- "The Arab-Israeli conflict: Toward an Equitable and Durable Solution"
- "Israel's Lawyer"
