= Shira Ruderman =

American philanthropist (born 1978)

- שירה רודרמן
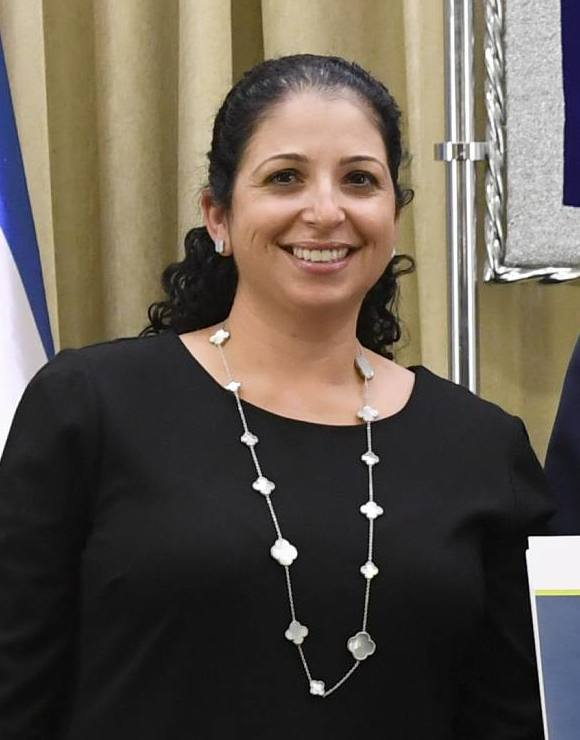
- Shira Ruderman
- Born: Shira Menashe; November 10, 1978 (age 47); Israel
- Occupations: Activist and philanthropist
- Spouse: Jay Ruderman (m. 2002)
- Website: Official website

Shira Menashe Ruderman (Hebrew: שירה מנשה רודרמן; born November 10, 1978) is an Israeli-American activist and philanthropist. Ruderman is the executive director of the Ruderman Family Foundation.

== Biography ==
Shira Ruderman was born in Rishon LeZion, Israel. One of her brothers is Shalev Menashe, a professional Israeli soccer player. During her service in the Israel Defense Forces Shira served as an Arabic-language instructor. She has an undergraduate degree in education and a graduate degree in public policy, both from the Hebrew University of Jerusalem.

In 2013 Ruderman announced her candidacy for the mayorship of Rehovot. She pulled out of the race a few months later.

Ruderman lives in Boston, Massachusetts with her husband, Jay Ruderman and their four children.

== Activism and Philanthropy ==
In 2002 Ruderman founded the Ruderman Family Foundation in Boston, along with her husband Jay. In 2006 they opened their Israel office in order to advance social investments. Through the Foundation, Ruderman focuses her work in two main fields: disability inclusion and strengthening the relationship between Israel and the American Jewish community.

Asked about whether gender affects her work, Ruderman stated: "There were moments over the years when being a woman created challenges for me. Walking into a room of executives or decision-makers and being the only woman can be exhausting at times. You constantly need to prove yourself. But I don’t regret those experiences at all. I think those moments made me stronger and more assertive."

In 2014 she led the Morton E. Ruderman Award in Inclusion, named after her late father in-law. Since its inauguration, it has been awarded to former Senator Tom Harkin (2016), Academy Award winning actress Marlee Matlin (2017), Olympic Medalist Michael Phelps (2018), the Farrelly brothers (2019) and Taraji P. Hanson. Additionally, Ruderman has led efforts to increase the authentic representation of people with disabilities in the entire entertainment industry, working with the Sundance Film Festival, creating the Ruderman 'Seal of Approval' for authentic representation, and more. In 2017 Ruderman established the LINK20 social network, training and promoting social activists with and without disabilities through partnerships with the Massachusetts Institute of Technology and other leading institutions.

In 2011 Ruderman began taking groups of Israeli Knesset Members to the United States for educational tours. The groups have included politicians from different political parties, including Tzipi Livni, Yoav Kisch Amir Ochana and Rachel Azaria. In 2012 Ruderman partnered with a number of Knesset Members, led by Ronit Tirosh, to establish a Knesset Caucus to promote Israel's relationship with the American Jewish Community. In 2013 Ruderman initiated a similar mission for journalists.

In 2013 Ruderman partnered with the University of Haifa to open the first graduate program for American Jewish studies in Israeli academia.

In 2020 Ruderman initiated the 'Civil Forum' along with President of Israel Reuven Rivlin, with the goal of connecting Israelis and American Jews from various disciplines and backgrounds. The inaugural event was held in February 2020, featuring Israel Prize recipient Miriam Peretz, Olympic medalist Arik Ze'evi, Justice Elyakim Rubinstein, award-winning author Nicole Kruass, Harvard President Professor Lawrence Bacow and others.

In 2023, Ruderman was among the initiators of the 'Memorial Initiative' to commemorate Diaspora Jews who are not citizens of Israel and who lost their lives in antisemitic attacks. This was done through the creation of the 'Ruderman Roadmap’ which laid out the outlines for promoting the initiative, in collaboration with the Ministry of the Diaspora Affairs and Combatting Antisemitism and the World Zionist Organization, and which was implemented by the Israeli government on May 7, 2023.

== Awards and recognition ==
- Ruderman was named by The Jerusalem Post as one of the 50 most influential Jews of the year in 2016, and again in 2022
- Honorary doctorate from University of Haifa, Israel (2015)
- Honorary doctorate from Brandeis University (2018)
- Jacob Rader Marcus Award from the American Jewish Archives (2019)

== See also ==
- Women of Israel
- List of philanthropists
- Women's empowerment
