= Max Miller (politician) =

American politician (born 1988)

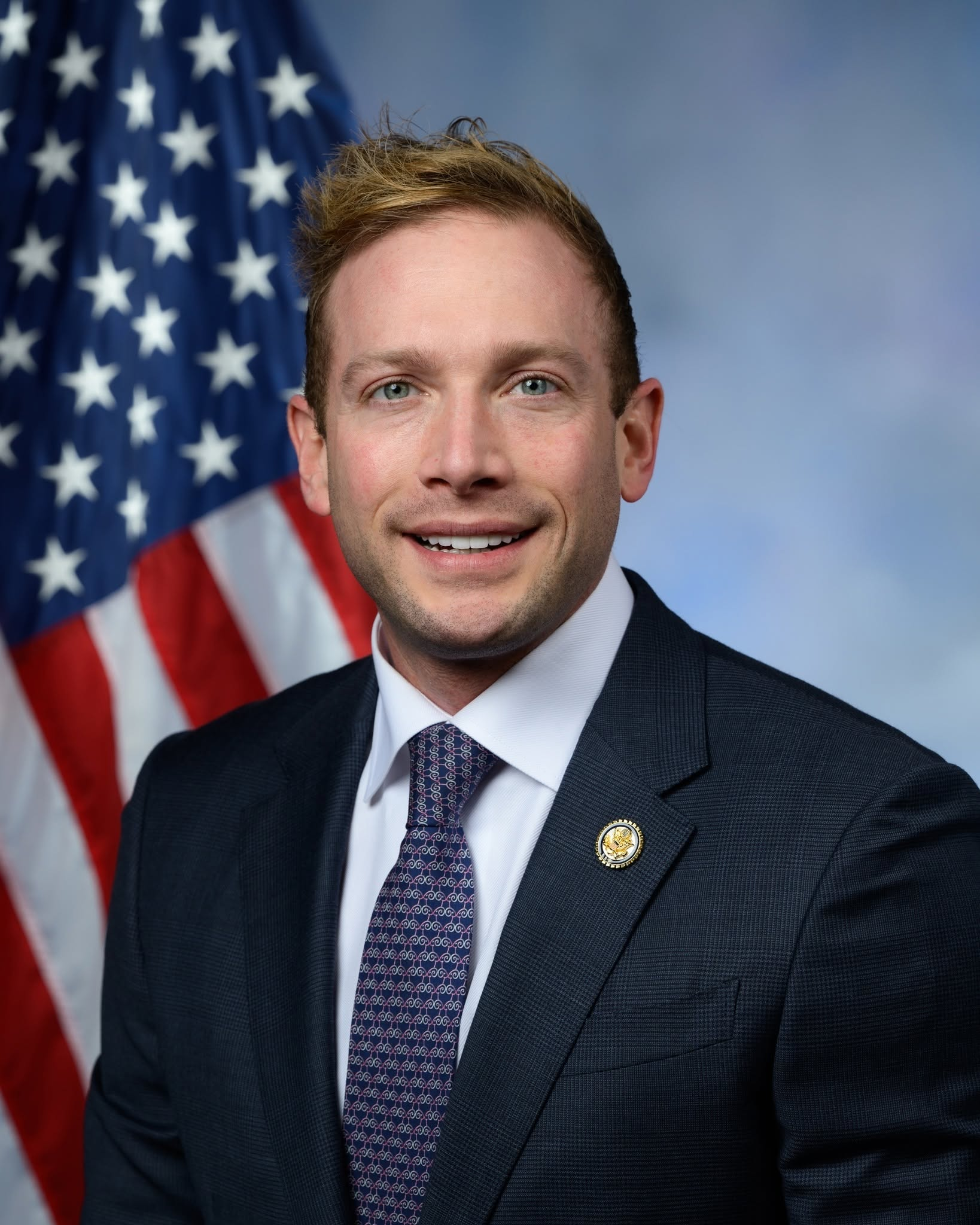
- Official portrait, 2025

Member of the U.S. House of Representatives from Ohio's 7th district
- Incumbent
- Assumed office January 3, 2023
- Preceded by: Bob Gibbs

Personal details
- Born: Max Leonard Miller; November 13, 1988 (age 38) Shaker Heights, Ohio, US
- Party: Republican
- Spouse: Emily Moreno (m. 2022; div. 2025)
- Children: 1
- Relatives: Sam Miller (grandfather); Aaron David Miller (uncle); Bernie Moreno (ex-father-in-law)
- Education: University of Arizona (attended); Cleveland State University (BA)
- Website: House website Campaign website

Military service
- Allegiance: United States
- Branch/service: United States Marine Corps
- Years of service: 2013–2019
- Rank: Corporal
- Unit: United States Marine Corps Reserve
- Miller's voice Miller honoring the Wayne County Fair; Recorded September 2, 2026

Max Leonard Miller (born November 13, 1988) is an American politician who is the U.S. representative for Ohio's 7th congressional district. A member of the Republican Party, he previously served as a political appointee in the first Donald Trump administration.

In 2026, Miller's re-election campaign was embroiled in controversy after his ex-wife, Emily Moreno, accused him of domestic violence and of abusing their daughter. Senator Bernie Moreno, Miller's ex-father-in-law and ally, called on him to resign. This was followed by calls for Miller's resignation from GOP senators Jon Husted, Roger Marshall, Katie Britt and Tim Sheehy.

Miller lost his re-election bid in November 2026, losing to Democratic nominee Brian Poindexter.

== Early life, education, and career ==
Miller is the grandson of Samuel H. Miller, the former co-chair of Forest City Realty Trust, and son of Abe and Barb Miller. His grandmother, Ruth Miller, was a candidate for Ohio's 22nd congressional district in 1980. His uncle is Aaron David Miller, a scholar of Middle East studies. His cousin, Eli Miller, a senior member of Trump's 2016 presidential campaign, was later appointed chief of staff of the United States Department of the Treasury. He is Jewish.

Miller grew up in Northeast Ohio and graduated from Shaker Heights High School in 2007, where classmates described him as "a loose cannon" with a "huge temper" who was "not a nice person". At a party in high school, Miller is alleged to have pushed a female classmate through a door and down a staircase after she rejected his attempts to touch her. He attended the University of Arizona from August 2007 until December 2009. In August 2010, he transferred to Cleveland State University, where he earned a bachelor's degree in history in 2013.

Miller worked at a Lululemon store in Ohio before joining the Marine Reserve in 2013. Miller was a corporal and made no deployments. In 2019, he was transferred from the Selected Marine Corps Reserve to the Individual Ready Reserve.

== First Trump administration ==
After working for Marco Rubio's campaign for the 2016 Republican presidential nomination, Miller joined Donald Trump's presidential campaign in February 2016.

Miller was introduced to members of Trump's 2016 campaign by his cousin Eli Miller, who was a senior finance official for the campaign. After working as a campaign aide, Miller became a political appointee in the Trump administration. He was a confidential assistant in the United States Department of the Treasury in 2017, then a lead advance representative in the White House Office, and then associate director of the Presidential Personnel Office and special assistant to the president.

In June 2020, Miller was among the aides who accompanied Trump on his photo op at St. John's Church; a month later, he was appointed "deputy campaign manager for presidential operations" on Trump's reelection campaign. He is a favorite of Trump, whom Miller has praised as "the greatest POTUS this country has ever had." He helped organize the 2020 Republican convention, and was a Trump negotiator for the presidential debates.

In 2018, Miller was one of several Trump administration officials scrutinized for their inexperience and lack of qualifications. Miller's LinkedIn page falsely claimed that he had been a Marine recruiter and that he graduated from college in 2011 rather than in 2013. After The Washington Post raised questions about his biography, Miller removed the claims and called them mistakes made by a relative, who he said made the LinkedIn page on his behalf. Miller was one of the Trump aides who planned the final logistics of the 2020 Republican National Convention after plans for a full-scale convention in Jacksonville were abandoned. Miller was appointed to the Holocaust Memorial Council by President Trump in December 2020.

In 2020 and 2021, Miller promoted Trump's false claim that the 2020 presidential election was "rigged". In June 2021, referring to the pro-Trump attack on the U.S. Capitol on January 6, 2021, Miller told The Washington Times, "What happened on January 6 was not an insurrection." In mid-December 2021, Miller was one of six people the January 6 committee subpoenaed to produce documents relating to the rally preceding the Capitol attack and deposed in January 2022. Miller testified that "what happened on that day is horrific," and insisted that he was being targeted for political reasons. The committee did not find him culpable of any wrongdoing.

== U.S. House of Representatives ==
=== Elections ===
==== 2022 ====
In February 2021, Miller launched a campaign for Congress in the redrawn 7th district. The district had previously been the 16th, represented by two-term Republican Anthony Gonzalez. Miller was initially set to face Gonzalez in the Republican primary, but Gonzalez announced in September 2021 that he would not seek reelection to a third term, denouncing Trump as a "cancer for the country" and citing the likelihood of a "brutally hard primary" against Miller, family considerations, and a wave of threats against him. Miller ran after Gonzalez voted to impeach Trump for incitement of insurrection, arising from the January 6 United States Capitol attack. Miller moved back to Ohio, purchasing a home in Rocky River, in order to challenge Gonzalez.

In June 2021, in his first rally since the January 6 attack, Trump appeared in Wellington, Ohio, with Miller; he praised Miller in a 90-minute rally in which he addressed many topics, including his falsehoods about the 2020 election. Miller won the May 3 Republican primary for Ohio's 7th congressional district with 71.8% of the vote. After announcing his candidacy, Miller was endorsed by Trump, Turning Point Action, the Madison Project, and the Club for Growth. He also received support from Ohio Right to Life, and Congressman Jim Banks. He defeated Democratic nominee Matthew Diemer in the November 8 general election with 55.4% of the vote.

==== 2024 ====
Miller ran for re-election in 2024. He won the Republican nomination unopposed, and defeated Democratic nominee Matthew Diemer and former congressman and political independent Dennis Kucinich at the general election.

==== 2026 ====
Miller ran for re-election in 2026. He won the Republican primary unopposed, and faced Democratic nominee Brian Poindexter at the general election, losing his seat. In August 2026, abuse allegations against Miller made by his ex-wife received national attention. Following the allegations, ex-father-in-law and Republican U.S. Senator Bernie Moreno called on him to resign amid abuse allegations but Miller has vowed to continue running. President Donald Trump also called Miller to express doubts about his candidacy. The New York Times and Politico described the allegations as damaging to Miller's electoral chances and turned a seat previously viewed by analysts as safe into a competitive race. On August 7, Miller announced that he would loan his campaign $1 million, rejecting calls to withdraw, and he allowed a withdrawal deadline to pass the following day. This closed the last practical opportunity for Ohio Republicans to replace him on the November ballot, as state law did not permit party officials to substitute a candidate without his cooperation; a campaign spokesperson said he would remain in the race.

Miller lost the November general election to his Democratic opponent, Brian Poindexter.

=== Tenure ===
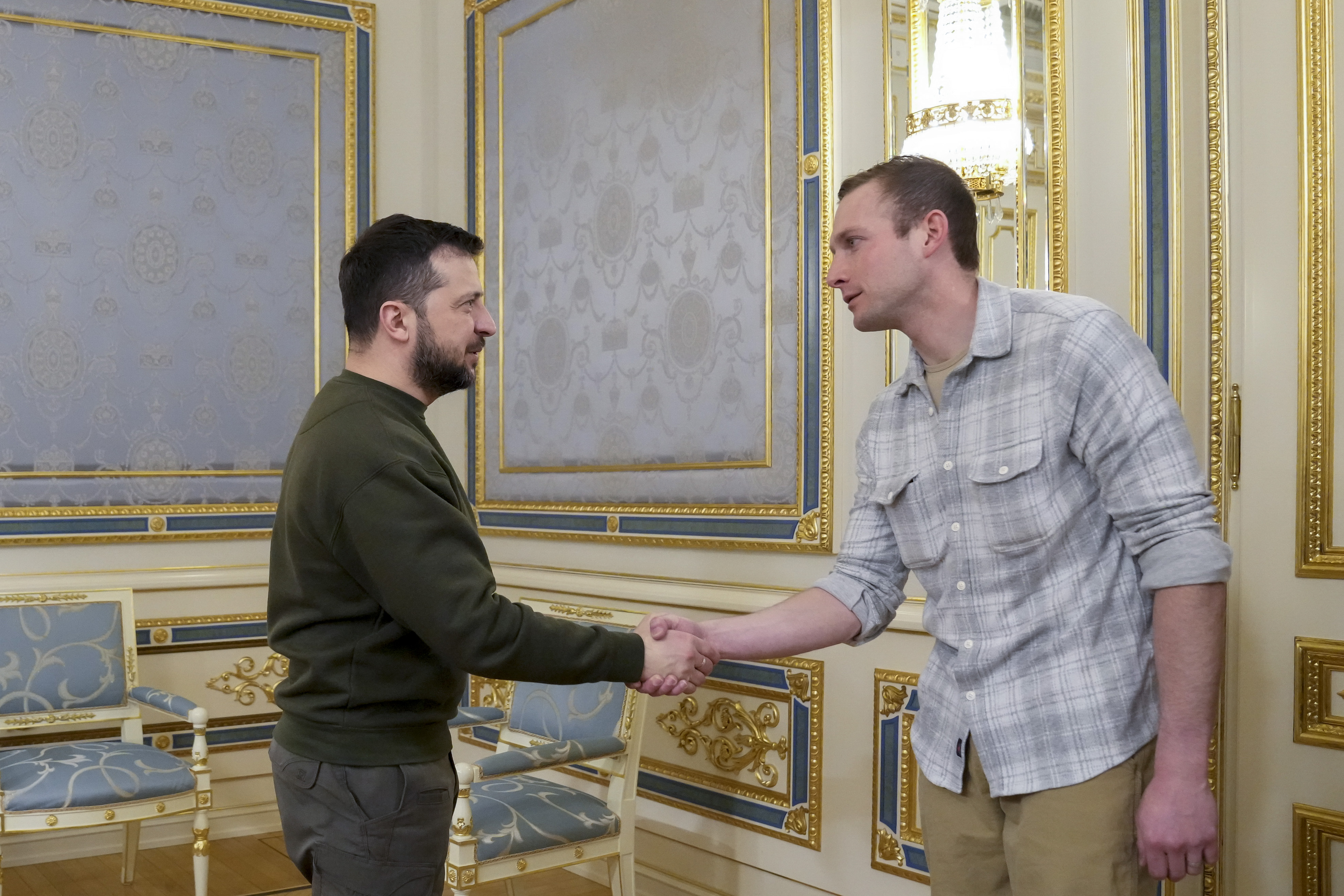
Miller with Ukrainian president Volodymyr Zelenskyy in Kyiv, Ukraine, February 21, 2023

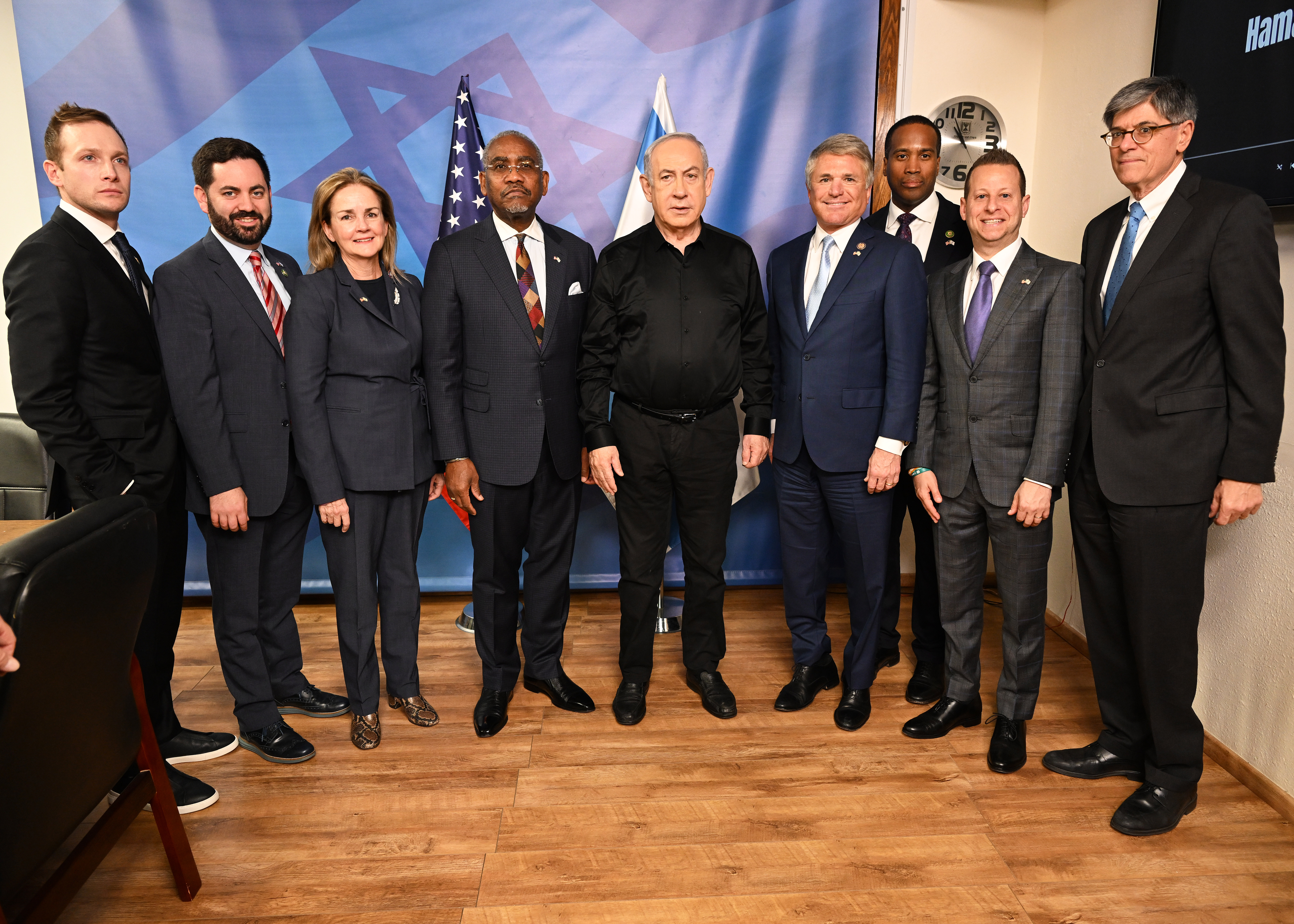
Miller (left) with Israeli prime minister Benjamin Netanyahu (center) in Israel, November 12, 2023

Miller was elected by other incoming Republicans to represent them on the steering committee, which determines what committees members sit on. On January 31, 2023, Miller introduced a resolution to remove Minnesota representative Ilhan Omar from the Foreign Affairs Committee. The resolution passed two days later.

On November 30, 2023, Miller sent a letter to his congressional colleagues supporting the expulsion of George Santos, alleging that Santos defrauded him and his mother by making charges to their personal credit cards without approval "for [campaign] contribution amounts that exceeded FEC limits." Miller said that this situation had cost him "tens of thousands of dollars" in legal fees. Miller brought these accusations directly to Santos in House session, calling him a "crook"; in response Santos accused Miller of hypocrisy and domestic violence. Santos was expelled from Congress in December 2023 and would plead guilty in August 2024 to 23 felonies related to wire fraud, campaign fraud, and identity theft.

After the October 7, 2023, attack by Hamas in southern Israel, Miller criticized Rashida Tlaib for displaying a Palestinian flag outside her office, saying: "I don't even want to call it the Palestinian flag because they're not a state, they're a territory, that's about to probably get eviscerated and go away here shortly, as we're going to turn that into a parking lot." Miller further stated there should be no "rules of engagement" in the Israeli war in Gaza.

In January 2024, Miller was appointed to the Commission on Reform and Modernization of the Department of State. In May 2024, Miller co-sponsored H.R. 8445. The bill would extend core U.S. servicemember protections (such as guaranteed job reinstatement, anti-discrimination rights, and financial and legal relief like capped interest rates, foreclosure protections, and paused court proceedings) for Americans serving in the Israeli Defense Forces. The change would extend these protections to foreign military service, treating it the same as service in the U.S. armed forces and departing from the current rule that limits their application to those who have served in the U.S. military.

=== Committee assignments ===
For the 119th Congress:

- Committee on Foreign Affairs
  - Subcommittee on Africa
  - Subcommittee on Oversight and Intelligence
- Committee on Ways and Means
  - Subcommittee on Oversight
  - Subcommittee on Work and Welfare

=== Caucus memberships ===
- Republican Main Street Caucus
- Republican Study Committee
- Congressional Western Caucus

=== Commission appointments ===
- Commission on Reform and Modernization of the Department of State

== Personal life and controversies ==
=== Relationships ===
In 2019 and 2020, Miller dated Stephanie Grisham, who served as White House press secretary and White House communications director during the period.

In 2021, Miller became engaged to Emily Moreno, daughter of future Senator Bernie Moreno. They married in August 2022 at the Trump National Golf Club Bedminster in New Jersey. The couple had a daughter born in November 2023. In August 2024, on the couple's second wedding anniversary, Miller filed for divorce.

=== Abuse allegations ===
==== 2021 abuse allegations ====
In October 2021, Grisham released a memoir that revealed she was physically abused by a partner while working at the White House. She later identified Miller as the partner. Miller filed a defamation lawsuit against Grisham alleging the claims were made to fuel sales of Grisham's memoir. He voluntarily dismissed the case with prejudice in August 2023.

On August 4, 2026, Grisham filed for a temporary restraining order against Miller, citing repeated breaches of the settlement of their previous lawsuit.

==== 2026 abuse allegations ====
In 2026 court filings, Miller's former wife Emily Moreno alleged that he had physically abused her by scalding her with hot water, holding a gun to her head, pushing her against a wall and hitting her. Moreno also accused Miller of breaking their 2-year-old daughter's collarbone. Miller denied the accusations, alleging his wife was a liar, stalker, and dangerous individual who made their daughter unsafe, and said Moreno suffered from bipolar disorder, which she denied.

Miller said the abuse did not happen because Moreno made friendly overtures and cooked him dinner in the days following the alleged incidents, and that he retained joint custody of their child. Miller also said he had only playfully thrown water at Moreno and denied pointing a gun at her. A February 2026 investigation into accusations of child abuse did not result in charges being filed. Miller sued Moreno for defamation in May. In July, Moreno filed a restraining order against Miller.

On August 2, 2026, Senator Bernie Moreno made a statement on social media denouncing Miller for abusing his daughter and granddaughter, stating he was not fit to hold office.

On August 4, 2026, after Miller said on social media that he would file paperwork requesting an inquiry into himself "to clear my name", the United States House Committee on Ethics announced that it was reviewing allegations that he "may have engaged in domestic violence and abuse or illegal drug use" in violation of congressional conduct rules. The committee added that the fact of its investigating the allegations and publicly disclosing the review "does not itself indicate that any violation has occurred".

A lawyer for Emily Moreno accused Miller of posting child sexual abuse material images of his daughter online, referring to an incident in which Miller shared a link to a Dropbox folder on X that included multiple images of his wife and daughter, one of which allegedly included his daughter's genitals.

On November 16, 2026, an Ohio judge dismissed Miller's defamation lawsuit against Moreno, ruling that her allegation that he had scalded her with hot water was "substantially true." The judge cited an audio recording in which Miller acknowledged the incident. The court also found insufficient evidence that Moreno had acted with actual malice or leaked the allegations to the media. Miller was ordered to pay Moreno more than $76,000 in legal fees and court costs.

=== Legal and social issues ===
In 2007, Miller pleaded no contest to two misdemeanor charges after being charged with assault, disorderly conduct, and resisting arrest; the charges were later dismissed as part of a diversion program.

In 2009, he was charged with underage drinking; after he pleaded no contest, that charge was also dismissed under a first-time offenders' program.

In 2010, Miller pleaded guilty to disorderly conduct stemming from a late-night physical altercation in Cleveland Heights, Ohio. In 2011, he was charged with "operating a vehicle without reasonable control" and operating a vehicle impaired (OVI) after crashing his Jeep Grand Cherokee, and told officers that he had had "two to three beers and several shots" the night before and "woke up in urine-soaked pants". Miller pleaded guilty to a misdemeanor and failure to control. In 2018 and 2021, he called the events "youthful mistakes". Miller has had alcohol dependency and anger issues since early adolescence.

In 2023, Miller criticized a tweet by Elizabeth Marbach, the communications director of Ohio Right to Life, which stated there is "no hope for any of us outside of having faith in Jesus Christ alone;" Miller described the tweet as "bigoted" and urged Marbach to delete it. Miller, who is Jewish, was accused of anti-Christian sentiment by several conservatives including Matt Walsh. Marbach was fired shortly thereafter; Miller's then-wife, Emily Moreno, was on the board of directors of the organization, which led to some suggesting she may have had a role in Marbach's firing, although the organization and Marbach herself denied it. Marbach claimed her release was due to internal disagreement over abortion messaging rather than Miller's tweet. After being fired, Marbach was defended by Minnesota Democratic congresswoman Ilhan Omar. Miller later publicly apologized for his remarks.

In June 2025, Miller reported being the target of an antisemitic threat and road rage incident while driving to work. In a 911 call, Miller claimed that a man in another vehicle displayed a Palestinian flag, threatened to kill him and his daughter, and hurled antisemitic slurs at him. Miller, a self-described "defender of Israel", filed a complaint with police, and a 36-year-old suspect, Feras Hamdan, was arrested and charged with aggravated menacing. The U.S. Capitol Police and local law enforcement investigated the incident, which congressional leaders condemned as an example of rising political violence. In court, highway surveillance footage and data independently retrieved from Hamdan's Tesla cast doubt on parts of Miller's accusations. Hamdan later accepted a plea deal reducing the charges to misdemeanors; the menacing charge was dismissed. He subsequently sued Miller for defamation and other civil claims.

== See also ==
- List of Jewish members of the United States Congress

U.S. House of Representatives
Preceded by Bob Gibbs	Member of the U.S. House of Representatives from Ohio's 7th congressional district 2023–present	Incumbent
U.S. order of precedence (ceremonial)
Preceded by Rob Menendez	United States representatives by seniority 336th	Succeeded by Cory Mills
