= Michael Levin (soldier) =

American-Israeli soldier (1984–2006)

Michael Levin (Hebrew: מיכאל לוין; February 17, 1984, Holland, Pennsylvania, United States – August 1, 2006, Ayta ash Shab, Lebanon) was an American-Israeli soldier in the Paratroopers Brigade of the Israel Defense Forces (IDF) who was killed in action in the Second Lebanon War.

Levin's death had a major impact in Israel. Thousands of people attended his funeral, and his death inspired the creation of the Lone Soldier Center, a support organization for other lone soldiers in the IDF. A memorial to him was built in Jerusalem.

== Early life ==
Levin grew up in Holland in Bucks County, Pennsylvania, the grandson of two Holocaust survivors. In the summers, he attended Camp Ramah, a Jewish summer camp. Inspired by the stories of his grandparents, Levin made aliyah and moved to Israel in 2002 at the age of 18. He spent a year in an ulpan studying Hebrew and volunteering on Kibbutz Tirat Zvi, before joining the Israel Defense Forces (IDF).

As a foreign-born soldier without immediate family in Israel, Levin was considered a lone soldier in the IDF. When Levin enlisted, there were an estimated 2,300 lone soldiers, approximately 120 of whom were American.

== IDF service ==
Levin had completed 2 years in the IDF when the Second Lebanon War broke out between Israel and Lebanon in July 2006. Levin was in Battalion 890 of the IDF's Paratroopers Brigade. When the war erupted, Levin ended his home leave in Pennsylvania and rejoined his unit stationed on Israel's northern border with Lebanon.

Omer Yaniv, from Levin's paratrooper unit, gave a graphic description of the chaotic circumstances surrounding his death. The 890th Paratrooper Battalion came under heavy fire as they advanced into the town. The IDF soldiers could not identify the source of the fire. The battalion's units got separated when running for cover. Levin's platoon hid in the back room of an empty store. A Hezbollah fighter managed to get close and fire straight into the small room, hitting Levin in the head. After several hours reinforcements reached the building and extracted them.

=== Death ===
Levin was one of three IDF soldiers killed in Ayta ash Shab that day. Another 27 on the Israeli side were wounded. For several hours the Israeli soldiers fought and killed 15 Hezbollah fighters, according to IDF figures. The IDF's wounded were treated at the spot under heavy fire, as an evacuation was deemed almost impossible. A local commander of Hezbollah guided Al Jazeera through Ayta ash Shab after the war and showed them the store where Levin was killed.

Levin was the first American and 36th IDF soldier killed during the Second Lebanon War. Of the 41 IDF soldiers killed during the war, three were lone soldiers.

== Funeral and legacy ==
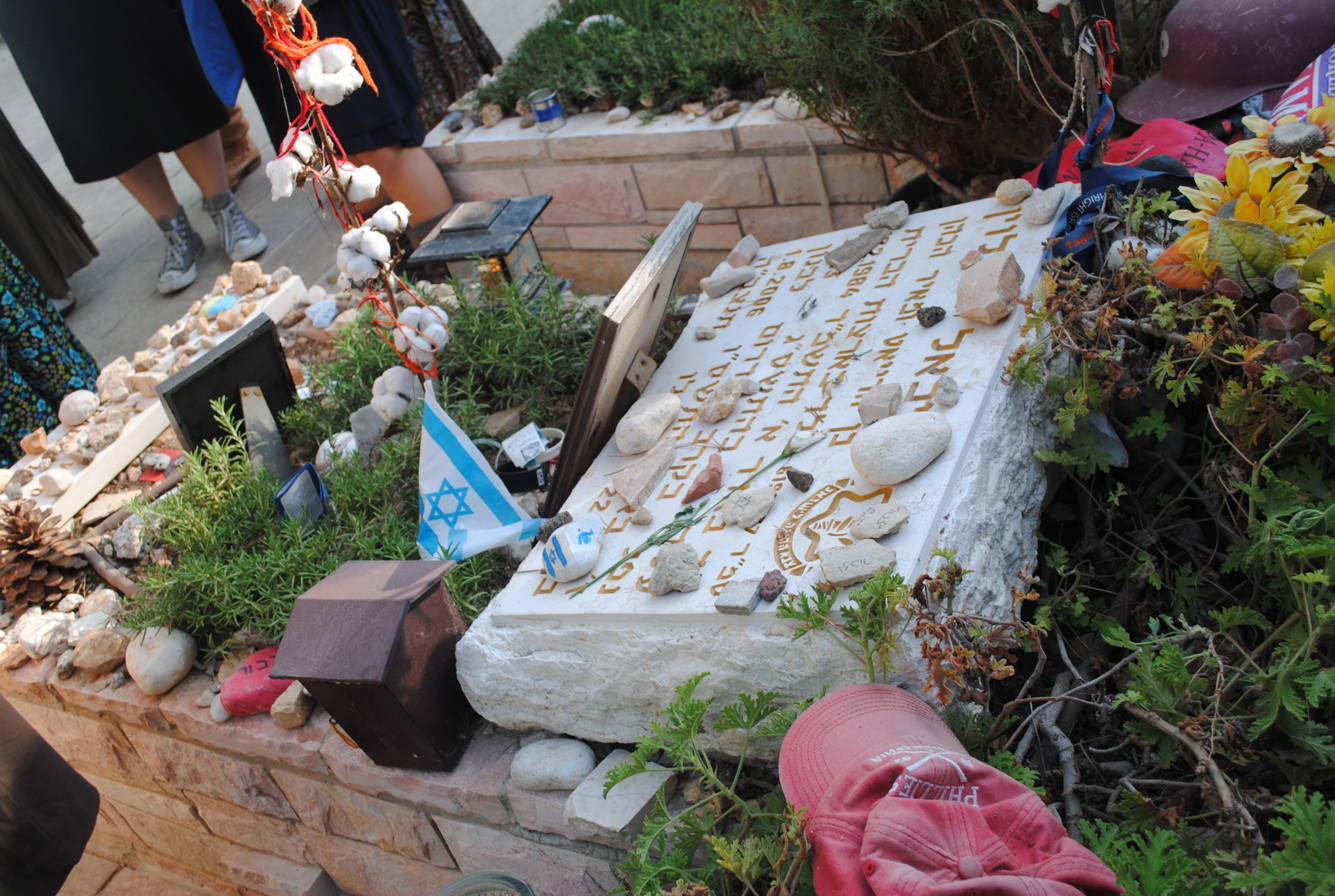
Michael Levin's grave at Mount Herzl

Levin was buried on August 3 at Mt. Herzl, Israel's national cemetery. Levin's death was credited with increasing interest from lone soldiers in serving in the IDF and improving the resources to support them. By 2014, there were more than 5,700 lone soldiers in the IDF. In addition, there were four Lone Soldier Centers set up in Levin's honor to provide housing, meals, and cultural acclimation support to lone soldiers.

A memorial for Levin was erected at Ammunition Hill, Jerusalem, the site of a major battle during the Six-Day War of 1967. The Lone Soldier Center in Memory of Michael Levin was created in 2009 by a group of people who had served as "lone soldiers" in the IDF. The center operates from branches in Jerusalem, Tel Aviv, and Haifa. It provides services to lone soldiers such as help finding housing, counseling, and organized meals on Jewish holidays and the Jewish Sabbath.

In 2020, the Michael Levin Base was established in Jerusalem by volunteers and professionals from within the lone soldier community. Backed by the Michael Levin Lone Soldier Foundation, the charitable entity founded by Levin's parents Mark and Harriet, the Base supports lone soldiers and lone b'not sherut (national service volunteers), a population not previously served by other organizations bearing his name. The Base moved to a larger facility near the Mahane Yehuda Market in 2023 and received the Jerusalem Mayor's Volunteer Award in 2025.

On August 1, 2011, the 5th anniversary ("yarzheit") of Levin's death according to the Gregorian calendar, a flag was flown over the US Capitol in his memory at the request of a man from his local area, Johnson Reynolds, who considered him both an Israeli and American hero. Upon receiving the flag from the architect of the Capitol, Reynolds, at the invitation of an IDF battalion commander, traveled with several friends to Israel and on September 21, 2011, accompanied by a member of the IDF, flew that flag over Levin's resting place at Mt. Herzl. On June 27, 2012 they presented the flag to Levin's parents, Mark and Harriet Levin, in a case with the assistance of Consul General Daniel Kutner of the Israeli consulate of Philadelphia.

== See also ==
- Max Steinberg, lone soldier killed during the 2014 Gaza War
