= Ruderman Family Foundation =

American private philanthropic foundation

- Founded: 2002; 24 years ago
- Type: International non-governmental organization
- Region served: Worldwide
- President: Jay Ruderman
- Website: rudermanfoundation.org

The Ruderman Family Foundation is a private philanthropic foundation established in Boston, Massachusetts, United States, managed by the Ruderman family. The foundation operates in the US and in Israel in two main areas: inclusion of people with disabilities in society and strengthening the relationship between Israel and the American Jewish community with the help of strategic philanthropy.

== History ==
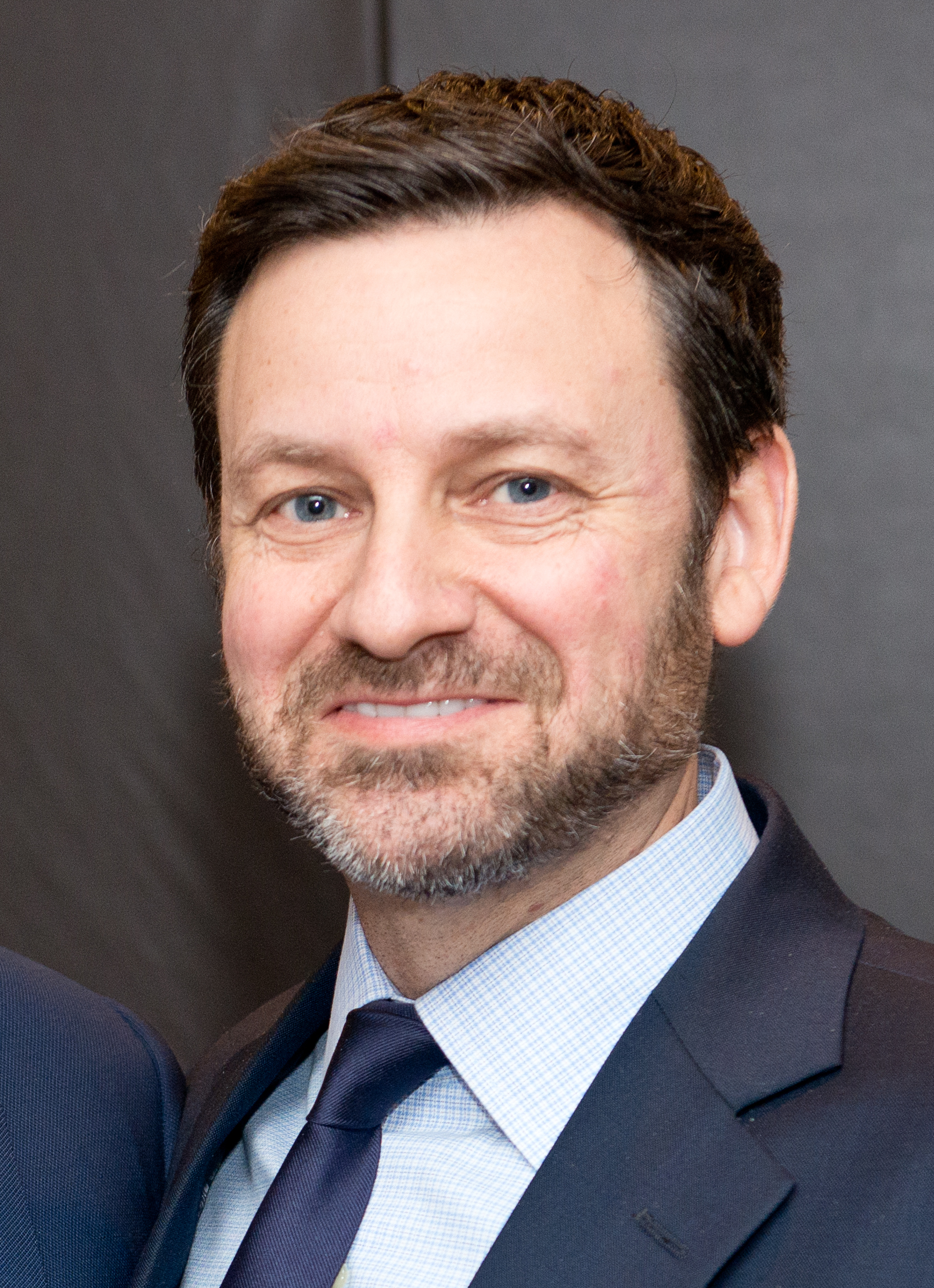
Jay Ruderman, founder

The Ruderman Family Foundation was established in 2002. Jay Ruderman is the president of the foundation, and his wife Shira is its executive director. In 2006, the foundation opened an office in Israel.

== White papers ==
In March 2016, the Ruderman Family Foundation released a white paper, "Media coverage of law enforcement use of force and disability". It is an overview of media coverage from 2013 to 2015 of law enforcement's use of force against disabled individuals. The study was authored by historian David Perry and disabilities expert and advocate Lawrence Carter-Long. It concluded that disabled individuals make up a third to a half of individuals killed by law enforcement officers and many use of force cases, such as the deaths of Eric Garner, Kajieme Powell, and Freddie Gray. The authors wrote that "police have become the default responders to mental health calls" and yet they continue to use force to obtain compliance from suspects without first evaluating whether a suspect is capable of understanding and complying with verbal orders. They recommended new training for officers and requested that the media also report forms of disability discrimination when appropriate; "Disability is the missing word in media coverage of police misuse of force."

The foundation's July 2016 white paper "On Employment of Actors with Disabilities in Television" revealed that people with disabilities are the most unrepresented minority in Hollywood. Despite making up nearly 20% of the US population, 95% of disabled characters on TV are portrayed by able-bodied actors. The report, co-authored by actor Danny Woodburn and Kristina Kopić, the foundation's Advocacy Content Specialist, surveyed hundreds of actors with visible and non-visible disabilities. Most worked less than once a year and felt they were discriminated against by casting agents and producers.

Prior to the 2016 US presidential election, the foundation released its third white paper, on voting accessibility for people with disabilities. The Government Accountability Office reported that in 2008, 73% of polling places had some potential accessibility barrier, while a Rutgers and Syracuse study determined that if voters with disabilities voted at the same rate as voters with the same demographics, but without disabilities, three million more people would have voted in the 2012 US presidential election. Co-written by Norman Ornstein, a political scientist at the American Enterprise Institute, the analysis focused on: insufficient poll worker training; access barriers to polls (including publicly available transportation); access barriers to elections material and registration material prior to elections; stigma (including against developmental and psychiatric disabilities); and limitations on resources available to election officials. The study was featured on Fox News and covered by The Guardian and Mic.

In January 2017, a fourth white paper was released about the benefits of self-driving cars for people with disabilities. Written with Securing America's Future Energy (SAFE), the report concluded that autonomous vehicles could enable new employment opportunities for approximately two million people with disabilities, save $19 billion annually in healthcare expenditures, and provide $1.3 trillion in savings from productivity gains, fuel costs and accident prevention. Furthermore, the report emphasized the societal benefit for people with disabilities by allowing more individuals to fulfill civic responsibilities and exercise civil rights, as well as the impact people with disabilities can have in the legislative and regulatory discussions surrounding emerging transportation technologies. The piece was featured in a number of outlets including Metro, Boston Herald, Autotrader and Curbed.

A white paper released in August 2017 stated that people with non-apparent disabilities do not always receive the accommodations guaranteed to them under the Americans with Disabilities Act. Students with non-apparent disabilities were said to be suspended and criminalized at a disproportionately high rates, while over half of the incarcerated population of the United States suffered from mental illness. Another 19-31% had cognitive or learning disabilities.

In September 2017, the Foundation launched the Ruderman TV Challenge, a call-to-action follow up to the Ruderman White Paper on the Employment of Actors with Disabilities in Television. It was found that only 2% of all television characters compared to the 20% of the US population is disabled, and that 95% of top TV show characters with disabilities are played by non-disabled performers. The challenge called for the creators of scripted television pilots to audition and cast more performers with disabilities.

In April 2017, the Ruderman White Paper "Mental Health and Suicide of First Responders" examined mental health issues among first responders and their elevated rate of suicide. One study found that on average, police officers witness 188 critical incidents during their careers which can lead to mental illness. The paper lays out barriers that prevent first responders from accessing mental health services when coping with trauma.

Released in December 2018, this paper investigates the practice of imposing leaves of absence on students experiencing mental illness. The study grades the leave of absence policies of eight universities, none of which received higher than a D+. The paper also covered ethnographic aspects of the problem.

== Disability inclusion ==
On November 1, 2016, the foundation hosted a disability inclusion round table to address the underrepresentation of people with disabilities in film and TV. Panelists and participants included Marlee Matlin, RJ Mitte, Danny Woodburn, Micah Fowler, Orlando Jones, Jason Winston George, Robert David Hall, Scott Silveri, and Glen Mazzara.

The Ruderman Family Foundation created a pledge for the entertainment industry, to encourage studios to increase their auditions of actors with disabilities for their productions. The pledge reads:

We recognize that disability is central to diversity, that the disability community comprises one of the largest minority groups in our country, and that people with disabilities face exclusion in front of and behind the camera. We understand that increasing auditions, no matter the size of the role, is a critical step towards achieving inclusion in the industry. We will continue to champion and encourage more auditions for actors and actresses with disabilities on television and film.

As of September 2021, the following studios have signed the pledge: NBCUniversal, CBS Entertainment Group, Paramount Pictures, and Sony Pictures.

== Ruderman Prize in Inclusion ==
In 2012, the Ruderman Family Foundation launched the annual Ruderman Prize In Inclusion, which awards $50,000 to each of five companies and organizations around the world that operate innovative programs and provide services that foster the full inclusion of people with disabilities.

== Morton E. Ruderman Award in Inclusion ==
The foundation has awarded the M.E.R. Award in Inclusion annually since 2014 to an individual who demonstrates outstanding accomplishment in the field of disability inclusion.

Morton E. Ruderman Award in Inclusion
Year	Recipient	Description	Ref
2017	Marlee Matlin	Oscar-winning actress and activist	
2018	Michael Phelps	Olympic swimmer	
2019	Farrelly brothers	Filmmakers	
2020	Taraji P. Henson	Actress	
2021	Kevin Love	Basketball Player	
2022	Selena Gomez	Actress and singer	
2023	Eva Longoria	Actress and Producer	
2024	Andrea Bocelli	Musician	
2025	Kenneth Cole	Designer	

== Israel's relationship with the American Jewish Community ==
The foundation has worked to strengthen the relationship between Israel and the American Jewish community since 2011, when it first took a delegation of Israeli legislators to the United States for an educational tour of the Jewish community. As of 2013, the foundation also takes Israeli journalists on similar tours. In 2012 the foundation helped establish the Israel-US Knesset caucus. In 2013 the foundation partnered with the University of Haifa, opening the Ruderman Program for American Jewish studies, the first academic program of its kind in Israel. In 2019 the foundation published a report with the Institute for National Security Studies about the ramifications of the relationship on Israel's national security. During 2020 the foundation and Israeli President Reuven Rivlin hosted a special event highlighting the importance of the relationship.

== Controversies ==
In response to the release of the 2016 film Me Before You, the Foundation condemned the film's portrayal of disability, in which the protagonist—who is paralyzed—ends up committing suicide because he feels his life is not worth living: "To the millions of people with significant disabilities currently leading fulfilling, rich lives, [the film] posits that they are better off committing suicide."

In the wake of pressure from Poland, the Foundation removed a video from YouTube posted on February 21, 2018, that was part of a campaign urging the United States to suspend its ties with Poland over the law that criminalizes blaming the Polish nation or state for German Nazi crimes. The video was condemned by Jewish communities in Poland for using the phrase "Polish Holocaust," which was deemed false and hurtful, as well as by the Israeli embassy in Poland.
