= Sam Miller (businessman) =

American businessman and philanthropist (1921–2019)

- Born: Samuel Henry Miller; June 26, 1921; Cleveland, Ohio, U.S.
- Died: March 7, 2019 (aged 97); Beachwood, Ohio, U.S.
- Burial place: Bet Olam Cemetery, Beachwood, Ohio, U.S.
- Education: Western Reserve University (BA); Harvard University (MBA)
- Occupations: Businessman; philanthropist
- Years active: 1947–2019
- Spouses: Ruth Ratner (m. 1946; div. 1982) Maria Shanley (m. 1983)
- Children: 4, including Aaron
- Military career
- Allegiance: United States
- Branch: United States Navy
- Service years: 1942–1946
- Rank: Lieutenant
- Conflicts: World War II; Pacific theater; Guadalcanal Campaign; Naval Battle of Guadalcanal

Samuel Henry Miller (June 26, 1921 – March 7, 2019) was an American businessman and philanthropist who propelled the growth of Forest City Material Co. (later Forest City Enterprises) from lumber to real-estate. He was the first Jewish person to receive an Archbishop Edward F. Hoban Award for service to the Catholic Church.

== Early life and education ==
Miller's father emigrated from Russia to Ellis Island, and then became a junk peddler in Cleveland, Ohio. His son would ride along with him in a horse-drawn carriage as he conducted his business. Miller earned a Bachelor of Arts degree from Western Reserve University in 1941 and a Master of Business Administration from Harvard Business School in 1943. Miller served in World War II as a lieutenant.

== Awards and philanthropy ==
Miller received a Lifetime Achievement Award from the Cleveland Catholic Diocese in 2015. He was presented the Lifetime Achievement Award at the Cleveland Jewish News on November 20, 2016 at Landerhaven. Miller served on the boards of Baldwin Wallace University, John Carroll University, Cleveland State University, Notre Dame College, Case Western Reserve University, Harvard Business School, WVIZ, Ideastream, American Red Cross, Urban League, United Jewish Appeal, and Jewish National Fund. In 2013, he was inducted into the Cleveland International Hall of Fame.

== Personal life and death ==
After serving in World War II, Miller met his future wife, Ruth Ratner (December 1, 1925 – November 26, 1996), in Wickliffe, Ohio, in 1946 at Leonard Ratner's summer cottage. Ruth was the daughter of Forest City Material Co. co-founder Leonard Ratner and sister of Albert Ratner; they married later that same year. Together, they had four children: Aaron David Miller, Richard Miller, Gabrielle Miller, and Abraham Miller. Miller divorced Ratner in 1983 and she remarried Rabbi Phillip Horowitz (1922 – 2002). He married Maria Shanley in 1983. Shanley converted from Roman Catholicism to Judaism upon marrying Miller. In 1996, his first wife, Ruth, died from cancer. Miller had surgery in 2002 to treat bladder cancer.

He died on March 7, 2019. Services were held at the Park Synagogue in Cleveland Heights, Ohio and his interment was at Bet Olam Cemetery.

== See also ==
- Jews and Judaism in Greater Cleveland
