= Guy Reschenthaler =

American politician and attorney (born 1983)

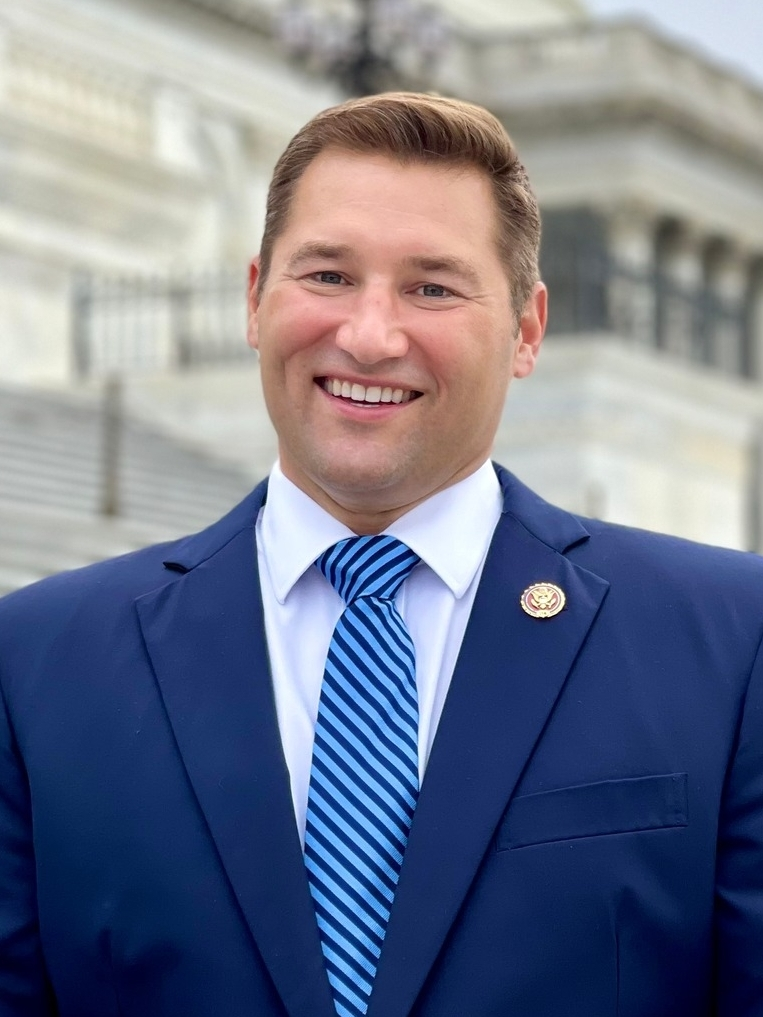
- Official portrait, 2022

House Republican Chief Deputy Whip
- Incumbent
- Assumed office January 3, 2023
- Leader: Kevin McCarthy; Mike Johnson
- Preceded by: Drew Ferguson

Member of the U.S. House of Representatives from Pennsylvania's 14th district
- Incumbent
- Assumed office January 3, 2019
- Preceded by: Conor Lamb (redistricted)

Member of the Pennsylvania Senate from the 37th district
- In office November 24, 2015 – January 3, 2019
- Preceded by: Matthew H. Smith
- Succeeded by: Pam Iovino

Personal details
- Born: Guy Lorin Reschenthaler; April 17, 1983 (age 43) Pittsburgh, Pennsylvania, U.S.
- Party: Republican
- Education: Pennsylvania State University, Behrend (BA); Duquesne University (JD)
- Website: House website Campaign website

Military service
- Allegiance: United States
- Branch/service: United States Navy
- Years of service: 2008–2012
- Rank: Lieutenant
- Unit: United States Navy Judge Advocate General's Corps; Naval Legal Service Office (Officer in Charge)
- Battles/wars: Iraq War

Guy Lorin Reschenthaler (/ˈrɛʃənˌθɑːlər/ RESH-ən-THAHL-ər; born April 17, 1983) is an American politician, attorney, judge, and U.S. Navy veteran. A Republican, he is serving as the U.S. representative for Pennsylvania's 14th congressional district since 2019 and was previously a member of the Pennsylvania State Senate, representing the 37th district. He served as a district judge, and in the U.S. Navy Judge Advocate General's Corps (JAG) during the Iraq War. He is serving as the Republican chief deputy whip in the 119th Congress.

== Early life and education ==
Reschenthaler was born in Pittsburgh on April 17, 1983. He was raised in Pittsburgh's South Hills and graduated from Thomas Jefferson High School in 2001. He graduated from Penn State Erie, The Behrend College in 2004 with a Bachelor of Arts degree in political science. Upon graduation, Reschenthaler attended Duquesne University School of Law in Pittsburgh, earning a Juris Doctor in 2007. At Duquesne, Reschenthaler founded the Military Law Society chapter and interned at the U.S. District Attorney's Office for the Western District of Pennsylvania in Pittsburgh.

== Military career ==
After law school, Reschenthaler was commissioned in the United States Navy Judge Advocate General's Corps (JAG). In the U.S. Navy, Reschenthaler deployed to Baghdad, Iraq, in 2009. In 2010, he was one of three attorneys who defended a Navy SEAL accused of covering up an assault on terrorist Ahmad Hashim Abd al-Isawi while al-Isawi was in custody. The Navy SEAL represented by Reschenthaler and the other SEALs charged were acquitted of all charges. Reschenthaler was awarded the Michael Taylor Shelby Award for Professionalism, Ethics and Dedication in the practice of law. He left military service in 2012.

== Legal career ==
After leaving the Navy, Reschenthaler returned to Pittsburgh to practice law in spring 2012 before being elected magisterial district judge in Pittsburgh's South Hills in 2013. In Pennsylvania, magisterial judges typically handle traffic tickets. He was elected district judge in May 2013. As a magistrate, Reschenthaler said that he would seek to reduce truancy.

In 2013, Reschenthaler briefly co-hosted a radio program with Carl Higbie. Reschenthaler had heated debates with Higbie on the show, with CNN reporting that, "In one episode in March 2013, after Higbie repeatedly argued that 'the black race' was 'lazier than the white race,' Reschenthaler became audibly upset at his co-host. The congressional candidate said that he was 'turning red' and 'feeling uncomfortable' listening to Higbie's rant, which he called 'insane' and 'so off-base.'"

Reschenthaler also wrote the foreword to a 2012 self-published book by Higbie. In April 2018, Reschenthaler denounced the book and disavowed the foreword he had written. He said he had only read parts of the book.

Reschenthaler was of counsel at Pittsburgh law firm Brennan, Robins & Daley and serves as a member of Penn State Behrend's Political Science Advisory Board.

== Pennsylvania Senate ==
After State Senator Matt Smith resigned, Reschenthaler won the Republican nomination for a special election in the 37th state Senate district in July 2015. He defeated the Democratic nominee, Heather Arnet, in the general election to serve the remainder of Smith's term, ending in 2016. He was sworn in on November 24, 2015.

== U.S. House of Representatives ==
=== Elections ===
==== 2018 special ====
In October 2017, Reschenthaler announced his candidacy for the Republican nomination in the special election in Pennsylvania's 18th congressional district. At the Republican Party conference, he lost to State Representative Rick Saccone. He received 75 votes from local activists and failed to gain a majority in the first round of voting. He was defeated by 32 votes in the second round.

==== 2018 general ====
After a court threw out Pennsylvania's congressional map as an unconstitutional partisan gerrymander, the 18th district was renumbered the 14th and made even more Republican on paper. Democrat Conor Lamb defeated Saccone in the special election for the old 18th, but had his home drawn into the neighboring 17th district (the former 12th district) and sought a full term there.

Reschenthaler ran in the Republican primary for the reconfigured 14th, again facing Saccone. This time, he won the nomination with 55.4% of the vote to Saccone's 44.6%. In the general election, he defeated the Democratic nominee, businesswoman Bibiana Boerio, with 58% of the vote.

==== 2020 general ====
Reschenthaler ran for reelection. He defeated the Democratic nominee, U.S. Marine Corps veteran William Marx, with 64.7% of the vote.

On December 31, 2020, Reschenthaler and seven other Republican U.S. representatives from Pennsylvania said they would oppose the certification of Pennsylvania's electors when Congress met to count electoral votes in the 2020 presidential election on January 6, 2021. The eight claimed that state officials had illegally allowed the counting of mail-in ballots that were received after Election Day but postmarked by November 3. According to NBC Philadelphia news and the Pennsylvania Capital-Star, this was not proven.

Reschentaler was also among those who signed an amicus brief to a lawsuit filed by Texas's attorney general (Texas v. Pennsylvania) seeking to throw out federal election results in key swing states, including Pennsylvania.

Reschenthaler, who represents the southwest corner of Pennsylvania, was one of 147 Republican representatives and senators to vote against certifying the presidential election results.

2024 general

In the 2024 general election, Reschenthaler defeated Democratic nominee Chris Dziados with 66.6% of the vote.

=== Tenure ===
In December 2020, Reschenthaler joined other Republicans in voting against providing $2,000 stimulus checks to Americans, on grounds that such aid would further weaken the US economy.

In April 2024, Reschenthaler co-sponsored a bill to rename Dulles International Airport after former president Donald Trump. He said in an interview that there would be "no better symbol of freedom, prosperity and strength".

In May 2024, Reschenthaler co-sponsored H.R. 8445, which proposes extending core U.S. servicemember protections—such as guaranteed job reinstatement, anti-discrimination rights, and financial and legal relief like capped interest rates, foreclosure protections, and paused court proceedings—for Americans serving in the Israeli Defense Forces. That would treat foreign military service like U.S. service for these protections, breaking from the current rule that they apply only to those serving in the U.S. armed forces.

=== Committee assignments ===
- Committee on Appropriations
  - Subcommittee on the Energy and Water Development
  - Subcommittee on State, Foreign Operations, and Related Programs
- Committee on Rules
  - Subcommittee on Rules and Organization of Congress
- Select Committee on the Modernization of Congress

=== Caucus memberships ===
- Congressional Caucus on Turkey and Turkish Americans
- Republican Study Committee
- Republican Main Street Partnership
- United States–China Working Group

== Personal life ==
Reschenthaler and his former wife, Jennifer, divorced in 2024. In 2025, he began dating Fox News reporter Brooke Singman. In February 2026, they were married in Manhattan, New York.

== Electoral history ==
2018 Reschenthaler: 55–60%

2020 Reschenthaler: 60–65% 65–70%

2018

2018 Pennsylvania's 14th congressional district Republican primary results
Party	Candidate	Votes	%
Republican	Guy Reschenthaler	23,245	55.4
Republican	Rick Saccone	18,734	44.6
Total votes		41,979	100.0

2018 Pennsylvania's 14th congressional district results
Party	Candidate	Votes	%
Republican	Guy Reschenthaler	151,386	57.9
Democratic	Bibiana Boerio	110,051	42.1
Total votes		261,437	100.0
Republican gain from Democratic			

2020

2020 Pennsylvania's 14th congressional district Republican primary results
Party	Candidate	Votes	%
Republican	Guy Reschenthaler (incumbent)	66,671	100.0
Total votes		66,671	100.0

2020 Pennsylvania's 14th congressional district election results
Party	Candidate	Votes	%
Republican	Guy Reschenthaler (incumbent)	241,688	64.7
Democratic	Bill Marx	131,895	35.3
Total votes		373,583	100.0
Republican hold			

2022

2022 Pennsylvania's 14th congressional district election results
Party	Candidate	Votes	%
Republican	Guy Reschenthaler (incumbent)	Unopposed	
Total votes		230,865	100.0
Republican hold			

2024

2024 Pennsylvania's 14th congressional district election results
Party	Candidate	Votes	%
Republican	Guy Reschenthaler (incumbent)	268,380	66.6
Democratic	Chris Dziados	134,755	33.4
Total votes		403,135	100.0
Republican hold			

U.S. House of Representatives
Preceded by Mike Doyle	Member of the U.S. House of Representatives; Pennsylvania's 14th congressional district 2019–present	Incumbent
Party political offices
Preceded by Drew Ferguson	House Republican Chief Deputy Whip; 2023–present	Incumbent
U.S. order of precedence (ceremonial)
Preceded by Ayanna Pressley	United States representatives by seniority 221st	Succeeded by John Rose
