= Media Watch International =

Organization

Media Watch International is a media monitoring organization founded by Sharon Tzur and based in New York City. It describes itself as "an independent, non-profit organization dedicated to advancing Israel's image by promoting accurate, impartial media coverage of, and providing timely, factual information about, Israel and the Middle East."

== Programs ==
=== HonestReporting ===
Sharon Tzur previously ran HonestReporting, a media monitoring organization based in the UK. Media Watch International was created with seed money from the Jerusalem Fund of Aish HaTorah to absorb HonestReporting. MWI's Honest Reporting program is described by the Jewish Agency for Israel as focusing on "guiding the reader into productive activism" and that it is "Pro-Israel" but "does not take a particular Israeli political position."

=== Democracy High School Edition ===
According to the Koret Foundation, which provides funding for MWI initiatives, Media Watch International in collaboration with Jewish National Fund and American Friends of Likud runs the "Caravan for Democracy High School Edition" (HSE), which "empowers high school juniors and seniors to advocate for Israel and respond to anti-Israel sentiments when they go off to college. The program has filled a void in Jewish education that previously left many students unprepared to support Israel when faced with opposing viewpoints or hostility."

== See also ==
- Public diplomacy of Israel
- Committee for Accuracy in Middle East Reporting in America

=== Similar organizations based in the United Kingdom ===
- Britain Israel Communications and Research Centre
- Engage
- Honest Reporting
