= HonestReporting =

Pro-Israel media monitoring organization

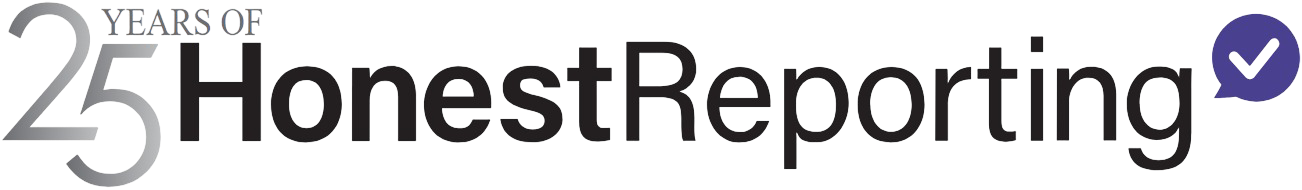
- Formation: October 2000; 26 years ago
- Founder: Shaul Rosenblatt
- Location: Israel
- Chief Executive Officer: Jacki Alexander
- Executive director: Gil Hoffman
- Website: honestreporting.com

HonestReporting or Honest Reporting is an Israeli media advocacy group. A pro-Israel media watchdog, it describes its mission as "combat[ting] ideological prejudice in journalism and the media, as it impacts Israel". It has been characterized as a pressure group that flags media coverage critical of Israel as inaccurate and targets journalists and media outlets.

== History ==
HonestReporting says its mission is "to combat ideological prejudice in journalism and the media, as it impacts Israel". It was founded in October 2000 by Shaul Rosenblatt, founder and head of Aish Hatorah-United Kingdom in response to controversy over the Tuvia Grossman photograph at the outbreak of the Second Intifada. The episode is often cited by those who accuse the media of having an anti-Israel bias, and was the impetus for the founding of HonestReporting.

Within six weeks, HonestReporting had an email list of 10,000 volunteers to monitor the media and respond accordingly. Irwin Katsof offered to lead fundraising efforts to hire professional staff.

In March 2006, a dedicated website by HonestReporting for covering the media in the UK was launched by two expatriate Britons, CEO Joe Hyams, and managing editor Simon Plosker; in 2011, the HR UK website was merged into the main site.

In February 2022, Gil Hoffman was appointed as the executive director of HonestReporting. Hoffman previously served as a reservist in the IDF Spokesperson's Unit. That September, Jacki Alexander was appointed global CEO of HonestReporting. Alexander previously worked as a regional director for the American Israel Public Affairs Committee (AIPAC), a pro-Israel lobby group.

=== HonestReporting Canada ===
HonestReporting Canada (HRC) was founded in 2003 to monitor Middle East news coverage in Canada. Journalist Jonathan Kay credited HRC with reducing perceived anti-Israel bias in the English-language media in Canada by 2011. In 2012, a campaign by HRC led to a Canadian Broadcast Standards Council investigation after local politician Stéphane Gendron made controversial comments on the French-language V Television Network.

In November 2024, HonestReporting Canada's assistant director, Robert Walker, was criminally charged with 17 counts of mischief for allegedly vandalizing several properties in a Toronto neighborhood by spray painting anti-Palestinian graffiti. The charges were withdrawn on March 5, 2025, in recognition of a $1,000 charitable donation by Walker to the Sick Kids Foundation.

== Finances ==
In 2024, HonestReporting reported roughly $3.4 million in revenue, according to its profile on ProPublica, marking the highest figure recorded since 2011.

In 2026, Drop Site News reported that HonestReporting had received a $100,000 "emergency grant" from the Knight Foundation in 2023.

== Activities ==
HonestReporting reviews news articles and op-eds regarding Israel to check for and respond to alleged bias or fake news.

HonestReporting has been characterized as a pressure group that flags media coverage critical of Israel as inaccurate and targets journalists and media outlets. The Columbia Journalism Review (CJR) has described HonestReporting as acting in bad faith, and noted it "made the absurd allegation that news organizations citing CPJ data were 'amplifying Hamas propaganda.'"

HonestReporting's actions have resulted in a number of corrections in the media. In 2022, Idris Muktar Ibrahim, a producer at CNN, was found to have made social media posts praising Hamas and saying "#TeamHitler." Following a report about him published by HonestReporting, CNN terminated their professional relationship with Muktar Ibrahim, who later apologized.

HonestReporting and its Canadian affiliate (HRC) have faced significant criticism from professional journalistic organizations and media outlets regarding their methods and impact on press freedom. The Canadian Association of Journalists, the Fédération professionnelle des journalistes du Québec, and Reporters Without Borders (RSF) have characterized the group's "Action Alerts" and online campaigns as a form of "digital warfare", "intimidation", and a "smear" against media professionals. Journalists from The Guardian, CTV News, and CBC News have reported being targeted by "global blitzes" of thousands of template-based emails that often employ a "violent" tone, accusing reporters of antisemitism or of "complicity in murder" to discredit their work.

=== Relationship with the Israeli government ===
HonestReporting states that it is not affiliated with any government or political party. In 2024, the organization participated in a high-level strategy session with Israeli Foreign Minister Gideon Sa'ar to coordinate a $150 million "public diplomacy" initiative described as "consciousness warfare" intended to influence global opinion. During these meetings, HonestReporting requested that the Israeli government provide specific data regarding Palestinian journalists killed in military actions.

HonestReporting has also collaborated with advocacy groups StandWithUs and Shurat HaDin, both of which have reportedly received guidance or support from Israeli officials within the National Security Council and the Mossad. Critics, including fact-checking website Misbar, have noted that many of HonestReporting's senior staff members are former employees of the IDF Spokesperson's Unit or the Israeli Prime Minister's Office, leading to accusations that the group functions as a hasbara arm of the Israeli government rather than a neutral monitor. Additionally, a 2001 investigation by The Guardian linked the group's early operations to Aish HaTorah, which was described at the time as a right-wing extremist organization.

=== Timeline ===
In 2012, HonestReporting filed a complaint with the Press Complaints Commission (PCC) in the UK after The Guardian ran a correction apologizing for having stated that Jerusalem was Israel's capital, contrary to the paper's style guide. HonestReporting acted to initiate a judicial review after the PCC initially ruled that The Guardian had not breached the PCC code, saying that the ruling had "potential to further delegitimize Jerusalem's status as Israel's capital." The PCC retracted its original ruling and asked the paper to defend its position. The Guardian then modified its style guide so that it no longer categorically states that Tel Aviv is the capital of Israel rather than Jerusalem.

During the 2012 Gaza War, HonestReporting accused BBC News of broadcasting footage of an injured Palestinian man who was later shown walking around, calling it a case of "Pallywood". A BBC spokesperson said in response, "The footage shown by BBC News was edited from a longer sequence provided by the Reuters news agency in which the man in question is shown being lifted from the ground. He is then given attention at the roadside, before appearing later having recovered. Steps have been taken to ensure any re-broadcast reflects the full sequence so that is absolutely clear to our audience." In 2015, HonestReporting published an article titled "On This Day: The Emergence of Al-Durrah and Pallywood", in which it cast doubt on the killing of Muhammad al-Durrah in 2000, during the Second Intifada.

In 2022, journalist Shatha Hammad was discovered to have posted on Facebook that she considered Adolf Hitler her "friend" and that they "share the same ideology, such as the extermination of the Jews." Hammad made other posts using the nickname "Hitler" and denying Israel's right to exist. She also termed terrorists who murdered Israeli worshipers in the 2014 Jerusalem synagogue attack as "martyrs." After HonestReporting's exposure of her posts, the Thomson Reuters Foundation and the Kurt Schork Memorial Fund withdrew the awards they had granted her.

In 2023, news producer Fady Hanona was discovered by HonestReporting to have posted antisemitic social media posts, leading news outlets he previously worked for such as The New York Times, The Guardian, and others to cut ties with him.

In November 2023, HonestReporting published an article questioning whether Palestinian photojournalists had tipped off the Associated Press, Reuters, The New York Times and CNN prior to the October 7 attacks. The report led two Israeli politicians to threaten that these journalists be killed, while the Israeli Prime Minister's office said the journalists were "accomplices in crimes against humanity". The media organizations strongly refuted allegations that they had any prior knowledge of the Hamas attack. Yousef Masoud, whose photos were published in the NYT and AP, started photographing 90 minutes after the attack started. Reuters said that its pictures, taken by two freelance photojournalists, were taken two hours after the attack began. The AP and CNN announced that they would stop working with one of the freelance photographers after HonestReporting showed a picture of him being kissed by Hamas leader Yahya Sinwar.

On November 10, 2023, HonestReporting's director said he accepted that the media groups had no advance knowledge of the October 7 Hamas attacks on Israel. He explained that as "not a news organization" the team did not seek verification of their claims. The organization's reliability has been questioned following the November 2023 report. RSF noted that these accusations were made "without any credible evidence." Major media outlets including The New York Times, Associated Press, and Reuters refuted these claims using metadata to prove photography began well after the attacks started.

The New York Times expressed "grave concern" that such allegations endanger freelancers in conflict zones. The fact-checking site Misbar alleged that several Palestinian journalists were targeted by the military or had their homes bombed shortly after being identified by HonestReporting.

== See also ==
- Committee for Accuracy in Middle East Reporting in America
- Fairness and Accuracy in Reporting
- Jewish Internet Defense Force
- Media bias
- Media coverage of the Arab–Israeli conflict
- Media Watch International
