= Gil Hoffman =

Israeli-American journalist

Gil Hoffman (Hebrew: גיל הופמן) is an Israeli-American journalist and political correspondent who was the executive director of HonestReporting. He was previously chief political correspondent for the Jerusalem Post.

== Early life ==
Hoffman grew up outside of Chicago in Lincolnwood, Illinois. He attended high school at Ida Crown Jewish Academy and graduated magna cum laude from Northwestern University's Medill School of Journalism. He previously worked for the Miami Herald and the Arizona Republic. He made Aliyah at age 22 in 1999. After immigrating to Israel, Hoffman served in an artillery unit with the Israel Defense Forces (IDF) and later served as a spokesperson for the IDF reserves.

== Career ==
Hoffman became executive director of HonestReporting in June 2022. He worked for the Jerusalem Post from 1998 - 2022 and served as their long-time chief political correspondent where he interviewed prime ministers, generals, government ministers and other prominent politicians and covered 10 Knesset elections. Hoffman has noted in the past it is important to him to remain objective in speaking about Israel due to his position as chief political correspondent.

Hoffman hosted the podcast Inside Israel Today on The Land of Israel Network from 2017 - 2020. He hosted a podcast on Voice of Israel from 2014 - 2015.

In the past he has appeared on major media outlets such as CNN, TRT World, and Al Jazeera along with local Israeli television programs. He is a frequent lecturer on Israel, having spoken in every major English-speaking country in the world. He is the first Israeli speaker to have lectured in all 50 U.S. states. Hoffman taught a course in journalism at the College of Management Academic Studies.

In 2022 Hoffman was named one of the top 100 people positively influencing Jewish life. In 2025 he was recognized by the Knesset at the Voices of Iron ceremony for his advocacy work.

In 2026 Hoffman's first book was published titled The Blood Libel Machine: Exposing the Anti-Israel Hate Network, and How to Fight Back. The forward was written by Israeli actress Noa Tisby.

== Personal life ==
Hoffman was born in the United States and currently resides in Jerusalem with his family.
