= Jay Ruderman =

American lawyer and philanthropist

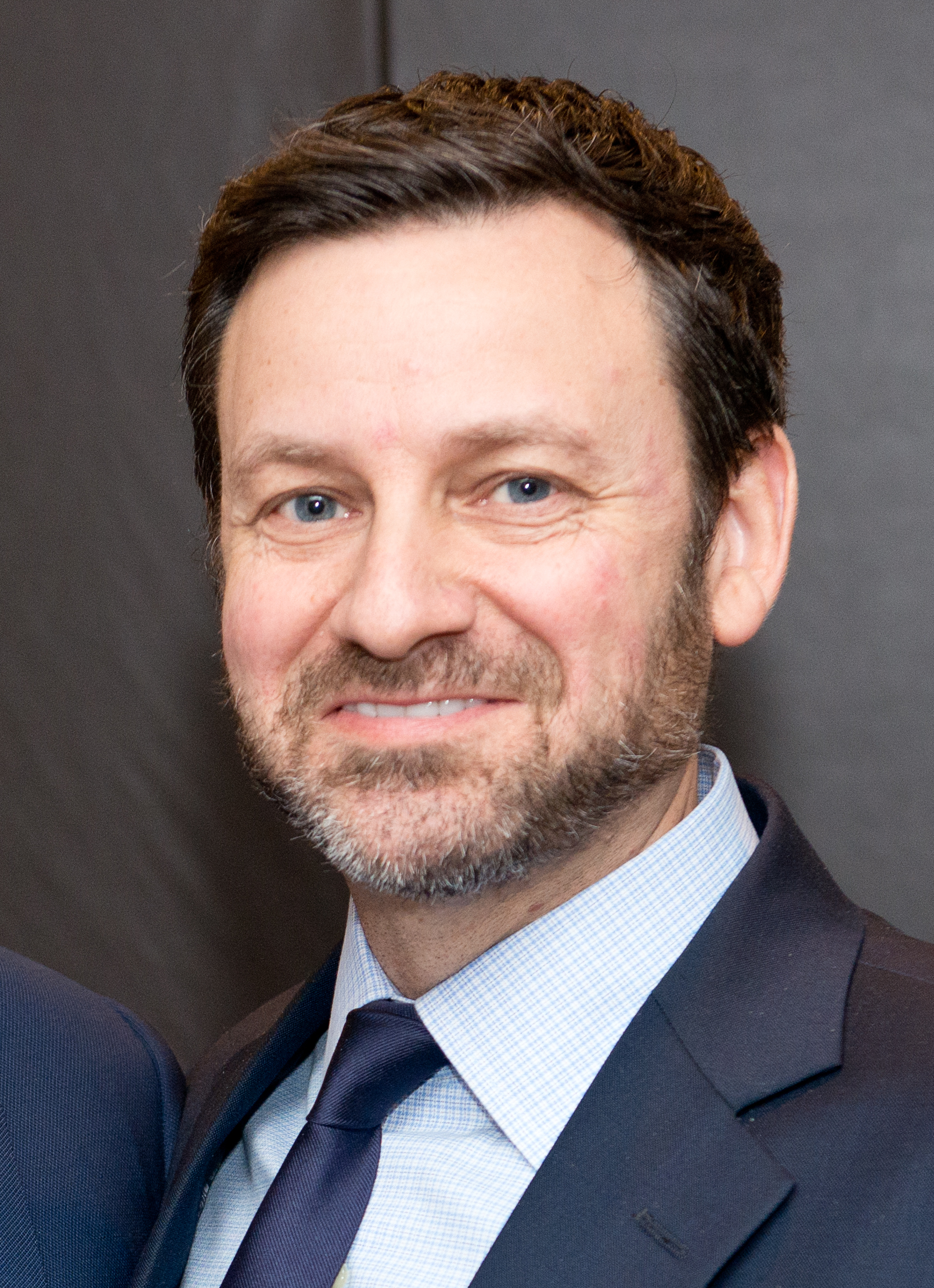
- Jay Ruderman, 2014
- Born: Jay Seth Ruderman; March 16, 1966 (age 60)
- Occupations: Activist and philanthropist
- Spouse: Shira Ruderman (m. 2002)
- Parent(s): Morton Edward Ruderman, Marcia Jortner Ruderman
- Website: Official website

Jay Seth Ruderman (born March 16, 1966) is an American lawyer, disability rights activist and philanthropist. He is the president of the Ruderman Family Foundation.

== Early life and education ==
Jay Seth Ruderman was born in Boston to Marcia and Morton Ruderman, the eldest of three children. Ruderman's father was a founder of Meditech. He was raised in a traditional Jewish home to Zionist parents. He visited Israel for the first time at the age of 13, as a gift for his bar-mitzvah. He attended public schools in Lynnfield, Massachusetts, and received his undergraduate degree in 1988 from Brandeis University, where he served as president of the student body in 1986–1987. He earned his JD from Boston University School of Law in 1993.

Ruderman is married to Israeli-American Shira Menashe Ruderman, who serves as executive director of the Ruderman Foundation. They live in the Greater Boston area and have four children.

== Career ==
Ruderman began his career as Assistant District Attorney in Salem, MA and also worked as deputy director of AIPAC in New England. In 2005, he enlisted in the Israel Defense Forces and became the liaison between the IDF and Diaspora Jewry. After his service, he returned to AIPAC as Leadership Director in Israel before assuming a position at the Ruderman Family Foundation.

In 2025, Ruderman was featured in the documentary True Value by Alexander Freeman, which is narrated by Chris Cooper, delves into the lives of several people’s experiences looking for meaningful employment, including Freeman himself, a filmmaker with cerebral palsy.

=== Activism ===
Ruderman is the president of the Ruderman Family Foundation, which advocates for disability rights. The foundation's first major project was inclusion of people with disabilities within the Jewish community, in Jewish day schools, summer camps and synagogues. Ruderman also hosts the podcast, "All About Change" (previously "All Inclusive"), which focuses on social justice and inclusion.

In 2014, the foundation expanded to the Hollywood entertainment industry, working for the inclusion of disabled characters in TV shows and movies, and advocating for those roles to be acted by people with disabilities. At the Sundance Film Festival in January 2020, Ruderman called for greater accessibility and the inclusion of people with disabilities and diversity. In March 2020, he sponsored an event to present Peter and Bobby Farrelly with an award for hiring actors with disabilities. He also worked with the Academy of Motion Picture Arts and Sciences to improve accessibility in the Oscars, being consulted in the Academy Museum of Motion Pictures' accessibility efforts as well as his advocacy resulting in the 2021 Oscars featuring its first integrated stage ramp and the 2024 Oscars including confidential accessibility requests for all attendees.

Ruderman has also proposed such changes to the Israeli film industry. In December 2021, he convinced four major Israeli broadcasting corporations to improve civil rights within the entertainment industry for people with disabilities.

In 2010, Ruderman partnered with the American Jewish Joint Distribution Committee and the Israeli government to fund inclusion for people with disabilities in Israel. This included programming to integrate people with disabilities into the work force, as well as support groups and independent living facilities.

In 2023, Ruderman focused on antisemitic tropes within film and television by engaging Hollywood celebrities. Ruderman promotes the accurate and diverse portrayal of the Jewish people, with the goal of challenging misconceptions about their uniform appearance.

=== Philanthropy ===
Ruderman served on the board of directors of the National Organization on Disability. He sits on the board of governors of the University of Haifa, the American Jewish Joint Distribution Committee, IMPACT-se, and is a member of the Brandeis University Board of Trustees. He was a member of the committee of the Jewish Agency for Israel.

== Views and opinions on Israel ==
Ruderman has sought to strengthen the relationship between American Jewry and Israeli opinion leaders. While serving in the IDF and becoming the military's liaison with world Jewry, he came to hold the belief that there exists a substantial gap between Israelis and Americans, arguing "that whatever Americans think is not necessarily what Israelis think." Ruderman has additionally expressed disappointment over Israel's stance on egalitarian prayer at the Western Wall and 2020 comments by Israel's then Minister of Education Rafi Peretz about the high rate of intermarriage among American Jews. Ruderman believes that the "doomsday talks" of an irreversible chasm between Israel and the American Jewish community are mistaken.

== Awards and recognition ==
- One of the 50 most influential Jews of the year, Jerusalem Post (2016, 2022)
- Jacob Rader Marcus Award from the American Jewish Archives (2019)
- Top 100 Most Influential Bostonians, Boston Magazine (2021)
- Lifetime Achievement Award, Jerusalem Post (2022)

== Books ==
In March 2025 Ruderman published his first book, Find Your Fight: Make Your Voice Heard for the Causes that Matter Most.
