= Lone Soldier Center =

Israeli non-profit supporting lone soldiers

- Founder: Michael Levin's friends
- Type: Non-profit
- Headquarters: Israel
- Services: Support for lone soldiers before, during, and after IDF service
- Volunteers: 300+

The Lone Soldier Center is a grass-roots Israeli non-profit founded by former lone soldiers to support the more than 7,000 lone soldiers serving in the Israel Defense Forces. Michael Levin was an American-born lone soldier who fell fighting in the Second Lebanon War. The Lone Soldier Center was created by a group of Levin's friends, fulfilling his dream that one day lone soldiers would have a home away from home to receive meals, advice and help.

The Center is managed by over 300 volunteers who work to provide support for lone soldiers. The Center aims to create a family-like environment to help lone soldiers thrive in Israel before, during and after their military service.

== History ==
Michael Levin, 22, fell in combat in the summer of 2006 in the Second Lebanon War during a mission to rescue two IDF soldiers who had been kidnapped by Hizbollah. Levin was a Philadelphia native who made Aliyah in 2002 to join the IDF. His dream was to one day create a center to serve lone soldiers from around the world. Tziki Aud became close to Michael Levin during Levin's service. He empathized with Levin's dream and decided to create the Lone Soldier Center to honor the death of Levin and preserve his memory.

Michael's parents, Harriet and Mark Levin, established the Michael Levin Lone Soldier Foundation https://michaellevinlonesoldier.org/ to fulfill Michael’s dream of helping lone soldiers before, during, and after their service. The foundation funds programs and services in Israel which make the greatest impact on serving lone soldiers of the IDF.

== Mission ==
The Lone Soldier Center supports lone soldiers before, during, and after their IDF service.

The Lone Soldier Center's goal is to provide them with an equal opportunity to succeed both in the army and in civilian life following their release. The Lone Soldier Center (LSC) builds a family and community for lone soldiers and takes care of their many needs (primarily off of base). The LSC provides lone soldiers with personal and individual care, and an opportunity to meet and network with their peer group, growing their social circle (as primarily new immigrants in a new country - the wider their circle of friends and connections, the greater their chances to succeed).

The organization's mission includes:

- Educating and guiding lone soldiers in their transition to life in Israel.
- Acting to strengthen the Lone Soldier community in Israel and better connect them community to Israeli society.

An opinion piece published by the Jerusalem Post in July 2014 described the Lone Soldier Center as “a grassroots, nonprofit organization created by former lone soldiers to assist the next generation of lone soldiers in all aspects of life, in the military and out.”

The Lone Soldier Center provides help, accommodation, meals and guidance to thousands of Israel's lone soldiers annually.

== Locations ==
Most Lone Soldier Center locations are called moadonim (club houses). The first and largest "moadon" is in downtown Jerusalem. A Tel Aviv branch opened in 2013 in memory of John and Elly Haven and with contributions from Christians for Israel The Netherlands. The Be'er Sheva and the Haifa satellite branches have closed, but Be'er Sheva still maintains two volunteer missions, North and South.

In addition to the moadonim, The Lone Soldier Center has long-term leases on homes, where it houses lone soldiers from diverse backgrounds across the country. There is a women's home located in Jerusalem, and additional buildings in Beit Shemesh, Herzliya and Petach Tikva where 150 lone soldiers are housed.

== Shabbat meals ==
The Lone Soldier Center provides Friday night dinner to over 400 soldiers per month, according to the IDF.

== Events ==
The Lone Soldier Center hosts a number of activities to help build a lone soldier community and allow international lone soldiers to adjust to Israeli life. Some of these take place weekly, like yoga, Ulpan Hebrew lessons, and a running group, members of which participate in the annual Jerusalem Marathon as part of "Team Mikey." The organization also holds a number of meals and parties on Thursday, Friday, and Saturday nights each month.

=== Thanksgiving dinners ===
The organization hosts an annual Thanksgiving dinner for lone soldiers. Hundreds of lone soldiers show up for the event to eat turkey together and watch American football. In 2013, the event was held in conjunction with the Israel Forever foundation.

== Advising ==
The Lone Soldier Center has a team of trained advisors, all of whom are themselves former lone soldiers. Tziki Aud is the group's senior advisor. Advisors offer counsel to lone soldiers before, during, and after their service, giving them information on everything from how to adequately prepare for the service to how to handle the emotional stresses of the army to how to find a job after being released.

== Leadership and staff ==
The Lone Soldier Center is led by a professional staff of twenty, and over 300 volunteers, many of whom were lone soldiers themselves. Board members have included historian and Ambassador Michael Oren, as well as Prof. Moshe Ben Bassat, and Ari Abramowtiz.
