= Ghost Unit (Israel Defense Forces) =

Platoon in the Israel Defense Forces

The 9th Platoon of the Auxiliary Company of the 202nd Battalion of the Israeli army's Paratrooper Brigade, also known as the Ghost Unit, is an elite 21-member unit of snipers active during the Gaza War. Many members of the unit are dual nationals of Israel and other countries. During the war, members of the unit were documented killing unarmed civilians in Gaza, and the subject of criminal complaints filed in Germany, Italy, and France, along with investigations in South Africa and Belgium.

== History ==
In the early stages of the Gaza War, members of the Ghost Unit served in Gaza.

== Members ==
- Daniel Raab, an American and Israeli national from Chicago.
- Elias Gibson, an American national
- Daniel Graetz, a German from Munich
- Alon Ben Sira, a dual Belgian and Israeli national from Uccle
- Sasha Aknin, a dual French and Israeli national
- Gabriel Ben Haim, a dual French and Israeli national
- Aaron Bayhack, a South African national

== Investigations ==
In October 2024, independent Palestinian journalist Younis Tirawi posted a 38-minute documentary on the IDF's Ghost Units investigating the killing of unarmed civilians in Gaza. Ghost Unit member Daniel Raab gave an interview for the documentary, noting how his unit shot unarmed civilians. Raab stated:

If they are in an area designated as a combat zone, and they are men of military age, then we shoot. The question of women and children is debated with command... As a sniper, you have a lot of independence, a lot of responsibility, and a lot of room for judgement... In some cases, they say yes or no, and in others, they say yes when you think it should be no... and then it’s up to you. You shoot.

In September 2025, The Guardian published an investigation showing Raab shot and killed 19-year-old Salem Doghmosh on November 22, 2023. Salem was unarmed and Raab noted he shot him because he was trying to retrieve the body of his older brother Mohammed. In an interview, Raab stated "It's hard for me to understand why he [did that] and it also doesn't really interest me. I mean, what was so important about that corpse?” Raab said that it was "wrong" for Palestinians to think that they would not be shot because they were "wearing civilian clothes" and were "not carrying a weapon", with Raab further specifying: "That's what you have snipers for." Raab elaborated that his sniper team would shoot unarmed Palestinians based on "distance. There is a line that we define. They don't know where this line is, but we do."

On October 10, 2024, Belgium's federal prosecutor office opened an inquiry into Ghost Unit member Alon Ben Sira for possible war crimes.

On October 28, 2024, South African Police Hawks' Crimes Against the State Unit announced an investigation into Ghost Unit member Aaron Bayhack, identified in investigative journalist Younis Tirawi's documentary. Vuyolwethu Zungula, a Member of the National Assembly of South Africa, subsequently referenced Bayhack's involvement in the Gaza War within a question to the Minister of Home Affairs, inquiring as to the status of Bayhack's South African citizenship and his alleged violation of the section 3(1) of the Prohibition of Mercenary Activities and Regulation of Certain Activities in Country of Armed Conflict Act, Act No. 27 of 2006 by serving in the Israeli army.

On September 11, 2025, the Council on American‑Islamic Relations (CAIR‑Chicago) issued a statement demanding the US Department of Justice open a criminal investigation under the War Crimes Act against Ghost Unit member Daniel Raab. On October 15, 2025, the Center for International Policy published an article by Abdelhalim Abdelrahman calling for the Ghost Unit to be "subject to rigorous Leahy Law vetting".

== Criminal complaints ==
On July 1, 2024, the International Federation for Human Rights (FIDH) filed a civil complaint before the War Crimes Unit of the Paris Tribunal against French-Israeli soldiers Sasha A. and Gabriel B.

On July 28, 2025, the StraLi, an Italian civil society organization, announced it had filed a complaints against an Israeli-Italian citizen in the Ghost Unit.

On September 10, 2025, the European Center for Constitutional and Human Rights and three Palestinian human rights groups filed a 130-page criminal complaint against Daniel Graetz with Germany's federal prosecutor alleging members of the Ghost Unit deliberately killed civilians in Gaza, documented by audiovisual recordings and investigative research.

On June 17, 2026, the Hind Rajab Foundation filed a criminal complaint against Belgium-Israeli citizen and member of the Ghost Unit, Alon ben Sira.
