= Timeline of the 2012 Gaza War =

The 2012 Israeli operation in the Gaza Strip was a military operation carried out in the Gaza Strip by the Israel Defense Forces starting on 14 November 2012, following rocket attacks on Israeli territory launched from Gaza during the preceding days.

== Timeline ==
=== 10 November ===
According to the Israeli government, the round of escalation that led to the operation began on November 10 when an anti-tank missile from Gaza struck an IDF jeep near the Karni crossing wounding four soldiers, two seriously. Four Palestinian teenagers, aged 16 to 18, were killed by an Israeli airstrike in a sports stadium while they played soccer.

=== 11 November ===
Rocket and mortar shell fire into Israel continued and increased the following day, a total of 64 rockets hits were identified on November 11. Rockets with longer ranges were fired and the damage incurred was greater, a number of Israeli civilians were wounded by the rocket fire, several were treated for shock and there was extensive property damage.

=== 12 November ===
21 rockets were launched into Israel from Gaza.

=== 13 November ===
As of November 13, 121 rockets were fired into Israeli territory, as well as a number of mortar shells.

=== 14 November (Start of Operation Pillar of Defense) ===
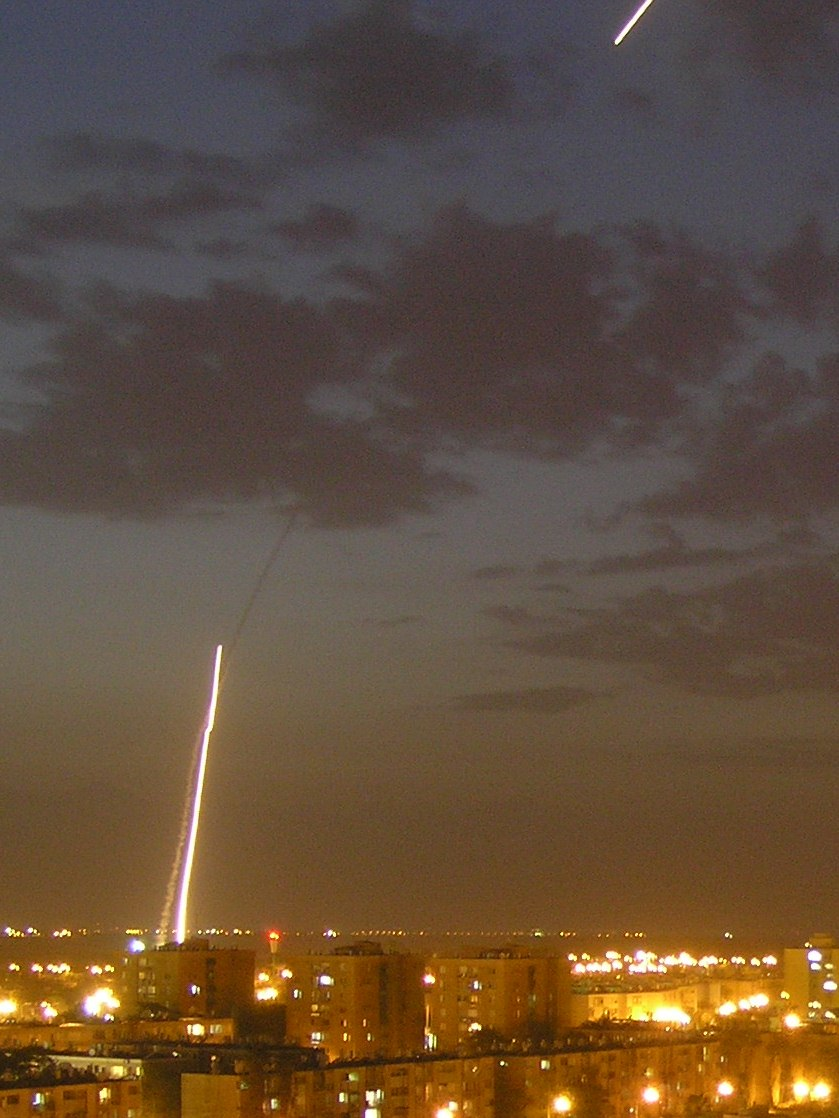
Iron Dome intercepting a rocket above a populated Israeli area during the fourth day of the operation

At approximately 16:00 (Israel time), the Israeli Air Force killed Ahmed Jabari, chief of Hamas's military wing, who was wanted by Israel for masterminding a string of deadly attacks and 'decade-long terrorist activities'. Osama Hamdan, a Hamas representative in Lebanon, claimed that the airstrike also killed Jabari's son. Hamdan's claim was quickly shown to be false. The IDF released a video of this airstrike. The IDF also struck against 20 Hamas targets in the Gaza Strip, including underground rocket launchers and an ammunition warehouse stocking Iranian-made, long-range Fajr-5 missiles. The IDF said that many of the targeted weapon stashes were in residential areas and evidenced "the pattern of Hamas to use the population in Gaza as human shields." Israel claims to have destroyed most of this long-range capability. An IDF spokesman said that the goal of the operation is to "bring back quiet to southern Israel, and... to strike at terror organizations." At the same time, Israeli spokespersons said that it would try "to avoid civilian casualties."

10 people including 2 children were killed in Israeli strikes. An 11-month-old Omar Misharawi, son of Jihad Misharawi, a BBC Arabic video editor residing in Gaza, was killed when a Palestinian rocket launched towards Israel fell short and exploded back into Gaza.

Gazan militants continued to fire rockets towards the Israeli cities of Beersheba, Ashdod, Ofakim and the Shaar Hanegev and Eshkol Regional Council. The Iron Dome missile defense system made 130 interceptions. About 55 rockets were launched on the evening of 14 November, including a Grad rocket fired in the direction of the Negev Nuclear Research Center near Dimona. On the night of 14 November, Prime Minister Benjamin Netanyahu announced that the Israeli cabinet had authorized a partial call-up of reservists in case they were needed for a large ground-based operation.

The Egyptian military confirmed that four rockets were fired from Sinai toward Israel by militant groups in an area with a history in the prior eighteen months of cross-border shootings and rocket launches.

The United Nations confirmed that Marwan Abu El Qumsan, a teacher for the United Nations Relief and Works Agency was killed in his car near the scene of an airstrike. His brother, who was also with him, was severely injured.

=== 15 November ===
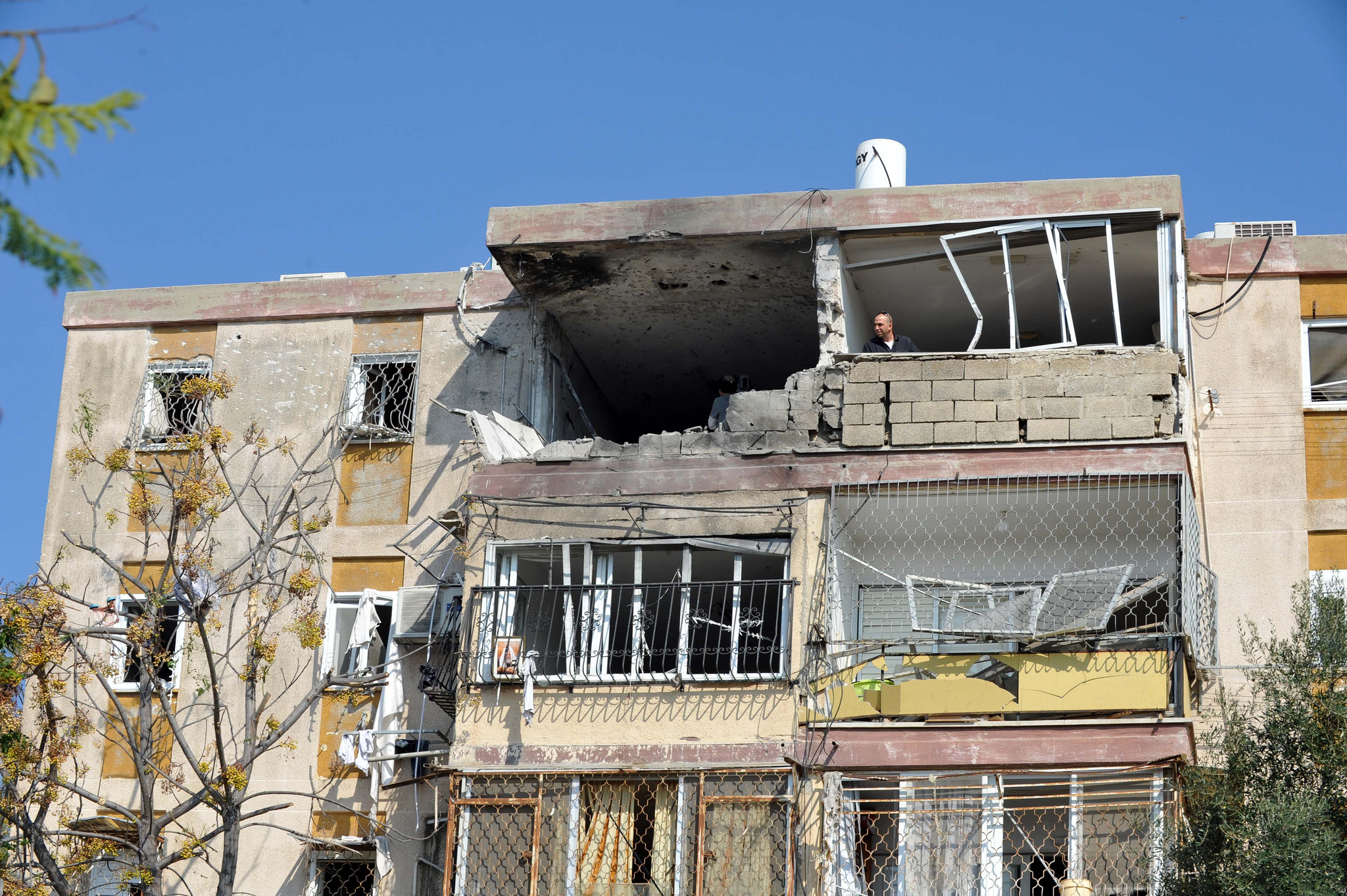
Israeli apartment building in Kiryat Malakhi hit by Gaza rockets

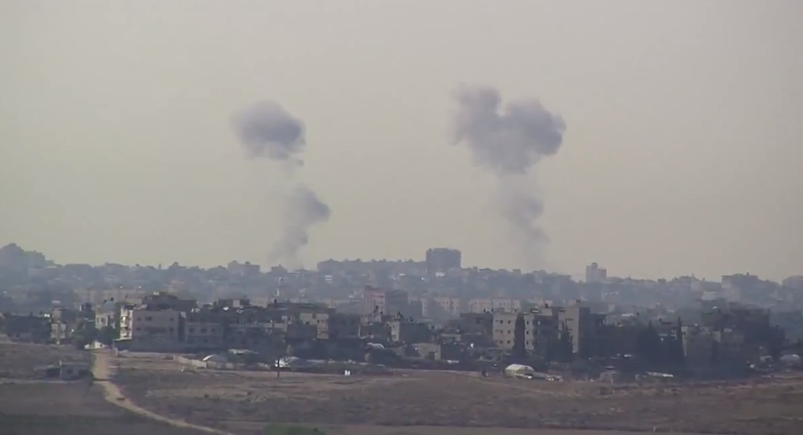
Rising smoke in Gaza after it was hit by Israeli airstrikes

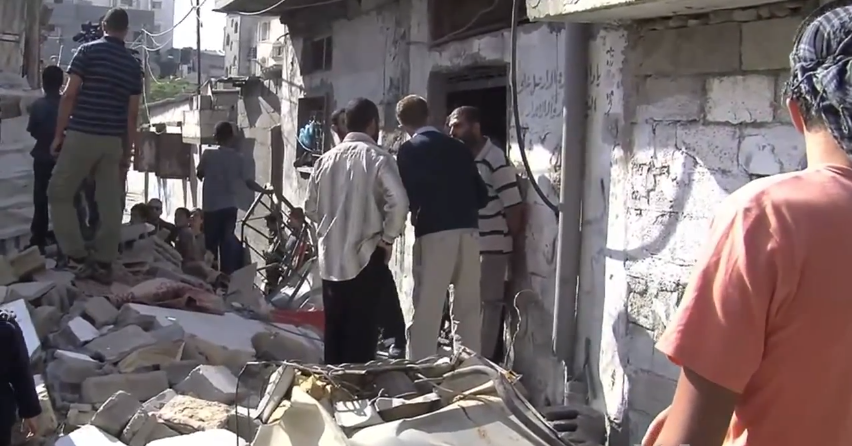
A Gaza house destroyed by Israeli shelling

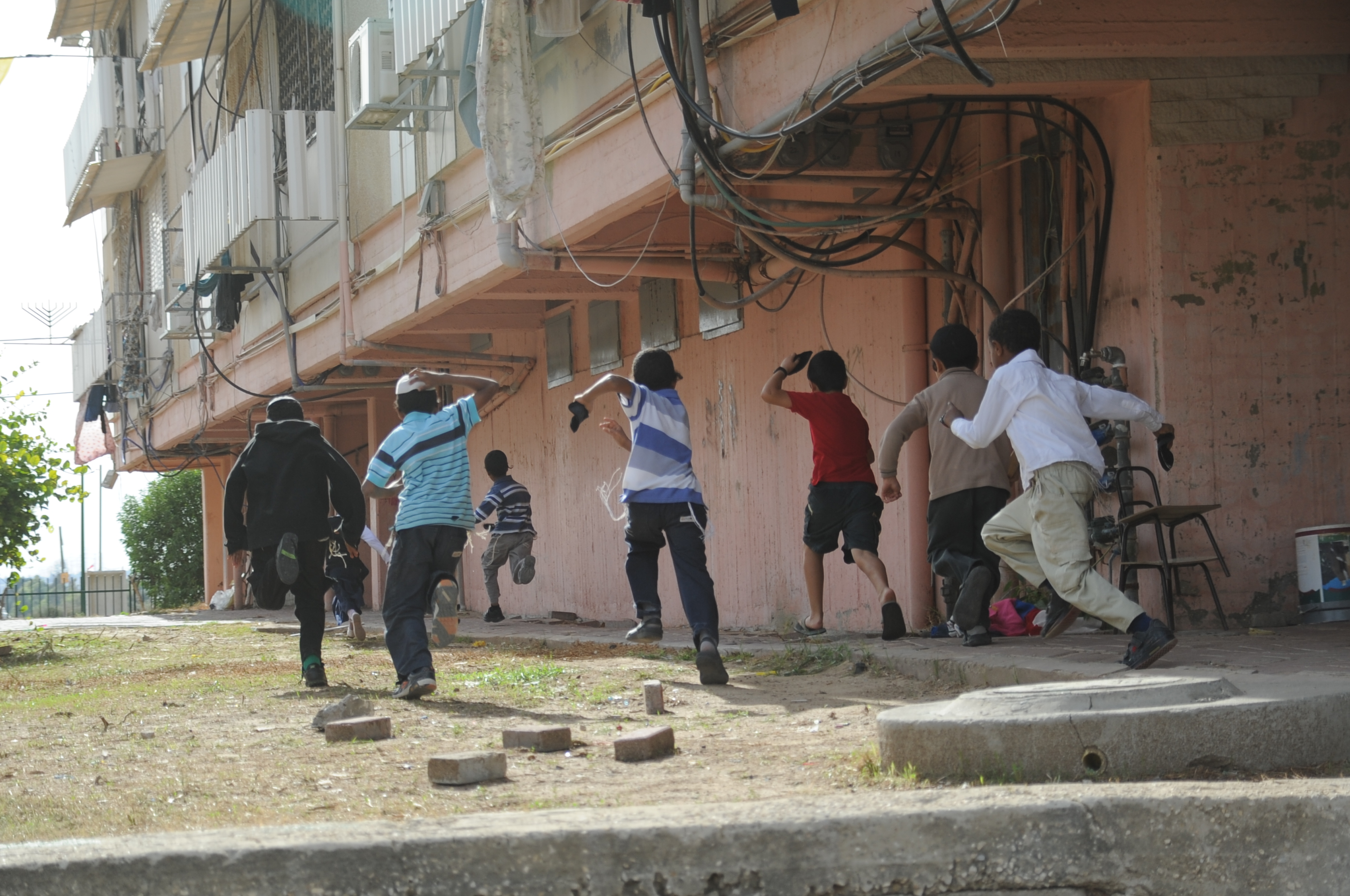
Children from the Israeli town of Kiryat Malachi running for shelter as rockets are fired from Gaza

Israel continued its offensive through the night, carrying out over 100 strikes on targets in Gaza. An IDF spokesperson stated that seven militants had been killed in the overnight attacks.

On 15 November, 13 Israelis were treated for injuries suffered during the morning. Three Israelis, two men and a woman, were killed when a rocket struck a four-story building in Kiryat Malakhi. Magen David Adom paramedics treated five wounded people at the scene, including an 11-month-old child who was critically injured. A further five missiles were fired at the town as emergency services attempted to rescue those trapped inside the debris. A residence in Ashdod and a school in Ofakim were struck by rockets. During the morning the Israeli air force continued flying sorties to both to identify and destroy targets in the Gaza strip. The attacks included an airstrike on Khan Younis, in the Southern Gaza Strip, that led to the injury of four people including a woman and two children, according to Palestinian sources.

Israel put all of its communities with less than 15 seconds of warning from mortar/rocket attack in lockdown and closed all schools in less than 60-second warning radius. The Israeli air force distributed leaflets over Gaza telling residents to keep a distance away from Hamas facilities and their forces.

Two Fajr rockets landed in the suburbs of Tel Aviv metropolis. No injuries were reported. This was the first time that Gush Dan has been targeted by missiles since the Persian Gulf War, when Saddam Hussein launched a number of Scud missiles at Israel. On the night of 15 November, the Israeli Air Force launched a series of 70 bombing runs to destroy what it said were underground medium-range rocket launchers. Palestinian sources said that 15 people were killed in Gaza as a result of the IAF strikes, including five militants and two children during the airstrikes.

=== 16 November ===
The prime minister of Egypt, Hisham Qandil, paid a visit to the Gaza Strip on 16 November. His official purpose of the visit was to "show solidarity with the Palestinian people." He arranged for a 3-hour ceasefire to accommodate his visit. About 50 rockets were fired from the Gaza Strip during this window hitting sites in southern Israel. Hamas argued that the IDF bombed a Hamas commander's house in Gaza during the ceasefire, something the IDF strongly denied, and accused Hamas of violating the cease fire.

Mohammed Sadallah, a four-year-old Gazan boy, was killed after an explosion in Annazla. Initially it was stated by Hamas to have been caused by an Israeli bomb. However, experts from the Palestinian Centre for Human Rights examined the site and opined the explosion was caused by a Palestinian rocket. They boy's mother acknowledged that either case could be possible. According to the New York Times, "the damage was nowhere near severe enough to have come from an Israeli F-16, raising the possibility that an errant missile fired by Palestinian militants was responsible for the deaths." Israel denied that it carried out any attacks in the area at the time. The Associated Press reported that "no one appeared to have witnessed the strike" and that "local security officials quickly took what remained of the projectile, making it impossible to verify who fired it." The Egyptian prime minister was filmed lifting the body saying "the boy, the martyr...is something that we cannot keep silent about," before promising to defend the Palestinian people.

Through the evening of 16 November, around 500 rockets were fired from Gaza. Iron Dome intercepted 184 of these. Israel at this point had bombed about 500 targets in Gaza. Palestinian militants fired a rocket aimed at Gush Etzion setting off air raid sirens in nearby Jerusalem. A rocket struck a home in Ashdod wounding five Israeli civilians.

Also that evening, the Israeli cabinet approved expanding the cap on reservist call-ups from 30,000 to 75,000. Foreign Minister Avigdor Lieberman said that the government was not considering an overthrow of the Hamas-led government in Gaza.

=== 17 November ===
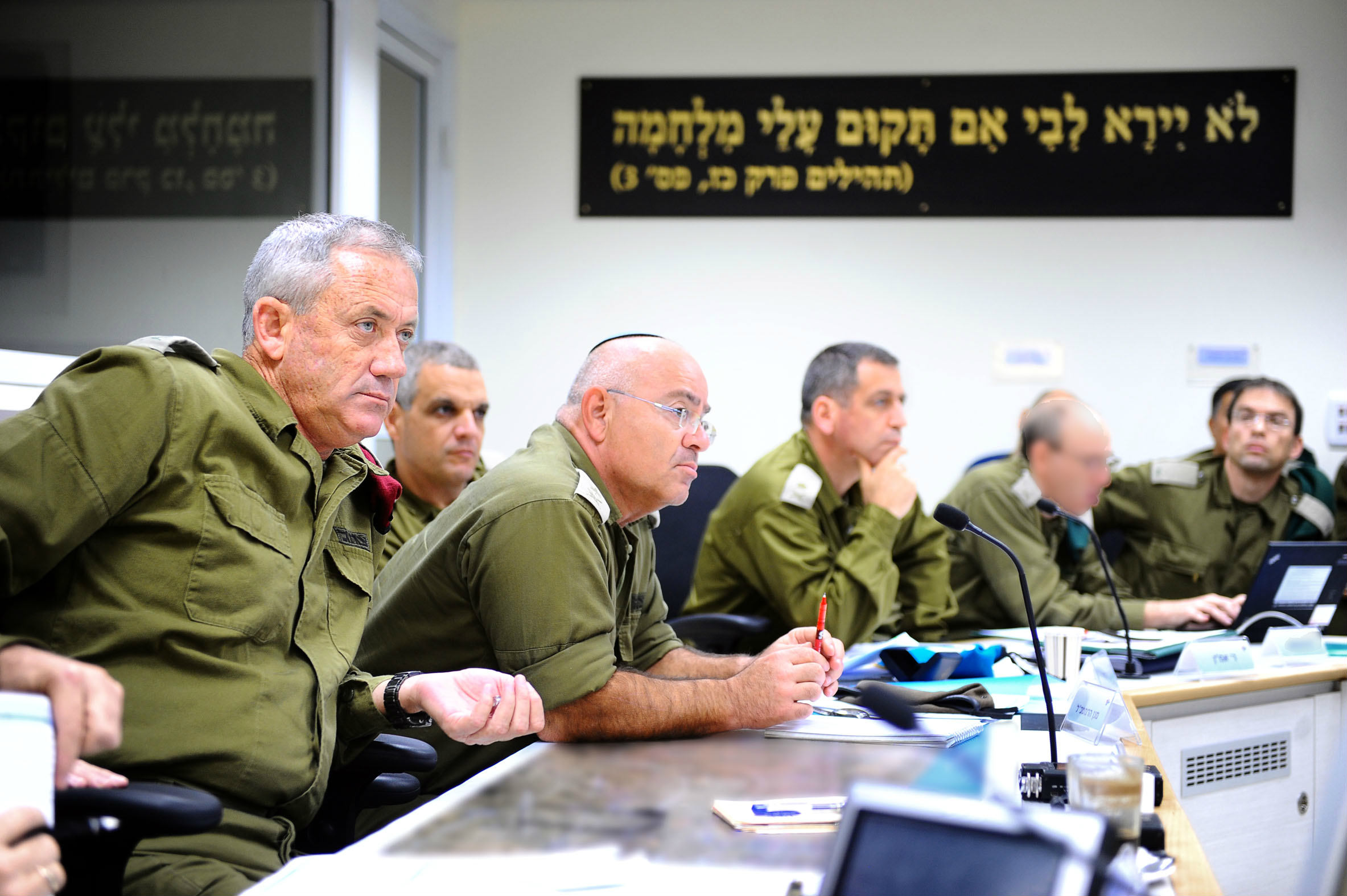
IDF Chief of Staff, Lt. Gen. Benny Gantz, and senior officers in a situational assessment regarding the operation, 17 November.

The IDF broadened its targets in the offensive from military targets to include Hamas government sites, with an Israeli air strike destroying the office building of the Hamas Prime Minister Ismail Haniyeh in Gaza. 30 people were rescued from the rubble of the building.

The World Health Organization reported that "Gaza hospitals are overwhelmed with casualties from Israel's bombings and face critical shortages of drugs and medical supplies." According to the Health Ministry officials in Gaza "382 people have been injured – 245 adults and 137 children." Israel's Defense Ministry announced it will open the Kerem Shalom border crossing to allow civilian supplies to reach Gaza.

Israel's Interior Minister Eli Yishai explained the offensive as aiming to "send Gaza back to the Middle Ages" by destroying infrastructure, including roads and wells.

Over 70 rockets were launched at Southern Israel. According to Magen David Adom, Palestinian rocket attacks injured sixteen Israelis and twenty Israelis were treated for shock. Two Fajr-5 missiles aimed at Tel Aviv were intercepted by the Iron Dome. Two rockets also landed outside Jerusalem. A home in Ashdod was directly hit, wounding five Israeli civilians. Two rockets were fired at Rishon Lezion and houses were damaged in Eshkol and Be'er Tuviya by missiles; one rocket fell near a Palestinian village in the West Bank damaging properties.

According to CNN, the Israeli government is moving tanks and soldiers in preparation for what could be a ground invasion of Gaza. In the West Bank, several demonstrations in support of Gaza led to dozens of protesters injured and several arrested by Israeli forces.

=== 18 November ===
Israel continued to bombard the Gaza Strip, and, for the first time, Israeli ships fired shells too. The IDF killed the head of Hamas' rocket program, Yahyia Byya, who according to IDF sources, had been responsible for most of the rocket attacks. Two buildings housing journalists were hit by IDF. The first housed Sky News and other international journalists. No one was injured. Another media tower was hit, with reports of 7 injured Palestinian journalists. The tower, known as the Al-Sharouk compound, contained the offices of Al-Quds TV, Sky News, ARD, Kuwait TV, RAI, and ITN, and had previously also been used by BBC. The IDF said that it targeted Hamas communications devices located on the roofs of two media buildings. It alleged Hamas was using journalists as human shields. Reporters without Borders (an international NGO focused on issues of freedom of the press) issued a strong condemnation of the attacks. Christophe Deloire, the director of RWB, described the attacks as unjustified and as a threat to freedom of information, stating that "even though the outlets targeted are linked to Hamas, it does not legitimize the attacks." The attacks injured five people; one cameraman lost his leg. Lieutenant Colonel Avital Leibovich responded by urging journalists to avoid areas with any Hamas presence whatsoever, while another Israeli government official stated that the offices of both Al Quds and Al Aqsa were legitimate military targets. Sam Kiley, a correspondent for Sky News who was present during the attack, said that there was 'reason to disbelieve' Israel's official account of the incident, and that he believes the incident demonstrates that no civilian in Gaza can feel safe. The Foreign Press Association also issued a statement expressing concern over the strike, and pointing to a UN Security Council statement that condemned all attacks against journalists in combat zones.

Rockets were launched from Gaza towards Tel-Aviv, which were intercepted by Tel Aviv's iron dome. According to Hamas television, the rockets were launched by the Qassam Brigades. Several rockets were fired at the south of Israel, one struck a building in Ashkelon injuring two people. The Iron Dome intercepted another two rockets fired at the city. A rescue service worker in his 20s from the Sha'ar Hanegev was seriously wounded by a rocket that struck the area. Three rockets struck the city of Beersheba and a home in Sderot. Two rockets hit Ashdod after coming under fire from a large rocket salvo. In Ofakim, a rocket struck a car wounding five people including couple and their two-year-old daughter. An elderly woman was injured by shrapnel from a rocket that struck a building in the city. Three rockets fell in the Eshkol area.

Israel facilitated the passage of eighty trucks loaded with medical supplies and food into the Gaza Strip through the Kerem Shalom crossing. The Israeli Foreign Ministry stated that Hamas refused to allow 22 foreign nationals to leave the Gaza Strip including nine Italian citizens, one Canadian, one South Korean, a French national, six journalists from Japan, and two Turkish Red Crescent members. Israel accused Hamas of manipulating and pressuring the press.

Benjamin Netanyahu told his cabinet that the Israel Defense Forces were prepared for a "significant expansion of the operation." British foreign secretary William Hague told Sky News that a ground offensive would lose Israel much international support, but blamed Hamas for instigating the conflict and urged them to cease their rocket fire.

A 13-year-old girl and her uncle were killed by the Israeli naval shelling while sitting on the beach near Gaza city. Another student died by an Israeli airstrike at an open area of the UNRWA Beach Preparatory Girls’ School. The strike caused another fatality. Six more were reported as being injured, including a female clerk at the school.

==== Al-Dalu family deaths ====
In the Nasser neighborhood, an IDF missile destroyed the family home of Jamal Mahmoud Yassin al-Dalu, 52, killing twelve people: ten of his family members, including five children and an elderly woman, plus two of the family's neighbors, including another elderly woman — the highest death toll of any single strike during the Operation. Fourteen more people were killed in total in the other attacks of that day. According to Israel, the target was Yehiya Rabiah, allegedly a senior commander of rocket operations. A relative of the al-Dalu family said, however, people in the area have never heard of the man before. "I have never heard such a name (Yihia Abayah). This is nonsense", he said to Reuters. The IDF now says of the strike that it was intentional and that the target was Mohamed al-Dalu, a police officer who died in the strike. After the change in explanation, IDF spokeswoman Avital Leibovich accused him of being "a known terror operative affiliated with the military wing of Hamas", though neighbors of the family state there is no connection between the al-Dalu family and militant groups. The Palestinian Centre for Human Rights called the strike "blatant targeting of civilians". Scholars generally regard police officers as lawful targets if they are incorporated into a military force, or if they participate in hostilities.

=== 19 November ===
Israel launched attacks on Gaza Strip near dawn on 19 November. Four people, including a 4-year-old child and two women, both 19, were killed in the az-Zeitoun neighborhood of Gaza City, when the houses of the Abu Zour family, the Azzam family and al-Qattaty family were attacked. Palestinian medics additionally reported that Rana ash-Shandi, 18 months old, was killed in an IDF strike in as-Saraya.

IDF stated that since the beginning of Operation Pillar of Defense, over 540 rockets were fired from Gaza have hit and 290 were intercepted in-flight over populated areas in Israel. Over 135 rockets were fired from Gaza at areas of Southern Israel. Sirens were again sounded as multiple rockets were fired into Ashkelon; most were intercepted but two rockets struck a house and a yard. Another struck a school parking lot. Three people were treated for shock. Seven rockets launched at Ashkelon and Ashdod, and another towards Beersheba, were intercepted. A 63-year-old man was wounded by shrapnel in the Bnei Shimon Regiona. The Sderot and Eshkol regions come under heavy fire, rockets struck near Sha'ar Hanegev. A woman was injured from a mortar in the Eshkol area. It was aired live on Al Jazeera English as a correspondent was reporting. A salvo of rockets struck the cities of Ashdod and Gan Yavne. Later during the day, a second school was struck by a rocket destroying the building after a barrage of rockets targeted Ashkelon during the evening. Mayor Benny Vaknin said that the rocket, after destroying the roof, "tore apart an entire classroom. Hundreds of shards of metal were scattered in the school's yard. Had the schools here been open we would have seen disasters." Israeli paramedics treated sixteen casualties taking the number of wounded treated by Magen David Adom to over 252. Rockets also exploded near Ofakim.

At 2 am local time, a building housing the second largest police facility in Gaza was hit by an Israeli airstrike. The airstrike was aired live on CNN and Al Jazeera English as their correspondents were reporting.

The Israel Air Force hit four Islamic Jihad militants hiding out in a media center in Gaza, the Al-Sharouk compound. PIJ reported by text message that one of their senior militant operatives, Ramez Harb, was killed in that airstrike in Gaza City. The same strike also killed Salem Paul Sweliem, a 52-year-old Greek Orthodox Christian carpenter.

An airstrike hit the Jabalia Refugee Camp, killing two children.

=== 20 November ===
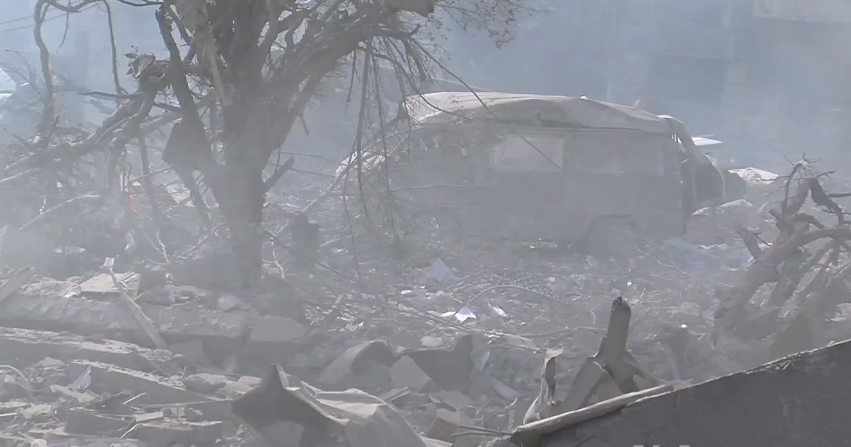
Wreckage of Hamas Government building, after an Israeli strike

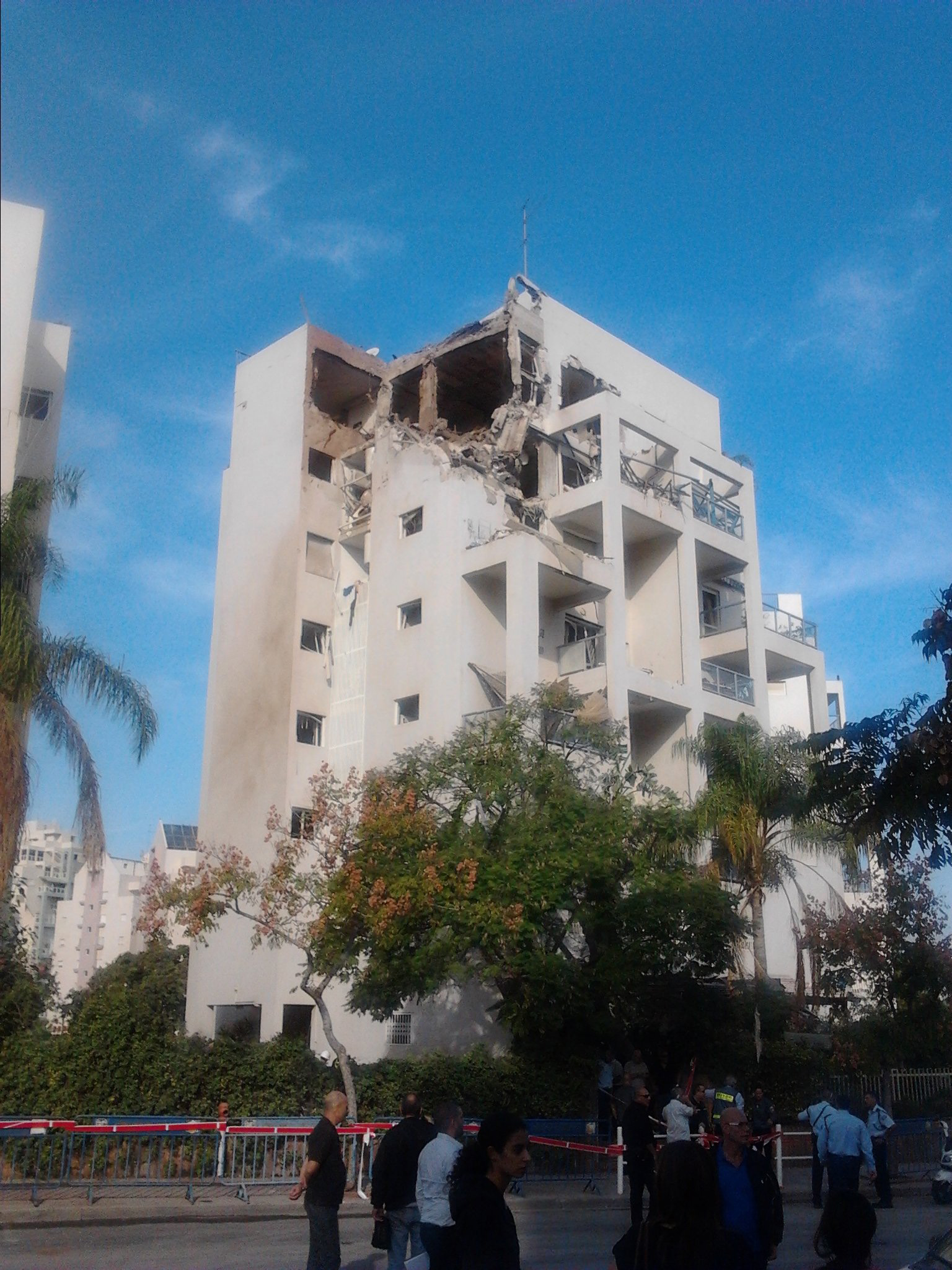
Residential apartment building in Rishon LeZion hit by a Palestinian rocket

More than 80 rockets were fired towards Southern Israel. An Israeli Bedouin civilian was killed in Palestinian rocket fire that struck the Bedouin village of Rejwan in the Negev. Palestinian militants fired 18 rockets at Beersheba. At least 9 were intercepted by the Iron Dome, while three landed in the city. One landed near a bus, which suffered shrapnel damage, another damaged a vehicle, and the third landed in a soccer field. Rockets were also fired at Ashkelon; one was intercepted and another landed in an open area. The city's Barzilai Medical Center relocated its emergency room to its fortified basement after rocket shrapnel struck near the hospital's maternity ward. There was also rocket fire at Ofakim. For the second time, sirens sounded in Jerusalem, and two rockets were fired at the city, but landed in an open area of the West Bank between two Palestinian villages. Dozens of rockets struck Kiryat Malakhi, Sderot and Ashdod. Thirteen rockets were fired at the Eshkol Regional Council, killing an Israeli soldier deployed in the vicinity of Gaza and an Israeli civilian. Later during the day, a rocket struck Eshkol wounding five people. Two rockets were fired at Jerusalem. A rocket struck a six-story building in Rishon LeZion injuring four people.

Israeli aircraft and artillery struck eleven militant cells and thirty rocket launchers in Gaza. Three Hamas fighters were killed, two of whom were involved in rocket attacks. It was reported that the IDF had destroyed 50 weapons smuggling tunnels since the start of the operation. Drones attacked two cars in Sabra, Gaza, killing six, some of whom were injured beyond identification. Four people were killed at Gaza's Baghdad street. In Zeitoun, Gaza, two children were killed by Israeli airstrikes while they were playing soccer.

Hamas gunmen in Gaza executed six Palestinians who were accused of collaborating with Israel. According to a Hamas security source quoted on Hamas' Aqsa Radio, the men were "caught red-handed" with cameras and hi-tech equipment. The body of one of the alleged collaborators was chained to a motorcycle and dragged through the streets.

In the West Bank, Palestinians protested the Israeli attacks at multiple locations. In some instances, protesters threw stones and Molotov cocktails at IDF troops and Israel Border Police gendarmes, who responded with crowd-dispersal means. One Palestinian man was shot dead in Halhul after attacking a soldier, and another Palestinian was shot while throwing a Molotov cocktail at an Israeli neighborhood in Hebron. In addition, Palestinians pelted Israeli civilian vehicles, attempted to block a road, and laid stones which caused damage to civilian vehicles.

The building housing Agence France-Presse's office was hit by Israel. Three rockets were reported to have hit the building. No one was injured. IDF says they were targeting a Hamas intelligence operations center on 7th floor of the building. A missile strike killed three Palestinian journalists in their cars. Two of the journalists were cameramen for Al-Aqsa. Another missile killed an employee for Al Quds Educational Radio while he was driving in his car. Israel acknowledged the attack, claiming they had ties to militants and were Hamas operatives.

United States Secretary of State Hillary Clinton arrived in Tel Aviv in a visit to Israel to try to promote a ceasefire. She had talks with Israeli prime minister Benjamin Netanyahu. She did not meet with Hamas, due to the United States designating Hamas as a terrorist organization. Egypt's president Mohammed Morsi declared on the 20th that there would be a deal that day. However, talks failed and violence continued. A Hamas spokesman said later that night that a deal was close.

=== 21 November ===
Israeli aircraft attacked a Gazan militant cell preparing to fire rockets from the Jabalia neighborhood. They also struck militants in Khan Younis that were preparing to fire rockets into Israel. An airstrike against the Nusseirat refugee camp killed a 4 year old Gazan girl and wounded her mother. Six people were killed in air strikes on Gaza City. An 80-year-old man and his teenage granddaughter were killed in a raid on Khan Yunis. Airstrikes struck three tunnels and two underground rocket launchers. Two Palestinians were killed shortly after the announcement and shortly before the ceasefire officially began at 9PM.

116 rockets were fired from Gaza into Israel. Seven people were wounded when a rocket struck the Eshkol region. A barrage of rockets was fired at Sdot Negev and two rockets struck Hof Ashkelon and Sha'ar Hanegev. Several rockets were fired at Beer Sheva, one hitting a home. Two rockets targeted Bnei Shimon and a rocket struck a building in Netivot injuring one person. A rocket exploded close to a building in Ashdod and two rockets fell in the Beer Tuvia Region damaging a building and injuring a woman. Al Jazeera's bureau in Gaza City was damaged after an airstrike hit the nearby Abu Khadra government building. The office of the Associated Press was also damaged. The building housing Agence France-Presse's office in Gaza city was attacked twice; the second strike killed a 2-year-old child who was in the neighborhood.

The 2012–13 UEFA Europa League game between Hapoel Ironi Kiryat Shmona F.C. and Athletic Bilbao which was scheduled to take place on 22 November at the Kiryat Eliezer Stadium in Haifa is postponed by UEFA due to the tense security situation in the region.

==== Tel Aviv bus bombing ====
An explosion on a bus in Tel Aviv wounded at least 28 people, including three seriously. The blast on the bus occurred in an area with many office buildings and heavy pedestrian traffic. The bus bombing complicated efforts to reach a truce and was the first notable bombing in Tel Aviv since 2006. The United Nations, US, UK, France and Russia all condemned the attack against civilians which was described by Israel as a terrorist attack. UN Secretary-General Ban Ki-moon deplored the attack saying "there are no circumstances that justify the targeting of civilians." The White House said that "today's terrorist attack" and attacks against innocent Israeli civilians were "outrageous", and the Russian foreign ministry termed the attack a "criminal terrorist act." Britain's Foreign Secretary said following the attack that "we are clear that terrorists must not be allowed to set the agenda." The French foreign minister similarly condemned it saying it took place during efforts to secure a ceasefire.

Khaled Mashal, leader of Hamas, categorically rejected any connection of the bombing to his group. Hamas spokesperson, Fawzi Barhoum, praised the attack, calling it the "natural response to the occupation crimes and ongoing massacres against civilians in the Gaza Strip" The bus bombing was lauded from a Gaza mosque's loudspeakers and celebratory gunfire was heard when news of the bombing was reported. Hamas' television featured people praising the attack.
