= Al-Dalu family killing =

Israeli airstrike in Gaza

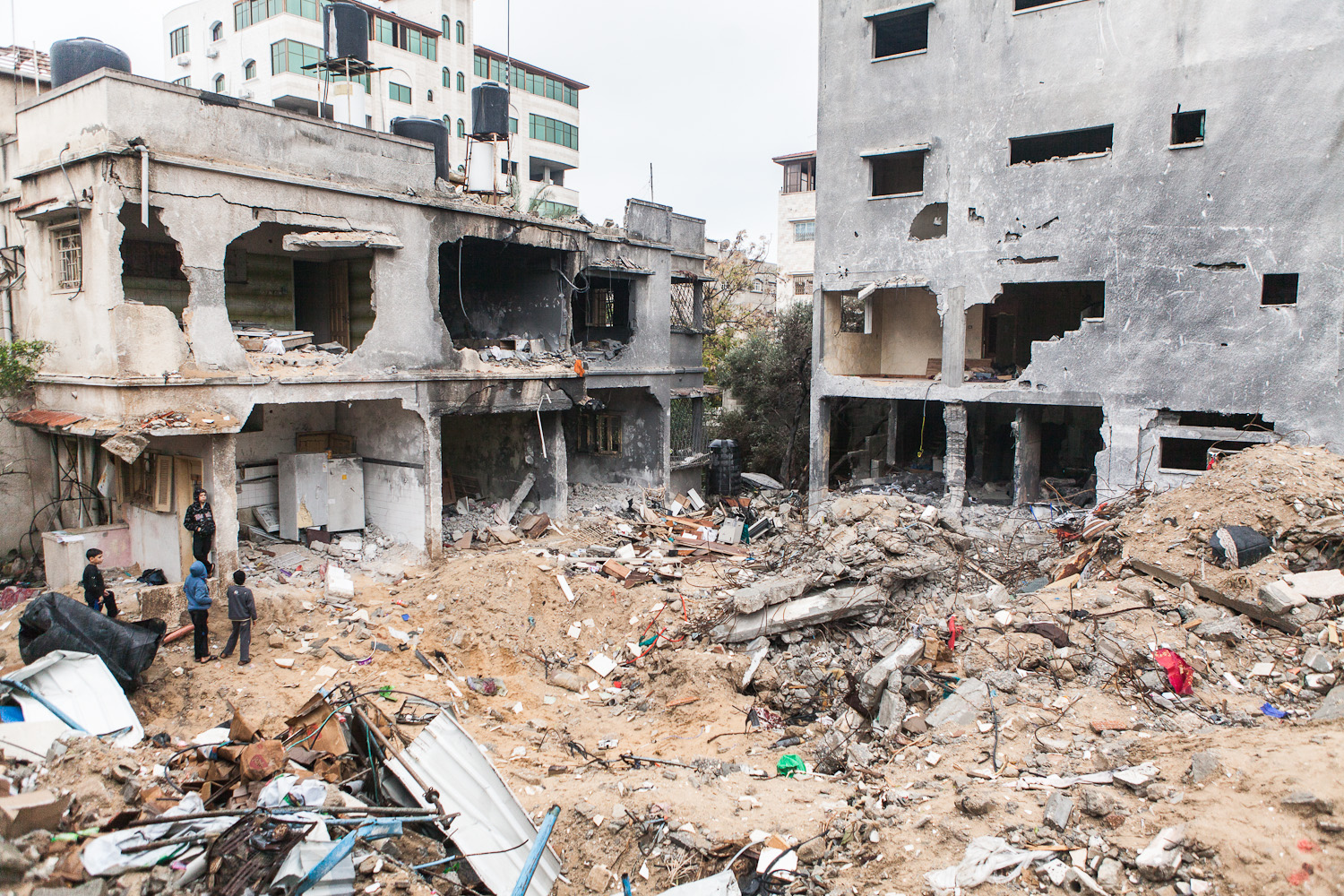
Al-Dalu family house, after Israeli attack

The Al-Dalu family killing occurred when twelve people were killed in an Israeli airstrike in the Gaza Strip on 18 November 2012, during the 2012 Gaza war. Ten members of the al-Dalu family were killed, including five children and an elderly woman, plus of two of the family's neighbors including another elderly woman. Several nearby houses were destroyed in the attack. At least nine civilians were hurt.

Mohammed Jamal al-Dalu, a member of a Gazan police unit charged with protecting important people, was one of those killed in the airstrike. The Israel Defense Forces initially said that he was the target of the raid.

== Israeli official statements ==
According to Mondoweiss, Israel gave four different versions about the strike target. On the day of strike the Israel Defense Forces (IDF) said that the head of Hamas' rocket unit Yahia Rabia was killed in the strike. The al-Dalu family said that they had never heard of a person of that name. A Haaretz investigation stated that the target, Yahia Rabia, lived in a neighbouring house, and that the IDF had mistakening bombed the Al-Dalu household. The IDF later corrected itself saying he is a high-ranking operative within the unit and was possibly not even hurt in the strike. IDF spokeswoman Avital Leibovich initially said the strike had been an accident, and that they had been targeting a man who had directing the launching of 200-300 rockets from that neighborhood. A Gaza source said that the target was apparently Jamal Mohammed Yassin Dalu, 50, an engineer, who is likely linked to the rocket unit. Human Rights Watch, who conducted an investigation over the strike, stated that Rabea's name was not listed as a killed fighter on the official websites belonging to the military wings of Hamas and Islamic Jihad who were killed during operations. A relative of the al-Dalu family, Hatem al-Dalu, said that he had never heard of Rabea and that Israel's explanation was "nonsense."

The IDF announced it was 'looking into' the incident. After a period of declining commentary on the deaths, on 27 November 2012, the Israeli army said that Mohammed Jamal al-Dalu, a 29 year-old member of the Gaza civil police who died in the attack was the target of the raid. IDF spokeswoman Avital Leibovich stated that "The father was a known terror operative affiliated with the military wing of Hamas." She added: "There was no mistake from the IDF. It's tragic when a terror operative is hiding among civilians but unfortunately it is part of Hamas and Islamic Jihad tactics." In an interview with Ma'an News Agency later retracted her statement.

Mohammed Jamal al-Dalu was the father of four of the children killed in the strike. Neighbors of the al-Dalu family said to reporters that there was no connection between the family and militant groups. Human Rights Watch has criticized the IDF for failing to provide information supporting its claims about Mohamed al-Dalu. According to the group, the IDF did not respond to its request for more information on the strike.

== Criticism of the airstrike ==
Sherine Tadros, the Al Jazeera correspondent to the Middle East who covered the conflict from Gaza, criticized the IDF policy of targeting the family homes of alleged militants on the grounds of the high civilian death toll that it can produce: "Does anyone stop and ask: even if there was a Hamas official inside the house, is killing ten innocent civilians to take out one official who is obviously under Israeli surveillance justified?"

During the engagement in Gaza, the IDF said that it fired warning shots over residential areas so as to allow civilians to flee their homes before Israel's air-strikes. Jamal al-Dalu, owner of the house, and patriarch of the killed family, said however that no warning shot had been given to allow his family to flee the area: "They didn't give us a warning. They just hit the house with the children in it. My daughters were in their youth. What did they do to them?"

The Palestinian Centre for Human Rights called the strike "an example of blatant targeting of civilians." Human Rights Watch called the strike disproportionate and a war crime, and has called for the family members of the victims to be compensated.

== Fatalities ==
The Dalu family fatalities were:

- Mohamed al-Dalu, 25
- Samah Abdul Hamid al-Dalu, 27
- Jamal Mohammed Jamal al-Dalu, 6
- Yousef Mohammed Jamal al-Dalu, 4
- Sarah Mohammed Jamal al-Dalu, 7
- Ibrahim Mohammed Jamal al-Dalu, 1
- Tahani Hassan al-Dalu, 52
- Suhaila Mahmoud al-Dalu, 73
- Raneen Jamal al-Dalu, 22.

The two neighbors killed were members of the al-Mauzannar family; they were:

- Ameena Matar al-Mauzannar, 75
- Abdullah Mohammed al-Muzannar, 19.

== See also ==
- Israeli war crimes
