= Timeline of the Gaza War (disambiguation) =

Timeline of the Gaza War may refer to:

- Timeline of the Gaza War (2008–2009)
- Timeline of the 2012 Gaza War
- Timeline of the 2014 Gaza War
- Timeline of the Gaza war, (2023–present)
