= 2012 Gaza War =

Military offensive in the Gaza strip

- Part of the Gaza–Israel conflict and the Israeli–Palestinian conflict
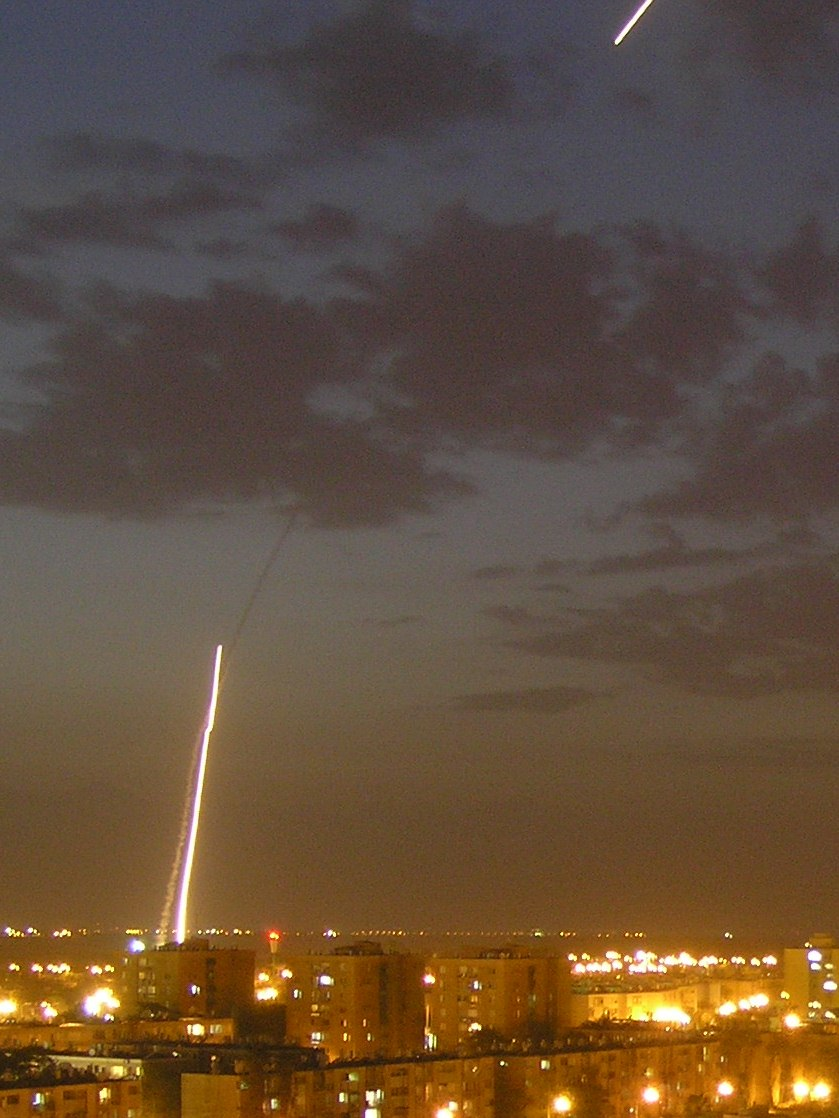
- Iron Dome launches during operation Pillar of Defense
Date	14–21 November 2012 (1 week)
Location	Gaza Strip and Israel 30°40′N 34°50′E
Result	Ceasefire, both sides claim victory: According to Israel, the operation "severely impaired Hamas's launching capabilities."; According to Hamas, their rocket strikes led to the ceasefire deal; Cessation of rocket fire from Gaza into Israel.; Gaza fishermen allowed 6 nmi (11 km) out to sea for fishing; reduced back to 3 nmi (6 km) after 22 March 2013

Belligerents
Israel	Gaza Strip; Hamas; Palestinian Islamic Jihad; Popular Front for the Liberation of Palestine–General Command; Popular Front for the Liberation of Palestine; Democratic Front for the Liberation of Palestine; Popular Resistance Committees; Al-Aqsa Martyrs' Brigades; Jaysh al-Ummah

Commanders and leaders
Benjamin Netanyahu; Prime Minister; Ehud Barak; Minister of Defense; Benny Gantz; Chief of General Staff; Amir Eshel; Air Force Commander; Yoram Cohen; Director of Israel Security Agency (Shin Bet)	Ismail Haniyeh (Prime Minister of the Hamas); Mohammed Deif (Commander of Izz ad-Din al-Qassam Brigades); Ahmed Jabari X (Deputy commander of Izz ad-Din al-Qassam Brigades); Ramadan Shallah (Secretary-General of Palestinian Islamic Jihad); Abu Jamal (spokesperson of the Abu Ali Mustafa Brigades)

Strength
Israeli Southern Command and up to 75,000 reservists	10,000 Izz ad-Din al-Qassam Brigades; 8,000 Al-Quds Brigades; Unknown for the rest 10,000 security forces.

Casualties and losses
Civilians: 4 killed, 219 injured Combatants: 2 killed, 20 wounded	Civilians: 105 killed, 971 wounded (Palestinian claim); 103 killed (UN preliminary estimate); 57-68 killed (Israeli and ITIC claim); 87 killed (B'Tselem claim); Combatants: 55 killed, 29 wounded 101–120 killed (Israeli claim); 55 killed (UN preliminary estimate); 62 killed (B'Tselem claim); 6 Palestinians killed for allegedly spying for Israel

In November 2012, the Israel Defense Forces (IDF) launched Operation Pillar of Defense (Hebrew: עַמּוּד עָנָן, ʿAmúd ʿAnán, literally: "Pillar of Cloud"), which was an eight-day campaign in the Hamas-governed Gaza Strip, beginning on 14 November 2012 with the killing of Ahmed Jabari, chief of the Gaza military wing of Hamas, by an Israeli airstrike.

The operation was preceded by a period with a number of mutual Israeli–Palestinian responsive attacks. According to the Israeli government, the operation began in response to the launch of over 100 rockets at Israel during a 24-hour period, an attack by Gaza militants on an Israeli military patrol jeep within Israeli borders, and an explosion caused by improvised explosive devices (IEDs), which occurred near Israeli soldiers, on the Israeli side of a tunnel passing under the Israeli West Bank barrier. The Israeli government stated that the aims of the operation were to halt rocket attacks against civilian targets originating from the Gaza Strip and to disrupt the capabilities of militant organizations. The Palestinians blamed the Israeli government for the upsurge in violence, accusing the IDF of attacks on Gazan civilians in the days leading up to the operation. They cited the blockade of the Gaza Strip and the occupation of West Bank, including East Jerusalem, as the reason for rocket attacks.

During the operation, the IDF claimed to have struck more than 1,500 sites in the Gaza Strip. According to a United Nations High Commissioner for Refugees (UNHCR) report, 174 Palestinians were killed and hundreds were wounded. Approximately 350–700 families were displaced. One airstrike killed ten members of the al-Dalu family. Some Palestinian casualties were caused by misfired Palestinian rockets landing inside the Gaza Strip. Eight Palestinians were executed by members of the Izz ad-Din al-Qassam Brigades for alleged collaboration with Israel.

During the operation, Hamas, the al-Qassam Brigades and the Palestinian Islamic Jihad (PIJ) further intensified their rocket attacks on Israeli cities and towns, in an operation code named Operation Stones of Baked Clay (Arabic: حجارة سجيل, ḥijārat sijīl) by the al-Qassam Brigades, firing over 1,456 rockets into Israel, and an additional 142 which fell inside Gaza itself. Some of these weapons were fired into Rishon LeZion, Beersheba, Ashdod, Ashkelon, and other population centers. Tel Aviv was hit for the first time since the 1991 Gulf War, and rockets were fired at Jerusalem. The rockets killed three Israeli civilians in a direct hit on a home in Kiryat Malachi. By the end of the operation, six Israelis had been killed, two hundred forty were injured, and more than two hundred had been treated for anxiety by Magen David Adom, an Israeli medical organization. About 421 rockets were intercepted by Israel's Iron Dome missile defense system, another 142 fell on Gaza itself, 875 fell in open areas, and 58 hit urban areas in Israel. A bus in Tel Aviv was bombed by an Arab-Israeli, injuring 28 civilians.

Canada, Germany, the United Kingdom, the United States, and other Western countries expressed support for what they considered Israel's right to defend itself, or condemned the Hamas rocket attacks on Israel. China, Iran, Russia, Egypt, Turkey, and several other Arab and Muslim countries condemned the Israeli operation. The United Nations Security Council held an emergency session on the situation, but did not reach a decision. After days of negotiations, a ceasefire mediated by Egypt was announced on 21 November. Both sides claimed victory. Israel said that it had achieved its aim of crippling Hamas's rocket-launching ability, while Hamas stated that Israel's option of invading Gaza had ended. According to Human Rights Watch, both sides violated the laws of war during the fighting.

== Etymology ==
Although the official English name of the operation is Pillar of Defense, the Hebrew name translates as Pillar of Cloud. This usage refers to the Pillar of Cloud in the Bible that protected the Israelites during the Exodus. The analogy is thus to the Israel Defense Forces, which shielded Israeli citizens from rocket attacks.

Hamas labelled its actions as "Operation Stones of Shale" (Qur'an 105:4).

== Background ==
In 2005, following the conclusion of the Second Intifada, Israel disengaged from the Gaza Strip, which it had previously occupied since 1967. The unilateral withdrawal plan began in August 2005 and was completed in September 2005. Nonetheless, the ICRC, the UN and various human rights organizations consider Israel still to be the de facto occupying power due to its control of Gaza's borders, air space and territorial waters.

In 2006, Hamas won a majority of seats in the Palestinian legislative elections. This outcome surprised Israel and the United States who had anticipated the return of the Fatah opposition to power and, together with the Quartet, they demanded Hamas accept all previous agreements, recognize Israel's right to exist, and renounce violence. When Hamas refused, stating that the demand left it "handcuffed", Israel cut off aid to the Palestinian Authority. In mid-2006, an Israeli soldier was captured by Hamas in a cross-border raid. The United States and Israel, in response to Fatah moves in October 2006 to form a unity government with Hamas, tried to undo the elections by arming and training Fatah to overthrow Hamas in Gaza. In June 2007, Hamas took complete power of Gaza by force.

Israel then defined Gaza as a "hostile territory" forming no part of a sovereign state and put Gaza under a comprehensive economic and political blockade, which also denied access to a third of its arable land and 85% of its fishing areas. It has led to considerable economic damage and humanitarian problems in Gaza. The overwhelming consensus of international institutions is that the blockade is a form of collective punishment and illegal. Israel maintains that the blockade is legal and necessary to limit Palestinian rocket attacks from the Gaza Strip on its cities and to prevent Hamas from obtaining other weapons.

In late December 2008, a series of escalations culminated in Israel launching aerial and naval attacks on Gaza and a few days later, a ground invasion. The conflict resulted in between 1,166 and 1,417 Palestinian and 13 Israeli deaths (4 from friendly fire), with significant damage to infrastructure in Gaza. It ended with a unilateral ceasefire by Israel, followed by Hamas declaring a one-week ceasefire.

The Palestinian-Israeli conflict in its current form dates to the split in the Palestinian Authority in 2006, which precipitated an armed conflict between Hamas and Fatah. By June 2007, Hamas] had taken over the Government in Gaza and ousted its rival Fatah. Following the takeover, Israel and Egypt largely sealed their border crossings with Gaza, making Gaza's economic and humanitarian position precarious. The International Committee of the Red Cross declared that Israel's blockade of Gaza constituted "collective punishment" and was a violation of international humanitarian law, and the UN Food and Agriculture Organization report on Gaza also concluded that the blockade was illegal. A UN Report of the Secretary-General's Panel of Inquiry described Israel's naval enforcement of the blockade as legal and appropriate. Israel withdrew its civilian and military personnel in 2005.

Tensions between Israel and the Hamas-governed Gaza Strip continued as the two sides experienced periodic fighting, which saw a major escalation in late 2008. Israel launched Operation Cast Lead in three weeks of air and ground assaults. The Israeli Ministry of Foreign Affairs stated that the action was a response to repeated rocket and mortars fire into Israel starting in December 2008, rising to 2,378 attacks over an eleven-month period leading to the operation. In the aftermath of the operation, there was a significant reduction in rocket and mortar fire from Gaza into Israel.

After the 2008–2009 escalation the two sides observed an informal and uneasy cease-fire, although rocket fire from Gaza never completely stopped and Israel conducted raids in Gaza. The IDF noted a steady increase in the number of rockets fired into southern Israel by militant groups in Gaza. By 2011, there were 680, and in 2012, 797 (through 13 November). Hamas demanded that Israel end the naval blockade of Gaza's coastline as a condition to end rocket fire. According to Israeli human rights group, B'Tselem, the Israeli security forces killed 273 Palestinians in the Gaza strip between the end of Operation Cast Lead and 30 October 2012, 113 of whom were civilians not taking part in hostilities.

According to Israeli security officials, Hamas, aided by Iranian technical experts and the Sudanese government, smuggled into Gaza Iranian-made Fajr-5 rockets with increased range and lethality. This move placed the highly populated Israeli central district and other metropolitan areas in range of rocket attacks. However, the commander of the Iranian Revolutionary Guards, Major General Mohammad Ali Jafari stated, "We haven't sent any weapons to Gaza because it is under blockade, but we are honoured to announce that we gave them the technology of how to make Fajr-5 missiles." Ali Larijani said Iran was "honored" to help Gaza's Hamas with "material and military aspects". According to Reuters, there were roughly 35,000 Palestinian militants in Gaza as of November 2012. Israel, which receives billions of dollars of military aid from the US, has a conscript army of 175,000, with 450,000 in reserve equipped with modern weapons systems including F-16 fighter-bombers, Apache helicopter gun ships, and Merkava tanks.

== Pre-operation events ==
Gaza Strip, with Israeli-controlled borders and limited fishing zone

Several factors acted to increase tensions between Israel and Hamas.

Israel restricted Gazan fishing due to concerns the fishing boats could be used for smuggling arms and other contraband. Palestinian Centre for Human Rights reported 92 Israeli attacks within the 3 miles zone against Palestinian fishermen in the first half of 2012 with 43 men arrested, 18 boats confiscated and 4 times equipment damaged and confiscated. Israel has imposed a limited fishing zone, limiting Gazan fishermen to fishing within three nautical miles instead of the twenty stipulated in the Oslo Accords. Fishery provides Gaza with a large share of its food production and provided more than 12,000 jobs. According to Amira Hass, the Israeli Navy routinely fire on Palestinian fishermen, sometimes detaining and transferring them for a minor interrogation at the Shin Bet security service's offices in Ashdod.

According to the Palestinian Centre for Human Rights, in July and August, 11 Israeli attacks took place and 2 fishermen were detained. One boat was confiscated. On 28 September 2012, Israeli soldiers entered the Gaza Strip and attacked a group of Palestinian fishermen who were fishing at the beach near the border, wounding one of them and mortally wounding his brother. The Israeli army said they had fired on two Palestinians who had entered a restricted zone near the security barrier. The family of the killed fisherman said that the fishers used to fish there and that the soldiers knew who they were and used to watch the Palestinian fishermen. In one of 11 other attacks in September, the Israeli Navy reportedly tried to drown two fishing boats. In October, PCHR documented 11 Israeli attacks against fishermen in which 8 fishermen were arrested while fishing approximately 2 miles off the shore. Two fishing boats and equipment were confiscated.

Also in October 2012, there were several mutual Israeli–Palestinian attacks, each a response to a previous response/attack by the other side. Palestinian farmers accused Israeli forces of opening fire on them and on local and international activists while they harvested olives near the border in the northern Gaza Strip. Israel said the army had no record of an attack in that area. Palestinian groups planted bombs alongside the border and attacked Israeli farmers with rockets. According to a summary by Shin Bet, 92 separate attacks occurred in October 2012, with 171 rockets and mortar shells fired against Israel. Gazan groups alleged retaliation against Israeli attacks that had killed or wounded civilians and militants alike.

An arms factory in Khartoum, Sudan, alleged to have participated in arms-smuggling to Hamas, exploded on 23 October 2012. The Israeli government refused to either confirm or deny its involvement, though the explosion was widely believed to be a long-range attack by the Israeli Air Force.

On 24 October, after a week in which dozens of rockets struck Israel and Israel conducted strikes against militant targets in Gaza, 80 rockets and mortars were fired from the Gaza Strip into southern Israel over a 24-hour period. Thirty-two missiles struck the Lachish region and 28 the western Negev. A rocket strike on the agricultural area of the Eshkol region severely wounded two Thai workers. Earlier that day three members of a Palestinian rocket-launching squad had been killed by airstrikes, and Israeli tanks had returned fire at launching sites in Gaza. Hamas promised to "continue carrying the rifle...until the liberation of Palestine and the defeat of the occupation." On 25 October, a ceasefire was allegedly negotiated by Egypt, but the existence of any truce was disputed both by Israeli and Palestinian officials. Although aggression continued in the following days, there were no more casualties on either side until 2 November.

On 2 November, a 22-year-old Palestinian who, according to the IDF, was suspected of attempting to place an explosive device on the Gaza-Israel border, was seriously wounded on Friday morning by Israeli tank fire. According to the IDF, he had been suspected of attempting to place an explosive device on the Gaza-Israel border. On 5 November, Israeli soldiers shot and killed a 20-year-old Palestinian man who approached a fence near Gaza's side of the border with Israel, reportedly ignoring warning shots and instructions to leave the area. Palestinians said that the man was unarmed, suffered from mental issues, and was constantly on medication. His relatives later said that he had approached the border before, and that at those times, Israeli soldiers used to take him back to Gazan authorities.

On 5 November, a Palestinian roadside bomb exploded and Israeli soldiers were injured. On 7 November, the armed wing of the Hamas movement and the Islamic Jihad group fired a volley of rockets at Israel, a day after an Israeli strike against targets in the Gaza Strip. In the Israeli strike, one Islamic Jihad fighter had been wounded, as well as four children at a suspected rocket launch area. It also damaged a mosque and a water tower. On 8 November, the IDF made a short-range incursion into Gaza after finding more bombs along the border, leading to a gunfight with the Popular Resistance Committees. During the clash, a 13-year-old Palestinian boy was killed. Palestinians claimed that his death occurred "by machine-gun fire, either from IDF helicopters or tanks that took part in the incident." Later that day, Palestinian militants detonated an explosives-packed tunnel they had dug on the border, wounding four Israeli soldiers. Hamas's military wing claimed responsibility for the blast, stating that it was in response to the killing of the boy.

According to Arutz Sheva, 2 Qassam rockets were fired into Israel on 9 November, exploding on open ground.

On 10 November, militants fired an anti-tank missile at an IDF Jeep on routine patrol near Israel's side of the border. Four soldiers were wounded, one of whom was in critical condition following the attack. The IDF shelled the source of the fire and pre-chosen targets in the Sa'ajiya area. Four teenagers, aged 16 to 18, were killed by an Israeli airstrike in a sports stadium while they played soccer. Gaza militants then fired at least 30 rockets and several mortar shells into southern Israel, The Color Red siren was sounded in Ashdod, Ashkelon, Gan Yavne, and surrounding areas causing Israelis within seven kilometers of the Gaza Strip to remain near protected areas. The Gan Yavne regional council canceled school because of the rocket barrage.

The sides continued to exchange fire for several days after the incident. Palestinian militants fired more than 100 rockets, striking homes in Israeli cities, one landing near a school. Several Israelis were wounded by shrapnel in a barrage designed to coincide with the morning commute to work. Two people were injured when their car sustained a direct hit. Schools across southern Israel were closed. The mayor of Beersheba, Ruvik Danilovich, explained, "We have experienced hits on our education institutions in the past ... 40,000 children will remain at home today because of the attack that hit us out of the blue." Israel carried out further airstrikes in Gaza. Six Palestinian militants were killed, including one militant belonging to the Palestinian Islamic Jihad.

In the days before the operation, Prime Minister Benjamin Netanyahu and Defense Minister Ehud Barak said that Israel's reaction would come "at the appropriate time." However, following a cabinet meeting in the morning before the operation, Minister Benny Begin said that "the current exchange of hostilities seems to be over." According to one Israeli analyst, these mixed messages, the expected diplomatic repercussions from Egypt and the risks of a war on the eve of the Israeli elections were three factors designed to foster a laissez-faire atmosphere for Gaza's Palestinian leaders.

On 12 November, Hamas and Palestinian Islamic Jihad (PIJ) officials indicated a willingness to discuss a ceasefire. A PIJ spokesman said, "The ball is in Israel's court. The resistance factions will observe Israel's behavior on the ground and will act accordingly." However, Palestinians fired 12 rockets at Israel throughout the day. A factory and a house were hit, and three civilians were wounded. Israel asked the UN Security Council to condemn the rocket attacks, with Minister Barak saying that Israel "would not accept the harm to daily life of our civilians."

Gershon Baskin, an Israeli peace activist who was a mediator between Israel and Hamas in the negotiations that resulted in the release of Gilad Shalit, reported that hours before the strike that killed Ahmed Jabari, Jabari had received a draft of a long-term ceasefire between Israel and Hamas. According to Reuven Pedatzur, the negotiations had been conducted with the consent of Ehud Barak, and a week before the strike IDF officials had asked to be briefed on their progress, but permission for the briefing was denied.

== Ceasefire ==
The two main parties, Israel and Hamas, refused to deal with each other directly. Instead, negotiations were conducted thorough intermediaries. Officials from the US and Egypt acted as the facilitators.

=== Attempts at ceasefire ===
Indirect negotiations between Israel and Hamas were mediated by Egypt. Egyptian president Mohamed Morsi predicted the negotiations would lead to positive results very soon. By contrast, US Secretary of State Hillary Clinton, after meeting with Netanyahu, said that the process would take place in the "days ahead." UN Secretary-General Ban Ki-moon also met with Netanyahu to attempt to end the violence. Turkish foreign ministers and Arab League diplomats were sent to Gaza to promote a truce between the warring parties.

According to reports in Cairo, Israel made six demands for a ceasefire:

1. No violence for a period of more than 15 years.
2. No smuggling or transfer of arms to Gaza.
3. End of all rocket fire and attacks on Israeli soldiers.
4. Israel reserves the right to attack terrorists in case of an attack or of a potential attack.
5. Israeli-Gaza crossings will remain closed (although Gaza-Egypt crossings may remain open)
6. Egypt's politicians must guarantee the above demands.

Hamas's demands for a ceasefire included the lifting of the naval blockade of Gaza, international community guarantees for the cessation of targeted killings, an end to IDF cross-border raids, and the cessation of attack. Hamas leader Khaled Meshaal additionally wanted "international guarantees" for the lifting of the blockade.

=== Ceasefire of 21 November ===
On 21 November, Mohamed Kamel Amr, the Egyptian Foreign Minister, and Hillary Clinton, the US Secretary of State, announced a ceasefire that would take effect at 21:00 GMT+2. The agreement distributed by the Egyptian presidency reads:

Understanding Regarding Ceasefire in Gaza Strip

1.a. Israel shall stop all hostilities in the Gaza Strip land, sea and air including incursions and targeting of individuals.
b. All Palestinian factions shall stop all hostilities from the Gaza Strip against Israel including rocket attacks, and all attacks along the border.
c. Opening the crossings and facilitating the movements of people and transfer of goods, and refraining from restricting residents' free movements, and targeting residents in border areas and procedures of implementation shall be dealt with after 24 hours from the start of the ceasefire.
d. Other matters as may be requested shall be addressed.
2. Implementation Mechanism:
a. Setting up the zero hour for the Ceasefire Understanding to enter into effect.
b. Egypt shall receive assurances from each party that the party commits to what was agreed upon.
c. Each party shall commit itself not to perform any acts that would breach this understanding. In case of any observations, Egypt – as the sponsor of this understanding – shall be informed to follow up.

— Authored and distributed by: Office of the Egyptian president

Khaled Mashal, the exiled leader of Hamas, thanked Egypt for mediating the ceasefire and claimed that Israel had been defeated. He also praised Iran for providing militants with financing and arms. Israeli Prime Minister Benjamin Netanyahu declared that Operation Pillar of Defense had been successful and thanked US President Obama for his "unwavering support for Israel's right to defend itself."

=== Post-ceasefire incidents ===
An explosion took place in Gaza in unclear circumstances after the ceasefire; no casualties were reported. A Palestinian man was killed and three others wounded by stray gunfire as gunmen in Gaza fired in the air to celebrate the ceasefire deal. In the hour after the ceasefire was declared, twelve rockets were launched from Gaza into Israel. All of them landed in open areas. Air raid sirens sounded in Eshkol, Sderot, Hof Ashkelon, Ashdod, Kiryat Malachi and Sha'ar Hanegev. One rocket over Ashdod was intercepted by the Iron Dome.

The day after the ceasefire Israeli soldiers shot dead a Palestinian farmer and wounded another 19. The survivors, who thought the terms of the truce allowed them access to their land, said they ventured into the Israeli-established "buffer zone" inside Gaza's border to pray, while climbing on the Israeli Defense Wall. The Palestinian ambassador to the UN, Riyad Mansour, complained to the organization that the attack was a violation of the ceasefire. On 28 November, Israel opened fire on two fishing boats off the coast of Gaza and detained nine Gazan fishermen. According to Mahfouth al-Kabriti, the head of Gaza's fishing association, the fishermen were six miles off the coast – the limit within which, as Israel agreed in the ceasefire deal, Gazan fishermen could sail. According to the Israeli Navy, the fishermen had ventured beyond the area designated as allowable for fishing, and did not heed requests to return to the area before being detained. On 30 November, another young Gazan man, 21-year-old Mahmoud Jaroun, was shot dead by Israeli forces in Rafah. According to Ma'an News Agency, Israeli forces had already violated the ceasefire several times by the beginning of December 2012 by firing at Palestinian farmers. On 1 December, Islamic Jihad warned that more "Israeli violations of a ceasefire deal" would move the group to respond.

== Spillover ==
=== West Bank ===
The conflict sparked widespread protests in the West Bank, leading to an upsurge in clashes between Palestinians and the IDF. On 14 November, two Israelis were lightly injured when their vehicle was stoned near Gush Etzion. The road from Jerusalem to Gush Etzion was closed as a result of fierce protests.

On 18 November, a 31-year-old Palestinian man participating in a demonstration in Nabi Salih was killed by Israeli fire. The IDF, which described the protest as "illegal and violent", launched an investigation into the incident. By 19 November, over 50 Palestinians had been reported injured during solidarity protests held in East Jerusalem, Ramallah, Bethlehem, Beit Ummar, and Qalandia.

On 19 November, thousands marched in response to the killing of a protester the previous day. An Israeli civilian vehicle was firebombed on Highway 60 in the West Bank. The passengers managed to flee before the vehicle was incinerated. According to Israel Hayom, a protester in Halhul who attempted to attack an Israeli soldier was shot and killed. Agence France-Presse (AFP) stated that the circumstances of the killing were unclear. The Palestinian police and ambulance service stated that no clashes had taken place where the man was killed. The IDF launched an investigation into the incident. Five firebombs were thrown at an Israeli Border Police base in Atarot. Assailants opened fire on Israeli soldiers at a military base near Jenin. Palestinians tried to infiltrate Nahliel by cutting through the security fence surrounding the Israeli town. Palestinians stoned Israeli vehicles on Route 443, a main highway connecting Tel Aviv and Jerusalem. A 22-year-old Palestinian in Hebron attempting to throw a firebomb at a soldier was shot and wounded. A Border Police officer was injured during a demonstration in Qalandiya.

On 20 November, an Israeli soldier was lightly wounded in clashes with Palestinian protesters near Gush Etzion, and an Israeli civilian woman was moderately injured in a stoning attack on a vehicle near Husan. Palestinian demonstrations throughout the West Bank that day praised the rocket strikes and called for a new uprising and the abandonment of diplomacy with Israel. According to The Christian Science Monitor, the demonstrations signaled a blow to the prestige of Palestinian President Mahmoud Abbas, who has supported talks with Israel.

Further protests and clashes occurred throughout the West Bank on 21–22 November. Thousands of Palestinians protested the death of Rushdi al-Tamimi, whose funeral procession passed through Ramallah and Birzeit University before ending in Tamimi's hometown of Nabi Salih. Several protesters attending the funeral lobbed stones at Israeli troops manning the entrance of the village, who responded with tear gas and rubber bullets. Hundreds of mourners attended the funeral of the Palestinian man killed in Hebron on 20 November. Following his burial many young protesters approached an Israeli settlement near Bab al-Zawiya Square, sparking clashes with Israeli forces who fired rubber bullets and tear gas. About 40 Palestinians were injured. In the city of Nablus, hundreds of protesters waved Hamas flags. The entrance to Bani Naim was closed by the IDF after clashes between them and the town's residents. Meanwhile, the northern West Bank village of al-Jalama was declared "a closed military zone" after hundreds of Palestinian demonstrators protested at the village checkpoint. Five Palestinians were arrested in house raids by the Israeli military in Ya'bad and Tubas. Israel alleged that the detained men had previously thrown stones at Israeli troops.

=== Other ===
On 14 November, the Egyptian military confirmed that four rockets had been fired from Sinai toward Israel by militant groups in an area with a history in the prior eighteen months of cross-border shootings and rocket launches.

On 20 November, a Lebanese army patrol discovered two ready-to-launch 107mm Grad rockets between the villages of Halta and Mari, about 2 miles from the Israeli border. The forces defused the rockets. IDF official Brigadier General Yoav Mordechai said Palestinian factions in Lebanon were probably behind the plot. (See: List of Lebanese rocket attacks on Israel.)

On 21 November, the day of the ceasefire, two rockets fired from Lebanon at Israel landed within Lebanon, according to Beirut officials. The next day, the Lebanese army disarmed an additional rocket aimed at Israel, this one in Marjayoun, about 10 kilometers from the border.

== Casualties ==
=== Israeli casualties ===
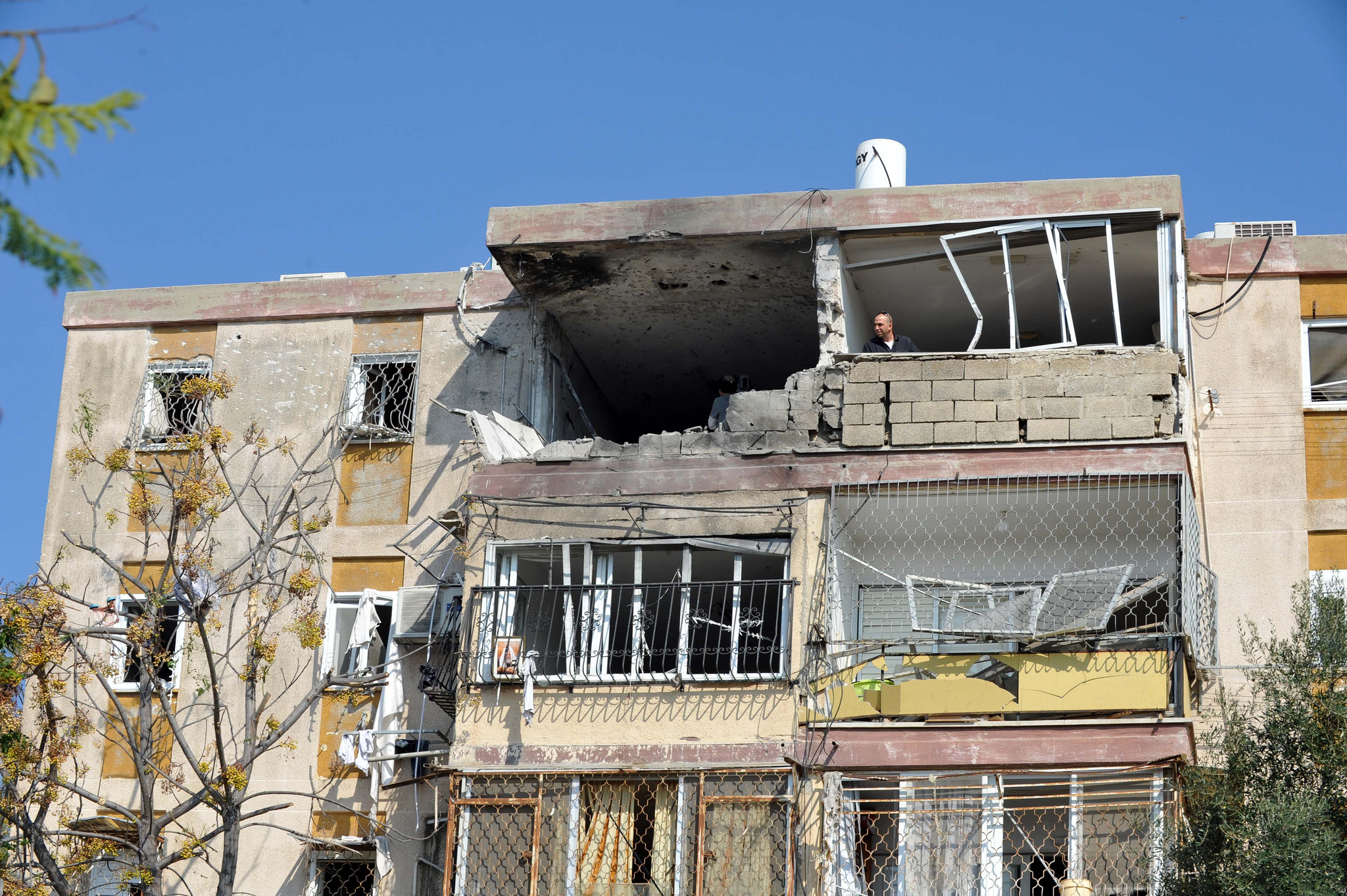
An Israeli apartment building in Kiryat Malakhi which was hit by a rocket, killing three residents

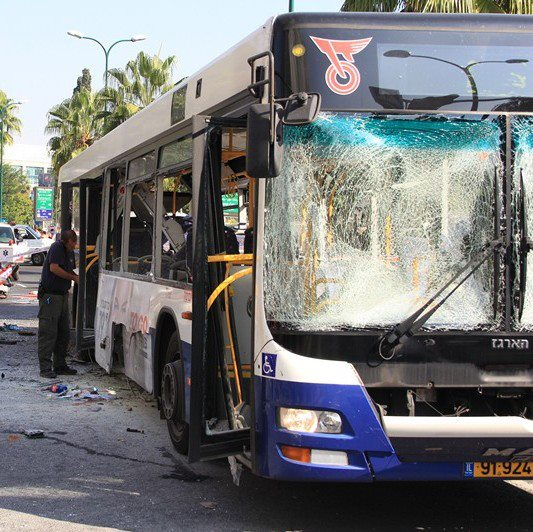
Aftermath of the Tel Aviv bus bombing incident on 21 November.

Four Israeli civilians and two soldiers were killed in Palestinian rocket attacks. Three of the civilians died in a direct hit on an apartment building in Kiryat Malakhi. The fourth Israeli civilian death was an Israeli-Arab contractor for the Israeli Defense Ministry who was killed in a rocket attack in the Eshkol Region. Both of the Israeli military fatalities were killed in rocket and mortar barrages on the Eshkol Regional Council. One of them was wounded on the last day of the conflict and died of his injuries on 22 November. By 20 November, almost 250 Israelis had been injured in rocket attacks, including at least 10 soldiers. Another 28 people were injured in a bus bombing in Tel Aviv.

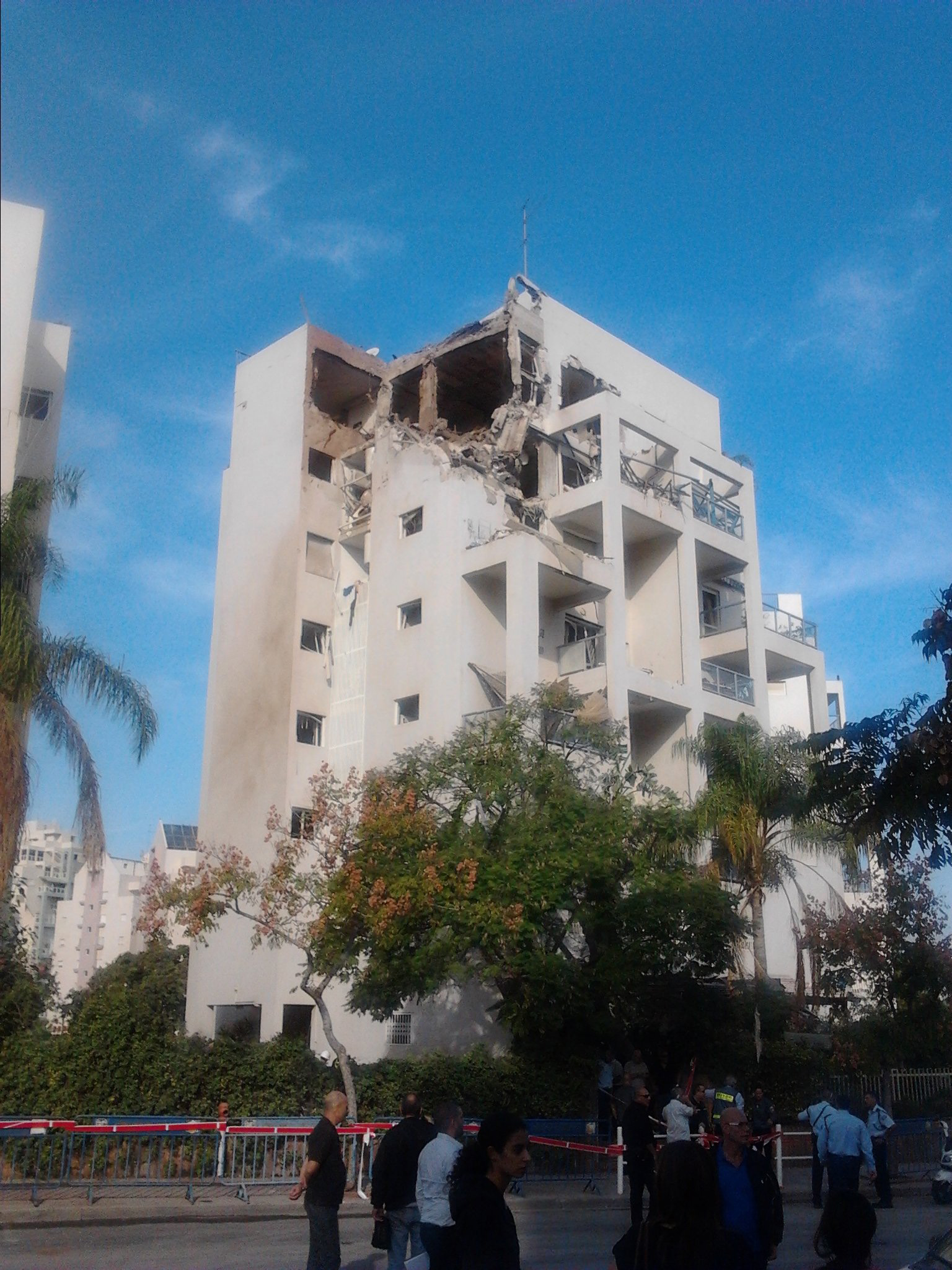
Building in Rishon le Zion hit by Hamas rocket

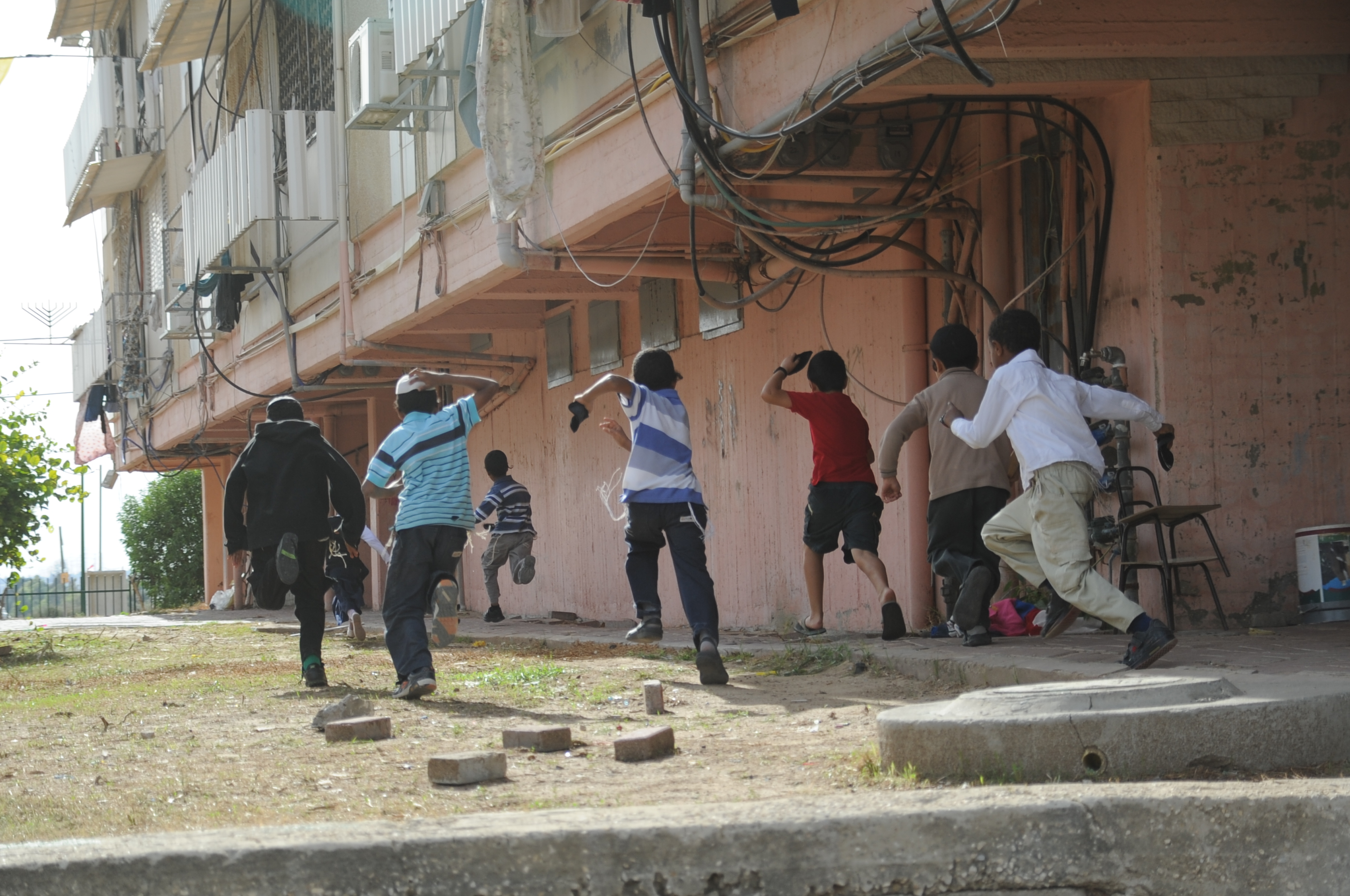
Israeli children running for shelter as an air-raid siren sounds.

The IDF credited the low Israeli casualty rate to a number of factors, both offensive and defensive: its preemptive targeting of launching pads and rocket arsenals, its ability to strike militants in the act of launching rockets, the 80%+ success rate of Israel's Iron Dome missile interception system, the existence of bomb-proof rooms in every Israeli house, the implementation of the Red Color alarm system, and public outreach efforts by its Home Front Command.

=== Palestinian casualties ===
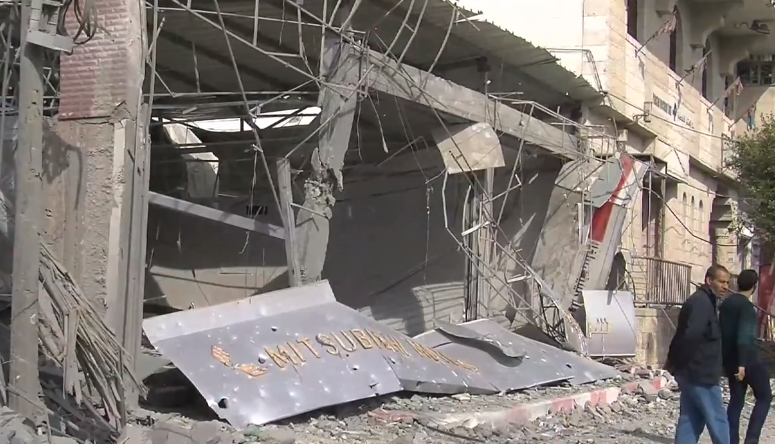
The damaged floor of a building in Gaza after Israeli strikes

In March 2013 the United Nations Human Rights Council issued a report stating 174 Palestinians in total died, 107 of them civilians. According to B'Tselem, 167 Palestinians were killed, including 62 Palestinians who took part in the hostilities and seven other who were targets of assassination. The Israel Defense Forces have stated that out of 177 Palestinians killed, 120 were militants, and that the IDF never deliberately targets civilians. Based on a large-scale survey, Al Mezan counted 129 civilians and 39 combatants killed. The Israeli air force says that it takes all possible measures to avoid harming Palestinian civilians, utilizing precision strikes and issuing preemptive warnings to Palestinian residents. The IDF alleges that it disseminated warning leaflets instructing civilians to avoid areas used by Hamas for firing rockets, and also phoned residents in warnings. It says targets were deliberately missed on the first strike to allow the non-combatants to vacate the area and missions were aborted because of a civilian presence.

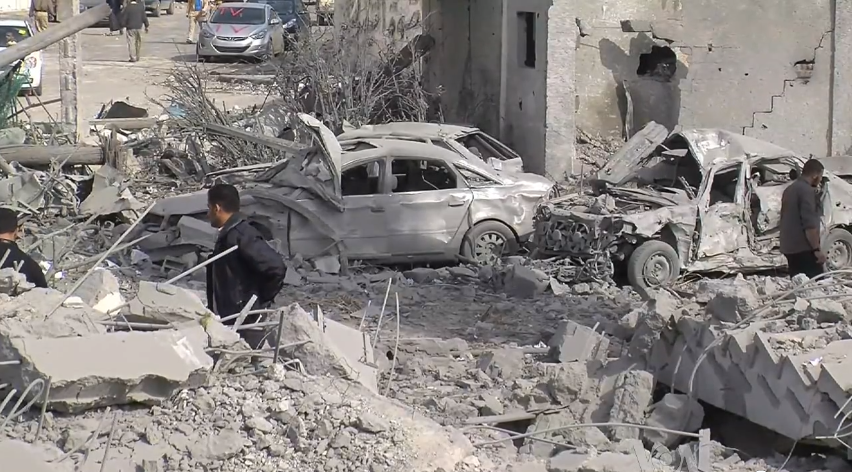
Debris in Gaza

On 19 November 2012, an Israeli airstrike killed ten members of the Dalu family, including five children as well as two neighbors, in the deadliest single strike of the entire operation. According to the UN, a relative said to be a member of the Izz al-Din al-Qassam Brigades was the target. Human Rights Watch stated it had found evidence on the ground in Gaza that supported the Israeli's claim that the suspected target, Mohammad Al-Dalou, was a member of Hamas' armed wing. A surviving family member denied that a warning had been given to his family to flee the home: "They didn't give us a warning. They just hit the house with the children in it. My daughters were in their youth. What did they do to them?". The IDF policy of targeting family homes of alleged militants has been criticized due to the high potential of creating civilian casualties. Competing theories for the attack were offered. One Israeli paper stated the IDF believed a militant was inside, while two others said the wrong house was targeted. IDF spokeswoman Avital Leibovich at first stated that the event was an accident and the target was a man, Yihia Abayah, supposedly responsible for launching 200–300 rockets into Israel. A relative of the family said that man is not known and rejected his existence. Later, the IDF changed justification for the attack to say that it was intentional and aimed at Mohamed al-Dalu, a Gazan police officer who died in the strike.

The most notable fatality of a Palestinian militant was that of Ahmed Jabari, a high-level commander in Hamas. The PCHR stated that the number of injured people had reached 1,000.

==== Combatants versus non-combatants ====
The media and combating parties, in counting the casualties, often use different definitions of "combatants" or "militants". The International Committee of the Red Cross regards persons as civilians if they do not fulfill a "continuous combat function" (for example, many police officers) or do not participate directly in hostilities. Civilians are entitled to protection and may not be the object of an attack. The fact that a person killed was a member of any particular Palestinian organization does not, in and of itself, prove that he took part in the hostilities or that he lost the protection given him as a civilian.

Some political or armed groups often declare killed persons, including children, one of their members and adopt them as "martyrs" placing their photographs on their websites and commending their contribution to resisting occupation. Their families may accept this for various reasons, including the willingness of armed groups to provide financial support to the families and pay for funeral costs of the persons killed. This does not mean that those persons killed were involved in militant activities in any way.

==== Public execution of alleged informants by Hamas ====
Seven Palestinians have been publicly executed by militants for alleged collaboration with Israel. One man, Ashraf Ouaida, was killed on 16 November near a mosque in the Sheikh Radwan neighborhood of Gaza City. An eyewitness said he saw two masked men emerge from a Jeep, drag the victim underneath a Hamas billboard and shoot him multiple times in the head, before hanging a poster citing his alleged crimes.

Militants shot six other Palestinians in the street on 20 November. According to witnesses, the men were pulled out of a van, forced to lie face down on the street and then shot dead. Five of the bodies were left in a pile while a mob stomped and spit on them. A sixth body was tied to a motorcycle and dragged through the main streets of Gaza City as onlookers screamed, "Spy! Spy!". Militants posted a sign naming the six victims. Hamas's radio station, Voice of al-Aqsa, quoted security sources, alleging that they "possessed hi-tech equipment and filming equipment to take footage of positions".

The man whose body was tied to a motorcycle, Ribhi Badawi, was a member of Jaljalat, an Islamist group that maintains a rivalry with Hamas. Badawi's family, neighbors, and friends maintained that the allegations of his having spied for Israel were "absurd", noting that he had spent the previous four years in a Hamas prison under armed guard. His widow stated that he confessed to aiding Israel after being tortured by Hamas for seven months with methods that included being burned, having his jaw and teeth broken, and being hung for 45 days by his arms and legs.

On 21 November, Hamas deputy leader Mousa Abu Marzook condemned the killings as "unlawful", adding that any punishments or executions must follow the legal process. He further added that those behind the killings must be punished.

==== Palestinian casualties from Palestinian fire ====
Some of the Palestinian civilian deaths are believed to have been caused by a Palestinian rocket that fell short of its target, not by Israel, and two were "high-profile" incidents. The UN report into the events by the High Commissioner for Human Rights found that of the 174 Palestinians killed, 168 were killed by Israeli military action, while 6 civilians may have been killed by Palestinian armed groups firing rockets from Gaza.

BBC Arabic photojournalist Jihad Masharawi lost his 11-month-old son and sister-in-law to what appeared to be an Israeli airstrike. Many international organizations condemned Israel for their deaths. Human Rights Watch reported that Israel was responsible for the deaths, based on "news reports and witnesses". The Palestinian Center for Human Rights stated that "an Israeli warplane fired a missile at a house belonging to Ali Nemer al-Mishrawi in the al-Zaytoun neighborhood in the east of Gaza City. Two members of the family (a woman and a toddler) were killed: Hiba Aadel Fadel al-Mishrawi, 19; and Omar Jihad al-Mishrawi, 11 months." The latest investigation by the U.N. Office of the High Commissioner for Human Rights suggested that the incident was most likely the result of an errant Palestinian rocket launched towards Israel, but fell back into Gaza. Two members of the family (a woman and a toddler) were initially killed: Hiba Aadel Fadel al-Mishrawi, 19; and Omar Jihad al-Mishrawi, 11 months." Ahmed al-Mishrawi, 18, later died from his injuries. According to Jihad al-Mishrawi, his residential neighborhood in the Sabra district saw no fighting before this incident.

The death of four-year-old Mohammed Sadallah after an explosion in Annazla appeared to have been the result of a misfiring home-made rocket, not a bomb dropped by Israel as originally alleged by Hamas. Hamas officials and relatives said that the four-year-old Gazan boy was killed in an Israeli airstrike on 16 November. Israel denied that it carried out any attacks in the area at the time. According to The New York Times, "the damage was nowhere near severe enough to have come from an Israeli F-16, raising the possibility that an errant missile fired by Palestinian militants was responsible for the deaths." Experts from the Palestinian Centre for Human Rights examined the site and opined that the explosion was caused by a Palestinian rocket; the boy's mother acknowledged that Palestinian militants might have been responsible. The Associated Press reported that "no one appeared to have witnessed the strike" and that "local security officials quickly took what remained of the projectile, making it impossible to verify who fired it." A United Nations Report released in March 2013 concluded that Sadallah "[was] killed by what appeared to be a Palestinian rocket that fell short of Israel" and not by an Israeli airstrike.

The UN reported that at least one other child and adult had also been killed by Hamas fire.

== Damage ==
Based on a large-scale survey by workers in the field, which Al Mezan claims to be extremely accurate, Al Mezan reported the total destruction of 124 houses located in all of the Gaza Strip, and partial damage of 2,050 homes. In just one week, the Israeli army destroyed numerous public and private premises, including 52 places of worship, 25 non-governmental organizations (NGOs), 97 schools, 15 health institutions, 14 journalist premises, 8 police stations, 16 government buildings, and 11 political sites. Fifteen factories and 192 trade shops were damaged or destroyed. Twelve water wells as well as agricultural lands were destroyed.

== Alleged war crimes ==
=== Hamas ===
==== Targeting of civilians ====
Both U.N. Secretary-General Ban Ki-moon and U.N. High Commissioner for Human Rights Navi Pillay condemned the continuing indiscriminate attacks and targeting of civilians in Israel by militants from Gaza.

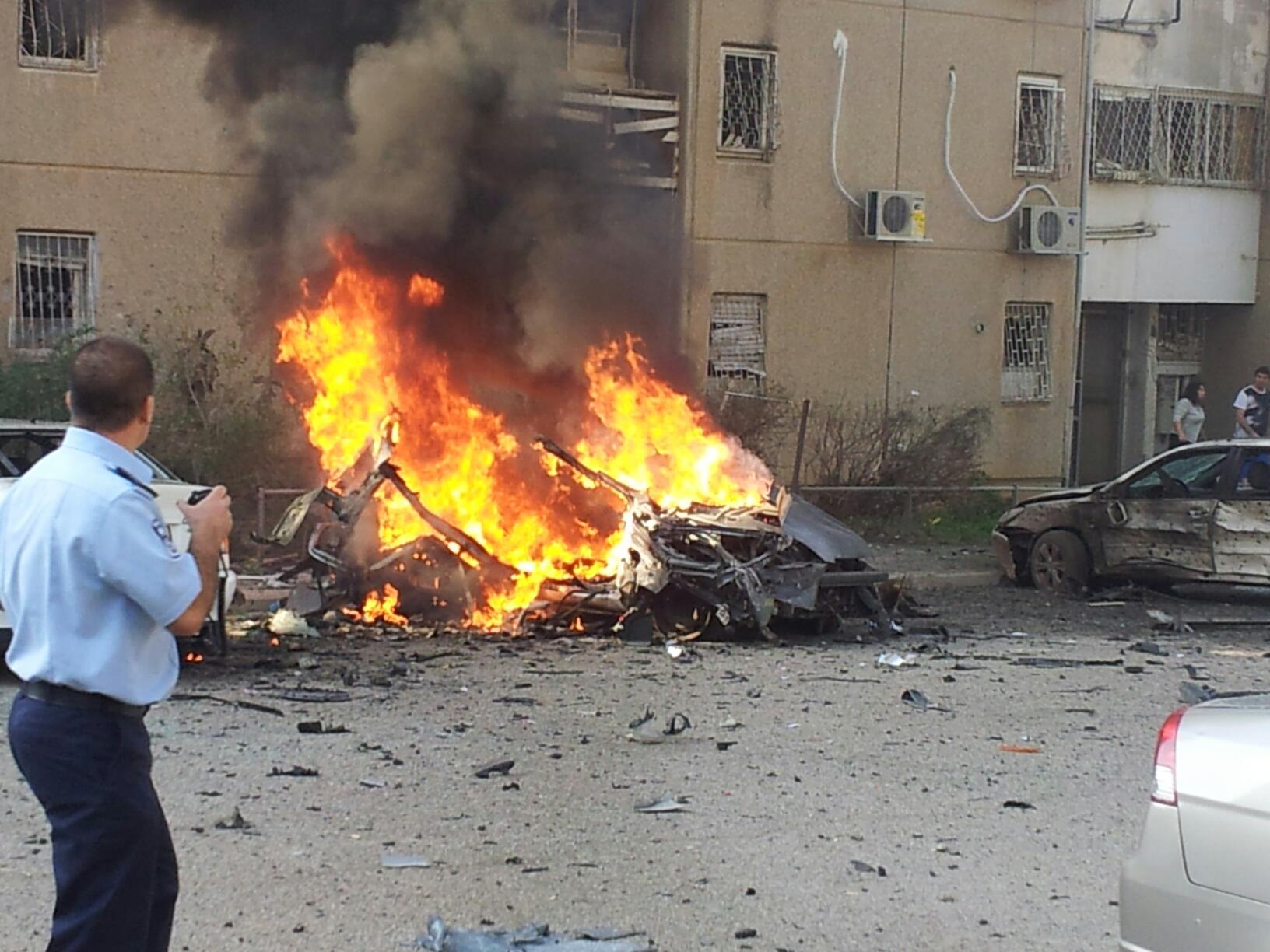
A burning car after a Grad rocket from Gaza hit it near a residential building in the city of Beersheba during Operation Pillar of Defense, November 2012.

Human Rights Watch stated that armed Palestinian groups fired hundreds of rockets at Israeli cities, violating international humanitarian law, and that statements by Palestinian groups that they deliberately targeted Israeli civilians demonstrated an "intent to commit war crimes." HRW's Middle East director Sarah Leah Whitson said that Palestinian groups made clear that "harming civilians was their aim" and said that the launching rockets at populated areas had no legal justification. International humanitarian law prohibits deliberate attacks on civilians, and intentional violations can be war crimes.

A report by the UN High Commissioner for Human Rights stated that "Palestinian armed groups continuously violated international humanitarian law, by launching indiscriminate attacks on Israel and by attacking civilians". The report further stated, "While some projectiles were directed at military objectives, many, if not the vast majority of the Palestinian attacks on Israel constituted indiscriminate attacks. Such attacks violate international humanitarian law. ... Most rockets fired by the armed groups did not seem to be directed at a specific military objective. Furthermore, many Palestinian armed groups directly and indirectly indicated their determination to – and took responsibility for – attacks on Israeli civilians or large population centres in Israel. Such acts clearly violate international humanitarian law."

==== Firing rockets from populated areas ====
Human Rights Watch stated that Palestinian groups endangered civilians by "repeatedly fir[ing] rockets from densely populated areas, near homes, businesses, and a hotel". Under international law, parties to a conflict may not place military targets in or near densely populated areas. One rocket was launched close to the Shawa and Housari Building, where various Palestinian and international media have offices; another was fired from the yard of a house near the Deira Hotel. Human Rights Watch said it had not been able to identify any instance where civilians had been warned to evacuate an area before a rocket launch by Palestinian militants.

Col. Richard Kemp, former Commander of British Forces in Afghanistan, said: "The use of the civilian population by Hamas is undoubtedly a war crime because not only are they hiding themselves under a civilian population, [but] they are also putting the civilian population at risk. In my view, if there are civilian casualties, the responsibility does not lie with the IDF, but with Hamas, who deliberately placed them there." Richard Landes criticised Hamas for firing from the midst of civilians, a practice leading to casualties blamed on Israeli counter-strikes to garner Western sympathy. Danny Ayalon said that Hamas's firing of rockets from built-up civilian areas was a "double war crime", noting that ten percent of them did not reach Israel.

The IDF stated that Hamas makes use of "human shield" tactics and said "By operating from densely populated areas, Hamas willingly endangers its own people, turning their houses and schools into terror sites and weapon depots." The Jerusalem Post and Fox News said Palestinian rocket launch-sites were put next to hospitals, schools, mosques, and playgrounds. On 21 November a long-range Qassam rocket, of the type Israel has accused Iran of supplying to Hamas, was fired from within 500 yards of the hospital and hit Gush Etzion, southeast of Jerusalem. An IDF spokesman stated they had released footage of "rocket fire from a mosque courtyard, prayer houses, public places and homes".

In March 2013, the UN Office of the High Commissioner for Human Rights (OHCHR) released a report criticizing Palestinian groups for launching rocket attacks from densely populated areas. The report stated that "The [Palestinian] armed groups failed to take all feasible precautions in attacks, in particular by launching rockets from populated areas, which put the population at grave risk."

==== Allegations that Islamic Jihad members were disguised as journalists ====
The IDF accused Gaza militants of abusing the protection afforded to journalists. On 20 November 2012 Muhammed Shamalah, commander of Hamas forces in southern Gaza and head of its militant training programs, was targeted by an Israeli air strike. At the time, he was driving a car which, according to the IDF, was clearly labeled "TV," indicating it to be a press vehicle.

The PCHR reported that an Israeli strike had killed al-Quds Radio journalist Muhammed Abu Eisha. The UN, The New York Times, Reporters without Borders, and Human Rights Watch condemned Israel for the attack. Frankfurter Allgemeine reported that PCHR failed to mention that Eisha was also a member of the Islamic Jihad and had participated in rocket attacks against Israel. Eisha's name and photo appeared on the Islamic Jihad's website at the time of his death.

==== Killing of alleged collaborators ====
The March 2013 report by the UN Office of the High Commissioner for Human Rights (OHCHR) criticized Palestinian militant groups for "summarily executing alleged Israeli spies in breach of humanitarian law".

=== Israel ===
==== Disproportionate force/Targeting of civilians ====
A report by the UN High Commissioner for Human Rights was harshly critical of the conduct of the Israeli army. The report stated that the IDF had "failed in many instances to respect international law", and that it did not "consistently uphold the basic principles of conduct of hostilities, namely, the principles of distinction, proportionality and precautions".

The Israeli airstrike that killed 12 civilians, including 10 members of the Al-Dalu family, has been called a "disproportionate" use of force and a war crime by Human Rights Watch, which stated that the attack had yet to be justified by Israel, and called for the perpetrators of the strike to be punished and the surviving members of victims' families to be compensated. Palestinian Center for Human Rights condemned it as "an example of blatant targeting of civilians". According to The New York Times, "political leaders and human rights advocates have called the [Dalu family] deaths a massacre and a war crime."

British MP Gerald Kaufman criticized the Israeli offensive, and its broader context — of occupation of the West Bank and the siege of Gaza — as war crimes. In an emergency meeting of the Arab League, foreign ministers of member-states accused Israel of perpetrating war crimes and crimes against humanity.

Turkey and Iran accused Israel of committing war crimes and refused to consider the Israeli airstrikes self-defense. Turkish PM Recep Tayyip Erdogan accused Israel of committing "ethnic cleansing" of Palestinians.

==== Bombing of media facilities ====
In four Israeli attacks on media facilities and journalists, ten media workers were wounded, and two cameramen and a two-year-old was killed.

The Israeli government stated that each of the attacks were on a legitimate military target. The Israeli army stated that foreign journalists were used as human shields by Hamas, after attacks on two media centers in Gaza containing Hamas communications devices.

Human Rights Watch conducted an investigation into these incidents and concluded that "there were no indications that these targets were valid military objectives." and thus "violated the laws of war by targeting civilians and civilian objects that were making no apparent contribution to Palestinian military operations". HRW further stated that journalists and civilian broadcasting facilities were not legitimate military targets simply because they broadcast pro-Hamas or anti-Israel propaganda.

In one separate incident, according to the IDF, it hit four Islamic Jihad militants hiding out in a media center in Gaza, the Al-Sharouk compound. PIJ reported by text message that one of their senior militant operatives, Ramez Harb, was killed in the airstrike. as well as Palestinian cameramen. Israel warned the foreign journalists to leave the building before the strike. One foreign journalist that worked there spoke of his anger that the building was being used as a hideout by Palestinian militants, endangering many people. Human Rights Watch said this attack appeared to be on a military target, and that if Palestinians conducting military operations were present, they were violating international law by placing civilians at unnecessary risk.

The Israeli military's alleged targeting of journalists was also condemned by Reporters without Borders. Christophe Deloire, secretary-general of RWB, said "Even if the targeted media support Hamas, this does not in any way legitimize the attacks. ... Attacks on civilian targets are war crimes and serious violations of the Geneva Conventions. Those responsible must be identified." Writing for The New York Times, David Carr noted that IDF spokeswoman Avital Leibovich, who said that the journalists were "people who have relevance to terror activity", did not identify the strike as a mistake. Carr accused Israel of deliberately targeting journalists under the cover of war, using "amorphous" phrases such as "relevance to terror activity" to justify the attacks.

NGO Monitor stated that Hamas in Gaza "terrorizes the international press" because it put its own operational communication antennas on top of buildings whose lower floors house foreign media outlets.

== Social media and Internet ==
The military wing of Hamas and the Israeli military both made use of Twitter.

The IDF made widespread use of Twitter and a liveblog to give an up-to-date account of its operations. The military wing of Hamas also made use of Twitter, publicising its rocket and mortar attacks and tweeting when Israeli casualties were reported. Foreign Policy magazine labeled this effort a "milestone in military communications." Twitter had previously been used to present information regarding military engagements by both the Kenya Defence Forces and Al Shabaab during the KDF's operation against Al Shabaab in Somalia in 2011. The IDF's Twitter account gained more than 50,000 new followers in 24 hours.

An app based on an idea provided by a 13-year-old was developed to supply up-to-date reports of imminent missile attacks and send information of the location and timing of the public "Color Red" alerts. The app allowed users extra time to run to bomb shelters.

Hamas produced a video that threatened the lives of Israeli citizens and warned, "Wait soon for us in the bus stops and cafes." The video became a popular target for parody because of its technical problems and the broken Hebrew written and spoken in it.

During the campaign, pro-Palestinian hackers launched a concerted effort to cripple Israeli websites. Israeli websites faced over 60 million hacking attempts, which failed to cause any significant damage. In April 2013 Anonymous attacked many Israeli websites in response to the IDF offensive in Gaza. They called the attack #OpIsrael and claimed to have taken down at least 700 sites as of 18 November 2012. The Israeli Defense Forces claimed to have deflected 44 million cyber attacks by that date. Many of the websites were replaced with messages condemning the Israeli campaign and expressing support for the citizens of Gaza. Hackers from Kuwait disrupted the website of Likud MK Danny Danon, who had posted an online petition urging the government of Israel to cease providing the Gaza Strip with electricity. The Facebook and Twitter accounts of Israeli Vice Prime Minister and Likud MK Silvan Shalom were hacked by a pro-Palestinian group called ZCompanyHackingCrew.

=== Criticism of IDF media campaign ===
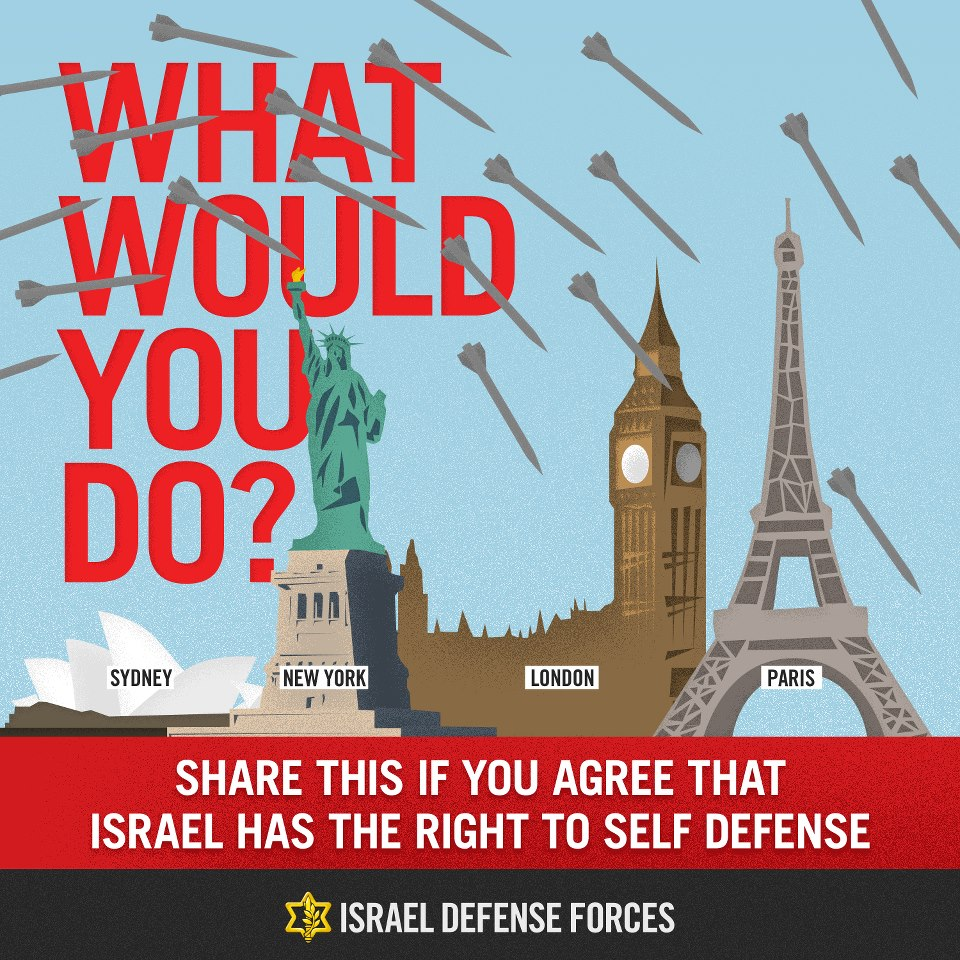
"What Would You Do" IDF graphic.

The IDF's blog incorporates gamification features where visitors are awarded points and given badges for things such as visiting the blog or sharing its contents on their social networks. Although the blog had had these features previously, they had been disabled before Operation Pillar of Defense due to "high traffic." They were re-enabled shortly after the operation began. Multiple commentators have described the timing of their re-enablement just after the launch of Operation Pillar of Defense as offensive. ReadWrite's Jon Mitchell described it as "absolutely horrendous", and The Atlantic's Jeffrey Goldberg called it "disgraceful."

Israel's social media campaign around Operation Pillar of Defense has been perceived by some parties as overly aggressive or otherwise inappropriate. Wired described Israel's efforts as "hyper-pugnacious," and Foreign Policy's Michael Koplow expressed fears that Israel's social media campaign might contribute to some people's "fear of Israel run amok with no regard for the collateral damage being caused."

=== Allegations of Hamas disinformation ===
Hamas attempted to conduct "psychological warfare" consisting primarily of fake emails and Facebook postings. Many Israelis received a false announcement from an "IDF Spokesman" warning that "terrorists in Gaza can track you and direct their Katyushas to your location!" if they opened their text messages. Thousands received emails in broken Hebrew that "the military censorship of military intelligence" was concealing information about attacks on soldiers and urged them to view the "picture of the field of death in which our soldiers are falling in Gaza." The attached YouTube videos, though claiming to show an IDF jeep struck by a missile, was in fact a vehicle of the Reuters news agency that had been hit on the border.

Hamas warned Gazan civilians against spreading unsourced information, claiming that such behavior harmed national security and aided Israel's "psychological war". The Interior Ministry said that it would convey any "needed information" in order to "safeguard the truth." The statement came after Hamas gunmen publicly shot a Gaza resident multiple times in the head for allegedly collaborating with Israeli authorities. Richard Landes, a blogger and American Associate Professor of history at Boston University, accused Hamas of "brazen hypocrisy" and exploiting a death they had caused in order to garner Western sympathy.

Hamas fabricated achievements and used pictures of children injured or killed in Syria, presenting them in the social media as Palestinian dead. One of its tweets about the Israeli strikes contained a picture of a dead girl, previously posted on the "Syrians & Friends" Facebook page in October 2012. Another photo of explosions that was uploaded to the Facebook page affiliated with Hamas appeared to be digitally altered. Hamas staged several fake deaths and scenes of injury in front of TV crews.

Some argued that Hamas' manipulation effectively undermined their own cause, as readers could not be certain of the authenticity of what they were seeing.

== Media coverage ==
Noam Chomsky, Seumas Milne, Glenn Greenwald, John Mearsheimer, Paul Pillar, and several other writers have blamed Israel for the conflict. Former British commander, Richard Kemp, by contrast, said there was a "very effective anti-Israel propaganda machine" that misunderstands what he considers the reality that Hamas is a terrorist organization.

Sharine Tadros, an Al Jazeera correspondent to the Middle East who covers the conflict from Gaza, criticized several aspects of the media approach to the conflict. Tadros criticized what she said was an uncritical and repetitive use by journalists of Israel's justifications for targeting homes and other civilian structures. Tadros further criticized the use of terms such as "Hamas school". According to her, "Hamas" is used as an adjective by Israel as justification for targeting civilian infrastructure.

=== Images ===
The Arab news site Alarab Net released a photo on 18 November which depicted three bloodied children and their mother lying on a floor, who were allegedly massacred in Gaza. Inciting a flurry of comments on Facebook, they turned out to be Syrian massacre photos from 19 October reused to depict a "Gaza tragedy".

On 19 November, BBC Gaza correspondent Jon Donnison retweeted a photograph of a dead or injured child titled "Pain in Gaza", with his own comment "heartbreaking". It was soon shown that the photo was apparently taken in Syria and is dated to 28 October 2012, before the beginning of the events in Gaza. Donnison apologized for the incident.

Pro-Palestinian activists co-opted another photograph on Twitter, identifying an injured infant held by a rescue worker as a "young injured Palestinian child". However, Facebook and Twitter users recognized it as that of an Israeli baby wounded by a Hamas rocket attack; "Kiryat Malachi" was printed on the rescue worker's vest.

Photographs of a distraught Palestinian man, Jihad al-Masharawi, a BBC journalist, carrying the body of his 11-month-old son, Omar, wrapped in a white shroud were printed in newspapers worldwide and widely distributed on social media. Masharawi, the BBC Middle East bureau chief, and at least two human rights organizations initially blamed Israel for the incident, and the infant's death quickly became a powerful symbol of the conflict. However, in March 2013, the report of the Office of the United Nations High Commissioner for Human Rights on the eight-day conflict stated that Omar was most likely the victim of "what appeared to be a Palestinian rocket that fell short of Israel."

=== Video ===
HonestReporting, a pro-Israel media monitoring organization, accused BBC News of broadcasting footage of an injured Palestinian man who was later shown walking around, calling it a case of "Pallywood". A BBC spokesperson said in response, "The footage shown by BBC News was edited from a longer sequence provided by the Reuters news agency in which the man in question is shown being lifted from the ground. He is then given attention at the roadside, before appearing later having recovered. Steps have been taken to ensure any re-broadcast reflects the full sequence so that is absolutely clear to our audience."

The United Nations Relief and Works Agency for Palestine Refugees in the Near East (UNRWA) expressed concern for the use of footage by the IDF which suggested the agency's complicity in "terrorist activities" targeting Israel.

== See also ==
- Timeline of the Israel–Gaza conflict
- Roof knocking
