= Ramez Harb =

Palestinian militant and commander

Ramez
- Died: 19 November 2012; Gaza City

Ramez Harb (died 19 November 2012) was a Palestinian militant and commander. He was the second high commander killed in the Israeli offensive in mid-November 2012.

== Militant activities and death ==
Harb was in charge of propaganda in Islamic Jihad's Gaza City Brigade and an aide to Tissir Jabari. He was killed in an Israel Air Force strike on a high-rise building in Gaza City on 19 November 2012 during the Operation Pillar of Cloud.
