= 2012 Tel Aviv bus bombing =

2012 terror attack in Tel Aviv, Israel

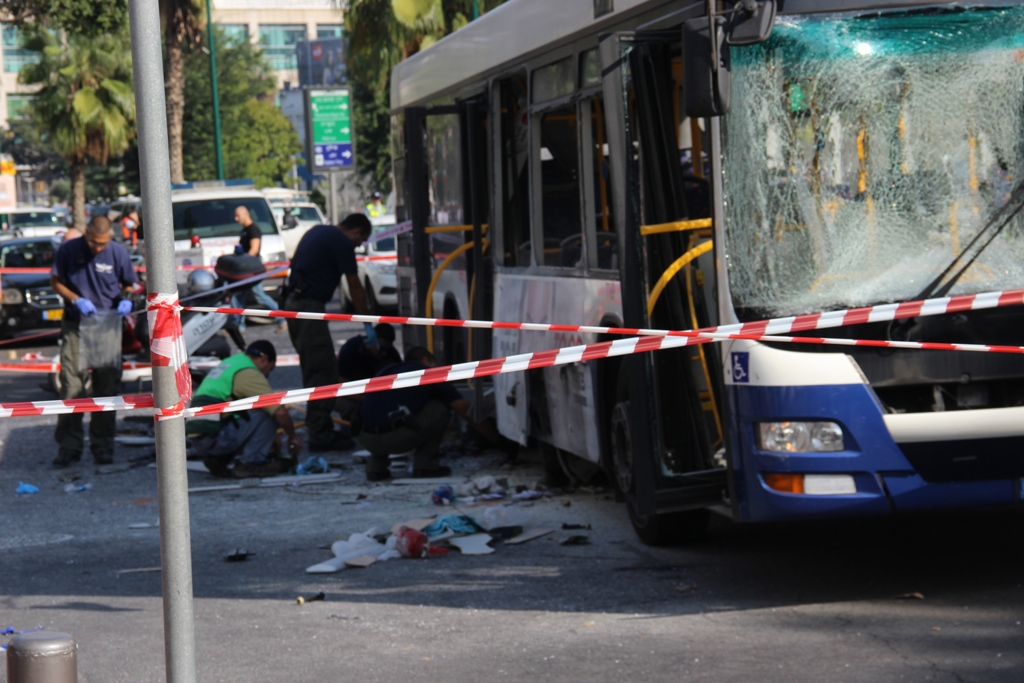
- The attack aftermath

- The attack site
- Native name: הפיגוע בקו 142 בתל אביב (2012)
- Location: 32°04′40″N 34°47′29″E; Tel Aviv, Israel
- Date: November 21, 2012; 13 years ago c. 12:00 pm
- Attack type: Bus bombing
- Injuries: 28 civilians
- Perpetrator: Israeli Arab working with West Bank militant cell

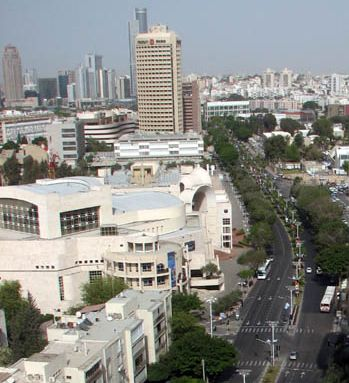
Shaul Hamelech Street, the location of the attack, pictured in 2009

The 2012 Tel Aviv bus bombing was a mass-injury terror attack carried out on November 21, 2012, on a crowded passenger bus driving in the center of Tel Aviv's business district. The attack was carried out by an Israeli citizen of Arab descent, who remotely detonated an explosive device, which he had hid on the bus in advance. Twenty-eight civilians were injured in the attack, among them three who were injured seriously. The attack was carried out on the 8th and last day of Operation Pillar of Defense, only a few hours before the ceasefire was reached.

The attack was the first mass-injury terror attack in Tel Aviv since the 2006 Tel Aviv shawarma restaurant bombing, in which 11 people were killed and 70 were injured.

== Attack ==
At around noon, on November 21, an explosive device was detonated on a crowded passenger bus at the heart of Tel Aviv's business district. The attack was carried out on Dan commuter bus No. 142, as the bus was passing through Shaul Hamelech Street.

The explosive device contained a large quantity of metal shrapnel designed to cause maximum casualties. At least 28 people were injured in the attack, including three people who were injured severely.

At Gaza's main hospital, which had seen many wounded people from Operation Pillar of Cloud, sweet cakes were distributed in celebration. The bus bombing was lauded from a Gaza mosque's loudspeakers and celebratory gunfire was heard when news of the bombing was reported.

== Perpetrators ==
Two days after the attack, in a joint operation carried out by the Shin Bet, the Israel Police, and the IDF, Muhammad Mafarji, 18, of Tayibe, a West Bank-born Palestinian originally from Beit Liqya who had received Israeli citizenship for family reunification purposes, was arrested. Mafarji confessed to carrying out the attack and to having prepared the explosive device, chosen the target of the attack, and purchased a mobile phone which he used to remotely activate the explosive device.

According to Israeli security officials, Mafarji was a member of a Palestinian militant cell based in the West Bank town of Beit Liqya, which has links to Hamas and Islamic Jihad. Khaled Mashal, leader of Hamas, categorically rejected that Hamas had any connection with the bombing.

According to papers filed in court, the suspects include Ahmad Salah Ahmad Musa, a 25-year-old resident of Beit Liqya; Fuad Rabah Shukri Atzi, 27, of Beit Liqya; and Muhammed Mahfud Said Damra, a 25-year-old resident of Kfar Mazra near Ramallah. Musa was reported as being the head of the militant cell. According to investigators, Mafaraji had returned to the West Bank to study at Birzeit University, and in the two months prior to the attack, he had been living at his uncle's house in Beit Liqya studying at Birzeit and regularly commuting to Israel to work at the McDonald's at a mall in the Israeli city of Modi'in-Maccabim-Re'ut, close to the Israel-West Bank border. According to Israeli officials, during the sixth day of Operation Pillar of Defense, Mafaraji was shopping at a West Bank grocery store owned by Musa, and expressed his desire to fight alongside Hamas. Musa then asked him to return later to discuss the matter further. When he returned, Musa asked him to place a bag on a bus as a test run, which he successfully completed. The two then began planning an attack. Moussa prepared a bomb that could be detonated by cell phone and hid it in a bag of clothes, then took Mafaraji to the Harbata checkpoint, where he crossed into Israel to meet with the manager of the McDonald's where he worked. As the manager was driving him to his job, Mafaraji faked a phone call and claimed to have learned that his mother was ill, and that he needed to go back to her. After leaving the vehicle, he took a bus to Tel Aviv, where he boarded the No. 142 bus, armed the bomb, and planted it under a seat. When the bus reached the planned destination point, Mafaraji got off and called Musa to tell him the bomb was in place, at which point Musa detonated the bomb with his cell phone. Mafaraji then walked to the Tel Aviv Savidor Central Railway Station, took a train to Modi'in, and went to the McDonald's where he worked to begin his afternoon shift. He was arrested four and a half hours after the attack.

On December 19, 2012, Muhammad Mafaraji was charged in the Tel Aviv District Court with attempted murder, aiding the enemy during wartime, and conspiracy to commit a crime. The most serious charge of aiding the enemy carried the possibility of a life sentence. In December 2013, he reached a plea bargain with prosecutors, under which he pleaded guilty to attempted murder and aiding the enemy in exchange for the prosecution not seeking a sentence greater than 25 years. On March 10, 2014, he was sentenced to 25 years in prison.

== Official reactions ==
Domestic

Israel:

- Ofir Gendelman, a spokesman for the Israeli Prime Minister's Office, condemned the attack and referred to it as a "terrorist attack".

Palestine: Hamas praised the attack, without claiming direct responsibility for it, calling it the "natural response to the occupation crimes and ongoing massacres against civilians in the Gaza Strip", and said that the organisation "blesses" the attack. Khaled Mashal, leader of Hamas, categorically rejected any connection of the bombing to his group.

Supranational bodies

- United Nations Secretary-General Ban Ki-moon deplored the attack, saying that nothing justified the targeting of civilians.

International

- Russia: The Russian foreign ministry termed the bombing a "criminal terrorist act".
- France: The French Foreign Minister similarly condemned the bombing, adding that it took place during efforts to secure a ceasefire.
- Romania: The Romanian Foreign Minister condemned the bombing, adding his solidarity with Israel.
- United Kingdom: Britain's Foreign Secretary said following the attack that "we are clear that terrorists must not be allowed to set the agenda."
- United States: The White House called the bombing a terrorist attack against innocent Israeli civilians, and deemed it "outrageous".

== Aftermath ==
On October 22, 2013, Shin Bet announced that Mohammed Assi, an Islamic Jihad member, died in a firefight in Bilin with forces that had come to arrest him on suspicion of his involvement in the bombing.
