= Avital Leibovich =

Israeli soldier and activist

Avital Leibovich אביטל ליבוביץ
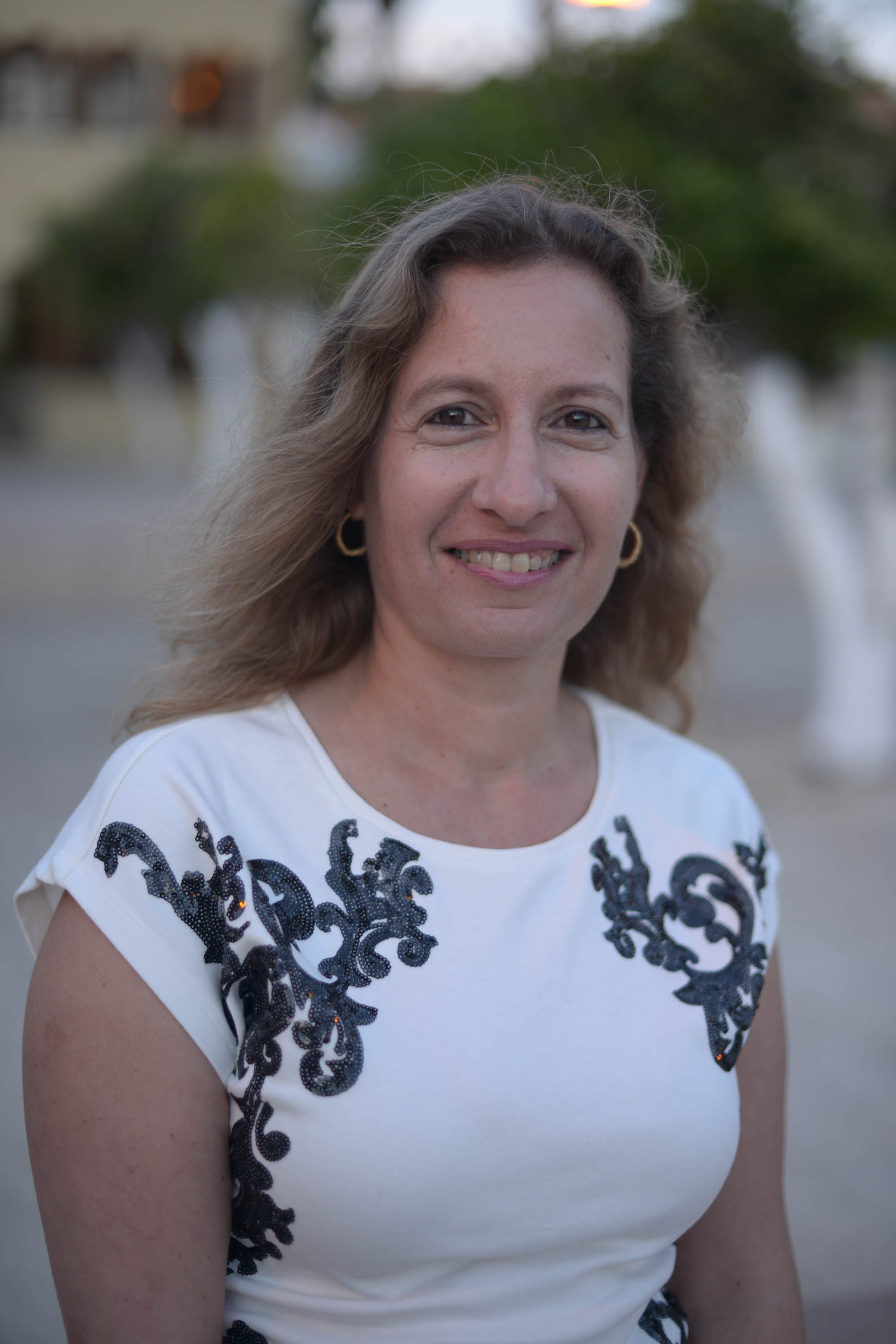
- Avital Leibovich, 2017
- Born: October 18, 1971 (age 54); Tel Aviv, Israel
- Military career
- Allegiance: Israel
- Branch: Israel Defense Forces
- Service years: 1989 – March 31, 2014 (Entered IDF Reserves)
- Rank: Sgan Aluf
- Unit: IDF Spokesperson's Unit
- Commands: IDF Spokesperson's Unit Interactive Media Branch
- Conflicts: First Intifada, Second Intifada, 2006 Lebanon War, Operation Cast Lead, Operation Pillar of Defense
- Other work: Director of AJC Israel - Middle East Headquarters Lecturer at the Interdisciplinary Center Herzliya

Avital Leibovich (Hebrew: אביטל ליבוביץ) is the Director of the American Jewish Committee (AJC) in Israel.

== Education ==
Leibovich graduated with a BA in English Literature and Political Science from Bar Ilan University in 1992, and received a MA in International Relations from University of Haifa in 1998; she also received a diploma in Spokesmanship, Communications, and Public Relations from the Department of Foreign Affairs at Bar Ilan University in 2002.

== Career prior to AJC ==
Leibovich served for 22 years in the Israel Defense Forces, achieving the rank of lieutenant colonel, and holding a wide range of senior media and public relations positions within the IDF.

Her most recent role was Head of the Interactive Media Branch of the IDF Spokesperson's Unit, a branch which she created as a response to the growing importance of social networks and internet platforms as media.

Leibovich also held the position of Head of the Foreign Press Branch, acquiring over seven years of expertise working with foreign media, and establishing strong connections between the IDF and more traditional international media in many languages.

== See also ==
- American Jewish Committee
- IDF Spokesperson's Unit
- Israel Defense Forces
- Military of Israel
- State of Israel
