= Christophe Deloire =

French non-government organisation leader (1971–2024)

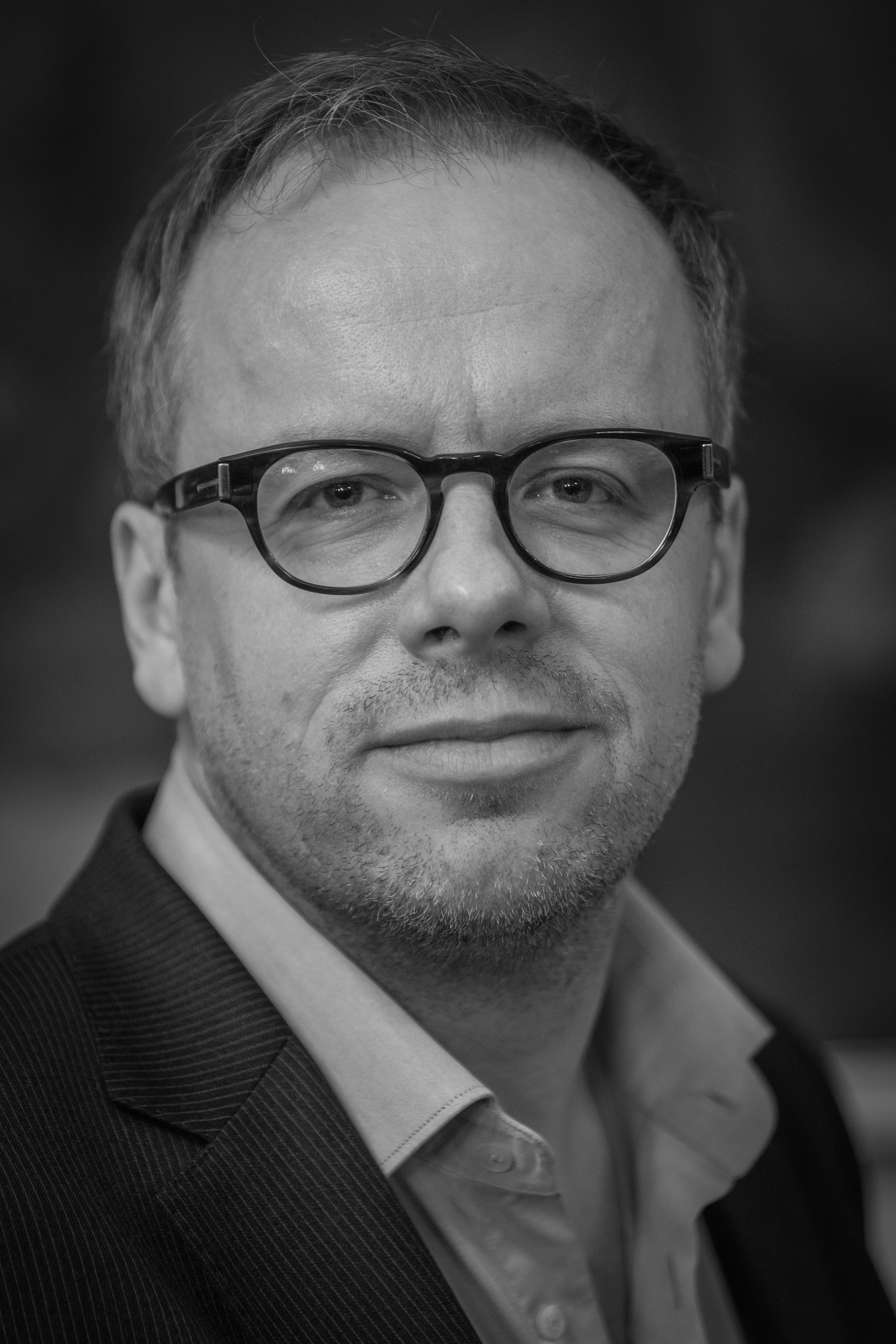
- Deloire in 2013
- Born: 22 May 1971; Paray-le-Monial, Saône-et-Loire, France
- Died: 8 June 2024 (aged 53); Paris, France
- Education: Lycée du Parc; ESSEC Business School
- Occupation: Journalist

Christophe Deloire (French pronunciation: [kʁistɔf dəlwaʁ]; 22 May 1971 – 8 June 2024) was a French non-governmental organization leader, author, and publisher.

Deloire was the director of the Centre de formation des journalistes de Paris from May 2008 to July 2012, and secretary general of Reporters Without Borders since July 2012. He was also the president of the Forum on Information and Democracy since November 2019.

Deloire died of a brain tumor on 8 June 2024, at the age of 53.
