= Yityish Titi Aynaw =

Ethiopian-born Israeli model; Miss Israel 2013

Yityish "Titi" Aynaw ייטיש "טיטי" עיינו
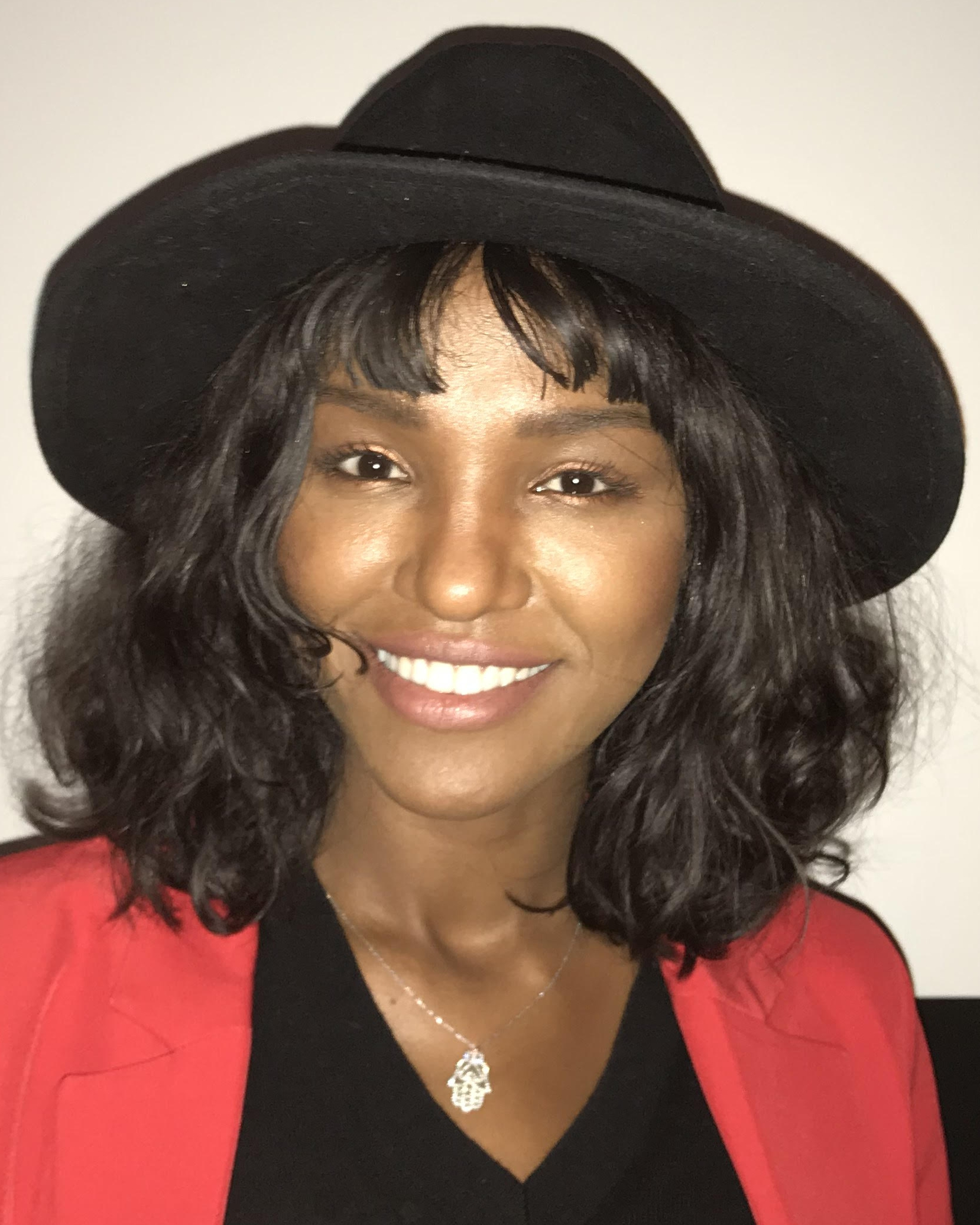
- Aynaw in 2017
- Born: Yityish Aynaw; 23 June 1991 (age 35); Gondar, Ethiopia
- Education: IDC Herzliya
- Height: 1.80 m (5 ft 11 in)
- Beauty pageant titleholder
- Title: Miss Israel 2013
- Hair color: Black
- Eye color: Brown
- Major competitions: Miss Israel 2013 (Winner); Miss Universe 2013 (Unplaced)

Yityish "Titi" Aynaw (Hebrew: טיטי איינאו; Amharic: ይታይሽ አየነው; born 23 June 1991) is an Israeli model, television personality, and beauty pageant titleholder who was crowned Miss Israel 2013. She is the first Ethiopian Jew and Israeli of African heritage to win the contest. As Miss Israel, Aynaw represented Israel at the Miss Universe 2013 competition, although she did not place.

== Early life and education ==
Aynaw was born in Gondar Province in Ethiopia, to an Ethiopian-Jewish family belonging to the Beta Israel community. In Ethiopia, the family was poor but Aynaw recalls her childhood being "often happy". Shortly after her birth, Aynaw's father died and her mother later died as well when Aynaw was ten years old. Now an orphan, Aynaw and her brother Yellek made Aliyah to Israel to live with their grandparents when she was twelve years old, settling in Netanya.

After arriving in Israel, Aynaw struggled with assimilation to Israeli culture and learning to speak Hebrew; however, she later began excelling. In school, Aynaw served as class president, competed in track and field, and won a national student filmmaking competition. After graduating from Kfar HaNoar HaDati, Aynaw began her mandatory enlistment in the Israel Defense Forces, serving as a lieutenant in the Israeli Military Police Corps. After completing her service, Aynaw worked in a clothing store in Netanya. She later attended the Interdisciplinary Center Herzliya in Herzliya.

== Career ==
Aynaw began her pageantry career after a friend had registered her for the Miss Israel 2013 competition; at the time, Aynaw had no modeling experience. She went on to win the competition in February 2013, and received massive national and international recognition for being the first black Israeli woman to be crowned Miss Israel. Her win was seen by many from the Beta Israel community as a positive sign for the representation of black Jews and specifically Ethiopian Jews in Israel. While reigning as Miss Israel, Aynaw raised awareness for the difficulty of Ethiopian Jews to make Aliyah to Israel, and helped several of her relatives come to Israel after having their immigration requests denied numerous times.

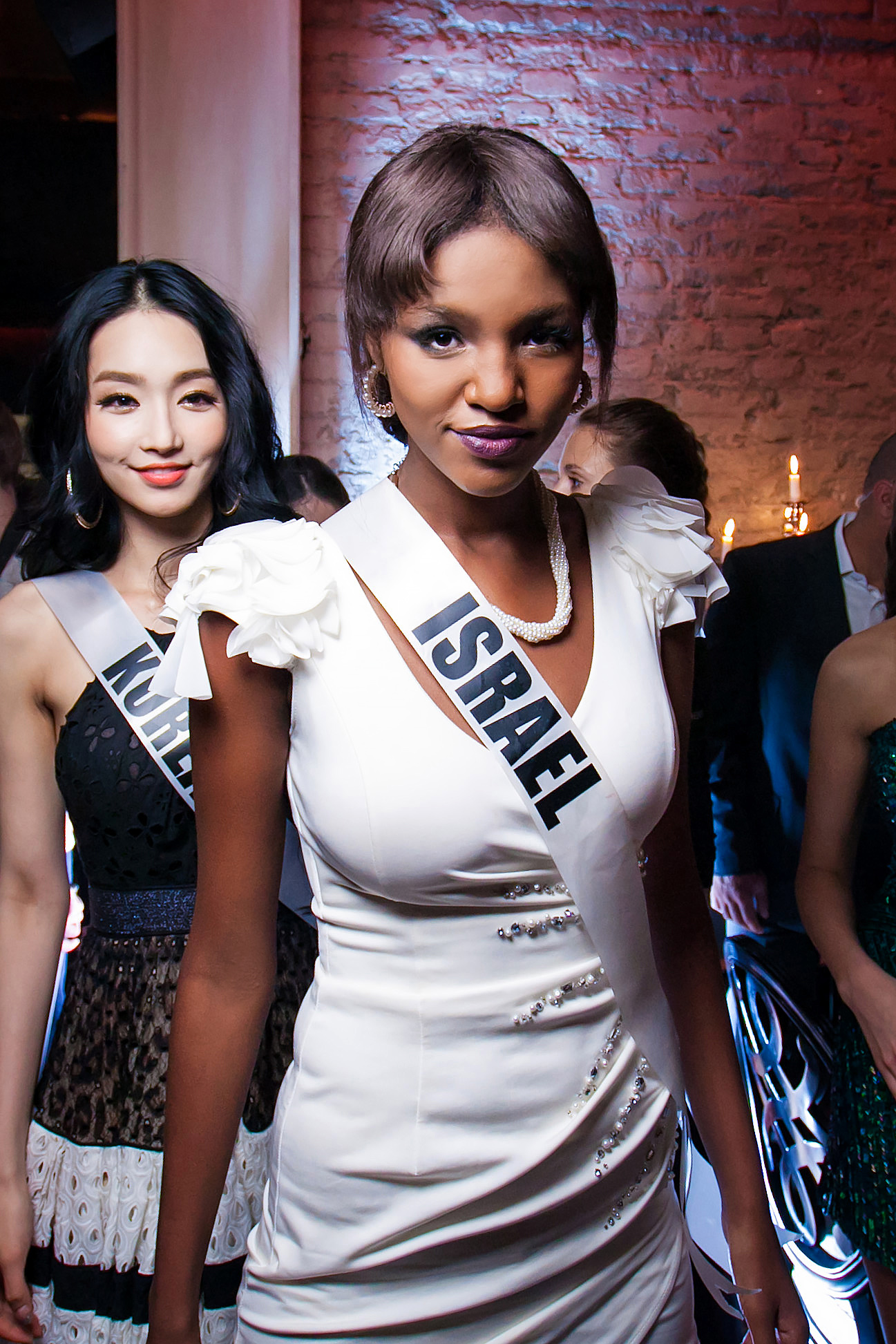
Aynaw at the Miss Universe 2013 that took place in Moscow

Following her win, Aynaw was invited by Barack Obama to attend a gala with Shimon Peres; Obama expressed admiration for Aynaw and referred to her as a "role model". As Miss Israel, Aynaw represented Israel in the Miss Universe 2013 competition held in Moscow, Russia; she ultimately did not place in the competition. Aynaw was later named the 39th most influential Jew of 2013 by The Jerusalem Post. After completing her reign, Aynaw crowned Mor Maman as her successor at the Miss Israel 2014 competition in March 2014.

In 2015, Aynaw competed as a celebrity contestant on Survivor: Honduras, the seventh season of the Israeli edition of the Survivor franchise. She went on to place as the season's runner up, behind Liron "Tiltil" Orfali. In 2016, Aynaw began work on establishing a community arts education center in Netanya to serve at-risk youth.

== Personal life ==
She married Tzachi Frenkel, an Israeli real estate entrepreneur, in 2023. They have 2 sons They reside in Netanya, Israel.

Aynaw stated in an interview that she wanted to work in the fashion industry, be a role model for her community, and to have a "big family" and "give my kids the experience I never had".

== See also ==
- Israeli fashion
- Ethiopian Jews in Israel
- Tahounia Rubel

Awards and achievements
Preceded by Shani Hazan	Miss Israel; 2013	Succeeded by Mor Maman
Preceded by Lina Makhuli	Miss Universe Israel; 2013	Succeeded by Doron Matalon
