= Avigail Alfatov =

Israeli model

Avigail Boblile אביגיל בובליל
- Born: Avigail Alfatov; February 28, 1996 (age 30); Acre, Israel
- Height: 1.72 m (5 ft 7 1/2 in)
- Beauty pageant titleholder
- Title: Miss Israel 2015
- Hair color: Blonde
- Eye color: Blue
- Major competitions: 2nd place (Na'arat Israel) at Miss Israel 2015; Miss Israel at Miss Universe 2015

Avigail Boblile (Hebrew: אביגיל בובליל; born 28 February 1996) is an Israeli national fencing champion, model and beauty pageant titleholder. She was crowned Na'arat Israel 2015 (Miss Israel's runner-up). She represented her native Israel at Miss Universe 2015.

== Personal life ==
She was born Avigail Alfatov (Hebrew: אביגיל אלפטוב) in Acre, Israel, to Ukrainian-Jewish (of Ashkenazi Jewish descent) immigrant parents. Alfatov's father is a graphic designer, and her mother is a teacher. Both her parents were born in Soviet Ukraine and immigrated to Israel, in order to escape antisemitism in the former USSR.

She graduated magna cum laude from high school. In her spare time, she volunteers for AKIM, an Israeli organization that works to help people suffering from intellectual disabilities.

She married her Israeli boyfriend Yossi Boblile in August 2017. They have a son named Ariel Boblile who was born in 2018, and another son named Dor Boblile who was born in 2020. Both her sons had a bris.

== Fencing ==
Alfatov began fencing in fourth grade, and is Israel's national youth fencing champion. She devotes four hours a day to fencing practice. She says: "I've taken part in a lot of fencing competitions around the world and I was already the past champion of Israel many times. My dream is to get to the Olympics and win." She hopes that modelling will help her to support her fencing career financially, as Israel will only pay for the first year of training to qualify for the 2020 Olympics.

== Israeli Air Force ==
Alfatov as of December 2015 served as a soldier in the Israeli Air Force.

== Beauty Pageants ==
On June 2, 2015, Alfatov was crowned Na'arat Israel 2015 (Miss Israel's runner-up), which resulted in her competing at Miss Universe 2015. The 66th Miss Israel contest was organized by La'Isha Magazine. The Miss Israel has handled Miss Universe and Miss World since 1952 and produced the following International Grand Winners; Rina Messinger (Miss Israel 1976), Miss Universe 1976 and Linor Abargil (Miss Israel 1998), Miss World 1998.

Alfatov competed as Miss Israel 2015 at Miss Universe 2015, but did not place.

== See also ==
- Israeli fashion

Awards and achievements
Preceded by Doron Matalon	Miss Israel; 2015	Succeeded by Karin Alia
