= Fastow =

Fastow is a surname. Notable people with the surname include:

- Andrew Fastow (born 1961), American convicted felon and financier
- Lea Fastow (born 1961), American businesswoman, wife of Andrew

== See also ==
- Fastiv
