= Lucy Aharish =

Arab-Israeli journalist and actress

- لوسي هريش
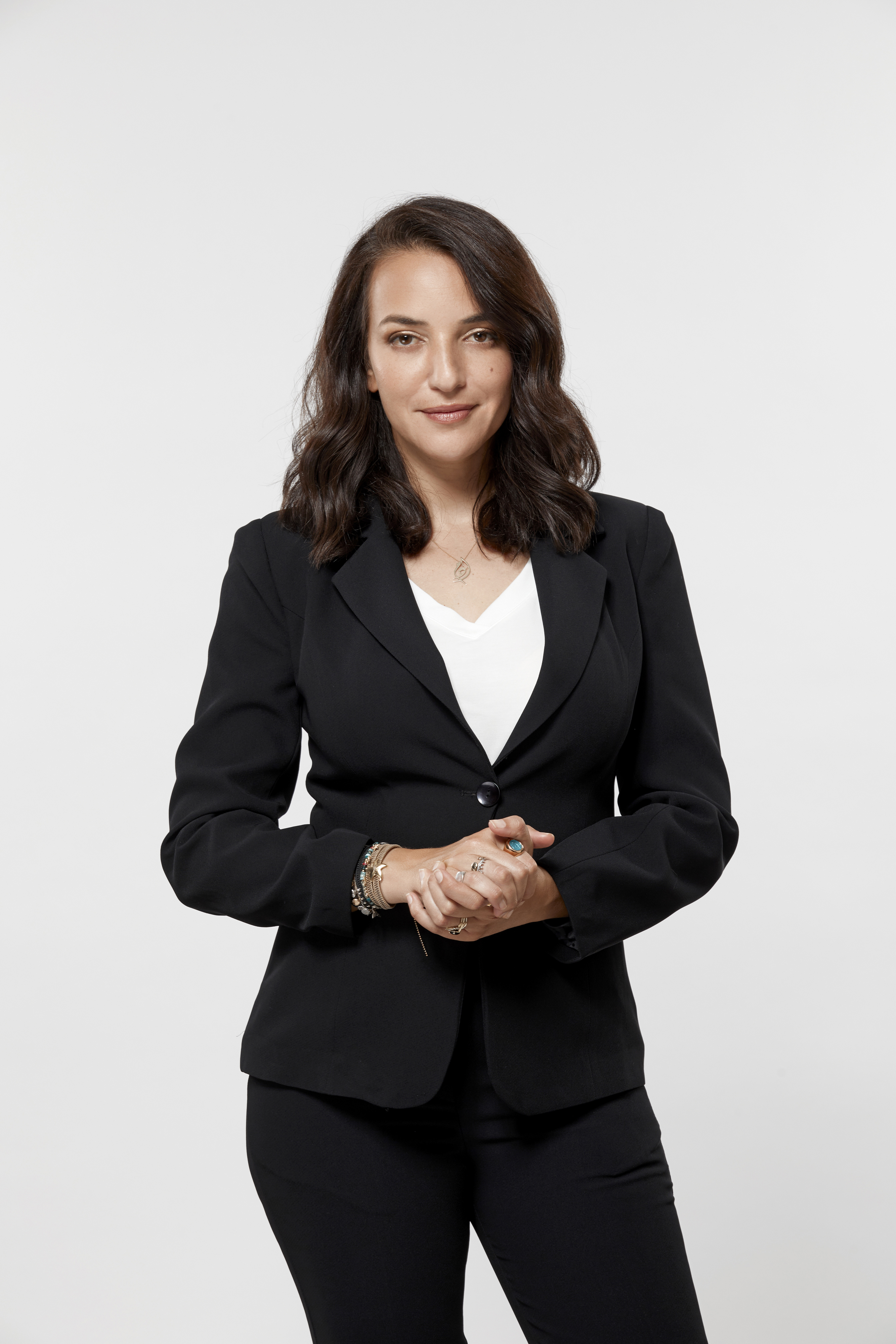
- Aharish in 2023
- Born: 18 September 1981 (age 44); Dimona, Israel
- Education: Hebrew University of Jerusalem
- Occupation: Journalist
- Years active: 2006–present
- Spouse: Tsahi HaLevi (m. 2018)
- Children: 1

Lucy Aharish (Arabic: لوسي هريش; Hebrew: לוסי אהריש; born 18 September 1981) is an Israeli journalist, news anchor, television host, and actress. She was the first Arab-Muslim news presenter on mainstream Hebrew-language Israeli television.

As of 2024, Aharish serves as a news anchor for Reshet 13. She was previously a morning anchor on a current-affairs show for its predecessor Channel 2, a presenter of the Evening Edition for i24NEWS, a news presenter and reporter for Channel 10, a co-host for Radio 99, a late-night co-host for Channel 1, as well as a co-host for Kan 11.

== Early life and education ==
Aharish was born in Nazareth, Israel, to an Arab Muslim family. Her parents Maaruf and Salwa Aharish were originally from the city. The family moved to Dimona, Israel, where Lucy grew up. She is the youngest of three daughters. Growing up, she was the only Arab student at her school. On Purim she dressed up as Queen Esther, and on Israeli Independence Day she wore blue and white. Later, in 2015, Aharish praised her former high school principal Meir Cohen (currently a Knesset member with the Yesh Atid party) for having fostered an uncompromising stance against racism.

In the summer of 1987, a few months before she turned six years old, she was slightly injured while driving in the Gaza Strip by a Molotov cocktail thrown at her family's car by Palestinian militants. Her three-year old cousin suffered severe burns all over his body and was hospitalized for months. In an interview with the Times of Israel in 2015, she recounted how "growing up, I couldn't understand how someone could be that evil."

During her adolescence, she says she was able to relate to right-wing voters: "I am an Arab who grew up among Moroccan Jews [in Israel]. That's the worst. You learn the hard-core shticks; they have a very short fuse. I was a right-wing Muslim, a fan of Beitar (Jerusalem soccer club with nationalistic fans)." In 2009, she identified with the left.

While at university, she drifted toward becoming a devout Muslim, although subsequently distanced herself from religious life. The idea of pursuing a career in media developed after she moved to Jerusalem to study social sciences and theater at Hebrew University. "[O]n Highway 1 I saw Arabs being taken out of a van and made to face a wall, with rifles aimed at them. I felt that no human being deserves that, and then the penny dropped. But it's also impossible to ignore what the Palestinians are doing." After graduating from Hebrew University, she studied journalism at the Koteret school in Tel Aviv and then interned for a year and a half at a school in Germany.

== Career ==
Upon returning from Germany, Aharish moved to Tel Aviv. Following a two-week stint as an Arab affairs reporter for Yedioth Ahronoth, in 2007, she became the first Arab to present the news on mainstream Israeli television when she was hired by Channel 10. After leaving that job in 2008, owing to professional differences, she went on to report for Channel 10's Erev Tov ("Good Evening") with Guy Pines and to co-host a morning radio show with Emmanuel Rosen and Maya Bengal.

In 2011, she co-hosted Channel One's late-night show, Nivheret ha-Halomot ("The Dream Team"), as well as Hamahadura ("The Edition"), a current events program for teens.

Aharish's time as anchor at i24news was one of some volatility. During Operation Protective Edge, she conducted an on-air interview with a Hamas official in Gaza, where she accused Hamas of using civilians as human shields and called on Gaza residents to rebel against the Hamas regime. Aharish interviewed Israeli President Shimon Peres in the Jaffa studios of i24news.

In April 2015, Aharish was one of twelve Israeli personalities chosen to light torches in the official ceremony kicking off Israel's 67th Independence Day celebrations.

In March 2020, Aharish started to co-host the daily edition of the television program "Culture Agent" along with Kobi Meidan on KAN 11. She was dismissed from KAN three days later because of a staff restructuring related to the COVID-19 pandemic, according to the Corporation. Some suggest she was fired for participating in a rally against Benjamin Netanyahu's handling of the pandemic. The same year, she participated in the Israeli production of The Masked Singer as The Stork.

== Personal life ==
She married Tsahi HaLevi on 10 October 2018 in a private ceremony. They have one son. Prior to announcing their marriage, the couple had kept their relationship a secret for four years due to fear of harassment. Public controversy followed the announcement of their marriage as HaLevi, who is Jewish, was repeatedly criticized by a number of right-wing Israeli politicians, such as Oren Hazan, for his act of "assimilation" through an inter-ethnic and inter-faith marriage with an Arab and Muslim woman. However, Hazan was subsequently denounced by other members of the Knesset as well as by other Israeli government officials, who congratulated the couple and wrote their colleagues off as racist.

After the October 7 attacks by Hamas, Aharish led a rally in November 2023 with over 1,000 women in the Hostages Square in Tel Aviv calling for the release of the more than 100 women among the hostages taken by Hamas during the attack and the sexual violence committed on October 7.

She has described her identity as "Israeli, woman, Arab Muslim", emphasizing the order of the words she used.

== See also ==
- Media of Israel
- Women in journalism and media professions
- Rana Raslan
- Lucy Ayoub
- Mira Awad
- Huda Naccache
