= Corinne Ben-Ami =

American artist and former Israeli beauty queen (born 1939)

Corinne Ben-Ami קורין בן-עמי
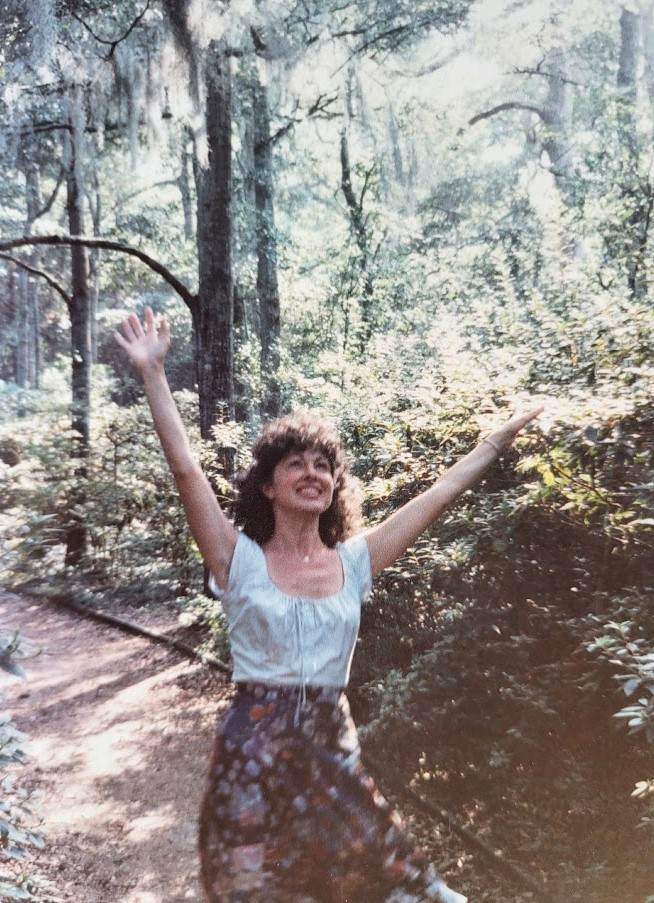
- Born: 1939 (age 86–87); Bucharest, Romania
- Other names: Corina Barzely; Korina Barzely; Corina "Atara" Barzely; Atara Barzely; Corinne Weissman
- Beauty pageant titleholder
- Title: Miss Israel 1957

Corinne Ben-Ami (Hebrew: קורין בן-עמי; born 1939) is an American artist and former model and Israeli beauty queen (known at that time as Corina "Atara" Barzely) who was crowned Miss Israel in 1957 and subsequently competed in the Miss Universe pageant.

== Early life ==
Born in Bucharest, Romania, in 1939, Ben-Ami is the daughter and only child to Jewish parents Jeanette and Emil Barzely. In the aftermath of World War II, the family was forced to flee from Romania to Israel. Ben-Ami attended Montefiore Technical High School in Tel Aviv.

== Miss Israel Beauty Pageant of 1957 ==
While wrapping up her senior year of high school, Ben-Ami was selected to compete in the Miss Israel national beauty pageant of 1957 in Tel Aviv, which was sponsored by La'Isha, an Israeli lifestyle magazine for women, and TIA, a cosmetics company. During the competition, she was chosen from 20 finalists and crowned "Miss Israel" on June 6, 1957, succeeding former beauty queen Sara Tal. Ben-Ami adopted the Hebrew first name Atara to represent Israel in the Miss Universe pageant.

== Miss Universe Beauty Pageant of 1957 ==
Ben-Ami competed as Atara Barzely in the Miss Universe competition in Long Beach, California, in July 1957. Her contestant profile at the time described her as having black hair and brown eyes, with measurements of 5’ 6’’, 115 pounds, 35-23-35; being fluent in French and Romanian languages (this was in addition to English, Spanish, and Hebrew); and excelling in the sport of swimming. In contrast with most of the other contestants who expressed the desire to become film actresses after the competition, Ben-Ami planned to study bacteriology in college and marry her fiancé. When the pageant was over, she stayed in the U.S. for several more weeks to help her homeland by promoting the Israel Bonds fall and winter campaign; she addressed over 30 meetings during that period.

== Personal life ==
Upon returning to Israel after the Miss Universe competition, Ben-Ami continued to model, and in 1958, she married Eugene Weissman. The couple settled in the United States; they share two sons, Ian Weissman (a radiologist) and Michael Weissman (a labor attorney), and a granddaughter, Natalie.

In 1962, Ben-Ami earned her bachelor’s degree in biology with a minor in chemistry at Case Western Reserve University and subsequently received her master's degree in library science (MLS) at Wayne State University on December 10, 1992, as well as earning membership into the Beta Phi Mu International Library Science Honor Society on April 21, 1993. During her time at Case Western Reserve University, Ben-Ami conducted research supported by grants from the United States Public Health Service, National Institutes of Health and from the American Cancer Society and co-authored the research results in a paper titled Pituitary Role in the Estrogen Dependency of Experimental Mammary Cancer, which has been cited at least 115 times in other scientific literature.

Ben-Ami is an accomplished artist, having entered her paintings in many contests and exhibits over the years, and has also worked as a librarian and a Hebrew language instructor. She currently lives in Michigan with her second husband, Franklin Ben-Ami.

== See also ==
- Miss Israel
- Miss Universe 1957
