= Nikol Reznikov =

Israeli model

Nikol Reznikov ניקול רזניקוב
- Born: Nikol Reznikov; December 27, 1999 (age 26); Afula, Israel
- Height: 1.76 m (5 ft 9 1/2 in)
- Beauty pageant titleholder
- Title: Miss Israel 2018
- Hair color: Brown
- Eye color: Green
- Major competitions: Miss Israel 2018 (Winner); Miss Universe 2018 (Unplaced)

Nikol Reznikov (Hebrew: ניקול רזניקוב; born December 27, 1999) is an Israeli model and beauty pageant titleholder who was crowned Miss Israel 2018 and represented Israel at Miss Universe 2018 pageant.

== Life and career ==
Reznikov was born in Afula, Israel, to parents Evgeni and Victoria. She studied communications in high school. Her father runs an Iscar department store and her mother is a bookkeeper. Her grandmother taught her Russian from a young age. Her mother was born in Tashkent, Uzbek SSR, USSR. Her father was born in Kyiv, Ukrainian SSR, USSR.

In 2020, Reznikov competed as a contestant on Survivor: VIP 3, the tenth season of the Israeli edition of the Survivor franchise.

== Pageants ==
=== Miss Israel 2018 ===
Reznikov won the Miss Israel 2018 pageant, succeeding Miss Israel 2017, Adar Gandelsman.

=== Miss Universe 2018 ===
Reznikov represented Israel at the Miss Universe 2018 pageant in Bangkok, Thailand. She was unplaced.

Awards and achievements
Preceded by Adar Gandelsman	Miss Israel; 2018	Succeeded by Sella Sharlin
