= Limor Shreibman-Sharir =

Israeli writer and physician (born 1954)

- לימור שרייבמן-שריר
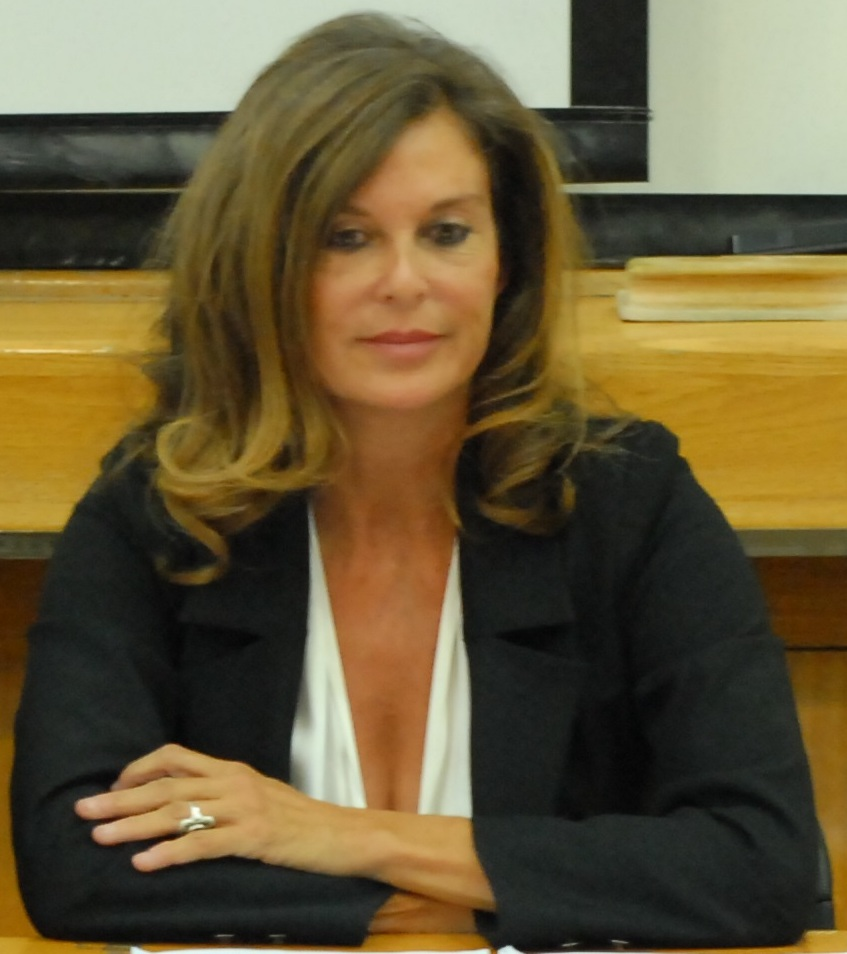
- Born: 1954 (age 71–72); Tel Aviv, Israel
- Title: Miss Israel 1973

Limor Shreibman-Sharir (Hebrew: לימור שרייבמן-שריר; born 1954) is an Israeli writer, physician and beauty pageant titleholder. She was crowned Miss Israel 1973 and represented her country at Miss Universe 1973 where she placed 4th runner-up.

== Biography ==
Limor Shreibman (later Sharir) was born and grew up in Tel Aviv, the daughter of Eliezer Shreibman, a school principal, a scholar with degrees in mathematics, law, and political science.

In 1972, after graduating from Tichon Ironi Alef high school, Shreibman was drafted into the Israeli army. In 1973, she won Israel's beauty queen contest. She was sent as a contestant to the Miss Universe contest held in Greece in 1973. During the pageant, there was a hostage incident in Athens an attempt to get Shreibman to drop out of the competition. However, she continued and was eventually selected as 4th runner up. When the competition was over, she returned to the IDF as a clerk for General Shmuel Gonen who had been promoted to Southern Command of the Israel Defense Forces.

== Medical career ==
After completion of her military service, she began to study medicine at Sapienza University of Rome in Italy. Later, she transferred to the Sackler Faculty of Medicine of Tel Aviv University and graduated with a medical degree. Her dissertation was presented to an international conference in New York and subsequently published in the Journal of Thoracic Cardiovascular Surgery.

Shreibman did her internship at Sheba Medical Center, where she worked for several years. Until the October 7th Massacre, she volunteered with the organization Physicians for Human Rights-Israel.

Since 2010–2025, she is a lecturer and coordinator of a course, which she designed especially for medical students, that combines literature and medicine studies at the Faculty of Medicine of Tel Aviv University." (Note: Eli Eshed, Medicine and literature - separate cultures?, On Eli Eshed's Multiverse website, 16 October 2010) Shreibman is a member in the Israeli Organization for Medical Education.

== Literary career ==
Limor Shreibman-Sharir with Israeli novelist Amos Oz

Sharir was a prose advisor for Carmel publishing house. She also sits on the Israeli Council for Culture and Arts in Ministry of Culture and Sport. She was a member of the editing board of "Moznayim" – the monthly Magazine of Hebrew Writers Association in Israel and the editor of culture and medicine section of the "Reshet Refua" website. A member of the Hebrew Writers' Association, served as a member of the "Mazenim" board.

Shreibman-Sharir's book "God and Elvira" published in 2005 in Hebrew, was translated into Italian and published in Italy in 2012.

She received a certificate of appreciation for a unique contribution to teaching from Tel Aviv University, and won the Dr. Einhorn Prize from the Tel Aviv Municipality in the study of literature and medicine for her book series: "Reflections on Literature and Medicine - Dilemmas in Doctor-Patient Relationships".

== Published works ==
- The House on the Lake, Yedioth Books. 2004.

Four childhood friends growing up in the villages at the foot of Wolfgang Lake. Salzkammergut area, Austria before World War II. In 1938, the world they knew changed when Germany occupied Austria, and they became citizens of Nazi Germany. Reading their thoughts and deeds we learn about the attitude of the Austrians toward Jews and various ethical and political issues through the eyes of the protagonists, non-Jewish Austrians. (Note: Attorney Yaakov Segal, "The Conscience Beneath the Green Coat and the Stethoscope", Book Review in the journal "Medicine and Law", issue number 31, December 2004. Interview with Sharir on Yaakov Segal's radio program "New on the Shelf" on Kol Israel, 2004. Interview with Sharir on the radio program "Black and White" by Attorneys Chaim Misgav and Oren Sharir, May 27, 2004.)

- God and Elvira, Carmel Publishing House, 2005.
- Red Wildberries, Carmel Publishing House, 2007.

The story takes place in the State of Israel in the 1990s, before the 1982 Lebanon War. Darya, an educated and assertive woman, a lecturer of Greek mythology at Tel Aviv University is single, without children and full of contradictions.

- The Gold and Silver Dunes, Carmel Publishing House, 2008. (Note: Limor Shreibman-Shrir,"Swimming" - a short story from the book: "The Gold and Silver Dunes" published by Carmel, on the DoctorsOnly website, September 13, 2017)

A collection of twenty two stories occurring in different places in Israel (Binyamina, Jewish Quarter, south Tel Aviv, Hadera) and the world (Paris, Munich, Salzburg, Palermo and Marrakesh).

- Menagerie of Fantasies, Carmel Publishing House, 2009.

The human life cycle described by animals with anthropomorphic illustrations by the author. (Note: Dr. Limor Sharir, Utopia Project: The Journey to Limor Sharir's Utopian World, Universe of Culture, November 12, 2023)

- Marrakesh Secrets, Carmel Publishing House, 2010.

The plot takes place in the days of king Hassan II of Morocco. Naim is a twelve-year-old boy living with his parents in Marrakesh. His father, Mahmud Laishi, a journalist and editor of "Morocco News" was murdered due to his political views. Morocco is depicted as a wild country, full of magic and decadence, sex and submission to the monarchic dictatorship.

- Martin Buber: Close look – A conversation with Prof. Judith Buber-Agassi, Carmel Publishing House, 2011.

A biographical-philosophical book based on Limor Sharir's conversations with Prof. Judith Buber-Agassi, Martin Buber's granddaughter. This is a personal story about an eminent Jewish family in the German world of the late 19th century and first half of the 20th century.

- Reflections – Letters to imaginary heroes in my books and life, Carmel Publishing House, 2013.

Sharir corresponds with the protagonists of her previously published works. She explains her motivations for writing, penetrates the souls of the protagonists, and reveals the connection between herself and them. The book also contains six short stories in which she corresponds with characters from her life - some real, some fictional.

- Reflections on Literature and Medicine - Dilemmas in Doctor-Patient Relationships, 8 volumes, published by the Faculty of Medicine of Tel Aviv University, 2016–2024

An eight-volume monograph that deals with the connection between literature and medicine and is part of the Literature and Medicine course - a program designed by Dr. Sharir for students at the Faculty of Medicine at Tel Aviv University, which she has directed since 2010. The book contains a reflection of medical aspects in both novels and short stories, alongside references by medical professionals to literary texts, and even includes letters from doctors who were also writers. The book contains scientific aspects of the world of medicine, along with poetics. In terms of literature, apart from sections Poetic, Dr. Sharir brings examples from Hebrew and world literature of the patient-doctor relationship and analyzes them. The book contains many examples of doctor-patient relationships in texts by canonical and well-known authors in the local and world literary scene. Sharir conducts research on this issue in the works of A. B. Yehoshua, Amos Oz, Haim Ba'er, Dan Benya Sari, Eli Amir, and even examines the representation of the medical world in her own works. From world literature, for example, Sharir refers, among others, to the works of Anton Chekhov, Mikhail Bulgakov, Albert Camus, Henrik Ibsen, William Carlos Williams, Janusz Korczak, and more. The author dwells on the issue of the image of the doctor in his own eyes, in the eyes of his patients, and in the eyes of the society within which the asymmetrical interaction between doctor and patient takes place.
The author devotes an extensive chapter to psychiatry, alongside a reference to the school of anti-psychiatry that presents the complexity of the field. Shreir reviews the history of medicine, deals with the dilemmas faced by doctors, the ethical issues they have faced in different periods and today in their attempts to cure diseases. Within this framework, Shreir's book includes the familiar discussions on death, euthanasia, medical ethics, the legal treatment of death ( the Law of the Dying Patient, the Law of the Rights of the Patient, ethical treaties between doctors and pharmaceutical companies, and more). The book also deals with Judaism's relationship to medicine as presented in the Torah and Talmud, references to Hippocrates and the Physicians' Oath, the Hippocratic Corpus, the brain in ancient times, doctors during World War II, and also what is currently considered the future of modern medicine: personalized medicine.
The book was presented to all graduates of the Faculty of Medicine of Ben-Gurion University in 2017, and a new edition was therefore published. The book was presented to medical graduates at the graduation ceremonies of the Faculty of Medicine of Tel Aviv University (Note: "לא רק מקצוע, אלא שליחות", Tel Aviv University, 19 June 2017) .

"On Maimonides and Medicine" - Volume Five in the Series, June 2020
The book's summary states: "Today's medicine largely continues the rationalist, positivist, and holistic approach of Maimonides, and therefore in the new era of medicine I see great importance in studying Maimonides' medical writings and understanding the path he paved in his approach to health, diagnosis, and treatment, in contrast to those practiced today."

Sharir won the 2021 Einhorn Prize in the field of Hebrew language and medical literature research for her five books in the "Reflections on Literature and Medicine" series (Note: פרס איינהורן בתחום חקר הלשון והספרות הרפואית העברית לד"ר לימור שרייבמן-שריר, באתר אוניברסיטת תל אביב, 13 ביולי 2021) .

Sharir edited 13 books of works by students in the Literature and Medicine course at the Faculty of Medicine at Tel Aviv University, from the following classes: 2011, 2012, 2013, 2014, 2015, 2016, 2017, 2018, 2019, 2020, 2021, 2022, 2023 ( on the National Library website ).

"The Image of the Doctor in the Age of Information and Technology" - Volume Six in the Series, published in March 2022

The book reviews the technological revolution, delves into terms such as artificial intelligence, data mining and data science, robotics, cyborgs, the Internet of Things, telemedicine, brain-machine interface, organs on a chip, stem cells, and genome sequencing, biological 3D printing, nanotechnology, biotechnology, material sciences, immunotherapy and the microbiome, metabolomics, energy storage, and more. The author dwells on moral and ethical dilemmas that arise in the era of new medicine, when alongside utopian dreams there are also dystopian nightmares, delves into security in the world of medicine and cybercrime. One chapter deals with fiction and science fiction films.

"On Epidemics and Corona - A Literary and Scientific Study" - Volume Seven in the Series, published in January 2023

The book deals in detail with the coronavirus pandemic and delves into the structure of coronaviruses, the strains of coronavirus, hypotheses about the origin of the disease, tests to identify the virus, risk factors for infection, the pathogenesis of the coronavirus and definitions of the severity of the disease, the symptoms of coronavirus disease, treatment of coronavirus, post-corona syndrome, the development of vaccines against coronavirus and the various immune mechanisms, while emphasizing the results of studies published in the global medical literature. It also deals with the different stages of the coronavirus waves in Israel . The author emphasizes the connection between the coronavirus pandemic and the digital revolution in medicine and delves into the legal and ethical dilemmas that arose due to the coronavirus pandemic. The book also addresses epidemics that appear in literature and reality described in canonical literature, such as the plague in Albert Camus, cholera in Thomas Mann, blindness in Saramago, and poliomyelitis in Schirr's book "God and Elvira." The author analyzes the literary descriptions alongside an analysis of these epidemics from a historical and contemporary medical perspective.

"Literature and Medicine in German-Speaking Works Between the Two World Wars" - Volume Eight in the Series, published in September 2024

The author analyzes seven works by renowned German-speaking writers who were active at the turn of the 20th century and after: Stefan Zweig, Arthur Schnitzler, Thomas Mann, and Franz Werfel . Most of the writers worked in Vienna during the period known as the Fin de siècle, a period in which modernism, psychiatry, and radical thought were born, when culture was then in a state of renewal and tumult, in transformations and fluctuations between decadence and the urge for renewal. She refers to the diseases and medical conditions that appear in some of their works, while comparing the approach to them in modern medicine. Particularly interesting is the author's reference to Franz Werfel's monumental book: " The Forty Days of Musa Dag ," while comparing the horrific genocide committed by the Turks against the Armenians described in it with the October 7, 2023 massacre that took place in Israel.

== Stories and articles written by her that were published in magazines ==
- "Swimming" (from the book "Dunes of Gold and Silver"), Mazanim, Issue No. 2, Volume 1, 2008, pp. 34–36.
- "The Gold and Silver Dunes (Painting in Words)" (from the book "The Gold and Silver Dunes"), Mosaic, Issue 72, Fall/Winter 2008/9, pp. 14–15.
- "A Journey to the Land of the Unconscious, or a Letter to a Character from the Illustration Album "The Beaver of Imaginations" (from the Book "The Beaver of Imaginations"), Mosaic, Issue No. 90, pp. 40–44.
- (Chapter 7 from the book "God and Elvira"), Mosaic, Issue 87, Summer 2012, pp. 30–32.
- "By the Moonlight of Marrakesh" (pp. 152–153 from the book "Secrets of Marrakesh"), Mosaic, Issue 80, Winter 2011, p. 36.
- "To float" (from the book "Reflections" ": Letters to imaginary heroes in my books and in my life"), Mazanim, issue no. 5, volume 7, Cheshon 5774, October 2013, pp. 48–49.
- "Longing for Ignacio" (from the book "Dunes of Gold and Silver"), Libra, May 2010.
- "Reflections on the vocation of a doctor," Balances, issue no. 4, August 2014, p. 43.
- "The Poverty of Language and the Poverty of Spirit," Mazanim, October 2014, p. 16.
- "Stromboli", Libra, Issue No. 1, Volume 9, February 2015, pp. 50–51.
- "On Hitler's Austria", Balance Sheets No. 3, Volume 9, June 2015, p. 11.
- "Dream" (poetic prose), in the issue of Love-themed scales in poems and fiction, issue no. 5, volume 9, October, page 41.
- "Mr.", Mosaic Summer-Fall 2015 Issue - No. 97, pp. 20–21.
- The story "Sunset" is included in the book Stories in the White Coat, published by the Israel Medical Association and Contento de Samrik, 2017, p. 122.
- "Reflections on Writing According to Williams Carlos Williams", Mosaic 100, Winter 2017, p. 12.
- "Reflections on Writing and Medicine", Libra, Issue No. 1, Volume 1, January 2017, p. 66.

== For further reading ==
- Sarit Yishai Levy, interview with Limor Sharir, in the newspaper Olam Is'a'ah, January 1, 2006.

=== Library Reviews ===
- Nurit Guvrin, "Limor Sharir: A Book of Correction and Hope"; in: Reading the Generations - Hebrew Literature in Its Cycles, Volume 6, Gvanim Publishing, 2015.
- Michael Kahanov, "Searching for the Middle," in the newspaper Makor Rishon (on the book "God and Elvira"), August 25, 2006.
- Herzl Hakak (on the book "The Beaver of Imaginations"), Mazanim, issue no. 2, volume 3, Sivan-Tammuz 5769, June 2009, pp. 61–62. ( in the
- Ron Margolin (on the book "Martin Buber: A Closer Look"), Mazanim, issue no. 3, volume 7, Tammuz 5773, June 2013, pp. 17–19. ( in the
- Amos Aricha, "The Gold Dunes" (on the book "The Gold Dunes and the Silver"), Mazanim, Issue No. 1, Volume 2, Av-Elul 5768, September 2008, pp. 60–61. ( in the
- Herzl Hakak, "A Watercolor of Gold and Pain" (on the book "Dunes of Gold and Silver"), Shabbat supplement in the Makor Rishon newspaper, August 22, 2008, p. 18.
- Yaakov Segal, "The Conscience Beneath the Green Coat and the Stethoscope" (on the book "The House on the Lake"), Medicine and Law, Issue No. 31 - December 2004, pp. 151–152.

== See also ==
- Literature of Israel
- Health care in Israel
