= Andrew Fastow =

American convicted felon and financier

- Born: Andrew Stuart Fastow; December 22, 1961 (age 64); Washington, D.C., U.S.
- Education: Tufts University (BA); Northwestern University (MBA)
- Spouse: Lea Weingarten
- Status: Released
- Criminal charges: Conspiracy, wire fraud, securities fraud, false statements, insider trading, and money laundering
- Penalty: Six years imprisonment, followed by two years of probation

Andrew Stuart Fastow (born December 22, 1961) is an American former financier who pled guilty to felony securities fraud and other crimes. Fastow was the chief financial officer of Enron Corporation, an energy trading company based in Houston, Texas, until he was fired shortly before the company declared bankruptcy. Fastow was one of the key figures behind the complex web of off-balance-sheet special purpose entities (limited partnerships which Enron controlled) used to conceal Enron's massive losses in their quarterly balance sheets. By unlawfully maintaining personal stakes in these ostensibly independent ghost-entities, he was able to defraud Enron out of tens of millions of dollars.

The U.S. Securities and Exchange Commission opened an investigation into his and the company's conduct in 2001. Fastow was sentenced to a six-year prison sentence and ultimately served five years for convictions related to these acts. His wife, Lea Weingarten, also worked at Enron, where she was an assistant treasurer; she pleaded guilty to conspiracy to commit wire fraud, money laundering conspiracy and filing fraudulent income tax returns, and was sentenced to 12 months in prison despite a plea bargain which proposed she serve five months in jail and five months in home-detention.

External images
- Andrew_Fastow
- Andrew_Fastow

== Early life and education ==
Fastow was born in Washington, D.C. He grew up in New Providence, New Jersey, the son of middle class Jewish parents, Carl and Joan Fastow, who worked in retail and merchandising. Fastow graduated from New Providence High School, where he took part in student government, played on the tennis team, and played in the school band. He was the sole student representative on the New Jersey State Board of Education.

Fastow graduated from Tufts University in 1983 with a B.A. in Economics and Chinese. While there, he met his future wife, Lea Weingarten, daughter of Miriam Hadar Weingarten (a former Miss Israel 1958), whom he married in 1984. Fastow and Weingarten both earned MBAs at Northwestern University and worked for Continental Illinois bank in Chicago. Both he and his wife attended Congregation Or Ami, a conservative synagogue in Houston where he taught Hebrew School.

== Early career ==
While at Continental, Fastow worked on the newly emerging "asset-backed securities". The practice spread across the industry "because it provides an obvious advantage for a bank", noted the Chicago Tribune. "It moves assets off the bank's balance sheet while creating revenue." In 1994, Continental became the largest U.S. bank to fail in American history until the seizure of Washington Mutual in 2008.

Due to his work at Continental, Fastow was hired in 1990 by Jeffrey Skilling at the Enron Finance Corp. Fastow was named chief financial officer at Enron in 1998.

== Collapse ==
In August, Skilling, who had been promoted to CEO of the entire company in February 2001, abruptly resigned after only six months, citing personal reasons. When reporters for The Wall Street Journal discovered an Enron "senior officer" had recently sold his interest in several partnerships that had done business with Enron, they initially thought that officer was Skilling. However, Enron spokesman Mark Palmer revealed that the "senior officer" was actually Fastow.

After a former Enron executive leaked a copy of the offering memorandum for one of Fastow's partnerships, LJM–named for Fastow's wife and two sons–to the Journal, reporters bombarded Enron with further questions about the partnerships. The scrutiny died down after the September 11 attacks, but ramped up anew two weeks later with pointed questions about how much Fastow had earned from LJM. This culminated in a series of stories that appeared in the Journal in mid-October detailing the "vexing conflict-of-interest questions" about the partnerships, as well as the huge windfall he had reaped from them.

On October 23, during a conference call with two directors delegated by the board, Fastow revealed that he had made a total of $45 million from his work with LJM–a staggering total, since he claimed to spend no more than three hours a week on LJM work. On October 24, several banks told Enron that they would not issue loans to the company as long as Fastow remained CFO. The combined weight of these revelations led the board to accept Lay's recommendation to remove Fastow as CFO on October 25, replacing him with industrial markets chief and former treasurer Jeff McMahon. He was officially placed on leave of absence, though the board subsequently determined that it had grounds to fire him for cause.

It was later revealed that Fastow had been so focused on creating SPEs that he had neglected the most rudimentary aspects of corporate finance. Under his watch, Enron merely operated on a quarterly basis. Fastow never implemented procedures for tracking the company's cash or debt maturities. As a result, McMahon and a "financial SWAT team" put together in the wake of Fastow's ouster discovered Enron had almost no liquidity.

Fastow's approach to hiding losses was so effective that the year before Enron declared bankruptcy, Enron stock was at an all-time high of $90. As it turned out, the company was already well on its way to financial collapse, to the point that it was all but forced to seek a merger with rival Dynegy. By then, Enron's financial picture had declined so rapidly that the prospect of the Dynegy merger was the only thing keeping it alive. Dynegy cancelled the merger agreement on November 28 in part due to the liquidity problems revealed after Fastow's ouster, and Enron declared bankruptcy three days later. By then, Enron's stock had dwindled to 40 cents per share, but not before many employees had been told to invest their retirement savings in Enron stock.

== Sentencing and incarceration ==
On October 31, 2002, Fastow was indicted by a federal grand jury in Houston, Texas, on 78 counts, including fraud, money laundering, and conspiracy. His wife was indicted as well, and the prospect of leaving their children without parents at home led him to take a plea deal. On January 14, 2004, he pleaded guilty to two counts of wire and securities fraud, and agreed to serve a ten-year prison sentence. He also agreed to become an informant and cooperate with federal authorities in the prosecutions of other former Enron executives in order to receive a reduced sentence.

After entering into a plea agreement with a maximum penalty of 10 years in prison and the forfeiture of $23.8 million in assets, on September 26, 2006, Fastow was sentenced to six years in prison, followed by two years of probation. U.S. District Judge Ken Hoyt believed Fastow deserved leniency for his cooperation with the prosecution in several civil and criminal trials involving former Enron employees. Hoyt recommended that Fastow's sentence be served at the low-security Federal Correctional Institution in Bastrop, Texas. Fastow was incarcerated at the Federal Prison Camp near Pollock, Louisiana. On May 18, 2011, Fastow was released to a Houston halfway house for the remainder of his sentence.

== Life after incarceration ==
Soon after his release on December 16, 2011, he began working as a document review clerk for law firm Smyser Kaplan Veselka LLP in Houston.

=== Speaking engagements ===
Since his release, Fastow has worked the public speaking circuit with presentations on ethics and business. In one such speech, Fastow recounts his crimes at Enron and reflects on his guilt:

“I found every way I could to technically comply with the [accounting] rules... But what I did was unethical and unprincipled. And it caused harm to people. For that, I deserved to go to prison.”

In March 2012, Fastow spoke on ethics to students at the University of Colorado Boulder Leeds School of Business.

In June 2013, Fastow addressed more than 2,000 anti-fraud professionals at the Association of Certified Fraud Examiners' 24th Annual ACFE Global Fraud Conference.

In April 2014, Fastow spoke at Miami University in Oxford, Ohio, regarding business ethics.

In February 2015, he spoke at: the University of St. Thomas, the University of Minnesota, the University of Texas (Austin campus), the University of Houston Bauer College of Business, the University of Southern California's Leventhal School of Accounting, and the University of Missouri School of Accounting.

In April 2016, March 2017, March 2018, and March 2019 Fastow spoke at the Ivey Business School. The University of Tampa's Center for Ethics hosted him in October 2017. In March 2022 the National Investor Relations Institute New York Chapter hosted Fastow as guest speaker for a discussion on business ethics, and the ambiguity and complexity of laws and regulations.

=== Investment in KeenCorp ===
Fastow became principal and investor in KeenCorp in 2016. KeenCorp is a Netherlands-based company that offers analytics and artificial intelligence products that monitor "day-to-day workflow: E-mails, Microsoft Teams chats, Google Suite, and Slack" in order to analyze employee sentiment and engagement.

Originally, Fastow connected with KeenCorp when the company was beta testing its software using a digital database of Enron emails.

== In the media ==
A number of books have been written about Enron and Fastow.

In 2003, Fastow was a prominent figure in 24 Days: How Two Wall Street Journal Reporters Uncovered the Lies that Destroyed Faith in Corporate America by the reporters who had broken some of the key stories in the saga, Rebecca Smith and John R. Emshwiller. They painted Fastow as in their words "a screamer, who negotiated by intimidation and tirade".

Also in 2003, Bethany McLean and Peter Elkind wrote the book The Smartest Guys in the Room: The Amazing Rise and Scandalous Fall of Enron ISBN 1-59184-008-2. In 2005, the book was made into a documentary film Enron: The Smartest Guys in the Room.

In 2005, Kurt Eichenwald's Conspiracy of Fools features Fastow as the book's antagonist.

In 2009, Lucy Prebble's play Enron featured Fastow as a lead character.
