= Melanie Shiraz =

Israeli model

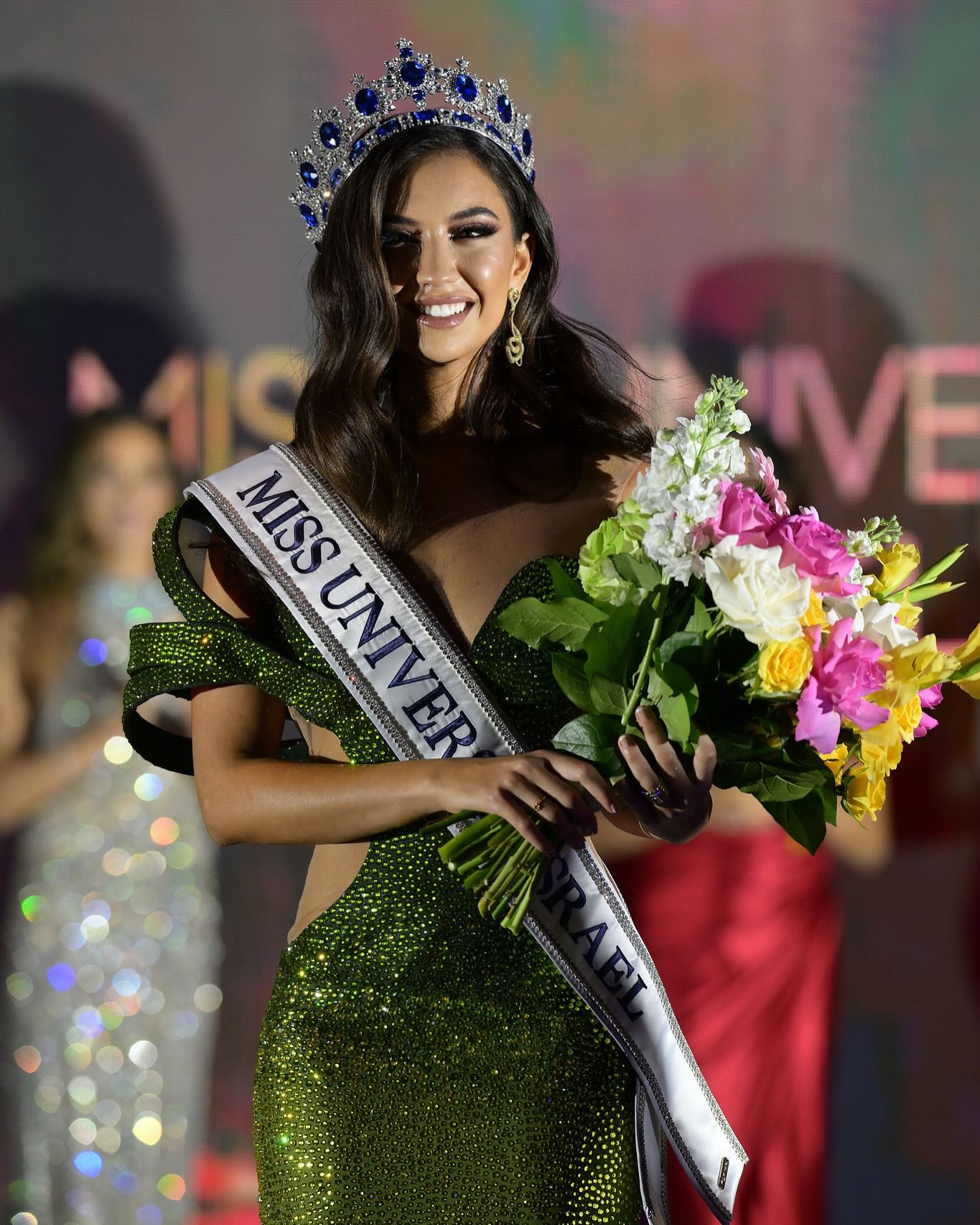
- Shiraz at Miss Israel 2025
- Born: Melanie Asor; November 13, 1998 (age 27); Israel
- Education: University of California, Berkeley (BA); Tel Aviv University (MBA)
- Occupations: Data scientist, entrepreneur
- Beauty pageant titleholder
- Title: Miss Israel 2025
- Major competitions: Miss Universe Israel 2025 (Winner); Miss Universe 2025 (Unplaced)

Melanie Shiraz Asor (Hebrew: מלאני שירז עשור; born November 13, 1998) is an Israeli beauty pageant titleholder who was crowned Miss Israel in 2025. She represented Israel at the Miss Universe 2025 pageant, which took place on 21 November 2025 in Thailand.

== Biography ==
Shiraz was born in Israel. She is the daughter of Israeli commentator Estee Shiraz.

The family moved to the United States when Melanie was young. She graduated from the University of California, Berkeley, where she earned a double degree in data science and interdisciplinary studies. She was also involved in Chabad, the campus Jewish Student Union, and Hillel. She returned to Israel shortly after graduating. After working in Silicon Valley, she earned an MBA at Tel Aviv University and co-founded a fintech startup in London.

== Pageantry ==
Shiraz competed as "Miss Caesarea" to represent Israel at the Miss Universe 2025 pageant. She was crowned Miss Universe Israel at the Hilton Miami Aventura Hotel in 2025. Upon her victory, she told The Jerusalem Post that she wanted to use the title as an opportunity for "meaningful advocacy," and added, "I want every Jew and Israeli, no matter where they are, to feel proud of this moment."

Shiraz has been targeted with online abuse since being named Miss Universe Israel. She has criticized Nadeen Ayoub for using her platform to spread falsehoods about the October 7 attacks and the Gaza War.

At the Miss Universe 2025 competition, Shiraz wore a yellow dress decorated with a Star of David and embroidered with anemones, the national flower of Israel. Shiraz intended the design as a tribute to the Gaza war hostages and victims of the conflict.

Awards and achievements
Preceded by Ofir Korsia	Miss Israel; 2025	Succeeded by Danielle Yablonka
