= Adar Gandelsman =

Israeli model and Miss Universe Israel 2017

- Born: 5 December 1997 (age 28); Ashkelon, Israel
- Height: 1.74 m (5 ft 8 1/2 in)
- Beauty pageant titleholder
- Title: Miss Israel 2017 (Winner for Miss Universe)
- Hair color: Brown
- Eye color: Green
- Major competitions: Miss Israel 2017 (Winner for Miss Universe); Miss Universe 2017 (Unplaced)

Adar Gandelsman (Hebrew: אדר גנדלסמן; born 5 December 1997) is an Israeli model and beauty pageant titleholder. She was the first runner-up at Miss Israel 2017, receiving the title of Miss Universe Israel, and competed at the Miss Universe 2017 pageant.

== Biography ==
Gandelsman was born in Ashkelon, Israel, to Brazilian Jewish parents who immigrated to Israel.

She served as a soldier in the Israel Defense Forces from 2016 to 2018.

== Modeling career ==
After coming in second place at Miss Israel 2017, Gandelsman was crowned Miss Universe Israel 2017. Adar succeeded Miss Universe Israel 2016 Yam Kaspers Anshel and represented Israel at the Miss Universe 2017 pageant.

Adar competed at the Miss Universe 2017 pageant in Las Vegas, but did not place. At the pageant, Gandelsman took a selfie with Sarah Idan, Miss Universe Iraq that year. In December 2017 Idan and her family fled Iraq due to outrage from Iraqi citizens over her posing for a photo with Miss Israel who had also served in the Israel Defense Forces at the time.

== See also ==
- Israeli fashion

Awards and achievements
Preceded by Karin Alia	Miss Israel; 2017	Succeeded by Nikol Reznikov
