= Illana Diamant =

Israeli actress and producer

Illana Shoshan אילנה שושן
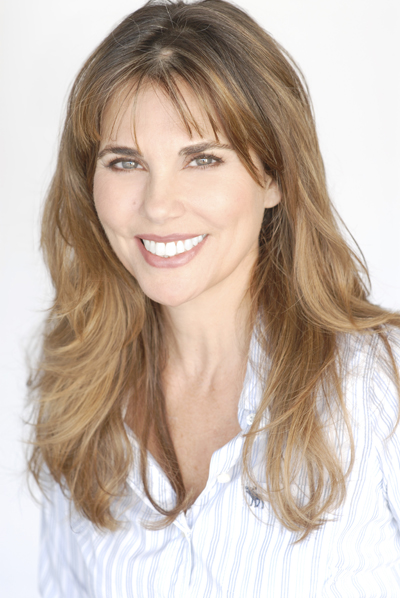
- Born: Illana Shoshan; Israel
- Other name: Illana
- Modeling information
- Hair color: brown
- Eye color: greenish
- Website: illanashoshan.com

Illana Diamant (Hebrew: אילנה דיאמנט), better known as Illana Shoshan (Hebrew: אילנה שושן) is an Israeli actress, producer, activist and beauty pageant titleholder who was crowned Miss Israel 1980 and represented her country at Miss Universe 1980.

== Biography ==
Shoshan was born in Israel, where she was crowned as Miss Israel in 1980. She went on to become an international model, which brought her to the Lee Strasberg Theatre and Film Institute in New York City where she studied acting. She then moved from New York to Los Angeles, where she took acting classes and story development at UCLA. Within two years of moving to Los Angeles, Illana produced her first film, Joshua Tree, starring Dolph Lundgren. After marrying film producer Moshe Diamant, the couple formed Signature Entertainment group, where Illana was Head of Development. She also served as Casting Director on Signature films including Hairy Tale, The Body, and Knock Off, and developed and produced the upcoming Funky Monkey from Warner Brothers.

In 2003, Shoshan produced Imaginary Heroes written and directed by Dan Harris starring Emile Hirsch, Sigourney Weaver, Jeff Daniels, and Michele Williams. Shoshan led a fashion campaign for the Israeli Fashion line CRAZY LINE. She also did a Ted talk on "Breaking The Mold And Rising Above". Illana went back to school to get her LLB and MA in law and passed the bar.

In 2010, on the 60th anniversary of the Miss Israel pageant, Illana was elected Miss Israel of All Time (Queen of Queens) in an open vote.

Illana is a board member of IWN Israeli Women Network, and a board member of The Gesher Film Foundation.
