= Sivan Klein =

Israeli model and beauty queen (born 1984)

Sivan Klein סיון קליין
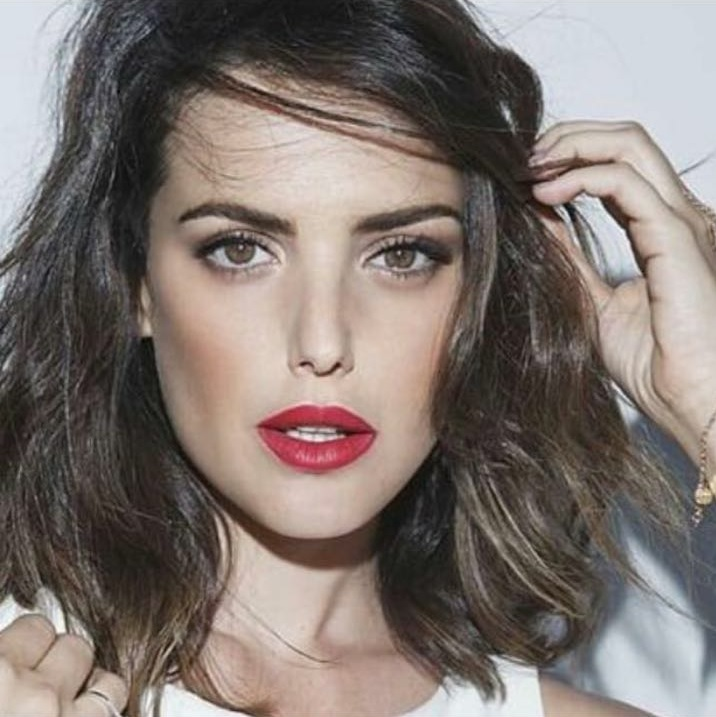
- Klein, 2016
- Born: 26 August 1984 (age 41); Jerusalem, Israel
- Occupations: Television host, radio host
- Beauty pageant titleholder
- Title: Miss Israel 2003
- Hair color: Black
- Eye color: Hazel

Sivan Sarah Klein (Hebrew: סיון קליין; born 26 August 1984) is an Israeli model and beauty pageant titleholder who represented her country at the Miss Universe 2003 pageant in Panama City, Panama after she was crowned Miss Israel 2003. She is a television and radio host.

== Early life ==
Klein was born in Jerusalem, Israel, to an Ashkenazi Jewish family. Klein was serving as a soldier in the Israel Defense Forces during her participation in the Miss Israel pageant.

She studied law and business management at the IDC Herzliya college.

== Miss Israel 2003 ==
Sivan Klein joined the Miss Israel pageant ("Israel's Beauty Queen") in 2003, in which she won the most-coveted title Israel's Beauty Queen, replacing last year's winner Yamit Har-Noy. She won the rights to represent Israel at the Miss Universe 2003 pageant in Panama.

== Miss Universe 2003 ==
Sivan Klein flew to Panama for the Miss Universe 2003 pageant. She was a favourite to make it into the Top 15. However, she did not make the cut. She was 19 years old when she represented Israel in this pageant.
