= Miriam Hadar Weingarten =

Israeli journalist, lawyer, and beauty pageant winner

Miriam Hadar Weingarten מרים הדר וינגרטן
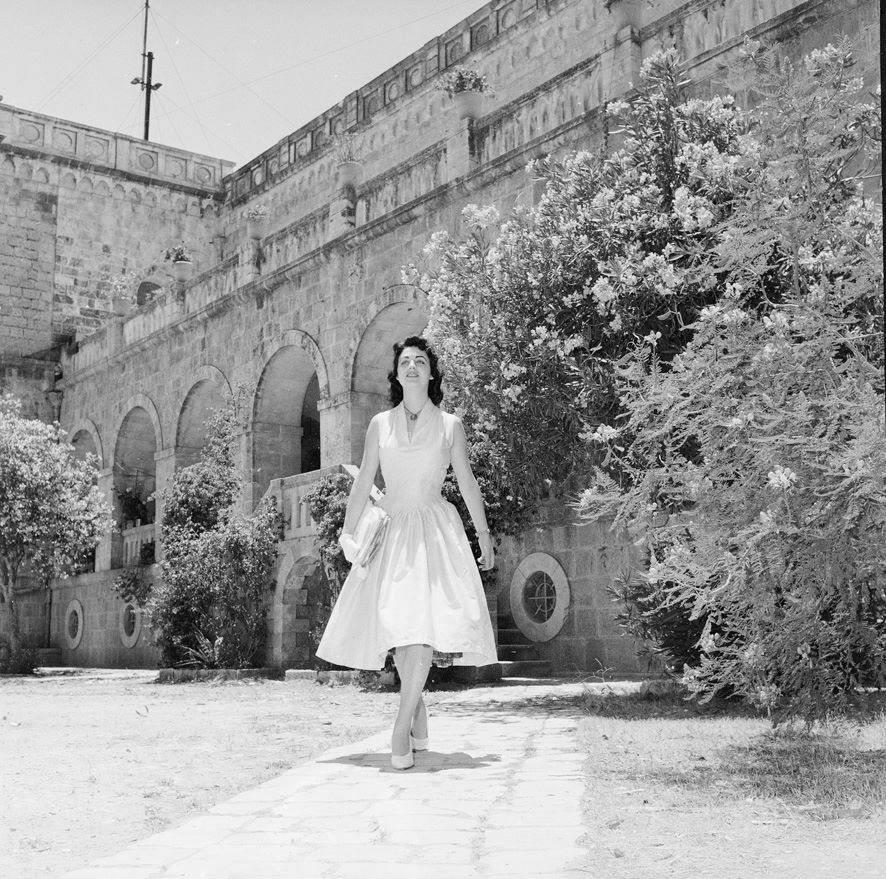
- Hadar in Jerusalem as Miss Israel
- Born: Miriam Hadar; Jerusalem, Mandatory Palestine (now Israel)
- Other name: Mira Weingarten
- Spouse(s): Jack Weingarten (2 children); Akiva Nof (1 daughter)
- Children: 3 (including Lea Fastow)
- Relatives: Andrew Fastow (son in law)
- Beauty pageant titleholder
- Title: Miss Israel 1958
- Major competitions: Miss Israel 1958 (Winner); Miss Universe 1958 (Top 15)

Miriam Hadar Weingarten (Hebrew: מרים הדר וינגרטן) is an Israeli-American lawyer, model and beauty pageant titleholder who was crowned Miss Israel 1958 and represented Israel at Miss Universe 1958.

== Life ==
Hadar-Weingarten was born in Jerusalem, Mandatory Palestine (Israel). She did her military service in the Israeli Air Force while studying law at the Hebrew University of Jerusalem. In 1958, she won the title of Beauty Queen of Jerusalem and Beauty Queen of Israel.

She represented Israel in the Miss Universe pageant, where she placed among the finalists and won the trophy for the Best Speech. After this experience, she embarked on a three-year government-sponsored lecture tour throughout the US and Canada.

Upon returning to Israel, Hadar-Weingarten was a writer and editor for 17 years on the staff of the newspapers Ha'aretz and Ma'ariv, where she reported on the government and Knesset.

Her first husband was Jack Weingarten, a Texan, of the Weingarten's supermarket chain; she had two children with him. In parallel with her family life she began to study cinema at Tel Aviv University. After her divorce she married Knesset Member Akiva Nof and later gave birth to a daughter, Ayelet. She began to teach at Tel Aviv University and later emigrated to New York.

During the 1973 Yom Kippur War, Hadar Weingarten was the first woman to cross the Suez Canal into Egypt with the Israeli Armed Forces. To get to the front lines - ordinarily forbidden to women - she disguised herself as a man, wearing a helmet, boots and male uniform. She recorded the bitter fighting and bloody horrors throughout the war.

== Other ==
Hadar Weingarten moved to New York City, where she had a career in real estate. She received the Real Estate Board of New York Residential Deal Award.

Her daughter, Lea, married Andrew Fastow, convicted in the Enron scandal.

== Sources ==
- "Weingarten wins REBNY award", Real Estate Weekly (New York City). December 11, 2002.
- " On the Israeli front: Mira Weingarten - first woman across Suez Canal", The Houston Post January 11, 1975. Page 3B.
- "Charming Sabra: Lovely, Brainy Miss Israel Has Led a Colorful Life," Charleston Evening Post March 4, 1959.
- "Beauty Queen, Military Veteran, Plans Career in Foreign Service," The Greenville News May 27, 1959.
- "Most Beautiful Sergeant in World Visits Here," Evening Sun (Baltimore) June 1, 1959.
- כל אבן לוחשת היסטוריה: מלכות היופי הירושלמיות חוזרות לילדות
- מרים הדר: 'לא רציתי שיידעו שהייתי מלכת יופי. היום זה נראה לי כבוד'

Awards and achievements
| Preceded by Atara (Korina) Barzilay | Miss Israel; 1958 | Succeeded by Rina Yitzchakov (Izakov) |
