= Sella Sharlin =

Miss Israel 2019

Sella Sharlin סלע שרלין
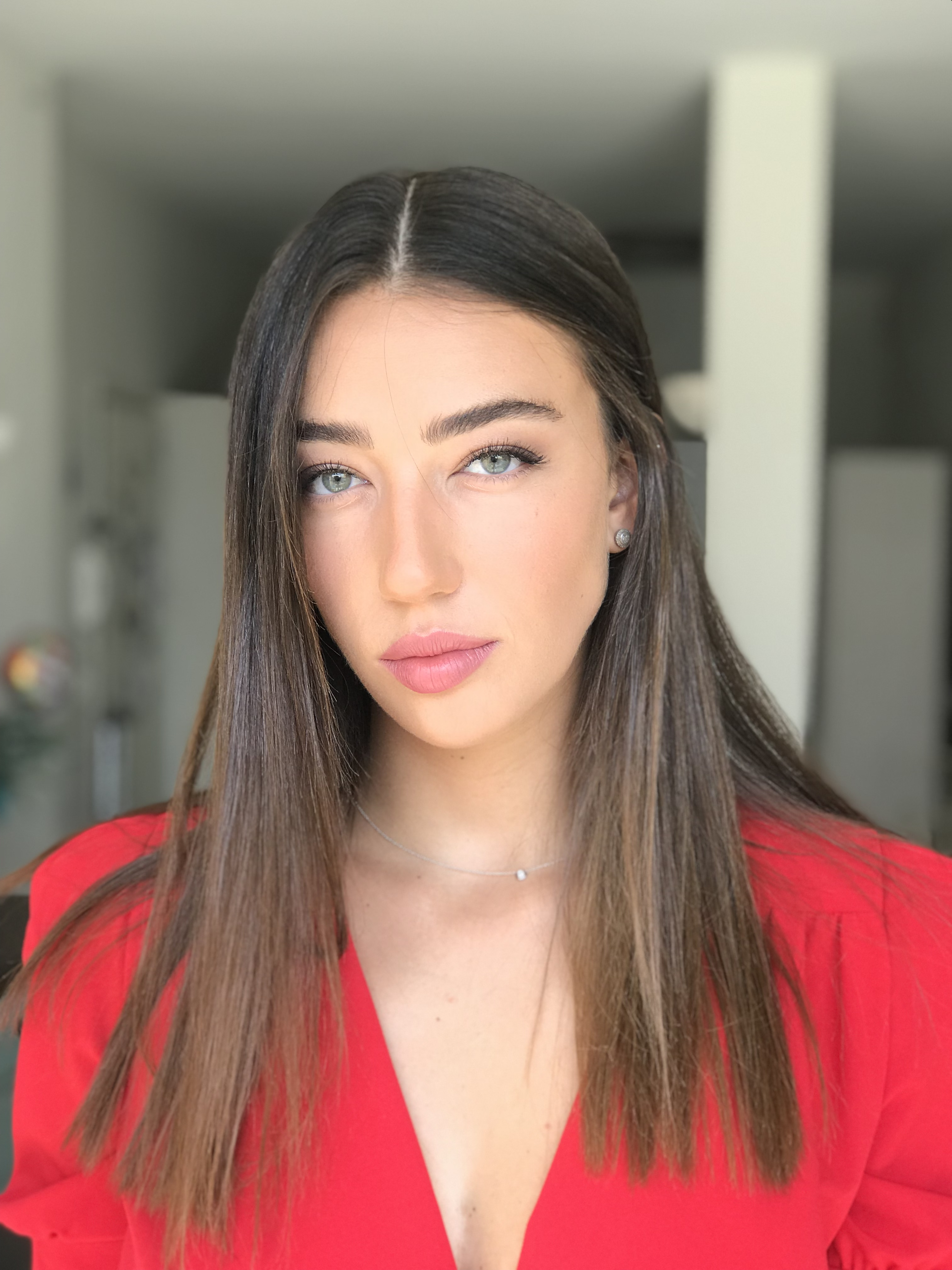
- Sella Sharlin, 2019
- Born: August 20, 1996 (age 30); Boston, Massachusetts, U.S.
- Height: 5 ft 10 in (178 cm)
- Beauty pageant titleholder
- Title: Miss Israel 2019
- Hair color: Brown
- Eye color: Green
- Major competitions: Miss Israel 2019 (Winner); Miss Universe 2019 (Unplaced)

Sella Sharlin (Hebrew: סלע שרלין; born August 20, 1996) is an American-Israeli model and beauty pageant titleholder who was crowned Miss Israel 2019 and represented Israel at the Miss Universe 2019 pageant.

== Early life ==
Sharlin was born in Boston to her parents during their dentistry studies. She was a runner-up at the horseback riding national championship of Israel, for the 10–12 age groups.

Her first name in Hebrew means "rock". After graduating high school, Sella served as a soldier in the Israel Defense Forces for 3 years. She started in a combat pilot course and then transferred to an intelligence unit.

Sella Sharlin is passionate about sports. She trained as a professional triathlete for seven years and won first place in the European Triathlon Championship age group category. She volunteered in "Olimpizem" program by the Olympic Committee. In her free time, Sharlin gave lectures to youth about motivation to dare and tools for success. Sharlin works as a system operator in a high tech company. In 2020, she began her undergraduate studies at the IDC Herzliya college in Herzliya, Israel.

=== Pageant participation (Miss Israel 2019) ===
Sharlin began her pageantry career representing moshav Beit Yitzhak, Israel, in the Miss Israel 2019 competition on 26 March 2019, where she was crowned as Miss Universe Israel 2019 pageant, gaining the right to represent her country at Miss Universe 2019. She battled out 11 other contestants in the contest to claim the title. At the same pageant, Uliana Fridrih was crowned as the first runner-up. On March 31, 2019, she was crowned by Nikol Reznikov. As Miss Israel, Sharlin earned the right to represent her country at the 68th Miss Universe pageant.

Awards and achievements
Preceded by Nikol Reznikov	Miss Israel; 2019	Succeeded by Tehila Levi
