= Noa Cochva =

Miss Israel 2021

Noa Cochva נועה כוכבא
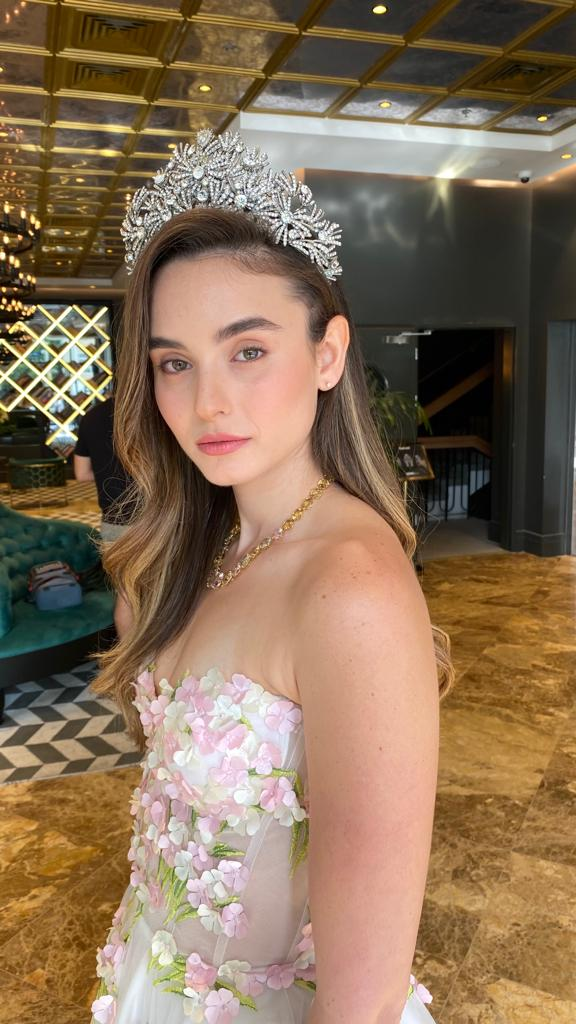
- Miss Israel 2021, Noa Cochva
- Born: February 19, 1999 (age 27); Bnei Atarot, Israel
- Beauty pageant titleholder
- Title: Miss Israel 2021
- Hair color: Brown
- Major competitions: Miss Israel 2021 (Winner); Miss Universe 2021 (Unplaced)

Noa Cochva (Hebrew: נועה כוכבא; born February 19, 1999) is an Israeli beauty pageant titleholder and model who was crowned Miss Israel 2021. She represented Israel at the Miss Universe 2021 pageant, held in Eilat.

== Early life ==
Cochva was born in the Neve Savion neighborhood of Or Yehuda, Israel. She is of Libyan Jewish heritage through her grandmother, who was born in Tripoli and fled to Israel in the midst of the 1948 Arab-Israeli War. Noa spent her childhood and received her education in the Bnei Atarot moshav. Her father, Eyal, was a pilot and squadron commander before working as a start-up business consultant and advisor. Her mother, Yael, served in the Israeli Air Force and is now a clinical psychologist and marriage therapist. Cochva has two brothers and two half-siblings from her father's first marriage.

As a child, Cochva was diagnosed with thrombocytopenia, a blood disorder affecting platelet production. This required intermittent hospitalization for a year and a half. This experience sparked her interest in medicine, leading her to pursue a career in the field.

== Career and public activity ==
Following her studies, Cochva served in the Israel Defense Forces as a medic, later becoming an instructor and commander in a medical course. After completing her military service, she spent eight months studying at the baking and pastry school of chef and television presenter Estella Moshkovich-Belfer. She then worked as a pastry chef in a Yehud-Monosson restaurant until the COVID-19 pandemic forced its closure.

In 2021, Cochva was crowned Miss Israel. She represented Israel at the Miss Universe 2021 pageant, which was held in Eilat, Israel.

During the Gaza war, she served as a combat medic for about 150 days and then engaged in advocacy for the State of Israel voluntarily mainly in the United States and Canada.

Awards and achievements
Preceded by Tehila Levi	Miss Israel; 2021	Succeeded by Ofir Korsia
