= Rana Raslan =

Arab-Israeli model

Rana Raslan رنا رسلان
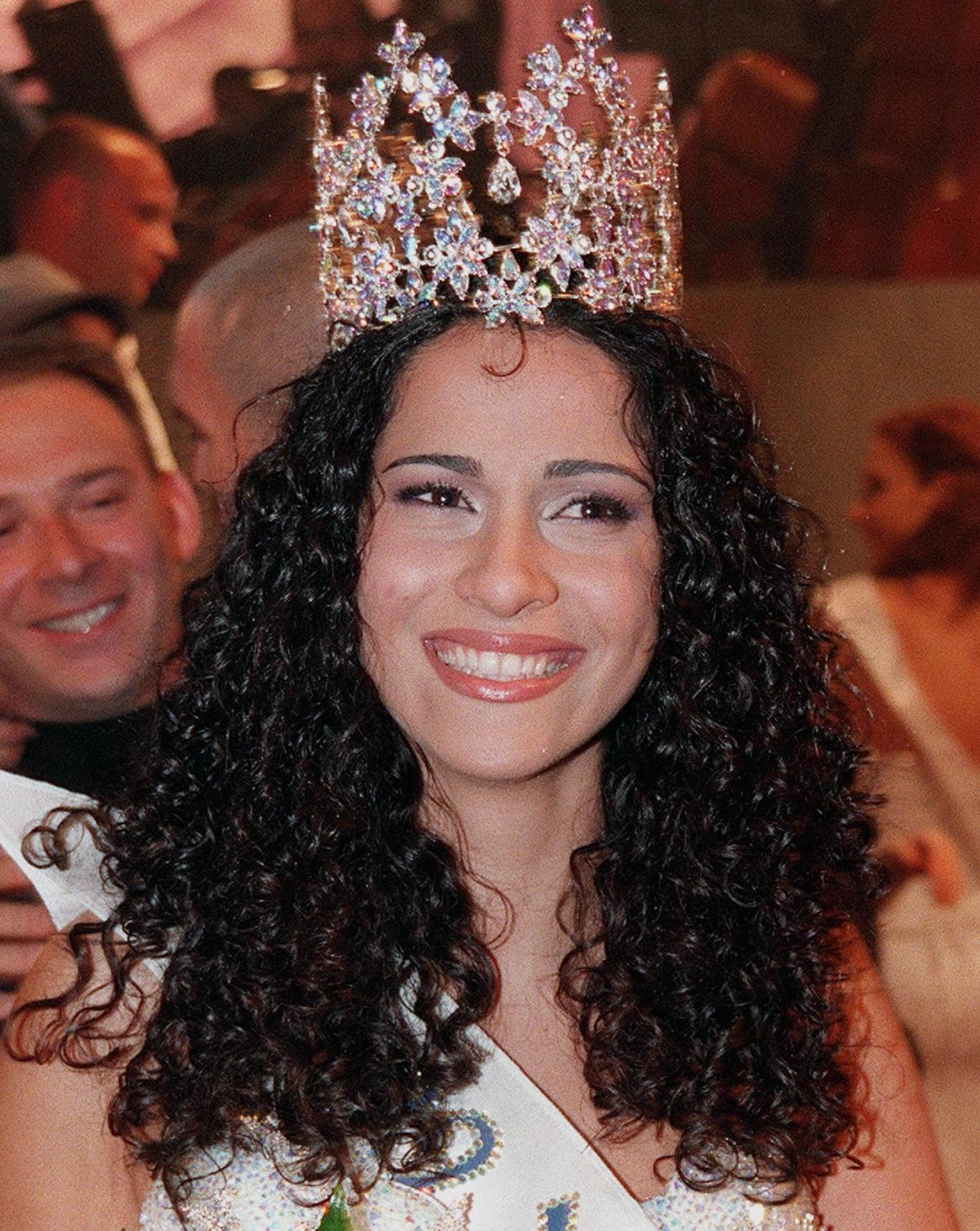
- Raslan after being crowned national beauty queen in Tel Aviv, 9 March 1999
- Born: 17 March 1977 (age 49); Wadi Nisnas, Haifa, Israel
- Occupation: Model (formerly)
- Spouse: Unknown (m. 2003)
- Beauty pageant titleholder
- Hair colour: Black
- Eye colour: Brown
- Major competitions: Miss Israel 1999 (Winner); Miss Universe 1999 (Unplaced)

Rana Raslan (Arabic: رنا رسلان; Hebrew: רנא רסלאן; born 17 March 1977) is an Israeli former model who won Miss Israel in 1999. With the cancellation of the pageant in 2022, she remains the only Arab and Muslim to have won the title. Following her crowning as national beauty queen, Raslan represented Israel at Miss Universe that same year.

Concurrent Israeli prime minister Benjamin Netanyahu hailed Raslan's first-place nomination as a "clear manifestation of equality and cooperation between Jews and Arabs in Israel" and criticized the assertion that Arabs are treated as second-class citizens under Israeli law.

== Early and personal life ==
Raslan was born on 17 March 1977 in Wadi Nisnas, a neighbourhood in the city of Haifa; her father is an Arab Muslim and her mother is an Arab Christian who converted to Islam.

She has described herself as a "secular Muslim" in response to accusations of immorality by Muslim fundamentalists—specifically in reference to the beauty pageants' usage of swimsuits.

In 2003, Raslan relocated to Dubai after her marriage to an Emirati businessman.

== See also ==
- Lucy Aharish, Arab-Israeli journalist and actress
- Huda Naccache, Arab-Israeli model
- Lucy Ayoub, Arab-Israeli journalist
- Mira Awad, Arab-Israeli musical artist
