= Huda Naccache =

Arab-Israeli model

- הודא נקאש
- Born: Haifa, Israel
- Occupations: Model, beauty pageant titleholder
- Known for: First Arab model to appear on the cover of an Arabic language magazine in a bikini; Israel's representative at the Miss Earth 2011 pageant; Contestant on Israel's Survivor (Season 7)
- Height: 6 ft (1.8 m)
- Spouse: Roey Mula (m. 2018)

Huda Naccache (or Huda Nakash, Arabic: هدى نقاش, Hebrew: הודא נקאש) is an Israeli model and beauty pageant titleholder. She was the first Arab model to appear on the cover of an Arabic language magazine in a bikini and was Israel's representative to the Miss Earth 2011 beauty pageant in Philippines in December 2011.

Naccache was one of the contestants on Israel's Survivor seventh season. She made it to the last 7.

Naccache is nearly 6 feet (1.8 m) tall and was born in the city of Haifa in northern Israel.

Born to an Arab-Christian family, her role as a swimsuit model has stimulated controversy from the Arab community.

In 2018, she married Jewish-Israeli musician and sound recordist Roey Mula.

== See also ==
- Miss Earth 2011 § Contestants
- Rana Raslan
- Lucy Ayoub
- Mira Awad
- Lucy Aharish
