= Doron Matalon =

Israeli beauty pageant titleholder (born 1993)

Doron Matalon דורון מטלון
- Born: Doron Matalon; 20 May 1993 (age 33); Beit Aryeh-Ofarim, West Bank
- Height: 1.75 m (5 ft 9 in)
- Beauty pageant titleholder
- Title: Miss Israel 2014 (Winner for Miss Universe)
- Hair color: Brown
- Eye color: Green
- Major competitions: Miss Israel 2014 (Winner for Miss Universe); Miss Universe 2014 (Unplaced)

Doron Matalon (Hebrew: דורון מטלון; born 20 May 1993) is an Israeli beauty pageant titleholder who won the title of Miss Israel 2014 for Miss Universe 2014. She represented her country at the Miss Universe 2014 pageant.

== Personal life ==
Doron Matalon was born and raised in Beit Aryeh-Ofarim. Her father is a manager at IBM and her mother is a kindergarten teacher. The meaning of her name is "gift" in both Hebrew and Greek. She served as a sergeant in the Northern Command of the Israeli army.

In December 2011, Matalon gained national publicity after a sex segregation incident on a Jerusalem bus. She said a 45-year-old Haredi man demanded she move to the back of the bus, threatening her and calling her a prostitute, but she refused. The incident was covered extensively by the Israeli media, and she became a symbol of women's empowerment. Matalon pressed charges, and the man was later convicted of sexually harassing her.

== Pageantry ==
=== Miss Israel 2014 ===
Matalon was crowned as the Miss Universe Israel 2014 together with Mor Mamman who was crowned as the official Miss Israel at the pageant. The Miss Israel pageant was held at the Congress Center in Haifa.

=== Miss Universe 2014 ===
Matalon competed in the Miss Universe 2014 pageant and finished unplaced.

== See also ==
- Israeli fashion

Awards and achievements
Preceded by Yityish Titi Aynaw	Miss Israel; 2014	Succeeded by Avigail Alfatov
