= Danielle Yablonka =

American beauty pageant titleholder

Danielle Yablonka דניאל יבלונקה
- Born: Danielle Sophie Yablonka; 3 December 2000 (age 25); Miami, Florida, U.S
- Education: Florida Atlantic University
- Beauty pageant titleholder
- Title: Miss Universe Israel 2026
- Major competitions: Miss Israel 2025; (1st Runner-Up); Miss Universe 2026; (TBD)
- Website: www.danielleyablonka.com

Danielle Sophie Yablonka (born in 3 December 2000) is an American beauty pageant titleholder who won the title of Miss Universe Israel 2026. She will represent Israel at Miss Universe 2026 in San Juan, Puerto Rico.

== Early life and education ==
Danielle Yablonka was born and raised in Miami, Florida. She is of Jewish descent; her grandparents were Holocaust survivors from the Łódź region of Poland.

Yablonka completed her secondary education at Design and Architecture Senior High School, focusing on fine arts and fashion design, from 2015 to 2019. She briefly studied community art at the California College of the Arts in 2019–2020 before transferring to Florida Atlantic University. At FAU, she majored in communication studies and graduated with a bachelor's degree in 2023.

== Pageantry ==
=== Miss Israel 2025 ===
Yablonka competed as Miss Herzliya 2025 in the Miss Israel 2025 held in Miami. She went on to finish as the first runner-up.

=== Miss Universe 2026 ===
The following year, the organizers did not hold the contest due to the conflict in the Middle East. Yablonka was subsequently officially appointed to hold the title of Miss Universe Israel 2026 and will represent Israel at Miss Universe 2026 in San Juan, Puerto Rico.

Awards and achievements
Preceded by Melanie Shiraz	Miss Universe Israel; 2026	Incumbent
