= Michal Har'el =

Israeli women's rights activist

- מיכל מודעי
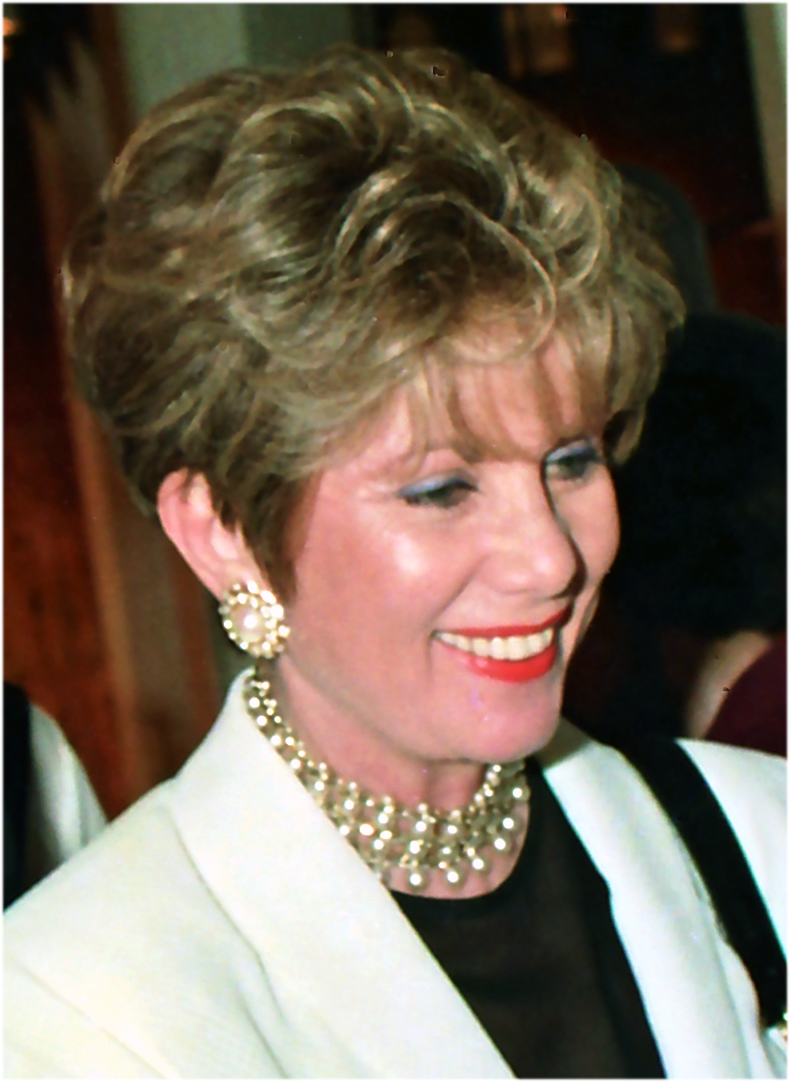
- Michal Har'el
- Born: Michal Herison; 1931; Jerusalem, Mandatory Palestine
- Died: 2 March 2012 (aged 80–81); Israel
- Other name: Michal Moda'i
- Title: Miss Israel 1951
- Spouse: Yitzhak Moda'i
- Children: Harela Moda'i; Boaz Moda'i; Galia Moda'i

Michal Har'el (Hebrew: מיכל מודעי; née Herison; 1931 – 2 March 2012), was the second Miss Israel, a women's rights activist, and one of three lifetime honorary presidents of Women's International Zionist Organization.

== Biography ==
Michal Herison (later Har'el) was a seventh generation Jerusalemite born to Zipporah Salomon and Osher Samuel Zelman Herison. She was a relative of Yoel Moshe Salomon. Har'el attended Evelina de Rothschild School in Jerusalem and David Yellin College of Education. She was described by The Jewish Daily Forward as a "stalwart defender of the City of David during the 1948 siege of Jerusalem." Har'el married Yitzhak Moda'i in 1953. Together they had three children. Their oldest daughter, Harela, died in an automobile accident when she was 22 years old. Her parents established an annual memorial prize at Army Radio, where she worked. A son, Boaz Moda'i, served as Israel's ambassador to Ireland from 2010 to 2015.

== Fashion career ==
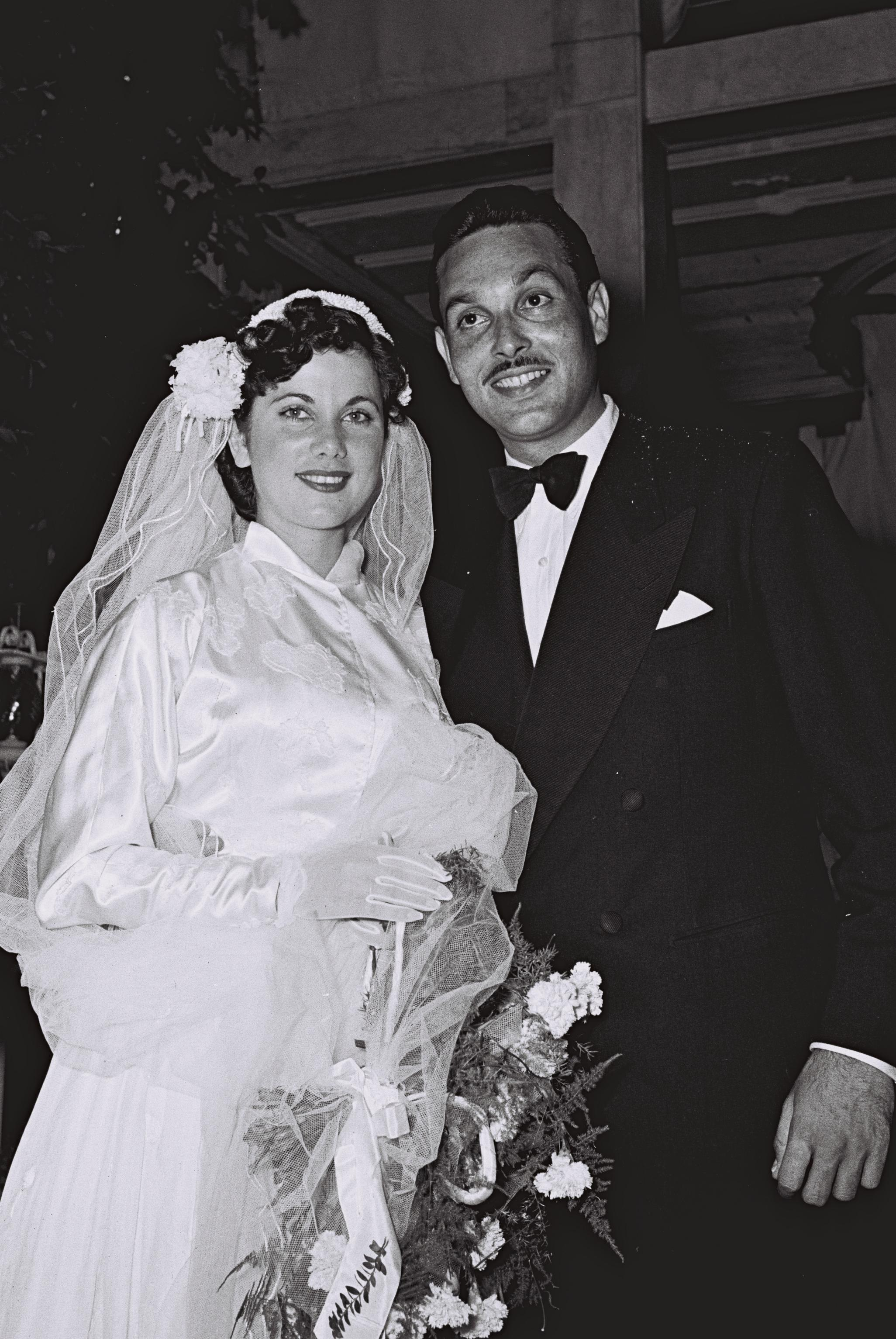
Michal Har'el with her husband, Yitzhak Moda'i

After working as a kindergarten teacher, she became a beauty queen, winning the title of Miss Jerusalem and then Miss Israel. Prime Minister David Ben-Gurion wanted representatives of Israel to have Hebrew names, and so she changed her last name from Herison to Har'el. She travelled the world representing Israel. She toured the United States for two months, raising money for the United Jewish Appeal, and met such dignitaries as the mayor of New York City. One of the places she visited was London and there she met her future husband, Yitzhak Moda'i, a military attache who later entered Israeli politics and became the country's Finance Minister.

== Social activism ==
In 1968 she joined WIZO Herzliya Pituah and soon became its chairwoman. She focused the organization's efforts to assist recent immigrants who were often impoverished and lacking in knowledge of Hebrew or Israel's bureaucracy. After taking on progressively more responsible positions, Moda'i was elected chair of Israel's WIZO. In addition to visiting and supporting WIZO teams in neighboring areas, she decided in 1983 to begin opening up shelters for battered women in response to problems of domestic violence. In order to secure better funding for WIZO's youth programs and facilities, she lobbied the Ministries of Finance and Education. She was elected World WIZO's fourth president in 1996 and held that position until she became chair of the Council of Women's Organizations in 2004.

Moda'i was a member of the World Jewish Congress and served on the Jewish Agency's Board of Governors. She received the Prime Minister's Shield of Volunteerism Award 1999 in recognition of her non-profit leadership and contributions. In 2004 she was named an honorary citizen of Tel Aviv.

== Published works ==
- "Beauty Queen's Diary" (1983)

8

Awards and achievements
| Preceded by Miriam Yaron (Jaross) | Miss Israel; 1951 | Succeeded by Ora Vered (Gamily) |

== See also ==
- Women of Israel
