= Rina Mor =

Israeli lawyer and former Miss Universe (born 1956)

Rina Mor רינה מור-גודר
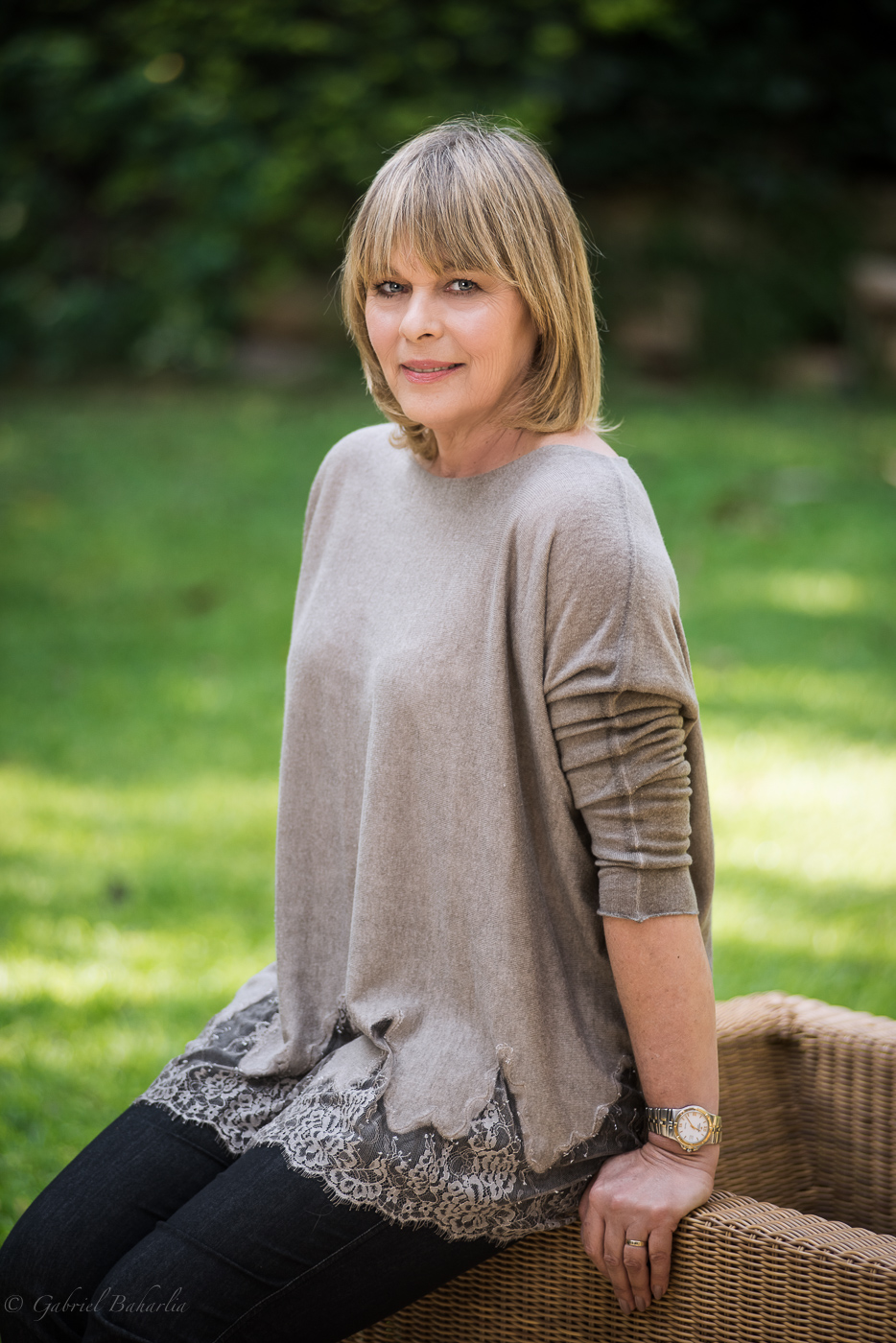
- Mor-Goder in 2015
- Born: Rina Messinger; February 16, 1956 (age 70); Kiryat Tiv'on, Israel
- Spouse: Doron Goder (m. 1982)
- Children: 2
- Beauty pageant titleholder
- Title: Malkat HaYofi 1976; Miss Universe 1976
- Hair color: Dark blonde
- Eye color: Blue

Rina Mor-Goder (Hebrew: רינה מור-גודר; née Messinger; February 16, 1956) is an Israeli lawyer, writer and beauty queen who was crowned Miss Universe 1976.

== Biography ==
Rina Goder (née Messinger) was born in Kiryat Tiv'on, near Haifa. Her father was a mechanic and pilot in the Israeli Air Force and her mother was a kindergarten teacher. Rina Mor-Goder became a lawyer and mother of two daughters.

== Beauty queen ==
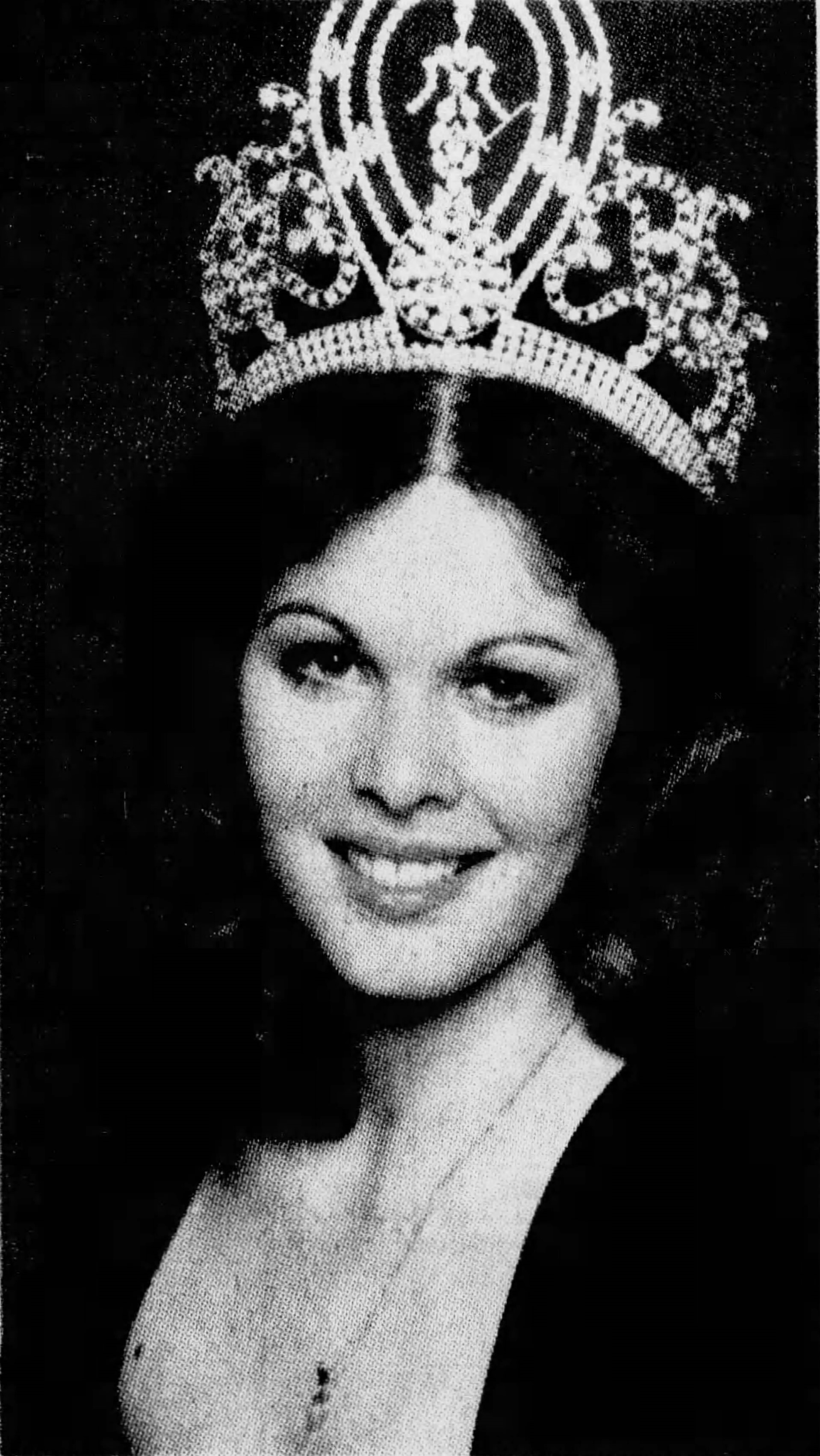
Wearing the Miss Universe crown in 1977

She was the first and only Miss Israel ever to win the Miss Universe crown.

In 1989 and 2004, she was a judge in the Miss Israel competition.

In 1981, she wrote a book on her experience as Miss Universe.

After her reign as Miss Universe, Messinger worked in public relations for the Jewish Agency and Israel Bonds in New York. After four years, she returned to Israel and continued working in public relations for a private company. There, she met her husband, with whom she has two daughters.

On December 12, 2021, Rina was part of Miss Universe 2021 Selection Committee Members during the Preliminary Competition.

== Legal career ==
In 1991, she began studying law at Tel Aviv University. After completing her bachelor's degree with honours, the family left for the Netherlands. She completed her master's degree there, specializing in family law. In 2002, after six years in the Netherlands, the family returned to Israel. Mor-Godor is a lawyer in Tel Aviv, working on her doctorate and appearing every week on the morning show of Channel 10, where she gives advice on family law.

== See also ==
- Women in Israel

Awards and achievements
Preceded by (Finland) Anne Marie Pohtamo	Miss Universe; 1976	Succeeded by (Trinidad and Tobago) Janelle Commissiong
Preceded by Orit Cooper	Miss Israel; 1976	Succeeded by Zehava Vardi
