= Mor Maman (beauty queen) =

Israeli businesswoman

Mor Maman מור ממן
- Born: July 30, 1995 (age 31); Beersheba, Israel
- Spouse: Yisrael Frank Amsalem (m. 2018–2022)
- Children: 2
- Beauty pageant titleholder
- Title: Miss Israel 2014

Mor Maman (Hebrew: מור ממן; born July 30, 1995) is an Israeli businesswoman, former model and beauty pageant titleholder. She was crowned Miss Israel 2014 and represented her country at the Miss World 2014 beauty pageant but did not place.

== Early life and education ==
Maman is from Beersheba, Israel, to Israeli-born parents of Moroccan Jewish descent. Her mother, Ilana, won the Miss Beersheba competition when she was younger.

In 2014, Maman was studying computer graphics in high school. After the contest, she was enlisted as soldier to the Israeli Air Force.

== Career ==
Maman revealed in an interview that she embraces Orthodox Judaism in 2016.

Maman was engaged to French-Jewish businessman Yisrael Frank Amsalem, himself a Baal teshuva in November 2017, and they were married in January 2018. She had her son in June 2018, and her daughter in September 2021. They got divorced in February 2022.
