= Shani Hazan =

Israeli model and singer and Miss Israel 2012 (born 1992)

Shani Hazan שני חזן
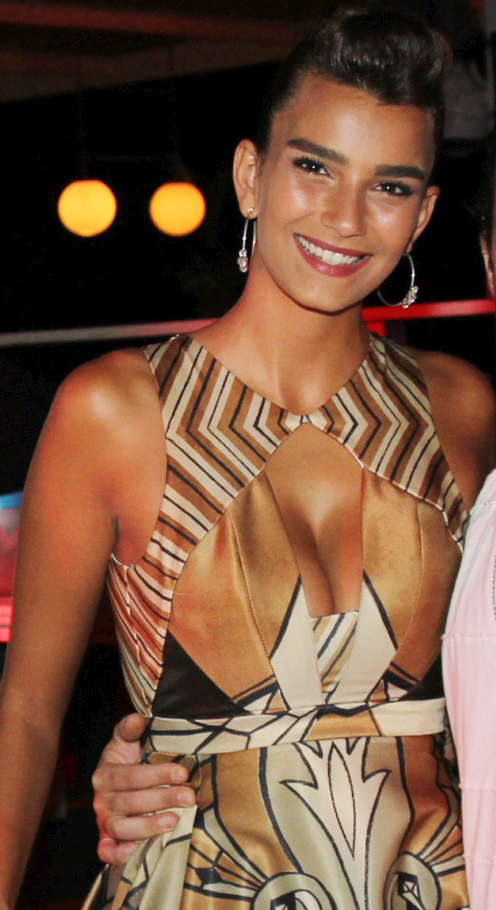
- Hazan in 2016
- Born: September 15, 1992 (age 34); Kiryat Ata, Israel
- Height: 1.82 m (5 ft 11 1/2 in)
- Beauty pageant titleholder
- Title: Miss Israel 2012 (Israel’s Beauty Queen 2012)
- Hair color: Light brown
- Eye color: Brown
- Major competitions: Miss Israel 2012 (winner)

Shani Hazan (Hebrew: שני חזן; born September 15, 1992) is an Israeli model, singer and beauty pageant titleholder who was crowned Miss Israel 2012 and subsequently competed in the Miss World 2012 pageant representing her homeland. She also represented Israel at Miss International 2014. Thus, Hazan is the only Miss Israel who represented her country in two worldwide beauty pageants.

Hazan was born in Israel, and raised in the city of Kiryat Ata, to a family of Moroccan Jewish descent.

She was a 19-year-old sailor serving in the Israeli Navy of the Israel Defense Forces, when she participated in the contest earning her the Miss Israel title.
