= Miss Israel =

Beauty pageant (since 1950)

Miss Israel מלכת היופי
- Type: Beauty pageant
- Parent organization: LaIsha, 1950–2021: (National Miss Israel competition); Edgar Entertainment 2024–2026: (Miss Universe Israel license-holder)
- Headquarters: Miami, Florida
- Qualifies for: Miss Universe (as of 2024)
- First edition: 1950; 76 years ago
- Franchise holder: Edgar Saakyan
- President: Joseph Shine
- Website: missisrael.org

Miss Israel (also referred to as Hebrew: מיס ישראל, Malkat HaYōfî, lit. 'The Beauty Queen') is a national beauty pageant in Israel. The pageant was founded in 1950 and the winners were sent to international pageants such as Miss Universe and Miss World.

== History ==
In the late 1920s, a "Queen Esther Beauty Pageant" was held in Tel Aviv, centred on the holiday of Purim. The first Miss Israel took place in 1950, two years after Israel's independence.

From then onwards, Miss Israel was the national franchise holder for Miss World, Miss Universe, and Miss International. The pageant's official winner represented Israel at Miss World and or Miss Universe and the runners-up at Miss International, and Miss Europe.

In 2022, the original organizers (LaIsha) cancelled the pageant amid controversies over its relevance to modern social standards. It was then restarted under new management, and in 2024, the Miss Universe Israel pageant was organized by Edgar Saakyan, owner of Edgar Entertainment.

== Controversy under Edgar Entertainment ==
In June 2026, the Miss Israel Organization became the subject of public controversy after reigning titleholder Melanie Shiraz alleged that the 2026 selection process had been predetermined and that no genuine national pageant would take place. One day before the organization's announcement, Shiraz publicly stated on Instagram that Danielle Yablonka would be selected as the winner. Yablonka was announced as the organization's representative the following day after the organization stated that, due to the ongoing war, it would not hold a national pageant and instead had appointed its representative directly. The controversy followed broader criticism of changes to the competition under the new franchise holder, Edgar Entertainment, which owns the license for Miss Universe Armenia and Uzbekistan as well. Since becoming the license-holder for the Israel franchise in 2024, Edgar Entertainment held the Miss Israel pageant in Miami, Florida, both in 2024 and 2025, rather than Israel, and applications were opened to non-Israeli Jews from the diaspora. In a statement, the organization, which is partly managed by Edgar Entertainment, falsely claimed that Miss Israel LLC is an Israeli company, despite Florida state filings showing that the production company Edgar Entertainment and a company in Puerto Rico manage Miss Israel LLC, which was set up in 2025.

Prior to the announcement of the 2026 titleholder, several media outlets reported on a recording in which an Edgar Entertainment producer described a process designed to "look like a pageant" and discussed creating a surprise crowning moment despite there being no competitive selection process. The Algemeiner reported that attorneys for the organization acknowledged awareness of the recording but did not dispute its authenticity, instead stating that they were considering legal action over the recording itself.

Shiraz also alleged intimidation, financial extortion, and abusive treatment by the organization's leadership, and denounced ties with the organization. Her criticism of the organization's explanation for cancelling the pageant drew attention because the appointment occurred during a period in which other large-scale public events in Israel, including the 2026 Maccabiah Games, were proceeding.

== Pageant rules ==
As part of reforms introduced in the early 2020s, eligibility requirements for Miss Israel were expanded. Contestants must be at least 18 years old and hold Israeli citizenship. Restrictions related to marital status, motherhood, height, and weight were removed, allowing married and divorced women, as well as mothers, to participate. Candidates must not have a criminal record or be associated with explicit or erotic content. Since Edgar Entertainment's acquisition of the license, eligibility was controversially opened to all Jewish women globally, even if they did not possess Israeli citizenship.

== International crowns ==
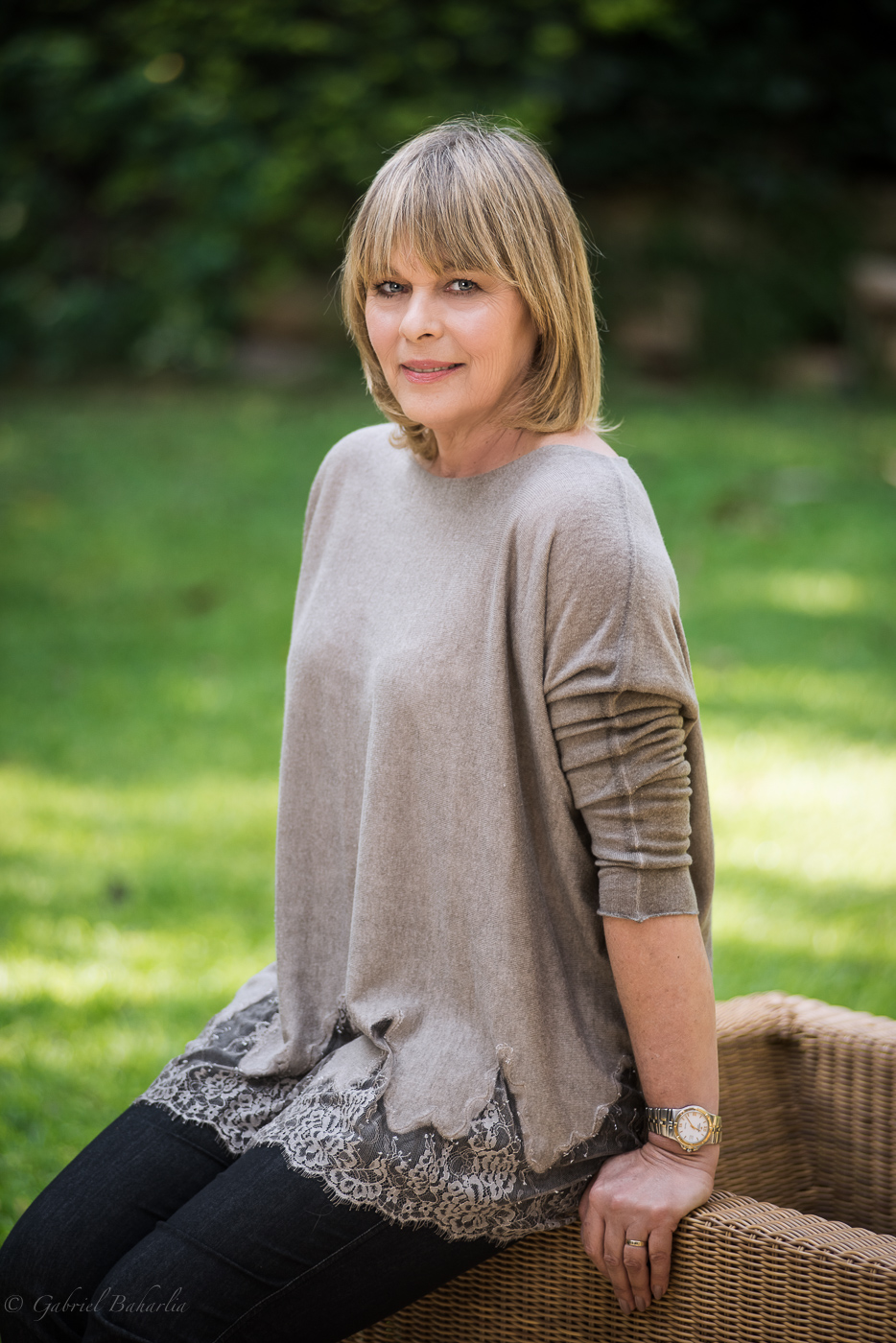
Rina Mor
winner
Miss Universe 1976

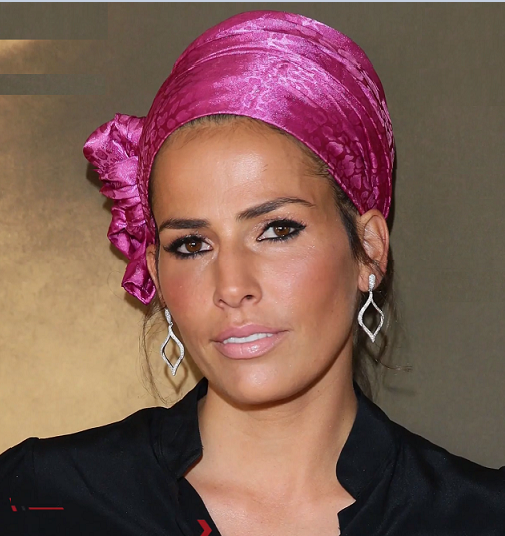
Linor Abargil
winner
Miss World 1998
- Miss Europe 1994 – Lilach Ben-Simon
- Miss Asia Pacific International:
  - Nurit Mizrachi (winner, 1985)
  - Tali Ben-Harush (winner, 1992)

=== Grand slam franchise holders ===
- Miss Universe (1952–2022; 2024—present) — Edgar Saakyan (2024—present)
- Miss World (1952–2017)
- Miss International (1960–2005)
- Miss Earth (2003–2009)

== Track records ==
=== Miss Universe ===
On 20 July 2021, Miss Universe confirmed that the competition would be held in the Israeli city of Eilat in December 2021.

=== Winners ===
- 1951 – Michal Harʾel, former honorary president of the Women's International Zionist Organization and member of the World Jewish Congress
- 1958 – Miriam Hadar, finalist at Miss Universe
- 1999 – Rana Raslan, first Arab and Muslim to win the title
- 2004 – Gal Gadot, actress
- 2005 – Elena Ralph, first winner to be placed at Miss Universe since 2001
- 2013 – Yityish Titi Aynaw, first Ethiopian Jew to win the title

=== Audience favorites ===
In some years, spectators at home were able to choose their favorite contestant by SMS:

- 2000 – Nirit Bakshi
- 2003 – Shahar Nehorai
- 2004 – Keren Friedman
- 2005 – Jennifer Bop
- 2008 – Shunit Faragi
- 2018 – Emma Eytan
- 2019 – Maya Barsheshet
- 2020 – Tali Krasnopolski
- 2021 – Alin Gurevich

=== Hosts ===
- Shaike Ophir (1954)
- Alexander Yahalomi (1957)
- Uri Zohar (1960)
- Rivka Michaeli (1963, 1965, 1989)
- Meni Peer (1972, 1973)
- Dudu Topaz (1991)
- Hanny Nahmias (1992, 1993)
- Mike Burstyn (1992)
- Sapir Koffman (1993)
- Miki Kam (1994)
- Gilat Ankori (1996)
- Noa Tishby (1997, 1998)
- Alon Reinhorn (1998)
- Lion Rosenberg (1999)
- Yael Abecassis (2000)
- Aki Avni (2001, 2002)
- Yael Bar Zohar (2004)
- Orna Datz (2005)
- Raz Meirman (2005)
- Orna Datz (2006)
- Galit Gutmann (2007, 2008, 2009)
- Guy Zu-Aretz (2009
- Hilla Nachshon (2010, 2011)
- Ilanit Levi (2014)
- Titi Aynaw (2016)
- Shani Hazan (2017)
- Reef Neeman (2021)

=== Judges ===
- Binyamin Gibli (1973)
- Lea Gottlieb (1973)
- Ora Namir (1989)
- Rina Mor (1989, 2004))
- Dorit Jellinek (1997)
- Galit Gutmann (2001)
- Judy Shalom Nir-Mozes (2003)
- Ronit Yudkevitz (2005)
- Judy Shalom Nir-Mozes (2005)
- Michal Yannai (2007)
- Yael Goldman (2008)
- Sivan Klein (2008)
- Yael Bar Zohar (2011)
- Michaela Bercu (2012)
- Sivan Klein (2012)

=== Venue ===
- International Convention Center
- Menora Mivtachim Arena
- Cinerama theater
- Haifa International Convention Center

== Titleholders ==
Year	Malkat Hayofi	Birth	Date	Residence / Country	Image
1950	Miriam Yaron	1929	September 30, 1950	Tel Aviv, Israel – Brazil/Germany	
1951	Michal Har'el	1931	September 23, 1951	Herzliya, Israel	
1952	Ora Vered	1934	May 25, 1952	Tel Aviv, Israel – Fort Lauderdale, United States	
1953	Chavatzelet Dror	1934	July 22, 1953	Tel Aviv, Israel – Austria	
1954	Aviva Pe'er	1935	June 25, 1954	Tel Aviv, Israel – Brazil/Romania	
1955	Ilana Carmel	1935	June 25, 1955	Tel Aviv, Israel – China	
1956	Sara Tal	1936	June 14, 1956	Tel Aviv, Israel – New York City, United States	
1957	Atara Barzely	1939	June 6, 1957	Tel Aviv, Israel	
1958	Miriam Hadar	1937	May 22, 1958	Tel Aviv, Israel – New York City, United States	
1959	Rina Yitzchakov	1940	June 16, 1959	Tel Aviv, Israel – New York City, United States	
1960	Aliza Gur	1940	May 29, 1960	Haifa, Israel – Los Angeles, United States	
1961	Dalia Lion	1943	May 30, 1961	Haifa, Israel – Luxembourg	
1962	Yehudit Mazor	1943	June 9, 1962	Haifa, Israel – New York City, United States	
1963	Ester Kfir	1944	May 30, 1963	Tel Aviv, Israel – China	
1964	Ronit Rinat	1946	N/A	Haifa, Israel – Los Angeles, United States	
1965	Aliza Sadeh	1946	June 9, 165	Tel Aviv, Israel – New York City, United States	
1966	Aviva Israeli	1947	May 18, 1966	Tel Aviv, Israel – Italy/Los Angeles, United States	
1967	Batia Kabiri	1948	June 29, 1967	Tel Aviv, Israel	
1968	Miri Zamir	1950	May 28, 1968	Haifa, Israel	
1969	Chava Levy	1951	May 13, 1969	Haifa, Israel	
1970	Moshit Tsiporin	1949	April 9, 1970	Netanya, Israel	
1971	Ester Orgad	1953	May 4, 1971	Eilat, Israel – South Africa	
1972	Ilana Goren	1953	June 6, 1972	Kiryat Motzkin, Israel – New York City, United States	
1973	Limor Schreibman-Sharir	1954	May 22, 1973	Tel Aviv, Israel	
1974	Edna Levy	1955	June 5, 1974	Ashkelon/Rishon Lezion, Israel	
1975	Orit Cooper	1956	May 20, 1975	Tel Aviv, Israel	
1976	Rina Mor (née Messenger); Miss Universe 1976	1956	May 25, 1976	Kiryat Tivon, Israel	
1977	Zehava Vardi	1956	May 3, 1977	Kiryat Bialik, Israel	
1978	Dorit Jellinek	1958	May 30, 1978	Haifa, Israel	
1979	Vered Polgar	1962	May 22, 1979	Mitzpa, Israel	
1980	Illana Shoshan	1961	April 14, 1980	Kfar Saba, Israel – Los Angeles, United States	
1981	Dana Wexler	1964	April 7, 1981	Giv'atayim, Israel	
1982	Deborah Hess	1963	May 5, 1982	Tel Aviv, Israel – United States	
1983	Shim'ona Hollander	1965	April 26, 1983	Tel Aviv, Israel	
1984	Sapir Koffmann	1965	May 22, 1984	Petah Tikva, Israel	
1985	Hilla Kelmann	1966	May 14, 1985	Holon, Israel	
1986	Nilly Drucker	1968	May 20, 1986	Beersheba/Tel Aviv, Israel	
1987	Yamit Noy	1969	March 3, 1987	Rishon Lezion/Moshav in Sharon plain, Israel	
1988	Shirley Ben-Mordechai	1971	March 15, 1988	Tel Aviv, Israel	
1989	Nicole Halperin	1970	February 21, 1989	Tel Aviv, Israel – United States	
1990	Yvonna Krugliak	1971	February 27, 1990	Tel Aviv, Israel – Latvia	
1991	Miri Goldfarb	1970	April 23, 1991	Hod Hasharon, Israel	
1992	Ravit Asaf	1974	April 5, 1992	Beer Sheva, Israel	
1993	Jana Khodirker	1973	March 2, 1993	Rehovot, Israel – Ukraine	
1994	Ravit Yarkoni	1973	March 2, 1994	Giv'atayim, Israel	
1995	Jana Kalmann	1975	March 29, 1995	Tel Aviv, Israel – Siberia, Russia	
1996	Taly [Talia] Lewenthal	1978	March 18, 1996	Haifa, Israel	
1997	Mirit Greenberg	1979	March 10, 1997	Beersheba, Israel	
1998	Linor Abargil; Miss World 1998	1980	March 24, 1998	Netanya/Tel Aviv, Israel	
1999	Rana Raslan	1977	March 9, 1999	Haifa, Israel	
2000	Nirit Bakshi	1982	March 30, 2000	Beer Sheva, Israel	
2001	Ilanit Levi	1982	March 21, 2001	Haifa, Israel	
2002	Yamit Har-Noy	1982	March 13, 2002	Oranit, Israel	
2003	Sivan Klein	1984	April 1, 2003	Tel Aviv, Israel	
2004	Gal Gadot	1985	March 22, 2004	Petah Tikva/Tel Aviv, Israel	
2005	Elena Ralph	1983	April 6, 2005	Ramat Gan, Israel – Ukraine	
2006	Yael Nizri	1988	March 21, 2006	Kiryat Shmona, Israel	
2007	Liran Kohener	1988	March 13, 2007	Rishon Lezion, Israel	
2008	Tamar Ziskind	1985	March 27, 2008	Haifa, Israel	
2009	Adi Rodnitzky	1989	March 18, 2009	Tel Aviv, Israel	
2010	Shavit Wiesel	1990	March 8, 2010	Kibbutz Be'eri, Israel	
2011	Ella Ran	1989	March 30, 2011	Herzliya, Israel	
2012	Shani Hazan	1992	March 7, 2012	Kiryat Ata, Israel	
2013	Yityish Titi Aynaw	1991	February, 2013	Netanya, Israel – Ethiopia	
2014	Mor Maman	1995	March 4, 2014	Beersheba, Israel	
2015	Maayan Keren	1997	June 3, 2015	Ashdod, Israel	
2016	Karin Alia	1998	June 6, 2016	Kiryat Gat, Israel	
2017	Rotem Rabi	1995	May 10, 2017	Tel Aviv, Israel	
2018	Nikol Reznikov	1999	May 1, 2018	Afula, Israel	
2019	Sella Sharlin	1996	March 26, 2019	Herzliya, Israel – Boston, United States	
2020	Tehila Levi	2001	July 13, 2020	Yavne, Israel	
2021	Noa Cochva	1999	October 24, 2021	Yehud, Israel	
Edgar Saakyan directorship — a franchise holder to Miss Universe from 2024.
2024	Ofir Korsia	2000	September 29, 2024	Rishon LeZion, Israel	
2025	Melanie Shiraz	1998	July 18, 2025	Tel Aviv, Israel	
2026	Danielle Yablonka	2000	July 1, 2026	Miami, Florida	

== Categories ==
Winner International Title
Miss Universe Israel
Miss World Israel
Miss International Israel
Miss Europe Israel
Miss Earth Israel
Miss Asia Pacific Israel
Miss Young Israel

=== 1950–1959 ===
The Miss Israel divided into five categories; "Malkat Hayofi" - Israel's Beauty Queen (IBQ) is usually for the main winner, "Na'arat Israel" – Israel's Maiden of Beauty (IMB) is for a second place, "Malkat Hachen" - Israel's Queen of Grace (IQG) is for a third place, "Malkat Hayofi-Esreh" - Israel's Teen Queen (ITQ) is for fourth place and "Nesichat Hayofi" - Israel's Princess of Beauty (IPB) is for the last of Top 5 Miss Israel which means a fifth place. These titles represent Israel at International competitions such as Miss Universe, Miss World, Miss International, Miss Europe, Miss Earth and other minor pageants.

Year	Malkat Hayofi	First Runner-up	Second Runner-up
1950	Miriam Yaron	Carmela Fargi	Yaffa Schpitzer
1951	Michal Har'el	No Runners-up	
1952	Ora Vered	No Runners-up	
1953	Chavatzelet Dror	Miriam Gershoni	Viorika Artzman
1954	Aviva Pe'er	No Runners-up	
1955	Ilana Carmel	Miriam Kotler	Varda Cohen
1956	Sara Tal	Rina Weiss	Tzipora A'haronovitz
1957	Atara Barzely	Sara Elimor	Yaffa Raich
1958	Miriam Hadar	Ilana Shani	Dafna Adir
1959	Rina Yitzchakov	Ziva Shomrat	Diana Gubernik

=== 1960–2021 ===
Year	Malkat Hayofi	Na'arat Israel	Malkat Hachen	Malkat Hayofi-Esreh	Nesichat Hayofi
1960	Aliza Gur	Shulamit Shavit	Debuted 1963	Debuted 1971	Debuted 1979
1961	Dalia Lion	Rina Kishon	Debuted 1963	Debuted 1971	Debuted 1979
1962	Jehudit Mazor	Nurit Ne'eman	Debuted 1963	Debuted 1971	Debuted 1979
1963	Ester Kfir	Sherin Ibrahim	Sara Talmi	Debuted 1971	Debuted 1979
1964	Ronit Rinat	Ofira Margalit	Jehudit Peri	Debuted 1971	Debuted 1979
1965	Aliza Sadeh	Iris Bar-Or	Shlomit Gat	Debuted 1971	Debuted 1979
1966	Aviva Israeli	Yaffa Sharir	Segula Gohr	Debuted 1971	Debuted 1979
1967	Batia Kabiri	Dalia Regev	Daniela Hod	Debuted 1971	Debuted 1979
1968	Miri Zamir	Miriam Peri	Sara Dvir	Debuted 1971	Debuted 1979
1969	Chava Levy	Tehila Selah	Orit Peleg	Debuted 1971	Debuted 1979
1970	Moshit Tsiporin	Irit Lavi	Miri Katz	Debuted 1971	Debuted 1979
1971	Ester Orgad	Miri Ben-David	Pnina Alon	Orly Goren	Debuted 1979
1972	Ilana Goren	Hanna Urdan	Ronit Gafni	Shoshi Mazor	Debuted 1979
1973	Limor Schreibman-Sharir	Chaja Katzir	Aviva Magor	Elina Paz	Debuted 1979
1974	Edna Levy	Lea Keinan	Nurit Bar	Eva Adar	Debuted 1979
1975	Orit Cooper	Atida Mor	Pazit Li'ad	Pazit Eran	Debuted 1979
1976	Rina Messinger; Miss Universe 1976	Levana Abarbanel	Yif'at Netzer	Nurit Amir	Debuted 1979
1977	Zehava Vardi	Ya'el Hovav	Ronit Makover	Sara Hen	Debuted 1979
1978	Dorit Jellinek	Sari Alon	Lea Avgi	Tammy (Tamar) Liebermann	Debuted 1979
1979	Vered Polgar	Dana Peler	Helly Ben-David	Ronit Ben-Bassat	Racheli Aizenshtadt
1980	Illana Shoshan	Anat Zamir	Irit Altmann	Lea Barkai	Nira Ferder
1981	Dana Wexler	Ninnette Assur	Li'ora Akoka	Sarit Agiv	x
1982	Deborah Hess	Anat Kerem	Nava Hen	Rinat Eldar	Ya'el Milo
1983	Shim'ona Hollander	Yif'at Schechter	Sigal Fogel	Dorit Farkash	Anat Tzachor
1984	Sapir Koffmann	Iris Look	Pazit Cohen	Li'at Cohen	Rinat Hadashi
1985	Hilla Kelmann	Maja Wechtenhaim	Avivit Nachmany	Nurit Mizrachi; Miss Asia Pacific 1985	x
1986	Nilly Drucker	Osnat Mo'as	Chava Distenfeld	x	Ester Sarid
1987	Yamit Noy	Ya'el Gertler	Ofir Alony	Dafna Ben-Yitzchak	Nirit Elyovich
1988	Shirley Ben-Mordechai	Dganit Cohen	Galit Aharoni	Limor Magen	Revital Mor
1989	Nicole Halperin	Ronit Siton	Limor Fishel	x	Galit Farber
1990	Yvonna Krugliak	Ari'ela Tessler	Ravit Lichtenberg	Miriam Aharonson	Dafna Shahar
1991	Miri Goldfarb	Li'at Ditkovsky	Julia Stern	Orly Al'aluf	Efrat Bruner
1992	Ravit Asaf	Einat Zmora	Sarit Afangar	Ravit Kanfi	x
1993	Jana Khodirker	Tamara Porat	Anat Elimelech	Dana Avrish	Keren Levy
1994	Ravit Yarkoni	Shirley Schwartzberg	Nitzan Kirshenboim	Lilach Ben-Simon; Miss Europe 1994	Natalie Cohen
1995	Jana Kalmann	Miri Bohadana	Michal Shtibel	Ilona Katz	Anat Bibi
1996	Taly Lewenthal	Liraz Mesilaty	Ann Konopny	Kim Roslikov	Keren Schechter
1997	Mirit Greenberg	Dikla Hamdi	Lital Shapira	Alexandra Schwartztokh	Chajki Oster
1998	Linor Abargil; Miss World 1998	Hagit Raz	Galia Abramov	Ya'arit Barzilay	Milana Reznikov
1999	Rana Raslan	Jenny Chervony	Nofit Shevach	Galy Raz	Hen Talala
2000	Nirit Bakshi	Dana Dantes	Dana Farkash	Jasmine Lachovitz	x
2001	Ilanit Levi	Keren Schlimovitz	Dikla Elkabetz	Hanni Mayers	x
2002	Yamit Har-Noy	Karol Lowenstein	Shelly Dina'i	Dina Serby	x
2003	Sivan Klein	Miri Levy	Stavit Budin	Shahar Nehorai	x
2004	Gal Gadot	Rita Lukin	Li'or Keren	Helen Masala	x
2005	Elena Ralph	Keren Shacham	Moran Gerbi	Rinat Dukarker	x
2006	Yael Nizri	Anastasya Yentin	Tehila Mor	Hila Eran	x
2007	Liran Kohener	Sharon Kenent	Tal Gonen	Meital Sadon	x
2008	Tamar Ziskind	Shunit Faragi	No'a Avrahami	Linn Mor	x
2009	Adi Rodnitzky	Yulia Dyment	Noy Michaelov	Gal Erez	x
2010	Shavit Wiesel	Bat-El Jobi	Adaya Zeidman	Adi Sasi	Eden Shukrun
2011	Ella Ran	Kim Edri	Bar Marom	Kim Akafi	Hani Maccabi
2012	Shani Hazan	Lina Machola	May Yoshia	Noy Abner	Suf Azulai
2013	Yityish Titi Aynaw	Bar Hefer	Sabina Yusupova	Hila Balilti	Ofir Kapach
2014	Mor Maman	Doron Matalon	Tamar Skorsirb	Sasha Alexsandra Shuturov	Natalie Prepelitzki
2015	Maayan Keren	Avigail Alfatov	Victoria Khersonsky	Itay Barash	x
2016	Karin Alia	Yam Kaspers Anshel	Naama Deutsch	Shay Berkovich	x
2017	Rotem Rabi	Adar Gandelsman	Noya Ariely	Dana Solomon	x
2018	Nikol Reznikov	Michal Mordov	Emma Eytan	Talleen Abu Hanna	x
2019	Sella Sharlin	Uliana Fridrih	Lior Cohen	Inbar Moscovici	x
2020	Tehila Levi	Tali Krasnopolski	Noa Teomi	Chen Shaul	x
2021	Noa Cochva	Yarin Buzaglo	Alin Gurevich	Ofir Korsia	x

=== 2024–2026 ===
The winner of Miss Universe Israel represents her country at Miss Universe. On occasion, when the winner does not qualify (due to age) a runner-up is sent.

Year	Winner	Runner-up	Date	Venue	Notes
2024	Ofir Korsia	Abigail Kikirov	September 2024	Florida, United States	
2025	Melanie Shiraz	Danielle Yablonka	July 2025	Florida, United States	Severed ties with organization after abuse allegations
2026	Danielle Yablonka	–	July 2026	Florida, United States	Appointed after public controversy of rigging. No pageant held

== Titleholders under Miss Israel org. ==
=== Miss Universe Israel ===
Since 1952, Israel competes at major international pageants. Israel has three international winners namely; Miss Universe 1976, Miss World 1998 and Miss Europe 1994 According to the Miss Israel Organization, traditionally Miss Israel represents the country at Miss Universe. In 2006 Miss Israel changed format with the grand winner competing in the Miss World competition and second place automatically declared "Miss Universe Israel." In 2013, the winner competed in Miss Universe 2013 in Russia. Began in 2018 the format was back to past era; the main winner goes to Miss Universe.

Year	District	Miss Israel	Hebrew Name	Placement at Miss Universe	Special Awards, Notes	Refs
Edgar Saakyan directorship (Edgar Entertainment and Miss Israel LLC) — a franchise holder to Miss Universe from 2024						
2026	Central	Danielle Yablonka	דניאל יבלונקה	TBA	TBA	
2025	Central	Melanie Shiraz	מלאני שירז	Unplaced		
2024	Central	Ofir Korsia	אופיר קורסיה	Unplaced		
LaIsha directorship — a franchise holder to Miss Universe between 1952—2021						
Did not compete since 2022 — 2023
2021	Central	Noa Cochva	נועה כוכבה	Unplaced		
2020	Tel Aviv	Tehila Levi	תהילה לוי	Unplaced		
2019	Northern	Sella Sharlin	סלה שרלין	Unplaced		
2018	Central	Nikol Reznikov	ניקול רזניקוב	Unplaced		
2017	Southern	Adar Gandelsman	אדר גנדלמן	Unplaced		
2016	Tel Aviv	Yam Kaspers Anshel	ים קספר אנשל	Unplaced		
2015	Northern	Avigail Alfatov	אביגיל אלפתוב	Unplaced		
2014	Judea and Samaria Area	Doron Matalon	דורון מטלון	Unplaced		
2013	Haifa	Yityish Titi Aynaw	ייתייש טיטי איינאו	Unplaced		
2012	Haifa	Lina Makhuli	לינה מחולי	Unplaced		
2011	Southern	Kim Edri	קים אדרי	Unplaced		
2010	Tel Aviv	Bat-el Jobi	בת-אל ג'ובי	Unplaced		
2009	Haifa	Julia Dyment	ג'וליה דימנט	Unplaced		
2008	Haifa	Shunit Faragi	שונית פרגי	Unplaced		
2007	Tel Aviv	Sharon Kenett	שרון קנט	Unplaced		
2006	Haifa	Anastacia Entin	אנסטסיה אנטין	Unplaced		
2005	Tel Aviv	Elena Ralph	אלנה ראלף	Top 10		
2004	Haifa	Gal Gadot	גל גדות	Unplaced		
2003	Haifa	Sivan Klein	סיון קליין	Unplaced		
2002	Judea and Samaria Area	Yamit Har-Noy	ימית הר נוי	Unplaced		
2001	Haifa	Ilanit Levi	אילנית לוי	Top 10		
2000	Southern	Nirit Bakshi	נירית בקשי	Unplaced		
1999	Haifa	Rana Raslan	רנה רסלאן	Unplaced		
1998	Tel Aviv	Hagit Raz	חגית רז	Unplaced		
1997	Southern	Dikla Hamdi	דקלה חמדי	Unplaced		
1996	Southern	Liraz Mesilaty	לירז מסילטי	Unplaced		
1995	Tel Aviv	Jana Kalmann	יאנה קלמן	Unplaced		
1994	Tel Aviv	Ravit Yarkoni	רוית ירקוני	Unplaced		
1993	Central	Jana Khodirker	יאנה חודירקר	Unplaced		
1992	Haifa	Einat Zmora	עינת זמורה	Unplaced		
1991	Central	Miri Goldfarb	מירי גולדפרב	Unplaced		
1990	Tel Aviv	Yvonna Krugliak	איבונה קרוגליאק	Unplaced		
1989	Tel Aviv	Nicole Halperin	ניקול הלפרין	Unplaced		
1988	Tel Aviv	Shirley Ben-Mordechai	שירלי בן מרדכי	Unplaced		
1987	Central	Yamit Noy	ימית נוי	Unplaced		
1986	Tel Aviv	Nilly Drucker	נילי דרוקר	Unplaced		
1985	Tel Aviv	Hilla Kelmann	הילה קלמן	Unplaced	Best National Costume (2nd Runner-up)	
1984	Central	Sapir Koffmann	ספיר קופמן	Unplaced		
1983	Tel Aviv	Shim'ona Hollander	שמעונה הולנדר	Unplaced		
1982	Tel Aviv	Deborah Hess	דבורה הס	Unplaced		
1981	Tel Aviv	Dana Wexler	דנה וקסלר	Unplaced		
1980	Central	Illana Shoshan	אילנה שושן	Unplaced		
1979	Northern	Vered Polgar	ורד פולגר	Unplaced		
1978	Haifa	Dorit Jellinek	דורית ילינק	Top 12		
1977	Haifa	Zehava Vardi	זהבה ורדי	Unplaced		
1976	Haifa	Rina Messinger	רינה מסינגר	Miss Universe 1976		
1975	Tel Aviv	Orit Cooper	אורית קופר	Top 12		
1974	Central	Edna Levy	עדנה לוי	Unplaced		
1973	Tel Aviv	Limor Schreibman-Sharir	לימור שרייבמן-שריר	4th Runner Up		
1972	Haifa	Ilana Goren	אילנה גורן	3rd Runner Up		
1971	Southern	Ester Orgad	אסתר אורגד	Top 12	Best Swimsuit	
1970	Central	Moshit Tsiporin	מושית ציפורין	Unplaced		
1969	Haifa	Chava Levy	חוה לוי	3rd Runner Up	Best Swimsuit	
1968	Haifa	Miriam Friedman	מרים פרידמן	Top 15	Best Swimsuit	
1967	Tel Aviv	Batia Kabiri	בתיה כביר	4th Runner Up	Best Swimsuit	
1966	Tel Aviv	Aviva Israeli	אביבה ישראל	4th Runner Up	Best National Costume	
1965	Tel Aviv	Aliza Sadeh	עליזה שדה	Top 15		
1964	Haifa	Ronit Rinat	רונית רינת	2nd Runner Up		
1963	Tel Aviv	Sherin Ibrahim	שרין איברהים	Unplaced	Best National Costume	
1962	Tel Aviv	Yehudit Mazor	יהודית מזור	Top 15	Best National Costume (2nd Runner-up)	
1961	Haifa	Atida Pisanti	עתידה פיזנטי	Top 15		
1960	Haifa	Aliza Gur	עליזה גור	Top 15		
1959	Tel Aviv	Rina Yitzchakov	רינה יצחקוב	Top 15		
1958	Tel Aviv	Miriam Hadar	מרים הדר	Top 15		
1957	Tel Aviv	Atara Barzely	עטרה ברזילי	Unplaced		
1956	Tel Aviv	Sara Tal	שרה טל	Top 15		
1955	Tel Aviv	Ilana Carmel	אילנה קרמל	Unplaced		
1954	Tel Aviv	Aviva Pe'er	אביבה פאר	Unplaced		
1953	Tel Aviv	Chavatzelet Dror	חבצלת דרור	Did not compete		
1952	Tel Aviv	Ora Vered	אורה ורד	Unplaced		

== Rankings in Miss Universe ==
Position	#	Year(s)
Miss Universe	1	1976
Top 5/3	6	1964, 1966, 1967, 1969, 1972, 1973
Top 10/12	5	1971, 1975, 1978, 2001, 2005
Top 15/16	8	1956, 1958, 1959, 1960, 1961, 1962, 1965, 1968

== See also ==
- LaIsha
- Israeli fashion
- Culture of Israel
