= Mass media in Israel =

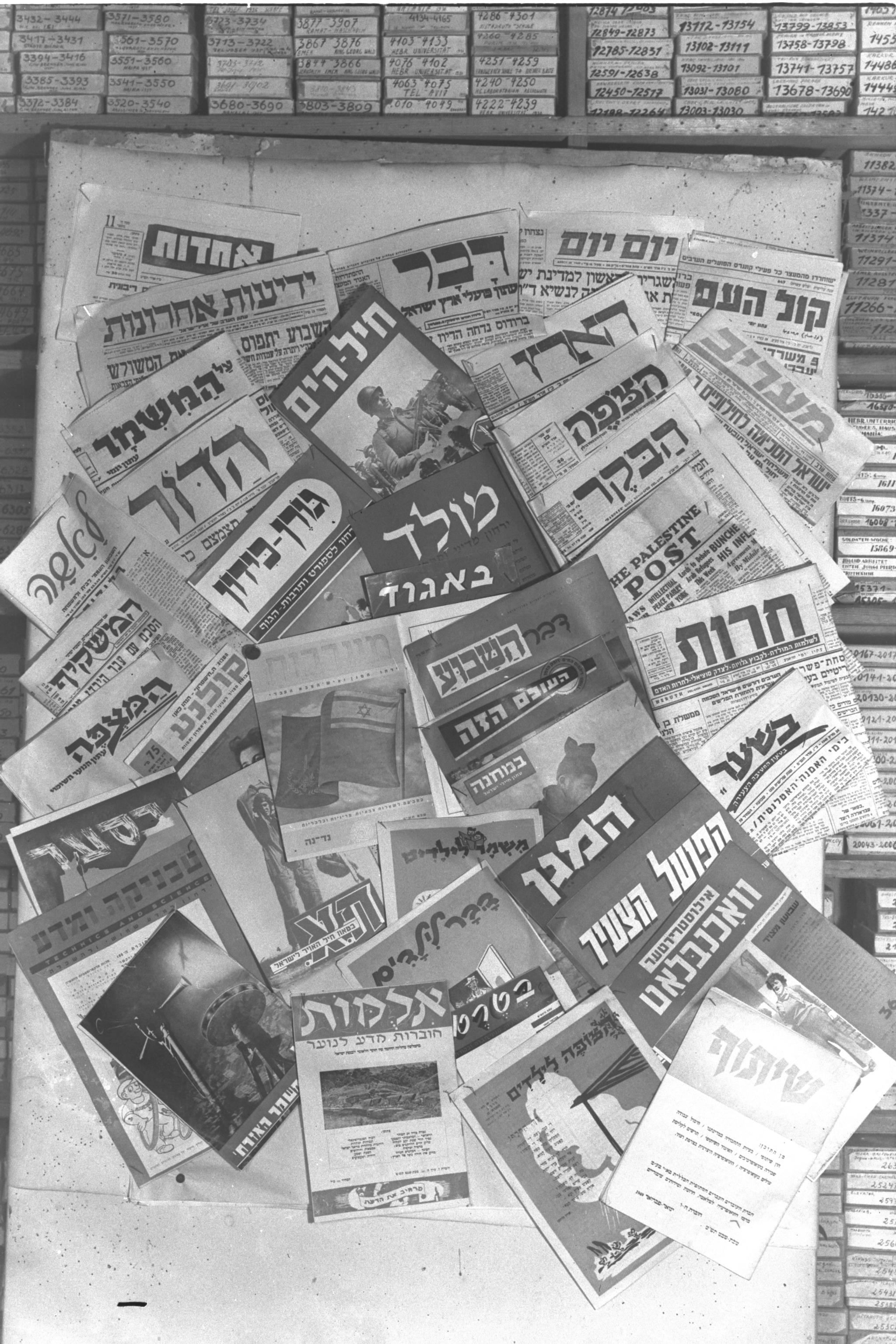
Israeli newspapers in 1949

There are over ten different languages in the Israeli media, with Hebrew as the predominant one. Press in Arabic caters to the Arab citizens of Israel, with readers from areas including those governed by the Palestinian Authority. During the 1980s and 1990s, the Israeli press gradually came to be controlled by a limited number of organizations, whereas the papers published by political parties started to become defunct. Today, three large, privately owned conglomerates based in Tel Aviv dominate the mass media in Israel.

Censorship in Israel is exercised when it is certain that publication of the item in question would harm public safety or national security. When an item is censored, the newspaper may appeal the censor's ruling to a "committee of three," composed of a member of the public (who serves as the chairman), a representative of the army and a representative of the press. The decisions of the committee are binding, and over the years it has in many cases overruled the decision of the censor.

== History ==
Ha-Levanon, the first Hebrew-language newspaper in pre-state Israel, was published on 20 February 1863. It was founded by Yoel Moshe Salomon (later a founder of Petah Tikva) and Michal HaCohen (later a founder of Nahalat Shiv'a). About six months later, another Jerusalem weekly, HaHavatzelet, was founded by Yisrael Bak, who established the first Hebrew printing press in Jerusalem.

An analysis of the press of Palestine under the British Mandate in 1949 states: "Palestine was a special case in journalism. No other area with a population of two million, of whom at least 30 percent are illiterate, could boast of 18 morning dailies, three evening papers, and a host of weeklies, bi-weeklies and monthlies."

In 1952, the International Publishing Company J-M Ltd was established as the state's first book publisher. Censorship was regularly enforced in years after independence, throughout the Yom Kippur War and the 1970s. In 1986, the government allowed for the establishment of private and commercial media outlets to run in competition with state media.

In 2012, Reuters correspondent Tova Cohen described Israeli society as "news-obsessed." Israel has a high newspaper readership rate, due to a combination of high literacy rate and a cultural interest in politics and current affairs. Average weekday readership of newspapers in Israel is around 21 papers per 100 people, although many Israelis end up reading more than one paper.

== Newspapers ==
Newspapers in Israel are mainly published in Hebrew, but there are also newspapers catering to Arabic speakers, and newspapers catering to immigrants speaking a variety of languages, such as Russian, English, and French. In 2022, a TGI survey indicated that Israel Hayom, distributed for free, is Israel's most read newspaper with a 31% weekday readership exposure, followed by Yedioth Ahronoth with 23.9%, Haaretz with 4.7%, and Maariv with 3.5%.

== Freedom of the press ==
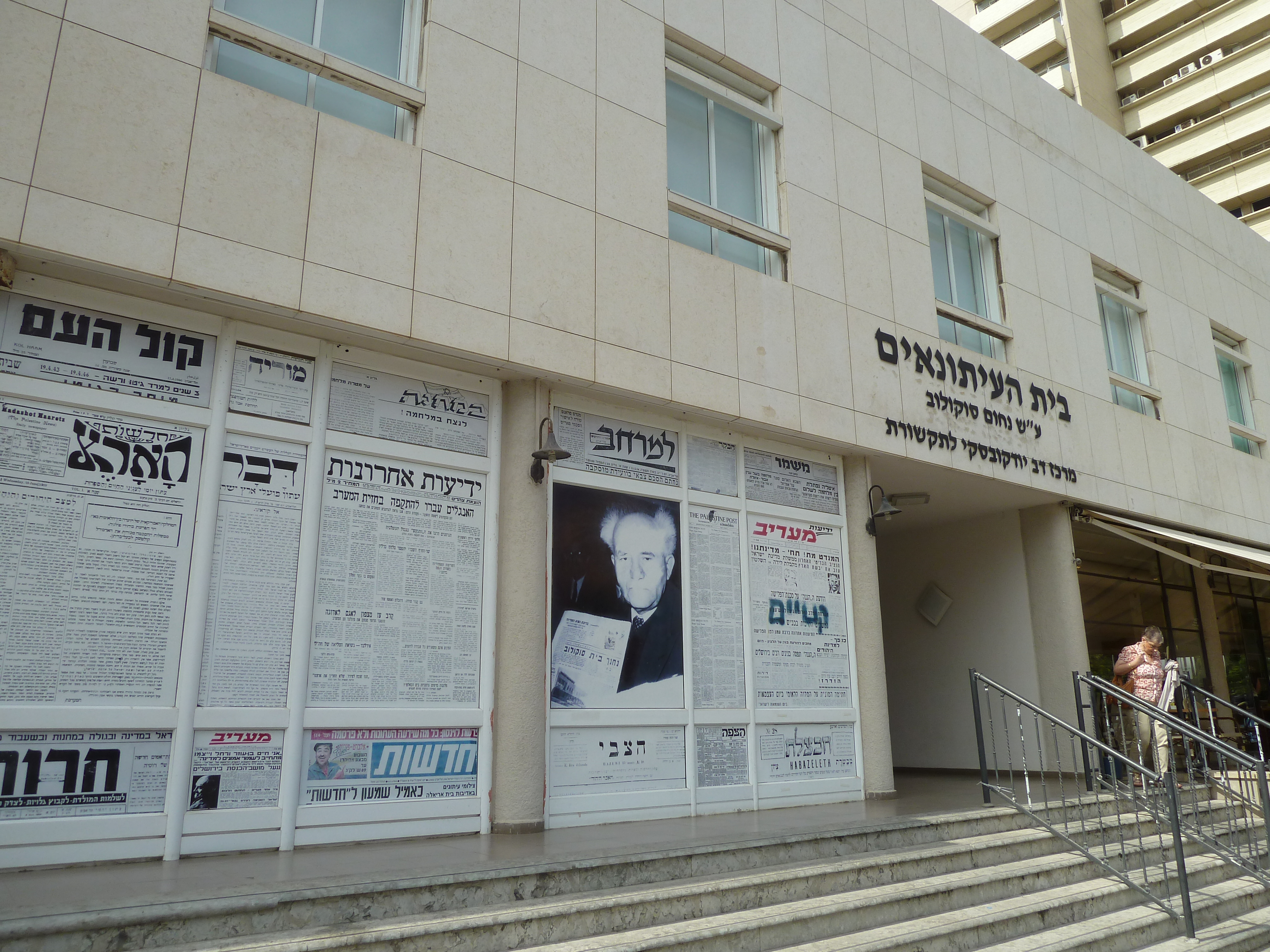
Entrance of Beit Sokolov, house of the Israeli Journalists Association

The Israeli government generally respects freedom of the press, which is protected by the Basic Laws of Israel and independent judiciary. Hate speech, and publishing praise of violence or issues of national security is prohibited. While Israeli journalists operate with little restrictiction, Reporters Without Borders alleges that the authorities enter Palestinian offices and homes looking for "illegal material". Some argue that freedom of press is restricted for Palestinians.

Publication of a newspaper in Israel requires a permit from the government, which continues to implement the Press Ordinance enacted by the Mandatory Government in 1933. Permits can be refused if the proprietor is less than 25 years old or has a criminal record. An investigation by Haaretz early in 2016 revealed that in the preceding decade at least 62 out of more than 500 permit applications had been rejected. Other regulations, including the 1945 Defence (Emergency) Regulations, can also be used to regulate newspaper publication.

According to information provided by the military censor in response to a Freedom of Information request, in 2017 the censor banned the publication of 271 articles outright, and fully or partially redacted 21% of the articles submitted to it.

Following the 2017 Qatar diplomatic crisis Israel took steps to ban Qatar-based Al Jazeera by closing its Jerusalem office, revoking press cards, and asking cable and satellite broadcasters not to broadcast al-Jazeera. Defence minister, Avigdor Lieberman, had described some of al-Jazeera reports as "Nazi Germany-style" propaganda. It was not clear if the measures covered Al Jazeera English, considered less strident.

Under Israeli law, it is forbidden to proselytize to a person under 18 without the consent of a parent. It is also forbidden to offer material benefits in the process of proselytizing.

On 24 November 2024, Israel's government ordered a boycott of the newspaper Haaretz by government officials and anyone working for a government-funded body, and banned government advertising with the newspaper. According to The Guardian, Haaretz "had published a series of investigations of wrongdoing or abuses by senior officials and the armed forces, and has long been in the crosshairs of the current government."

=== Freedom House ===
Freedom House publishes an annual Freedom of the Press report. The 2013 report described Israel as having "the freest press in the region" but downgraded its status from "Free" to "Partly Free" in response to "the indictment of journalist Uri Blau for possession of state secrets, the first time this law had been used against the press in several decades, as well as instances of politicized interference with the content of the Israel Broadcasting Authority radio programs and concerns surrounding the license renewal of television's Channel 10." The 2023 Freedom in the World report gave Israel a 3 out of 4 report for Freedom of Expression. The report stated that though the media is generally free to criticize the government, print articles remain subject to censorship by the military, and that right-ward leaning trends under the Netanyahu administration further threatened public faith in the press.

=== Reporters Without Borders ===
In 2025, Reporters Without Borders ranked Israel 112th out of 180 in their Press Freedom Index. Palestine was rated 163rd out of 180 in the same year. The results for Israel and the Palestinian National Authority from 2002 to the present are shown below, with lower numbers indicating better treatment of reporters:

Year	Israel (Israeli territory)	Israel (extraterritorial)	Palestine	No. of national entities rated	Report URL
2002	92	Not Specified	82	139	
2003	44	146	130	166	
2004	36	115	127	167	
2005	47	Not Specified	132	167	
2006	50	135	134	168	
2007	44	103	158	169	
2008	46	149	163	173	
2009	93	150	161	175	
2014	96	Not Specified	138	180	
2018	87	Not Specified	134	180	
2019	88	Not Specified	137	180	
2020	88	Not Specified	137	180	
2021	86	Not Specified	132	180	
2022	86	Not Specified	170	180	
2023	97	Not Specified	156	180	
2024	101	Not Specified	157	180	
2025	112	Not Specified	163	180	

=== Committee to Protect Journalists ===
According to a report issued by the Committee to Protect Journalists (CPJ) in January 2023, Israel became one of the “worst jailers of journalists,” putting it on par with Iran.

Since the beginning of the Gaza war in October 2023, Israel has detained Palestinian reporters without trial. According to a report in Middle East Eye in March 2025, 208 Palestinian journalists have been killed since the start of the war. Palestinian journalist Hossam Shabat was reportedly targeted in his vehicle in Salah al-Din Street, north of the Gaza enclave. In October 2024, Shabat said the Israeli army had falsely accused him of terrorism. Shabat told the committee to Protect Journalists: “We convey the truth and move within the areas classified by Israel as safe…We are citizens, and we convey their voices." CPJ called upon Israel to stop making unsubstantiated allegations.

Many Palestinian press workers claim they are targeted and harassed while carrying out their work in Israel. One reporter says eight of his family members were killed since he began covering the war. Many journalists complain that they have no safe place to do their jobs as they live in tents and work from makeshift offices in hospitals, where they can access power.

== List of media outlets ==
=== Print ===
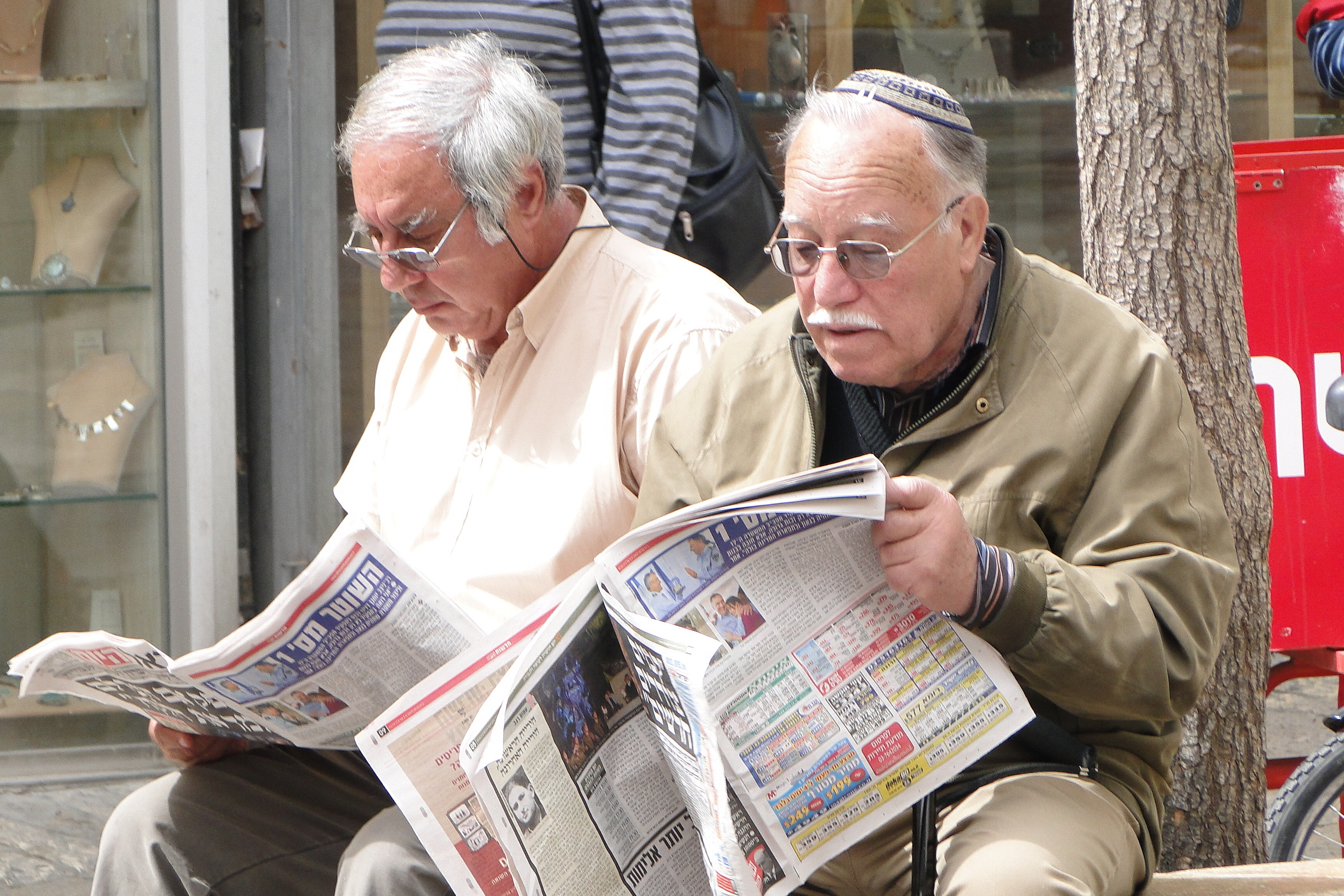
Israel Hayom readers in Jerusalem

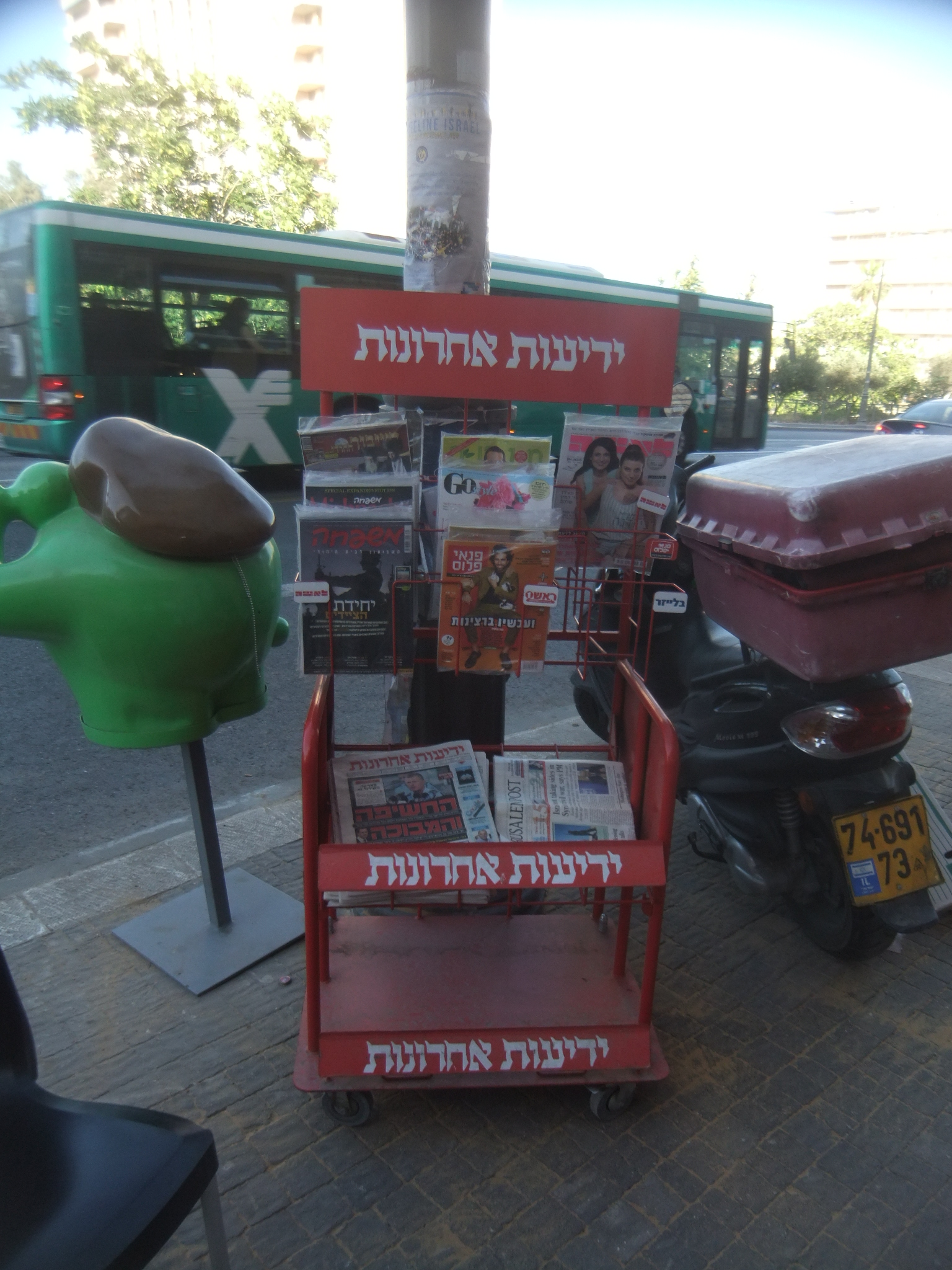
Yedioth Ahronoth stand

Israel has a large number of dailies, weeklies and periodicals, all privately owned.

- B'Sheva: Hebrew-language weekly religious newspaper.
- Calcalist: Hebrew-language daily business newspaper.
- Globes: Hebrew-language daily business newspaper (with online English edition).
- Haaretz: Israel's oldest daily newspaper with Hebrew and English editions.
- Hamodia: daily Haredi newspaper with Hebrew, English and French editions.
- Israel Hayom: Hebrew-language free daily newspaper (with online English edition).
- Israel Post: Hebrew-language free daily newspaper.
- Al-Ittihad: Arabic-language daily communist newspaper.
- The Jerusalem Post: Israel's oldest English-language newspaper.
- Kul al-Arab: Arabic-language weekly newspaper.
- Maariv: Hebrew-language daily newspaper.
- Makor Rishon: Hebrew-language weekly newspaper.
- TheMarker: Hebrew-language business media.
- Vesti: Russian-language daily newspaper.
- Yated Ne'eman: daily Haredi newspaper with Hebrew and English editions.
- Yedioth Ahronoth: Hebrew-language daily newspaper.

=== Broadcast ===
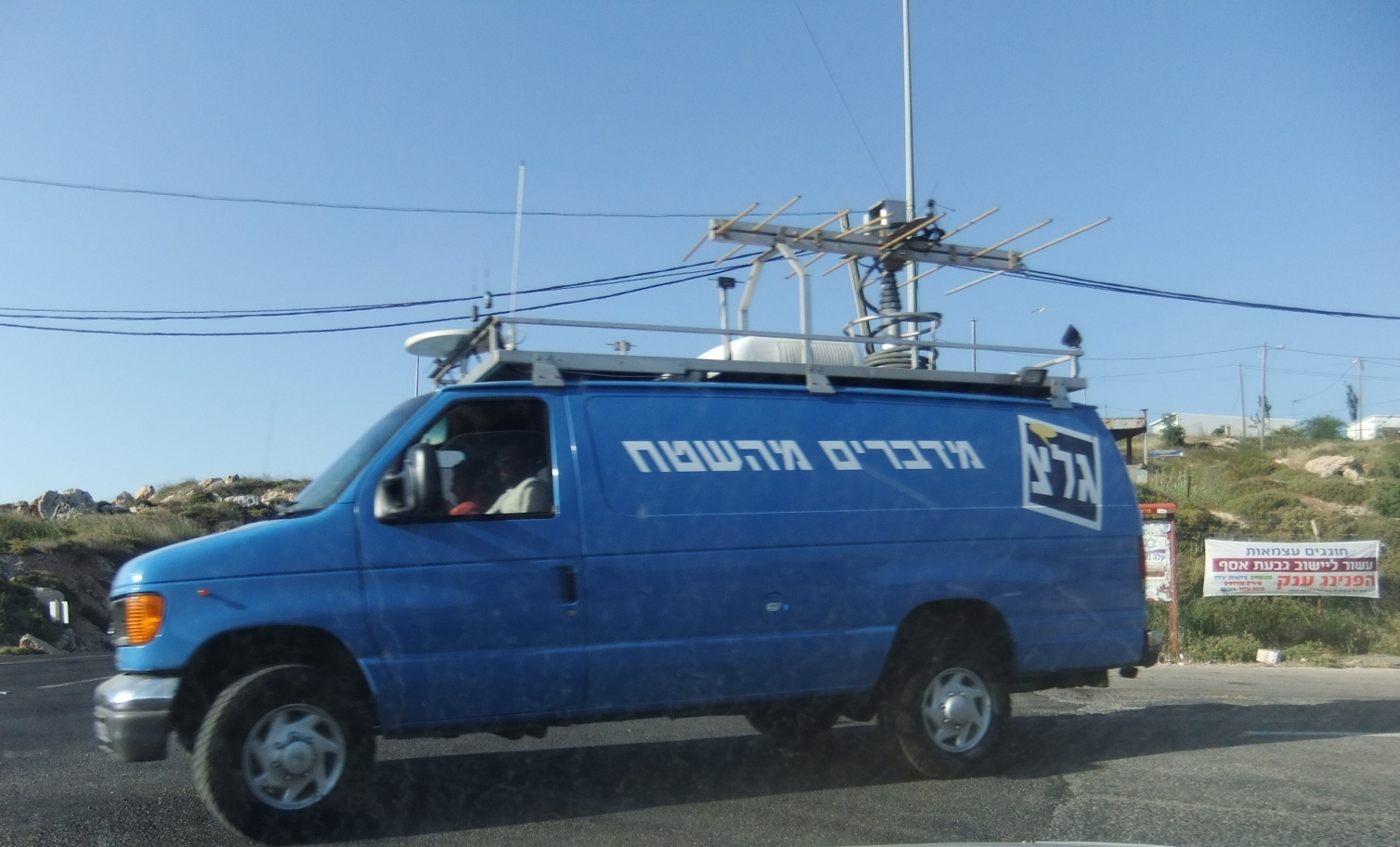
Galei Tzahal broadcasting van

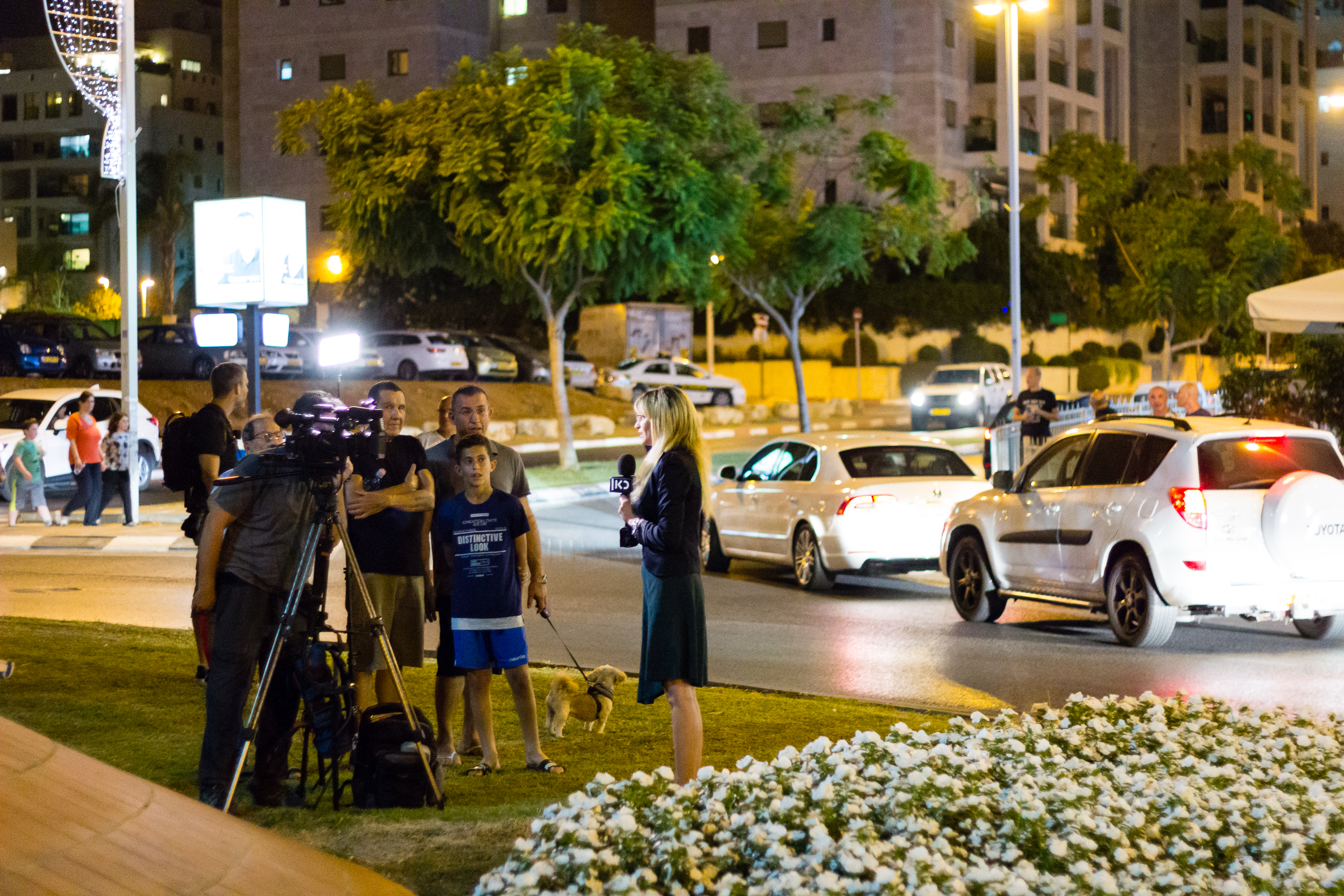
Kan 11 reporting

- Channel 9: Russian-language television channel.
- Keshet 12 Hebrew-language television channel.
- Reshet 13: Hebrew-language television channel.
- Now 14: Hebrew-language television channel aimed at Jewish audience.
- Galei Tzahal: Hebrew-language general interest radio station.
- Galgalatz: Hebrew-language radio station broadcasting music, traffic reports and news.
- i24NEWS: international news television channel in Hebrew, English, French and Arabic.
- Israeli Public Broadcasting Corporation: public broadcaster.
  - Kan 11: Hebrew-language television channel.
  - Kan Educational: Hebrew-language television channel for children.
  - Kan 33 (Makan): Arabic-language television channel.
  - Kol Yisrael: radio service.
- Knesset Channel: Hebrew-language political television channel.
- Kol Chai: Hebrew-language radio station aimed at Orthodox audience.

=== Internet ===
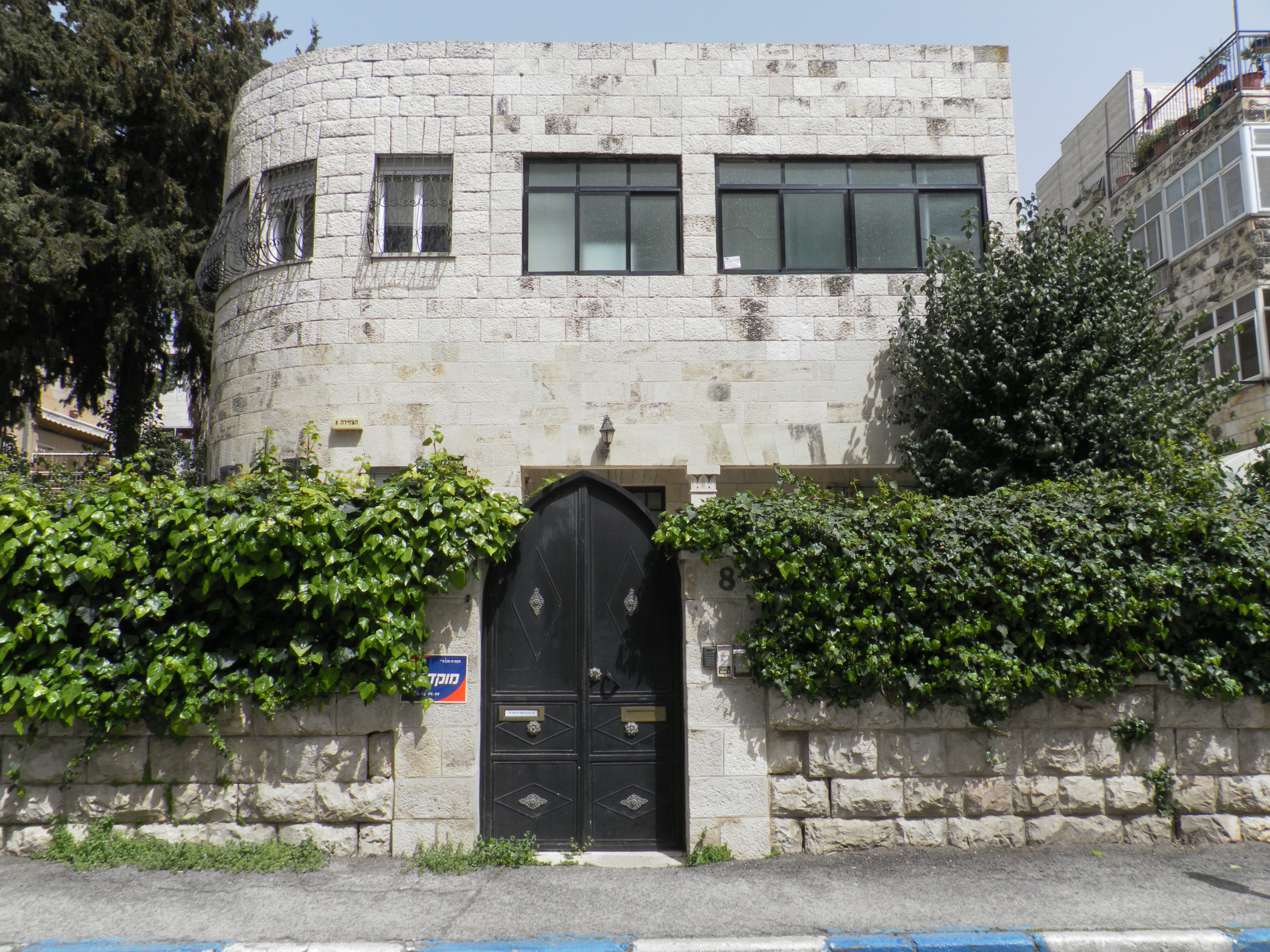
The Times of Israel offices in Jerusalem

- +972 Magazine: An English-language online magazine, with a Hebrew-language sister site, Sikha Mekomit. Provides on-the-ground reporting and analysis of events related to the Israeli–Palestinian conflict.
- Arutz Sheva: radio station and website identifying with religious Zionism in Hebrew, English and Russian.
- Bamahane: online magazine in Hebrew published by the Israel Defense Forces (shut down).
- Debkafile: private website based in Jerusalem for Zionist propaganda in Hebrew and English (inactive).
- Kikar HaShabbat: Hebrew-language Haredi website.
- Mida: online magazine in Hebrew and English.
- Mako: online news and entertainment portal.
- The Times of Israel: news website in English, Arabic, French, Persian and Hebrew.
- Bokra, Israeli-Arab media website
- Davar, Histadrut-affiliated Labor Zionism news website.
- TLV1: English-language internet podcast network based in Tel Aviv founded by Silicon Valley entrepreneur Avner Shelem
- Walla!: web portal in Hebrew and English.
- Ynet: news website in Hebrew and English, online outlet of Yedioth Ahronoth
- Israel-Nachrichten: German-language online daily (discontinued in 2011)
- All Israel News: Daily news website in English, French, German, Spanish, Russian, Portuguese, Korean, and Chinese, based in Jerusalem and founded by Joel C. Rosenberg.

== See also ==
- Beit Sokolov
- Cinema of Israel
- Culture of Israel
- Editors Committee (Israel)
- Government Press Office (Israel)
- HaAyin HaShevi'it
- Historical Jewish Press
- Internet in Israel
- Jewish Telegraphic Agency
- List of news media ownership in Israel
- Media coverage of the Arab–Israeli conflict
- Nakdi Report
- Politics of Israel
- Sokolov Award
- Telecommunications in Israel
- Television in Israel
- The Farsi section of Israel Radio
