= Gideon Kouts =

- Born: 12 July 1948; Łódź, Poland
- Died: 19 September 2026 (aged 78); Paris, France
- Education: Hebrew University of Jerusalem
- Occupation: Journalist
- Years active: 1975–2025
- Known for: International reporting

Gideon Kouts (12 July 1948 – 19 September 2026) was an Israeli journalist, radio presenter, satirist, and historian of the mass media. He also held French and Polish citizenship. He was a correspondent and commentator for the Israel Broadcasting Authority, a European correspondent, special correspondent, and columnist for the newspaper Ma'ariv. He was a full professor and later professor emeritus of communication and Jewish culture at Paris 8 University, and a researcher at Tel Aviv University.

== Biography ==
Gideon Kouts was born in 1948 in Łódź, Poland. He moved with his parents to Warsaw and, in 1957, immigrated with them to Israel. His father, Alexander Kouts, an agronomist by profession, was a senior executive at Teva. He had been one of the partisan commanders who fought the Nazis in the forests of Ukraine, and an officer in both the Red Army and the Israel Defense Forces. His mother, Miriam, was a survivor of the Tuchyn ghetto in Ukraine and the daughter of Getzl Schwartzman, the leader and organizer of that ghetto's uprising, after whom Gideon Kouts was named. He attended the French-language Alliance high school in Ramat Aviv, where he received a science baccalaureate. He was president of the student council and a member of the editorial board of the school newspaper. He played basketball for Hapoel Tel Aviv and performed onstage at the Jerusalem Theatre and the Khan Theatre. He was an officer in the Israeli military and took part in the Yom Kippur War on the southern front. He served in the research department of the intelligence branch and in a unit of financial advisers to the chief of staff.

He was president of the student union of the Hebrew University of Jerusalem [[#ref_Template:מעריב; Template:מעריב|^]], where he earned a bachelor's degree in economics and international relations in 1971, a master's degree in business administration in 1974, and a master's degree in communication in 1976.

He was an adviser to Prime Minister Yitzhak Rabin on social welfare. Later, he represented the Zionist labor movement in Europe and within the Socialist International, and served as the representative of the Zionist Organization's academic department in Paris. In 1980, he completed his studies with honors and earned a doctorate in communication at the Sorbonne. In 1997, he received a higher doctorate (doctorat d'État) from French President Jacques Chirac for his research into the history of Hebrew journalism in Europe. He also held diplomas from the Hague Academy of International Law, the European University Institute in Florence, and the Paris School of Journalism (specialization for foreign correspondents). Between 1992 and 1994, he was a lecturer in the Department of Journalism and Communication at the Hebrew University of Jerusalem and helped establish its bachelor's degree program. Beginning in 1994, he served as a lecturer, associate professor, and full professor of communication and culture at Paris 8 University. There he held the positions of director of the master's program in Cultures, Civilizations and Societies; head of the department and research laboratory for Jewish and Hebrew culture; coordinator of the history, culture and communication curriculum; permanent member of the Center for Studies in Communication, Technology and Internationalization; and director of the European Institute of Hebrew Studies (IEEH).

Beginning in 1996, he directed REEH, a journal devoted to the study of Hebrew and Jewish culture in Europe. From 2006, he was editor-in-chief of Kesher, a journal on the history of Jewish and Israeli journalism and media at Tel Aviv University. For his work promoting Hebrew culture in Europe, he twice received the Ben-Yehuda Medal from the World Hebrew Alliance (first at the 2003 conference in Paris, then at the 2011 conference in Poland). He also received French government grants for outstanding researchers in 2007, 2008, 2009, 2010, and 2011. In 2016, he was elected head of the History Section of the International Association for Media and Communication Research (IAMCR). In 2017, he was appointed visiting professor at Jagiellonian University in Kraków, Poland. From 2018, he was an associate researcher at the Daniel Abraham Center for International and Regional Studies at Tel Aviv University.

His main contribution to media research lay in applying distinctive historical models and patterns of the development of Jewish and Hebrew journalism and media to the study of Israeli media, and in integrating the study of Jewish and Hebrew journalism and media into the broader history of journalism and media worldwide. His work focused in particular on analyzing the personal motivations and activities of media professionals, as well as studying the media from a systemic perspective. His books and articles, written in Hebrew, French, English, and Polish, were translated into other languages. He was invited to serve as an expert before parliamentary committees in France and various institutions in Israel, and as a visiting professor at universities, conferences, and meetings around the world. He was a member of numerous international scientific organizations.

=== Journalism career ===
Gideon Kouts served for five years as president of the Foreign Press Association (APE) in France. He subsequently became its honorary president. He was a member of the Presidential Press Association, a small group of journalists accredited to the French presidency who accompanied the president on official activities and trips. He was vice-president of the French Union of Cinema Journalists and served on international juries at major film festivals around the world, including twice at the Cannes Film Festival.

Gideon Kouts began writing as a high school student for Nitzotsot, the Alliance school newspaper, on whose editorial board he served. He began his professional journalism career as a satirist at the student newspaper Pi HaAton, where he was particularly known for his column Stories of Taamon. He wrote programs for the Jerusalem students' satirical cabaret and later for satirical venues such as the Theater Club in Tel Aviv, as well as for television and radio programs. In 1975, he wrote a satirical column, What's Going On, for the newspaper Davar. In 1977, he became the newspaper's correspondent in Paris and its special correspondent around the world. He continued writing for Davar and serving on its editorial staff until the newspaper closed in 1996. He also wrote for Maariv, officially serving as its Paris correspondent from 2010, as well as for Yedioth Ahronoth, Globes, and Hadashot. From 1979, he hosted programs on Galei Tzahal. From 1986, he was a correspondent for Kol Yisrael.

Between 2001 and 2007, he was a correspondent for Channel 2 in Europe. From 2008, he worked as a reporter for Channel One, which became part of the Israeli Public Broadcasting Corporation in 2017. He appeared as a regular commentator on numerous international media outlets, including France 24, France Info, TF1, France 2, Radio France, the BBC, Al Jazeera, L'Arche, The Jewish Chronicle, and many others.

Gideon Kouts covered, among other events, the events in Tiananmen Square in China; the Cambodian Civil War; visits by Pope John Paul II to Poland and Cuba; the fall of the Berlin Wall; revolutions in the Soviet Union and Eastern Europe (Poland, Romania, Albania, and the Czech Republic); the civil wars in the former Yugoslavia; the First Chechen War and its capital, Grozny; crises in Algeria and Kosovo; the peace process following the Madrid Conference of 1991; the inauguration of Nelson Mandela as President of South Africa; elections and the protest movement in Iran; reports from the royal palace in Saudi Arabia, presidential palaces in Damascus and Beirut, Libya, Vietnam, and favelas controlled by organized crime in Brazil; the attack on the Twin Towers; Pakistan and the War in Afghanistan (2001–2021); the Arab Spring revolutions in Egypt, Tunisia, and Libya; deadly attacks in Paris, Toulouse, Brussels, Nice, Istanbul, Berlin, and London; nuclear negotiations with Iran in Geneva and Vienna; the crisis in Ukraine and Crimea; the Kurdish independence referendum in northern Iraq; the Yellow Vest social protests in central Paris; and the Russian invasion of Ukraine in 2022.

== Personal life ==
Gideon Kouts was married to journalist and photographer Yaffa Iron-Kouts, the Paris correspondent for Ynet, who had written for the weekly magazine Laisha since the 1990s. They had a daughter and a son.

Gideon Kouts died in Paris at the age of 78 from a rare, aggressive intravascular lymphoma. He was buried at Yarkon Cemetery near Tel Aviv.

== Publications ==
- Stories of Taamon, Tarkalin Publishing House, Gvanim, Tel Aviv, 1977, 102 pages.
- Reviewers and Periodical Letters: Studies in the History of the Hebrew and Jewish Press, Yaron Golan Publishing House, Tel Aviv, 1999, 152 pages.
- News and Chronicles: Studies in the History of the Hebrew and Jewish Press and Media, Zionist Library Press, Bialik Institute, Andrea and Charles Bronfman Institute for the Study of the Jewish Press and Media, Tel Aviv University, 2013/2013, 216 pages.
- The Birth of the Hebrew Press: The Major Periodicals in Europe (La naissance de la presse hébraïque : Les grands périodiques en Europe), Paris, 1993.
- The Hebrew Press in Europe: Its Origins and Development from 1856 to 1897 (La presse hébraïque en Europe, ses origines et son évolution de 1856 à 1897), 2 volumes, Lille, 1997.
- The Hebrew and Jewish Press in Europe: Some Problems in Its History (La presse hébraïque et juive en Europe : quelques problèmes de son histoire), Paris–London, 2006.
