= List of news media ownership in Israel =

News media in Israel is owned by business families and individuals along with numerous investors.

== Private ownership ==
| Logo | Name | Family | Individuals | News media groups and news media outlets | Ref | Political Affiliation |
|---|---|---|---|---|---|---|
| | Keshet Media Group | Vertheim | Mozi Vertheim, Avi Nir | Keshet International, Channel 12 (Hevrat HaHadashot), Mako, N12, V1 | | |
| | Miriam Adelson | Adelson | Sheldon Adelson, Miriam Adelson, Amir Finkelstein | Israel Hayom, Makor Rishon | | Right-wing, Likud leaning |
| | Yedioth Ahronoth Group | Mozes | Arnon Mozes, Miriam Nofach-Mozes, Judy Shalom Nir-Mozes, Tsion Peres | Yedioth Ahronoth (Yedioth Tikshoret), Ynet (Menta), Mynet, Calcalist (Ctech), LaIsha, Vesti, Pnai Plus, Frogi, Xnet | | |
| | Haaretz Group | Schocken | Amos Schocken, Leonid Nevzlin | Haaretz, TheMarker | | Left-wing, liberal leaning |
| | Patrick Drahi | Drahi | Patrick Drahi | i24NEWS (Israeli, American, French, Arabic) | | Right-wing leaning |
| | Maariv Holdings | Azur | Eli Azur | Maariv (Maariv Online, Maariv Ha'shavoa, Maariv La'noar), The Northern Radio, The Jerusalem Post, The Jerusalem Report, ECO99fm, Walla, Hamal, National Geographic Israel | | |
| | Jewish Israeli Channel Ltd. | Mirilashvili | Yitzchak Mirilashvili | Channel 14 (Magazine 14), 0404 News, Kol Chai | | Right-wing, Likud leaning |
| | Yuval Sigler Communications Ltd. | Sigler | Yuval Sigler | Time Out Tel Aviv, You, The Table | | |
| | Liberal Communications Ltd. | Nevzlin | Leonid Nevzlin | Liberal, Detaly, NEP | | Liberal |
| | Reshet | Blavatnik | Len Blavatnik, Nadav Topolsky, Udi Angel | Channel 13 (Channel 13 News) | | |

== Government ownership ==
| Logo | Name | Individuals | News media groups and news media outlets | Ref |
|---|---|---|---|---|
| | Israeli Public Broadcasting Corporation | Golan Yochpaz | Kan 11, Kan News, Makan 33, Kan Educational, Knesset Channel, Kol Yisrael, Kan Tarbut, Kan Bet , Kan Gimel, Radio Makan, Kan REKA, Kan 88, Kan Moreshet | |
