= Doron Galezer =

Israeli journalist

Doron Galezer (Hebrew: דורון גלעזר; born 1952) is an Israeli journalist, former chief executive editor of Maariv newspaper and former chief executive editor of Uvda, an Israeli investigative journalism television show. He previously served as the chairman of Israel's Editors Committee. Galezer was born and raised in Afeka Tel-Aviv.

== Politics ==
In 1973, at the age of 21, he was appointed spokesman of "Moked," a left wing movement. He then became a co-founder of the peace party, "Mahane Sheli", and served as its spokesman during the 1977 elections. Galezer did not continue in politics after the 1977 elections.

== Professional Journalism ==
Galezer started his journalistic career in the early 1980s at Jerusalem weekly newspaper, Kol Ha-Ir, which earned an impressive reputation as qualitative, bold, liberal that included exclusive interviews and extensive in-depth investigative reporting.

In the mid-1990s, Galezer was appointed editor in chief of Schocken Group's local newspapers. At the end of 1996, Galezer was appointed editor in chief of "7 Days" weekly magazine in Yediot Aharonot, then the most widely circulated magazine in Israel.

He earned a name as a bold editor who published many important stories of government corruption and questionable connections between tycoons and politicians – including the first investigative reporting about Prime Minister Benjamin Netanyahu's family receiving gifts (The Amedi case) and his wife's problematic behavior (The Sara case).

The weekly magazine also published exposes of a series of military and security failures – one of which won the most important journalistic award in Israel for research about the high propensity of cancer among naval commando sailors due to training exercises in the polluted Kishon river. Continuing his successful track record, Galezer was appointed Deputy Editor in Chief of Yedioth Aharonot in charge of all the papers' magazines.

== Television career ==
At the beginning of the millennium, Galezer retired from Yedioth Aharonot to pursue a television career and served for 6 years as editor in chief of the Israeli investigative TV show, Uvda with Ilana Dayan.

Galezer introduced a dramatic change in the program's format and engaged, alongside Ilana Dayan, a team of star reporters and investigative journalists, such as Itai Engel, Omri Assenhaim, Orly Vilnai, Igal Musco and Roni Kuban. Under his leadership, Uvda published investigative reports about criminals taking over 'Roberto' Models Agency, Israir airlines cover-up of a near accident at Ben Gurion airport, Captain R' - killing of a girl by the Israeli Army at Girit base, the Ferinian case – an investigation leading to a Commission of Inquiry and ousting of police inspector general Moshe Karadi, and Anthrax experiments done on special units’ soldiers, an investigation that also led to establishing a Commission of Inquiry.

== Journalism ==
At the end of 2007 Galezer was appointed co-editor in chief of Maariv newspaper alongside Ruth Yuval replacing Amnon Dankner. Galezer and Yuval succeeded in cutting its losses (from ILS 5 million to ILS 1 million) and stopped the decrease in circulation, but resigned In 2009, following disagreements with Maariv's publisher, Ofer Nimrodi. Since 2009, Galezer has been a member of the press council, a board member of DocAviv international documentary film festival, and an investigative press lecturer at The Tel Aviv Academic College and The Netanya Academic College.

In 2017, Galezer, together with David Deri and Ruth Yuval, created the movie and TV series, "The Ancestral Sin" ("Sallah, this is Eretz Israel") revealing how immigrants from North Africa were deceitfully settled in distant, forgotten, small towns during the 1950s and 1960s.
