= Vesty =

Vesty may refer to:

- Sam Vesty, an English rugby player
- Vesti (TV channel), a TV station in Russia
- Vesti (Israeli newspaper), a newspaper in Israel
