= Yoram Peri =

- יורם פרי
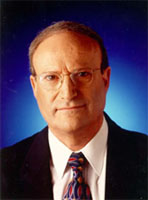
- Born: Yoram Paritzky; 1944 (age 81–82); Jerusalem, Palestine, United Kingdom
- Education: Hebrew University of Jerusalem
- Political party: Israeli Labor
- Spouse: Pnina
- Children: 2 daughters and 1 son

Yoram Peri (Hebrew: יורם פרי; born 1944) is a professor emeritus at the University of Maryland, College Park, in the United States, where he held the Abraham and Jack Kay Chair in Israel Studies, and established and directed the Joseph and Alma Gildenhorn Institute for Israel Studies at the University of Maryland. Peri is a sociologist and media scholar. He served as editor-in-chief of the Israeli daily newspaper, Davar; political advisor to the late Prime Minister, Yitzhak Rabin, and is a public activist. In 2003, he founded the Haim Herzog Institute for Media, Politics, and Society, at Tel Aviv University.

== Biography ==
Yoram Peri (originally Paritzky) was born in Jerusalem to a veteran Jerusalem family. His great grandfather arrived in Palestine from Poland in 1865 and settled in the Muslim Quarter of the Old City. The family moved out of the walls of the Old City in 1940. He studied at the Tachkemoni Religious Grammar School and at the Beit HaKerem Secondary School (now the Hebrew University High School). He was active in the Israeli Scouts and enlisted in the Israel Defense Forces as a member of a Scouts Pioneering Infantry Group (Nachal). From 1962–1965, he served as a military journalist for the IDF monthly magazine, B'Machane Nachal. He completed his BA and MA studies in political science and sociology with honors at the Hebrew University of Jerusalem. His master's thesis, written in 1973, explored "The Creation of a New Civilian Elite – of Senior Military Reserve Officers." His doctoral dissertation, written at the London School of Economics, addressed military engagement in politics. He has been active throughout his career in three spheres: media, academia, and public activism.

=== Media and journalism ===
Peri began his journalism career as a cub reporter for the children's weekly, Ha'aretz Shelanu, and as a youth correspondent for Ma'ariv L'Noar. During his service in the IDF, he was a military correspondent for the IDF monthly, B'Machane Nachal. He spent most of his journalism career at the Hebrew daily, Davar. Beginning as a reporter in 1965, he wrote articles, features, and a personal column; moving up, he became editor of the editorial page, chief news editor, managing editor, and then deputy editor-in-chief. Upon the retirement of Hannah Zemer in 1990, Peri was appointed editor-in-chief of Davar, a post he held until 1995.

As editor-in-chief, Peri instituted numerous changes. The designer, Yarom Vardimon, modernized the paper's graphic design. The paper's tagline – "the newspaper of Israel's workers" – was eliminated and the paper became more open and diverse. Davar was the first newspaper in Israel to publish a section on LGBT issues; coverage of the Mizrachi community and the periphery was expanded; and the newspaper published "The Hammer," a critical journal dealing with the unprivileged.

Although the editorial innovations changed the newspaper and made it more critical and updated, poor management by the publisher, the Histadrut, (Israel's Workers Federation) could not end the deep financial deficits. Peri endeavored to prevent the closure of the paper and, in 1995, he left. Ron Ben-Yishai, upon his appointment as the new editor-in-chief, renamed the paper Davar Rishon, but a year later the newspaper closed.

Over the years, Peri has written various newspapers, journals and internet sites, presented radio and television programs, and published in international media platforms. He was a member of the Israel Editors Committee and chaired the Committee from 1993–1995. He was a member of the Israeli Press Council and a member of its executive committee, as well as a member of the editorial staff of academic journals. In 2009, he founded the Israel Studies Review, the academic journal of the International Association for Israel Studies, and served as its editor-in-chief until 2021.

=== Public activity ===
In 1970, while working as a political reporter for Davar, Peri was recruited by the Secretary-General of the Israeli Labor Party, Aryeh (Lova) Eliav, to become the spokesperson for the Party, a post he filled until 1975. He later became the political representative of the Labor Party in Europe, serving as liaison between the leadership of the Israeli Labor Party and the leadership of the labour and social-democratic parties in Europe. In that capacity he also represented Israel in the Socialist International.

During those years, he fostered close relationships with some of the prominent leaders of the European left in the 1970s, including Britain's Harold Wilson and James Callaghan, Germany's Willy Brandt, Francois Mitterrand of France, and Bruno Kreisky of Austria, as well as numerous parliamentarians in those and other European countries. Peri was the first Israeli to establish connections with the new leadership of the Spanish Socialist Party before it came to power. In 1977, the party, headed by Felipe Gonzalez, won the first democratic elections in Spain and formed a government.

When Yitzhak Rabin returned to Israel in 1973, after serving as ambassador to the United States and entered politics in the Labor Party, Peri, then the Party spokesperson, became one of Rabin's close advisors. Together with Dov Tzamir, he led Rabin's primary campaign and, upon Rabin's nomination as Labor Party candidate for prime minister, Peri became Rabin's political advisor.

Yoram Peri has been active in various civic organizations, and particularly in social change organizations. He was a member of the Board of Directors of the New Israel Fund, and its international president from 2000–2002. He was a member of the Board of Directors of the Van Leer Jerusalem Institute, and served on the advisory committee to the State Comptroller. In 1995, together with Shira Herzog, then head of the Kahanoff Foundation, he founded the Maof Fellowships, a program designed to increase the number of Arab-Israeli faculty members in Israeli academic institutions. Due to this project the number of tenured Israeli Palestinian lecturers at all academic institutions rose from 12 to 150. In 2017–2019 Dr. Peri was the vice President of the world Association for Israel Studies.

=== Academic career ===
Following his retirement as editor-in-chief of Davar, Peri joined the Department of Communications of the Hebrew University in Jerusalem and then the Department of Communications at Tel Aviv University. At TAU, he established and directed the Haim Herzog Institute for Media, Politics, and Society. He was a guest lecturer and researcher at the Institute for National Security Studies in Tel Aviv, and at universities and research institutions around the world, including Harvard, Dartmouth, American University in Washington D.C., the US Institute of Peace, and others. Peri has won international awards, among them the prestigious Fulbright Scholarship. Five of his books have won prizes in Israel and abroad.

Peri's fields of research and publication focus on civil–military relations, and, in particular, relations between the military and politics, political sociology, political communications (and relations between the military and the media), and issues of democracy. Peri studied under Shmuel Eisenstadt, Moshe Lissak, and Dan Horowitz, and examined the involvement of the IDF in Israeli politics. His research refuted the view, widely held until the early 1970s, that Israel embodied a model according to which the role of the military was instrumental and uninvolved in politics. Peri's research demonstrated that Israel exhibits a different, dual model in which the military, although subordinate to the civilian government, is, in fact, an active political player. Thus, Peri became a pioneer among the second generation of Israeli scholars of political-military relations, describing the relations between the political and military upper echelons as "a political-military partnership."

In the field of political communications, Peri addressed the changes in the political system caused by the media with the spread of "the media logic" into the field of politics and the emergence of "media-politics." He studied the rise of populist leaders like Berlusconi, Carlos Menem, and Benjamin Netanyahu, and coined the term "tele-populism" in his book, Tele-Populism: Media and Politics in Israel in the 1990s.

After the assassination of Prime Minister Yitzhak Rabin in 1995, Peri researched the murder, the societal and political trends that preceded it, and issues of commemoration and collective memory. He has published four books on the subject – three in English and one in Hebrew, Brothers at War: Rabin's Assassination and the Cultural War in Israel.

In 2017, the Institute for National Security Studies in Tel Aviv published Peri's book, Mediatized Wars: The Paradox of Power and Israel's Strategic Dilemma (Hebrew). Peri argues that the process of "mediatization" in contemporary society has led to changes in the nature of war. In modern warfare, including Israel's war against terror and guerilla insurgency organizations, the kinetic, physical dimension has been overlaid by a perceptual dimension.

== Personal life ==
Yoram Peri is married to Dr. Pnina Peri who introduced the field of gender studies and education at the Levinsky College of Education and taught at the University of Maryland. The couple have two daughters and a son and eight grand children, all living in Israel.

== Books and monographs ==
Yoram Peri has published more than eighty articles and six academic books in addition to hundreds of op-ed articles in the Israeli and international press. His book, Brothers at War: Rabin's Assassination and the Cultural War in Israel (Hebrew), was published in 2005 and received an award from the Council for Commemoration of Israel's Presidents and Prime Ministers. His book, Generals in the Cabinet Room: How the Military Shapes Israel Policy, published in 2006, received an award for excellence from the Association of American University Presses.

=== Books published in English ===
- Between Battles and Ballots: Israeli Military in Politics, Cambridge UK and New York: Cambridge University Press, 2009
- Generals in the Cabinet Room: How the Military Shapes Israel Policy, Washington DC: US Institute of Peace, 2006[i].
- Tele-Populism: Media and Politics in Israel in the 1990's, Stanford: Stanford University Press, 2004
- The Israeli Military and Israel's Palestinians Policy, Washington DC: US Institute of Peace Press , 2002
- The Assassination of Yitzhak Rabin, (ed. and contributor of four chapters), Stanford: Stanford University Press, c2000
- Between Battles and Ballots: Israeli Military in Politics, Cambridge UK and New York: Cambridge University Press., 1983

Latest Academic Articles in English

- Peri, Y. Why was the IDF mobilized to fight against the Corona epidemic? In Meir Elran, Carmit Padan, Amichai Cohen, Idit Sgafran-Gitelma, (eds) Civil Military relations in the shadow of the corona, a special report by INSS, 2020.
- Peri, Y. The Time has Come for a New Security Paradigm, Memorandum No. 195, INSS, October 2019.
- Peri, Y. Afterword: Rabin: From Mr. Security to Nobel Prize Winner, in The Rabin Memoirs, Berkeley: California University Press (pp. 339–380), 1996.
