= Blue square =

Blue square may refer to:

- Blue SQ, a gambling company originally owned by The Rank Group but sold to Betfair in 2013.
- Piste#Ratings, a rating for ski trails
- Alon Blue Square, an Israeli holding company
