= Dankner =

Dankner is a surname. Notable people with the surname include:

- Amnon Dankner (1946–2013), Israeli newspaper editor and writer
- Nochi Dankner (born 1954), Israeli businessman
