= Davar =

Israeli newspaper

- Owner: Histadrut
- Founded: 1 June 1925
- Ceased publication: May 1996
- Political alignment: Histadrut
- Language: Hebrew
- Headquarters: Tel Aviv

Davar (Hebrew: דָּבָר, lit. Word, Speech, Thing) was a Hebrew-language daily newspaper published in the British Mandate of Palestine and Israel between 1925 and May 1996. A similarly named website was launched in 2016, under the name Davar Rishon as an online outlet by the Histadrut.

== History ==
=== Newspaper (1925–1996) ===
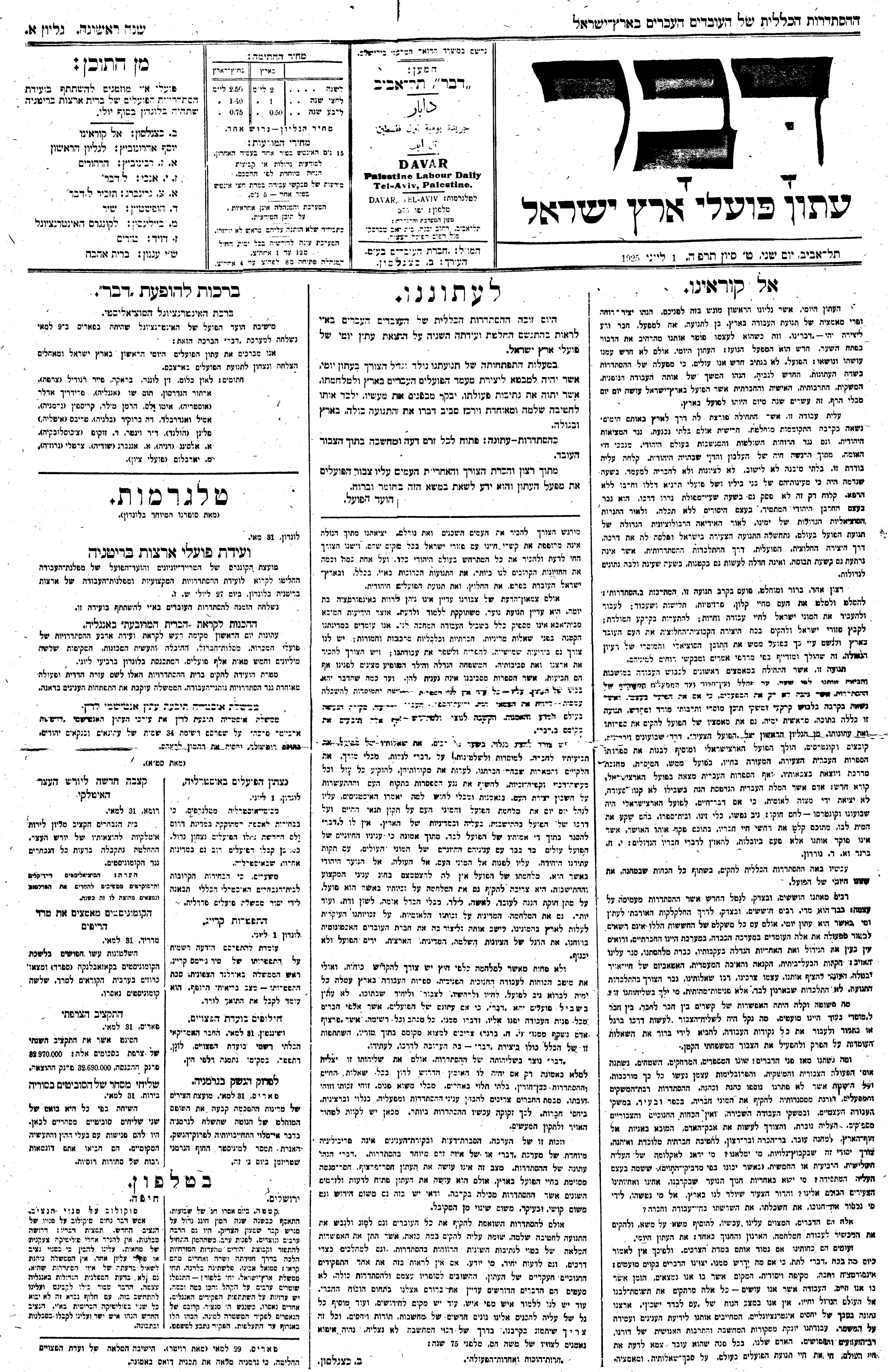
The first page of Davar's first issue

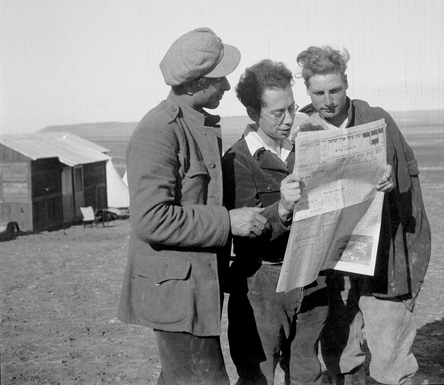
Reading Davar at Kibbutz HaZore'a

Davar was established by Moshe Beilinson and Berl Katznelson, with Katznelson as its first editor, as the newspaper of the Histadrut. The first edition was published on 1 June 1925 under the name Davar – Iton Poalei Eretz Yisrael (lit. Davar – Newspaper of Eretz Yisrael Workers).

The paper was successful, and published several supplements, including Davar HaPoelet ([Female] Worker's Davar, a women's paper), HaMeshek HaShitufi (Co-operative Economy), Davar HaShvua (Davar This Week) and Davar LeYeldim (Davar for Children), as well as the union newsletter Va'adken (Update). By 1950 it had around 400 employees and had an extensive distribution system.

Upon Katznelson's death in 1944 Zalman Shazar, later President of Israel, took over as editor. Hana Zemer edited the paper between 1970 and 1990.

After the formation of the Labor Party by the merger of Mapai, Ahdut HaAvoda and Rafi in 1968, LaMerhav, the Ahdut HaAvoda-affiliated newspaper, merged into Davar. Its last edition published on 31 May 1971 with Davar officially renamed "Davar – Meuhad Im LaMerhav" (lit. Davar – United with LaMerhav).

By the 1980s the paper was in severe financial difficulties. After Zemer retired in 1990, the paper had joint editors Yoram Peri and Daniel Bloch. The paper was renamed Davar Rishon and Ron Ben-Yishai took over as editor. However, the Histadrut closed the newspaper in 1996. Its building on the corner of Melchett and Shenkin streets in Tel Aviv was demolished and replaced by an apartment block.

=== Online publication (2016–) ===
In 2016, Davar Rishon was relaunched as a web-only news publication. In April, 2019 the website was closed for several weeks in a labor dispute. It reopened with a new editorial desk. In October 2019 it started to publish also an English edition. In January 2020 it started to publish an Arabic edition.

== Notable journalists ==
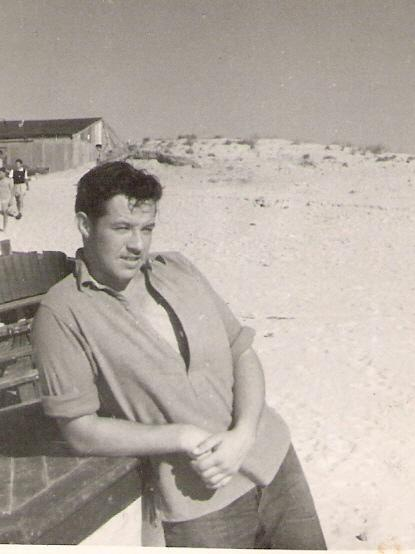
Dan Ben-Amotz

- Shmuel Yosef Agnon
- Natan Alterman
- Yossi Beilin (born 1948)
- Moshe Beilinson
- Dan Ben-Amotz (1924–89), radio broadcaster, journalist, playwright, and author
- Amnon Dankner
- Leah Goldberg
- Haim Gouri (1923-2018), poet, novelist, journalist, and documentary filmmaker
- Uri Zvi Greenberg
- Gideon Kouts (1948-2026)
- Tali Lipkin-Shahak
- Aryeh Navon (cartoonist)
- Dov Sadan
- Yitzhak Yatziv
- David Zakai
