= Alexander Averbukh =

Russian journalist

- Александр Авербух
- Born: Alexander Vladimirovich Averbukh; 14 December 1957 (age 68); Moscow, Soviet Union
- Occupations: Journalist, anchorman, teacher, engineer, author, singer

Alexander Vladimirovich Averbukh (born December 14, 1957, in Moscow) journalist, television and radio anchorman, chemistry and computer science teacher, engineer of manufacturing automation, author and performer of songs.

After graduating from the Moscow technical university he worked in his field, until eventually abandoning the career in engineering and becoming a middle school chemistry teacher. Obtained his master's degree. Taught chemistry and computer science, became a teacher and teaching instructor. In parallel, he worked as a freelance author for the "Youth" radio station, was published in "Moskovskiy Komsomolets", "Teacher’s newspaper" and other publications. From the time he was a student he wrote and performed songs. In the end of the 1980s he became interested in Zionist teachings, from 1990 – a member of the All-union Zionist organization presidium. He was the founder and the first director of the Jewish children's organization "Banim Banot" (still operating). After moving to Israel he changed his profession again and became a journalist. Worked as an author and an editor in the humorous newspaper "Beseder?", and later as the economic editor of the newspaper «Vesti». The newspaper created an addition called "Treasurer" (still exiting) of which Alexander was the chief editor. In addition, for many years he authored a weekly column called "Buhes’ reaction". In 1997 he began working part-time on the «Arutz sheva» ("Seventh channel) radio station, where he founded and hosted a weekly program called “The Republic" for 5 years. In April 2002 he began working at the television channel «Israel Plus (Channel 9), as one of the founders of the channel. After the channel went on air at November 2002, he was the editor of the programs "Servants of the people" and "Of legal age", editor and host of "Three opinions" and "Wunderkind show", author, editor and host of "Money time", and the host of the documentary series "Tmol’-shilshom". He participated in the programs "Seven forty", "Contact" and others.

== Activities ==
=== Engineer ===
In 1979, he graduated from the Faculty of Technical Cybernetics and automation of chemical production of the Moscow Institute of Chemical Engineering. Was assigned to the Institute of Biomedical Problems, however, he was rejected due to his nationality. He acquired a position in SKB Turbo-refrigerating machinery as a senior engineer. In 1980, he transferred to SKTB Himmash as a lead engineer. In 1982, he graduated with honors from the Moscow People's State University of technological progress and economic knowledge in the field of chemical engineering. In March 1989, shortly before his departure to Israel, he opened a private cooperative called "Center of New Information Technologies" in Moscow.

=== Teacher ===
In September 1984, changed his profession and went to work in middle school number 682 of the Leningrad district of Moscow as a chemistry teacher. After the integration of the foundations of computer science into the school system, he taught it in addition to chemistry. In 1988, he transferred to middle school number 159 of the Leningrad district of Moscow, from which he once graduated. In 1986 he graduated from an instruction course in computer science. From September 1986 to July 1991 he worked as a part-time lecturer and instructor at the All-Union Institute of Advanced Computer Science teachers. He wrote, along with co-authors, a manual for teachers called "Learning the basics of computer science and computer engineering." (The book was published by "Prosvesheniye" in 1992, when he was already in Israel.)

=== Journalist ===
As an engineer and later on a teacher, he collaborated with several periodicals, wrote texts for the radio shows on the "Yunost" radio station and was published in newspapers. After the immigration to Israel in October 1991 he had made journalism his main profession. From November 1991 until December 1992 he worked as an author and editor in the Israeli humorous newspaper "Beseder?". In 1992 he participated in the first international KVN game: "The Russian national team — the team of Israeli universities" as one of the authors for the Israeli team. From January 1993 until August 2001, was the economic editor of the Israeli newspaper "Vesti". From February 1997 to March 2002 – the editor and presenter on the radio station "Arutz Sheva" ("Seventh Channel"). From April 2002 until July 2013, he was an author, editor and presenter on TV "Israel Plus" ("Channel 9").

=== Bard ===
Author of lyrics and music:

- 1973 Grace ("Everybody go abroad like fools ...")
- 1975 Idol s ("Mother Russia has always, in all ages ...)
- 1975 The specter of communism ("Theorists of Marxism-engelsizm wrote...")
- 1976 Weather forecast for party employees ("We have the great pleasure ...")
- 1976 Monologue of Gregory Moiseich
- 1977 The cart ("I understand: to sing something of the sort is risky ...")
- 1981 Tanks in Paris ("Our cheerful Private Ivanov ...")
- 1982 Cruise missiles ("It’s the peak of summer over Moscow...")
- 1983 Epitaph ("I'll die in bed ...")
- 1995 Chapaisky waltz ("Vasily Ivanych Chapaev ...")
- 2013 The peace process ("What's going on in Israel? ...")

=== Book Author ===
1. «Learning the basics of computer science and computer engineering», "Prosvesheniye", 1992. : co-written with V.B. Gisin, et al.
2. «"A short, to the extent possible in this case, Jewish Encyclopedia», “Beseder?", 2004
3. «The Saga of the Rothschilds, or how a business starts», Direct Media, 2009.
