= Beit Sokolov =

Coordinates: 32.073189°N 34.782442°E

Beit Sokolow
- בית העיתונאים על שם סוקולוב בתל־אביב יפו
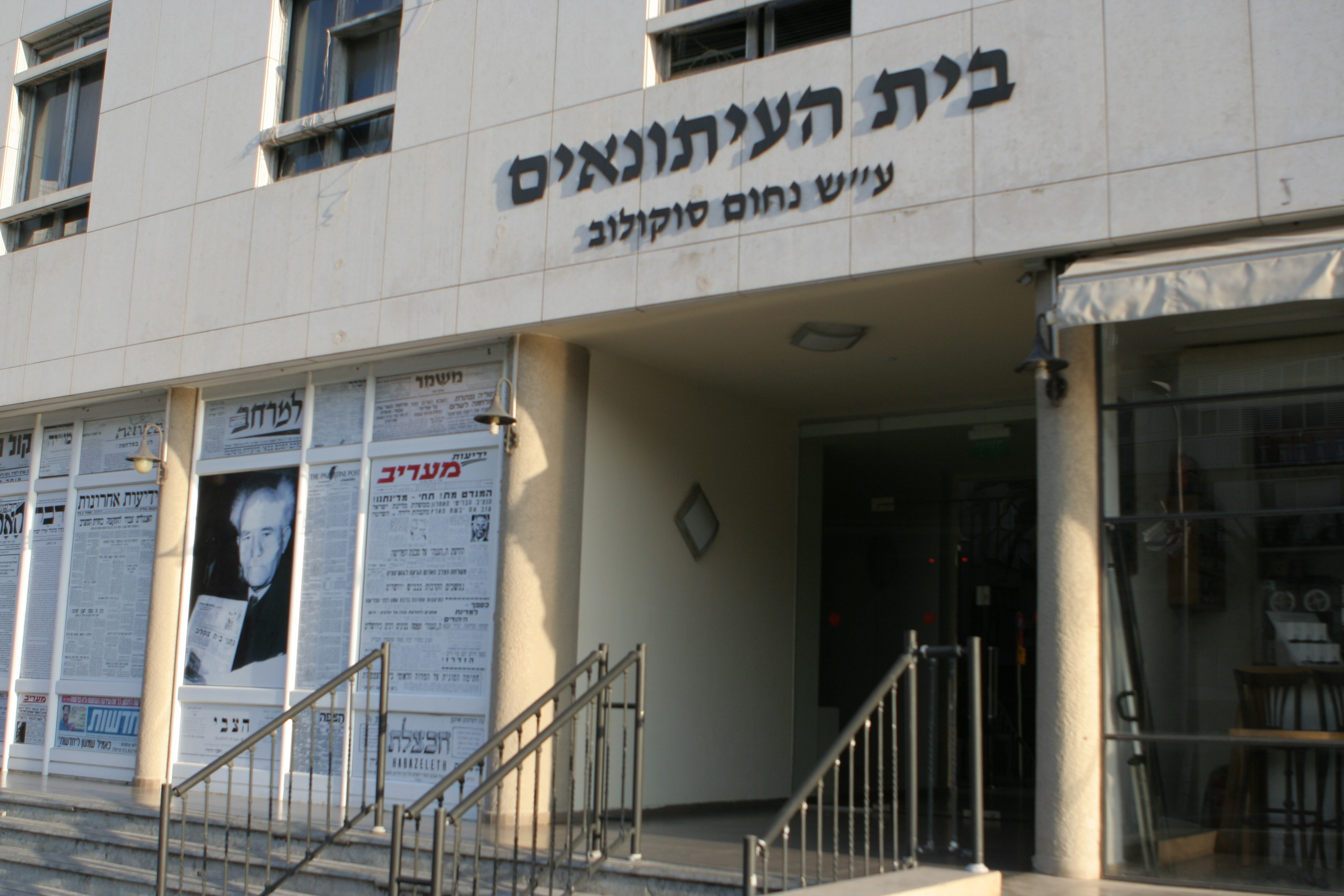
- Beit Sokolow, Tel Aviv
- Interactive map of the Beit Sokolow area
- Alternative names: Sokolov House

General information
- Status: Completed
- Location: Tel Aviv, Israel
- Completed: 1957

Design and construction
- Known for: Headquarters of the National Association of Israeli Journalists

Beit Sokolow (Hebrew: בית העיתונאים על שם סוקולוב בתל־אביב יפו, lit. Sokolov House) is the Tel Aviv headquarters of the National Association of Israeli Journalists. Named after journalist Nahum Sokolow, the building was dedicated in his memory in 1957.

Beit Sokolov is also used as a conference hall and a gallery for temporary art exhibitions. The building is located near the "Beit Hasofer" ("Writer's house").

The Israeli Journalists Association sold Beit Sokolow to Reality Real Estate Fund and Phoenix Holdings in 2015.

== See also ==
- Media of Israel

== Books ==
- Zvi Elhyani, Michael Jacobson: Nadler, Nadler, Bixon & Gil, Architecture 1946-2010, 462 pages, Hebrew & English, Public school, 2016
