= Eli Azur =

Israeli businessman

Eli Azur (born 1958) Hebrew: אלי עזור) is an Israeli businessman and the head of Mirkaei Tikshoret, a Tel Aviv-based media company.

== Career ==
Azur started his career as a sportswriter for Hadashot.

Azur is the owner of advertising rights for Israel Plus. With Pini Zahavi, he also runs Charlton, a company which owns broadcasting rights for football matches in Israel.

Through Mirkaei Tikshoret, Azur runs radio stations in Israel and The Jerusalem Post. Canadian investor Leonard Asper sued for a controlling stake in the PostC5 in 2005 after failed negotiations with Azur. The lawsuit was dismissed in 2006. He co-owned the Israel Post, which started publishing in 2007. In 2012, he launched Sof Hashavua, a newspaper only published on Fridays. In 2014, he acquired Maariv, another Israeli newspaper. In 2020, he bought the Walla! internet portal from Bezeq.
