= Moti Ben-Moshe =

Israeli businessman (born 1975)

- מרדכי "מוטי" בן משה
- Born: Mordechai Moshiashvili; April 9, 1975 (age 51); Beersheba, Israel
- Occupation: Businessman
- Spouse: Maya Mudargashvili
- Children: 4

Mordechai Maurice "Moti" Ben-Moshe (Hebrew: מרדכי "מוטי" בן משה; born April 9, 1975) is an Israeli businessman. He is the chairman and CEO of German holding company Extra Holding, which controls Extra Energy. He is also the owner of Alon Blue Square, and briefly served as chairman of IDB Group.

== Personal life ==
Ben-Moshe was born in Beersheba as Mordechai Moshiashvili, to Ya'akov and Atri, olim from Kulashi, Georgia. When he was a baby, the family moved to Lod. Moshiashvili went to Hameiri Elementary in the city, and subsequently to Nehalim Yeshiva next to Petah Tikva, where he studied under Rabbi Menachem Hirsch. His father is a bank manager for Bank Mizrahi-Tefahot in Ramla. He also has a sister named Tzipora Elisha. After graduating from the Yeshiva, Moshiashvili Hebraized his name to Ben-Moshe. He served in the Israel Defense Forces in non-combat roles, and took lessons in computer programming. He later enrolled in Bar Ilan University, but dropped out after two years to focus on business.

Ben-Moshe lives in Modi'in. He is married to Maya Mudargashvili, and has four children.

== Business career ==
In the late 1990s Ben-Moshe founded the billing software company Cyber Gate, where he was one of the software developers. It became successful due to its business model of charging customers based on the latter's revenue, instead of a fixed price. He then emigrated to Germany, where he joined Aldi and sold Internet services through the chain. He partnered with the German subsidiary of Spanish company Telefónica, and went on to purchase Internet infrastructure. This business was done in the shadow of the dot-com bust, which left a lot of Internet infrastructure unused—which Ben-Moshe was able to buy at heavily reduced prices.

Ben-Moshe returned to Israel in 2002. He continued to do business in Germany and Europe through Extra Holding, a holding company that manages his business on the continent. It deals mainly in telecommunication, insurance and energy. In 2008, Ben-Moshe created a fund to engage in renewable energy projects in Israel, together with Yashka Barnim. Barnim left the partnership in 2011. Ben-Moshe also owns a minimarket chain, Kolel Store, and other small and medium businesses in Israel.

=== IDB Group purchase ===
On December 17, 2013, Ben-Moshe and his partner Eduardo Elsztain took over IDB Group, a major Israeli holding company, from Nochi Dankner. Ben-Moshe placed an ILS 600 million guarantee for the deal to go through, and committed to investing over ILS 1 billion more in the company. Prior to the purchase, Ben-Moshe had been virtually unknown in the Israeli business community. At least two legal opinions pertaining to the court deliberations over the IDB sale said that they could not be sure that Ben-Moshe was indeed the sole owner of Extra Holding, casting doubt on his ability to enter as a partner in IDB. However, the court accepted Ben-Moshe's statement that he was the sole owner. According to Ben-Moshe, the expressed doubts were bits of deliberate misinformation coming from Nochi Dankner and his advisors. In May 2015, Elsztain injected additional cash into the ailing IDB, removing Ben-Moshe as co-chairman of the board. The two each wanted to take full control of the group, and following arbitration proceedings, Elsztain bought out Ben-Moshe's shares in the company. Ben-Moshe lost approximately ILS 500 million with IDB.

=== Further business in Israel ===
In 2016, Ben-Moshe purchased yet another holding company, Alon Blue Square, again as part of a debt settlement. In 2017 he decided to buy yet another troubled company, Africa Israel Investments, but after 18 months of negotiations he was beaten out by a partnership of real estate companies Mega Or and Big Shopping Centers. In December 2020, Ben-Moshe offered to purchase Israir for ILS 165 million. However, his bid fell through.

In June 2021, Ben-Moshe acquired control of Global Power, and indirectly of IPM Power Station in Be'er Tuvia.
