= Daniel Dagan =

Israeli journalist and author

Daniel Dagan (Hebrew: דניאל דגן; born 1944 in Cairo) is an Israeli journalist and author.

Daniel Dagan moved with his family from Cairo to France in 1952. A year later he emigrated to Israel. He was brought up in Kibbutz Mishmar HaEmek in the Jezreel Valley, not far from Nazareth.

During his military service, as well as in the reserve, Daniel Dagan worked as a military news correspondent. In this capacity he was among the first Israeli troops who crossed the Suez Canal westwards in the Yom Kippur War of 1973, his first return to the country of his birth.

Dagan graduated in political science and economics from the Tel Aviv University. He also studied in universities and other academic institutions in France, Spain and Germany.

From 1970 through 1977 he was the political correspondent of Maariv (newspaper). From 1978 through 1993 he was with Haaretz, serving most of the time in European capitals. Dagan also worked for Galei Tzahal, (Israel Defense Forces Radio), and for the New York-based Jewish Telegraphic Agency.

Over the years, Dagan has contributed to the Op-Ed pages of The International Herald Tribune and Le Monde (both in Paris), El Mundo (Spain) (Madrid), Die Zeit (Hamburg) and other international newspapers and magazines.

Dagan is now based in Berlin, where he works mainly for the public radio and television station IBA (Israel Broadcasting Authority). He appears frequently on radio and television shows in Germany, mostly commenting on the situation in the Middle East and Europe’s role in the region. He launched his blog in 2009.

Dagan is a founding member of the Board of Trustees of Bonn International School (BIS) as well as board member of the Association of the Foreign Press in Germany (VAP) and of the Brussels-based Association of European Journalists.

Dagan is married and has a daughter, Miriam, and a son, David.
