= Extra Energy =

Independent retail energy supplier in the United Kingdom

Extra Energy Supply Ltd.
- Logo in 2018
- Company type: Utility company
- Founded: 2014
- Defunct: 2018
- Headquarters: Birmingham, United Kingdom
- Key people: Moti Ben-Moshe (Owner)
- Website: www.extra-energy.co.uk

Extra Energy Supply Ltd (trading as extraenergy) was an independent retail energy supplier based in Birmingham, England. It supplied gas and electricity to domestic and small business customers. Extra Energy was part of Extra Holding, which operates in industries including telecoms, travel, insurance and energy.

== History ==
The company was launched in the United Kingdom in April 2014 and by October of that year was the fastest-growing energy supplier in the country.

Extra Energy was founded and solely owned by Moti Ben-Moshe. The company launched in Germany in 2008, where it had more than two million customers by 2014.

The energy supplier consistently featured in "best buy" tables since it launched into the UK market by offering the best dual fuel tariffs, although it drew 1,682 complaints per 100,000 customers in the first three months of 2016, according to figures from Citizens Advice, which said this was "the highest complaints ratio ever recorded" in the five years since it began compiling league tables.

The company appointed Ben Jones, previously CEO of BES Utilities, as managing director of operations in 2015, and hired Richard Rose, formerly director of financial control at RWE npower, as chief financial officer.

On 21 November 2018, Extra Energy ceased trading. The regulator OFGEM automatically protected supplies and assigned Scottish Power as the replacement provider for existing customers after a competitive process. The next month, Mike Denny, Matthew Hammond and Ian Green of PricewaterhouseCoopers LLP were appointed as joint administrators of Extra Energy.
