= Hadashot =

- Type: Daily
- Owner: Haaretz Group
- Founded: March 1984
- Ceased publication: December 1993
- Language: Hebrew

Hadashot (Hebrew: חדשות, lit. 'News') was a Hebrew-language daily newspaper published in Israel between 1984 and 1993.

== History ==
On 4 March 1984 Haaretz Group CEO Amos Schocken announced that a new daily newspaper, Hadashot was to be launched, with Yossi Klein as editor. It was one of the first Israeli newspapers to use colour printing.

The paper was soon hit by a scandal as it published details of the Kav 300 affair, in which Shin Bet members executed two Palestinian bus hijackers in 1984, in violation of the Israeli Military Censor. Having decided not to join the Editors Committee, Hadashot published a story stating that an investigative committee had been formed to look into the incident. As a result, the censor closed the paper for three days from 29 April 1984 for not sending the information about the article. Although the paper was cleared of all charges in 1993, the closure damaged the momentum the paper had gained.

Hadashot initially had a young, left-wing, anti-establishment image, and was written in youthful Hebrew, bordering on slang. The paper's approach was inconsistent; sometimes yellow, sometimes highbrow. In later years it became more conservative. Circulation remained low and at a press conference on 29 November 1993, Schocken announced the closure of the paper. The last edition was published on 29 December 1993, with the paper having made a cumulative loss of around $20 million.

Senior journalists at the newspaper included Amnon Dankner, Dudu Geva, Dahn Ben-Amotz and Irit Linur. Photojournalist Alex Levac also contributed to the newspaper. Journalist Gideon Kouts also contributed under the pen name " Dan Giladi".
