= Dudu Geva =

Israeli cartoonist, illustrator and comic book creator

Dudu Geva דודו גבע
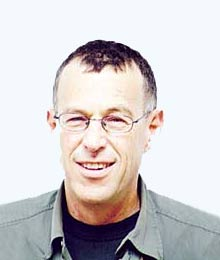
- Dudu Geva, 2005
- Born: Dudu Geva; March 14, 1950 Jerusalem
- Died: February 15, 2005 (aged 54)
- Areas: Artist, writer, cartoonist, illustrator, and comic book creator

Dudu Geva (Hebrew: דודו גבע; born March 14, 1950, died February 15, 2005) was an Israeli cartoonist, illustrator, and comic book creator.

== Biography ==
David (Dudu) Geva was born in Jerusalem. He began his artistic career at the age of 17, writing for the weekly children's newspaper Haaretz Shelanu. While serving in the Israel Defense Forces, Geva drew cartoons for its newspaper Bamahane. After his military service, Geva joined the staff of Israel TV's Channel One as a graphic designer.

Geva died on February 15, 2005, of a heart attack. He left an ex-wife and two children.

== Art career ==
Geva published cartoons, comic strips and satire columns in Israel's leading newspapers: Haolam Hazeh ("Zoo-Aretz-Zoo"), Hadashot ("The Song of the Duck"), HaIr ("Joseph and his Brothers", "The Silence of the Duck"), Kol HaIr ("Ahalan and Sahalan"), Maariv ("The Road to Happiness", "Geva's Journal") and Haaretz ("The Weekly Caricature").

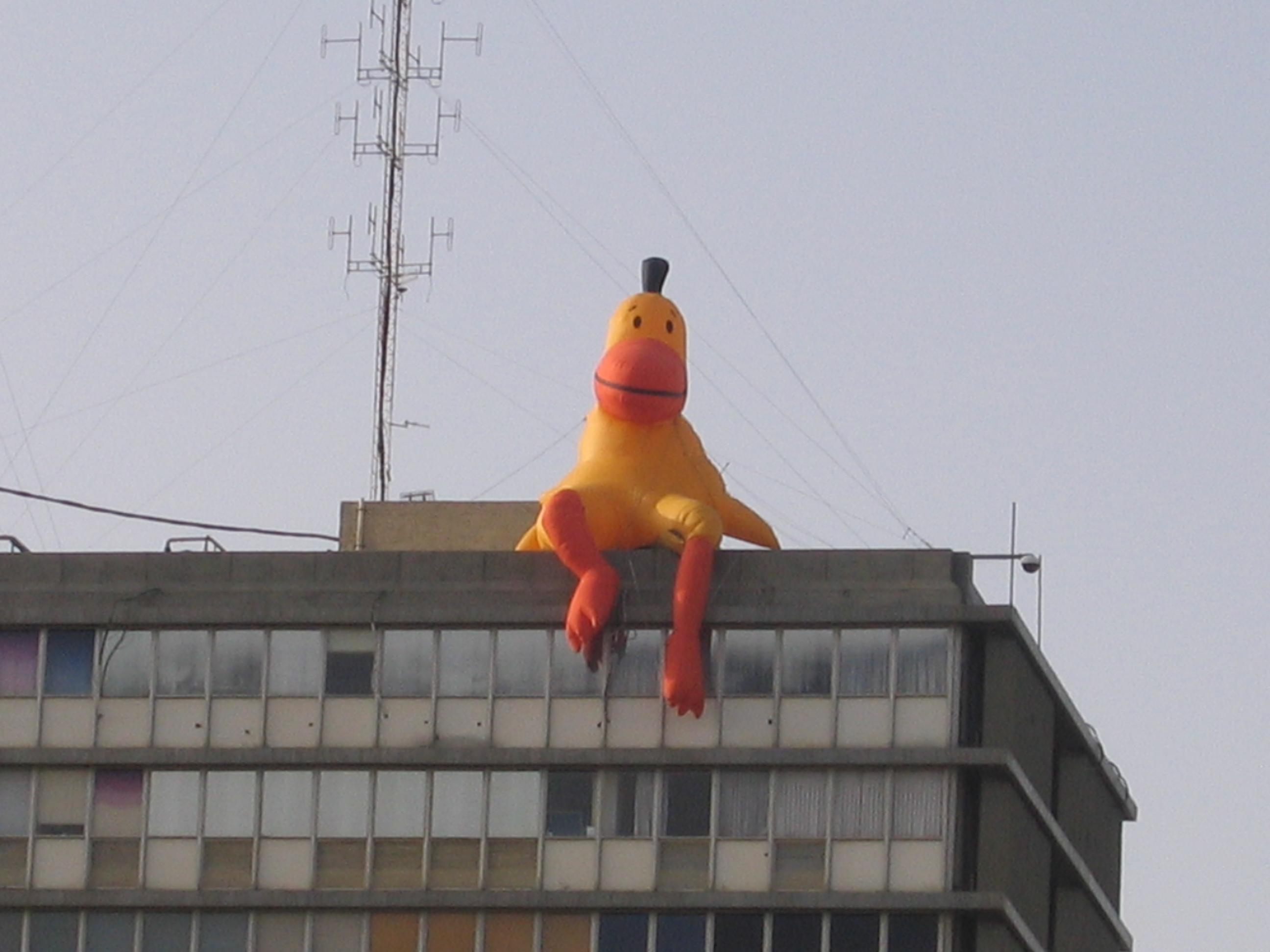
Inflatable duck on the roof of the Tel Aviv city hall (2008)

In addition to his work in journalism, Geva produced dozens of comic books and illustrated children's books in collaboration with many of Israel's writers and artists. Among his most well-known fictional characters was Joseph and the duck.

In 1991, Disney sued Geva for publishing a snippet from his forthcoming monograph, The Duck Book in a local Tel Aviv newspaper. In his cartoon strip “Moby Duck,” the duck looked very much like Donald Duck with a forelock and a hat. Geva was charged with violating Disney's copyright.

== Legacy and commemoration ==
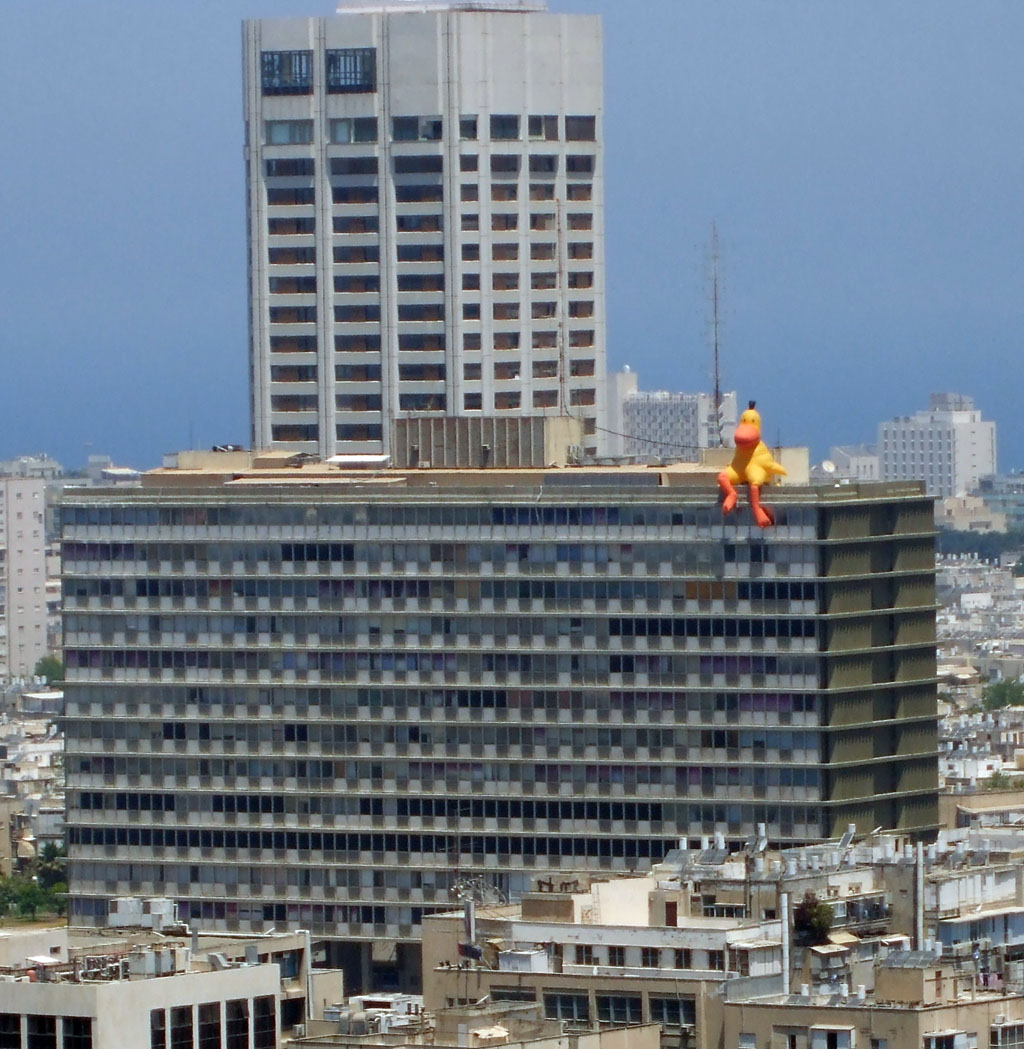
Inflatable duck atop the Tel Aviv city hall roof seen from afar (2008)

In homage to Geva, a giant inflatable duck was installed overlooking Rabin Square from the Tel Aviv Municipality building.

== Published works ==
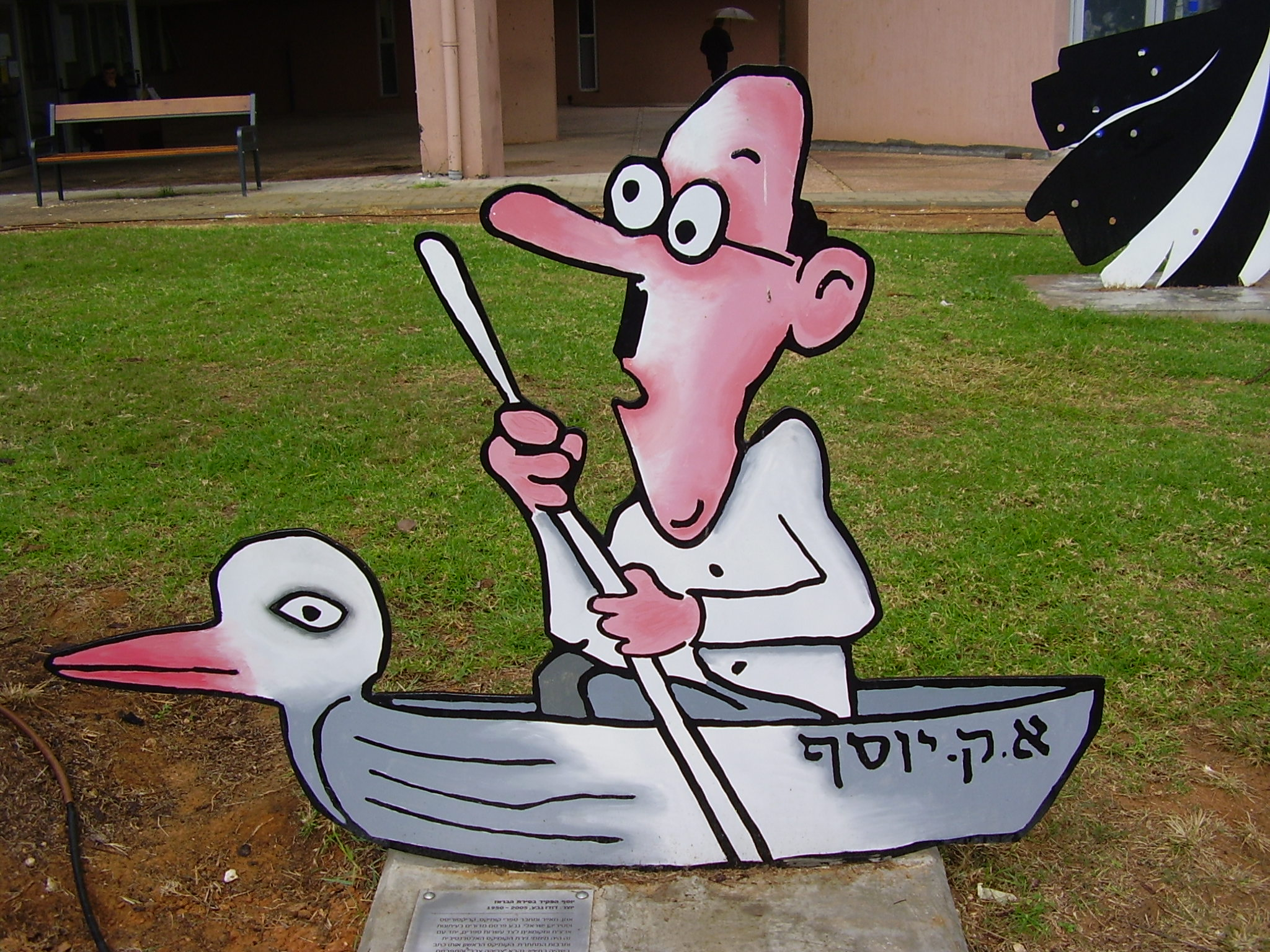

- Zoo-Aretz-Zoo (1975)
- The Knight Zick (1976) with Hanoch Marmari
- Ridiculous Book (1981) with Kobi Niv
- Son of Ridiculous (1983) with Kobi Niv
- Kotz in the Potz (1984)
- Ahalan and Sahalan in the Wild West (1985) with Kobi Niv
- Dwarf in the Pants (1985)
- Ridiculous Strikes Again (1985) with Kobi Niv
- The Journal of the Clerk (1987)
- The Duck (1994)
- The Knight Zick in the Torah Wise Men Land (2002)
- The Knight Zick in his War against the Routine (2002)
- The Knight Zick in the Kingdom of old Legends (2002)
- The Knight Zick and the Princess of the Nile (2002)
- A4 Booklets (2003)
- Cheap Literature Booklet (2005)
- The Silence of the Duck (2005)

== See also ==
- Israeli art
