= Hannah Semer =

Israeli journalist (1924–2003)

- חנה זמר
- Hanna Semer, May 1977
- Born: Hannah Haberfeld; October 2, 1924; Bratislava, Czechoslovakia
- Died: March 6, 2003 (aged 78); Tel Aviv, Israel
- Other names: Hanna Zomer; Hanna Zemer
- Occupation: Journalist
- Employer: Davar
- Title: Editor in Chief
- Awards: 1972 Sokolow Award; 1975 Israeli Woman of the Year; Herzl Award; Nordau Prize; Ted Lurie Prize; 1993 B'nai B'rith Wolf Matsdorf Award; Hadassah award for outstanding women

Hannah Semer (Hebrew: חנה זמר; October 2, 1924 – March 6, 2003) was an Israeli journalist. She was Editor in Chief of Davar from 1970 until 1990, the first female editor in chief of a major Israeli daily newspaper.

== Biography ==
Hannah Haberfeld (later Semer) was born in a German-speaking Jewish family in Bratislava. Her father was Rabbi Shlomo Haberfeld, and her grandfather, Rabbi Jacob Haberfeld, was the rabbi of Turá Lúka. Her family was ultra-Orthodox.

During World War II, she was imprisoned at the Ravensbrück and Malchow concentration camps. Most of her family was killed in the Holocaust.

Zemer immigrated to Israel in 1950. She was married briefly, and changed her married name from Zomer to Semer. She taught in the Orthodox Bais Yaakov (Beth Jacob) school system in Azor, southeast of Tel Aviv.

== Media career ==
Semer began working as a night editor for a German-language Israeli newspaper, Yediot HaYom in 1950. In 1951 she was hired as a correspondent by the daily newspaper Omer, for new immigrants (with Hebrew vowels), which was a supplement of Davar. She then became a writer for Davar, and became its political affairs correspondent.

In 1961, she became director of Davar’s editorial board. Over time, she became a radio and television host. She advanced to become Davar’s assistant editor, and in 1970 became its Editor-in-Chief, which at the time was the most senior position held by a woman in Israeli media. She remained as Editor in Chief for 20 years—the first female to hold the editor in chief title at a Hebrew newspaper. Semer retired from Davar in 1990.

Semer also wrote entries for Encyclopaedia Judaica, and was elected to the board of the International Institute of Journalism.

== Awards and recognition ==
Semer won the 1970 Herzl Award for journalism, the 1972 Sokolow Award (awarded by Tel Aviv University), the title of 1975 Israeli Woman of the Year, the Herzl Award, the Nordau Prize, the Ted Lurie Prize, B'nai B'rith's 1993 Wolf Matsdorf Award for journalism, the Hadassah Women's Organization's award for outstanding women.

== Published works ==
God Doesn't Live Here Anymore is about her return visit to the Ravensbrück concentration camp:

On my travels abroad, and especially my trips to Germany, I am very careful not to eat treif. It’s a sort of demonstration of solidarity. But here at the doorway, at Ravensbrück, I would have eaten pork if I could have eaten at all. I would have eaten steak with cheese to take revenge on God for the deaths of my aunts and cousins, who counted the days of their niddah time according to the law, separated hallah from the dough, ran to the dayyan with questions about a spot on a slaughtered goose, and read from the Ze’enah U-Re’enah every free moment—and their reward was to be humiliated to the dust and tortured until they perished. Five minutes from Ravensbrück, I would even have eaten a baby goat cooked in its mother’s milk. Instead, I took a Valium.
