= Maariv (newspaper) =

Israeli newspaper

- Maariv front page
- Type: Daily newspaper
- Format: Tabloid
- Owner: Eli Azur
- Editor: Doron Cohen; Golan Bar-Yosef
- Founded: 1948
- Political alignment: Centrist
- Language: Hebrew
- Headquarters: Tel Aviv, Israel
- Country: Israel
- Circulation: About 90,000
- Website: www.maariv.co.il

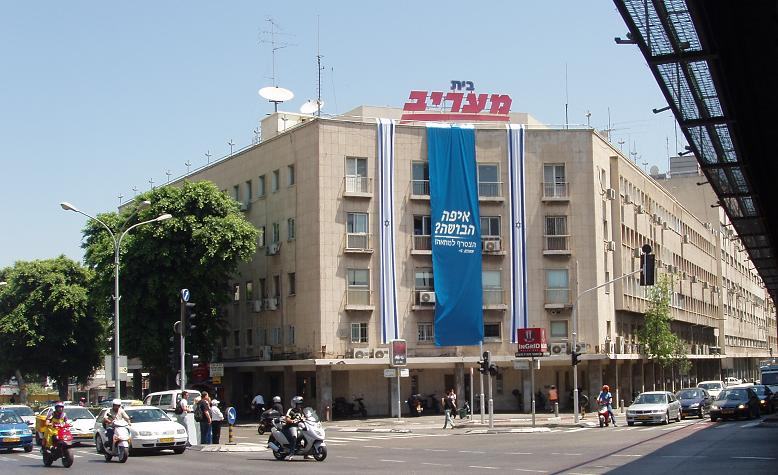
Maariv House at the Maariv intersection in Tel Aviv

First edition of Maariv, 1948

Maariv (Hebrew: מַעֲרִיב, lit. 'bringing on evening') is a Hebrew-language daily newspaper published in Israel.

From Sunday to Thursday, it is printed under the Ma'ariv Hashavu'a (Hebrew: מַעֲרִיב הַשָּׁבוּעַ) brand, while the weekend edition that is out on Friday is called Ma'ariv SofHashavu'a (Hebrew: מַעֲרִיב סוּפְהַשָּׁבוּעַ). A daily, abridged version of the newspaper, called Ma'ariv Haboker (Hebrew: מעריב הבוקר), is distributed for free every morning during the week. Ma'ariv Haboker is the fourth largest Israeli newspaper in terms of readership (after Israel HaYom, Yedioth Ahronoth and Haaretz).

Since May 2014, Maariv's co-editors in chief are Doron Cohen and Golan Bar-Yosef. Apart from the daily newspaper and its supplements, Maariv has a chain of local newspapers with a national-scale distribution and magazine division.

== History ==
Maariv was founded in 1948 by former Yediot Aharonot journalists led by Dr. Ezriel Carlebach, who became Maariv's first editor-in-chief. It was the most widely read newspaper in Israel in its first twenty years.

For many years, the Nimrodi family held a controlling stake in Maariv, and Yaakov Nimrodi served as its chairman. In March 2010, Zaki Rakib bought a 50% share from Israel Land Development Company and Ofer Nimrodi, bringing new energy and a much needed cash infusion to the newspaper, which had been losing millions of NIS a year since 2004. Rakib became the new chairman.

However, it was announced in March 2011 that Nochi Dankner was to take control of Maariv through his Discount Investment. On 25 March, Discount transferred 20 million NIS to the struggling firm. On 11 September, Maariv's chairman Dani Yakobi issued a statement that he would sell the newspaper's printing equipment to be able to pay September salaries. On 7 September, Globes announced that Dankner had reached an agreement with Shlomo Ben-Zvi, publisher of Makor Rishon, to buy out the newspaper. However, the deal faltered, and Dankner turned to the court on 23 September for a stay of the proceedings' process. The court appointed a trustee, Shlomo Nass, who ran the newspaper and searched for a buyer. During the following weeks the workers waged a campaign against IDB and Dankner, demanding he honor his obligations to them and pay their salaries, pensions and severance packages in full.

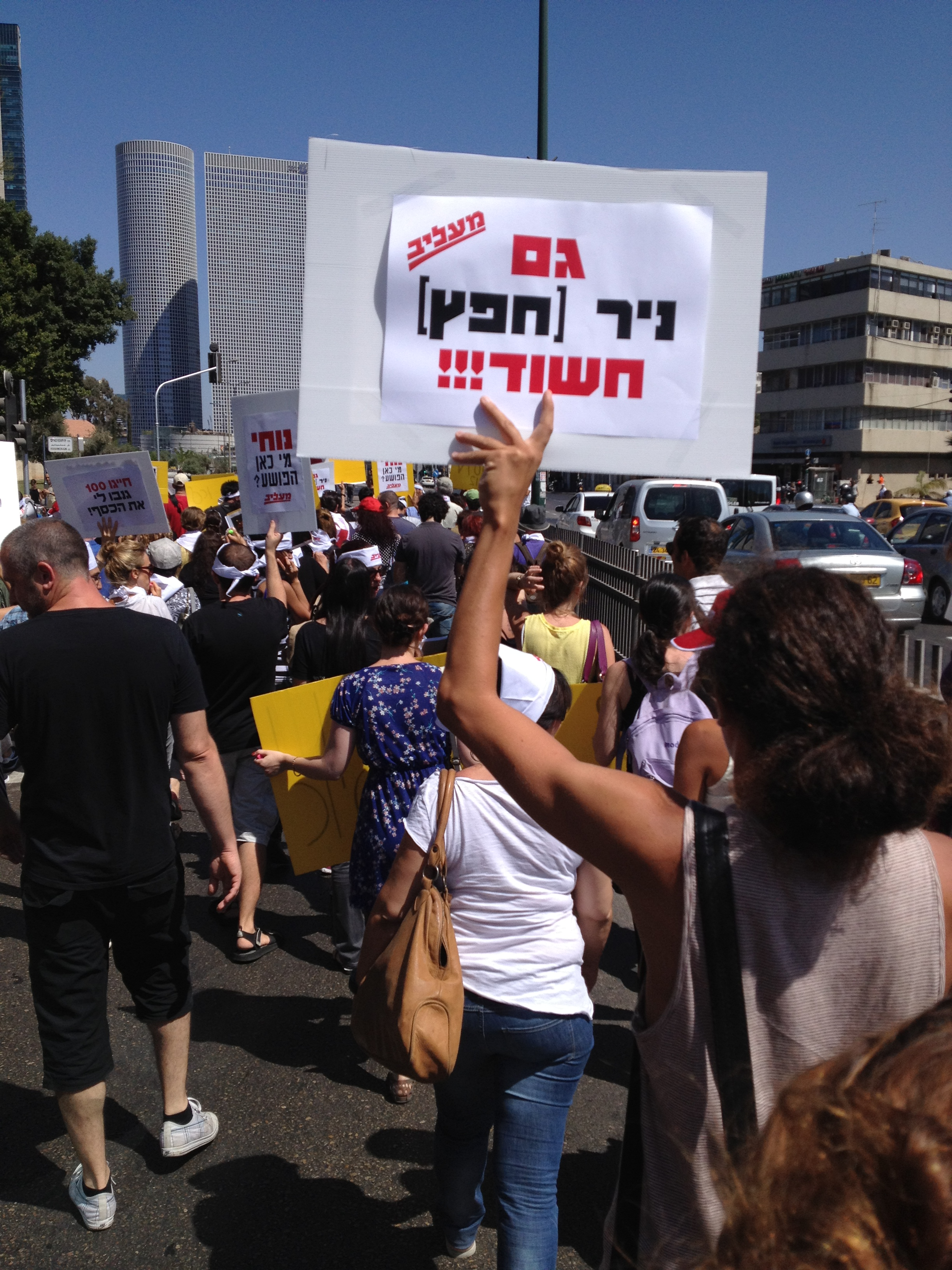
Maariv workers marching towards the IDB offices in Tel Aviv, September 2012

In early November the trustee sold the newspaper to Ben Zvi without the debts or the workers. Ben Zvi kept a fraction of the journalists and commenced a partial convergence process between Maariv and Makor Rishon under his company, Makor Rishon Hatzofe Hameuchad.

As of January 2013, the company Maariv Modiin Ltd. no longer operates Maariv, and until its scheduled closure it was to be operated by the court-appointed trustee.

In March 2014, after a long struggle to stabilize the company, Ben Zvi turned to the municipal Jerusalem court for a stay of proceedings process. Maariv closed most of its departments and published only a thin version, until the court-appointed trustee could find a new owner. In May 2014 the brand was purchased by Eli Azur, who has holdings in a number of media outlets in Israel, including The Jerusalem Post, Sport1, Israel Post and 103FM radio station. A few days after the deal was approved, Azur relaunched the daily newspaper as Maariv-Hashavua, and a weekend edition called Maariv-Sofhashavua, which is an amalgamation of Maariv and the group's weekend magazine Sofhashavua.

== Political orientation ==
In 2012, Maariv, associated with Israel's political center, was critical of Benjamin Netanyahu's center-right government.

Moshe Arens, in a Haaretz opinion piece penned in 2012, wrote that the owner of Maariv had resolved a few years earlier to steer the newspaper leftward, "forsaking the right-wing readership that was loyal to it for years".

== Circulation ==
In a TGI survey for the first half of 2012, Maariv's market share was 11.9 percent. Until 2013 Maariv owned a printing house, which was sold to the newspaper Yisrael Hayom to cover the newspaper's big debts. Since then Maariv has outsourced the printing operations to other printing houses.

As of 31 July 2023, a TGI survey indicated that Israel Hayom, distributed for free, is Israel's most-read newspaper, with a 29.4% weekday readership exposure, followed by Yedioth Ahronoth, with 22.3%, Haaretz with 4.8%, Globes with 4% and Maariv with 3.9%.

== Supplements ==
- Weekdays:
  - Hamagazine – daily magazine, including culture and entertainment, crosswords, television and radio listings; used to include opinions
  - Asakim – financial section
  - Sport section
- Tuesday
  - Signon – home magazine
- Wednesday
  - Signon – fashion magazine
- Friday
  - Musafshabat – in-depth political analysis and commentary
  - Sofshavua – weekend magazine
  - Journal – culture and entertainment, TV and radio listings
  - Asakim – financial magazine
  - At – YOU, women's magazine
  - A local affiliated weekly newspaper, depending on the region

== Notable journalists ==
=== Present ===
- Menachem Ben – literature critic, publicist
- Mordechai Haimovich – magazine writer
- Tzipi Hotovely – columnist
- Kalman Liebskind – journalist and columnist
- Avi Ratzon – sport commentator
- Ruvik Rosenthal – Hebrew language columnist
- Erel Segal – columnist
- Ben-Dror Yemini – publicist (politics)
- Ben Caspit - journalist and columnist

=== Past ===
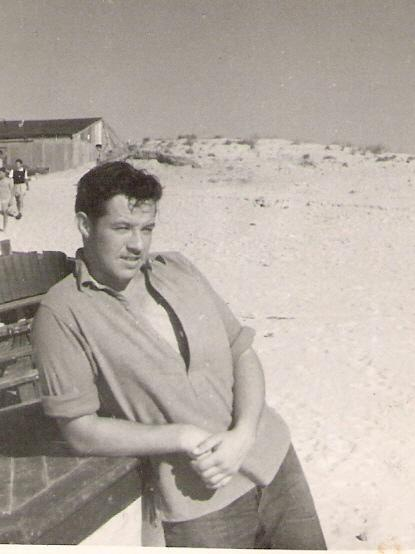
Dahn Ben-Amotz

- Yehonatan Geffen – columnist (deceased)
- Dahn Ben Amotz – humor, culture, gossip (deceased)
- Kobi Arieli – satirist
- Ben Caspit – political and diplomatic analyst
- Daniel Dagan - political correspondent
- Amnon Dankner – chief editor (deceased)
- Jacob Farkas ("Ze'ev") – cartoonist (deceased)
- Kariel Gardosh ("Dosh") – cartoonist, creator of the "Srulik" ("little Israel") character (deceased)
- Dudu Geva – humor and satire (deceased)
- Jacky Hugi – Arab and Middle East correspondent
- Ephraim Kishon – humor and satire (deceased)
- Gideon Kouts - Europe and Paris correspondent (deceased)
- Tommy Lapid – editor, turned to politics and returned to the paper as a publicist (deceased)
- Ron Maiberg – columnist
- Dan Margalit – political columnist (deceased)
- Ofer Shelach – political, military and diplomatic analyst, sport commentator
- Meir Shnitzer – TV and film critic

== Notable people ==
- Doron Galezer (born 1952), former chief executive editor

== See also ==
- List of newspapers in Israel
