= Alon Blue Square =

Israeli company

- Founded: 1932
- Headquarters: Yakum, Israel
- Key people: Moti Ben-Moshe (owner); Avigdor Kaplan (chairman); Israel Yaniv (CEO)
- Revenue: NIS 4.8 billion (2018)
- Net income: NIS 179 million (2018)
- Website: www.bsi.co.il

Alon Blue Square (Hebrew: אלון רבוע כחול, Alon Ribu'a Kahol), formerly Blue Square, is a private Israeli holding company, owned by Moti Ben-Moshe, and based in Yakum. It was founded as a retail chain, but subsequently branched out into real estate and other fields.

== History ==
Alon Blue Square dates back to 1932, when it was founded as the Tel Aviv Cooperative Consumer Association. This and other cooperative consumer clubs were run by the Consumer Cooperation Union, in turn run by HaMashbir HaMerkazi. In 1970, all grocery store clubs formed a union, owing to the desire to unify grocery prices across the country for unionized workers. In 1972, the Tel Aviv club merged with the clubs from the Sharon region, Ashkelon and Beersheba. Later in the decade, the unified group became called Co-Op The Blue Square, with Benny Gaon appointed as its executive director. The group had a revenue of IL2.5 billion. In 1987, the company became the Israeli franchisee of Wendy's, reaching six branches, but failed.

The cooperative founded a new business in 1991, called Co-Op Blue Square Consumer Cooperative Society Limited, in which it held an 82% stake. At the time, the company employed about 3,000 workers. The company expanded its reach significantly in the 1990s, founding the Super Center supermarket chain. It also operated the Hamashbir Lazarchan, bought and the Home Center hardware and household goods chain, had plans to sell Dunkin' Donuts in the Co-Op branches, and it owned the franchise rights for operating IKEA in Israel, but was forced to sell them. In the 2000s Blue Square operated Sbarro and Pelephone stands in its stores and it also founded the Mega chain, geared toward its Buy and Bonus club members. In 2002, Blue Square entered the online retail business, with the Blue Center brand.

In 1996 the cooperative's holdings and the for-profit company merged into Blue Square Israel, and had a public offering in New York under that name. In November 2000 it also had a public offering in Israel. This privatization was initiated by various members of the cooperative, who had been forced to buy its shares decades earlier, but largely weren't invested in its ideology. By the 1990s they had wanted to sell their shares on the free market, and this was only possible through privatization. In 2002, most of the members voted to dismantle the company and sell its assets.

In 2003, Blue Square Israel was purchased by Alon Group, owner of the energy company Dor Alon, for NIS 1.4 billion, and became Alon Blue Square.

In 2015, Alon Blue Square encountered financial difficulties. The Mega supermarket chain owned by the company went into receivership, and the latter became insolvent. In 2016, Alon Blue Square was fully acquired by Moti Ben-Moshe and became a private company. In December 2019, Alon Blue Square acquired the Gindi family's 50% stake in TLV Fashion Mall, a shopping mall in Tel Aviv, for NIS 225 million, making it the sole owner of the property. As of 2020, the company is one of the bidders for a 20% stake in Israel Post.

== Holdings and subsidiaries ==
Alon Blue Square has two main subsidiaries: the energy company Dor Alon, and Blue Square Real Estate. Other than these, the company full or partially owns multiple retail chains, including Mega Home, Na'aman, Vardinon and others. It also has holdings in the radio station 103fm.

Prior to 2015, the company also had holdings in the retail chains Doctor Baby (owned by Mega) and Kfar HaSha'ashu'im, the mobile virtual network operator YouPhone the local Diners Club franchise, and the Israel Post newspaper.

== Criticism ==
=== Involvement in Israeli settlements ===
On 12 February 2020, the United Nations published a database of companies doing business related in the West Bank, including East Jerusalem, as well as in the occupied Golan Heights. Alon Blue Square was listed on the database on account of its activities in Israeli settlements in these occupied territories, which are considered illegal under international law.
