= Israel Post =

Israeli newspaper

- Type: Daily
- Format: Tabloid
- Owner(s): Eli Azur; David Weisman
- Editor: Golan Bar Yosef
- Founded: 2007
- Language: Hebrew
- Headquarters: Tel Aviv, Israel
- Country: Israel

Israel Post (Hebrew: ישראל פוסט), originally Metro Israel, was an Israeli Hebrew-language free daily newspaper that existed between 2007 and 2016. It was based on the concept of the Metro newspapers. Co-owned by Eli Azur (who owns controlling interest in The Jerusalem Post) and David Weisman, it was first published on August 5, 2007. It was Israel's only afternoon newspaper and distributed mainly in establishments owned by Weisman, such as Blue Square supermarkets, the AM-PM convenience stores and Dor-Alon gas stations. Part of the material is translated from the English-language Jerusalem Post and The Business Post newspapers. Most of the advertisements during the preliminary period were of Weisman's businesses.

In July 2010, a TGI survey of the media reported that Israel Post had overtaken Haaretz as the fourth largest newspaper in terms of exposure with a rate of 7.6% versus Haaretz's rate of only 6.5%. Israel Post was distributed for free around Israel.

The publishing company was Metro Israel Ltd., located in Tel Aviv. The chief editor was Golan Bar Yosef.

== See also ==
- List of newspapers in Israel
