= Amnon Dankner =

Israeli newspaper editor (1946–2013)

- אמנון דנקנר
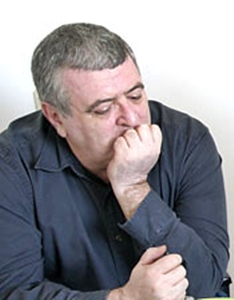
- Born: February 5, 1946; Jerusalem, Palestine
- Died: April 5, 2013 (aged 67)
- Occupation: Newspaper editor
- Employer: Maariv
- Spouse: Miri
- Children: 2

Amnon Dankner (Hebrew: אמנון דנקנר; February 5, 1946 – April 5, 2013) was an Israeli newspaper editor and author. He was the editor of the mass-circulation daily Maariv for six years.

== Biography ==
Amnon Dankner was born in Jerusalem. His parents were the owners of Cafe Allenby. The family was secular, but he attended a religious school, Ma'aleh, where he was a classmate of Haim Be'er. He served in the Nahal corps and studied law at the Hebrew University of Jerusalem. He was married to Miri, with whom he had two sons, Yoav and Itai. Although he preferred Jerusalem, at his wife's insistence he lived in Ramat Hasharon.

On 5 April 2013, at the age of 67, he died in his home from cardiac arrest. He is survived by his wife, two sons and five grandchildren.

== Journalistic and literary career ==
In the 1970s, Dankner was the spokesman of the Israeli Ministry of Education and the Jewish Agency. He was a reporter for Haaretz, the Washington correspondent for Davar, a columnist for Hadashot and the editor-in-chief of Maariv from 2002 to 2007. He was one of the hosts of the Israeli political talk show Popolitika.

In 1992, Dankner published a biography of Dahn Ben-Amotz that stirred up a major controversy.

== Published works ==
- Don't Shoot the President
- Berman, Why Do You Do That to Me
- The Summer of Rina Oster
- Sherman's Winter
- The Boneless
- Aunt Eva, His Nights and Days
