= Vesti (Israeli newspaper) =

Russian-language daily newspaper published in Israel

Vesty

- Type: Daily newspaper
- Format: compact
- Owner: Yedioth Ahronoth Group
- Founded: 1992
- Political alignment: Right-wing
- Language: Russian
- Headquarters: Tel Aviv, Israel
- Country: Israel
- Website: Vesti

Vesty (Russian: Вести, "News") was an Israeli Russian-language daily newspaper. Based in Tel Aviv, the paper was Israel's most widely read Russian-language paper and the last remaining daily paper in Russian. The paper was started in 1992 by Yedioth Ahronoth Group, which remains its owner. It was very widely read in the 1990s. However, its sales had slumped, and in 2017 it was turned into a weekly newspaper, with a Russian-language website built, based on Ynet. In December 2018, the newspaper went out of print. The paper was edited by the refusenik Eduard Kuznetsov from 1992 to 1999.

== Circulation ==
In 1996 Vesty was read by around 200,000 people. Since the 1990s sales of Russian-language papers in Israel have fallen sharply as emigration from Russian-speaking countries has slowed and immigrants who arrived earlier have switched to Hebrew papers. Israeli newspaper sales have also declined across the board, largely due to the internet. Vesti's sales have fallen significantly, forcing it to take cost-cutting measures, including dropping its earlier broadsheet format for a compact format in 2004. In 2005 its claimed top circulation was 55,000. It employed 50 journalists in 2001.

In 1994 the paper cost 0.60 shekels ($0.20), a third the cost of the Hebrew papers Yedioth Ahronoth and Maariv, reflecting its relatively poor immigrant readership.

== Content and personnel ==
Vesty has a right-wing editorial stance, like Israeli Russian-language media in general. in 1999 it was described as "rightist-to-center on the peace process, and close to Likud on internal issues". It supported Natan Sharansky in Israel's 1996 elections. The Israeli academic Tamar Horowitz states that the paper, and the Russian press in general, played an important role in those elections: "It was Vesti that defined Netanyahu's success in the 1996 elections. The voice of the Labor Party was absent from the pages of the Russian newspapers. Had there been a Labor equivalent to Vesti, the results would have been very different." In 1997 Vesti's readers chose Avigdor Lieberman as "Politician of the Year". The paper strongly opposed disengagement from Gaza in 2005. Each day the paper included a supplement on a different topic: health, home life, sports, etc.

Vesti was edited by one of its founders, the right-wing Soviet refusenik Eduard Kuznetsov, until he was fired in December 1999. Many people attributed a political motive to Kuznetsov's firing, although Vesti denied this. At the time The Jerusalem Post reported anonymous claims that Kuznetsov had been fired for his criticism of Sharansky's Yisrael BaAliyah party, or even at the party's request, while Religious Zionist news outlet Arutz Sheva stated that an advisor to Ehud Barak "was reportedly instrumental in bringing about Kuznetsov's dismisal [sic]". The Zionist Forum and the right-wing group Professors for a Strong Israel protested the firing. Kuznetsov was succeeded by Vera Yedidia, also the presenter of a program on Israeli public television.

Vesti managing editor Yulia Shamalov-Berkovich, another of the paper's founders, later became a Kadima politician, joining the Knesset in 2009.

=== Main editors ===
- Eduard Kuznetsov (chief editor 1992–1999)
- Alexander Vladimirovich Averbukh (economic editor 1993–2001)
- Alexander Dubinsky (economic editor 2002–present)
- Ilya Naymark (chief editor 1999–2001)
- Vera Edidya (chief editor 2001–2002)
- Lev Baltsan (chief editor 2002–2005)
- Sergey Podrazhansky (acting chief editor 2005–2007)
- Anna Sadagurskaya (chief editor 2007–2014)
- Danny Spektor (chief editor 2014–present)

== Cases ==
In 2006 the paper's opinion page editor and one of its writers were taken to court over an allegedly racist poem it had published.

In 2008 the Russian newspaper Kommersant sued it for republishing their articles without permission or adequate attribution. Reprinting articles published elsewhere is a common practice of the Russian language press in Israel and elsewhere, and Vesti had faced similar complaints in the past.

== See also ==
- 1990s Post-Soviet aliyah
