= Dan Ben-Amotz =

Israeli radio broadcaster, journalist, playwright, and author

- דן בן אמוץ
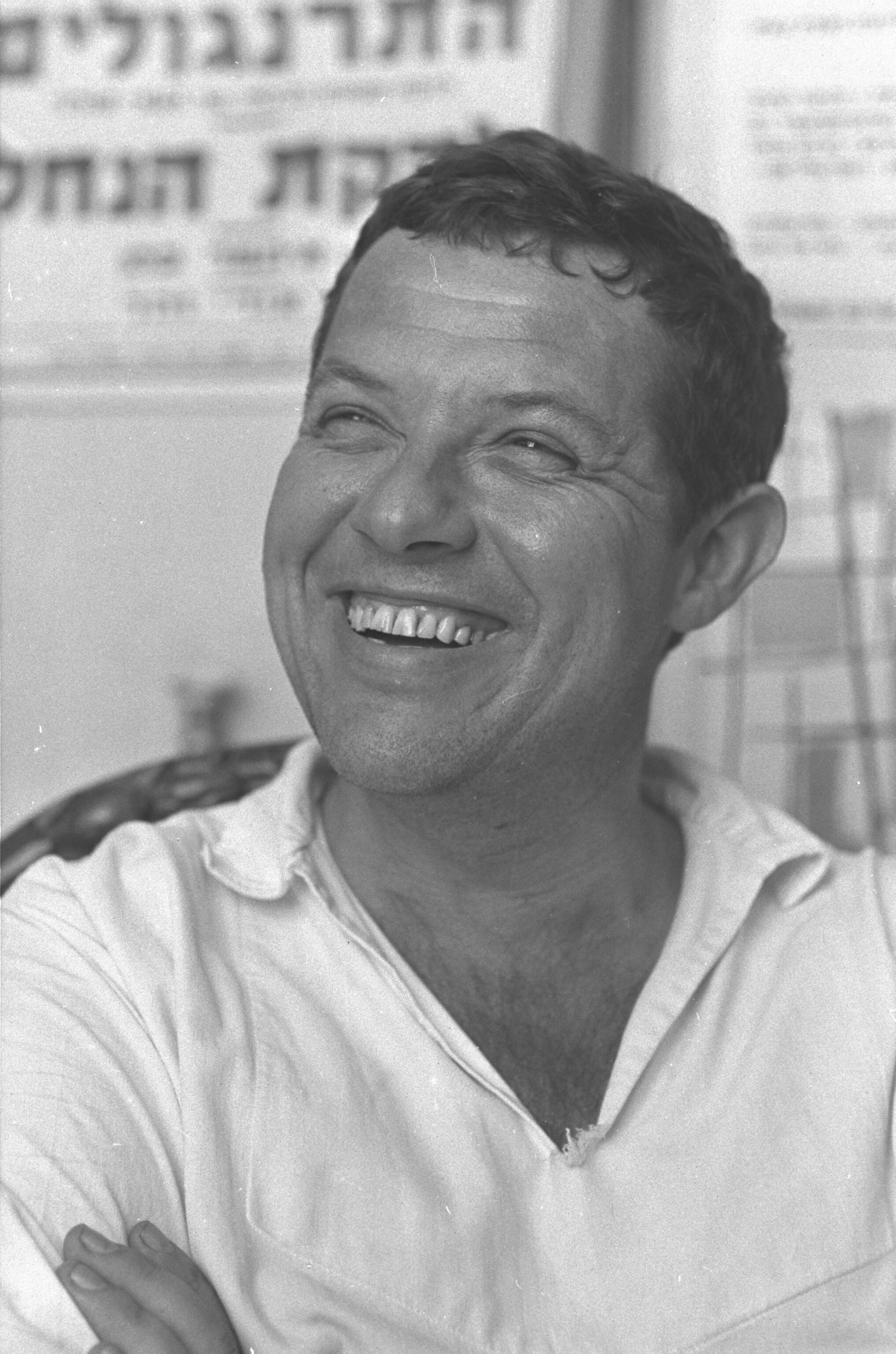
- Born: Moshe Tehilimzeigger; 13 April 1924; Równe, Poland
- Died: 20 October 1989 (aged 65); Jaffa, Israel
- Occupations: radio broadcaster, journalist, playwright, author
- Writing career
- Period: 1950s–1980s

Dan Ben-Amotz (Hebrew: דן בן אמוץ; April 13, 1924 – October 20, 1989) was an Israeli radio broadcaster, journalist, playwright, and author, as well as a former Palmach member. Despite having immigrated from Poland in 1938, he was often considered the epitome of the "Sabra", a native born Israeli Jew.

== Biography ==
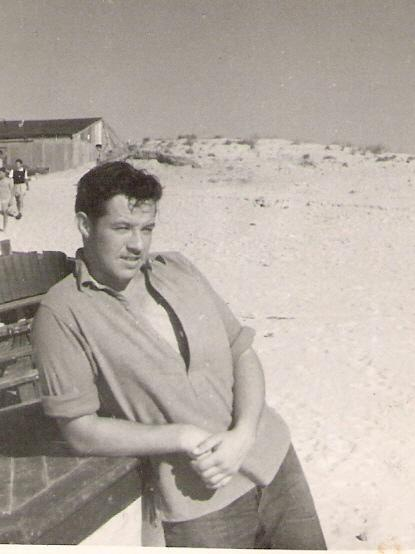
Dan Ben-Amotz in Sdot Yam, 1946

Moshe Tehilimzeigger (later Dan Ben-Amotz) was born in Równe (then in Poland, now in Ukraine). He was sent to the British Mandate for Palestine by his parents in 1938. His parents were murdered in the Holocaust.

In Palestine he was sent to Ben Shemen Youth Village, where his counselor was Shimon Peres. He changed his name to Moshe Shimony and later to Dan Ben-Amotz, feeling the latter had the right sabra sound. Reinventing his personal history to portray himself as a true native sabra, Ben-Amotz claimed to be an orphan who had relatives in some of the older Zionist settlements.

In the 1940s, Ben-Amotz served in the Palmah and joined the Palyam during the 1947–48 Civil War in Mandatory Palestine.

== Media and literary career ==
Amotz spent the years of the 1948 Arab-Israeli War in Europe as a national emissary. After the war he worked for a short while as a Paris correspondent for Israeli papers. He then traveled to the United States and went to Hollywood. He made friends with Marlon Brando and Blackie Dammett, Anthony Kiedis's father, and had a small part in A Streetcar Named Desire (1951).

In the 1950s Ben-Amotz returned to Israel. He was the star of the radio show "Three Men in a Boat", a weekly satirical review that became the country's most popular show, and wrote regularly for Israeli newspapers. In 1956 he published A Bag of Fibs with Haim Hefer, a collection of tall stories from the Palmah folklore, which gained cult status.

According to the Los Angeles Times, "Ben-Amotz was one of the pioneers in the revival of modern Hebrew from a dormant language of prayer and study. He authored a dictionary of Hebrew slang and wrote articles and novels that shocked many Israelis with their frankness."

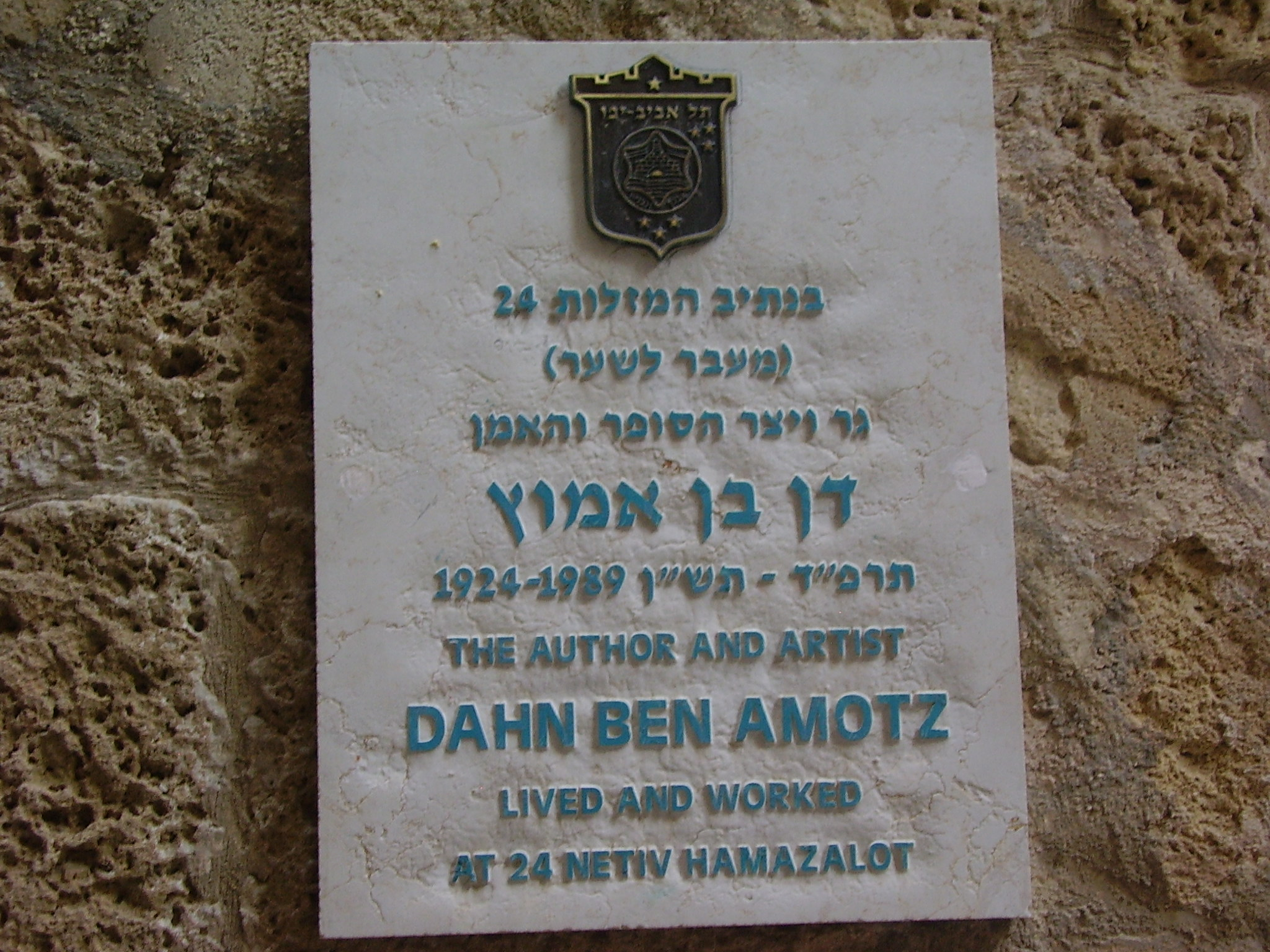
Memorial plaque on Dan Ben-Amotz house in Jaffa

In the 1980s he was diagnosed with liver cancer. When his disease became known to the public, he also brought to light the truth about his personal history. He made a much-publicized trip to Poland that included a tour of Auschwitz. On April 8, 1989, he held a farewell party at the "Hamam" club in Jaffa, to which he invited 150 acquaintances. The invitees included Amos Keinan (a former rival), Amos Oz, Meir Shalev, Gila Almagor, Yaakov Agmon, Shlomo Artzi, Yosef Lapid, Yehudit Ravitz and Nurit Galron. After the party he made a trip to the US, to say goodbye to his children from his first marriage. He died in 1989 in Jaffa and was survived by two sons and two daughters. His funeral was held on October 22.

On January 11, 1992, journalist Amnon Dankner published a biography of Ben-Amotz, in which he argued that Ben-Amotz had incest with his mother when he was thirteen. He also claimed that in his last years, Ben-Amotz had forced himself on underage girls he would pick up in Jaffa. These claims led to a police investigation of some of Ben-Amotz's friends. The book stirred a scandal. Some saw it as exploding the myth of Dan Ben-Amotz, while others saw it as an attempt to gain financially from exploiting Ben-Amotz's legacy by spreading groundless criticism against Ben-Amotz, and many of Ben-Amotz's relatives, who were also Dankner's friends, threatened to file a libel suit against Dankner and broke off contact with him.

== Published works ==
Parents Meeting (1962) was semi-autobiographical short story about the hardships of the new immigrants in an Israeli boarding school in the Yishuv. The screenplay for the movie Siege (1968), in which he also acted, dealt with the difficulties that a war widow faces in militaristic Israeli society. His novel To Remember, To Forget (1968) revealed some autobiographical motifs – the protagonist is a young man who lost his family in the Holocaust and attempted (by changing his name) to re-create himself as a true sabra. In the book, Ben-Amotz tried to confront such questions as his European past and German guilt over the Holocaust. In 1972 he published his dictionary of Hebrew slang, which he co-wrote with Netiva Ben Yehuda. The novel Does Not Give a Damn (1973) told of a soldier who was wounded in battle and his rehabilitation efforts.

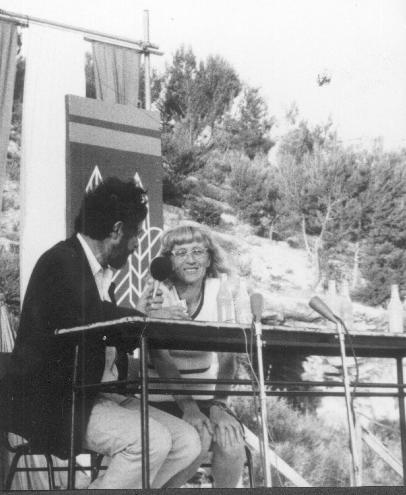
Photo of Netiva Ben-Yehuda with Dan Ben-Amotz from Palmach Archive

=== Novels ===
- Lizkor lishcoah. 1968; as To Remember, to Forget, 1968.
- Lo sam zayin [Does Not Give a Damn]. 1973.
- Ziyunim zeh lo ha-kol: Roman mafteah le-lo man'ul (Screwing Isn't Everything). 1979.
- Ziyunyune ha-derekh: Roman mafteah le-lo man'ul (sequel to Ziyunim zeh lo ha-kol). 1980.

=== Short stories ===
- Arba'ah ve-'arba'ah: Sipurim [Four and Four: Stories]. 1950.
- Sipurim poh sipurim sham. 1982.

=== Plays ===
- Tefos kamah she-atah yakhol (Seret-metah-meforash) [Catch As Much You Can] (screenplay). 1975; as Mishak yeladim [Nothing to It], 1982.
- Tel-Aviv ha-ketanah: Hizayon [Little Old Tel-Aviv], with Hayim Hefer. 1980.
- 'Al 'akhbarim va-anashim, with Ehud Manor, adaptation of Of Mice and Men by John Steinbeck (produced 1990).

=== Screenplays ===
- Matzor [Siege], with Gilberto Tofano, 1968
- Sheloshah yamim ve-yeled, with Uri Zohar and Amatsia Hiouni, adaptation of a story by A. B. Yehoshua, 1976.

=== Other ===
- Yalkut ha-kezavim, with Hayim Hefer. 1956.
- Mah nishma' [What's New]. 1959.
- Ekh la-'asot mah [How to Do What]. 1962.
- Milon olami le-'ivrit miduberet [The World Dictionary of Hebrew Slang] (2 vols.), with Netiva Ben-Yehuda. 1972, 1982.
- Yofi shel milhamah. 1974.
- Keri'ah tamah; Sifrutek [Reflection in Time]. 1974.
- Nashim kotvot le-Dan Ben-Amots: Bi-teguvah le-sefer "Ziyunim zeh lo ha-kol," with Varda Rasiel Jackont (correspondence). 1980.
- Sipurei Abu-Nimer [Stories and Fables from Arab Folklore]. 1982.
- Sefer ha-felots veha-shikhehah, with Donald Wetzel and Martin Riskin. 1985.
- Kelil tif'eret ha-melitsah (dictionary and reader of 19th century Hebrew). 1986.
- Ten hiyukh: Metav ha-kezavim she-lo hikhzivu ba-'itonut hatseva'it, with Ze'ev Anner and Dani Kerman. 1989.
- Editor, with Shlomo Shva, Erets Tsiyon Yerushalayim. 1973.
- Translator, with Amnon Dankner, Adif melafefon 'al hagever mi-pene she, (Why Cucumbers are Better Than Men by M. L. Brooks). 1985.

== See also ==
- Hebrew language
- Hebrew literature
- Culture of Israel
