= Editors Committee (Israel) =

Israeli informal journalistic forum

The Editors Committee is an informal forum comprising the editors and owners of the main Israeli media. It meets regularly with the prime minister, cabinet members and senior officials. Until the 1980s, it took a central role in the self-censorship practiced by the Israeli media. The understanding was that the information reported to the committee would not be published in the media, even once received from another source.

== Origins ==
The British authorities enacted in 1933 the Press Ordinance, which regulated the content of the news press in British Palestine. Many of the country's Jewish newspapers, particularly the English-language The Jerusalem Post and those printed in Hebrew, were founded by Zionist political parties during the pre-statehood period, and subsequently continued to be politically affiliated with such parties.

Professor Dan Caspi, who has served as chairman of the Israeli Communications Association, notes in his Mass Media and Politics (The Open University, 1997), "The majority of the newspapers in Israel's pre-state period were founded as ideological organs of political trends, and were under the ideological authority of the political parties and dependent on their financial backing. The party institutions and their leaders were involved in the selection process for the sensitive senior positions in the paper, particularly in the choice of the editor."

In the pre-state yishuv period, most Hebrew press editors felt that their primary role was educational, to help in the state-building process. Such values as freedom of the press and the idea of being a public watchdog were secondary. The editors of the Hebrew-language press founded the Reaction Committee in 1942 because, as they stated at the time, they "felt the need for guidance from the Jewish community's leadership on publication policy concerning sensitive matters, such as the expulsion of ma'apilim (illegal immigrants) and the search for weapons in Hebrew settlements".

== Early Statehood ==
In 1948, the Press Ordinance was adopted by Israel and administered by the Ministry of Interior which undertook to "license, supervise, and regulate" the press. After the establishment of the state in 1948, prime minister David Ben-Gurion saw great advantages in the arrangement with the Israeli press, and he frequently convened the newly renamed Editors Committee to share important information with the editors, on condition that it would not be published.

The IDF assumed responsibility for administering the censorship regulations. This was done through an agreement with the Editor's Committee, which allowed most Hebrew-language newspapers to exercise self-censorship, with the censor receiving only articles dealing with national security matters. This arrangement did not cover Arabic language publications, whose editors were required to submit items for publication to the military administration on a nightly basis.

== Decline in status ==
Co-operation between the government and the press was sometimes tense. These tensions increased as the value of free speech and the role of the press as watchdog came to be more widely recognized. The process accelerated in the 1970s, as a result of social changes in Israel and developments in the global media. The Yom Kippur War of 1973 served as a major change catalyst, by initiating a wide coverage of military issues and criticism of military failures. Towards the 1982 Lebanon War, partial information was published concerning the plans for an operation and the disagreement in the cabinet towards it. When fighting eventually started, the Israeli media initially followed the government's guidance in publishing information about the war. However, within about three weeks, when it became clear that the operation was not meeting its original goals, Israeli society engaged in a public debate about the war, which was covered widely by the press.

In parallel, the role of the Committee itself declined following the 1977 elections, that brought right-wing Likud party to power for the first time. New prime minister Menachem Begin was suspicious of most of the press, which he considered as being hostile to his party, and rarely convened the forum.

In 1992, five soldiers of Sayeret Matkal, an elite commando unit of the Israel Defense Forces, were killed in a training accident. Information about the accident, and in particular the presence at the site of Ehud Barak, then chief of IDF staff, was censored. However, after information was leaked to the foreign press and published abroad, the episode was reported in Israel, too. As a result of this affair, two major newspapers, Haaretz and Yediot Aharonot, withdrew from the censorship agreement and the Editors Committee.

== Current status ==
A new censorship agreement, signed in 1996, limited censorship to information that, when published, would, "with high probability", constitute a real danger to national security. In addition, it ensured the press's right to appeal the censor's decisions to the Supreme Court.

To receive an official press card, Israeli journalists must sign an agreement pledging not to publish any security information that could "help Israel's enemies" or "harm the state."

== Israeli censorship in the Occupied Territories ==
In 1988, Israeli authorities, suspecting Palestinian journalists of involvement in the Intifada, censored or shut down many Palestinian newspapers and magazines in the West Bank and the Gaza Strip and arrested several journalists.

== See also ==
- Internet Censorship in the Arab Spring

== Sources ==
- The IFLA/FAIFE World Report on Libraries and Intellectual Freedom, 2001 : Israel
- Palestine-Israel Journal: "The Rocky Road from Big Brother's Helper to Government Watchdog", by Hillel Schenker, 1998
