= Steve Linde =

Newspaper editor

- סטיב לינדה
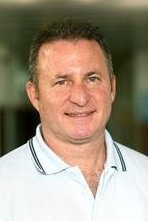
- Born: Steven Saxe Linde; April 23, 1960 (age 66); Harare, Zimbabwe
- Education: Rhodes University; University of Kwazulu-Natal; University of California, Berkeley
- Employer: Jewish News Syndicate

Steve Linde (Hebrew: סטיב לינדה; born April 23, 1960) is features editor at Jerusalem News Syndicate, a former editor-in-chief of The Jerusalem Post (2011-2016), and a former editor-in-chief of The Jerusalem Report (2017-2024).

== Early life ==
Linde was born in Harare, Zimbabwe, to Jewish parents, Roseve (Saacks) and Hilyer Samuel Linde, and grew up in Durban, South Africa. At 15, he attended a four-month "ulpan" study program at Jerusalem’s Kiryat Moriah with 50 other Jewish South African students, under the supervision of Hebrew teacher Dr. Issy Fisher and his wife, Judy, which he said "cemented my love of Israel forever." He matriculated in 1977 from Carmel College, where he was head boy and earned an honors blazer, with colors in academics, athletics, rugby and debating. After completing a one-year program at the Hebrew University of Jerusalem's Rothberg International School, he received a bachelor's degree in Journalism and Media Studies from Rhodes University, followed by graduate degrees in sociology from the University of KwaZulu-Natal and journalism from the University of California at Berkeley. He wrote his sociology thesis on the emergence of Mohandas Gandhi as a charismatic leader in South Africa (under the supervision of Fatima Meer), and his journalism thesis on the homeless in Berkeley (under the supervision of Ben Bagdikian and Bernard Taper).

== Career ==
Linde immigrated to Israel in 1988 and served in the IDF Artillery Corps. He was a popular radio broadcaster for 21 years (1990-2011), working as an editor, reporter, newsreader and for five years as director of English News at Kol Yisrael (Israel Radio). He started working at The Jerusalem Post in 1997, doing stints as night editor, news editor, managing editor and editor-in-chief. Under his five-year editorship, the newspaper boosted its international stature, launching annual conferences in New York for its American readership and in Israel for the diplomatic corps. At the Jerusalem Post Diplomatic Conference in 2013, which Linde called the highlight of his career, he interviewed Israel's ninth president, Shimon Peres, on stage at the Daniel Herzliya Hotel. At the Fifth Annual Jerusalem Post Conference at the New York Marriott Marquis on May 22, 2016, when he handed over to his successor, Yaakov Katz, Linde interviewed American actor and Genesis Prize laureate Michael Douglas and media personality Dr. Ruth Westheimer. He has been a judge for the Israeli schools' Sia'h VaSig Harry Hurwitz Public Speaking League, Alon High School's Isaac Ochberg Creative Writing Project and the Sylvan Adams Bonei Zion Prize. He served as a member of Telfed’s Executive Council and chairman of the Telfed Media Committee. After stepping down as editor-in-chief of The Jerusalem Report, a position he held for seven years, in January 2025, he became a freelancer for CBS Radio News and features editor at JNS in February 2025.
