= Jewish state (disambiguation) =

The Jewish state is a characterization of the modern-day state of Israel.

Jewish state can also refer to:

- List of Jewish states and dynasties
- The Jewish State, or Der Judenstaat, a book by Theodor Herzl
- Jewish State (ship), or USCGC Northland (WPG-49), ship of the United States Coast Guard
