= Rothberg International School =

School for international students at the Hebrew University of Jerusalem

Coordinates: 31°47′34.3″N 35°14′46.0″E

The Rothberg International School (Hebrew: ע"ש רוטברג בית הספר לתלמידים מחוץ לארץ, romanized: Beit ha-Sefer le-Talmidim mi-Chutz la-Aretz al shem Rothberg; abbreviated RIS), is a school for international students at the Hebrew University of Jerusalem. It offers programs for undergraduate students, graduate students, summer courses, researchers and new immigrants. The school is housed in the Boyar Building on the university’s Mt. Scopus campus. It hosts approximately 2,500 students from 90 countries on an annual basis.

== History ==
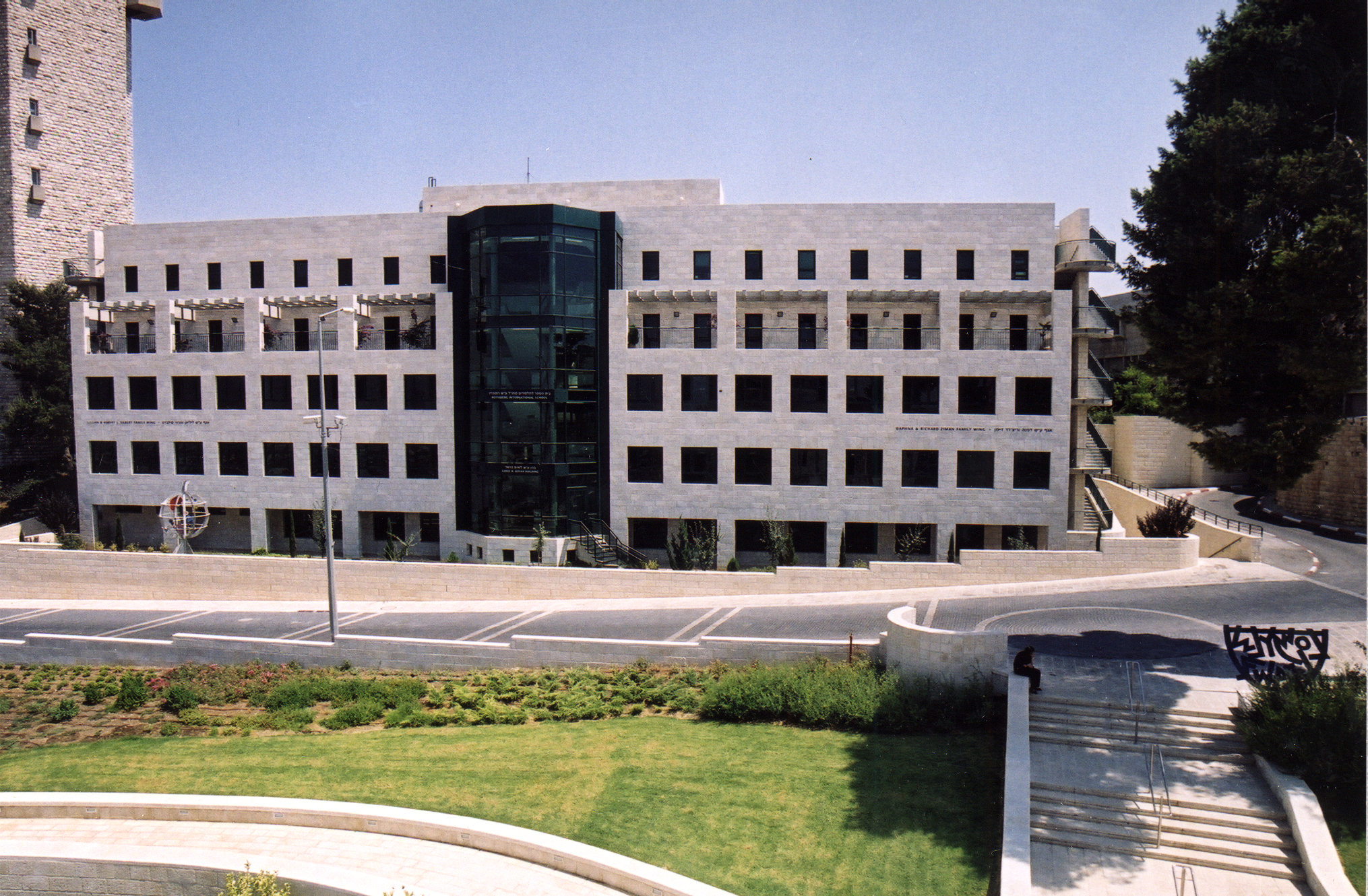
The Rothberg International School (Boyar Building)

The Rothberg International School began at the initiative of Samuel Rothberg, an influential American businessman and Zionist who was heavily involved in the development of The Hebrew University. It started in 1955 with twenty-one students from the United States.

The program continued during the 1960s and expanded to include summer courses and an intensive summer Hebrew language program. The Preparatory Program for New Immigrants (Mechina le-Olim) was established in 1965. The events of the Six Day War in June 1967 led to an increase in the number of overseas students at the Hebrew University, particularly from American students who wanted a study abroad experience. Several international programs at the university such as the One Year Program, the Preparatory Year Program, the Hebrew Ulpan (language course) and Summer Courses were consolidated into the School for Overseas Students in 1971. The school became the first academic unit to relocate from its Givat Ram campus to the Mount Scopus campus.

In 1981, the school was renamed The Rothberg School for Overseas Students

== Academic programs ==
The Rothberg International School has undergraduate, graduate, non-degree and short-term programs, in addition to the Mechina (Preparatory) program.

=== Undergraduate studies ===
The school offers a division of undergraduate studies for those pursuing a bachelor's degree outside Israel. There are also programs in dance, art and design, Arabic, music, and internships in technology and innovation. There is also a program developed with Harvard University.

=== Graduate studies ===
The division of graduate studies currently offers five graduate degree options in Jewish studies, The Bible and the Ancient Near East, Israel studies, Middle Eastern studies, non-profit management and leadership. Graduate students may join a non-degree program and choose from any of the courses offered in the graduate division.

=== Mechina (preparatory program) ===
The preparatory (Mechina) program is for students from overseas not yet able to enroll in an undergraduate degree program in Israel. Mechina students are either in the process of becoming Israeli citizens or have recently immigrated to Israel. It is the largest academic preparatory program in Israel.

Historically, the student body of the Mechina program has reflected the immigration trends in Israel. When Operation Moses (1984) and Operation Solomon (1991) brought Ethiopian Jewish immigrants to Israel, the Mechina had an increase in Ethiopian students. In 1991, with the 1990s post-Soviet aliyah, four times the number of students from the Former Soviet Union enrolled than the previous year.

== List of provosts and vice-provosts ==
=== Provosts ===
Name	Start	End
Prof. Yehoshua Arieli	1971	1973
Prof. Hillel Matthew Daleski	1973	1976
Prof. Mordechai Abir	1976	1979
Prof. Zev Klein	1979	1982
Prof. Haim Beinart (interim)	1982	1983
Prof. Zev Klein	1983	1985
Prof. Amnon Shiloah	1985	1989
Prof. Immanuel Etkes	1989	1993
Prof. Michel Abitbol	1993	1999
Prof. Menahem Milson	1999	2002
Prof. Steven Kaplan	2002	2004
Prof. Jaime Kapitulnik	2004	2007
Prof. Yonata Levy	2007	2010
Prof. Mimi Ajzenstadt	2010	2015
Prof. Malka Rappaport Hovav	2015	2017
Prof. Noam Shoval	2017	

=== Vice-provosts ===
Name	Start	End			
Dr. Avraham Avi-hai	1971	1973	Mr. Israel Ro’i	1973	2001
Ms. Liba Maimon	2001	2002			
Mr. Shimon Lipsky	2002	2014			
Dr. Jonathan Kaplan	2014	2019			
Ms. Yafit Sherer	2019				

== Notable alumni ==
- Wolf Blitzer – American journalist, television news anchor and author
- Nathan Englander – American novelist
- Tom Friedman – American journalist
- Alexander Gould – American actor and voice artist
- Ambassador Martin Indyk – US Ambassador to Israel
- Eugene Kandel - Israeli economist
- Ambassador Daniel Kurtzer – US Ambassador to Israel
- Steve Linde (born 1960) - newspaperman
- Dr. Deborah Lipstadt – American professor of modern Jewish history
- Natalie Portman – American-Israeli actress and filmmaker
- Ambassador Daniel Shapiro – US Ambassador to Israel
- Bari Weiss – American journalist
- Efraim Zuroff – Israeli historian and Nazi hunter
