= Tom Segev =

Israeli historian, author and journalist (born 1945)

- תום שגב
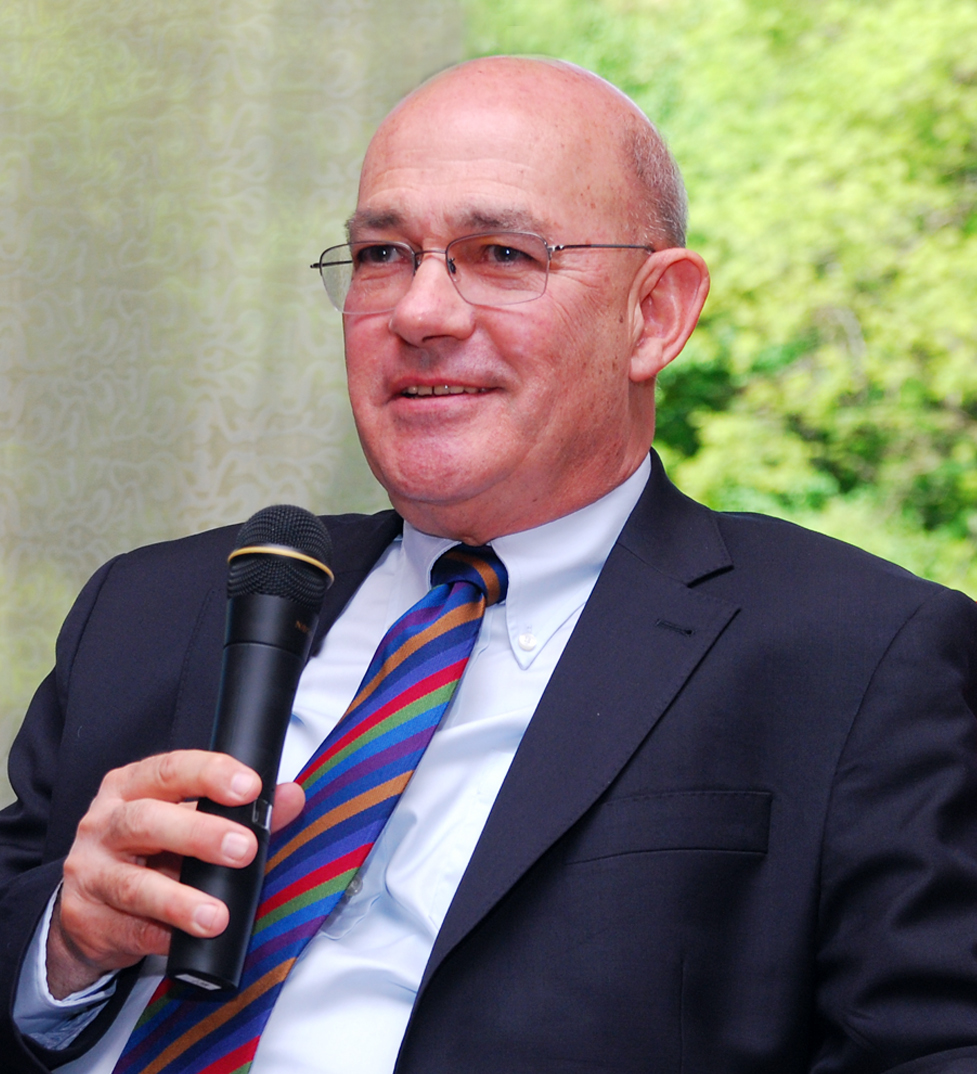
- Tom Segev in 2011
- Born: March 1, 1945 (age 81); Jerusalem, Mandatory Palestine
- Education: Hebrew University of Jerusalem (BA); Boston University (PhD)
- Occupations: Historian; author; journalist
- Years active: 1970s–present

Tom Segev (Hebrew: תום שגב; born March 1, 1945) is an Israeli historian, author and journalist. He is associated with Israel's New Historians, a group critical of many of the country's traditional narratives.

== Early life and education ==
Segev was born on March 1, 1945 in Jerusalem. His parents, Ricarda (née Meltzer) and Heinz Schwerin, both Jewish, were artists who had met at the Bauhaus art school in Berlin, and had fled Nazi Germany in 1935 due to their Communist affiliation. His mother was a photographer; his father, an architect and toy manufacturer, died on February 3, 1948, after falling from a building during the 1948 Arab–Israeli War. His mother never learned Hebrew beyond a basic level, thus his first language was German.

Segev earned a BA in history and political science from the Hebrew University of Jerusalem, followed by a PhD in history from Boston University in Massachusetts in the 1970s. Segev did his mandatory service in the Israel Defense Forces as a librarian at the National Security College in Jerusalem. Around that time, he hebraized his name from Thomas Schwerin to Tom Segev. According to Segev, a representative for the Mossad offered him the opportunity to study Chinese at Harvard University and join the intelligence agency.

== Career ==
In 1977, Segev was the bureau chief of Jerusalem Mayor Teddy Kollek. Segev worked during the 1970s as a correspondent for Maariv in Bonn. He was a visiting professor at Rutgers University (2001–2002), the University of California, Berkeley (2007) and Northeastern University, where he taught a course on Holocaust denial. He writes a weekly column for the newspaper Haaretz. His books have appeared in fourteen languages.

== Books ==
In The Seventh Million: The Israelis and the Holocaust (1993), Segev explores the decisive impact of the Holocaust on the identity, ideology and politics of Israel. Although controversial, it was praised by Elie Wiesel in the Los Angeles Times Book Review.

In One Palestine, Complete: Jews and Arabs Under the British Mandate, a New York Times Editor's Choice Best Book (2000) and a recipient of a National Jewish Book Award in the Israel category, Segev gives an account of the era of the British Mandate in Palestine (1917–1948).

Segev's history of the social and political background of the Six-Day War, 1967: Israel, the War, and the Year That Transformed the Middle East (2007) states that there was no existential threat to Israel from a military point of view. Segev also doubts that the Arab neighbours would have really attacked Israel. Still, large segments of the Israeli population had a real fear that the Egyptians and Syrians would eliminate them. That fear pressured the Israeli government in such a way that it opted for a pre-emptive attack. The Jordanian army's attack on West Jerusalem provided a pretext to invade East Jerusalem, according to Segev. Even though the occupation of East Jerusalem was not politically planned, the author considers that it was always desired. Michael Oren, Israel's ambassador to the United States from 2009 to 2013 and author of Six Days of War, criticized the book for not properly considering the domestic politics of Arab countries or the military support they had received from the Soviet Union.

In February 2018, Segev published a biography of David Ben-Gurion, which appeared in English the following year as A State at Any Cost: The Life of David Ben-Gurion. The book, based on documents from the Israel State Archives, generated controversy in Israel. Among other revelations were Ben-Gurion's fear that the Jewish army would not be able to triumph in the 1948 Palestine War and his unsuccessful attempt to get the British Mandate for Palestine extended. According to Segev, the book took six years to write. Journalists Linda Gradstein and Avraham Avi-hai described the book as a fact-based personal portrait of Ben-Gurion.

== New Historians ==
Segev is one of Israel's New Historians, a group critical of many of the country's traditional narratives, and is considered one of Israel's most prolific and controversial historians. Journalists Linda Gradstein and Avraham Avi-hai described Segev as a "meticulous historian who sticks to the facts", in comparison with other New Historians "who seem to target their critique and then create arguments to justify them." Journalist Ofir Aderet described him as "one of Israel's most highly esteemed historians overseas."

== Personal life ==
Segev has an adopted son from Ethiopia and four grandchildren. His sister Jutta Oesterle-Schwerin later became a member of German Bundestag for Alliance '90/The Greens. Segev rejects the post-Zionist label, but does not believe that Zionism was a success story, as it does not provide security to Jews.

== Published works ==
Note: Date of Hebrew publication followed by date of English translation. U.S. publisher followed by UK publisher if different.

- 1984 / 1986 – 1949: The First Israelis (The Free Press / Collier Macmillan)
- 1987 / 1988 – Soldiers of Evil: The Commandants of the Nazi Concentration Camps (McGraw-Hill)
- 1991 / 1993 – The Seventh Million: Israelis and the Holocaust (Hill and Wang)
- 1999 / 2000 – One Palestine, Complete: Jews and Arabs Under the British Mandate (Metropolitan Books / Little, Brown)
- 2001 / 2002 – Elvis in Jerusalem: Post-Zionism and the Americanization of Israel (Metropolitan Books)
- 2005 / 2007 – 1967: Israel, the War, and the Year That Transformed the Middle East (Metropolitan Books)
- 2010 / 2010 – Simon Wiesenthal: The Life and Legends (Doubleday / Jonathan Cape), translated from the Hebrew manuscript
- 2018 / 2019 – A State at Any Cost: The Life of David Ben-Gurion (Farrar, Straus and Giroux / Head of Zeus)
