= Kingdom of Simien =

Kingdom of Beta Israel in the Ethiopian Empire

Kingdom of Simien ממלכת סאמיאן
- Map of Jewish settlements in Ethiopia
- Status: According to legends: Sovereign Jewish kingdom (350–351) Axumite Territory (351–960) Reestablished (960–1329) Vassal State of the Ethiopian Empire 1329–1625
- Location: Semien Mountains and Semien Province
- Capital: Amba Yehouda
- Common languages: Geʽez, Kayla, Qwara, Amharic
- Demonyms: Ethiopian; Beta Israel
- History
  - Established: 350
  - Disestablished: 351 (re-established in 960 until invaded again in 1329 by Ethiopia and annexed in 1625)
Preceded by	Succeeded by
Kingdom of Aksum	Ethiopian Empire
- Today part of: Ethiopia

The Kingdom of Simien (Hebrew: ממלכת סאמיאן), also known as the Kingdom of Beta Israel (ממלכת ביתא ישראל), (Note: Also referred to as "Land of the Gideons" by Rabbi Abraham ben Eliezer Halevi in the 14th century named after the dynasty's first ruler.) was a semi-legendary Jewish kingdom said to have been located in the northwestern part of the Ethiopian Empire. The existence of such a kingdom somewhere in the Horn of Africa was first mentioned by the traveller Benjamin of Tudela in the 12th century CE.

A late Ethiopian-Jewish legend dates the establishment of a Kingdom of Simien to the 4th century CE, right after the Kingdom of Aksum turned to Christianity during the reign of Ezana. Local history holds that, around 960, a Jewish Queen named Gudit defeated the empire and burned its churches and literature. While there is evidence of churches being burned and an invasion around this time, her existence has been questioned by some western authors, and it is unclear whether Aksum continued to exist. According to tradition, she reigned for forty years and her dynasty lasted until 1137 AD, when it was either overthrown or conquered by Mara Takla Haymanot, resulting in the inception of the Agaw-led Zagwe dynasty. In 1329, during Amda Seyon I's conquests, he campaigned in the northern provinces of Semien, Wegera, Tselemt, and Tsegede, in which many had been converting to Judaism and where the Beta Israel had been gaining prominence.

The existence of such a nation plays a significant role in the modern traditions of the Beta Israel.

== Name ==
According to modern Beta Israel tradition, their forefathers' land was called the "Kingdom of the Gideons", after the name of a putative dynasty of Jewish kings that are said to have ruled it. Eldad ha-Dani mentioned that the Tribe of Dan exiled voluntarily and established an independent kingdom. Between the 15th century and the early 17th century the Ethiopian Empire referred to the kingdom as "Falasha". Another name which was very common in the 16th and 17th centuries was the "Kingdom of Semien" – given to the kingdom after the area which it dominated after it lost control over the regions of Dembiya and Wegera.

== History ==
An Israelite self-identity and Old Testament practices and culture have permeated Ethiopian civilization, and its Jewish and Christian populations, since very early times. (Note: 'No church anywhere in the world has remained as faithful to the letter and spirit of the Old Testament as the Ethiopian Orthodox Church. Numerous biblical customs have survived in the practice of Ethiopian Christians. For example, male children are circumcised on the eighth day after birth. The Saturday Sabbath long held sway in Ethiopia and figured prominently in the rituals, liturgy, theological literature and even politics of the Church. Traditional Ethiopian dietary laws conform closely to those of the Old Testament, and the three-fold division of churches in Ethiopia clearly replicates the architectural structure of the Temple in Jerusalem.')

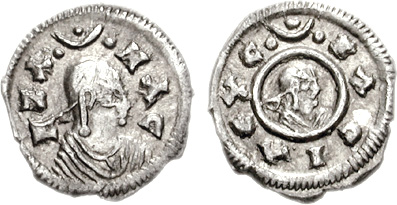
Coins with the image of Emperor Ezana of Axum

The beginning of a conversion process of the Kingdom of Axum to Christianity is thought to have occurred with the arrival of two Syrian brothers Frumentius and Aedesius, sometime in the reign of Ezana. The conversion, bringing with it Hebraizing elements, was partial, initially was limited to the court and probably affected only the caravan trading route areas between Axum and Adulis. Neither Judaizing nor Christianizing local populations would have fitted into what we later define as normative Judaism or Christianity, but were syncretic mixtures of local faiths and new beliefs from forebears of these respective religions. Later legend speaks of a revolt by Jews taking place at this period but there is no evidence that directly support this story, and its historicity is considered unlikely. A strong possibility exists that the Christian Kaleb of Axum, who had dispatched military contingents to fight against the Judaizing Dhu Nuwas of the Arabian peninsula kingdom of Himyar banished opponents to the Simien Mountains, which later emerged as a Beta Israel stronghold. Nothing in the historical record from the 6th to the 13th centuries, however, has allowed scholars to make anything more than very tentative hypotheses concerning the Jewish communities of that time. Legends surrounding a Jewish queen called Judith (Gudit) have been dismissed by Ethiopian specialists like Edward Ullendorff as without foundation in any historical facts.

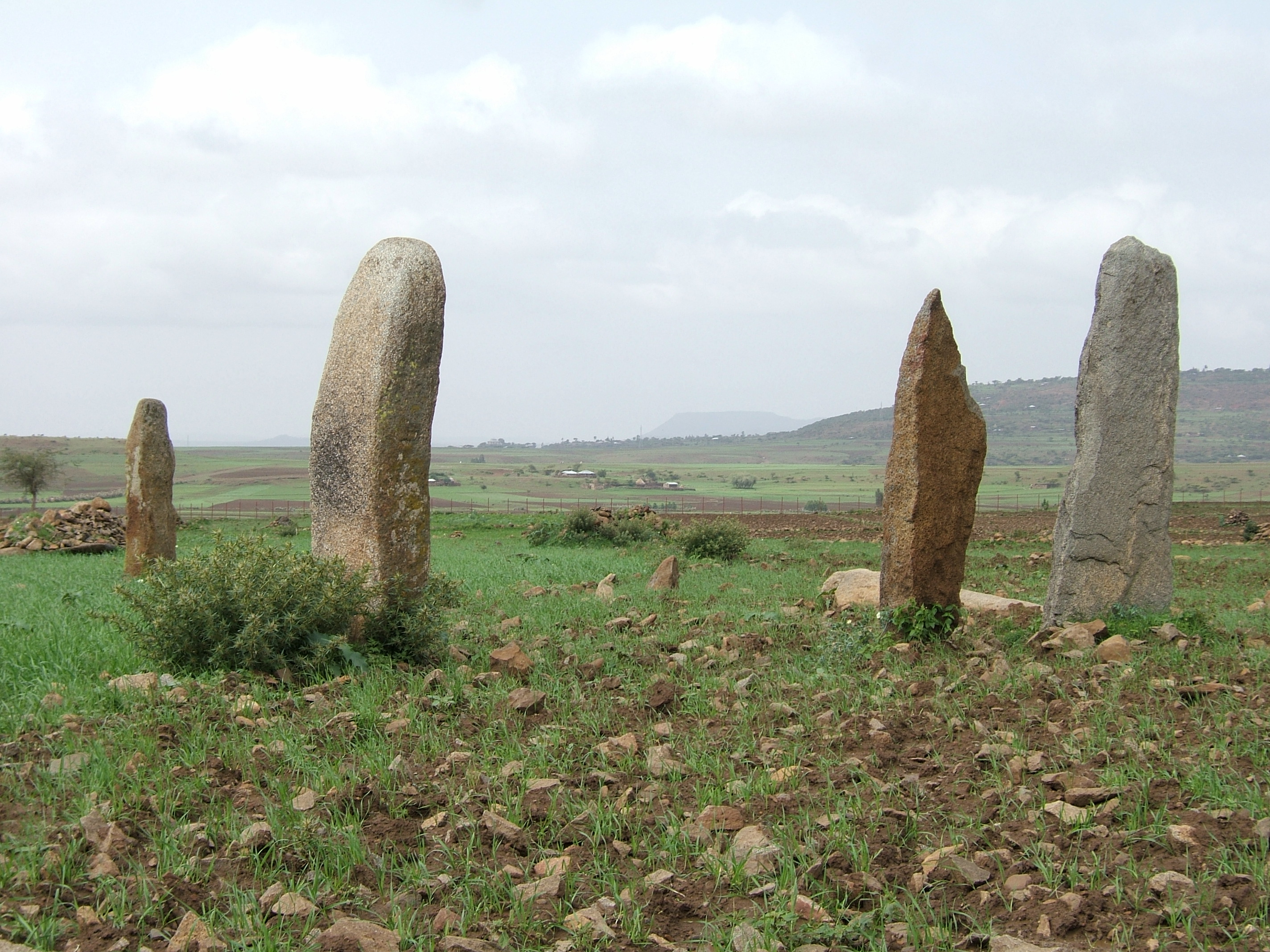
The steles of "Judith's Field" near Aksum, traditionally dated to the time of Gudit, are thought to mark the graves of lower ranked officials.

The Golden Age of this putative Beta Israel kingdom would have taken place, according to the Ethiopian tradition, between the years 858–1270. The stories of Eldad ha-Dani spread the notion of just such an entity, though scholarly confidence in the veracity of many elements in his book is deeply divided: the majority of scholars dismiss its pretensions to conserve authentic history, but a small number consider that his narrative is the earlier to refer to the people much later known as Falasha. According to Steve Kaplan, neither Eldad nor Benjamin of Tudela -who hypothesized the existence of a Jewish polity there, - seem to have had any direct first-hand knowledge of Ethiopia. By the 16th century, David ben Solomon ibn Abi Zimra accepted the Jewishness of the Beta Israel but knew they were wholly unfamiliar with the Talmud. The Zagwe historically fell victim to Jewish raids as it was possibly a militarily weak state.

In 1270 the Christian Solomonic dynasty was established and set out to consolidate its hegemony by subjugating the independent highlands. The drive towards religious and political unification took on momentum after Amda Seyon (1314–1344) came to power, and thereafter a succession of leaders campaigned in the north-west provinces of Simien, Wegera, Tselemt and Tsegede where the Judaized population were concentrated. There is no evidence for a unified Beta Israel dominion at this time other than oral tradition. Judaized groups were dispersed, politically divided,- some being allied to the Emperor - and were referred to as "like Jews" (Ge'ez ከመ:አይሁድ kama ayhūd), or the "sons of Jews".

Emperor Yeshaq (1414–1429), who had allies among the Beta Israel, conquered Simien and Dambiya, whose governors were Jewish. Fiefs (gult) were distributed to secure loyalty and reward supporters, and Yesheq assigned such gult land to his allies. These owners (bala-gult) could tax the peasants, who nonetheless in the Ethiopian tenure system still remained the hereditary proprietors. He introduced one innovation, however, regarding this hereditary property (rist). It could be retained by those willing to convert to Christianity and as a consequence, a portion of the Judaized community (ayhud) lost their land. Yeshaq decreed, "He who is baptized in the Christian religion may inherit the land of his father, otherwise let him be a Falāsī." This may have been the origin for the term "Falasha" (falāšā, "wanderer," or "landless person").

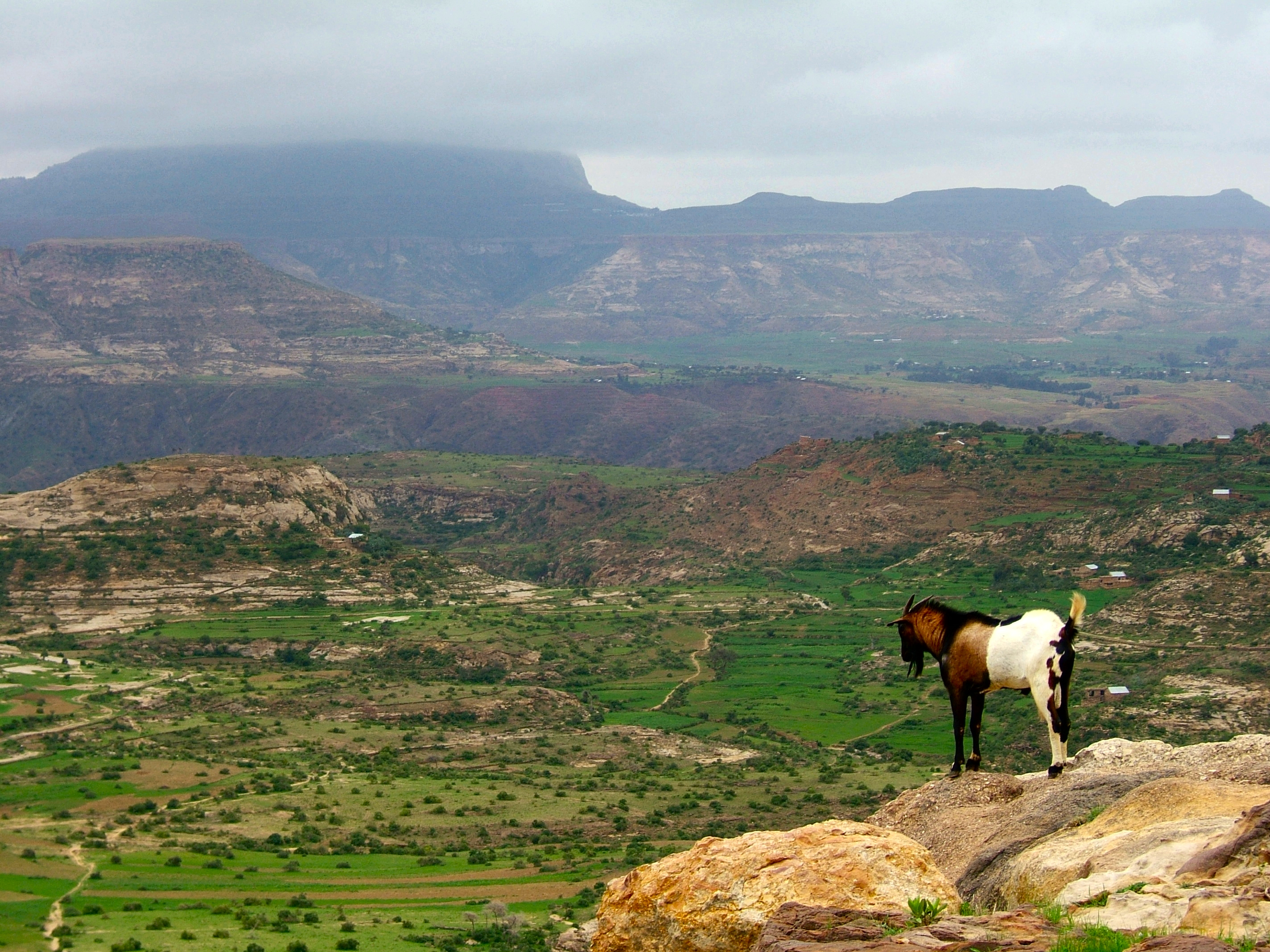
The Ras Dashen area which used to be part of the kingdom

== See also ==
- Beta Israel
- Falash Mura
- List of Jewish states and dynasties
- Gudit

== Sources ==
- Andersen, Knud Tage (2000). "The Queen of the Habasha in Ethiopian History, Tradition and Chronology". Bulletin of the School of Oriental and African Studies, University of London. 63 (1). Bulletin of the School of Oriental and African Studies: 31–63. doi:10.1017/S0041977X00006443. JSTOR 1559587.
- Bruce, James (1804). Travels to Discover the Source of the Nile (2 ed.). James Ballantyne.
- Fauvelle-Aymar, François-Xavier (April 2013). "Desperately Seeking the Jewish Kingdom of Ethiopia: Benjamin of Tudela and the Horn of Africa (Twelfth Century)". Speculum. 88 (2): 383–404. doi:10.1017/S0038713413000857. JSTOR 23488846. S2CID 163444188.
- Kaplan, Steve (1988). "The Invention of Ethiopian Jews: Three Models". Cahiers d'Études Africaines. 33 (132): 645–658. doi:10.3406/cea.1993.1497. ISSN 0008-0055. JSTOR 4392496.
- Kaplan, Steve (1992). The Beta Israel: Falasha in Ethiopia: From Earliest Times to the Twentieth Century. New York University Press. ISBN 978-0-814-74848-0.
- Kaplan, Steve (2003). "Betä Əsraʾel". In Uhlig, Siegbert; Bausi, Alessandro; Crummey, Donald; Goldenberg, Gideon; Yemām, Bāya (eds.). Encyclopaedia Aethiopica. Vol. 1. Harrassowitz Verlag. p. 553.
- Kaplan, Steve (2007). "Beta Israel". Encyclopedia Judaica. Vol. 3 (2 ed.). Thomson Gale. pp. 499–508.
- Pankhurst, Richard (1997). The Ethiopian Borderlands: Essays in Regional History from Ancient Times to the End of the 18th Century. The Red Sea Press. ISBN 978-0-932-41519-6.
- Quirin, James Arthur (1992). The Evolution of the Ethiopian Jews: A History of the Beta Israel (Falasha) to 1920. University of Pennsylvania Press. ISBN 978-0-812-23116-8.
- Seeman, Don (Summer 1991). "Ethnographers, Rabbis and Jewish Epistemology: The Case of the Ethiopian Jews". Tradition: A Journal of Orthodox Jewish Thought. 25 (4): 13–29. JSTOR 23260928.
