= List of Jewish states and dynasties =

This is a list of dynasties and states that have historically had ties to either ethnic Jews or their religion of Judaism.

== States by region ==
=== Southern Levant ===
- Twelve Tribes of Israel, c. 1350-1047 BCE
- Kingdom of Israel (united monarchy), c. 1047–930 BCE
- Kingdom of Israel (Samaria), c. 930–720 BCE
- Kingdom of Judah, c. 930–587/586 BCE
- Yehud Medinata, c. 539–332 BCE
- Hasmonean kingdom, c. 140–37 BCE
- Herodian kingdom/tetrarchy, 37 BCE – 100 CE
- Judean provisional government, 66–68 CE
- Bar Kokhba Jewish state, 132–135 CE
- State of Israel, 1948 CE–present

=== Wider Middle East ===
- Himyarite Kingdom, Yemen, 390 CE – 525 CE
- Nehardea, Mesopotamia, 18–33 CE (ruled by Anilai and Asinai of the Parthian Empire)
- Adiabene, Mesopotamia, c. 30–115 CE
- Mahoza Kingdom, Mesopotamia, 495–502 CE (established by Mar-Zutra II)
- Banu Nadir, Banu Qurayza and other Jewish tribes of the Khaybar, Saudi Arabia, unknown-628 CE.

=== Africa ===
- Kingdom of Simien, Ethiopia c. 960-1137 CE, legendary but Gudit was thought to have reigned 960–1000 CE following the collapse of the Kingdom of Aksum before the rise of the Zagwe dynasty in 1137 CE

=== Caucasia ===
- Khazar Khaganate, c. 750–950 CE (semi-nomadic Turkic state in the Caucasus whose ruling royal elite seems to have converted to Judaism, although the extent to which it was adopted by commoners is highly debated)
- Aba-Sava, Dagestan 1630–1800, a semi-independent Mountain Jewish polity and relatively autonomous Persian vassal located south of Derbent

=== Siberia ===
- Jewish Autonomous Oblast, Russia c. 1934 CE–present, one of the federal subjects of Russia.

=== Proposed ===
- Medieval French Jewish vassal state, 768–900 CE (purportedly established during the Reconquista)
- Brutakhi, early-13th-century Turkic polity whose Jewishness is debatable; possibly either a Khazar remnant state or Jewish splinter state from the Cuman-Kipchak Confederation

== See also ==
- Jewish autonomism
- Jewish state, about the formation of Israel, and it's evolving definition
- List of Hasidic Jewish dynasties
- Proposals for a Jewish state
