= Avi Mayer =

- אבי מאיר
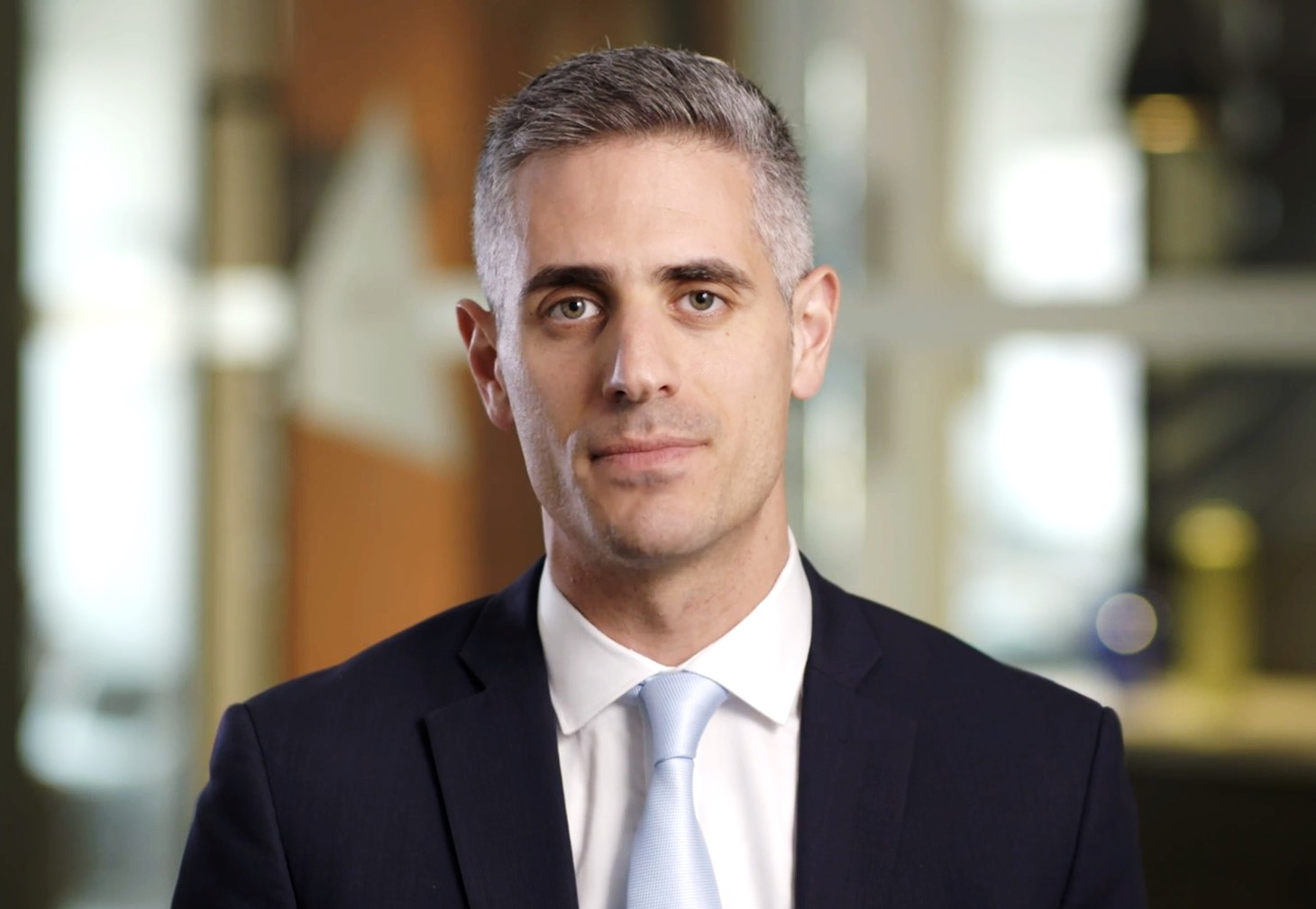

Avi Mayer (Hebrew: אבי מאיר) is an American activist and spokesperson who served as editor-in-chief of The Jerusalem Post in 2023.

== Early life and education ==
Mayer was born in New York City and raised in Jerusalem.

== Career ==
Mayer previously served as spokesperson for the Jewish Agency for Israel. He also served in the spokesperson's unit of the Israel Defense Forces.

In March 2023, Mayer was named editor-in-chief of The Jerusalem Post, succeeding Yaakov Katz. He left his position in December 2023, and was replaced by Zvika Klein.

In 2025, Mayer launched Jerusalem Journal, a Substack focused on Israel.
