= Amotz Asa-El =

Israeli journalist

Amotz Asa-El (Hebrew: אמוץ עשהאל) is an Israeli author and journalist.

He is the senior commentator and former executive editor of The Jerusalem Post, and a fellow at the Hartman Institute.

His latest English book is THE JEWISH MARCH OF FOLLY: The Dramatic Events, Fateful Results, and Unlearned Lessons of Ancient Israel's Political Suicide.

== Career ==
Prior to joining the Post, Asa-El was a foreign correspondent for the San Francisco Chronicle and foreign editor of the Hebrew-language financial daily Telegraph.

Having joined The Jerusalem Post as its business editor in 1995, Asa-El was later The Post's News Editor and editor-in-chief of its overseas edition, the International Jerusalem Post, before serving as The Jerusalem Post's executive editor. In these positions, Asa-El led The Post's editorial line that blended economic conservatism, diplomatic pragmatism, political reform and cultural pluralism. As executive editor, overseeing the work of 100 writers, editors, copyeditors, designers and photographers, Asa-El directed the redesign of the daily Jerusalem Post, the remodeling of its weekend magazines and supplements, and the creation of an opinion desk, after having previously created a business desk and reinvented The International Jerusalem Post as an independent news weekly.

Asa-El is the only senior editor in The Jerusalem Post's history who has never held a non-Israeli passport.

From 2006 to 2008 Asa-El led the launch of McGraw/Hill's Hebrew edition of BusinessWeek, and in 2010 he founded the Shalom Hartman Institute's Hebrew-language journal of thought Dorsheni.

An editor of the Jerusalem Report, a Middle East English-language newsmagazine, Asa-El has been for the past 20 years a commentator on Middle Eastern affairs for outlets like Reuters, BBC, CNN, SKY, Voice of America, France24 and Israeli TV.

Asa-El's weekly column "Middle Israel" has appeared in The Jerusalem Post since 1995, and aims to present in English the Israeli centrist's view on subjects including politics, foreign affairs, business, culture, and religion. Asa-El has been quoted or published by The New York Times, The Washington Post, The Wall Street Journal, The Los Angeles Times, BBC.com, Politico, USA Today, Haaretz, The Economist, Time magazine, The New Republic, Le Figaro, The Daily Telegraph, L'Express, Azure, Harvard Political Review, The Australian, The Australian Financial Review, Jornal do Brasil, The Times of India, Politiken, and others.

Asa-El's five-part series in The Jerusalem Report about the future of the Jewish people won the B'nai B'rith Journalism Award for 2018.

Since 2008 Asa-El has been a columnist for Dow Jones' MarketWatch, analyzing the Arab, Turkish, Iranian and Israeli economies as well as global issues like Western demographics, Swiss monetary policy, British unity, and the war in Ukraine.

Asa-El has been invited on lecture tours to the US, Canada, China, Brazil, Australia and New Zealand where he addressed business leaders, diplomats, legislators, journalists, clergy and academic forums on issues relating to Middle Eastern, international and Jewish affairs. His lectures were hosted among others by the American Israel Public Affairs Committee, Jewish National Fund, Anti-Defamation League, the American Jewish Committee, the Canada Israel Committee, the Australia Israel Jewish Affairs Council, United Israel Appeal, Hadassah and B'nai B'rith, as well as a variety of universities from Harvard and Columbia to the University of Melbourne and the Royal Military College of Canada.

== Books ==
Asa-El' books include:

- The Jewish March of Folly: How the Jews' Ancestors Forfeited Their Nation's Future," (Yedioth Books, 2019) a revisionist interpretation of the Jewish people's political history from antiquity to the dawn of Zionism, in Hebrew. The book was an Israeli bestseller.
- The Last Jewish Frontier (Yedioth Books, 2025), a meditation on the role of the frontier in Jewish history, and a sequel to Theodor Herzl's utopia The Old New Land.
- The Jewish March of Folly: The Dramatic Events, Fateful Results, and Unlearned Lessons of ancient Israel's Political Suicide (Yedioth Books, 2026), in English.
- The Diaspora and the Lost Tribes of Israel (Universe, 2004), a geographic history of the Jewish people,

== Education ==
Asa-El holds graduate degrees in journalism from Columbia University in New York, in Jewish history from the Hebrew University in Jerusalem, and in Near Eastern and Judaic Studies from Brandeis University.
