= Avraham Avi-hai =

Israeli civil servant and writer (1931–2023)

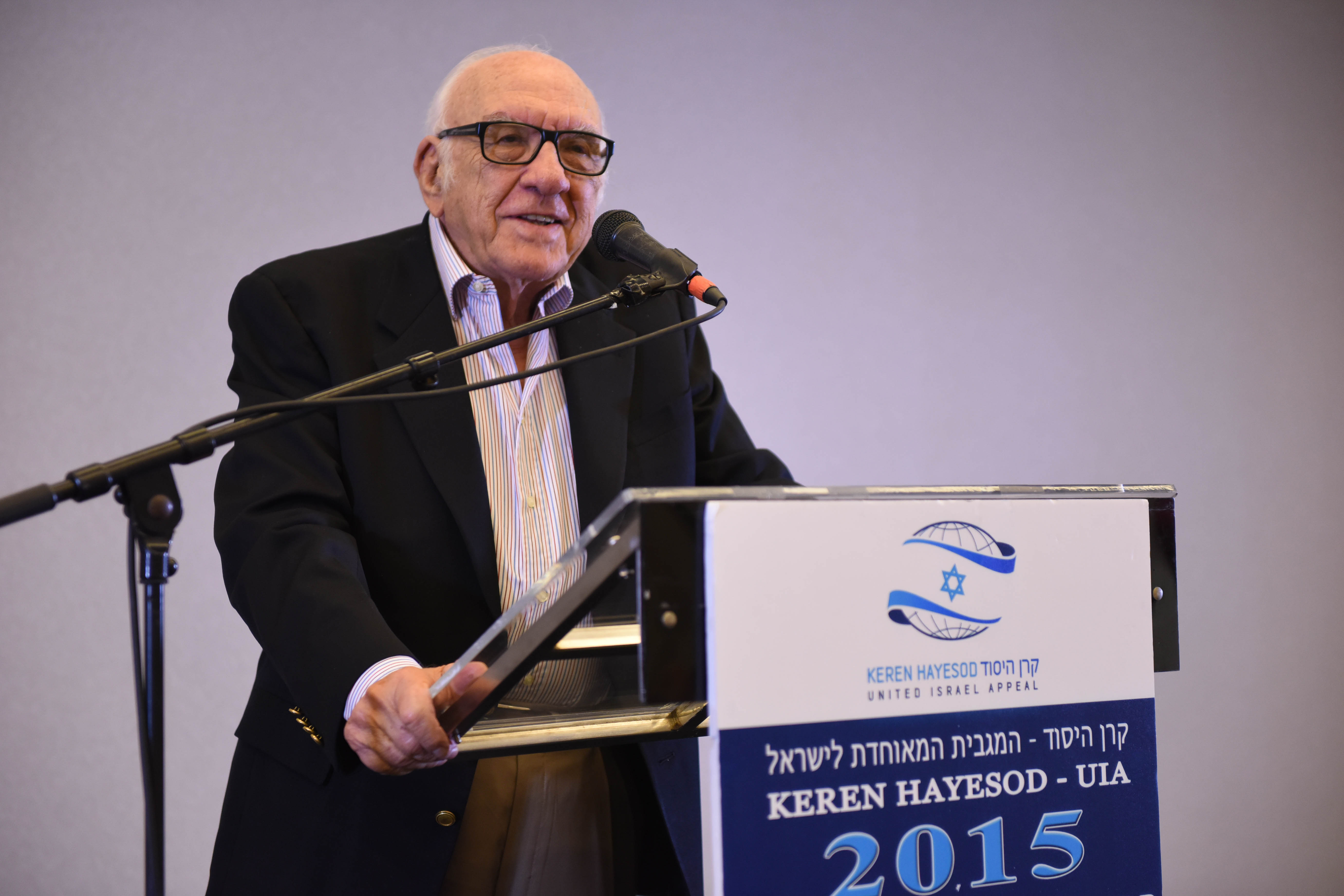
Avi-hai speaks at a Keren Hayesod event.

Avraham Avi-hai (Hebrew: אברהם אביחי; 23 January 1931 – 3 December 2023) was an Israeli civil servant, journalist and author who was a member of the Jewish Agency for Israel and World Zionist Organization executives. He served on the staff of Israel's first prime minister, David Ben-Gurion, as secretary for public affairs to Prime Minister Levi Eshkol, and as World Chairman of Keren Hayesod–United Israel Appeal (1978 to 1988).

A reporter for The Jerusalem Post, Avi-hai was the author of several books, including Ben-Gurion, State-Builder: Principles and Pragmatism, 1948-1963; Danger! Three Jewish Peoples; and A Tale of Two Avrahams. He was a founding dean (associate dean) of the Hebrew University's Rothberg International School for Overseas Students and was visiting professor at the University of Rochester in the United States and at York University in Canada.

== Biography ==
Syd Applebaum (later Avraham Avi-hai) was born in Toronto, Canada on 23 January 1931, to a Yiddish-speaking and traditional Zionist family.

As an adolescent, he led the renewal of Hashomer Hadati, the religious Zionist youth movement in Toronto, whose aim was to educate towards building the Jewish homeland by egalitarian religious kibbutzim. He spent a year at an agricultural training center, and a further year in Toronto leading the youth movement which had merged into Bnei Akiva. Avi-hai married Hannah Adinah (Anne) Spiegel in late 1949.

Avi-hai moved to Israel together with his wife in 1952. Initially he lived and worked as a farmer and construction laborer on a kibbutz then called Kfar Darom (known today as Bnei Darom), but soon moved to Jerusalem and entered journalism, becoming a politics and economics reporter at The Jerusalem Post, hired by its founding editor, Gershon Agron, who became mayor of Jerusalem.

Avi-hai later was appointed deputy director and director of public relations in the Israel Bonds Jerusalem office. He was recruited into government service by future Jerusalem Mayor Teddy Kollek and appointed director of the Overseas Division in David Ben-Gurion's Prime Minister's Office, and then as secretary for public affairs to Prime Levi Minister Eshkol. The Overseas Division's aims were to coordinate overseas information by the various ministries and national institutions, and to create close relationships with all Jewish religious streams and organizations, especially in North America. In an effort to have each religious stream establish its world center in Jerusalem, he helped the Conservative movement locate the area for establishing Neve Schechter in Jerusalem which has developed into the Schechter Institute of Jewish Studies. He assisted the Reform Jewish leadership in opening the Hebrew Union College in Jerusalem. He encouraged mayors to rent municipal facilities for the first Reform prayer services, “in accordance with the Israeli Declaration of Independence regarding freedom of religion.”

Avi-hai was Levi Eshkol's English speech-writer from 1955 until 1965, covering most of Eshkol's period as finance minister and his first years as prime minister and with whom he developed a close relationship. Avi-hai was a member of the 10-person official delegation that accompanied Eshkol on the historic first state visit of an Israeli Prime Minister to the United States at the invitation of President Lyndon B. Johnson in June 1954. He then Hebraicized his name, which contains components of the first name of his parents.

During the late 1960s and early 1970s, Avi-hai helped lay the groundwork for Israel's future high-tech economy by organizing the Prime Minister's Jerusalem Economic Conferences of 1968–1971. From 1978 to 1988, he served as the World Chairman of Keren Hayesod-United Israel Appeal, the fundraising arm of the Zionist movement.

=== Education and academic work ===
On leave from the Prime Minister's Office, Avi-hai returned to North America to further the studies he interrupted when he came to Israel (1966-mid-1968). He received his bachelor's degree from the Jewish Theological Seminary, New York, and his Master of Arts and Doctor of Philosophy degrees at Columbia University in New York (Political Science). Previously, he had studied at the University of Toronto and at Yeshiva University, New York.

In the early 1970s, Avi-hai was founding dean of the School for Overseas Students of Hebrew University of Jerusalem and its vice-provost. He was visiting professor of history at the University of Rochester in the US and at York University in Canada and taught Political Studies at Hebrew and Bar-Ilan universities. Avi-hai was a member emeritus of the Hebrew University's board of governors, on which he served actively for over two decades. He was also founding associate chairman with Sam Rothberg (chairman) of the board of overseers of the Rothberg International School of Hebrew University, as the Overseas School was later named.

=== Journalism ===
During his early years in Israel, Avi-hai worked as a reporter for The Jerusalem Post, Israel's English-language daily newspaper, as a news editor and announcer on Kol Israel English broadcasts, as acting director of Kol Zion LaGolah, Israel's overseas broadcasting service and as a correspondent for the Canadian Broadcasting Corporation. In the latter capacity he covered the trial of Nazi mass murderer Adolf Eichmann. Following his retirement from public life Avi-hai returned to journalism, writing a column for The Jerusalem Post and later for The Jerusalem Report.

=== Zionist activism ===
During his tenure as head of the United Israel Appeal, Avi-hai placed special emphasis on strengthening the Young Leadership and the Women's Divisions, stressing that Keren Hayesod was a family, and should activate individual families as well. He told The Jerusalem Post in 2008 that “as somebody who wanted, and wants, Diaspora Jewry to live and have a relationship with Israel, I tried very much to turn the United Israel Appeal into an educational movement. Rather than say, ‘Gevalt! Missiles are falling here, so give money,’ I was saying, ‘We are giving you an opportunity to share in state-building. We are partners. If you can't come to Israel, or don't want to, at least pay taxes.’ This was not philanthropy in the usual sense.”

=== Religious and political views ===
Avi-hai, who grew up orthodox, said that he came to Israel to be a “total Jew” and that “the kibbutz and egalitarianism were values” that he had received at home.

“They were essential parts of my Judaism. Therefore, coming to Israel was an important part of my Judaism. At the time I was more halachic [observant], and as I've studied over the years, I am trying more and more to internalize the human side of the commandments - the mitzvot between man and man - how we relate to other people in everything we do.

He also said that he believed that just as the ultra-orthodox have been “deprived of a richness of general knowledge, the secular younger generation, in addition to a lack of general knowledge, has been deprived of Jewish knowledge. And they don't even know what secular means. Secular does not mean a lack of observance. It means knowing what your Jewishness is, and celebrating it the way you celebrate it.”

== Books ==
Avi-hai published a number of books on Israel and Jewish topics. In 1974 he published Ben-Gurion, State-Builder: Principles and Pragmatism, 1948-1963. The book is based on his doctoral thesis and has been printed in English, Hebrew, French and Spanish.

In 1993, he published Danger! Three Jewish Peoples, a controversial analysis of the widening rift between Jews in Israel and the Diaspora.

In 2014, Avi-hai's first novel, titled A Tale of Two Avrahams, was published in English, several years after first appearing in Hebrew. A combination of modern thriller and historical fiction, the book the story of two men named Avraham, one fleeing the Catholic Inquisition in medieval Italy, the other from renegade Jewish fanatics in contemporary Israel.

== Personal life ==
In 1949, Avi-hai married Hannah Adina (Anne) Spiegel in Toronto. Their three daughters were born in Jerusalem. Divorced in 1982, he married Henrietta Wagner (Bassan), a native of the United States who has two sons. He had three daughters, two stepsons, and including grandchildren, spouses and great-grandchildren, the four-generation family numbers over 60. He lived in Jerusalem's Yemin Moshe neighborhood facing the walls of the Old City of Jerusalem beginning in 1976.

Avraham Avi-hai died on 3 December 2023, at the age of 92.

== Awards and recognition ==
Avi-hai was named Outstanding Student at the Jewish Theological Seminary in 1967.

The Avi-hai Prize for Young Leadership was initiated by Keren Hayesod in 1989.
