= Furra =

Legendary queen in Ethiopia

- Born: Sidama, Ethiopia
- Known for: Medieval queen of the Sidama region

Furra or Fura was a medieval queen (Nigist) of the Sidama region in southern Ethiopia. According to oral tradition, she ruled for about seven years in the 14th or 15th century, encouraging the women and oppressing the men, especially the bald, old and short ones. Her reign ended when the men tricked her into a ride upon a wild steed, which tore her apart. Places in Sidama are still named after her body parts, which were scattered in this last ride.

== Early life ==
There are no written records from that time so her history is based upon oral tradition. According to this, she was born around the fourteenth or fifteenth century in Sidama. She was of the Sidama people, but there is no agreement on her clan. It has been suggested that she may have been from Hawella Gadire, Yanassie, Kusaye or Sawolla. She was the first child of a first wife and this gave her status and privilege. Some accounts say that she married a powerful chief, Dingama Koyya, who was known for his great power, erecting stone stelae and statues which still exist today. Their son was powerful too and the people so feared them that both father and son were killed. Furra then took power as queen. Other accounts say that she had a daughter, Laango.

== Reign ==
After Ahmad ibn Ibrahim al-Ghazi expelled the Amhara, the Hoofa, (inhabitants of Sidama before the Sidama migrated there) suppressed the Sidama, and installed Furra as queen. She presided over a matriarchal administration and was styled the "Queen of the Women" (mentu biilo) rather than "Queen of Sidama" due to her partisanship for women. She was considered wise and advised women against submitting to men. She also counselled women to keep men guessing, and cover their private parts as well as taking care of their beauty. After observing male cowardice in battle, she relegated the men to menial duties while organizing the women to do the fighting. She set them impossible tasks, such as gathering water with a sieve.

She purged the men, especially executing those who were bald, old or short. Old men were selected because elders are respected in Sidama society and so might oppose her effectively. One old wise man asked the other men for help and he was hidden in a riverside cave or well where he became their secret advisor. When the queen demanded a castle in the air, the wise old man told the men that they should ask her to lay the foundations. She had to do this on the ground and so a conventional house could then be built.

She ruled for about seven years, continuing to oppress the men. She finally demanded a fast steed to carry her throughout the realm and into battle. The hidden old man advised the other men to capture a wild animal, like a giraffe, and then tie her to it. This was done and then the powerful animal tore her apart as it galloped off. According to legend, her body parts fell in different places which are now named after them: Anga (hand), Leka (leg), and Oun (head)

Her shoulders dropped in Qorke,
Her waist dropped in Hallo
Her limbs dropped in Dassie
Her genitals dropped in Saala
Her remains dropped in Kuura

In these places, the men still beat the ground in disgust while the women pour milk in homage.

== Legacy ==
She remains a popular legend in the oral culture of the Sidama people and her story continues to be told. Each sex has its own song about her. The men sing in outrage

During Furra's reign
Men ground and cooked for women
Let her die, let her die!

while the women sing in sympathy

Sleep, sleep my children
Sleep, sleep my children
You're my best child
For they killed the best
Furra, you're the leader of woman!

The Sidama Cultural Centre in Awasa, which was built in 1984, has a mural of Queen Fura. A college founded in 1996 in Irgalem was named Fura after the queen but its accreditation was suspended in 2011. In 2016, Teshome Birhanu published a book in Amharic called: Nigist Fura, lit. 'Queen Fura' that celebrates her as a visionary monarch. Author and traveler Elizabeth Laird collected the Fura legend from storyteller Abebe Kebede at Lake Awassa, as she recounts in her book The Lure of the Honey Bird: the storytellers of Ethiopia. She compares Fura with Queen Gudit.

== See also ==
- Arawelo, a similar queen of the Somali people
- Gudit, a warrior queen of the Ethiopian Jews
