= The Times of Israel =

Israeli online newspaper

- Home page of The Times of Israel on 30 July 2026
- Type: Online newspaper
- Founders: David Horovitz; Seth Klarman
- Editor-in-chief: David Horovitz
- Editor: Suha Halifa (Arabic); Stephanie Bitan (French); Avi Davidi (Persian)
- Deputy editor: Joshua Davidovich; Elie Leshem; Amanda Borschel-Dan
- Opinion editor: Miriam Herschlag
- Launched: February 2012; 14 years ago
- Political alignment: Centre
- Language: English, Hebrew, Arabic, French, Persian
- Headquarters: Jerusalem
- ISSN: 0040-7909
- OCLC number: 1076401854
- Website: timesofisrael.com

The Times of Israel (ToI) is an Israeli multi-language online newspaper that was launched in 2012 and has since become the largest English-language Jewish and Israeli news source by audience size. It was co-founded by Israeli journalist David Horovitz, who is also the founding editor, and American billionaire investor Seth Klarman. Based in Jerusalem, it "documents developments in Israel, the Middle East and around the Jewish world." Along with its original English site, The Times of Israel publishes in Hebrew (via its own edition, Zman Yisrael), Arabic, French, and Persian. In addition to publishing news reports and analysis, the website hosts a multi-author blog platform.

In February 2014, two years after its launch, The Times of Israel claimed a readership of two million. In 2017, readership increased to 3.5 million unique monthly users. By 2021, the paper had on average over nine million unique users each month and over 35 million monthly pageviews, according to its press kit, while the paper's blog platform had 9,000 active bloggers. In 2025, the press kit listed an audience of 8 million unique monthly users, comprising 25 million monthly visits and 75 million monthly pageviews. Website ranking company Similarweb listed the site's traffic as 45 million visits in June 2025, with more than half the traffic originating in the United States, with liaison journalists stationed in New York City.

== History ==
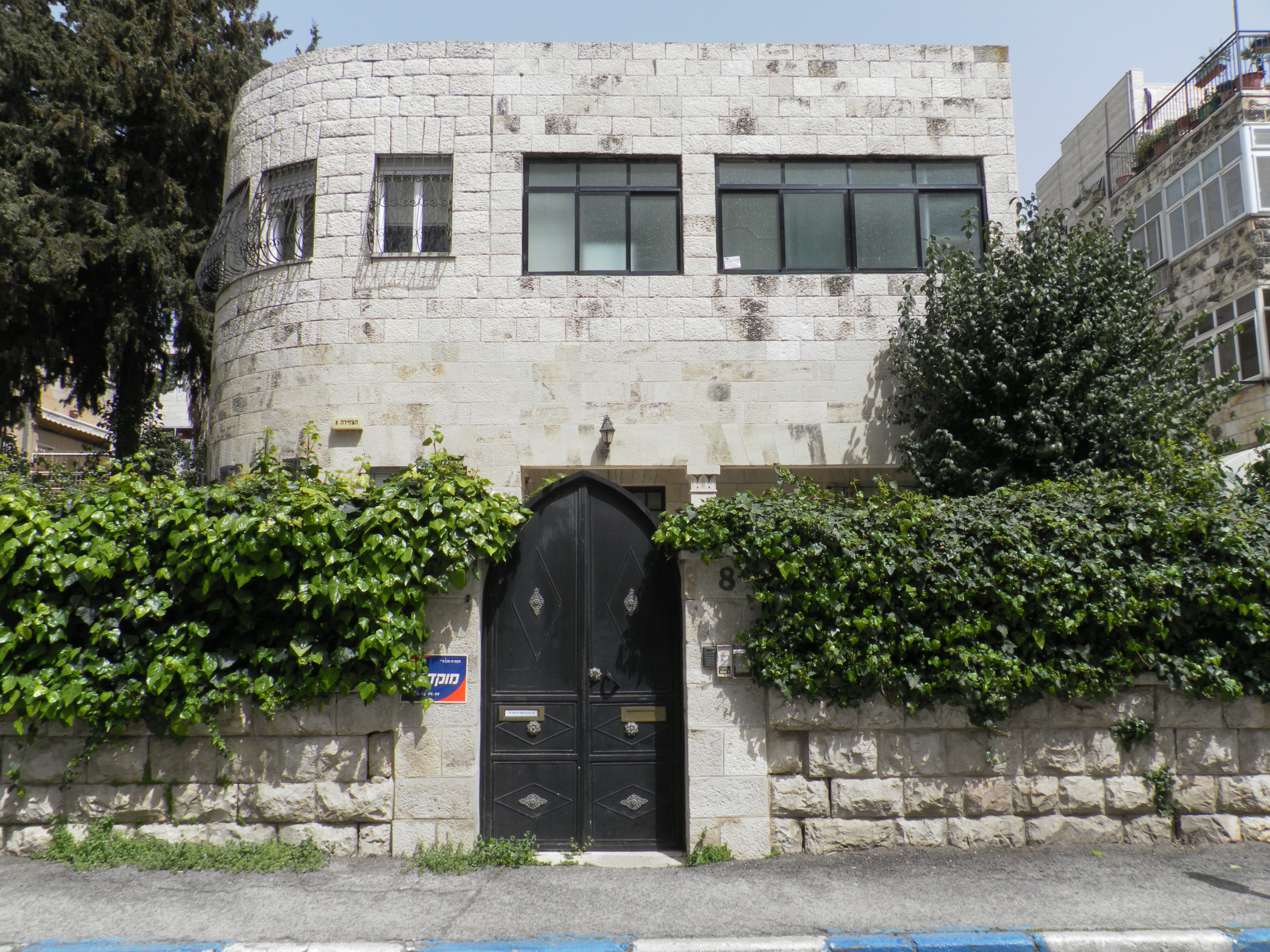
Headquarters of ToI in Jerusalem (2012)

The Times of Israel was launched in February 2012. Its co-founders are journalist David Horovitz, and American billionaire Seth Klarman, founder of the Baupost Group and chairman of The David Project. Klarman is the chairman of the website. The Times of Israel launched its Arabic edition, edited by Suha Halifa, on 4 February 2014; its French edition, edited by Stephanie Bitan, on 25 February 2014; and its Persian edition, edited by Avi Davidi, on 7 October 2015.

Both the Arabic and French editions combine translations of English content with original material in their respective languages, and also host a blog platform. Comments on news articles and features in all of the site's editions can only be posted by readers identified through their Facebook profiles or equivalent.

Since 2016, The Times of Israel has hosted the websites of Jewish newspapers in several countries, known as "local partners". In March 2016, it began hosting New York's The Jewish Week. It also hosts Britain's Jewish News, the New Jersey Jewish Standard, The Atlanta Jewish Times, and Pittsburgh Jewish Chronicle.

On 2 November 2017, hackers in Turkey took down the website of The Times of Israel for three hours, replacing the homepage with anti-Israel propaganda. Responding to the attack, Horovitz said: "We constantly work to improve security on the site, which is subjected to relentless attacks by hackers. How unfortunate, and how badly it reflects on them that the hackers seek to prevent people from reading responsible, independent journalism on Israel, the Middle East and the Jewish world".

In February 2019, The Times of Israel launched a website for its Hebrew language edition, Zman Yisrael. Birnit Goren was appointed editor-in-chief of Zman Yisrael, whose editorial team is based in Tel Aviv. In October 2019, The Australian Jewish News became the seventh local partner of The Times of Israel.

In 2020, Reuters reported that The Times of Israel, along with The Jerusalem Post, Algemeiner, and Arutz Sheva, published op-eds sent to them by someone using a falsified identity. The op-eds were removed as soon as the problem was discovered. Opinion editor Miriam Herschlag said that she regretted the scam because it distorted the public discourse and might lead to "barriers that prevent new voices from being heard".

== Editorial position ==
The Times of Israel is considered to be "centrist" by various sources. The Jewish Independent described The Times of Israel as centrist but critical of Benjamin Netanyahu. Courrier International described the Zman Yisrael, sister website of The Times of Israel in Hebrew, as centrist.

According to editor David Horovitz, The Times of Israel is intended to be independent, without any political leanings. Horovitz said in 2012: "We are independent; we're not attached or affiliated with any political party".

== Readership ==
The Times of Israel competes for readership with The Jerusalem Post, Arutz Sheva, Haaretz daily English edition, Israel Hayom, and The Forward.

In February 2014, two years after its launch, The Times of Israel claimed a readership of 2 million. In 2017, readership of the paper increased to 3.5 million. By 2021, The Times of Israel had on average over 9 million unique users each month and over 35 million monthly page views. In November 2023, the site saw web visits increase 604% year-on-year to 64.2 million and entered the Press Gazette's top-50 ranking for the first time in 42nd place, according to digital intelligence platform, Similarweb.

== Third-party blogging ==
The Times of Israel has offered a third-party blogging platform since 2012 which allows writers who are not affiliated with the news site to publish articles online. The articles on this platform are clearly marked as such, and Times of Israel staff does not oversee or edit the content from outside users published on the blogging platform. The Times of Israel has at times removed content that has violated the site's policies. This platform has occasionally brought about controversy for the newspaper with inflammatory and controversial blog pieces that were later removed. These pieces written by third-party users have sometimes been confused for or misrepresented as the endorsed original work of The Times of Israel, leading to criticism of the newspaper itself. As of 2013, it was estimated that The Times of Israel hired more than 1,500 bloggers. By 2019, the platform had 9,000 bloggers.

=== Removed blog posts ===
On 1 August 2014, blogger Yochanan Gordon wrote a blog post titled "When Genocide is Permissible", which discussed the 2014 Gaza War. The post was removed in less than a minute after it was uploaded and was condemned by a spokeswoman of The Times of Israel, who described it as "damnable and ignorant". She said it violated ToI's editorial guidelines. The blog post questioned whether committing genocide against the people of Gaza was morally justifiable, since Hamas would never accept peace.

On 9 April 2015, a blog post titled "Understanding the Idea of Israeli Land Under Talmudic Law" with a byline of Australian lawyer Josh Bornstein referred to the Palestinians as "cockroaches" and "worthless subhuman beasts and vermin" and called to "exterminate them". The post was heavily criticized on social media and subsequently removed by Times of Israel along with Bornstein's author page for being "inappropriate/satire". Josh Bornstein said on Twitter that he was not involved in the creation of the post. Writing for The Guardian, Bornstein explained that he had nothing to do with the post nor The Times of Israel and was a victim of identity theft by an American neo-Nazi group that wanted to defame him. The blog post was shared on social media and led to Bornstein receiving threats, including from a Twitter account linked to the Islamic State.

In May 2023, Chicago-based blogger Jeffrey Camras wrote a blog post in which he stated, "In order to right a wrong, in order to make peace and move forward, Palestine must be obliterated." Camras also claimed that Palestinian nationality was "a lie". Genocide scholar Raz Segal cited this as an example of genocidal rhetoric in the Israeli discourse. The post was subsequently removed after receiving criticism on social media and The Times of Israel's comment section.

== Additional media ==
In addition to written journalism, The Times of Israel produces and publishes three podcasts; it also produces video content:

- The Daily Briefing, a daily news podcast.
- Times Will Tell, a long-form weekly revue.
- Paralyzed Nation, a deep look into the Israeli political system.

== Notable writers ==
- Haviv Rettig Gur
- David Horovitz
- Avi Issacharoff

== See also ==
- Mass media in Israel
