= Arawelo =

Legendary proto-Somali queen

Queen Arawelo (Somali: Boqorad Carraweelo; also spelled Arrawelo, Araweelo, Arraweelo, or Arawailo), also known as Ebla Awad, was a proto-Somali Queen in traditional folklore.

== Biography ==
Arawelo is said to have been based in lands inhabited by the Habr Je'lo clan, specifically a place called Murihi in the Sanaag region. Ralph E. Drake-Brockman was one of the first Western researchers to publish an account of Arawelo, in his 1912 book British Somaliland he states:

The story says that thousands of years ago there lived in what is now the tract of country occupied by the Habr Toljaala tribe, a great black queen called Arawailo, who was greatly feared by her people owing to her eccentricities. Arawailo lived at a place called Murihi, so the story goes, for little save a huge mound of stones, under which she is said to lie buried, now marks the capital of her ancient kingdom. Towards the end of her life Arawailo began to show marked favour towards her own sex and great animosity towards her male subjects.

Semi-biographical tales which give many personal details of this queen are given. For instance, Arawelo's mother was said to have been called Haramaanyo; but no mention is made in the tales about who her father was. She was the first born of three daughters and natural heir to the dynasty. Like many female rulers, Arawelo fought for female empowerment; she believed society should be based on a matriarchy. Under her reign, it was also common for men to have their testicles tortured as a form of punishment, including punishments that involved hanging them by the testicles.

The versions told about her punishments against men vary, but there is a tendency that points to her policy of castrating men. It is believed that many, if not all, male prisoners at the time were castrated under her command.

Interpretations of Arawelo's life and reign vary widely, ranging from a feminist heroine who fight against male oppression to a cruel emasculator queen who ripped off the genitals of hundreds of men.

== Location ==
Drake-Brockman reports that the location of her Kingdom was centred around a location called Murihi in then British Somaliland, today part of Sanaag region. Her throne was passed down to an unknown next of kin.

== Defying gender roles ==
During her reign, Arawelo's husband objected to her self-ascribed role as the breadwinner to all of society, as he thought women should restrict themselves to merely domestic duties about the house and leave everything else to men. In response, Arawelo demanded that all women across the land abandon their womanly role in society.

Arawelo thought this role reversal was necessary since she saw women as natural peacekeepers. Growing up she believed that women were not treated well and the men were more often instigators, participants and conductors of war and politics. She not only fought for the liberation of women in feudal society but for the dominance of women as she saw them as better and more efficient leaders.

== In popular culture ==
References to Carawelo in Somali culture today include nicknaming a girl/woman who is very assertive and dominant "Caraweelo". She is also, by one source, claimed to have been the Harla queen of the ancient Somali people, but this does not conform with the fact that she is just commonly interpreted as a folkloric figure. Opinions on her legacy vary widely, with critics denouncing her for her androcidal nature and introducing the practise of infibulation, a type of FGM, while supporters eulogize her gynocentric attempts at female empowerment.

Farah M. Mohamed published a book about her in 2014.

Arawelo is featured in Rejected Princesses.

Several authors have narrated the legend of Arawelo including Margaret Laurence in A Tree for Poverty (1954) as well as Omar Osman Rabeh in Le Cercle et la spirale (1984).

In 2017, the Somali Canadian singer Cold Specks released the single "Fool's Paradise", which is a song about queen Arawelo. She was inspired by the song of Khadra Dahir Cige about Arawelo that she listened to when she was little and she finds the emasculator queen's story to be empowering.

== See also ==
- Furra, legendary 15th century queen of the Sidama people
- Gudit, 10th century queen who brought an end to the Kingdom of Aksum
