= Ga'ewa =

Ga'ewa or Ga‘ǝwa (Ge'ez: ጋዕዋ) was a Muslim regent in the north of the Horn of Africa in the sixteenth century. Her kingdom stretched from Metemma in the west to the area south of the Mareb river in the Ethiopian province of Tigray.

According to the Chronicle of King Gälawdewos, an account of the reign of the Ethiopian emperor Gälawdewos (1540–59), Ga'ewa was the queen of Säläwa, a region in central Tigray. According to the Arabic Futūḥ al-Ḥabasha (Conquest of Abyssinia), an account of the campaigns of Aḥmad ibn Ibrahim (died 1543), she was the queen of Mäzäga, a region that has not been conclusively identified. It has been located north of the Tekezé river and bordering the Funj Sultanate in the west.

After the death of her brother, Mäkättar, sultan of Mäzäga, she took over the regency on behalf of her nephew Nafî. The Futūḥ al-Ḥabasha describes her as "a woman of good counsel, intelligent and wise". She reportedly launched several raids against the Christian Ethiopian Empire. In 1557, the Ottomans under Özdemür Pasha took Massawa from the bahr negus Yeshaq and massacred the monks of Debre Damo. In a counteroffensive, Yeshaq defeated the Ottomans and invaded Mäzäga. Ga'ewa's troops were defeated and she fled to Debarwa and the protection of the Ottomans. She tried to persuade Özdemür to liberate Mäzäga by telling him where she had hidden her treasure, but Yeshaq took Debarwa before the Ottomans could mount an expedition.

In folklore and oral traditions, Ga'ewa is often confused with the semi-legendary tenth-century Ethiopian queen Gudit (Yodit). In some places, such as the village of Addi Akaweh, they are explicitly identified as one and the same person. Another tradition makes her the wife of imam Aḥmad. The oral traditions of the village of Sǝfra Ga‘ǝwa depict its namesake as a wealthy woman with several herds of cattle.

== Places named after her ==
- Addi Ga‘ǝwa ("country of Ga'ewa")
- Qǝṣri Ga‘ǝwa ("enceinte of Ga'ewa")
- Mǝ‘raf Ga‘ǝwa ("resting place of Ga'ewa")
- Mäqabǝr Ga‘ǝwa ("tomb of Ga'ewa")
- Sǝfra Ga‘ǝwa ("place of Ga'ewa")
