= Gudit =

Queen of the Kingdom of Semien in the 10th-11th century

Yudit
- Queen of Semien

Queen of Simien
- Reign: c.960 A.D.-c.1000 C.E.
- Predecessor: Gideon IV
- Born: Begwena, Kingdom of Aksum
- Died: c.1000 A.D.
- Spouse: Zenobis
- Dynasty: House of Gideon
- Father: Gideon IV
- Religion: Judaism (?)

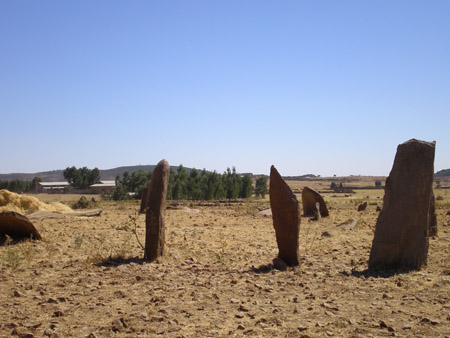
Gudit stela field, Aksum, Ethiopia

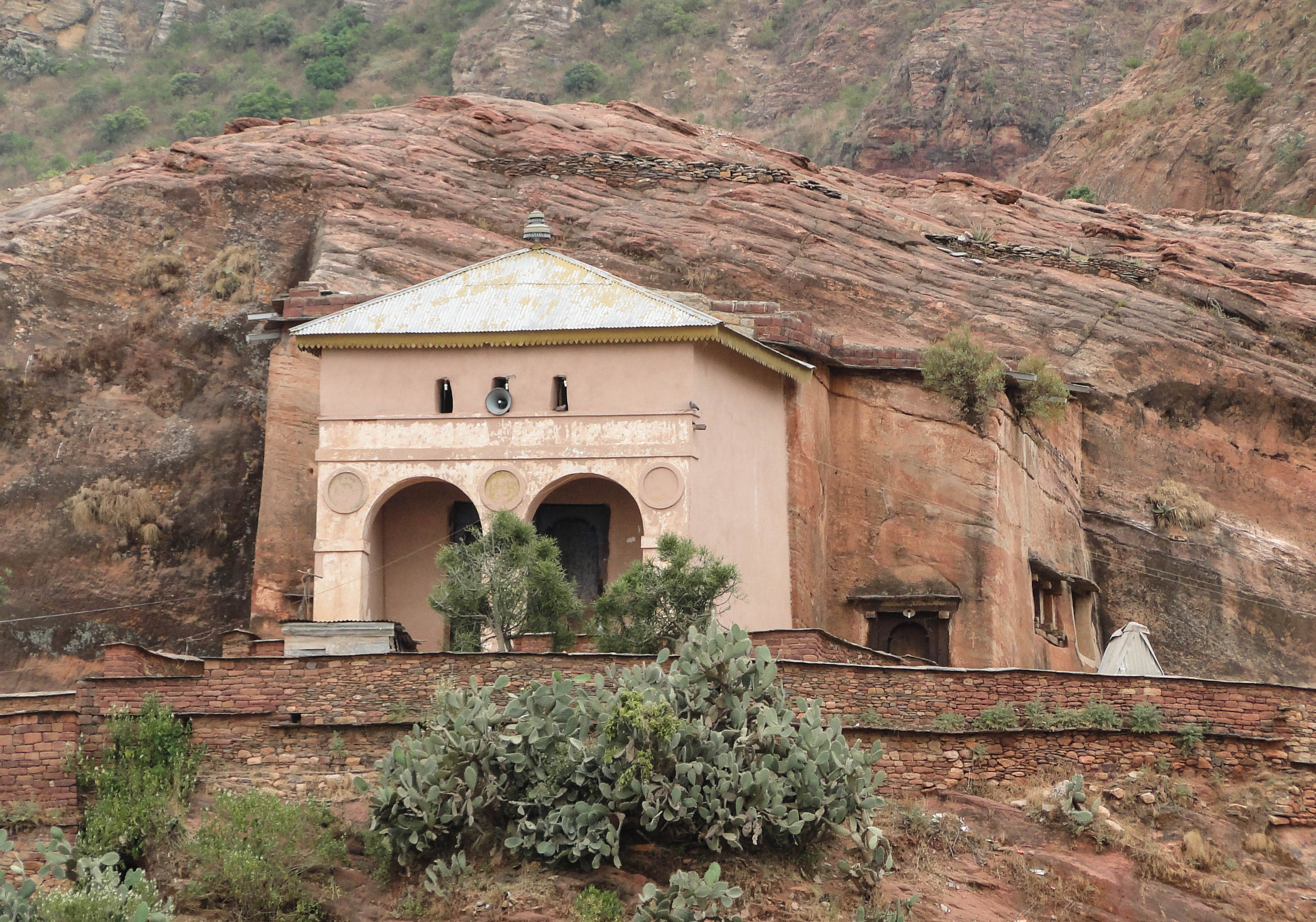
Abreha and Atsbeha Church

Gudit (Ge'ez: ጉዲት)(fl. c. 960) was a 10th century queen, also known as Yodit in Tigrinya, and Amharic, but also Isato in Amharic, and Ga'wa in Ţilţal. The person behind these various alternative names was a powerful female ruler, probably Masoba Warq, the daughter of the last Aksumite king, Dil Na'od, mentioned in an early Arabic source. (Note: "In spite of the different names and other variations in the story, there can be no doubt that the two traditions deal with the same woman and the same reality; namely that a strong female ruler rose to power in Ethiopia, ended Aksumite rule and made way for the Zagwe dynasty which became so despised by posterity." (Andersen 2000, pp. 31–32)) She was mentioned (though not by name) by Ibn Hawqal in his Surat al-Ard, and she is said to have been responsible for laying waste to the Kingdom of Aksum and its countryside, and the destruction of its churches and monuments in the 10th century AD. If she is the same as the Tirda' Gābāz in other Ethiopian sources, (Note: In the king list, however Gudit is placed 4th in line while Tirda' Gābāz is 13th (Andersen 2000, p. 46).) she is also said to have attempted to exterminate the members of the ruling dynasty. (Note: Tirda' Gābāz is said to have had murdered almost the entire royal family of Solomonic descent, the exception being a royal youth who managed to escape to Shāwa where the nobility gave him refuge (Andersen 2000, p. 46).)

== Name ==
The name "Gudit" in the Geʽez narrative associates her positively with the Biblical Judith. It has been conjectured that the form Gudit is connected etymologically with the Amharic word gud which connotes a range of meanings from "freak" and "monster" to "strange" and "wonderful". According to Caroline Levi, her alternative name "Isato", aside from meaning "fire", bears a similar set of meanings. The Ţilţal name for her, Ga'wa indicates she came to be associated with a 16th century Muslim queen of that name, (Note: This Ga'wa was related to the figure in Amharic history of Imam Ahmād Gragñ who invaded Ethiopia and almost overthrew its Christian rulers, until defeat in the Wayna Daga area caused the invading forces to withdraw (Andersen 2000, p. 39, n.24).) something which suggests that the traditions concerning Gudit took centuries to achieve their final form. In one of the Ethiopian kinglists, mention is made of a certain Tirda' Gābāz as the last queen of Aksum. The tales told of her exploits are almost identical with those associated with Māsobā Wārq.

== History and stories ==
There are two versions of the tradition about Gudit.

- She was a princess of Gideon IV, the King of the Jewish Kingdom of Beta Israel (Kingdom of Simien). After her father was killed in battle with the Aksumite Empire, Gudit inherited his throne. Eventually, she defeated the Aksumite.
- She was a banished princess of Aksum. She married Zenobis, a Syrian prince, and converted to Judaism. Eventually, she conquered Aksum with her husband and people of Hahayle, her mother's homeland.

Information about Gudit is contradictory and incomplete. Paul B. Henze wrote, "She is said to have killed the emperor, ascended the throne herself, and reigned for 40 years. Accounts of her violent misdeeds are still related among peasants in the north Ethiopian countryside." Henze continues in a footnote:

On my first visit to the rock church of Abreha and Atsbeha in eastern Tigray in 1970, I noticed that its intricately carved ceiling was blackened by soot. The priest explained it as the work of Gudit, who had piled the church full of hay and set it ablaze nine centuries before.

Gudit is recorded as having written a decree saying “churches should be closed because I am a Jewess and my husband is also a Jew”. In one manuscript she is said to have crowned herself empress.

There is a tradition that Gudit sacked and burned Debre Damo, an amba which at the time was a treasury and a prison for the male relatives of the king; this may be an echo of the later capture and sack of Amba Geshen by Ahmad ibn Ibrahim al-Ghazi.

However, James Bruce presented a tradition that Dil Na'ad was overthrown by Gudit, and that Mara Takla Haymanot (whom Bruce calls "Takla Haymanot") was a cousin of Gudit who succeeded her after several of her own family. Bruce also reports a story that the royal family were at this time, in virtue of the old law, confined on the almost inaccessible mountain of Damo in Tigray, and that after the death of Ayzur, and a plague in the capital of Abyssinia, Gudit used this opportunity to attack Damo, seize control, and quote “slew the whole princes there, to the number, it is said, of about 400.”

In oral tradition, Gudit is sometimes conflated with the 16th-century Muslim queen Ga'ewa of Tigray.

== Ethnicity ==
Carlo Conti Rossini first proposed that the account of this warrior queen in the History of the Patriarchs of Alexandria, where she was described as Bani al-Hamwiyah, ought to be read as Bani al-Damutah, and argued that she was ruler of the once-powerful Kingdom of Damot, and that she was related to one of the indigenous Sidama people of southern Ethiopia. (Note: Conti Rossini's argument is taken from Taddesse Tamrat's summary (Tamrat 1972, p. 39).)

Modern historian Enrico Cerulli discovered Arabic documents that mention a Muslim queen named Badit daughter of Maya in the tenth century who reigned under the Makhzumi dynasty. According to historian Tekeste Negash, Gudit was a Cushitic queen based at Lake Hayq in Wollo Province of Ethiopia. He further explains that there may have been a regional power struggle between Aksum and this queen of Wollo whom had ties to Yemeni traders through the port of Zeila.

In more recent perspectives on the issue of the ethnicity of Gudit, there has been less certainty on to her actual identity and yet more certainty on the unlikelihood of her being of Judaic belief or associated with the Beta Israel. According to Steven Kaplan:

Despite the Judith legend's popularity and its prominent position in the traditions of both Jews and Christians to this day, there appears to be several good reasons for rejecting the depiction of the tenth century queen of the Bani al-Hamwiyah as a Falasha. Although some Ethiopic sources do portray Yodit as a Jewess, these generally identify her as a convert rather than the product of a well entrenched indigenous religious community. The material recorded by Bruce, which contains the earliest complete account of the legend, must be considered suspect on several grounds...

The suggestion that the Falasha queen Yodit, putative conqueror of Aksum, is in fact the pagan queen of the Sidama, vanquisher of the haḍani is not as startling as it might appear at first glance. By transforming the queen from a pagan to a Jewess and her primary area of activity from the south of Aksum, Christian tradition neatly places her within the primary categories of Ethiopian political-religious discourse. On some levels, the Judith traditions can be said to mirror the themes of the Kebra Nagast. Both the Queen of Sheba and Judith are depicted as converts to Judaism.

== Historical evidence ==
It was during the office of Pope Philotheos of Alexandria when Gudit started her revolt, near the end of the reign of the king who had deposed the Abuna Petros. According to Taddesse Tamrat, "his own death in the conflict, and the military reverses of the kingdom were taken as divine retribution for the sufferings of Abuna Petros."

This chronological synchronicity with the tenure of Patriarch Philotheos, and the intervention of king Georgios II of Makuria, provides us a date of ca. 960 for Gudit. A contemporary Arab historian, Ibn Hawqal, provides this account:

The country of the habasha has been ruled by a woman for many years now: she has killed the king of the habasha who was called Haḍani [from Geʽez haṣ́ani, modern aṣ́e or atse]. Until today she rules with complete independence in her own country and the frontier areas of the country of the Haḍani, in the southern part of [the country of] the habashi. (Note: Habasha is the Arabic form of the toponym "Abyssinia" (Ethiopia) (Tamrat 1972, p. 39).)

Another historian mentions that the king of Yemen sent a zebra to the ruler of Iraq in 969/970, which he had received as a gift from the Queen of al-Habasha.

== In popular culture ==
Yodit features in the video game Age of Empires II HD: The African Kingdoms. The story is based on a Ge'ez tradition that she was a ruler who was exiled: With her Syrian husband Zānobis, she returns, and rallying people from her homeland in Hahayle, she destroys Aksum, and by decree declares that she had become Jewish and would persecute the Levites.

== See also ==
- Furra, a queen of the Sidama people
- Arawelo, a queen in Somalia
- Kingdom of Simien

== Sources ==
- Andersen, Knud Tage (2000). "The Queen of the Habasha in Ethiopian History, Tradition and Chronology". Bulletin of the School of Oriental & African Studies. 63 (1): 31–63. doi:10.1017/S0041977X00006443. JSTOR 1559587.
- Briggs, Philip (10 December 2018). Ethiopia. Bradt Travel Guides. p. 22. ISBN 978-1-78477-099-0.
- Bruce, James (1804). Travels to Discover the Source of the Nile. Vol. 2. James Ballantyne. ISBN 978-3-7524-0515-6.
- Fauvelle-Aymar, François-Xavier (April 2013). "Desperately Seeking the Jewish Kingdom of Ethiopia: Benjamin of Tudela and the Horn of Africa (Twelfth Century)". Speculum. 88 (2): 383–404. doi:10.1017/S0038713413000857. JSTOR 23488846. S2CID 163444188.
- "Gudit". Dictionary of African Biography. Oxford University Press. 2011. ISBN 978-0-19-538207-5.
- Henze, Paul B. (2000). Layers of Time: A History of Ethiopia. C. Hurst & Co. Publishers. ISBN 978-1-850-65393-6.
- Kaplan, Steven (1988). "The Invention of Ethiopian Jews: Three Models (Trois approches de l' "invention" des Juifs éthiopiens)". Cahiers d'Études Africaines. 33 (132): 645–658. doi:10.3406/cea.1993.1497. JSTOR 4392496.
- Kaplan, Steven (1992). The Beta Israel: Falasha in Ethiopia: From Earliest Times to the Twentieth Century. New York University Press. ISBN 978-0-814-74848-0.
- Kaplan, Steven (2003). "Betä Əsraʾel". In Uhlig, Siegbert; Bausi, Alessandro; Crummey, Donald; Goldenberg, Gideon; Yemām, Bāya (eds.). Encyclopaedia Aethiopica. Vol. 1. Harrassowitz Verlag. p. 553. ISBN 978-3-447-04746-3.
- Kaplan, Steven (2007). "Beta Israel". Encyclopedia Judaica. Vol. 3 (2nd ed.). Thomson Gale. pp. 499–508. ISBN 978-0-02-865931-2.
- McCoy, Jessica (5 November 2015). "Age of Empires II HD: The African Kingdoms Released!". Age of Empires.
- Munro-Hay, Stuart C. (1991). Aksum: An African Civilisation of Late Antiquity. Edinburgh University Press. ISBN 978-0-748-60106-6.
- Negash, Tekeste (2006). "The Zagwe Period and the Zenith of Urban Culture in Ethiopia, Ca. 930-1270 AD". Africa. 1 (61): 123–124. JSTOR 40761842.
- Pakenham, Thomas (1959). The Mountains of Rasselas: An Ethiopian Adventure. Weidenfeld and Nicolson.
- Pankhurst, Richard (1997). The Ethiopian Borderlands: Essays in Regional History from Ancient Times to the End of the 18th Century. The Red Sea Press. ISBN 978-0-932-41519-6.
- Quirin, James Arthur (1992). The Evolution of the Ethiopian Jews: A History of the Beta Israel (Falasha) to 1920. University of Pennsylvania Press. ISBN 978-0-812-23116-8.
- Rayne, Henry (October 1938). "Queen Araweilo". Blackwood's Magazine. Vol. 238. pp. 568–578. Archived from the original on 27 June 2001.
- Seeman, Don (Summer 1991). "Ethnographers, Rabbis and Jewish Epistemology: The Case of the Ethiopian Jews". Tradition: A Journal of Orthodox Jewish Thought. 25 (4): 13–29. JSTOR 23260928.
- Tamrat, Taddesse (1972). Church and State in Ethiopia, 1270-1527. Clarendon Press. ISBN 978-0-198-21671-1.
- Tamrat, Taddesse (1977). "Ethiopia, the Red Sea and the Horn". In Oliver, Roland (ed.). The Cambridge History of Africa. Vol. 3. Cambridge University Press. ISBN 978-0-521-20981-6.
