= David Horovitz =

Israeli journalist

- דייוויד הוֹרוֹויץ
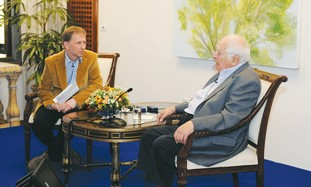
- Horovitz (left) interviewing Bernard Lewis for The Jerusalem Post in 2011
- Born: London, England
- Occupation: Journalist
- Known for: Founder and CEO of The Times of Israel

David Horovitz (Hebrew: דייוויד הוֹרוֹויץ) is a British-born Israeli journalist, author and speaker. He is the founding editor of The Times of Israel, a current affairs website based in Jerusalem that launched in February 2012. Previously, he had been the editor-in-chief of The Jerusalem Post and The Jerusalem Report.

== Biography ==
David Horovitz was born in London, England. He is the great-grandson of Rabbi Márkus Horovitz.

Horovitz immigrated to Israel in 1983. He served in the Education and Youth Corps of the Israel Defense Forces.

== Journalism career ==
Horovitz has worked as the editor of The Jerusalem Post and The Jerusalem Report. In February 2012, together with Seth Klarman of the Baupost Group, Horovitz launched The Times of Israel, an English-language Israeli news website published out of Jerusalem.

Horovitz has also written about Israel for The New York Times, Los Angeles Times, The Irish Times and The Independent in London. He has been interviewed on IBA, CNN, the BBC and NPR.

Horovitz is the author of Still Life with Bombers: Israel in the Age of Terrorism (2004) and of A Little Too Close to God : The Thrills and Panic of a Life in Israel (2000). He edited and co-wrote The Jerusalem Report's 1996 biography of Yitzhak Rabin, Shalom, Friend: The Life and Legacy of Yitzhak Rabin, which won the US National Jewish Book Award for Non-Fiction.

In September 2025, Horovitz visited Damascus, the capital of Syria, after the end of the Syrian civil war the previous year, to report on the situation after the fall of the Assad regime. He traveled with a group of rabbis and other Jews, mostly American, on the invitation of the new Syrian government's Ministry of Foreign Affairs. Israelis and people who have visited Israel are normally forbidden from entering Syria.

== Views and opinions ==
Horovitz had counted himself among Israel’s political left but grew disillusioned with the peace process after the Second Palestinian Intifada. He described himself in 2015 as a member of the "confused middle ground of Israeli politics". His books A Little Too Close to God (2000) and Still Life with Bombers (2004) show admiration of the late Yitzhak Rabin and criticism of Benjamin Netanyahu.

== Published works ==
- Shalom, Friend: The Life and Legacy of Yitzhak Rabin (1996)
- A Little Too Close to God: The Thrills and Panic of a Life in Israel (2000)
- Still Life with Bombers: Israel in the Age of Terrorism (2004)

== Personal life ==
Horovitz is married to Lisa. They have three children.
