= The Jerusalem Report =

Israeli news magazine

- Cover of the September 11, 2017 edition
- Editor: Ruth Marks Eglash
- Categories: Newsmagazine
- Frequency: Semi-monthly
- First issue: 1990
- Company: The Jerusalem Post Group
- Country: Israel
- Based in: Jerusalem
- Language: English
- Website: jpost.com/Jerusalem-Report
- ISSN: 0792-6049

The Jerusalem Report is a fortnightly print and online news magazine that covers political, military, economic, religious and cultural issues in Israel, the Middle East, and the Jewish world.

Founded as an independent weekly publication in 1990, it now publishes 24 issues a year under the corporate umbrella of The Jerusalem Post Group, but remains editorially independent of The Jerusalem Post. The magazine features interviews with prominent personalities and in-depth news coverage, features and analyses, viewpoints and commentaries, book reviews and a backpage cartoon. In addition to the print edition, which has an international circulation of 50,000, The Jerusalem Report is published online on https://www.jpost.com/jerusalem-report.

== History ==
The Jerusalem Report was established in 1990 by South African-born Israeli journalist Hirsh Goodman, who served as its editor-in-chief and publisher for eight years. David Horovitz took over as editor-in-chief from 1998 to 2004, Sharon Ashley from 2004 to 2006, and Eetta Prince-Gibson from 2006 to 2011. They were followed by Matthew Kalman (January to May 2012), Avi Hoffmann (June to November 2012), Ilan Evyatar (December 2012 to May 2017), Steve Linde (June 2017 to January 2025), and Tamar Uriel-Beeri (January to May 2025). Benjamin Glatt, a former managing editor of The Jerusalem Post, was named interim editor in June 2025, and Ruth Marks Eglash, an award-winning journalist, author and former reporter at The Jerusalem Post, was appointed editor in October 2025.

In 1996, The Jerusalem Report editors and staff published a biography of assassinated Prime Minister Yitzhak Rabin, titled Shalom, Friend.

In 1999, The Jerusalem Report correspondent Micha Odenheimer won the American Jewish Joint Distribution Committee's Boris Smolar Award for his cover story titled "The Abandoned Jews of Quara," which led to the airlift of Jews from Ethiopia to Israel.

In 2000, American journalist Jeffrey Goldberg referred to The Jerusalem Report as "the best periodical published in Israel, in English or Hebrew. The Jerusalem Report is a beacon of professionalism and sobriety in a press culture that sometimes resembles the National Hockey League."

In 2004, The Jerusalem Report won the American Jewish Joint Distribution Committee's Boris Smolar Award for its coverage of the Jewish World.

In April 2018, Amotz Asa-El's five-part series on the future of the Jewish people won the B'nai Brith World Center Award for Journalism Recognizing Excellence in Diaspora Reportage.

In July 2018, The Jerusalem Report sparked a media furor after it dismissed its longtime illustrator, Avi Katz, over a cartoon portraying a selfie of Prime Minister Benjamin Netanyahu and lawmakers from his Likud party with pigs' heads, celebrating the passage of the Jewish Nation-State Law in the Knesset, under the title, "All animals are equal but some are more equal than others." The cartoon, a reference to George Orwell’s Animal Farm, was deemed offensive by the magazine's management. Katz was rehired in September 2023.

In July 2023, Maayan Hoffman won two American Jewish Press Association Rockower Awards for articles she wrote in The Jerusalem Report.

In December 2025, The Jerusalem Report merged with The International Jerusalem Post, a weekly edition of The Jerusalem Post launched by the newspaper in 1959 for its global readership.

== Ownership ==
The Jerusalem Report is owned by The Jerusalem Post Group, a Tel Aviv-based company controlled by Israeli businessman Eli Azur. It purchased The Jerusalem Report from Conrad Black's Hollinger in 2004.The Jerusalem Report was initially funded by five philanthropists, including Charles Bronfman, and was sold in 1998 to Hollinger, which also bought The Jerusalem Post.
