= Yaakov Katz (journalist) =

Israeli journalist and author (born 1979)

- יעקב כץ
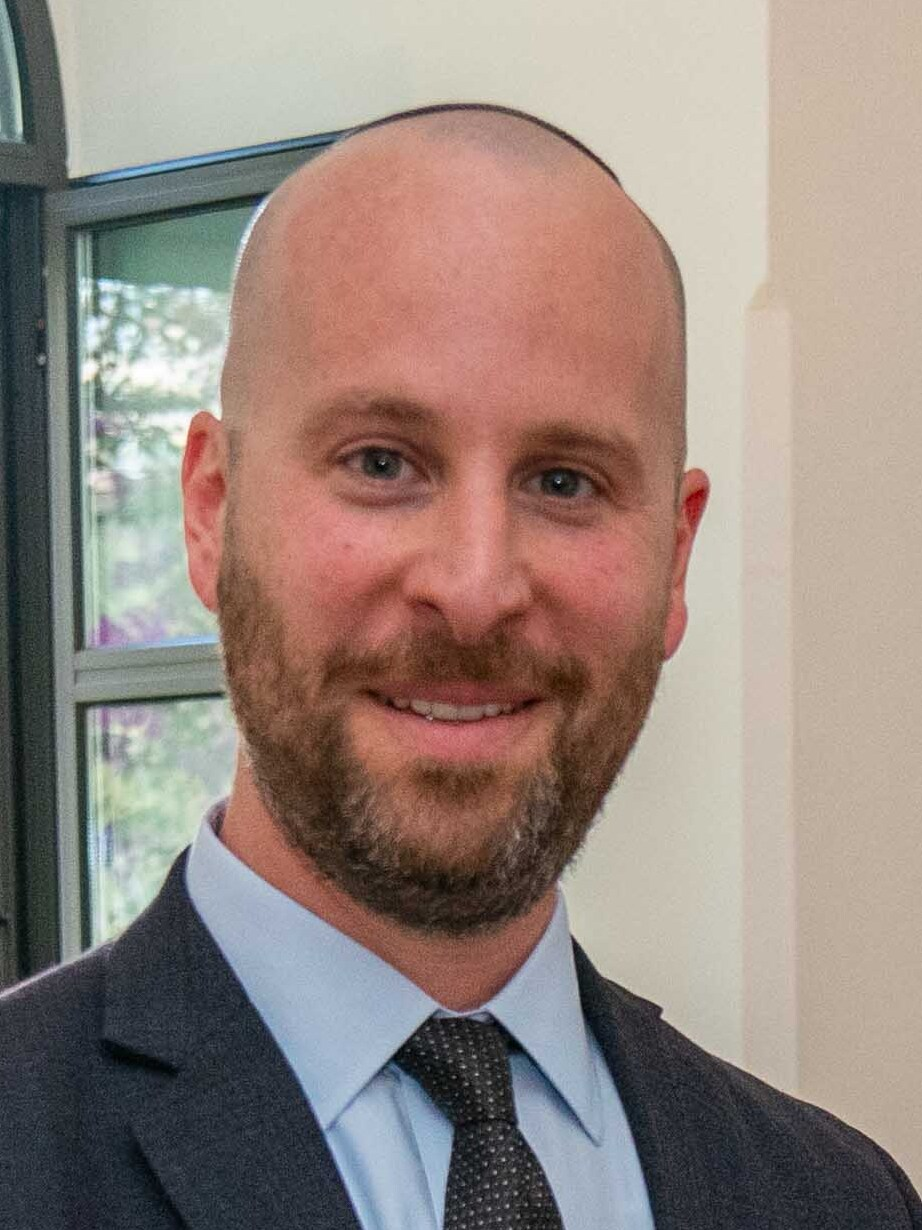
- Katz in 2019
- Born: 1979 (age 46–47)
- Education: Bar Ilan University
- Occupations: Journalist and author

Yaakov Katz (Hebrew: יעקב כץ; born 1979) is an American-born Israeli journalist, the author of four books on the Israel military, and the former Editor-in-Chief of The Jerusalem Post.

== Early life ==
Originally from Chicago, Katz moved to Israel in 1993. He completed a law degree from Bar-Ilan University in 2007, and in 2013 was selected as an outstanding alumnus.

== Career ==
From 2003 to 2013, Katz was the military correspondent and defense analyst for The Jerusalem Post, and has also worked as the Israel correspondent for Jane's Defence Weekly and USA Today. His writings have also appeared in the Washington Post, the New York Post, The Daily Beast, Al Jazeera English, Israel Defense, Newsmax, Special Operations Report, Fair Observer, and other publications.

In 2012-2013, Katz was one of 12 international fellows to spend a year at the Nieman Foundation for Journalism at Harvard.

In 2013, Katz became senior foreign policy advisor to Israel's Minister of Education and Diaspora Affairs Naftali Bennett.

He became Editor-in-Chief at The Jerusalem Post in 2016. In March 2023 he was replaced by Avi Mayer.

== Books ==
His first book, Israel vs. Iran: The Shadow War, which Katz co-authored with Yoaz Hendel, was published by Potomac Books in 2012 in the U.S., and by Kinneret Zmora-Bitan in Israel, where it spent several weeks on the best-seller list.

His second book, Weapons Wizards, written together with veteran Walla News military correspondent Amir Bohbot, was published by St. Martin's Press in 2017, and tells the behind-the-scenes story of how Israel invented its revolutionary weapons and military technology. It has been translated into Czech, Polish, Hebrew, and Mandarin.

His third book Shadow Strike: Inside Israel's Secret Mission to Eliminate Syrian Nuclear Power, was published in May 2019 by St. Martin's Press. It was chosen as a finalist for the Sami Rohr Prize for Jewish Literature.

His newest book, While Israel Slept: How Hamas Surprised the Most Powerful Military in the Middle East, is scheduled to be released on September 2, 2025.

Katz has lectured at dozens of college campuses across the U.S., and is a frequent speaker on issues relating to Israeli security and Middle East politics.

In 2023, after the October 7 Hamas attacks against Israel, Katz founded the Middle East America Dialogue, a high-level policy forum meant to foster a bi-partisan U.S. dialogue with allies in the Middle East, including Israel.

== Personal life ==
Katz lives in Jerusalem, and is married to Chaya Bina-Katz, who is the CEO of the Matan Women's Institute for Torah Studies. They have four children.

== Published works ==
- Israel vs. Iran: The Shadow War, with Yaoz Hendel (Zmora -Bitan Books, April 2011, Potomac Books 2012, ISBN 9781597976688) Google Books
- The Weapon Wizards: How Israel Became a High-Tech Military Superpower, with Amir Bohbot (St. Martin's Press, January 2017, ISBN 9781250088338)
- Shadow Strike: Inside Israel's Secret Mission to Eliminate Syrian Nuclear Power (St. Martin's Press, May 2019, ISBN 9781250191274)
- While Israel Slept: How Hamas Surprised the Most Powerful Military in the Middle East with Amir Bohbot (St. Martin's Press, September 2025, ISBN 9781250345684)
