= Samuel Rothberg =

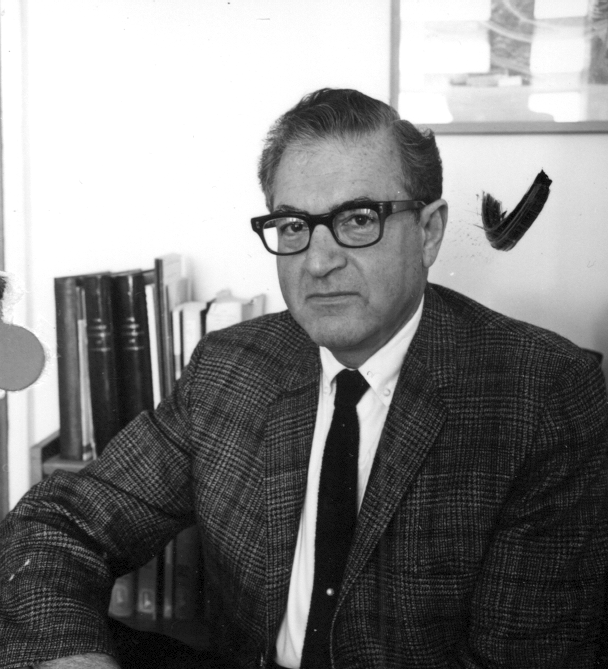
- Born: 1910; Belaya Tserkov, Russian Empire
- Died: August 14, 2007 (aged 96–97)
- Known for: Philanthropy

Samuel Rothberg (1910-2007) was a Jewish-American businessman and philanthropist. He was actively involved in the American Jewish community’s relationship with Israel.

== Biography ==
Samuel Rothberg was born in Bila Tserkva in the Russian Empire in 1910 to Bertha and Morris Rothberg. Together with his parents, he immigrated to the United States in 1913 and settled in Philadelphia, Pennsylvania. He graduated from the Philadelphia College of Pharmacy and Science in 1931 with degrees in bacteriology and microbiology. Subsequently, he worked at the American Commercial Alcohol Corporation doing research in fermentation and soon moved into senior management positions. He then moved to Peoria, Illinois and became the director of both the American Distilling Co. and the Parvin Dormeyer Co.

Rothberg married Jean Culver in 1941, and had four children: Heidi, Kathy, Michael, and Patrick.

He retired from business in 1975 and became more active in philanthropic endeavors, particularly in the Jewish communal world.

Samuel was awarded honorary doctoral degrees from Bradley University, The Hebrew University of Jerusalem, Brandeis University and the Hebrew Union College-Jewish Institute of Religion.

Rothberg died at the age of 97 on July 6, 2007, in Peoria, Illinois.

== Communal leadership and philanthropy ==
Rothberg was a philanthropist, community leader, and supporter of Israel. He traveled to Europe in 1947 and visited children orphaned during the Holocaust. Rothberg continued to support Jewish education initiatives in the United States and Israel, and supported the development of the State of Israel.

He was one of the founders of the Israel Bonds and worked on the National Water Carrier and the Jerusalem Economic Conference.

From 1968 to 1981, he served as Chairman of the International Board of Governors of the Hebrew University of Jerusalem. During this time, he helped return the university to its original location on Mount Scopus and helped establish new academic units. His major project, The Harry S. Truman Center for the Advancement of Peace, was one of the first buildings erected on Mount Scopus in Jerusalem following the Six-Day War of 1967. Organizers named the building for Truman in honor of his actions recognizing the new state of Israel only minutes after it declared independence in 1948.

Rothberg established The Hubert H. Humphrey Center for Cancer Research and Experimental Medicine. He also served as president of the American Friends of the Hebrew University. Together with Hebrew University President Avraham Harman, Rothberg was instrumental in establishing the Hebrew University's School for Overseas Students in 1971, which expanded the One Year Program that Rothberg started in 1955. In 1998, the Rothberg School inaugurated its own building, which was named The Rothberg International School.

In his later years, Rothberg developed glaucoma, and his personal experience led him to endow The Sam Rothberg Glaucoma Service and Research Center at the Goldschleger Eye Institute of the Sheba Medical Center in Israel. The center treats approximately 8,000 patients annually.

Rothberg was one of the founding donors of the United States Holocaust Memorial Museum in Washington, D.C., served on Bradley University's Board of Trustees from 1972 to 1983, and served as president of his synagogue, Agudas Achim.
