= Zvika Klein =

Israeli-American journalist (born 1982)

- צביקה קליין
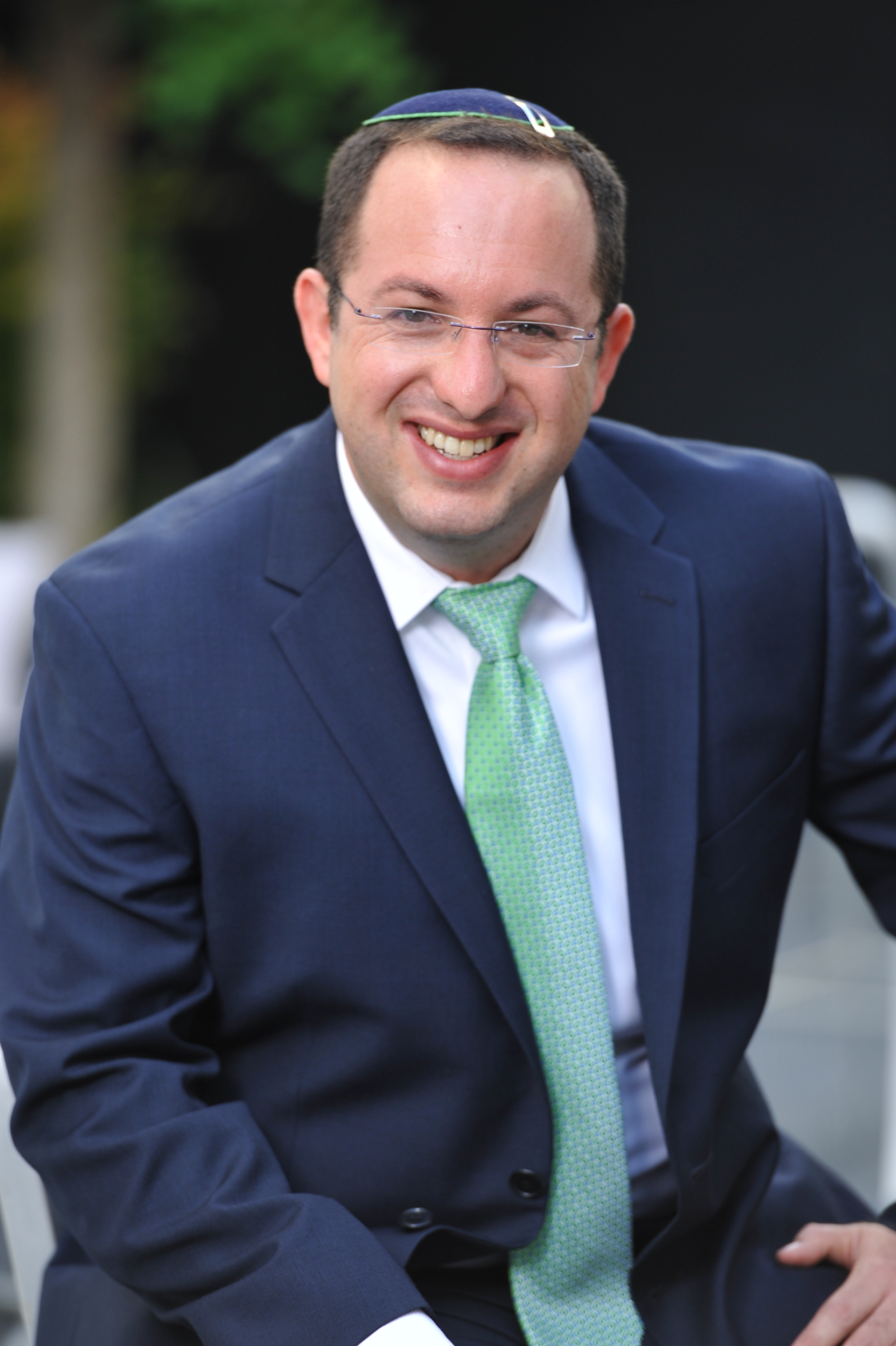
- Born: Zvi (Zvika) Michael Klein; December 13, 1982 (age 43); Chicago, Illinois, U.S.
- Citizenship: Israeli, American
- Occupation: Journalist
- Employer: The Jerusalem Post
- Known for: Coverage of Jewish diaspora affairs, diaspora-Israel relations
- Title: Editor-in-Chief of The Jerusalem Post

Zvika Klein (Hebrew: צביקה קליין born 1982) is an Israeli-American journalist. He is the editor-in-chief of The Jerusalem Post since December 2023. Previously, he worked as a correspondent and commentator focusing on Jewish diaspora affairs and Israel-diaspora relations and as an advisor to the President of Israel.

== Early life and education ==
Klein was born in Chicago, Illinois, to an American Jewish family. In 1985, his family immigrated to Israel. He later earned a bachelor’s degree in social sciences and humanities from the Open University of Israel.

== Career ==
Between 2005 and 2006, Klein spent time as an emissary on behalf of Bnei Akiva in South Florida.

From 2006 to 2009, he served as a project manager at the World Zionist Organization, focusing on educational emissaries around the world.

From 2006 to 2011, Klein acted as Bnei Akiva's spokesperson.

Klein joined the Makor Rishon paper in 2011, and wrote for it until 2022. He wrote for Maariv between 2012-2014. During this time he covered the Jewish diaspora, immigration, and the relationship between Israel and Jewish communities worldwide for Israeli outlets.

In 2015, Klein walked around Paris with a Kippah (Jewish skullcap) and a hidden camera for 10 hours, in order to see whether reports of increased antisemitism in the city were justified or not. The short video of this walk was watched millions of times, and according to The Washington Post, it "shows him being stared at, spit upon, insulted and otherwise harassed, primarily by people who appear to be part of France’s Muslim minority."

Between 2020 and 2022, Klein served as an advisor on diaspora affairs to the office of the President of Israel.

In August 2023, Klein was named Editor-in-Chief of the Jerusalem Post, replacing Avi Mayer.

== Awards and recognition ==
- 2009 B'nai B'rith Award for Journalism
- In 2016 The Algemeiner Journal named Klein as one of the '100 most influential Jews'
- 2019 B'nai B'rith Award for Journalism

== Controversies ==
In 2025, Klein was asked for questioning in the ongoing 'Qatargate' case in Israel, which involved suspicions of people close to Prime Minister Benjamin Netanyahu aiding Qatar, a country with which Israel does not have diplomatic relations. The routine questioning made headlines when Klein's phone was taken without a warrant and the journalist detained without any apparent cause. Politicians called for the investigation of those who took such actions against the editor of a significant paper.

== Personal life ==
Klein is married to Avital Tekel-Klein. They live in Efrat and have three children.
