= Brutakhi =

Early 13 century Jewish polity of uncertain location and origin

The Brutakhi were a Jewish polity of uncertain location and origin during the early 13th century.

== History ==
Giovanni da Pian del Carpine, a 13th-century papal legate to the court of the Mongol Khan Guyuk, gave a list of the nations the Mongols had conquered in his account. One of them, listed among tribes of the Caucasus, Pontic steppe and the Caspian region, was the "Brutakhi, who are Jews." Nikolay Karamzin pointed to the fact that Carpine meant Burtas by Brutaches.

Some translations read "Comani Brutakhi", (Comani Brutachi, qui sunt Iudii) which seems to indicate an alignment with the Cumans-Kipchaks; however, this reading has been challenged by many historians who have asserted that there should be a comma between the Comani and Brutakhi. However, earlier in the same list Giovanni refers to "Comania", leading some to regard the postulated comma as redundant and therefore highly suspect.

== Unclear Identity ==
The identity of the Brutakhi is unclear. Giovanni later relates that the Brutakhi shave their heads, a common Turkic custom. Some historians have theorized that the Brutakhi may have been a remnant of the Khazar people, or a result of some sort of missionary efforts. Alternatively, they may have been Cuman-Kipchak converts to Judaism (possibly connected to the Krymchaks or the Karaims). Another possibility is that the Brutakhi are connected to the Mountain Jews of Daghestan, who are believed to have ruled independent states at points in their history. Some scholars have speculated that "Brutakhi" may be a corruption of "Brutas" or "Burtas", a steppe tribe of uncertain ethnic affiliation mentioned by other medieval sources.
