= The Jerusalem Post =

English-language Israeli newspaper

- Front page of The Jerusalem Post; September 1, 2020
- Type: Daily newspaper
- Format: Broadsheet
- Owner: The Jerusalem Post Group
- Editor: Zvika Klein
- Founded: 1 December 1932; 93 years ago (as The Palestine Post)
- Political alignment: Center-right; Conservative
- Language: English
- Headquarters: Jerusalem
- Country: Israel
- Circulation: 90,000 (Weekends: 120,000) (International: 50,000)
- Sister newspapers: Jerusalem Post Lite; Maariv; Walla!
- ISSN: 0792-822X
- OCLC number: 15700704
- Website: jpost.com

The Jerusalem Post is an English-language Israeli broadsheet newspaper based in Jerusalem. It was founded in 1932 during the British Mandate of Palestine by Gershon Agron as The Palestine Post. In 1950, it changed its name to The Jerusalem Post. In 2004, the paper was bought by Mirkaei Tikshoret, a diversified Israeli media firm controlled by investor Eli Azur (who in 2014 also acquired the newspaper Maariv). The Jerusalem Post is published in English. Previously, it also had a French edition.

The paper describes itself as being in the Israeli political center, but widely seen as center-right in Israel; its editorial line is critical of political corruption, and supportive of the separation of religion and state in Israel. It is also a strong proponent of greater investment by the State of Israel in World Jewry and educational programs for the Jewish diaspora.

The broadsheet newspaper is published daily Sunday to Friday, except for Jewish religious holidays and Independence Day, with no edition appearing on Saturday (the Jewish Sabbath). Regular opinion columnists write on subjects such as religion, foreign affairs and economics.

== History ==
The first attempt to establish an English-language newspaper in Jerusalem was The Jerusalem News, established in 1919 under the auspices of the Christian Science movement, but this had no relationship to The Jerusalem Post.

=== The Palestine Bulletin, 1925–1932 ===
The direct journalistic ancestry of The Jerusalem Post can be traced to The Palestine Bulletin, which was founded in January 1925 by Jacob Landau of the Jewish Telegraphic Agency (JTA). It was owned by the Palestine Telegraphic Agency, which was in practice part of the JTA even though it was legally separate.

On 1 November 1931, editorship of the Bulletin was taken over by Gershon Agronsky (later Agron), a Jewish journalist who had immigrated to Palestine from the United States. In March 1932, a dispute arose between Landau and Agronsky, which Agronsky resolved to settle by establishing an independent newspaper. Landau and Agronsky instead came to an agreement to transform the Bulletin into a new, jointly owned newspaper. Accordingly, the Palestine Bulletin published its last issue on 30 November 1932.

=== The Palestine Post, 1932–1950 ===
The Palestine Post Incorporating The Palestine Bulletin appeared the following day, 1 December 1932. On 25 April 1933, the masthead was reduced to just The Palestine Post although its founding year still appeared as 1925. It appeared on 24 August 1934 but not in the following issue, 26 August, or later.

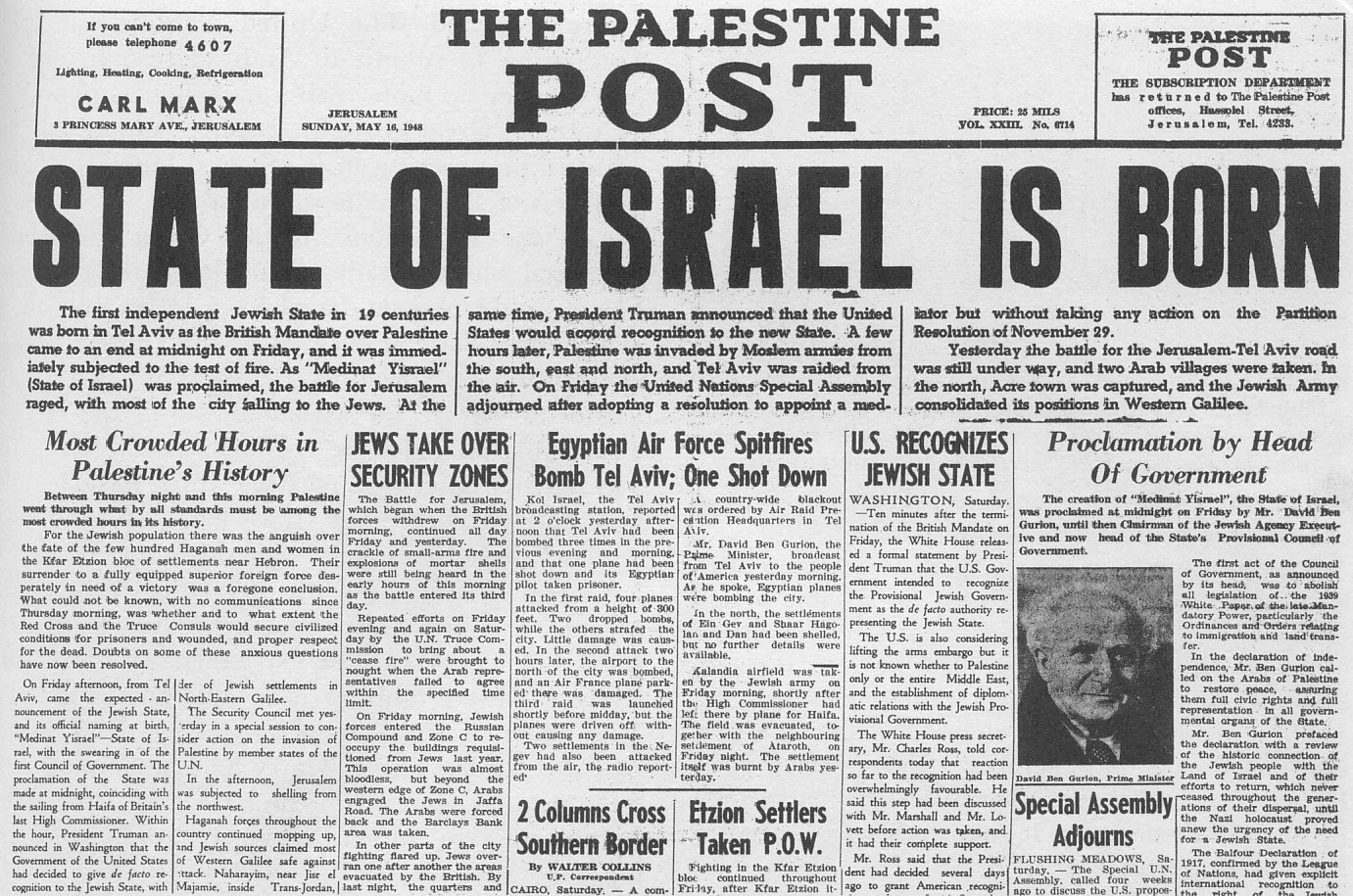
16 May 1948 edition of The Palestine Post

During its time as The Palestine Post, the publication supported the struggle for a Jewish homeland in Palestine and openly opposed British policy restricting Jewish immigration during the Mandate period. According to one commentator, "Zionist institutions considered the newspaper one of the most effective means of exerting influence on the British authorities".

==== 1948 bombing ====
On the evening of 1 February 1948, a stolen British police car loaded with half a ton of TNT pulled up in front of the Jerusalem office of the Palestine Post on Solel Street (now Hahavazelet). The driver of a second car arrived a few minutes later, lit the fuse and drove off. The building also contained other newspaper offices, the British press censor, the Jewish settlement police, and a Haganah post with a cache of weapons. Arab leader Abd al-Qadir al-Husayni claimed responsibility for the bombing, but historian Uri Milstein reported that the bomb had been prepared by the Nazi-trained Fawzi el-Kutub, known as "the engineer", with the involvement of two British army deserters, Cpl. Peter Mersden and Capt. Eddie Brown. Four people were killed in the bombing, including three Post employees. According to the Palestine Post at the time, a newspaper typesetter and two people who lived in a nearby block of flats died. Dozens of others were injured and the printing press was destroyed. The morning paper came out in a reduced format of two pages, printed at a small print shop nearby.

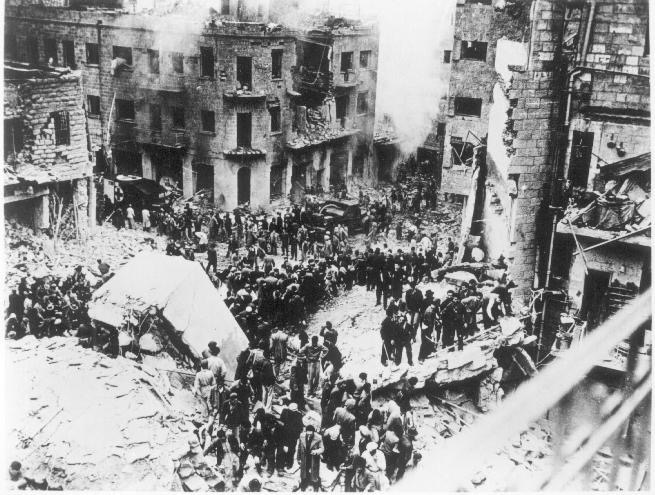
Palestine Post offices after car bomb attack, 1 February 1948, Jerusalem

=== The Jerusalem Post ===
==== Labor movement, 1950–1989 ====
In 1950, two years after the State of Israel was declared, the paper was renamed The Jerusalem Post. Until 1989, the paper supported the Labor Party.

==== Black's Hollinger, 1989–2004 ====
In 1989, the paper was purchased by Hollinger Inc., owned by Conrad Black. A number of journalists resigned from the Post after Black's takeover and founded The Jerusalem Report, a weekly magazine eventually sold to the Post. After the acquisition, the Jerusalem Post underwent a noticeable shift to the political right.

Under editor-in-chief David Makovsky, from 1999 to 2000, the paper took a centrist position on defense, but began to reject socialism. In 2002, Hollinger hired the politically conservative Bret Stephens of The Wall Street Journal as editor-in-chief. David Horovitz took over as editor-in-chief on 1 October 2004. From 2004 onward, Horovitz moved the paper to the center.

==== Azur's Mirkaei Tikshoret ====
On 16 November 2004, Hollinger sold the paper to Mirkaei Tikshoret Limited, a Tel Aviv-based publisher of Israeli newspapers owned by Eli Azur. CanWest Global Communications, Canada's biggest media concern, had announced an agreement to take a 50 percent stake in The Jerusalem Post after Mirkaei bought the property, but the deal soured. The two sides went to arbitration, and CanWest lost.

In 2011, Horovitz was succeeded by the paper's managing editor, Steve Linde, who pledged to provide balanced coverage of the news along with views from across the political spectrum. Linde professed to maintain political moderation. Yaakov Katz, the paper's former military analyst, former adviser to former Prime Minister Naftali Bennett, and a fellow at the Nieman Foundation for Journalism, succeeded Linde in April 2016.

In January 2008, the paper announced a new partnership with The Wall Street Journal, including joint marketing and exclusive publication in Israel of The Wall Street Journal Europe.

Since 2012, the newspaper has held an annual conference in New York, The Jerusalem Post Conference, with the participation of senior figures in the Israeli government and the Jewish world. The conference was founded by media entrepreneur Ronen Lefler and Linde, and is currently managed by the CEO of the Jerusalem Post Group, Inbar Ashkenazi.

In 2020, the Israeli online newspaper +972 Magazine published a three-year investigation revealing that the Israeli Ministry of Strategic Affairs had paid large sums to The Jerusalem Post to publish content against human rights movements, including a screening of a documentary produced by the ministry that sought to discredit the BDS movement.

In 2020, Reuters reported that The Jerusalem Post, along with Algemeiner, The Times of Israel and Arutz Sheva, had published op-eds written by non-existent people. In 2020, The Daily Beast identified a network of false personas used to sneak opinion pieces aligned with UAE government policy to media outlets such as The Jerusalem Post. Twitter suspended some of the accounts of these fake persons on its own platform.

In January 2022, The Jerusalem Post's website was hacked by pro-Iranian actors. The JPost.com website homepage was replaced with an image depicting a bullet shot from a red ring on a finger (likely in reference to the ring worn by the Iranian General Qasem Soleimani) and the caption "we are close to you where you do not think about it". The hack occurred on the second anniversary of the Assassination of Qasem Soleimani and is largely seen as a threat towards Israel.

In March 2023, Katz stepped down as editor-in-chief and was replaced by Avi Mayer. Nine months later, Mayer was replaced by Zvika Klein.

In early December 2023, during the Gaza war, The Jerusalem Post published an article falsely claiming that a dead 5-month-old Palestinian baby from Gaza was a doll. The Jerusalem Post later retracted the report with a statement on X, saying, "The article in question did not meet our editorial standards and was thus removed". The false claim was also promoted by others such as Israel's official Twitter account, Ben Shapiro, Hen Mazzig, Yoseph Haddad and StopAntisemitism.

== Products and services ==
=== Influencer lists ===
The Jerusalem Post has been publishing an annual list of the world's "50 most influential Jews" since 2010. The list is released on Rosh Hashanah. In 2023, The Jerusalem Post announced the launch of a "50 most influential Jews" congress, including an awards ceremony for the honorees.

=== Magazines ===
The Jerusalem Post also publishes a monthly magazine, IVRIT, edited by Sarit Yalov. Its target audience is people learning the Hebrew language and it is described as "an easy-Hebrew" publication, meant for improving basic Hebrew reading skills. It uses the vowel notation system to make comprehension of the Hebrew abjad simpler. The Jerusalem Report, now edited by Steve Linde, is a fortnightly print and online glossy newsmagazine.

=== JPost.com ===
JPost.com was launched in December 1996. Its current version also contains an ePaper version of the daily newspaper, a range of magazines and other web versions of the Group's products.

The site is an entity separate from the daily newspaper. While sharing reporters, it is managed by different teams. Its staff is based in Tel Aviv, while the newspaper offices are located in Jerusalem.

The site contains archives that go back to 1989, and the default search on the site sends users to archive listings, powered by ProQuest, where articles can be purchased. Free blurbs of the article are available as well, and full articles are available when linked to directly from navigation within JPost.com or from a search engine.

JPost.com includes the "Premium Zone", a pay-wall protected area, containing additional Jerusalem Post articles and special features. The site, which was given a graphic facelift in September 2014, recently relaunched its mobile and tablet applications, as well as its special edition for mobile viewing.

=== Jerusalem Post Lite ===
The Jerusalem Post Lite is an Israeli weekly easy-English newspaper/magazine for improving English. It was founded on 16 July 2009 by Jerusalem Post Group CEO Ronit Hassin Hochman. The weekly readership numbers are in the tens of thousands. It was created to answer an increasing demand in Israel for ESL (English as Second Language) studies on one's free time, as opposed to a school, university or other limited courses.

The Jerusalem Post Lite has 32 pages, three of which are dedicated to advertisement. Readers receive a weekly newspaper format with various subjects, from hard news to light easy-reading articles. On each page there is a dictionary that translates specific words by context, and not literally, into Hebrew and into phonetic pronunciation. There are three levels of English in the Jerusalem Post Lite, and each article ranked in difficulty with one, two or three stars. On the last pages there are English exercises and crosswords. Content was initially taken from the Jerusalem Post daily newspaper. When Nimrod Ganzarski became editor-in-chief, he expanded the paper's scope to take from other Jerusalem Post Group publications as well as original material.

== Editors ==
- Gershon Agron (1932–1955)
- Ted Lurie (1955–1974)
- Lea Ben Dor (1974–1975)
- Ari Rath and Erwin Frenkel (1975–1989)
- N. David Gross (1990–1992)
- David Bar-Illan (1992–1996)
- Jeff Barak (1996–1999)
- David Makovsky (1999–2000)
- Carl Schrag (2000)
- Jeff Barak (2000–2002)
- Bret Stephens (2002–2004)
- David Horovitz (2004–2011)
- Steve Linde (2011–2016)
- Yaakov Katz (2016–2023)
- Avi Mayer (2023)
- Zvika Klein (2023-)

== Agron family ==
Gershon Agron founded the newspaper and served as its editor until he went into public service. One of his early reporters was his nephew Martin Agronsky, who later became a famous American political journalist. Agronsky left the paper after only a year. He felt he had been hired out of nepotism and didn't like this, wanting to earn his jobs.

Agron's son Dani Agron worked for the newspaper, serving as its business manager in the 1970s, while his wife Ethel wrote for Hadassah Magazine. Martin Agronsky's son Jonathan Agronsky became a journalist in the United States.

== See also ==
- List of newspapers in Israel

== Sources ==
- Ellis, Peter Berresford (1984). The Last Adventurer: The Life of Talbot Mundy. West Kingston: Donald M. Grant. ISBN 0-937986-70-4.
- Taves, Brian (2006). Talbot Mundy, Philosopher of Adventure: A Critical Biography. Jefferson, North Carolina: McFarland and Company. ISBN 0-7864-2234-3.
