= Steven Kaplan (Africanist) =

American academic

Steven Kaplan (born October 5, 1953, in New York) is an Israeli-American scholar of Ethiopian Studies. Until his retirement, he served as Professor of African Studies and Comparative Religion at the Hebrew University of Jerusalem. His research focuses on the religious and social history of Ethiopia, with particular attention to so-called heretical movements and their relationship to Ethiopian Orthodoxy. Kaplan is widely regarded as one of the world’s leading experts on the Beta Israel community and has published extensively on their history in Ethiopia as well as on their integration into Israeli society.

Kaplan began his academic career studying Judaic and Middle Eastern Studies at Brandeis University, where he earned both a Bachelor of Arts (B.A.) and a Master of Arts (M.A.) in 1975. He continued his studies at Harvard Divinity School, receiving a Master of Theological Studies (M.T.S.) in Comparative Religion in 1977. In 1982, he received his Ph.D. from the Hebrew University of Jerusalem. From 1984 onward, he taught at the Hebrew University—initially as a Lecturer, then as a Senior Lecturer from 1989, as an Associate Professor from 1992, and finally as a Full Professor until his retirement in 2004.

Between 1990 and 2002, Kaplan served as Chair of the Department of African Studies at the Hebrew University, and from 1998 to 2001, he also chaired the Institute of Asian and African Studies. During this period, he held several other administrative roles, including Chair of the Credentials Committee of the Authority for Research Students (1994–2000) and Academic Director of the Graduate Studies Program at the Rothberg International School (1994–1996). In 1992–1993, he served as Acting Director of the One-Year Study Program at the Rothberg International School. In the spring of 2002, Kaplan briefly held the position of Assistant Dean of the Faculty of Humanities, and from 2002 to 2003, he chaired the Academic Committee of the Interfaculty Program in Cultural Studies. Between 2002 and 2004, he served as Provost of the Rothberg International School. From 2004 to 2006, he was Dean of the Faculty of Humanities.

Kaplan has held visiting appointments at numerous prestigious academic institutions, including the School of Oriental and African Studies (SOAS) at the University of London, the Radcliffe Institute at Harvard University, the African Studies Center at Boston University, and the Department of Religious Studies at the University of North Carolina at Chapel Hill. In the summer term of 2004, he held the Hiob Ludolf Guest Professorship at the University of Hamburg. He has also been involved in several major academic projects, serving as an advisor to the Diaspora Museum in Tel Aviv and as a subject specialist for the Encyclopaedia Aethiopica. In addition, he collaborated with Israel’s Ministry of Immigrant Absorption.

Among his most important publications is his 1992 monograph The Beta Israel (Falasha) in Ethiopia, which is considered a seminal work on the history of the Beta Israel prior to their conversion to normative Judaism in the early 20th century.

Kaplan is married and the father of three children.

== Publications ==
Steven Kaplan has published hundreds of articles and several monographs over the course of his academic career, many of which have been recognized as seminal contributions to Ethiopian Studies. The following is a selection of his edited volumes and monographs.

Editorial Works

- (With Siegbert Uhlig, David Appleyard, Alessandro Bausi, Wolfgang Hahn): Äthiopien: Geschichte, Kultur, Herausforderungen, Wiesbaden 2018.
- (With Kay Kaufman Shelemay): Creating the Ethiopian Diaspora: Perspectives from Across the Disciplines (Special Issue: Diaspora, Journal of Transnational Studies, vol. 15, nos. 2/3), Toronto 2006.
- (With Verena Böll, Andreu Martinez, Ezhenia Sokolinskaia): Ethiopia and the Missions: Historical and Anthropological Insights, Berlin et al., 2005.
- Indigenous Responses to Western Christianity, New York 1995.
- (With Tudor Parfitt, Emanuela Trevisan Semi): Between Africa and Zion: Proceedings of the First International Congress of the Society for the Study of Ethiopian Jewry, Jerusalem 1995.
- Between Africa and Zion, Jerusalem 1995.

Monographs

- (With Haggai Erlich, Hagar Salamon): Ethiopia: Christianity, Islam, Judaism, Tel Aviv 2003.
- (With Hagar Salamon): Ethiopian Immigrants in Israel: Experience and Prospects, London 1998.
- The Beta Israel (Falasha) in Ethiopia: From Earliest Times to the Twentieth Century, New York 1992.
- The Monastic Holy Man and the Christianization of Early Solomonic Ethiopia, Wiesbaden 1984.
