= Karina Shtotland =

Israeli journalist and magazine editor

- קרינה שטוטלנד
- Born: Kyiv, Ukrainian SSR, Soviet Union
- Education: Tel Aviv University (LLB)
- Occupations: Journalist, editor
- Years active: 1990s–present
- Employer: Yedioth Ahronoth Group
- Title: Editor-in-chief of La'Isha
- Term: 2014–present
- Predecessor: Orna Nenner
- Awards: Sokolov Award (2021)

Karina Shtotland (born February 24, 1977; Hebrew: קרינה שטוטלנד) is an Israeli journalist and editor. Since 2014 she has been editor-in-chief of La'Isha, a weekly women's magazine published by the Yedioth Ahronoth group. She previously edited the newspaper's lifestyle supplement Zmanim Moderniyim. In 2021 she received the Sokolov Award for print journalism.

== Early life and education ==
Shtotland was born in Kyiv, then part of the Soviet Union, and immigrated to Israel with her family as a young child. After a period at an immigrant absorption center in Atlit, the family settled in Beersheba, where she grew up. She began writing for newspapers at the age of 12, reporting for a local Beersheba weekly and later for youth magazines. During her military service she was a reporter for the Israel Defense Forces weekly Bamahane.

She studied law at Tel Aviv University, continuing to work as a writer and editor during her studies. She completed her legal internship at the Israel Money Laundering Prohibition Authority of the Ministry of Justice and was admitted to the bar, but returned to journalism rather than practising law.

In 2000 she co-wrote, with Ayelet Baram, Ha-Hayim Be-Yarok ("Life in Green"), a guide for young women entering military service, published by Keter.

== Career ==
=== Early editing roles ===
Before joining Yedioth Ahronoth, Shtotland worked as an editor at the women's magazine At, as a writer for Firma, a magazine published by the business daily Globes, and as an editor at the magazine Go. She joined Yedioth Ahronoth in about 2005 as an editor of the daily supplement 24 Sha'ot and later became deputy editor of the weekend supplement 7 Leilot.

In March 2008, at the age of 31, she was appointed editor of Zmanim Moderniyim ("Modern Times"), Yedioth Ahronoth's lifestyle supplement, succeeding Miriam Kotz, who had edited it for 11 years. She held the post for about six years.

=== Editor of La'Isha ===
In 2014 Shtotland succeeded Orna Nenner, who had edited La'Isha for 15 years, as the magazine's editor-in-chief. In a 2021 interview she described an editorial approach combining fashion, beauty, health and relationships with careers and social issues, and said that she saw no contradiction between feminism and an interest in fashion. The interviewer cited projects from her tenure including one on involved fatherhood and the balance between work and family.

In a 2019 column she described meetings with the magazine's subscription department, at which some subscribers asked the magazine to publish only uplifting material, and argued that alongside lifestyle content it also had a responsibility to report on violence against women.

==== Editorial initiatives ====
In March 2016, ahead of International Women's Day, La'Isha published "You Will Not Rape Us into Silence", an issue whose cover showed 22 women – the number of letters in the Hebrew alphabet – who were identified by name and described rape or other serious sexual assaults they had experienced; the interviews were conducted by reporter Sharon Rofe-Ofir. In a column on the project, Shtotland wrote that it was inspired by a July 2015 New York magazine cover featuring 35 women who had accused Bill Cosby of sexual assault, which she had kept on her desk for months. She described how the team initially hoped to find ten women willing to be identified, how participants were allowed to withdraw even after being interviewed or photographed, and how an empty chair on the cover represented women not yet ready to speak publicly.

In October 2017 she announced that the magazine would address its readers in the feminine plural, which in Hebrew differs grammatically from the masculine plural traditionally used for mixed or general audiences. She said that the food and children's sections would continue to use inclusive forms so as not to imply that cooking and childcare were women's responsibilities alone, and that interviewees' words would not be altered.

The magazine also published a cover of Eylon Nuphar, a co-founder of the organisation Miumana, showing her after a double mastectomy without breast reconstruction. On 21 November 2021, ahead of the International Day for the Elimination of Violence Against Women, La'Isha appeared for the first time with an all-black cover carrying only the number of a domestic violence helpline. In an accompanying column, Shtotland wrote that copies of the magazine are passed between readers and kept for years, so that more women would encounter the number over time. The cover received a Merit at The One Show in 2022, with Shtotland credited as editor. In November 2022 the magazine published its first cover addressed to men who use violence, directing them to a men's helpline operated by WIZO.

In November 2025 the magazine began printing the helpline number permanently on the spine of every issue, in a project called *6724EVER developed with Gideon Amichay's creative agency. Shtotland was quoted in the advertising press as saying that the aim was not momentary attention but a commitment that the helpline would appear every week permanently. The project won two bronze Clio Awards in 2026.

==== Reception ====
Communication scholar Einat Lachover, analysing La'Isha during the first year of the Gaza war, found that the magazine integrated war and bereavement stories into its lifestyle content and adopted patriotic framing; she argued that its coverage largely avoided institutional criticism and retreated from the feminist perspective that had characterised it previously. In December 2018 the hosts of a radio programme on 103FM criticised the magazine for devoting a cover story to a haircut of actress Rotem Sela.

Shtotland was among those interviewed for the 2026 documentary The Secrets of La'Isha, about the magazine's history.

=== Labour court case ===
In January 2016 journalist Gafi Amir, who had written a regular column for La'Isha since 2010, filed a claim in the regional labour court against Yedioth Ahronoth and Shtotland, alleging that she had been dismissed in 2015 in breach of the newspaper's collective agreements, without a proper hearing and for improper reasons. In December 2018 the Tel Aviv Labour Court dismissed the claim and ordered Amir to pay legal costs.

== Sokolov Award ==
In June 2021 Shtotland was named, together with Gideon Levy, as a recipient of the Sokolov Award for print journalism. The jury cited her expansion of La'Isha's coverage to the barriers affecting women's integration and advancement in Israeli society and in the home. According to Ynet and to a profile published by Tel Aviv University's law faculty, she was the first editor of a women's magazine to receive the award since its establishment in 1956; the faculty profile described her as the 19th woman to receive it. Each recipient received 18,000 shekels.

At the ceremony in November 2021 she described the award as recognition of women's journalism. According to the media-criticism website The Seventh Eye, she noted in her speech that fewer than 20 women had received the prize compared with more than 100 men, dedicated it to Israeli women journalists and asked the women journalists in the audience to stand.

== Other activities ==
Shtotland served on the jury of the Rappaport Prize for women generating change in 2016 and 2017, and in 2025 on the jury of the Sokolov Award for electronic media. She also writes features; in 2026 Ynetnews published her article on an initiative by secular, Haredi and Bedouin women for gender parity in Israeli politics.

== Works ==
- Ayelet Baram and Karina Shtotland, Ha-Hayim Be-Yarok: Ha-Madrikh Ha-Mahtarti La-Mitgayeset Ve-La-Hayelet (Life in Green: The Underground Guide for the Female Recruit and Soldier), Keter, 2000.
