= LaIsha =

Israeli weekly women's magazine

La'Isha
- Editor-in-chief: Karina Shtotland
- Categories: Women's magazine
- Frequency: Weekly
- First issue: January 1947; 79 years ago
- Company: Yedioth Ahronoth Group
- Country: Israel
- Based in: Rishon LeZion
- Language: Hebrew
- Website: www.ynet.co.il/laisha

La'Isha (Hebrew: לאשה, literally "For the Woman") is an Israeli women's magazine published weekly in Hebrew by the Yedioth Ahronoth media group. Founded in January 1947 as a supplement to the group's newspaper, it became a separately sold magazine in July that year. Communication scholar Einat Lachover has described it as the country's most popular and longest-running privately owned commercial women's magazine.

The magazine combines service journalism on fashion, beauty, food, health, family life and consumer affairs with interviews, personal narratives and reporting on social issues. Researchers including Sonia Leiden, Moran Pollack and Einat Lachover have examined its changing representations of domesticity, paid employment and women's participation in public life, and the relationship between its commercial identity and its civic role.

Its public initiatives include the Miss Israel pageant, held under its auspices from 1950 to 2021, and projects addressing sexual and domestic violence. A permanent redesign displaying a domestic violence helpline on every issue's spine received international advertising awards in 2026. Karina Shtotland has been editor-in-chief since 2014.

== History ==
=== Foundation and early years ===
The first issue appeared in January 1947 in Mandatory Palestine as Yedioth Ahronoth – La'Isha, a four-page weekly supplement sold with Yedioth Ahronoth. A retrospective published by the magazine in 2004 reported an initial print run of 200 copies and a price of 20 Palestine mils. The opening editorial promised practical information about household management, family budgets, nutrition, childcare, sewing, fashion, health and beauty, alongside discussion of women's participation in public and cultural life. On 23 July 1947, it became a separately sold publication, subtitled "a popular weekly for the home and family". The editorial of that issue stated that the magazine would reflect the particular roles and problems of women in the Hebrew-speaking public. Early editorials mixed practical advice with views on readers' way of life: one in 1948 advised women in small apartments not to pursue cleanliness at the expense of their peace of mind, and another that year warned readers against submitting to the dictates of Paris fashion.

The founder and first editor-in-charge was lawyer Hemda Nofekh-Mozes, who remained associated with the magazine until her death in 1989. Her legal-advice column, Bisvakh Hamishpat ("In the Tangle of the Law"), addressed legal and social questions affecting readers. Day-to-day editing was initially undertaken by Aharon Shamir, who served until 1952, followed by David Krasik, who remained editor until 1979.

Early departments covered mothers and children, dressmaking patterns, beauty, children's health and cooking, together with interviews and personal stories. A retrospective published for the 4,000th issue also mentioned the features "Figure of the Week" and "These Women", a knitting column and children's photography contests. The advice column Tevat Do'ar ("Mailbox"), established in January 1947, offered confidential responses from a lawyer, educator, physician and experienced woman. Questions about children, relationships and sexuality helped establish the magazine as a source of personal guidance.

Historian Sharon Geva found that its 1950s coverage gave unusual prominence to individual women Holocaust survivors. Interviews and first-person accounts identified the women by name and included their photographs, treating the Holocaust as part of an individual biography rather than primarily as a political controversy or collective narrative. This approach nevertheless frequently framed survivors through motherhood, family life and victimhood. The magazine gave extensive coverage to Rina Weiss, a survivor of Bergen-Belsen who represented Israel at the Miss World contest in 1956, and published her first-person account of the camp that year. In 1961 it ran a series titled "The Women behind the Eichmann Trial", including an interview with Yehudit Hausner, wife of the prosecutor Gideon Hausner, and at the end of the trial it conducted a street poll of women only.

During the 1950s, La'Isha was Israel's principal commercial women's paper. Would-be competitors such as Hava, La'Isha ve-la'Ofna (first issue January 1955) and Olam ha-Isha ha-Tse'ira (April 1956) were short-lived, some closing after a single issue. In December 1952, Davar HaPoelet, the women workers' journal, published a critique of the magazine's emphasis on body care.

=== Early statehood and social change ===
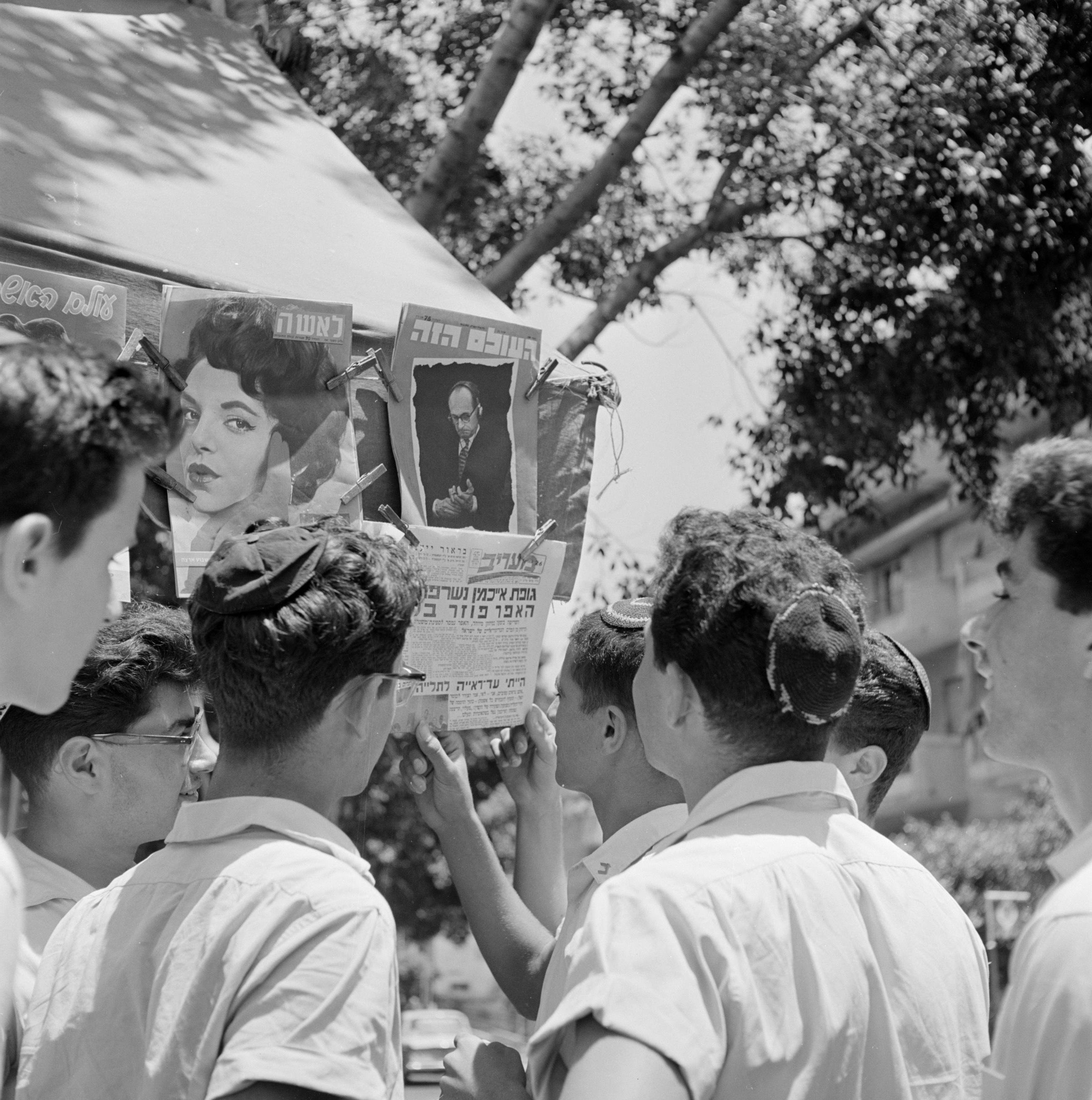
La'Isha at a newspaper kiosk in Tel Aviv, 1964.

During Israel's early years, the magazine addressed everyday life under austerity, family, health, employment and consumption. It also promoted public initiatives associated with constructing an Israeli female identity, including Miss Israel, a national homemaker competition and the introduction of Mother's Day into Israeli public life. The first Miss Israel competition took place in 1950, following Nofekh-Mozes's initiative.

During the Six-Day War, La'Isha encouraged readers to contribute to the war effort. The delayed 1967 beauty pageant, ultimately held in Jerusalem, was presented as part of the celebration of victory.

In the early 1970s, it sympathetically covered poverty, housing shortages and discrimination against female factory workers, sometimes criticising government policy. Although it did not cover the militant demonstrations of the Israeli Black Panthers, it supported their objectives and included women associated with the movement among its "women of the year"; the 1971 list was headed by "the Israeli woman struggling with economic hardship". Its coverage largely overlooked the protest's Mizrahi ethnic dimension. A later study contrasted this reporting with its much narrower coverage of the 2011 Israeli social justice protests.

Studies of the 1970s found that domesticity and motherhood remained dominant ideals, alongside emerging representations of independent and critical women. An analysis of articles published between 1967 and 1977 found that the magazine encouraged paid employment for women, including mothers, while presenting several competing understandings of women's work and the division of responsibilities within families.

=== From the 1980s onward ===
Zvi Elgat succeeded Krasik in 1979 and edited the magazine until 1996. An obituary published by Ynet in 2008 stated that under his editorship the magazine reached unprecedented circulation and became the most widely distributed weekly in Israel. According to Geva, by the late 1980s it had about 600,000 readers and was the most widely read weekly in the country. Coverage expanded to careers, education, relationships, health, consumer affairs, culture and leisure, while fashion, food and family remained central. A retrospective of milestone issues documented the combination of celebrity and entertainment coverage with articles about women in management, domestic violence and an illustrated self-defence course.

Elgat described his guiding editorial principle as choosing material that would engage the curiosity of readers of different ages. Journalist Irit Brenner, who joined the staff in 1993, later recalled his mentoring in writing concise personal columns.

In the late 1980s, the entertainment weekly Pnai Plus began as a supplement to La'Isha before becoming a separate magazine within the Yedioth Ahronoth group.

In August 1996, Iris Zohar-Pinhasi became the first woman to oversee the magazine's daily editing, serving until 1999. During her tenure, the relationship between advertising and editorial content attracted criticism. In 1997, the media journal The Seventh Eye criticised the integration of products and advertisers into articles; Zohar-Pinhasi and the magazine's marketing staff defended consumer information as a service sought by readers.

Orna Nenner became editor-in-chief in June 1999. She described her approach as combining enjoyable reading with practical information, investigative reporting and women's advancement. A 2004 article reported that her staff numbered about 100 and that she changed both the content mix and the graphic design; the removal of the knitting columns drew complaints from readers. The 3,000th issue, in October 2004, was produced as a special album-format edition. Personal features and articles about careers, relationships and the division of household work became more prominent. She also introduced the column "A Room of One's Own" and articles on the economic value of housework. The column Hamichtav Shelo Nichtav ("The Unwritten Letter"), which she had founded in the newspaper supplement Zmanim Moderniyim and brought to La'Isha in 1999, published genuine letters addressed to people with whom readers had left something unsaid.

=== Under Karina Shtotland (2014–present) ===
In 2014 Karina Shtotland succeeded Orna Nenner, who had edited the magazine for 15 years, as editor-in-chief. She had previously edited Yedioth Ahronoth's lifestyle supplement Zmanim Moderniyim for about six years and, before joining the group, had worked at magazines including At.

Under her editorship the magazine expanded its coverage of obstacles to women's participation and advancement, including violence, employment discrimination, prostitution, single parenthood and women's health. The jury of the Sokolov Award, which she received in 2021, cited this expansion of the magazine's coverage of barriers to women's integration in society and in the home. According to Ynet, she was the first editor of a women's magazine to receive the prize since its establishment in 1956.

Several editorial decisions in this period concerned how the magazine addressed its readers. In October 2017 Shtotland announced that it would address readers in the Hebrew feminine plural instead of the masculine plural conventionally used for general audiences, while keeping inclusive forms in the food and children's sections so as not to imply that housework and childcare were women's responsibilities alone. In a 2019 column she described meetings at which some subscribers asked for only uplifting content, and argued that alongside its leisure material the magazine had a responsibility to address violence against women; the editorial team also ran a website on the subject, Lo Merimot Yadayim. In a 2021 interview she said she saw no contradiction between feminism and an interest in fashion; the interviewer listed among the magazine's projects one on involved fatherhood and the balance between work and family.

The period also included the cover project "You Will Not Rape Us into Silence" (2016), the black helpline cover (2021), the first cover addressed to violent men (2022) and the permanent printing of the helpline number on the magazine's spine from 2025; the 2021 cover and the 2025 initiative received international advertising awards. A study of the magazine's coverage during the first year of the Gaza war, however, argued that it largely avoided institutional criticism and retreated from the feminist perspective that had previously characterised it.

For its 75th anniversary in 2022, the magazine launched a searchable online archive of nearly 4,000 covers dating from 1947, accompanied by articles about their history. Its 4,000th issue followed in 2023, with a retrospective tracing its development from a small publication focused on homemaking, thrift and grooming into a broader magazine covering personal stories, society, culture, health, sexuality, careers and fashion.

== Content and editorial identity ==
=== Service journalism and public affairs ===
La'Isha combines interviews, features and personal narratives with recurring coverage of fashion, beauty, food, health, family life, relationships, travel, culture and consumer affairs. Scholars have described its editorial identity as containing competing ideas about femininity: domestic and family responsibilities appear alongside women's economic independence and participation in public life.

Einat Lachover's research on social protest identified the personal story as a means of connecting readers to wider political and economic questions. In the early 1970s, accounts of families experiencing poverty, housing campaigns and factory workers included discussion of pay discrimination, promotion and trade-union representation. Her comparison with the 2011 Israeli social justice protests found a more restricted civic role in the later coverage. A separate study of the 2011 protests reported that the magazine sent six of its writers to protest encampments and streets, publishing their personal columns in its issue of 8 August 2011; the study found that coverage was confined to that issue and centred on the writers' personal experiences, and concluded that commercial women's magazines offered only limited political discussion.

=== Changing representations of women ===
Early departments focused on motherhood, childcare, beauty, sewing patterns and cooking. This domestic emphasis coexisted with profiles of working and public women and discussion of rights in legal advice and readers' letters. Moran Pollack's analysis of issues from 1970, 1973, 1977 and 1980 found continued emphasis on family and appearance, but increasing coverage of women entering occupations conventionally associated with men, unequal pay and hiring discrimination. A 1977 feature about single Israeli women aged 25–35 discussed personal freedom, cohabitation and relationships without treating marriage as an immediate goal. More independent representations nevertheless coexisted with stereotypes centred on women's appearance.

A study of the magazine's discussion of paid employment in 1967–1977 identified elements of both liberal and socialist feminism. It found that La'Isha encouraged women, including mothers, to enter paid work and addressed gender and class inequality, while continuing to assign women primary responsibility for the home and children.

Social-group representation has also been studied. Yulia Shevchenko and Lachover analysed a March 2020 special issue about women who immigrated from the former Soviet Union as children or adolescents, often described as the “1.5 generation”. They identified discourses of nationality, Russianness, becoming Israeli and immigrant success, interpreting the issue as combining neoliberal feminism with a traditional gender and ethnonational order. Their findings concerned this particular issue rather than the magazine's entire coverage of post-Soviet immigrants.

Lachover's study of coverage during the first year of the Gaza war examined 51 issues, 489 feature articles and more than 1,000 shorter departmental items. It found that the magazine integrated stories of war and bereavement into lifestyle coverage, discussed the gradual return to everyday subjects with its readers, and adopted patriotic framing that emphasised resilience and women's military participation. Lachover argued that this public role was accompanied by limited institutional criticism and a retreat from the magazine's earlier feminist perspective.

=== Structure and regular features ===
==== Features over the decades ====
A retrospective published for the magazine's 4,000th issue traced changes in its regular features. Early issues carried "Figure of the Week", "These Women", a knitting column, children's photography contests and the advice column Tevat Do'ar; the 500th issue, in October 1956, also included a serialised thriller. The 1,000th issue, in May 1966, included "This Is My Problem", which presented personal problems from two perspectives, and a column on popular musicians. The 1,500th issue, in January 1976, carried columns by Shulamit Aloni, Hanna Zemer and Galila Ron-Feder, alongside "Stories from Life" by lawyer Zvi Lidsky and a horoscope.

In the mid-1970s the magazine included separate home and entertainment supplements, and in the 1980s an entertainment and culture supplement, Ad Hatzot ("Until Midnight"), and television listings. The 2,000th issue, in August 1985, carried a lesson from an illustrated self-defence course in its home section. The 2,500th issue, in March 1995, included an investigation of violent men, including those from educated and affluent backgrounds, titled "Why Do They Hit?". Regular features listed in the 3,500th issue, in May 2014, included "Everyone Has a Story", "Woman of the Week" and "It's All Relationships".

Dalia Lamdani edited the internal supplement Labayit ("For the Home"), which covered food, beauty and personal style. La'Isha Club offered beauty-care guidance and worked with the supplement; Brenner, who managed the club before joining the editorial staff, described their cooperation in a retrospective account.

==== Editor's column ====
Each issue includes a column by the editor-in-chief, which long-time subscribers interviewed in 2023 listed among the sections they keep. Under Karina Shtotland the column has also been used to explain editorial decisions and projects: in 2016 she described the preparation of "You Will Not Rape Us into Silence", in 2017 she announced the switch to the feminine plural, in 2019 she wrote about subscribers' requests for only uplifting content and the magazine's responsibility to cover violence against women, and in 2021 she explained the decision to devote the cover to a domestic violence helpline.

==== "The Unwritten Letter" ====
Hamichtav Shelo Nichtav ("The Unwritten Letter") publishes letters from readers to people to whom they never said what they wished to say. Orna Nenner founded the column in Yedioth Ahronoth's Zmanim Moderniyim supplement and brought it to La'Isha when she became its editor in 1999. According to former column editor Anat Bar-Lev Efrati, letters arrive weekly both by post and by email; they are addressed to parents and other relatives, former teachers, doctors, friends and partners, and include apologies, expressions of gratitude and attempts to come to terms with painful experiences. In 2022 the magazine ran a series in the column in which well-known women, including actresses Ayelet Zurer and Anya Bukstein, singer and actress Tzipi Shavit and presenter Miri Michaeli, wrote such letters. In the magazine's 2023 article on long-time subscribers, several named it as a favourite section.

==== Melahashim ====
The gossip column Melahashim She... ("Whispers that...") has run for decades, covering mainly celebrities and entertainers. A 2022 retrospective cited items including a 1966 report on singer Chava Alberstein's refusal to change her surname, a 1968 item on Tzipi Shavit's ambition to become "a true star", a 1972 report on a screen test by singer Ilanit, and a 1998 item on a hospital visit by Aviv Geffen. By the 3,000th issue in 2004 it had appeared for more than 50 years.

==== "What Are You Researching?" ====
In the interview column Ma At Hokeret? ("What Are You Researching?"), part of the magazine's Heder Mishelakh ("A Room of One's Own") section, Galit Hareli interviews women researchers about their work and careers. Subjects in 2026 included research on cellular ageing and neurodegenerative disease at Ben-Gurion University of the Negev, psychedelic-assisted therapy for post-traumatic stress, and couples in which one partner has Alzheimer's disease.

==== Service and leisure sections ====
Alongside features and interviews, each issue carries regular service and leisure sections. Subscribers interviewed in 2023 mentioned the health section Briut Ve-Osher ("Health and Happiness"), the beauty sections Beauty Blender and Im Ha-Yafe Sheli, the section Ze Baduk ("It's Been Tested"), travel, fashion and book sections, film recommendations, astrology and crosswords; one said she kept about 50 issues of the food supplement Chef. A relationships column, Ha-Kol Yahasim ("It's All Relationships"), was among the regular features in 2014, and a horoscope has appeared since at least the 1970s.

On the magazine's website, part of Ynet, content is organised into categories including the cover interview, personal stories, Heder Mishelakh, health, relationships, style, Chef, careers, travel, family, pregnancy and birth, menopause, fashion shoots and beauty, as well as features such as "Woman of the Week" and "Every Woman Has a Story".

=== Food and recipes ===
Recipes have appeared since the magazine's early issues. According to its food editor, Ayelet Hirschman, recipes in the 1940s were published without bylines or photographs and assumed prior knowledge; by the 1950s they addressed the reader in the feminine form, and in the 1970s some included step-by-step photographs. She also described the recipes as reflecting national circumstances, from post-war austerity to periods of abundance, and changes in the availability of ingredients such as butter. During the Yom Kippur War in 1973 the magazine published instructions for knitting hats for soldiers and recipes for wartime meals. In 2009 Yedioth Books published Ugat Ha-Shavua ("Cake of the Week"), a selection of 55 recipes from the magazine's long-running baking column, edited by Hirschman.

=== Health, parenting, books and service departments ===
Alongside fashion and food, the magazine has run departments on health, parenting, books and consumer affairs. In 2011, after health editor Tali Rozin left following seven years, Gilat Drorani was appointed health editor and Miki Maltz books editor; both had previously worked on the parenting section. Health subjects also appeared in investigative features, such as one on the overuse of medication in the mid-1970s.

=== Relationships, sexuality and readers' letters ===
Readers' letters and advice columns established a continuing exchange between the audience and the editorial staff. The 1947 Tevat Do'ar (“Mailbox”) column invited women to share personal problems and promised confidentiality. Its successors discussed family life, adolescents and intimate relationships. Later columns included “This Is My Problem”, “Stories from Life” and “The Unwritten Letter”, combining practical advice with first-person accounts. In the 2020s the magazine's website has also carried Yifat Menhardt's personal column Status: Grusha ("Status: Divorced"), about dating and relationships after divorce.

According to Yoav Kaniyas's history of sexuality in the Israeli press, the magazine's treatment developed gradually. It surveyed attitudes to sex education and discussed the Kinsey report on female sexuality in 1953 within a framework emphasising marriage and family. Gynaecologist Yair Gabor's mid-1960s medical column addressed contraception, sexually transmitted infections and premarital advice. More explicit writing on sexual pleasure followed in the 1970s, with increasingly professional and open discussion in the late 1970s and 1980s, including contributions from Ruth Westheimer and Daniel Lombroso. Kaniyas linked the change both to the sexual revolution and feminism and to the commercial appeal of intimate subjects.

In a further study, Yoav Kaniyas identified cooperation between La'Isha, At and sexology specialists during the 1980s. He distinguished explanatory reporting, personal interviews presenting experts as authoritative but accessible figures, and regular advice columns. He argued that these formats helped legitimise public discussion of sexuality while also serving commercial interests. In the second half of the decade, growing attention to AIDS shifted the emphasis from sexual satisfaction towards relationships, risks and prevention. The findings concerned the specialised press examined in the study, including La'Isha, rather than every article in the magazine.

Former editor Zvi Elgat recalled in 2004 that, during some periods, the weekly “Foreign Conversations” department also reproduced photographs of topless women from foreign magazines and attracted readers among soldiers.

The personal tone was also part of the magazine's marketing. A 1997 campaign used the slogan “La'Isha is like talking to a friend”. Globes contrasted this accessible positioning with the more fashion-oriented and elite image attributed to rival magazine At. The exposure survey cited in that report recorded 28.1% for La'Isha and 19.4% for At; the figures describe the survey reported at that time.

=== Fashion and beauty ===
Fashion and beauty coverage has ranged from practical guides and sewing patterns to reporting on trends, fashion shoots and cover photography. Historical accounts and the magazine's cover archive document a shift from home sewing, economy and adapting existing clothes to professional productions involving designers, photographers, models and celebrities.

Photographer Yaki Halperin was a recurring contributor to its visual identity. The photography documentation centre at the Eretz Israel Museum credits him with hundreds of fashion photographs, chiefly for La'Isha, and records his nickname “king of the covers”. His first cover for the magazine featured Rina Mor in 1979; later subjects included Galit Gutman, Amit Machtinger, Shirley Bouganim and Ofra Haza.

Designer Yaron Minkowski recalled sending garments to the magazine early in his career and having his designs featured on more than 40 covers. He described publication in the magazine, before the advent of social media, as a source of customers and career exposure.

Cover production also involved styling and art direction. Photographer Mula Eshet and stylist Dalia Eshet produced dozens of covers for La'Isha and Zmanim Moderniyim. In a 2016 interview, Dalia described combining garments supplied by designers with specially collected accessories to develop visual narratives. Her work also involved selecting images from film contact sheets.

The magazine's recurring swimwear issues connected its fashion photography with the Miss Israel pageant. In a 2020 retrospective of covers featuring pageant winners, designer Tamara Yovel Jones characterized 1960s styling as formal and carefully groomed. Gideon Oberson identified floral prints and pop influences in 1970s covers and a sportswear aesthetic in the 1980s. The retrospective featured work by photographers including Sami Ben-Gad, Ben Lam and Shmuel Yaari.

In a 2011 interview, photographer Eitan Tal described pitching ideas to fashion editors Dorit Bachar-Solel and Merav Frank-Hochberg before choosing models and a production team. He described editorial fashion shoots as collaborations among the photographer, stylist and producer, with the visual direction coordinated with the editor.

In the 21st century, editors have also presented some fashion and cover productions as interventions in debates about body image. In a 2024 retrospective, Karina Shtotland described the inclusion of women of different ages and sizes alongside models and beauty queens. She cited Keren Peles's 2016 swimsuit cover as an example of self-acceptance after childbirth.

=== Covers ===
According to the magazine's retrospective account, early covers featured soldiers, teachers and factory workers associated with the image of the new Israeli woman. Beauty queens and models subsequently became more prominent, followed from the 1980s by actresses, singers, journalists, athletes and businesswomen. The cover subject also increasingly became the subject of the issue's principal interview, rather than being selected mainly for a photograph and sometimes identified only by name.

Some covers addressed public issues, including the 2016 “You Will Not Rape Us into Silence” project, a photograph of Eylon Nuphar following a double mastectomy, and covers featuring survivors of violence.

The digital cover archive provides searches by year, person and tags and a timeline of 75 selected covers. Digitisation also revealed gaps in the magazine's documentation: some early photographs lacked a full identification of their subjects or photographers, leading the editorial staff to ask the public for assistance.

Other covers drew criticism. In December 2018, the hosts of a 103FM radio programme criticised the magazine for devoting a cover story to a haircut of actress Rotem Sela, arguing that in the era of the #MeToo movement a women's magazine should address more substantive issues.

== Public initiatives and professional recognition ==
=== Miss Israel ===
Hemda Nofekh-Mozes conceived the Israeli beauty pageant in 1949, and the first competition took place in 1950. According to a 2004 retrospective, the magazine's first call for entrants went unanswered; the editors then printed photographs of foreign models as though they were candidates, and the following week received many photographs of young Israeli women. Miriam Yaron, who was married and had an infant child, became its first winner. Archival film shows the inaugural ceremony before a large audience; during the 1950s, the events combined entertainment with sponsorship by cosmetics companies and the magazine.

Historian Julie Grimmeisen interpreted the pageant as a new public arena for the celebration of women's bodies. In her account, the beauty queen offered the young Israeli society an image of glamour and modernity that existed in tension with the female pioneer and the collective ideals of work and sacrifice. For more than seven decades, La'Isha introduced contestants and covered the finals, featuring winners in interviews, fashion shoots and cover stories. Winners represented Israel internationally: Rina Mor won Miss Universe 1976, and Linor Abargil won Miss World 1998. The selection of Rana Raslan in 1999, the first Arab Israeli winner, and Yityish Aynaw in 2013, the first winner of Ethiopian origin, also attracted attention to questions of representation and belonging.

The finals were broadcast live on television from the 1990s. In 2015, the magazine moved the competition to a digital format with Ynet, seeking a younger audience as the traditional format lost relevance. Contestants were introduced in videos, viewers participated in voting, and the final was streamed online. Campaign representatives told Globes that approximately half a million people watched the live stream.

The pageant was also criticised for objectifying women and promoting a narrow ideal of beauty. The debate appeared within the magazine itself, where the competition was discussed both as a route to professional opportunities and social mobility and as a "meat market". Grimmeisen and sociologist Hanna Herzog emphasised this ambiguity: the pageant reproduced hierarchies based on appearance while giving young women access to a public arena and opportunities for advancement.

The magazine's last competition was held in 2021. In November 2022, its organisers announced that no competition would take place that year and that no representative would be sent to Miss Universe. The magazine's competition was not subsequently resumed; by 2025 Israel's Miss Universe representative was selected by Edgar Entertainment, a private company unconnected to the magazine.

=== Cover projects and personal journalism ===
==== "You Will Not Rape Us into Silence" (2016) ====
The issue of 7 March 2016, published ahead of International Women's Day, was devoted to the project "You Will Not Rape Us into Silence" (לא תאנסו אותנו לשתוק). Its cover showed 22 women – the number of letters in the Hebrew alphabet – photographed with their faces visible and identified by name; inside, they described rape or other serious sexual assaults they had experienced. The project was led by the magazine's reporter Sharon Rofe-Ofir. It was inspired by a July 2015 cover of New York magazine showing 35 women who had accused Bill Cosby of sexual assault; that magazine's photo editor, Jody Quon, told Ynet that its staff were pleased the Israeli magazine had drawn on the idea. Editor Karina Shtotland said that rape crossed sectors, communities and religions. The Sokolov Award committee later cited the project among Shtotland's contributions to public-interest journalism when awarding her the prize in 2021.

==== Joint cover with L'Officiel Arabia (2021) ====
In February 2021, about five months after the Abraham Accords were signed, Israeli model Yael Shelbia appeared on the cover of the Dubai-based fashion magazine L'Officiel Arabia and, simultaneously, on the cover of La'Isha. Media reports at the time described it as the first time an Israeli model had appeared on the cover of a magazine from the United Arab Emirates, and presented the cover as a gesture marking the normalization of relations between the two countries. The two magazines published the same photograph on the same day. Another cover that year featured actress Kim Or Azulay alongside her 96-year-old great-grandmother, Sonia Perla Yanowitz.

==== Personal journalism and fertility preservation ====
Reporter Danielle Pesso documented the egg-freezing procedure she underwent in August 2020 in articles and an online video series. Alongside her personal experience, the project addressed the cost of fertility preservation and women's access to it. After receiving messages from readers about financial barriers, Pesso met with Naama Lazimi and spoke at a meeting of the Knesset's Committee on the Status of Women and Gender Equality on 30 November 2021, which discussed egg freezing for fertility preservation. In her account, readers' responses highlighted the difficulty of financing the procedure. In March 2022 she was interviewed about the series and the cost of the procedure on the 103FM programme Meyan Adam.

=== Positive-influence initiative and TikTok partnership ===
The magazine's Ha-Mashpi'ot Le-Tova ("Positive Influencers") project recognised well-known women for social initiatives. In 2022, the magazine described it as being in its third year; honourees included television presenter Paula Rosenberg for her work on body image.

On 8 October 2026, La'Isha and TikTok Israel held a conference in Tel Aviv addressing women's representation in decision-making, careers, mental resilience and body image. Eight content creators received recognition awards. The recognised activities included combating racism and bullying, transgender acceptance, body positivity, encouraging reading and widening access to English-language education. The eight recipients appeared together on the magazine's cover, accompanied by interviews about their activities.

=== Domestic violence helpline and *6724EVER ===
==== The black cover (2021) ====
On 21 November 2021, ahead of the International Day for the Elimination of Violence against Women, La'Isha appeared for the first time in its history without a person on its cover. The cover was entirely black apart from the number *6724, the anonymous helpline for women experiencing domestic violence operated by the organisation L.A. – Fighting Violence against Women, founded by Ruth Rasnic in 1977. Shtotland wrote that copies of the magazine are passed from hand to hand and kept for years, so that more women would encounter the number over time. The concept was developed by the advertising agency Havas Tel Aviv. According to the campaign's description, only 4% of women living with abusive partners knew the helpline number.

According to campaign figures published in the advertising press, calls to the helpline rose by about 500% after the cover appeared, and more than 1,700 women received support. A 2026 article published by the magazine said the issue was its lowest-selling of that year. Two days after publication, Ynet reported Shtotland as saying that the line usually received five to ten calls a day and had answered 75 within about a day and a half of the cover's appearance; the organisation had prepared by staffing it with a double shift of volunteers. According to the volunteers, most callers that week were women aged 30 to 40 with young children or women aged 55 to 60, and human-resources managers at large technology companies also called for advice about employees they suspected were experiencing violence at home. The campaign won gold in the Creative Media category of Israel's Granot advertising awards in 2022, where it was credited to the agency Inbar Merhav.

==== Cover addressed to men (2022) ====
In November 2022, again marking the International Day for the Elimination of Violence against Women, the magazine published its first cover addressed directly to men who use violence. Created with the advertising agency Blanco, it asked readers whether they became angry about how their partner dressed, preferred that she not meet friends, lost control during arguments or believed she was always at fault, and directed them to the men's helpline of the Women's International Zionist Organization (WIZO), which is staffed by men and operates anonymously. WIZO reported a 200% increase in calls during November; 91 calls were received in the week of publication, about 350% more than in an average week. In the column introducing the cover, Shtotland wrote that public discussion of violence against women almost always focused on victims and left violent men out of the conversation, and that the project aimed to encourage men to recognise the signs of violence, take responsibility and seek help.

==== *6724EVER (2025) ====
In the week of 26 November 2025, the magazine moved from a one-off cover to printing the number permanently on the spine of every issue, alongside a message telling women in abusive relationships that they were not alone. According to descriptions of the initiative, it was the magazine's first permanent design change since 1996 and required changes to editorial, design, distribution and legal-approval processes. Called *6724EVER, it was developed with Gideon Amichay's agency No, No, No, No, No, Yes. Shtotland said the aim was not momentary attention but a commitment that the helpline would appear every week permanently; Amichay said that domestic violence "does not have an expiration date".

The spine keeps the number visible when issues are stacked or shelved. The campaign's rationale also drew on copies circulating for months in homes, hair salons, clinics and waiting rooms, and on the possibility of finding a number in print without leaving an online search history that an abusive partner might monitor. Its creators presented it as a response to a record number of femicides in Israel in 2025, and as a continuation of the 2021 cover, which they said had not provided a lasting solution. In the column announcing the change, Shtotland cited figures of 34 women murdered on gender grounds in Israel in 2025 up to that point, compared with 29 in 2024, 28 in 2023 and 19 in 2022. According to the same column, the L.A. helpline operates 24 hours a day, seven days a week, in 14 languages, and works with agencies including the police and the Ministry of Welfare.

According to campaign figures published in the international advertising press and the magazine's report on its Clio awards, the L.A. organisation reported a 19% increase in calls during the first 60 days following the redesign, compared with the same period a year earlier; 1.25 million copies bearing the number had been printed by the time of that report, and its creators projected about 29 million by 2030.

==== International recognition ====
The magazine's domestic violence campaigns received awards in several international advertising competitions.

The 2021 black cover received a Merit in the Creative Effectiveness programme of The One Show 2022, in the Single Country or Region / CSR category. The entry stated that about 200 women in Israel had been murdered by intimate partners in the preceding decade. The same year it won bronze in the Not for Profit category of the Caples Awards and was shortlisted in the Product or Service Innovation category at the Golden Drum advertising festival.

In April 2026, *6724EVER won two bronze Clio Awards, in Media / Print and Media / Specific Target Audience, and was shortlisted in Creative Disruption / Direct. According to the Israeli marketing publication Portfolio, fewer than 5% of entries to the competition receive an award. It also received a Merit at The One Show 2026 in the Innovation / Use of Media in Print & Promotional category.

== Readership and commercial position ==
=== Readership profile ===
From its early decades, La'Isha positioned itself as a popular, broadly accessible magazine. Studies of the 1960s and 1970s describe it as addressing a wider readership of lower socio-economic and cultural status than its rival At, which targeted educated and affluent women. In 2019, Lachover noted the absence of a survey of the magazines' readership profiles in the early 21st century. Given changes in society and in the magazines themselves, she suggested that there were no substantial differences between the contemporary audiences of La'Isha and At.

Articles published in the Detroit Jewish News in 1978 reported that La'Isha printed slightly more than 70,000 copies a week, more than double the 30,000 copies of the monthly At. They noted that La'Isha was printed entirely on newsprint and described its home supplement, La'Bayit, as a handbook of money-saving tips.

An exposure survey cited in 1997 recorded 28.1% for La'Isha and 19.4% for At. The magazine then targeted all age groups, and a marketing consultant quoted by Globes described its readership as drawn more from lower socio-economic groups. Its marketing vice-president said that more than two-thirds of readers took it to bed and read it before sleeping; a campaign by the Baumann Ber Rivnay agency presented the magazine as a friend keeping the reader up to date. In 2001, Globes described La'Isha as a weekly selling hundreds of thousands of copies a week; in the same article, Miriam Nofekh-Mozes said, referring to the group's men's magazine Blazer, that she would be glad if the husband of every La'Isha reader bought it. In 2004, when its 3,000th issue appeared, the publisher reported a weekly readership of more than 600,000. These figures referred to estimated readers rather than copies sold.

Nenner's conception of the magazine's audience also included girls. In its entry to The One Show, the magazine described its copies as rarely discarded, passed between family and friends, and found in hair salons and waiting rooms.

=== Male readers ===
Although directed primarily at women, La'Isha has also had male readers. Former editor Zvi Elgat recalled that, during his tenure, the "Foreign Conversations" department was popular among soldiers. In 2004, editor Orna Nenner said that approximately one-third of its readers were men. In a 2005 interview, Nenner described La'Isha as a publication "for everyone" that could include girls, women of all kinds and men, said that columnist Amos Elenbogen represented "the male voice" in its pages, and reported that men told her they read it to understand how women think, which she regarded as a compliment. In a 2026 article, journalist Orit Merlin-Rosenzweig estimated that about a quarter of its readers were men, adding that many did not admit to it.

=== Exposure surveys ===
Later surveys by TGI, a commercial media-exposure survey, measured exposure of 9.5% in 2011, 8.3% in the second half of 2013, 7.3% in the first half of 2014 and 7.7% in the first half of 2016. These figures measure audience exposure rather than circulation or sales. The magazine remained well ahead of other women's magazines in these surveys: in the first half of 2014, At recorded 2%, and in the first half of 2016 At and Nashim each recorded 2.7% and Lady Globes 1.5%. In Kantar's TGI tables for Jewish adults aged 18 and over, La'Isha's exposure was 7.0% in 2023 and 6.7% in 2024; a survey released in July 2025 recorded 6.4% for July 2024 to June 2025, down from 7.1% a year earlier.

=== Commercial model and competition ===
The magazine forms part of the Yedioth Ahronoth group's magazine business and combines editorial material with advertising and consumer coverage. At the beginning of Zohar-Pinhasi's tenure, La'Isha had separate consumer columns for new products, children's products, fashion and beauty, and men's products. In a 1997 interview she explained that readers sought practical information on products, prices and availability alongside personal stories and entertainment. In the same report, marketing executive Hanna Raveh described cooperation between the commercial department and consumer coverage, saying that advertisers were given priority after editorial screening. Journalist Anat Balint criticised the blurring of advertising and editorial content.

For decades, its principal competitor was At, established by the Maariv group. At was launched as a monthly in 1967. In the 1960s and 1970s, La'Isha presented itself as broadly accessible, while At was associated with a more educated and affluent readership. Differences in positioning remained evident in the 1990s: La'Isha's campaign comparing reading the magazine to talking with a female friend stressed intimacy and accessibility across age and social class, while At emphasized fashion and lifestyle. At discontinued its regular print edition with its September 2021 issue and concentrated on digital publishing, while La'Isha continued as a weekly print magazine. Another competitor, Olam HaIsha, closed in May 2016 after about 35 years.

Like other Israeli print publications, La'Isha experienced declining readership as digital media expanded. A 2019 study, citing a 2017 media report by Mann and Lev-On, described it as the most widely circulated magazine of any type in Israel. Readership estimates and survey exposure rates measure the audience and should be distinguished from paid circulation.

== Digital publishing ==
According to the magazine's account of its history, the brand's digital activity began in 2004. A dedicated website developed jointly with Ynet launched in September 2006. It included independent online articles as well as material complementing the print edition, covering careers, parenting, relationships, fashion, beauty and food. Website editor Carmel Kerman described it at launch as a current companion to the print magazine.

In 2011, The Seventh Eye described the online presence of Yedioth Ahronoth's magazines, including La'Isha, as limited compared with their print prominence. It argued that magazine content tended to become submerged within Ynet's news-oriented website, placing the group's print strategy and the development of distinct digital brands in tension.

In April 2011, La'Isha gained a dedicated channel on Xnet, the lifestyle portal operated by the Yedioth Ahronoth group's magazine division. The portal also included channels for other magazines in the group. Its visual design was intended to evoke browsing a glossy print magazine, with large cover images and a separate cover for each channel.

The magazine subsequently expanded its website, social-media and video activity. Its complete print editions have also been offered through an app with browsing and issue-saving functions. In May 2014 it launched GIRLZ, a mobile app offering magazine content and tips from chefs and other contributors, including Meir Adoni and Israel Aharoni. Roughly ten days after launch it was reported to have about 20,000 users and 4 million page views, and to have reached fourth place among downloads in Israel's App Store. The National Library of Israel provides digitised issues from February 2021 onward through its newspaper collection.

The cover archive launched for the magazine's 75th anniversary in 2022 made its visual history searchable online. It includes chronological and person-based searches, tags, videos and accounts of 75 selected covers, rather than the complete contents of every issue.

The magazine also linked print covers with participation on social media. A modular cover featuring Eden Pines in July 2022 presented four outfits that readers could cut and recombine into 64 combinations. Readers were invited to photograph their versions and share them on Instagram, TikTok and Facebook, tagging the magazine.

== Editorial leadership ==
=== Editors-in-chief ===
Editor	Tenure	Sources
Aharon Shamir	1947–1952	
David Krasik	1953–1979	
Zvi Elgat	1979–1996	
Iris Zohar-Pinhasi	1996–1999	
Orna Nenner	1999–2014	
Karina Shtotland	2014–present	

Men oversaw day-to-day editing for most of the magazine's first five decades, although much of its writing staff consisted of women.

=== Contributors ===
Contributors over the decades have included journalists, professionals and public figures. In the 1950s Shifra Bar-Tov reported on a 1953 survey of attitudes to sex education; in the mid-1960s gynaecologist Yair Gabor wrote the medical column "What Do You Think, Doctor?", and in the late 1970s and 1980s the magazine carried columns by Ruth Westheimer and Daniel Lombroso. Columnists in the 1,500th issue in 1976 included Shulamit Aloni, Hanna Zemer and Galila Ron-Feder. The civil-rights campaigner Shulamit Aloni wrote a regular column for the magazine for more than twenty years. Hanna Zemer, who also edited the daily Davar, wrote an almost weekly personal column from 1969 to 1991, covering politics, economics and security as well as food, fashion and her own experiences; in it she criticised women's magazines for lacking a clear political voice. Photographer Yaki Halperin took hundreds of fashion photographs for the magazine, beginning with a cover in 1979.

More recent contributors have included Amos Elenbogen, described by editor Orna Nenner in 2005 as representing "the male voice" in the magazine; journalist Gafi Amir, a regular columnist from 2010 to 2015; food editor Ayelet Hirschman; journalist Orit Merlin-Rosenzweig, who worked at the magazine for about thirty years and co-created the documentary about it; and reporter Sharon Rofe-Ofir, who led the 2016 project on sexual assault. In 2011 the magazine's columnists included Ayelet Shani, Anat Mordechai, Liat Bar-On, Dafna Levi and Karen Ohayon, who with Rofe-Ofir wrote personal columns on the social protests of that summer.

=== Editors-in-charge ===
Hemda Nofekh-Mozes was the founding editor-in-charge from 1947 until her death in 1989. Her daughter-in-law, Miriam Nofekh-Mozes, held the position from 1990 until the end of 2025; according to a 2026 article published by the magazine, she brought women into editing and management roles. In November 2025 the Nofekh-Mozes family announced the sale of its shares in the Yedioth Ahronoth group to Arnon (Noni) Mozes, and it was reported that Miriam Nofekh-Mozes would leave the magazine at the end of the year after 35 years. This supervisory role is distinct from that of the editor-in-chief responsible for everyday editorial work.

== Research, criticism and cultural significance ==
The magazine's continuous publication since the Mandate period has provided material for research on Israeli women, popular culture, consumption and the Hebrew press. Studies have examined domesticity and paid employment, protest, war, beauty ideals and women's participation in public life. A study at Bar-Ilan University analysed 143 issues published between 1947 and 2002. It found that practical-information and self-help departments were the most frequent throughout, that the letters section reflected a two-way relationship with readers, and that with the growth of consumer culture the beauty and consumer departments became almost entirely advertorial.

Researchers have identified competing ideological strands rather than a single consistent position. Sonia Leiden examined the magazine as a setting in which women's lives were represented and constructed; Moran Pollack found that traditional images remained prominent in the 1970s alongside increasingly independent and critical representations. Einat Lachover contrasted its substantial engagement with social protest in the early 1970s with its more limited treatment of the 2011 social-justice protests. Other studies addressed Holocaust survivors' personal testimony, women's employment, post-Soviet immigrant women and wartime reporting.

Public criticism has similarly concerned consumerism, the boundaries between editorial material and advertising, restrictive beauty standards and traditional gender roles. Commentators have also pointed to the magazine's practical information on health, law, sexuality, work and violence, and its publication of women's first-person accounts. In an article marking the 3,000th issue, Amalia Rosenblum argued that, despite its gossip and consumer material, it connected women and circulated information relevant to their quality of life.

In January 2022, sustainable-fashion researcher Meital Peleg Mizrachi criticised the magazine in The Seventh Eye for sharing a humorous social-media post about an aircraft filled with Shein parcels shortly after publishing an issue devoted to sustainable fashion. She argued that the post normalised excessive consumption and contradicted the magazine's sustainability message.

The magazine also served as a reference point for Arabic-language women's journalism. In a 2015 interview with journalist Samah Salaime in Local Call, Khitam Dahla, editor of Ishraqa, the Islamic Movement's Arabic-language women's monthly, said that her team had used La'Isha as an editorial model when establishing the publication. She cited its combination of women's topics with interviews and accounts of women's initiative and achievement.

The magazine has also figured in discussions of the dismissive treatment of women's journalism and its readers. Yoram Taharlev's 1967 song Yeshnan Banot ("There Are Girls") mocked girls who read what it called the magazine's nonsense. Later commentators and the filmmakers documenting La'Isha used this cultural reference to discuss the discrepancy between its reputation as light entertainment and its role in recording women's lives and raising subjects with less visibility in the general press.

== Documentary film ==
The 56-minute documentary La'Isha – The Story of a Women's Magazine (Hebrew title: Ha-sodot shel La'Isha, "The Secrets of La'Isha") screened at Docaviv in 2026. Directed by Anna Somershaf and written by Somershaf and Orit Merlin-Rosenzweig, it was produced by Osnat Trabelsi through Trabelsi Productions for HOT8, with support from the Makor Foundation for Israeli Films. Interviews, readers' letters and archival material explore the relationship between the magazine and its audience, and the tension between commercial demands and social change.

Interviewees included Miriam Nofekh-Mozes, Karina Shtotland, Orna Nenner, Bruria Avidan-Barir, Naomi Levanon-Keshet, historian Bat-Sheva Margalit Stern and journalist Yigal Glai. The film addresses the beauty pageant, erotic material and sex advertising formerly carried by the magazine, harassment experienced by journalists, and the emergence of a more explicitly feminist editorial position.

Reception was mixed. Portfolio awarded it four stars and found it thought-provoking, while criticising the static photography and absence of additional contemporary perspectives. Walla! praised the interviews and archive material, but argued that condensing nearly eight decades into an hour produced a chronological account with too little observation of the present-day newsroom. A less favourable Israel Hayom review considered it too close to a promotional film, while acknowledging the magazine's value for understanding Israeli society.

== See also ==
- At (magazine)
- Israeli fashion
- Media of Israel
- Women in Israel
