= Judy Shalom Nir-Mozes =

Israeli broadcaster (born 1958)

- ג'ודי שלום ניר מוזס
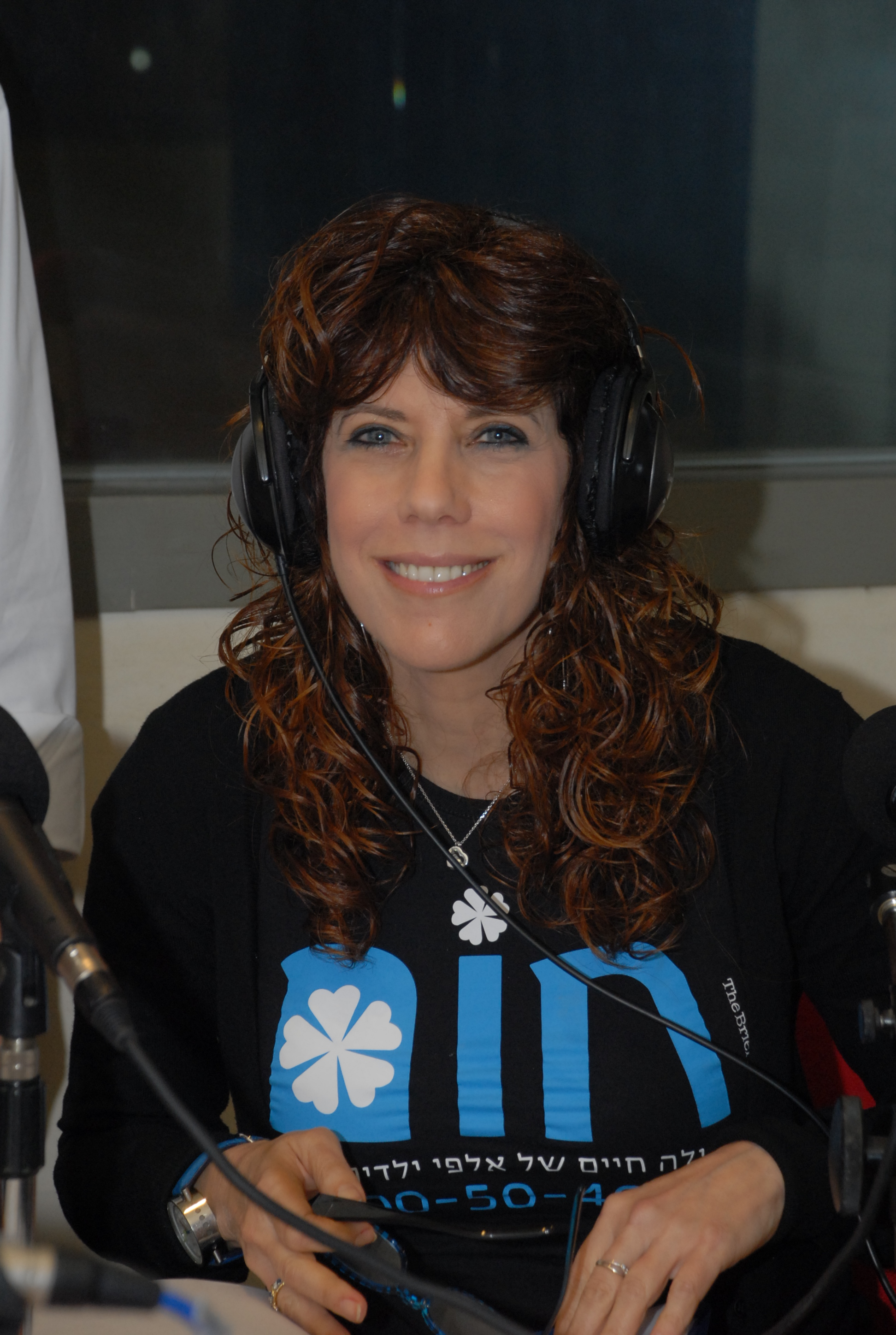
- 2011
- Born: Judy (Judith) Mozes; August 14, 1958 (age 67); Ramat Gan, Israel
- Occupations: Journalist; Radio
- Spouses: Amiram Nir (m. 1982; died 1988) Silvan Shalom (m. 1993–2017)
- Children: 5
- Parent: Noah Mozes (father)
- Relatives: Arnon Mozes (brother); Tammy Mozes (sister)
- Website: judymozes.com

Judy Shalom Nir-Mozes (Hebrew: ג'ודי שלום ניר מוזס; born 14 August 1958) is an Israeli socialite, investor and talk show host.

== Early life ==
Judy (Judith) Mozes was born in Ramat Gan to Paula and Noah Mozes, owners of the Yedioth Ahronoth newspaper, their third child after Gilad Mozes, who was killed in a car accident in 1959, and Arnon Mozes, the current newspaper publisher. Her youngest sister is Tammy Mozes, who currently owns several Israeli companies.

She attended Ohel Shem and "Hadash" high schools. In the Israel Defense Forces she served as an official hostess for different public personalities at Sde Dov Airport in Tel Aviv.

== Career ==
In 1994, after her mother Paula Mozes died, control of the newspaper was transferred to Judy's brother Arnon Mozes. Together, Judy and Arnon gained control of the newspaper from their youngest sister Tammy, their cousins, and the editor-in-chief editor of the newspaper, Dov Yudkovsky after years of struggle. A few years later Tammy sold her share of the newspaper to Arnon and several other companies.

In addition to her family ascription and her family business, Judy has written for years in the weekend edition of Yedioth Ahronoth, "7 days," and hosted a TV show on Channel 2, "Jude Luck." Today she has a weekly show on Reshet Bet of Kol Yisrael on Fridays at 11 p.m., where she talks about current events in the fields of politics, the economy and entertainment.

In April 2005, Nir-Mozes gave Prince Charles a gold talisman from Yitzhak Kaduri as a wedding present on the eve of his marriage to Camilla Parker Bowles. She said she had given a similar talisman to Bill Clinton during his presidency.

Judy is also a permanent panel member on the current events program "Talking About It From Home". The show is hosted by Emmanuel Rosen live from the studio and the panel members, Judy among them, from home.

In February 2010 she joined an investment partnership with millionaire Zaki Rakib that will focus on investments in communications, media, health, and lifestyle. In March 2012 she joined Rakib and George Soros in investing a reported $500 million in a 4G mobile venture in Brazil's Sao Paulo state.

== Controversies ==
On June 22, 2011, she was the first to confirm in a tweet the rumor that journalist Yair Lapid would leave his career in journalism and enter politics. As the wife of the serving Vice Prime Minister, her assertion attracted media attention. Channel 2, which then employed both Mozes and Lapid, denied it, as did Lapid himself. Ultimately, Lapid announced he would run for the Knesset on January 8, 2012.

During Operation Pillar of Defense in November 2012, her husband's social media accounts were attacked by hackers. She tweeted in response in Hebrew that "“The murderers have taken over Silvan’s Facebook, Twitter and email." During the conflict, she tweeted “I hope that today they decide to destroy Gaza if they don’t stop shooting. Let them suffer as well” and “It’s not fair that we’re sleeping here in silence and a million people down south live under fire! We need to bomb Gaza.” In the aftermath, she resigned as the chairperson of UNICEF Israel after activists launched a Facebook campaign against her and what they labeled as her "racist comments."

On June 21, 2015, she provoked an angry international response when she tweeted “Do u know what Obama Coffee is? Black and weak.” She deleted the post shortly afterwards, adding another one in which she stated "I apologize, that was a stupid joke somebody told me." In a subsequent tweet she personally apologized to President Obama, followed, a minute later, by another tweet in which she wrote "Sorry if I caused any offence to anyone. I hope I will stay married when my husband will land and hear what I did" (her husband, who was abroad at the time, was responsible for Israel's strategic dialogue with the United States). The next day, White House Press Secretary Josh Earnest responded that "on Twitter you are limited to 140 characters, but it still has the capacity to be quite revealing."

== Personal life ==
In 1982 she married journalist Amiram Nir, with whom she had two children, Nimrod and Nadav. In 1985 her father was killed in a car accident in front of the Yedioth Ahronoth headquarters and ownership of the newspaper was transferred to her mother, Paula. In 1988 Amiram Nir died in a plane crash in Mexico. Five years later, in 1993, she remarried, to MK Silvan Shalom from the Likud party, who served in various ministerial positions in Israel, with whom she has three children. The couple separated in 2017 and divorced in 2021.

In 2023, she moved to New York City with her partner, Avi Rotenberg.
