= Arnon Mozes =

Israeli businessman (born 1953)

- ארנון מוזס
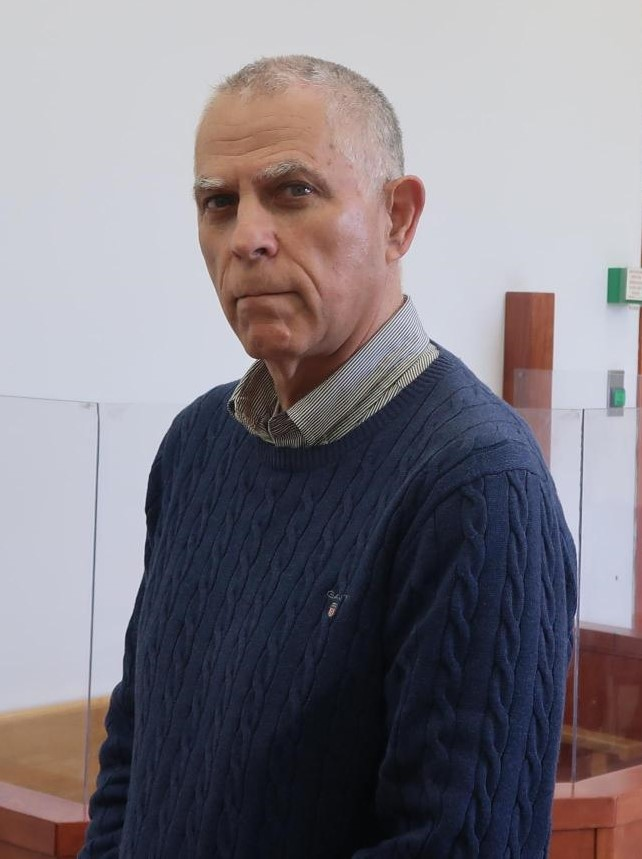
- Arnon Mozes in 2024
- Born: 1 April 1953 (age 72); Ramat Gan, Tel Aviv, Israel
- Occupations: Businessman; chief editor
- Father: Noah Mozes

Arnon "Noni" Mozes (Hebrew: ארנון מוזס; born 1 April 1953) is the editor-in-chief, controlling owner and chair of the board of directors in the Israeli newspaper Yedioth Ahronoth. Mozes' media career has resulted in close ties to many Israeli government officials, including Benjamin Netanyahu, Ehud Olmert and Haim Ramon.

== Early life ==
Mozes was born in Ramat Gan as the second of four children of Noah Mozes, managing editor of the newspaper Yedioth Ahronoth and Paula Mozes, an owner of Yedioth Ahronoth. Mozes studied in Ramat Gan at the "Nitzanim" elementary school and the Ohel Shem high school. When he was about five years old, his older brother was run over by a bus and seriously injured. He eventually died a month later from his injuries.

On 25 September 1967 Mozes was driving his father's car at the age of 14 in his neighborhood in Ramat Gan when he lost control of the car. In the presence of his father, Mozes fatally ran over 10-year-old Rachel Shabi, who was walking on the sidewalk. His father was sentenced to a year in prison, but was released five months later following after Israeli president Zalman Shazar commuted his sentence.

During his service in the IDF Mozes served as a youth commander. After his military service, he completed a bachelor's degree in economics at Tel Aviv University, and studied for one year for a master's degree in economics at Boston University, but did not complete the degree. In those years he played basketball for four seasons in the senior team of Maccabi Ramat Gan basketball club, and then one season in Hapoel Ramat Gan, two top teams in the Israeli National League, the first league at the time.

== Business career ==
Mozes became involved in Yedioth Ahronoth during his twenties, where he served as a sports reporter. Under the auspices of his father, he became increasingly involved in the newspaper's editing and production, becoming an actual editor. During this time, the company did not have a CEO, and management was spread among several deputy directors.

In 1985 Mozes's father died after a bus accident. This created a succession struggle in the newspaper, with Arnon cooperating with his sister Judy Nir Mozes against other competitors, including several cousins, their sister Tammy Mozes-Borovitch and Dov Judkovski, who served as acting editor until 1989.

In 1994 Mozes's mother, Paula Mozes, died of cancer. In her inheritance she left control of the newspaper to Noni Moses. His sisters Judy and Tammy were given a share of ownership, but are not involved in the day-to-day management. There was again a battle over inheritance of the newspaper, and the newspaper remained in Arnon Mozes's ownership. Judy gave up her shared in the newspaper to Noni, while Tammy fought for four years before giving in and selling her shares to businessman Eliezer Fishman, who owned the newspaper Globes. Tammy's shares, valued at about 45–60 million USD, were transferred to Bank Hapoalim following Fishman's bankruptcy.

In 1992 Moshe Vardi, as editor of Yedioth Ahronoth, sought to locate the source of information leaks from the newspaper, and began wiretapping Judkovski. In 1996, Mozes fired Vardi after he was indicted for the wiretapping, and appointed Eylon Shalev in his place. In 1998, Vardi was convicted of using wiretaps, but was acquitted of ordering them. The police also investigated Mozes, but ended the case after a lack of evidence. In 1999, Mozes dismissed Vardi's charges and re-hired him into the company.

During Mozes' time many magazines were added to the Yediot Ahronoth group, including Pnai Plus, Blazer, Go Style and more, and in 2008 the economic daily Calcalist began to appear. The group also published Vesti, which was aimed at immigrants from the Soviet Union. Mozes Joined the partnership in the record company NMC Music.

In 2011 Moses sold about 13% of his holdings in Hot Telecommunication Systems, amounting to about 650 million shekels, to businessman Patrick Drahi, and kept about 3% of the company's shares.

In the 2010s Yedioth Ahronoth found itself in fierce competition with the free Israel Hayom. During this period, Mozes also led the transfer of the Yedioth Ahronoth group from several buildings in Tel Aviv to a shared building in Rishon LeZion. In 2013, the Yedioth Ahronoth building in Tel Aviv was sold to David Azrieli for 374 million shekels.

In 2019 Mozes acquired 34% of Yedioth Communications for 300 million shekels. This places him in control of 58% of the company's shares and 60% of the voting rights, making him the controlling shareholder.

== Relationship with the government ==
According to journalist Mickey Rosenthal in 2007, who worked for the newspaper during the 1990s, there was never external interference during his time working there. But there was a list of individuals that he should not interact with, including some from the Minister of Communications and also from Hot Telecommunications, which Mozes has a 16% ownership.

Nir Bachar, who served as a supplement editor at the newspaper, claimed in an affidavit he submitted to the court that editor Rafi Ginat and publisher Mozes delayed investigations against prime minister Ariel Sharon and his son Omri in summer 2003, investigations that ultimately led to Omri Sharon's conviction. According to Bachar, a similar incident occurred in the publication against businessman Martin Schlaff in the Cyril Keren affair. In addition, Bachar claimed that Ginat and Mozes initiated investigations against various individuals with whom Mozes had a conflict, such as former Deputy Attorney General Davida Lachman-Messer, who opposed cross ownership among Israeli media.

Journalist Moti Gilat, who used to work at Yedioth Ahronoth, claimed that Mozes either refused to publish articles that exposed government wrongdoing or corruption or would ask to shorten them and omit some of the content. According to Gilat, these typically concerned politicians who Mozes had connections with, such as Ehud Olmert and Haim Ramon. Gilat also claimed that Mozes intervened to prevent the publication of investigation into the Greek island affair, which involved Ariel Sharon, Ehud Olmert and David Appel. In 2007, Gilat sent Mozes a letter detailing his dissatisfaction with Mozes's management of the newspaper.

Another journalist who used to work at the newspaper, Gidi Weitz, also claimed to face internal problems while working there, such as difficulty when investigating suspected criminal activities involving David Appel, Gilad and Omri Sharon. Uri Misgav also claimed that the newspaper did not publish an interview he conducted with Isaac Herzog due to a decision from Mozes.

According to reporters in the newspaper, public figures received different coverage based on Mozes' personal ties. Those with warm ties, such as the Sharon family, Haim Ramon, Ehud Olmert, Avigdor Lieberman, and Tzipi Livni, received positive coverage, while enemies received negative or no coverage.

=== Case 2000 ===
In January 2017 the Israeli police began to investigate Mozes about his dealings with Benjamin Netanyahu as part of Case 2000. He was accused of reporting on Netanyahu positively, and in return Netanyahu allegedly promised to pass legislation that would harm Israel Hayom, which was the main competitor of Mozes' media business. Even though the deal did not materialize, Mozes still allegedly favored Netanyahu in his coverage by minimizing negativity around his wife Sara while highlighting negative reporting around Naftali Bennett, Netanyahu's main political rival. In February 2018, Mozes denied the bribery allegations involving Netanyahu and himself.

On 28 February 2019 attorney general Avichai Mandelblit indicted Mozes on bribery charges, and the trial began in May 2020. In December 2020, the Israel Press Council ruled that Yedioth Ahronoth must suspend Mozes from journalism until his criminal proceedings are over. However, as the council had no enforcement mechanism, Mozes continued his position in the company.

== Personal life ==
In the late 1970s Arnon Mozes married Michal, with whom he has four children. The couple resided in Savyon, and separated in the early 2000s. During the divorce proceedings, Mozes allegedly used a famous rabbi to influence the case in his favor, and a police investigation was opened on this matter.

Mozes's first daughter, Hadas Mozes-Lichtenstein, worked at Yedioth Ahronoth as director of business development, who was responsible for legal advice for the modeling and acting agency ADD. His second daughter, Keren Mozes, was appointed CEO of the Israeli Female Basketball Premier League in June 2021.
