= Congregation Amijai =

Conservative synagogue in Buenos Aires, Argentina

- Spanish: Comunidad Amijai
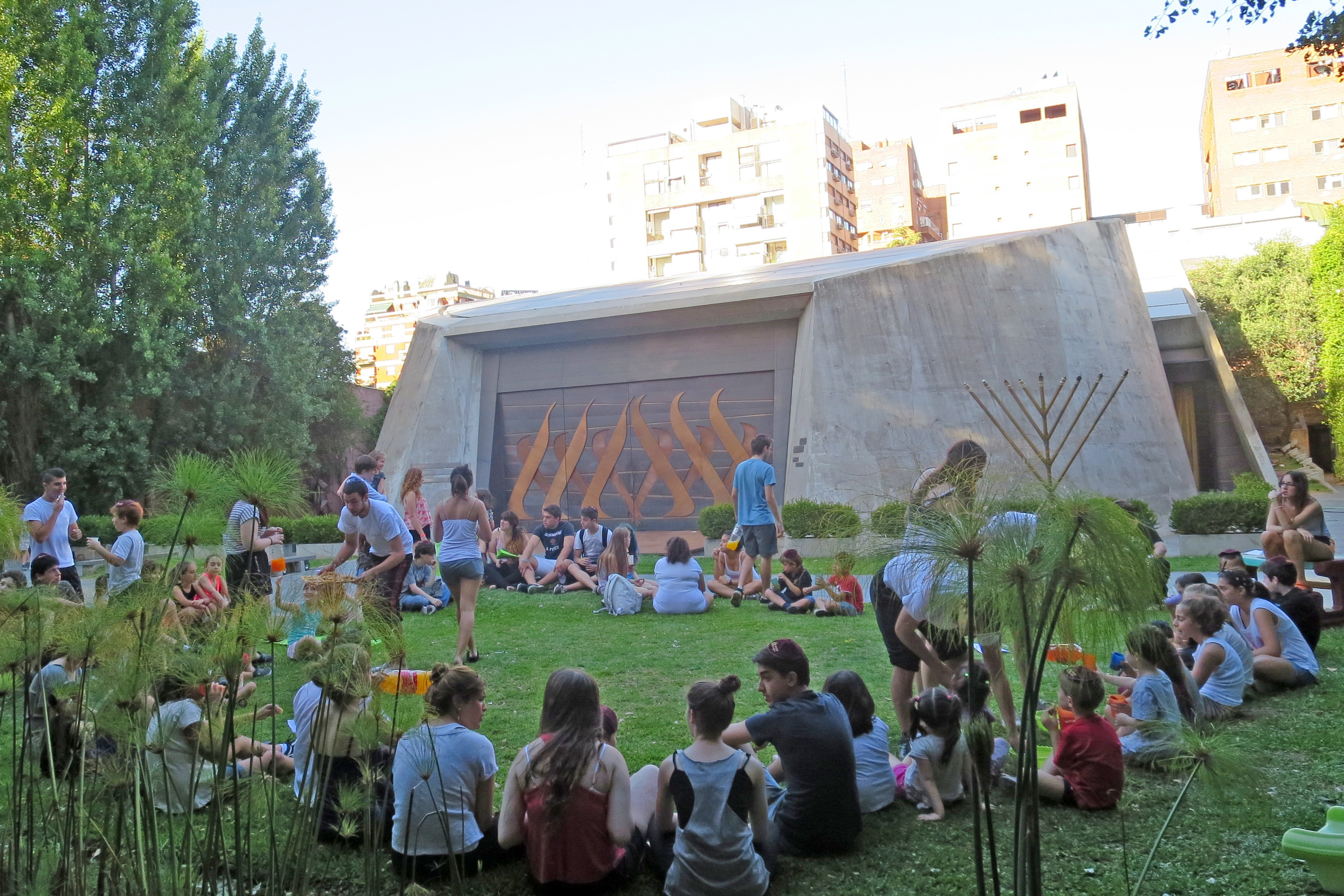
- The synagogue exterior in 2013

- Location of the synagogue in Buenos Aires

Religion
- Affiliation: Conservative Judaism
- Rite: Masorti Judaism
- Ecclesiastical or organizational status: Synagogue
- Status: Active

Location
- Location: Belgrano, Buenos Aires
- Country: Argentina
- Interactive map of Congregation Amijai
- Coordinates: 34°33′20″S 58°27′07″W

Architecture
- Architect: Urgell-Penedo-Urgell
- Type: Synagogue architecture
- Established: 1993 (as a congregation)
- Completed: 2002

Specifications
- Capacity: 900 worshippers
- Interior area: 3,500 m^{2} (38,000 sq ft)

Website
- amijai.org

The Congregation Amijai is a Conservative (or Masorti) Jewish congregation and synagogue, located in the Belgrano neighborhood of Buenos Aires, Argentina. The congregation was established in 1993 and the synagogue completed in 2002. The synagogue building is regularly used as a concert venue.

== History ==
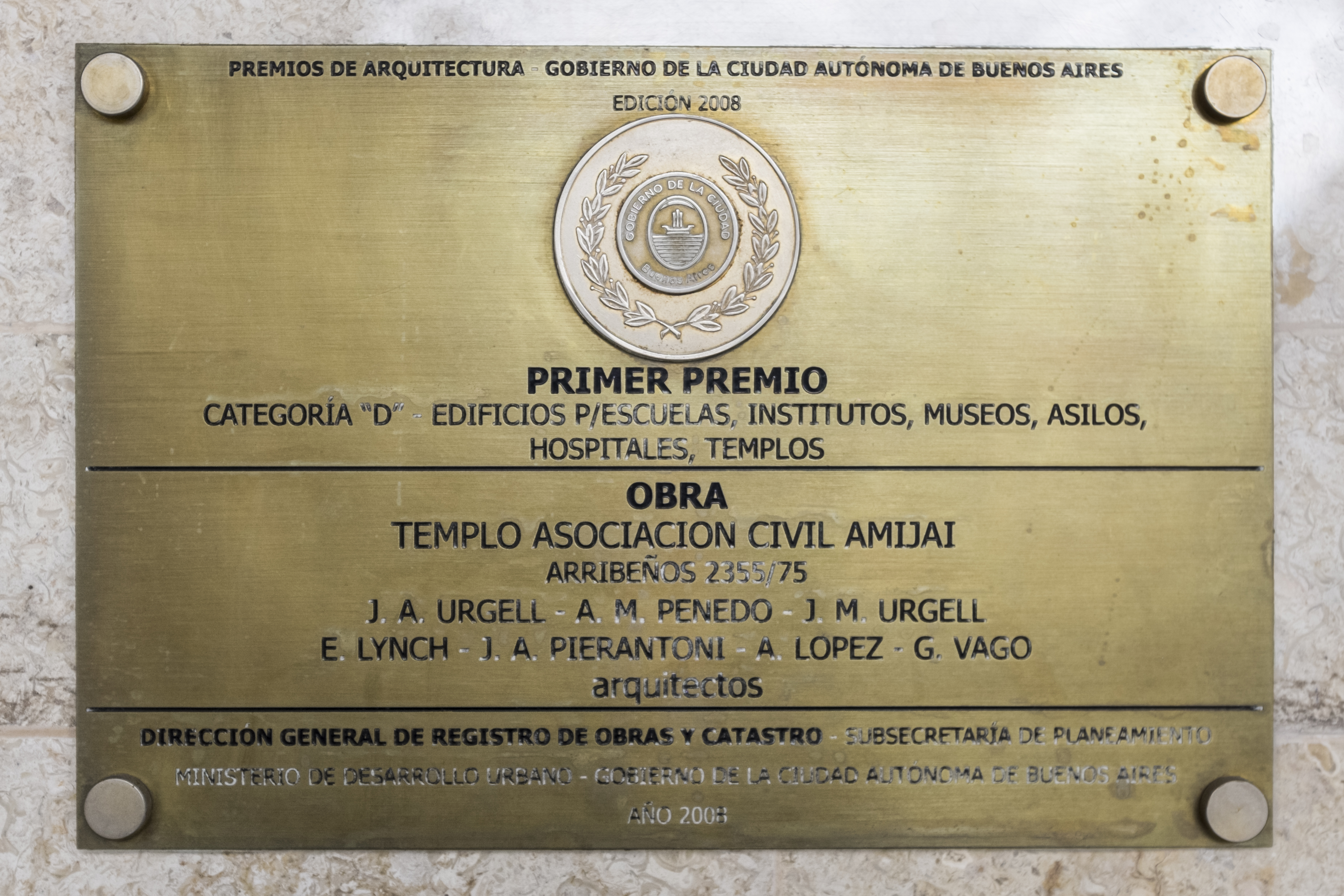
Placa con el Premio, al frente del edificio la Comunidad Amijai en Buenos Aires (in Spanish)

In 1993 several Jewish families in the Belgrano neighborhood of Buenos Aires decided to form a new Masorti congregation and chose Darío Feiguin as their rabbi. The name of the new synagogue, "Amijai" means "my nation lives" in Hebrew. Their first few services were held at the Seminario Rabínico Latinoamericano. In 2001, thanks to a donation from businessman Natalio Garber, former owner of Musimundo, the congregation purchased an old safe factory next to Chinatown to construct their own building.

== Architecture ==
The congregation chose architecture firm Urgell-Penedo-Urgell, winner of the Konex Award for architecture to design their building. The building took 16 months to complete and involved input from a variety of different architects. After the 1994 AMIA Bombing, the synagogue was built to be bomb-proof.

The building area is approximately 3,500 m^{2} (38,000 sq ft) and, in addition to the synagogue, includes a community dining hall, classrooms, administrative offices for staff and Rabbis, a library and meeting spaces. The building was constructed out of reinforced concrete and includes a V-shaped roof which allows for 25 meters of light to enter the building.

The main temple is used for concerts and is known for its good acoustics.

In 2008 the building won the First Prize in Architecture from the Government of the Ciudad Autónoma de Buenos Aires as one of the best examples of architecture in the city. The doors of the main temple are made of natural bronze. The Altar was made of carved wood by local artists. The main temple seats 900 people. The architectural work was selected for the 2012 Venice Biennale and was featured in that year's arts and architecture catalog.

During the construction of the building, a design contest was held for a Tree of life art piece in the temple garden to honor the memory of congregants' loved ones. Submissions were submitted anonymously with pseudonyms, and a design by Clorindo Testa was chosen. The aim of the piece was to have bronze leaves representing lost loved ones illuminated by an eternal flame.

== Religious life ==
Congregation Amijai is dedicated to the study of Torah and the congregation respects the dietary laws of kashrut. The congregation believes "in a Judaism far from bourgeois comfort, ignorance, individualism, compulsion and fear." The synagogue gives charitably to the community, with monthly tzedakah collections, collaboration with the local non-profit Sonrisas in the town of Esteban Echeverría, a community dining room/soup kitchen for homeless and low income residents and winter clothing drives.

The Congregation supports the Argentine Ecumenical Movement and participates in the National Plan for Cultural Equality. In 2014 Rabbi Alejandro Avruj joined Pope Francis as part of the interfaith delegation of the Pope's visit to the Middle East. Rabbi Avruj worked alongside the Pontiff on social justice related issues when the latter was Archbishop of Buenos Aires and thus was invited to participate as part of the delegation. In an attempt to foster peace between Jews and Palestinians, the synagogue organizes and promotes recitals and concerts with both Jewish and Palestinian artists.

== Arts and culture ==
In addition to prayer services, the synagogue building hosts regular concerts, lectures, ballet, theatre and dance performances. The music performances include a variety of different genres, including jazz, klezmer, zarzuela, tango, classical, chamber music, folk music, rock, religious music, country, and ópera. It was anonymously gifted a 19th-century Steinway pianos.

Those who have performed concerts in the synagogue have included Darío Volonté, Daniel Barenboim, Luis Alberto Spinetta, Camerata Bariloche, Pinchas Zukerman, the Russian National Orchestra, the Harlem Opera Theater, the Youth Symphony Orchestra of Hesse, la Kammerphilarmonie de Frankfurt, Martha Argerich, Sandra Mihanovich, Bruno Gelber, Atilio Stampone, Hermeto Pascoal, Chango Spasiuk, Jaime Torres, and Pedro Aznar, plus others.

== See also ==
- History of the Jews in Argentina
- List of synagogues in Argentina
