= Noah Mozes =

Israeli newspaper editor (1912–1985)

- נח מוזס
- Born: 1912
- Died: October 7, 1985 (73 years of age); Tel Aviv, Israel
- Occupations: Agronomist; Newspaper publisher and managing editor
- Employer: Yedioth Aharonoth
- Spouse: Paula Mozes
- Children: Arnon "Noni" Mozes; Judy Shalom Nir-Mozes

Noah Mozes (Hebrew: נח מוזס; 1912 – October 7, 1985) was an Israeli newspaper publisher, and the long-time managing editor of the Israeli newspaper Yedioth Ahronoth.

== Biography ==
He was the son of Yehuda Mozes, and was initially an agronomist. He died on October 7, 1985, in Tel Aviv as a result of injuries incurred when he was hit by a city bus in a traffic accident, at the age of 73. His son Arnon, known as "Noni", replaced him as publisher. His widow, Paula Mozes, died in 1997.

== Media career ==
In 1955, he became the publisher and managing editor of the Israeli newspaper Yedioth Aharonoth, which in the late 1970s became Israel's biggest-selling newspaper.

== Legacy ==
The Department of Communication and Journalism at The Hebrew University of Jerusalem was named after him in 1991, in a ceremony at which President Chaim Herzog spoke.
