= Amihai (disambiguation) =

Amihai (Hebrew: עַמִּיחַי, lit. My nation lives), sometimes spelled Amichai or Amichay, is a Hebrew name. It may refer to one of the following:

== Places ==
- Amihai, an Israeli West Bank settlement

== People ==
As surname

- Gideon Amichay (1963–), Israeli advertising executive
- Yehuda Amichai (1924–2000), Israeli poet

As first name

- Amihai Grosz (1979–), Israeli violinist
- Amihai Mazar (1942–), Israeli archaeologist
- Amichai Paglin (1922–1978), Israeli businessman and militant
- Amichai Chasson (1987–), Israeli poet, curator and filmmaker
- Amichai Chikli (1981-), Israeli politician

== Organizations ==
- Amihai, an Israeli publishing house
- Amihai, an Israeli NGO for children with special needs
