= David Appel (businessman) =

Israeli businessman (born 1950)

- דוד אפל
- Born: August 7, 1950 (age 75); Israel
- Occupation: Businessman
- Political party: Likud party
- Criminal charges: Bribing Israeli politician Ariel Sharon in the Greek Island Affair
- Criminal penalty: 3.5 years in prison

David Appel (Hebrew: דוד אפל; born 7 August 1950) is an Israeli businessman, general contractor, and Likud party activist.

== Early life and education ==
Appel was raised by his grandparents and educated in an ORT technical dormitory school in Magdiel, where he studied printing. He was not drafted into the IDF due to an injury sustained when printing machinery fell on his hand. At age 20 he joined the Likud youth organisation, where he formed lifelong friendships with many people who would later become influential Israeli politicians.:

== Career ==
In 1975 he opened a baby products store in Tel Aviv, which eventually became a national chain. He was also a partner in the Gazan UP-7 company. In 1977 he sold his chain and opened a general contracting firm with partner Shalom Prussak, which became state-recognised within three years and ultimately built thousands of housing units, many of them under contract for the Israeli Housing Ministry.:

=== Corruption charges ===
The Attorney General of Israel ruled that between 1983 and 1986, Appel's contracting company had operated in a manner violating the law, and only 13 years later in 1997 he was cleared of all charges.

In 2003 the State again brought charges against Appel, this time dealing with four separate cases of bribery and dishonest business practices. The indictment charged that he had promised civil servants reelection in exchange for approving his projects in Central Israel, especially Lod and Giv'at Shmuel. Among those accused of accepting bribes were former MK Nehama Ronen, then director of the Environment Ministry, Israel Land Administration official Oded Tal, Lod mayor Benny Regev, and Giv'at Shmuel council head Zamir ben Ari.

In 2004 he was charged with bribing Israeli prime minister Ariel Sharon, in what became known as the Greek Island Affair, and was also charged with five other bribe offenses. Attorney General Menachem Mazuz eventually ruled that Sharon could not be charged with receiving bribes from Appel. As of September 2008 all but one bribery charge against Appel had been dropped.

In 2010 he was convicted of bribery and was sentenced to 3.5 years in prison. The accusation involved a bribe to Sharon to help win approval for a development in Greece. He also started bankruptcy proceedings. He submitted a bid to return to an active role in the Migdal Hazohar urban renewal project in the Giora neighborhood of Givat Schmuel in May 2016, which was two years after he finished his prison term in 2014.
