= Gideon Amichay =

Israeli businessman (born 1963)

- גדעון עמיחי
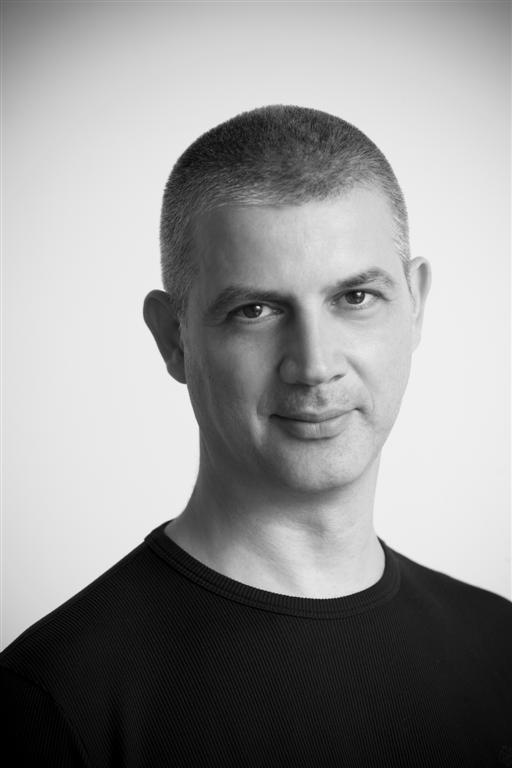
- Born: 1963 (age 62–63); Holon, Israel
- Education: Bezalel Academy of Arts and Design; Berlin School of Creative Leadership

Gideon Amichay (Hebrew: גדעון עמיחי; born 1963) is an Israeli advertising executive, marketer, and author. He is the founder and chief creative officer of No, No, No, No, No, Yes, a creative boutique in New York and Tel Aviv. He also teaches at the School of Visual Arts in New York City. From May 1994 to November 2011, he acted as the Chief Creative Officer & Joint Managing Partner at Shalmor Avnon Amichay/Y&R, Tel Aviv, Israel.

== Biography ==
Gideon Amichay was born and raised in Holon, Israel. He served in the IDF as a graphic designer and a reporter in the IDF's weekly newspaper "Bamahane". In 1990, Amichay graduated with honors from his visual Communication studies at the "Betzalel Art Academy" in Jerusalem, and School of Visual Arts in New York. In 2008, Amichay graduated with honors from his EMBA studies for company leaders at the Berlin School of Creative Leadership.

== Career ==
Amichay began drawing cartoons for television and newspapers at the age of 14. Amichay's cartoons and articles were published in many newspapers in Israel, including "Yediot Aharonot", "Globes", "Ha'aretz", "The Marker", "Calcalist" and "Ma'ariv", where he also started working as a cartoonist and journalist. Later, his cartoons were also published abroad, including in "The New Yorker" (1995).

In 1990, Amichay began his career in advertising as a creative director at the "Warshavsky Froehlich Dover/Grey" advertising agency. In May 1994, he joined Rami Shalmor and Shlomi Avnon as a partner, and the three formed the "Shalmor Avnon Amichay" agency, where he served as joint CEO and Chief Creative Officer. Later, the agency joined the international Young & Rubicam network.

From July 2011, the company's founders, Rami Shalmor, Shlomi Avnon, and Gideon Amichay, became active chairmen. Amichay gave many lectures in Israel, including in Tel Aviv University, IDC Herzliya, Hebrew University, Betzalel Art Academy, The Neri Bloomfield School, and Shenkar College.

Some of Amichay's lectures were broadcast live on Israel's Channel 2 website. Amichay was also invited to be a keynote speaker abroad, including in Eurobest (2009), New York Festivals (2010), in Shanghai, in Cannes Lions Festival (2011), in The School of Visual Arts, in Berlin School of Creative Leadership (2018) and in the Israel Marketing Association convention (2021).

Amichay was a committee member for the Israeli Cartoon Museum and, together with Ze'ev Ravid, they led the museum's branding campaign. Amichay was a member of the Young & Rubicam creative board for 10 years.

On September 11, 2011, Amichay partnered with Aniboom and initiated a project to honor the upcoming 10th anniversary of September 11 attacks by bringing together animators from all over the world. Amichay envisioned that each participant would create a short animation inspired by the title: 9/11. It had been ten years. One of the videos was made by Amichay himself.

In 2011, Amichay published his first book in Hebrew – "לא, לא, לא, לא, לא, לא, לא, כן" that translates to: "No, No, No, No, No, No, No, Yes", The English edition – "No, No, No, No, No, Yes. Insights From a Creative Journey" was published in the US in January 2014. The book can be found at the MoMA store in New York as well as other venues. In 2016 he published his second book in Hebrew – "נו, נו, נו, נו, נו, נו, נו, יס" – A Creative Journey in New York. In 2021, Amichay published his third book, "אלף בית של גימל" ("Alef bet shel Gimel") – a creative journey in the stations of life. The book was printed and published in Hebrew with two different covers.

In December 2012 Amichay gave a talk as a part of TEDx Jerusalem bearing the same name ("No, No, No, No, No, No, No, Yes")

In 2013, he founded No, No, No, No, No, Yes, a creative boutique in New York, and later moved its office to Tel Aviv. Among its clients are Lion Brand Yarns DOGTV, Mercedes-Benz Israel, Hyundai Israel, and others. In July 2013, the company created a content project for the Hebrew Wikipedia's 10th anniversary, in cooperation with the Hebrew Wikipedia and Channel 2 news – Israeli News Company. In 2016, the agency created The Cyber Horse for The Blavatnik Interdisciplinary Cyber Research Center (ICRC) – Tel Aviv University. The Cyber Horse is a piece of work created with thousands of infected computer and cell phone components. It illustrates the increasing use of malware in making cyberspace a hostile environment. It was created in order to prompt national and international awareness of the dangers of cyber-attacks. The project earned impressions around the world such as CBS NEWS, The Times UK, The Economist, The Telegraph, Le Monde, Der Spiegel)

== Awards and achievements ==
In his position of Chief Creative Officer at Shalmor Avnon Amichay, Amichay led the agency to win many awards, including:

- 19 Cannes Lions awards, the largest number of Cannes Lions awards for an Israeli agency (up to 2012).
- An internet campaign for Danone Strauss, which achieved a record number of votes- approximately 10,000,000, for a campaign voting for the pictures shown on yogurt cups.
- Archive magazine granted the main interview to Amichay in a 2011 edition (11-1).
- The agency won the One Show Silver Pencil Award for the Israel Aids Task Force "Get Tested Project" and is the only Israeli agency that won it (up to 2011).
- The UN granted a special award to the agency for the Israel Aids Task Force SDIA project (2010).
- The agency was awarded the title of agency of the year in the Young and Rubicam worldwide agency (from 184 agencies) and won the Jewel Award.
- The agency won 2nd Media Agency of the Year at the Cannes Lions Festival (2009)
- The agency won the Grand Prix in London International Awards (LIA) (2009) for the radio campaign for the Israel Aids Task Force.
- The agency won the Grand Prix in the New York Festival (1999) for the radio campaign encouraging advertising through the radio.
- The agency won the Gold Clio twice, for "Internet Shutdown Project" (2008), and the Israel Aids Task Force's SDIA Project (2010). The agency is the only Israeli agency that won this award (up to 2011).
- The agency won the Grand Prix in the Golden Drum competition, for the Israel Aids Task Force SDIA project.
- During 2008, the Israeli Marketing Association granted Amichay the title of "Marketing man of the month" in Israel for excellence in marketing Israeli advertising worldwide
- Under his leadership, the Agency won "Agency of the year" many times (2000, 2003, 2005, 2006, and 2007).
- The agency won 20 Effie Awards including a Platinum (2005) & a Grand Effie(2006).
- The first ever Grand Prix at PIAF was awarded to the Get Tested Project.(2011)
- In 2025, the No, No, No, No, No, Yes agency won a Gold Award in Media Innovation category at the Epica Awards for a campaign for Calcalist's AI conference.

== Jury member ==
- Cannes Lions (Direct Lions Jury President)[2012]
- Cresta (Grand Jury President)
- AdPrint
- Clio.
- Eurobest.
- New York Festival.
- Creative Heads.
