= Ohel Shem =

Coordinates: 32°05′47″N 34°49′00″E

Ohel Shem High School

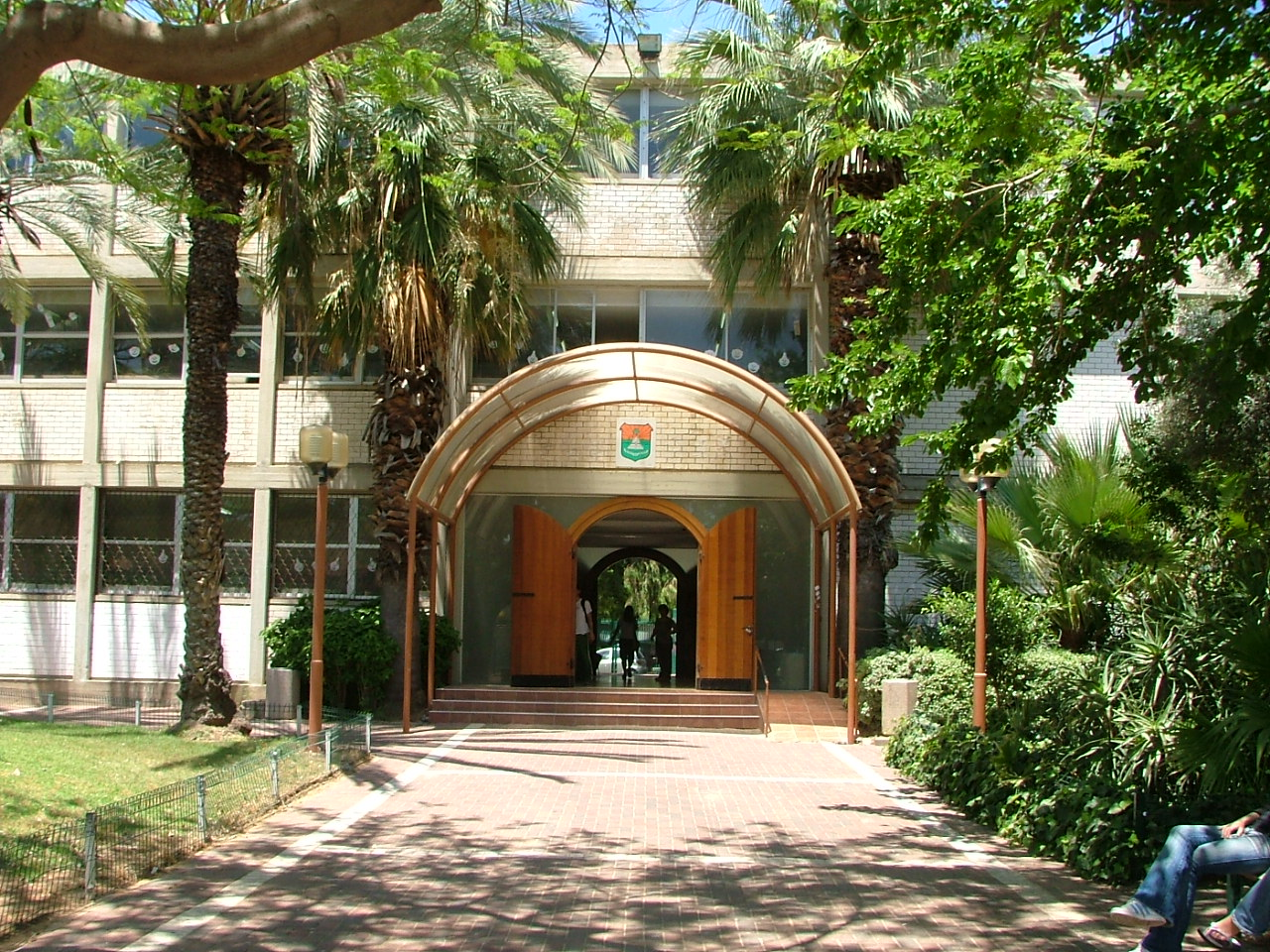
- Ohel Shem high school, the main building

Location
- Rokach 118; Ramat Gan 52111; Israel

Information
- Type: Public secondary school
- Established: 1934
- Principal: Israel Vilozni
- Faculty: Approx. 160
- Grades: 9–12
- Enrollment: Approx. 1550

Ohel Shem (Hebrew: אהל-שם) is an Israeli secular high school located in the Tel Aviv District city of Ramat Gan, Israel. It has about 1,550 students studying in 45 classes, from ninth to twelfth grade, and about 160 teachers and 40 staff.

The campus contains, in addition to the classrooms, a library, a community center (Eshkol Paiss) comprising an auditorium and chemistry, physics, biology, biotechnology and robotics laboratories, a gym, cafeterias, sports fields, lawns and trees.

== Projects ==
The school has a newspaper, "Dugri", a website built by students only, theater productions, a students band, and a teachers band.

The school participates in the MUN project and the WSC.

== History ==
The school was founded as a private institution in 1934 by Alexander Kohler, who also founded the Gymnasia Balfour in Tel Aviv in 1931. Until 1944 Ohel Shem included both primary and secondary education classes.

The school was located in a small building on a hill in Bialik Street until 1961 when it moved to its present location on Smadar Street.

Israel Artzi was the administrator and principal of the school until his death in 1978. Between 1985 and 1978 the principal was Izi Cahane. Between 1989 and 1986 Mira Hemo ran the school followed by David Singer (1995–1990), Adam Kenigsberger (1996–2010). The current principal is Shmuel Keynan (reserve brigadier general, ICT force chief from 2005 to 2008). In September 2005 Adam Kenigsberger was awarded the title of "excelling district principal".

== Attitude towards religious activities ==
The secular Ohel Shem High School has denied its students permission to pray on school premises in the past. However, in 2024, following a student's request, the school principal agreed to open a tefillin stand.

In February 2025, the same student at the school, a youth activist for the right-wing party Otzma Yehudit, decided to open an additional tefillin station at the school, even though he was not permitted to do so. The student was called to clarify with the school principal. During the inquiry, he recorded and edited the school principal without his knowledge and distributed it on TikTok and social media. In the recording, Principal Vilozni was quoted as saying: "In Ohel Shem, tefillin is not allowed," though in reality it was only momentarily. The video also included comments from the same student, in which he accused the principal of being anti-semitic and "worse than the Nazis." The video drew angry responses, and the issue even made the news. Radical right-wing politician Itamar Ben-Gvir praised the boy and even awarded him a certificate. The next day, the student called for a demonstration against what he claimed was discrimination on religious grounds, and hundreds of right-wing activists gathered around the school grounds. Among the activists were criminals who entered the school grounds and recorded and threatened the principal. At the school gates, they blasted music through loudspeakers, filmed videos, distributed merchandise subsidized by Otzma Yehudit, and even held mass prayers. In addition, they sprayed graffiti on the walls with religious sentiments.

== Notable alumni ==
Listed alphabetically by surname.

- Blessing Afrifah (born 2003), Olympic sprinter
- Yosef Ahimeir, Israeli journalist and former politician
- Menahem Ben (1948–2020), journalist
- Amir Eshel, Commander in Chief of the Israeli Air Force
- Yael S. Feldman, Professor Emerita of Hebrew Culture at New York University, NY
- Yoav Gelber, professor of history at the University of Haifa
- Jacob Golomb, professor of philosophy at the Hebrew University of Jerusalem
- Etgar Keret (born 1967), writer
- Uzi Landau, Israeli politician
- Guy Loel, actor
- Dov Moran, engineer, inventor and businessman
- Itamar Rabinovich, Israel's ambassador to the United States from 1993 to 1996
- Judy Shalom Nir-Mozes, socialite
- Gil Shohat, composer, conductor and pianist
- Dov Weissglass (born 1946), lawyer

== Gallery ==
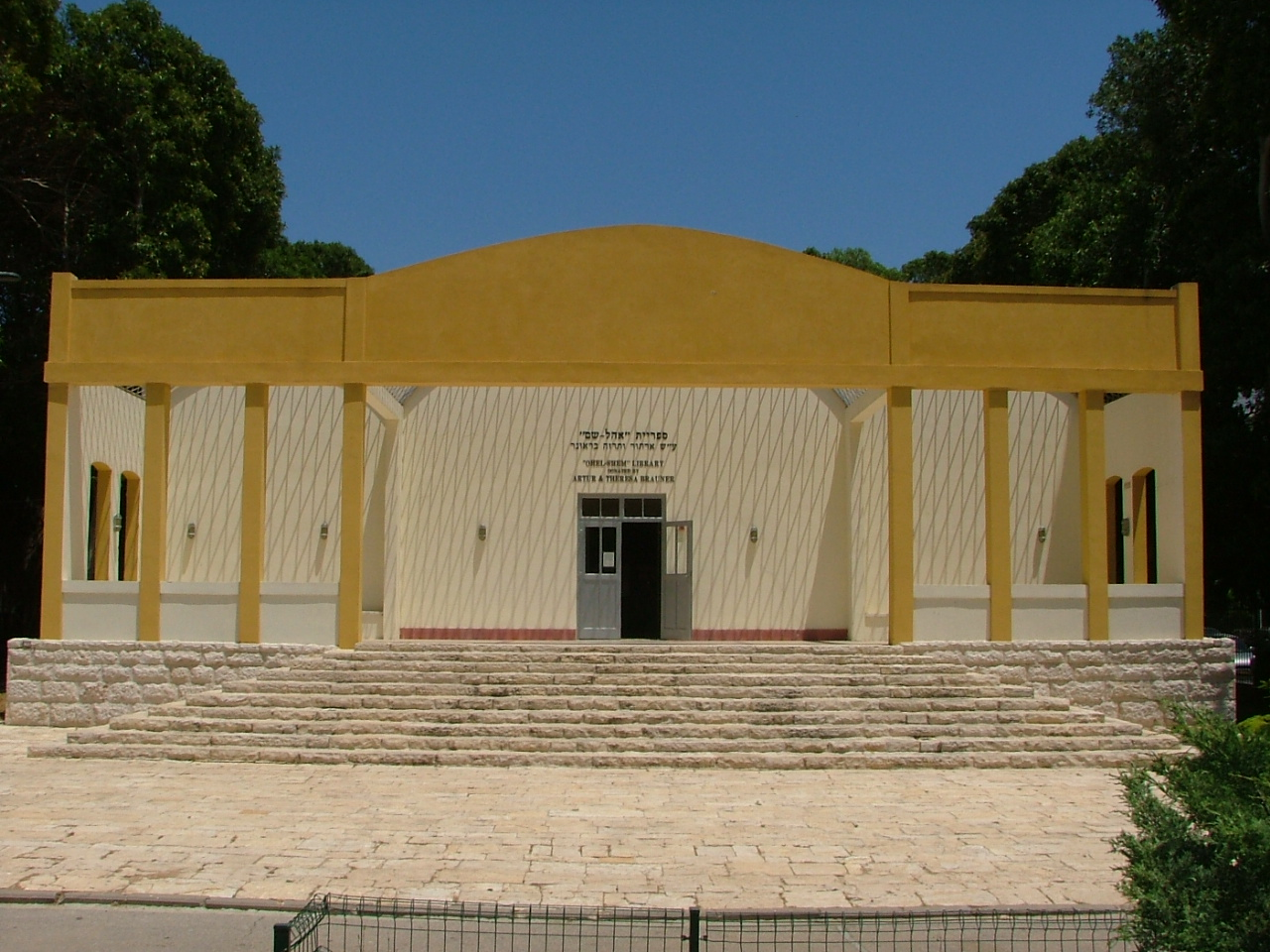
Library of Ohel Shem

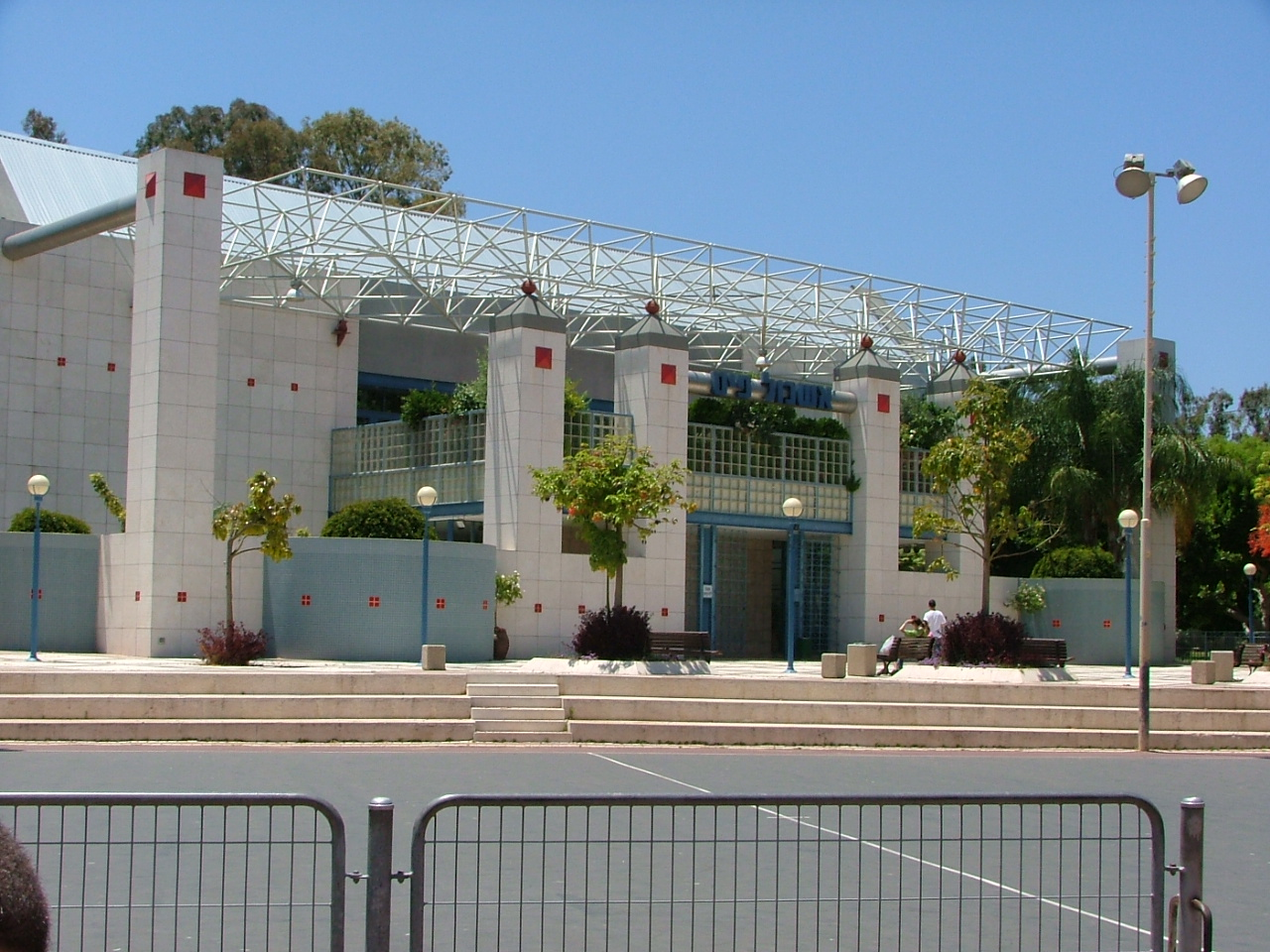
"Eshkol Paiss"
