= Emmanuel Rosen =

Israeli former journalist

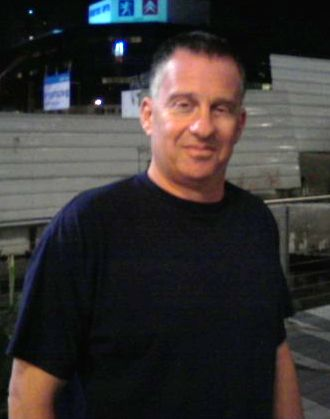
Emmanuel Rosen

Emmanuel Rosen (Hebrew: עמנואל רוזן; born 6 August 1960) is an Israeli journalist, political analyst and media personality. He has worked in radio, television and print media. Following accusations of sexual assault he no longer works in any journalistic capacity.

== Media career ==
Emmanuel Rosen began his journalist career working for Maariv LeNoar, a weekly magazine for young people. During his military service, he was a journalist for "Bamahane" the monthly magazine of the Israel Defense Forces. After the army he worked as an editor at Maariv, and became the newspaper's military commentator in 1987.

In 1993, Rosen moved into television, joining Channel 2 news as a diplomatic commentator and reporter. He moved to the new Channel 10 in 2002, where he was given his own debriefing program Ze HaZman (It's the Time). In 2006 he returned to Channel 2. Since February 2007, he has been presenting Bottom Line with Ben Caspit and Dana Weiss. In 2008, he hosted Black Box with Anat Goren.

In parallel to his work on television, Rosen also works on a satirical radio program with Danny Sides, Finish and Go on Tel Aviv Radio.

In September 2006, Rosen gave lectures on media and journalism at University of Mumbai, St. Xavier's College, St. Xavier Institute of Communication, Sophia College of Media, HR College of Commerce and Economics, and University of Pune.
