= Greek island affair =

Israeli political scandal

The Greek island affair (Hebrew: פרשת האי היווני, romanized: Parashat HaEe HaYevani) was an Israeli political scandal involving David Appel, Ariel Sharon, at the time a minister in the Likud party, and others close to Sharon. The scandal consisted of charges, later dropped, that Appel had obtained favourable treatment from Sharon and his allies, which would help him and his fellow investors purchase the small rocky island of Patroklos at the tip of Attica, in the town of Palaia Fokaia, for building a multimillion-dollar resort complex. The project was illegally obstructed.

While Ariel Sharon was Foreign Minister under Prime Minister Benjamin Netanyahu in 1999, the indictment asserted, Appel contracted to pay Gilad Sharon, Ariel's son, then 30 years old and a business novice, US$20,000 a month as a business consultant to Appel's development project. It was reported that Gilad may have received up to 3 million euros, had the project been successful.

Israeli prosecutors argued that Appel signed the contract with Gilad Sharon in order to secure his father's help in facilitating the resort project. Sharon later hosted the deputy foreign minister of Greece during his visit to Israel. The indictment also charged that Appel had assisted Ehud Olmert's campaign for mayor of Jerusalem.

On June 14, 2004 Israel's Attorney General Menachem Mazuz decided to close the case without criminal proceedings because of lack of evidence. The land deal was actually negotiated before Sharon was Foreign Minister, and Sharon had voted against Appel's interests when he was Housing Minister in an earlier government. Mazuz also commented negatively on the prosecution: "There was a goal at the outset which influenced the decision-making process."
