= Bamahane =

Israeli military magazine (1934–2020)

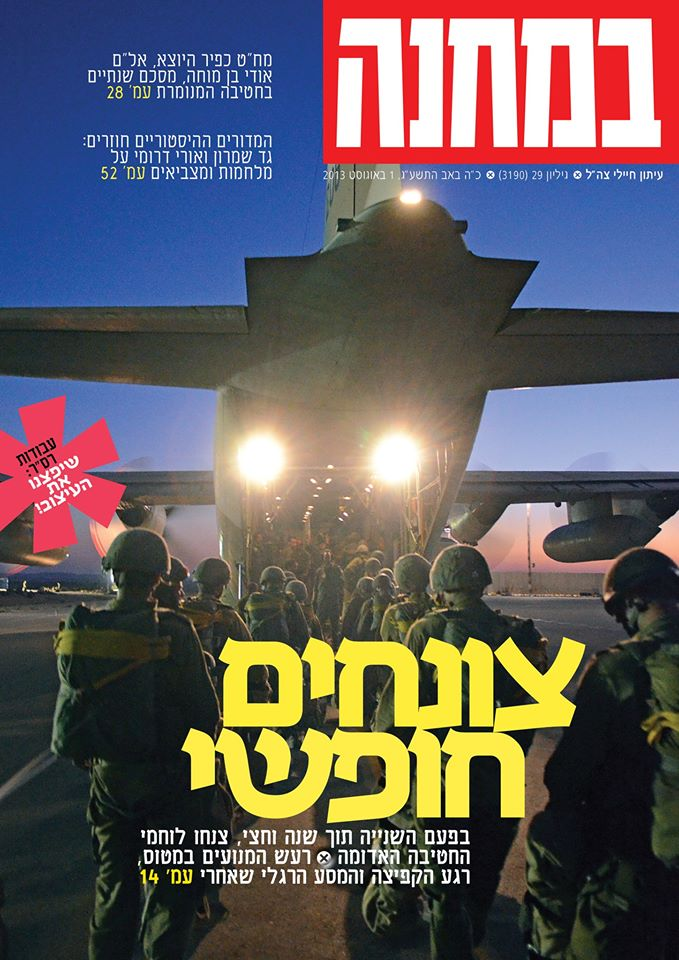
Front page of the 1 August 2013 issue

Bamahane (also BaMahane, Hebrew: במחנה, lit. in the base camp) was a Hebrew-language weekly magazine published by the Israel Defense Forces. It was first published in December 1934 by the Haganah and was published as a weekly until December 2016, when it was moved online until it was formally merged into the IDF's website in January 2020.

== History ==
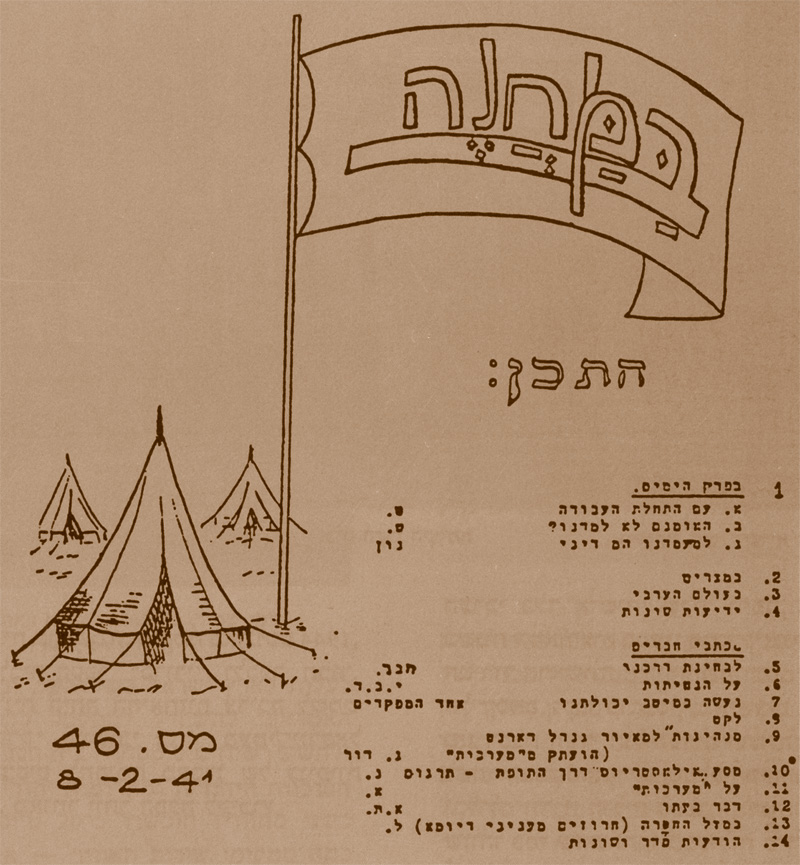
Bamahane 1941 clandestine newspaper, Haganah archive

Bamahane started in December 1934 as an underground publication by the Tel Aviv office of the Haganah. Its chief editor, until 1947, was Ephraim Talmi. Notable writers, such as Nathan Alterman and Leah Goldberg, wrote for it. At the end of 1947 it became the Haganah's national publication. During that time period, Moshe Shamir became its chief editor. With the founding of the IDF, Bamahane became the soldiers' newspaper.

Between 2000 and 2005, Bamahane consisted of 2 parts: one including news articles related to military and security matters, and the other containing editorials, interviews, photo-ops, etc. From January 2006 until December 2016, it was one publication in the form of a 68-page magazine.

While Bamahane was subordinate to the IDF's Education and Youth Corps, it is unusually independent, and until 2006, was not censored by the IDF Spokesman. As such, its content was the center of several controversies, to the extent that in May 2001, the head of the Education Corps, Brigadier General Elazar Stern, decided to close the publication, an order which did not come to pass.

Bamahane's circulation was in the tens of thousands, mainly read by soldiers who receive the magazine in their bases on Thursdays. Additionally, many Israeli civilians close to the IDF choose to subscribe to the publication.

Bamahane's final chief editor (from 2013–2016) was Tzachi Biran. Additionally, Bamahane employed about 20 writers. the editor before Tzachi was Yoni Shanfeld.

== Controversies ==
In May 2001, the commander of the Education Corps at the time, Elazar Stern, ordered the closure of Bamahane, due to 'questionable material', including a front-page article about a homosexual colonel. Due to public outrage and an appeal to Defense Minister Binyamin Ben-Eliezer, Bamahane continued to exist.

In September 2005, 3 of Bamahane's writers were dismissed for not following a prohibition from the IDF Spokesperson's Unit to document and publish stories and photographs of the relocation of Jewish graves from Gush Katif into Israel proper. As a result of this and other incidents, in January 2006, the head of the Manpower Directorate, now Major General Elazar Stern, ordered each piece in the magazine to undergo careful inspection by the spokesperson's unit. Bamahane's staff accused him of attempting to turn the publication into another Pravda.

== Notable writers ==
- Ehud Olmert, politician and prime minister
- Nisim Aloni, playwright
- Eli Mohar, songwriter
- Eitan Haber, journalist
- Tzachi Hanegbi, politician
- Yair Lapid, journalist, TV personality, politician and prime minister
- Ram Oren, author
- Imanuel Rosen, journalist and TV personality
- Renen Schorr, film director
- Nathan Alterman, poet
- Dov Elbaum, writer and lecturer
- Yoram Taharlev
