= Yedioth Ahronoth =

Israeli daily newspaper

- Front page dated 31 March 1940
- Type: Daily newspaper
- Format: Tabloid
- Owner: Yedioth Ahronoth Group
- Founder: Gershom Komarov
- Publisher: Arnon Mozes
- Editor: Neta Livne
- Founded: 11 December 1939
- Language: Hebrew, English, Spanish
- Headquarters: 138 Begin Rd., Tel Aviv, Israel
- Country: Israel
- Circulation: 300,000 weekdays 600,000 weekends
- Sister newspapers: Calcalist
- Website: yediot.co.il yediot.com ynetespanol.com

Yedioth Ahronoth (Hebrew: יְדִיעוֹת אַחֲרוֹנוֹת, pronounced [jediˈ(ʔ)ot aχ(a)ʁoˈnot]; lit. "Latest News") is an Israeli daily mass market newspaper published in Tel Aviv. Founded in 1939, Yedioth Ahronoth is Israel's largest paid newspaper by sales and circulation and has been described as "undoubtedly the country's number-one paper." It is published in the tabloid format.

It is known as centrist, compared to the left-leaning newspaper of record Haaretz and the right-leaning free daily Israel Hayom.

== History ==
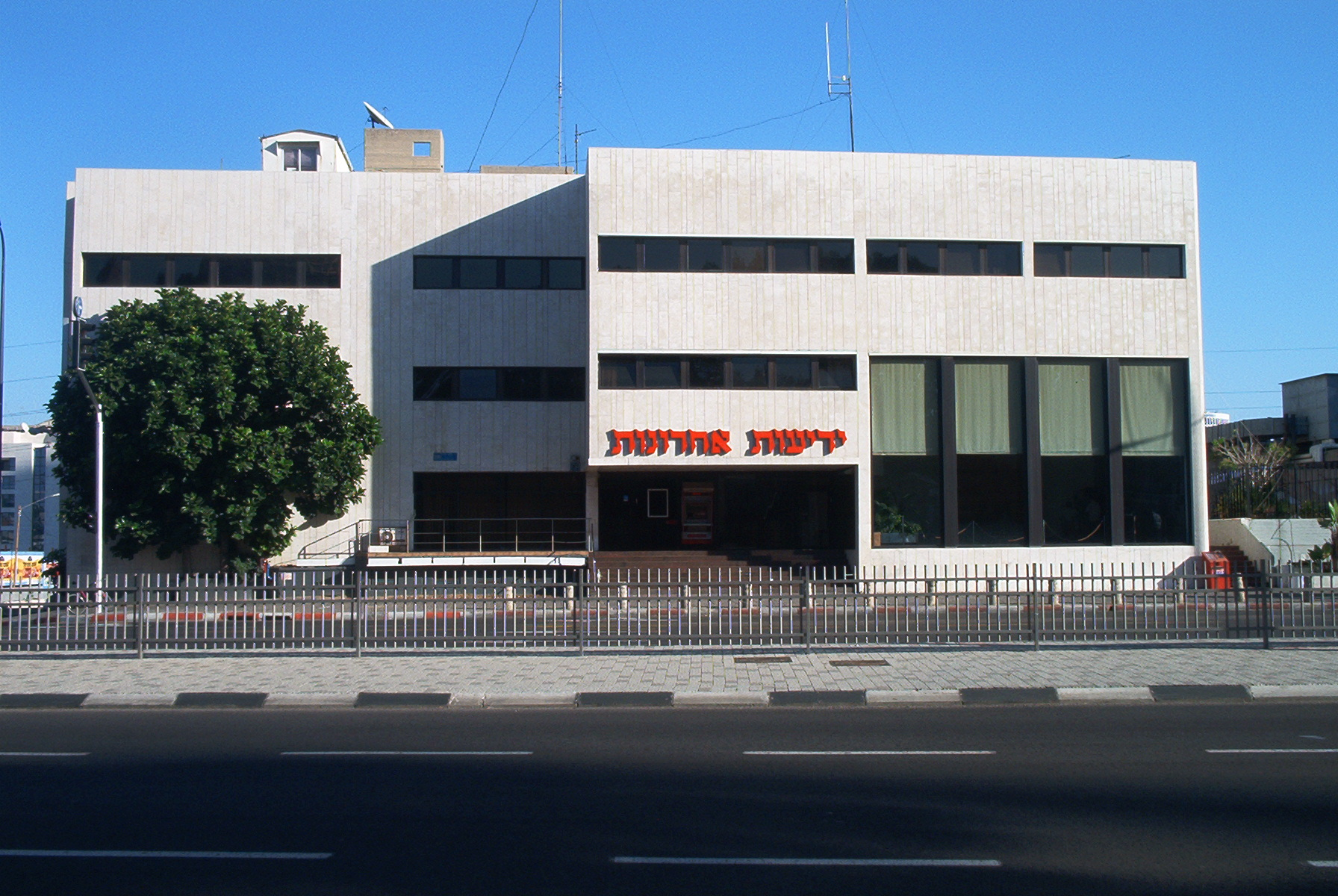
Yedioth Ahronoth's former headquarters in Tel Aviv

=== 1939–1948: Foundation and expansion ===
Yedioth Ahronoth was established in 1939 by an investor named Gershom Komarov. It was the first evening paper in Mandatory Palestine, and attempted to emulate the format of the London Evening Standard. Running into financial difficulties, Komarov sold the paper to Yehuda Mozes, a wealthy land dealer who regarded the paper as an interesting hobby and a long-term financial investment. His sons Reuben and Noah ran the paper, with Noah as the first managing editor.

=== 1948–1984: In competition with Maariv ===
In 1948, a large group of journalists and staff members led by chief editor Ezriel Carlebach left to form Yedioth Maariv, shortly later known as Maariv. According to Carlebach and his associates, their reason for leaving Yedioth Ahronoth was Mozes' interference in their editorial decisions. He was replaced as chief editor by Herzl Rosenblum. Carelbach is considered the most prominent journalist of his era and his and his associates' departure from Yedioth is commonly known in Israeli media history as "The Putsch", or the coup. This began an ongoing battle for circulation and prestige between the rival newspapers, which peaked during the 1990s when both papers were discovered to have bugged one another's phones. In the first decades following Carlebach's departure, Maariv's circulation greatly outnumbered Yedioth's although over the years Yedioth's readership grew steadily and by the early 1980s its circulation eclipsed Maariv's and made it the country's largest newspaper. This success was in large part thanks to the efforts of Dov Yudkovski, a distant cousin of Mozes and Holocaust survivor who joined Yedioth following "the Putsch" in 1948, serving as editorial manager between 1953 and 1986, and chief editor between 1986 and 1989. Although officially Rosenblum held the title of chief editor between 1948 and 1986, his duties only extended to writing the paper's leading editorial article while Yudkovski acted as chief editor in practice.

=== 1984–1993: In competition with Hadashot ===
On 4 March 1984, a new competitor to Yediot Ahronoth was established, the Hadashot newspaper founded by Amos Schocken. Hadashot featured a large color headline and color pages, and used more innovative and less formal language. Its main target audience were the readers of Yediot Ahronot, a situation that required Yediot Ahronot to react in order to maintain its readers and market position. Yediot editor Moshe Vardi, together with Noni Mozes, led the transition of the newspaper to printing in color. Zeev Galili, appointed head of reporters, recruited a series of freelance reporters from other newspapers, and worked to improve the newspaper's ability to obtain scoops. The changes in Yediot Ahronot paid off, and Hadashot was forced to close after nine years of activity, after heavy losses for the Schocken family.

=== 1993–2007: The Newspaper of the Nation ===
For his achievements, Yudkovski was awarded the Sokolov Prize for Journalism in 2000 and the 2002 Israel Prize in Communications. Moshe Vardi was replaced as editor in 2005 by Rafi Ginat. Shilo De-Beer was promoted to editor in April 2007.

Mistakes did happen over the years. For example, in 2003, the co-founder of Aswat, an organization supporting lesbian Palestinian women, was outed by the Yedioth Ahronoth after agreeing to an interview, despite asking for her sexual orientation not be included in the article.

In 2006, Yedioth Ahronoth was the most widely-read newspaper among both native Hebrew and Arabic speakers.

=== Since 2007: In competition with Israel Hayom ===
In 2007, Israel Hayom, a free newspaper owned by the family of casino mogul Sheldon Adelson, was launched. By July 2010, Israel Hayom had overtaken Yedioth Ahronoth as the most read newspaper in terms of exposure with a rate of 35.2% compared to Yedioth's 34.9%.

De-Beer was replaced as editor by Ron Yaron in 2011. As of 2017, the paper is headed by Noah Mozes's son, Arnon Mozes. In January 2017, secret recordings were released of conversations between Prime Minister Benjamin Netanyahu and Mozes discussing a potential deal in which the newspaper would provide better coverage of Netanyahu in exchange for the government limiting the circulation of competitor Israel Hayom. This led to the opening of "Case 2000" corruption investigation against Netanyahu.

As of 31 July 2023, a TGI survey indicated that Israel Hayom, distributed for free, is Israel's most read newspaper, with a 29.4% weekday readership exposure, followed by Yedioth Ahronoth, with 22.3%, Haaretz with 4.8%, Globes with 4% and Maariv with 3.9%.

== Yedioth Ahronoth Group ==
The newspaper is owned by the Yedioth Ahronoth Group, which also owns shares in several Israeli mass media companies, including "Channel 2", a commercial television channel; "Hot", the national cable TV company; "Yedioth Tikshoret", a group of weekly local newspapers; Vesti, a Russian language newspaper; magazines, such as the weekly TV guide magazine Pnai Plus and weekly women's magazine La'Isha; book publisher "Yedioth Books", and other non-media companies.

== Ynet ==
Ynet

- Screenshot Screenshot of Ynet on 25 June 2025
- Website type: Online newspaper
- Founded: 2000; 26 years ago
- Headquarters: Rishon LeZion, Israel
- Key people: Gido Ran (editor in chief); Shay Magal (CEO)
- Industry: News, Internet portal
- Parent: Yedioth Ahronoth
- Divisions: Ynet Global
- Website: www.ynet.co.il

Ynet (stylized in all lowercase as ynet) is an Israeli news and general-content website, and the online outlet for Yedioth Ahronoth. Ynet launched on June 6, 2000, in Hebrew, following other Hebrew outlets' website launches including Haaretz, Maariv and Globes. According to Globes, the launch of Ynet may have been delayed due to concerns about Ynet cannibalizing the Yedioth Ahronoth newspaper. The website had 130 staff members at launch, and the original columnists included Ofer Shelah and Gadi Taub. Its content is separate from the newspaper.

In addition, Ynet hosts the online version of Yedioth Aharanot's media group magazines: Lalsha (which also operates Ynet's fashion section), Pnai Plus, Blazer, GO Magazine, and Mentha. For two years, Ynet also had an Arabic edition, which ceased operation in May 2005. Ynet's main competition comes from Walla! and Mako. Since 2008, Ynet is Israel's most popular internet portal, as measured by Google Trends.

In celebration of Israel's independence day in 2005, Ynet conducted a poll to determine whom Ynet readers consider to be the greatest Israelis of all time. The top 200 results were published, with Yitzhak Rabin placing first in the survey, and David Ben-Gurion placing second.

In 2005, Ynet employed 80 reporters. In 2023, the Yedioth Ahronoth group employed a total of approximately 530 people.

=== Ynet Global ===

Ynet Global, formerly Ynet News (stylised as Ynetnews), is the English language website associated with Yedioth Ahronoth and the Hebrew Ynet. Ynet News was established in February 2005 in Tel Aviv, with a staff of nine people. According to Gadi Taub of Hebrew University of Jerusalem, the launch of Ynet News was a major event in English-language media in Israel. The founding editor of Ynet News, Alan Abbey, planned to focus on American Jews as an audience. Abbey left in the summer of 2005 to serve as Internet Director for Shalom Hartman Institute in Jerusalem. In September 2025, Ynet News rebranded as Ynet Global reflecting an expansion in scope.

According to a 2018 study published by Oxford University Press, Ynet publishes articles and interviews at the instigation of the Israeli government, without declaring any connection with the government – these publications aim to stir up pro-Israeli sentiment.

== Yedioth Books ==
Yedioth Books, formerly Miskal, is one of Israel's three leading book publishers, publishing annually roughly 300 fiction, nonfiction and youth titles, both original and translated.

Its list of Hebrew authors includes Eyal Meged, Ephraim Kishon, Assaf Inbari, Yoram Kenyuk, Haviva Pedaya, Smadar Shir, Amotz Asa-El, Ben Caspit, Yair Lapid, Ehud Olmert and Moshe Yaalon. Its translated authors include J.K. Rowling, Harlan Coben, Hans Fallada, and J.R.R. Tolkien.

Yedioth Books' series "People of the Book" published 24 monumental works of Jewish literature, ranging from the Dead Sea Scrolls, the Babylonian Talmud and medieval mystics to the writings of Moses Maimonides, S.Y. Agnon, Leah Goldberg and Theodor Herzl.

Founded in 1995 as a merger between Yedioth Ahronoth and book publisher Hemed, Yedioth Books has been headed since its foundation by CEO Dovi Eichenwald. The company's chief operating officer is Eyal Dadush.

== Positions and reputation ==
Yedioth Ahronoth has been described as the most important media organization in Israel, known for its ability to capture the voice of the average middle class Israeli. The paper describes itself as "The Newspaper of the Nation" and generally offers editorial space to views across the Israeli political spectrum.

The Forward described Yedioth Ahronoth as centrist compared to right-leaning Ma'ariv and left-leaning Ha'aretz. Political scientist Guy Grossman described it as relatively mainstream and centrist. Progressive Israeli journalist Noam Sheizaf described it as fairly centrist and slightly more liberal than tabloid papers Israel Hayom and Ma'ariv.

Yedioth Ahronoth is frequently critical of Benjamin Netanyahu, which progressive Israeli journalist Noam Sheizaf attributed to the launch of Israel Hayom in 2009. A study conducted by Moran Rada with the Israeli Democracy Institute showed that Yedioth's coverage of the 2009 Israeli legislative election was biased in favor of Kadima and its leader Tzipi Livni in most editorial decisions, and that the paper chose to play down events that did not help to promote a positive image for her, while on the other hand, touting and inflating events that helped promote Livni and her party. Oren Frisco reached a similar conclusion after the 2009 elections, writing that throughout the campaign, Yedioth Ahronoth was biased against Netanyahu.

According to commination professor Gadi Wolfsfeld, its marketing strategy emphasizes "drama and human interest over sophisticated analysis."

== See also ==
- List of newspapers in Israel
- Mass media in Israel
