= Israeli public diplomacy in the Gaza war =

Israeli state and citizen advocacy and justification efforts

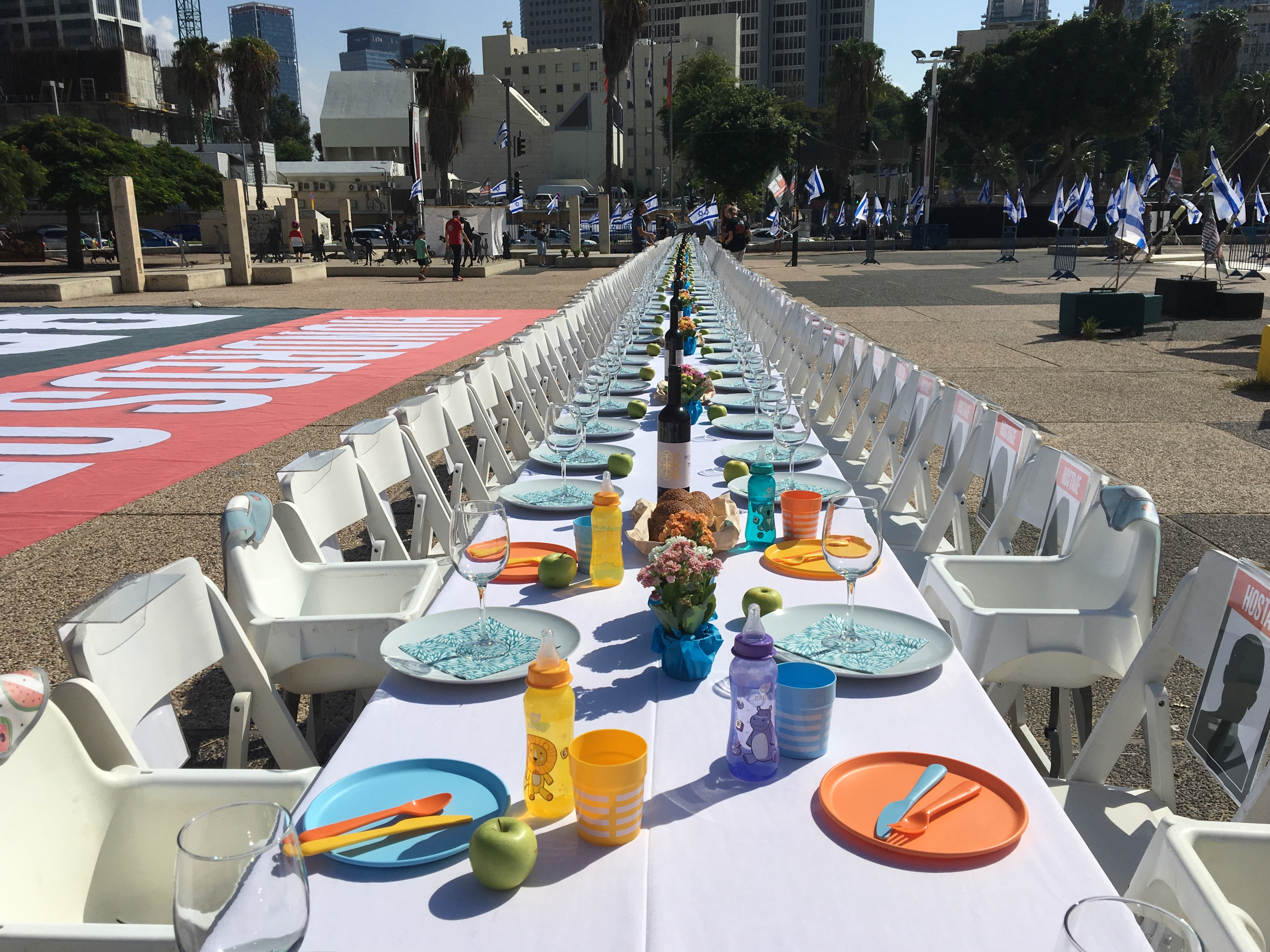
A "Shabbat Dinner" table at the Tel Aviv Museum of Art plaza, with more than 200 empty seats, representing the hostages and missing held in Gaza.

Israeli public diplomacy in the Gaza war refers to the Israeli effort towards bringing more favor of global public opinion to Israel and its actions during the Gaza war.

These efforts take place in the context that a week after the outbreak of the war following the 7 October 2023 surprise attack on Israel, the Israeli Ministry of Information was closed and the office's resources were transferred to the new Rebirth Administration. The role of explaining Israel's actions has been the responsibility of the Ministry of Foreign Affairs since then.

On the public side, the Israeli home front also conducts outreach activities, mainly on social networks, in addition to famous personalities and former politicians defending Israel, especially on world television. Prominent leaders in the world, especially in the West such as Germany, the Netherlands, France, the United Kingdom, and especially the United States, expressed support for Israel, and even visited the nation during conflict.

In the spring of 2026, Israel quintupled its public relations budget, allocating roughly US$730 million to improve its image internationally.

== Challenges ==
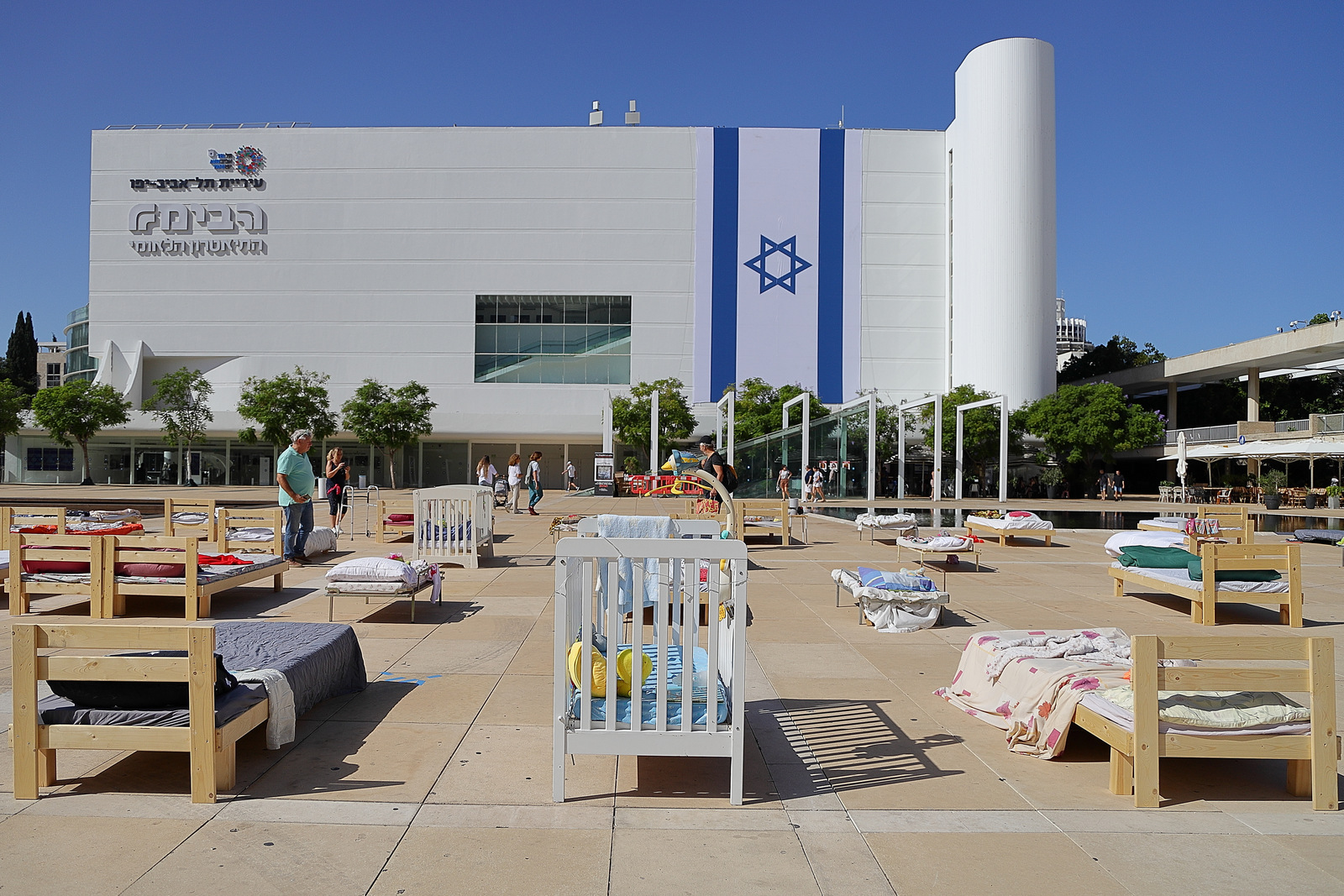
The "Empty Beds" installation in Habima Square (Culture Square) in Tel Aviv, where empty beds are displayed, and in particular children's beds and cribs, which represent the abductees.

Israeli public diplomacy, sometimes referred to as "hasbara" (Hebrew: הסברה, romanized: Hasbará, roughly translating to "explaining") though in recent times, Israel has shifted away from this terminology toward calling its efforts "public diplomacy", faces a number of difficulties.

Even before the war, there were groups of anti-Zionists in the United States and Europe, more commonly found among progressive and more radical left-wing organizations and activists. Through activism focusing on intersectionality, uniting struggles across disparate races, ethnicities, genders, and sexualities, the Palestinian struggle has been frequently linked to other struggles such as that of the LGBTQ+ community and African-Americans in the United States. These associations gave legitimacy to Palestinians as a persecuted group requiring public activism for support, which in turn caused pro-Palestinian and anti-Israel bodies in United States universities to grow in size and influence. Examples of these groups include the Boycott, Divestment and Sanctions movement, Students for Justice in Palestine (SJP), and Jewish Voice for Peace (JVP). Several elite universities, such as Harvard University, have also supported Palestinians, often with rhetoric regarding colonialism and imperialism. Instances of antisemitism have occurred within anti-Zionist activism despite efforts among some groups to prevent this.

The 7 October attack on Israel and the subsequent Gaza war posed new challenges to Israeli public diplomacy:

- Bringing awareness of massacres and kidnappings that occurred in the surprise attack, carried out by fighters involved with Hamas and the Palestinian Islamic Jihad, to the world public.
- Justification for the extensive damage caused in the Gaza Strip during the war, which in addition to harming Hamas infrastructure and troops, included killing tens of thousands of civilians, extensive destruction of homes and infrastructure, turning hundreds of thousands of Palestinians into refugees, and creating mass starvation. The images of widespread damage in Gaza increased sympathy for Palestinians.
- Bringing to the public's attention the fate of the abductees from Israel to the Gaza Strip, both those who were released and those who've remained within alleged terrorist networks.
- Dealing with both resent & past statements by Israeli politicians that are seen to permit widespread harm to civilians in the Gaza Strip and in cases, judged as genocidal by several governments and organizations. Such statements include:
  - Israeli Prime Minister Benjamin Netanyahu, who described the war as "a war between the sons of light and the sons of darkness" and said that "the memory of Amalek must be wiped out";
  - President Isaac Herzog, who stated that "it is an entire nation there that is responsible. The talk about unaware and involved citizens is not true";
  - Defense Minister Yoav Gallant, who said that "Gaza will not return to what it was. Everything will be eliminated [...] I released all restraints";
  - Minister of National Security Itamar Ben-Gvir, who said: "When we say we want to destroy Hamas, we also mean those who celebrated, supported and distributed sweets - they are all terrorists and they too must be destroyed";
  - Agriculture Minister Avi Dichter, who announced "This is Nakba Gaza 2023".
  - Heritage Minister Amichai Eliyahu, in his remarks regarding the dropping of an atomic bomb on Gaza,
  - The statement made by some politicians according to which there are "no non-involved" in Gaza.

== Media bias ==
Foreign media outlets such as the BBC have been accused by Israel and Israel-supportive figures of pro-Palestinian bias, with sources outside Israel reporting a pro-Israel bias in Western media.

== Advocacy by the State of Israel ==
=== Ministry of Information ===
About a week after the outbreak of the war, the Israeli Ministry of Information was closed. The minister heading it, Galit Distel-Atbarian, was quoted as saying that "the Ministry of Information has been emptied of powers and is a waste of public money, and cannot make a significant contribution to the country".

=== Ministry of Foreign Affairs and IDF spokespeople ===
On 10 October 2023, three days after the start of the Gaza war and genocide, Foreign Minister Eli Cohen recruited a team of ten influential Israelis to advocate for Israel online during the war. The team included: Arsen Ostrovsky, Noa Tishby, Hen Mazzig, Tali Eshkoli, Michael Dickson, Joe Zevuloni, Natalie Dodon, Emily Schrader, Michal Cotler-Wunsh, and Fleur Hassan‑Nahoum.

By October 20, more than a billion exposures to content released by the Israeli Ministry of Foreign Affairs were registered, some of them in Arabic and Persian. The IDF also has a partnership in the effort, when a video of horrors "through the eyes of Hamas " published by an IDF spokesperson received six million views on its first day of posting. The IDF published many additional videos and investigations. Both the IDF and the Foreign Ministry censored very little in order to cause shock to global viewers in order to prompt them to support Israel. The Ministry of Foreign Affairs screened the film documenting the atrocities of Hamas in dozens of Israeli embassies around the world, and continues to do so.

IDF spokesman Brigadier General Daniel Hagari held a daily briefing for the media, usually in Hebrew and sometimes in English when he presented important information. As the war progressed, the IDF spokesman disclosed intelligence information and evidence obtained by the fighters and the operational documentation unit in the field that included several reports and claims of Hamas using civilians and civilian infrastructure as human shields. This included videos purporting to show Hamas' use of hospitals for military purposes, and in particular the Shifa Hospital, including Israeli statements of it hosting underground headquarters.

The supervisor of the international department in Dover was Lt. Col. Richard Hecht. Under him, Lt. Col. Peter Lerner served in the reserves for many months of the war. After his release from the reserves, Lerner criticized the performance of the Israeli government in the matter of how it presented information.

=== Israeli President ===
On October 15, in an interview with CNN, President Isaac Herzog showcased the document "The Captive Kidnapping Plan", stated to have been found on the body of a Hamas fighter, which details instructions on how to act when kidnapping the hostages. The writing describes that the kidnappers should create chaos, to intimidate captives through coercion, blindfolds, and electric shocks, and to execute anyone who may pose a threat or distraction. Kidnappers were also instructed to use the captives as human shields if necessary. Herzog also said that fighters were required to document their actions live, and to execute the captives during IDF attacks, comparing these methods to the UN-designated terrorist organization, ISIS.

Israeli security forces described a detained fighter's confession, saying that the Hamas leadership had promised them an apartment and ten thousand dollars to whoever would bring a hostage from Gaza, including the elderly, women, and children.

In an interview with the BBC on November 11, President Herzog claimed to have obtained an Arabic copy of Adolf Hitler's Mein Kampf from Gaza. IDF soldiers reported finding it in a children's room in Gaza, used as a base by Hamas fighters. The contents of the book included notes in Arabic written in marker. Marc Owen Jones, an associate professor at Hamad Bin Khalifa University, characterized the supposed finding of Mein Kampf in Gaza as "an attempt to bolster the narrative that Palestinian children are being filled with hate, are beyond redemption and are thus valid targets for killing."

On November 14, President Herzog gave a speech at the Western Wall that was broadcast live to a pro-Israel demonstration in Washington, D.C., where about half a million people participated.

On November 27, President Herzog took German President Frank-Walter Steinmeier on a tour of Kibbutz Bari, which was severely damaged in the initial attack by Hamas. Steinmeier promised that his country would contribute 7 million euros to the restoration of the Bari Gallery.

=== Ambassador of Israel to the UN ===
On October 26, in a speech to the UN General Assembly, Gilad Erdan, Israel's ambassador to the UN, presented a photo of a paramedic's burned body who was murdered in Kibbutz Ari. In his speech, he said: "It's not Auschwitz, it's Hamas". In addition, members of the Israeli delegation distributed to those present in the hall pages with a QR code to scan where they could view the atrocities that occurred on October 7.

On October 27, the Israeli Consulate in New York screened a film documenting the atrocities committed by Hamas in front of more than 20 presidents of media organizations, presenters, and senior journalists from the New York Times and the Wall Street Journal in addition to the media networks ABC, NBC, CBS, and CNN. At the end of the screening, Ambassador Gilad Erdan gave a briefing to the journalists.

On October 31, Ambassador Erdan and members of his delegation wore yellow badge to the United Nations Security Council to protest the discourse against Israel. Senior officials at the Israeli Ministry of Foreign Affairs and Yad Vashem chairman, Dani Dayan condemned the action, with Dayan stating: "This act humiliates both the victims of the Holocaust and the State of Israel."

On November 20, a screening was held at the UN headquarters in New York showing footage of the attack on October 7. The film was shown to UN ambassadors, senior UN officials, and representatives of the New York Jewish community. The UN Secretary General was not present at the screening, despite his presence being ordered by Erdan personally. At the beginning of the screening, Erdan said: "What is the point of the existence of the United Nations if, on International Children's Day, all discussions do not open with condemnation of Hamas, which is committing one of the most serious war crimes in history?".

On December 4, an event was held at the UN headquarters in New York, protesting the UN's response to allegations of rape and sexual violence committed by Hamas. Testimonies, video evidence of the attack, and speeches, including a video speech by Hillary Clinton were shown. Ambassador Erdan condemned the neglect shown towards Jewish women by the UN and women's organizations around the world. The event was organized by Israel's ambassador to the United Nations in partnership with the National Council of Jewish Women in the United States (NCJW), the World Zionist Organization, the Hadassah Zionist Organization, and the Shusterman Foundation.

=== Israeli Prime Minister ===
Israeli Prime Minister Benjamin Netanyahu spoke with many world leaders to mobilize international support for Israel and was in frequent contact with United States President Joe Biden. In addition, Netanyahu often gave interviews to foreign media networks to explain Israel's position and justify conflict and severe actions in the Gaza Strip. On November 27, Netanyahu hosted Elon Musk - one of the richest people in the world and the owner of the social network X (Twitter) - and gave him a tour of Gaza City, which was severely damaged following October 7, and showed him the horror film documenting the war crimes committed by Hamas. Afterwards, Musk met with President Isaac Herzog, Speaker of the Knesset Amir Ohana, and Minister Benny Gantz.

==== Netanyahu's "Poison Machine" ====
"The Poison Machine" was the name given to Netanyahu's (unauthorised) personal propaganda team by Israeli media, and the opposition. Their efforts targeted Israeli audiences as well as the outside world.

=== "72 Virgins – Uncensored" ===
A public diplomacy effort by the Israeli military, the "72 Virgins – Uncensored" Telegram channel, starting on October 9, 2023, shared graphic images and videos of Palestinians taken in Gaza. The channel originally presented itself as independent, but due to its privileged access to videos and images taken by soldiers, it was discovered to be run by the psychological warfare division of the IDF. The channel was shut down for operating against policy by targeting Israelis, with the unit's usual role being to target enemy and other international audiences. The Wire described the channel as "racist", for using language like, "Roaches to Be Exterminated".

=== College campuses ===
Gideon Saar, Israel's Foreign Minister, released a statement in December 2024, that highlighted a planned emphasis on American college campuses, which have experienced significant pro-Palestinian protests since the war began following the October 7 attacks. The statement emphasized that this initiative will be undertaken in collaboration with American Jewish groups and in coordination with similar efforts by the Diaspora Affairs Ministry.

Saar told the Israeli newspaper Maariv, "Israel's hasbara efforts and consciousness warfare have for decades not received the critical and life-saving resources and tools they require. I am determined to make a change. Every shekel devoted to this cause is an investment, not an expense, and will strengthen Israel and its standing in the world."

According to Jewish Insider, Saar and his team have been conducting brainstorming sessions with a diverse range of individuals and groups engaged in pro-Israel advocacy worldwide. These participants include social media influencers, cultural figures, professional hasbara advocates, and representatives of various Jewish organizations.

=== Online initiatives ===
In January 2024, Haaretz reported that Israel had purchased a technological system with the ability to conduct mass online influence campaigns and create content aimed at specific audiences. According to Haaretz's sources, the system is aimed at countering an online "hate machine" that is "systematically pushing out anti-Israeli and pro-Hamas disinformation, misinformation, October 7 denialism, as well as blatantly antisemitic content."

In January 2025, a generative AI social media bot named FactFinderAI, which was developed to promote pro-Israel narratives online, was instead found to be promoting anti-Israel content. FactFinderAI denounced IDF soldiers as "white colonizers in apartheid Israel", expressed support for the recognition of a Palestinian state and derided Antony Blinken as having "caused immense suffering and devastation in Gaza". The bot also engaged in misinformation, such as denying the killing of an Israeli family during the October 7 attacks. According to Haaretz, it was unclear if the bot was "linked to any officially funded project or if it was just developed independently by tech savvy pro-Israel activists."

==== 'Esther Project' Israeli influencer network ====
News outlets reported that Israel is paying US influencers to improve its public image on Instagram, TikTok, and other social media platforms by paying them to post content. Records filed with the US Department of Justice, as required by the Foreign Agents Registration Act, show that the Israeli government is funding a clandestine political messaging campaign in the US, including influencer campaigning and more traditional big-budget political campaigning, to "assist with promoting cultural interchange between the United States and Israel." The campaign includes up to US$900,000 in payments and comes amid Israel's contract with AI-driven political campaign firm Clock Tower X and Brad Parscale, former campaign manager of Donald Trump, worth US$1.5 million per month.

According to the DOJ filings, the firm responsible for Israel's influencer network, Bridges Partners was established in June 2025 Delaware by Israeli consultants Uri Steinberg and Yair Levi. The firm then received about $200,000 to recruit social media influencers based in the US. The arrangement went through the German division of the global public relations firm Havas.

In a meeting with influencers in New York, Netanyahu said, "We have to fight with the weapons that apply to the battlefields in which we engage, and the most important ones are on social media."

=== Discrediting criticism by associating it with Hamas ===
The Israeli Ministry of Foreign Affairs responded to the 31 August 2025 resolution of the International Association of Genocide Scholars that Israel is committing genocide in Gaza by claiming that it is "entirely based on Hamas's campaign of lies." According to +972 Magazine, a special unit in the Israeli military called the "Legitimization Cell" works to identify journalists in Gaza that it can depict as undercover Hamas operatives to render them legitimate targets to kill, in an attempt to stifle media coverage of its activities in Gaza and quell international outrage over Israel's killing of journalists.

== Advocacy by Zionist organizations on behalf of Israel ==
The Nation has described the Anti-Defamation League as "Israel's Attack Dog in the US."

== Videos and images of October 7 ==
=== "Film of Horrors" ===
The IDF Spokesperson's Unit created a 47-minute film collecting raw footage of the surprise attack on Israel, including clips taken from body cameras worn by Hamas fighters that contained scenes of torture, murder, and mutilation of bodies. The film states that it does not include documentation of rape cases in order not to harm the families' dignity, except "only the parts after which it is very clear that there was rape". The official name of the film is Bearing Witness to the October 7th Massacre but it was called "The Film of Horrors" by Israeli media and the public. Its viewing was restricted and was not distributed among the general public reportedly due to the film's distressing content and potential harm to viewer's mental health. Official representatives of Israel (Ministry of Foreign Affairs, IDF Spokesman, Israel's Ambassador to the UN) conducted closed screenings for leaders in Israel and the world, including members of parliament, journalists, and media editors among others.

=== Targets depicted and contrasting Arabic media ===
The raw footage from the IDF film focused on the attacks on Israeli civilians and foreign workers. This was substantially different from the heavily edited videos that the Qassam Brigades (the military wing of the Hamas movement) officially published on their website and telegram channel with the watermark of their military media unit, and which has been re-published by many international news outlets, particularly in Arabic. The official edited videos from the Brigades focused almost entirely on the attacks on military infrastructure and killings of Israeli soldiers, and killings of other armed adult men. The Israeli women shown by the Qassam Brigades in their official videos were alive and fully clothed. Karina Ariev, a 19-year-old IDF military surveillance worker taken hostage at Nahal Oz military outpost, was also wrapped in a bedsheet, showing only her face. These photos were also included in the Jerusalem Post Israeli papers, but the stories with them speculated at length about possible sexual violence

=== Al Jazeera English response ===
Al Jazeera English produced their own video covering the October 7 attacks. The documentary condemned the proven attacks on civilians, such as the mass shooting at the Nova music festival, grenades thrown into air raid shelters, and the taking of civilian hostages, while also criticizing Israel's public diplomacy, particularly ZAKA for ignoring crimes with indisputable evidence, and instead "focusing on the crimes that Hamas didn't commit".

=== Hostage proof of life videos ===
One counter narrative from some Israelis was that several families released photos and videos to the media that were published by the Palestinian militant groups.

=== Hamas.com ===
In November 2023, Israeli social media accounts shared hamas.com, a website with videos and pictures of the October 7 attacks released by the IDF that was claimed to be created by Hamas. Fact-checking website Misbar reported that Hamas had confirmed on Telegram that its official website is hamas.ps.

== "Do you condemn Hamas?" ==
It became a common question in both Israeli and international media to ask for condemnation of Hamas and the October 7 attacks. Pro-Palestinian activists described the question to The Forward as a tactic to start the narrative on October 7, omitting the events of preceding years, and is "meant to shut down discussion". Mondoweiss writer James Ray suggested that it "muddles" expressions of solidarity and is meant to obscure what they call a "colonial context" of the events.

Governments, corporations, and public figures from around the world have issued condemnations. The Yale School of Management's Chief Executive Leadership Institute published a "List of Companies That Have Condemned Hamas' Terrorist Attack on Israel", including over 200 companies, mostly from the North America and Europe. Around half of the list was German, including Volkswagen and Bayer, among others. In October 2023, more than 100 leading German corporations jointly released a statement in major newspapers condemning the attack.

ISIS have previously condemned Hamas, viewing them as apostates. In September 2024 Israeli newspaper Israel Hayom said that ISIS had condemned Hamas, based on their statement that "The Palestinians are being sacrificed for Iran", though Hamas was not mentioned by name. Israeli leaders have regularly equated Hamas with ISIS, a conflation that has been described by subject matter expert Monica Marks as an attempt to "muffle criticism of the country's treatment of Palestinians".

== The contemporary significance of the Holocaust ==
=== "Never again is now" ===
The phrases 'Never again' and 'Never again is now' have primarily been used in reference to preventing a repeat of The Holocaust, but has also been used to advocate genocide prevention more broadly. In an interview with NPR, author and journalist Masha Gessen said "I believe that to deliver on the promise of 'Never again', we have to constantly be checking to see if we are once again sliding into the darkness, which I believe is something that's happening in Gaza today..." and "... we can say that it really resembles the situation not only of ghettos, but of the liquidation of ghettos in Nazi-occupied Europe. And this is the moment for the world to say if we're going to make good on the promise of 'Never Again', we have to step in now".

A full-page ad was published in several major newspapers with the title "Never again is now." The ad was undersigned by over 100 German companies, with the message, "We all condemn Hamas's terrorist attack on Israel and we see with horror the suffering of civilians in Israel and Gaza ... As German companies, we stand against all forms of hatred and antisemitism".

== Hamas is ISIS ==
The phrase "Hamas is ISIS" was first used by the prime minister of Israel, Benjamin Netanyahu near the end of the 2014 Gaza War. Israeli journalists criticized the comparison and his sharing of real ISIS propaganda in social media posts, including photos of James Foley from an ISIS beheading video. Neyanyahu followed this by saying, "Hamas is ISIS and ISIS is Hamas", in a 2014 speech at the United Nations. In 2016, the head of the Department of Political Science at Hebron University, said it was dangerous to conflate Hamas and ISIS. It was argued by some Israeli journalists that Hamas more closely resembled the Irgun and Lehi than ISIS.

In the first days of the Israeli attack on the Gaza Strip, The Jerusalem Post published an article describing the similarities between the groups' influences, as identified by Dr. Harel Chorev from the Moshe Dayan Center for Middle Eastern and African Studies, as well as a quote from Benjamin Netanyahu saying, "They are savages. Hamas is ISIS". In a public address made alongside Secretary Antony J. Blinken, Netanyahu said, "Hamas is ISIS, and just as ISIS was crushed, so too will Hamas be crushed".

Several differences between the two groups have been described by international military experts and mainstream media organizations. Where ISIS seek a theocratic system of government that rejects democracy and persecutes Christians, Hamas participated in the 2006 Palestinian legislative election, with the Hamas-led electoral list that won including a Palestinian Christian running for the Christian reserved seat in Gaza City. Other differences include their positions on nationalism, Shia Islam, and the destruction of cultural heritage. Talal Abu Zarifa, a leader from the DFLP (a secular faction allied to Hamas), said Israel was using the comparison to "justify its annihilation of Palestinian people and bloodshed". Among the commonalities described is their shared status as designated terrorist groups by the United States and the United Kingdom.

=== #HamasIsISIS ===
The hashtag "#HamasIsISIS" went viral on social media early in the war. Ella Kenan, who works as a travel blogger, promoted the hashtag near the beginning of the Gaza war, asking her 200,000 followers to spread it. The hashtag became one of the most popular in Israel on Twitter/X and had been used in posts containing graphic material. These tweets reached, among others, Ahmed Taha, an influencer from the United Arab Emirates with close to half a million followers, as well as the founding partner of Salesforce and the owner of Time magazine, Marc Benioff. The message was also included in speeches by Israeli Prime Minister Benjamin Netanyahu and the President of the United States, Joe Biden.

=== #TheWestIsNext ===
Another common hashtag used early on in the war was "#TheWestIsNext", a message directed towards the Western world implying that Hamas is a threat, not only to Israel, but to the entire Western world.

== Advocacy by public figures ==
Several actors, directors, and online influencers defended Israel's actions during the war and advocated for their support.

Former Israeli Prime Minister Naftali Bennett was often interviewed by foreign media networks, where he argued Israel's military response was justified due to the brutality of Hamas, which he compared to Nazis. Bennett also worked to raise the morale of Israeli soldiers and civilians, coining the phrase "We have a nation of lions".

Yoseph Haddad, an Arab-Israeli journalist and advocacy activist, had given several interviews to foreign media organizations. He published several videos online describing the crimes committed by Hamas and what he saw as the world's hypocrisy in its attitude towards Israel. Haddad also addressed Palestinians directly in Arabic, calling on them to rebel against Hamas and overthrow it.

Mosab Hassan Yousef, the son of a co-founder to Hamas and a spy for the Shin Bet during the Second Intifada, has repeatedly condemned Hamas and its jihadist ideology in interviews.

In interviews, British author and journalist Douglas Murray has rejected attempts to blame Israel for the situation in Gaza, saying that "Proportion during a conflict is a joke. Only Israelis are expected to respond proportionately." and that in a war, the losing side usually has more casualties and that does not mean that they are the victim. Murray also came out against pro-Palestinian and progressive protesters and activists who denied atrocities committed by Hamas, and called it "real-time Holocaust denial".

Actor and founder of the advocacy organization Act for Israel, Noa Tishby expanded her activism's target audience, mainly in the United States. Political commentator and media host Ben Shapiro has regularly commented on the war during his regular programs, defending Israel while participating in several public debates. In a debate at the University of Oxford in Great Britain, Shapiro confronted pro-Palestinian students by asserting the cruelty of Hamas and refused to follow "Palestinian propaganda".

Nathaniel Buzolic, an Australian actor best known for portraying the character of Cole Michaelson in the series The Vampire Diaries and its spin-off series, The Originals, has also been a public proponent of Israel. Since the beginning of the war he has raised awareness on behalf of the State of Israel, having flown there to show the world what is happening in the country.

Gal Gadot, an Israeli model, actress, and producer, best known for portraying the characters Gisele Yashar in the "Fast and Furious" movie series and Wonder Woman in the movie of the same name, made several efforts to show Hollywood the "Horror Movie" of the October 7 attacks.

President of Argentina, Javier Milei, has openly expressed himself as an enthusiastic supporter of Israel, having visited the nation several times since the beginning of the war and planted a tree in Jerusalem. As a sign of support for Israel, he's said he's converting to Judaism.

== Eretz Nehederet sketches ==
=== Queers for Palestine sketch ===
On November 5, 2023, "Eretz Nehederet" aired a skit mocking Progressivism at United States university campuses. The skit depicted stereotypes of two queer activists from the Queers for Palestine movement, supportively talking with a Hamas militant.

The militant speaks openly about wanting to kill Jews and LGBTQ people, saying "we will throw you from the roof, you homosexual dirt!" with the activists continuing to praise and support him.

=== Sketch about BBC coverage ===
Eretz Nehederet (Wonderful Land in English) also released two skits mocking the BBC news channel for what it expressed as one-sided coverage against Israel and in particular for their report on the explosion at the Al-Ahli Arab Hospital in which they blamed Israel, which resonated with several viewers in Britain and went viral. On November 14, "Eretz Nehederet" published another skit mocking the BBC, in which the presenter Rachel interviews Yahya Sanwar in a very sympathetic manner and, among other things, accuses an Israeli baby who was kidnapped by Hamas and cries in the background of sleep deprivation torture against Sinwar, who is holding him. At the end of the interview, Rachel turns to the BBC's "Moment in History" corner and there, next to pictures from World War II, the narration is heard: "In 1944 Winston Churchill refused a cease-fire and continued the genocide of Nazi Germany - which turned the Germans into victims - and Britain into a war criminal". Churchill has been accused of a genocide during World War II, but it occurred in Bengal, and there was a baby kidnapped on October 7 but the only actual baby (child under two years old) was kidnapped by the Lions of the Wilderness and held in Khan Yunis, above ground by the Mujahideen Brigades.

=== Sketch mocking universities ===
In December 2023, "Eretz Nehederet" aired a skit in English with the participation of Michael Rapaport mocking the presidents of the elite universities by hearing that Albus Dumbledore conducts for three professors at Hogwarts who expressed support for the "genocide of Botshams" and after being told that it was because of a lot of money from the Qatari state, he also joins. In the second skit, a video clip was shown in which the leaders of Hamas sing as they spend millions of dollars in Qatar on luxury following the skit opening where a crying Palestinian actress asks for donations to Gaza, with all the money goes to the leaders of Hamas in Qatar.

Universities often do not follow mainstream thought. Universities within Israel also have a long track record of being critical of the Israeli government than most establishments, during the 2023 Israeli judicial reform controversy, a prominent historian at an Israeli university said, "It Really Does Recall Germany in 1933" (an overt analogy to Nazi Germany). (Note: This historian has reflected at length about when this analogy comparing Israel to Nazi Germany is and is not appropriate.)

== Advocacy by citizens ==
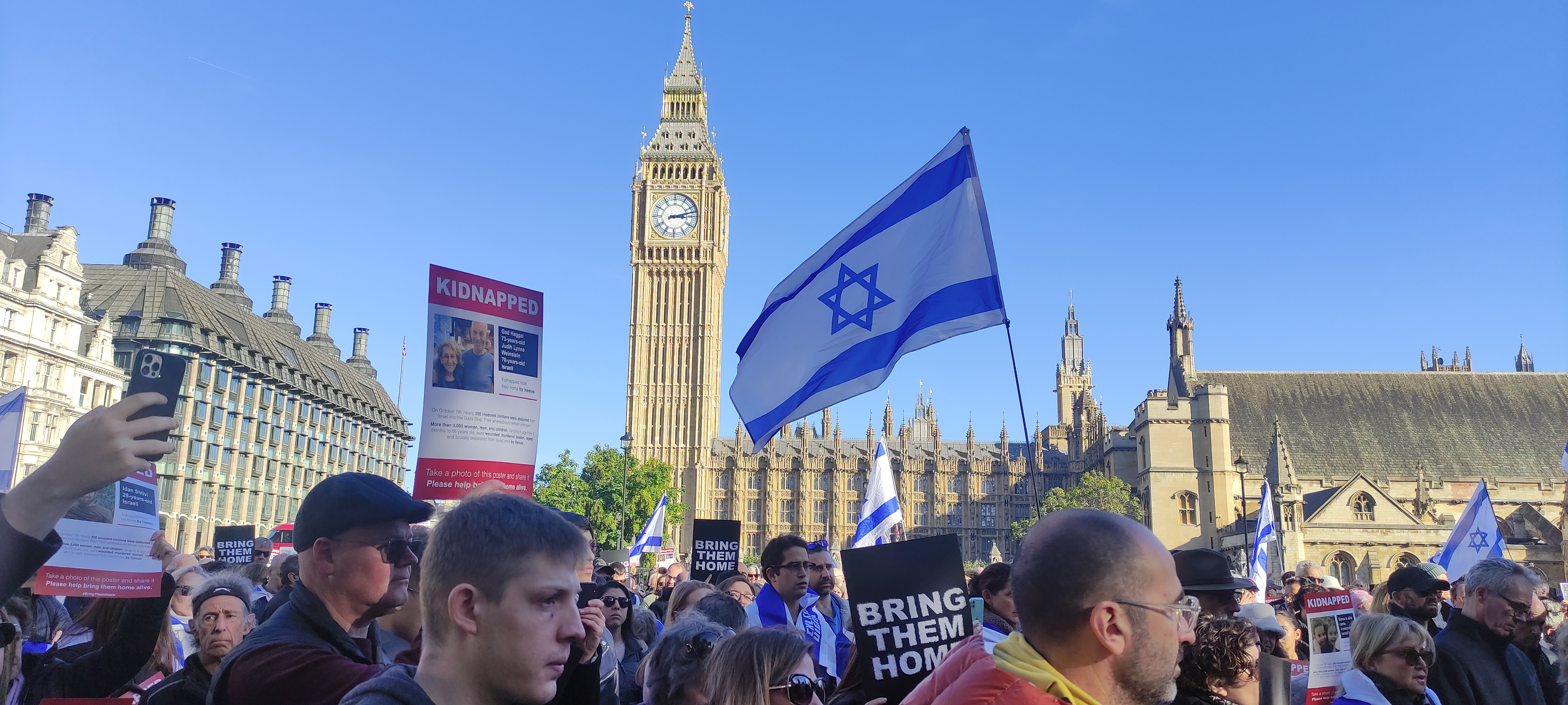
A demonstration of support for Israel and a call for the return of the abductees at Parliament Square in London.

Many Israelis worked during the war to explain and justify Israel's actions, especially on social networks. They spread war crimes and civilian attacks committed by Hamas, with many establishing civilian headquarters for the sake of disseminating Israeli hasbara. Israeli media outlets publish content in foreign languages to promote Israeli advocacy. Kan 11 published a series of videos in English, Spanish, Persian, and Arabic. Israeli news site Mako worked online on the outreach effort on its Instagram account. Videos have been circulated around the internet encouraging and explaining how to join this front, with many private individuals taking responsibility to spread pro-Israel hasbara while publicly criticizing the contrasting discourse.

Following the war, a number of civilian information headquarters were established. The Civil Information Headquarters headed by Eliav Batito conducted many hasbara activities that include, among other things, documentation, distribution, translation, fact-checking, and positive news. Veteran organizations also joined the informational struggle. StandWithUs is an international pro-Israel advocacy organization that created several videos, infographics, and other content for distribution on social networks. The Israelize association held online seminars designed to train the public for advocacy. The Deployact organization began training programs for the student population and reservists to participate in hasbara missions around the world. A delegation from the organization, which visited the International Court of Justice in The Hague, was widely covered in the Israeli and international media.

The argument raised against the effectiveness of the private initiatives is that the algorithms of the social networks result in the majority of the target audience exposed to the content being Israelis themselves, with only a few percent of the viewers of the content living outside of Israel.

=== Civil Information Headquarters ===
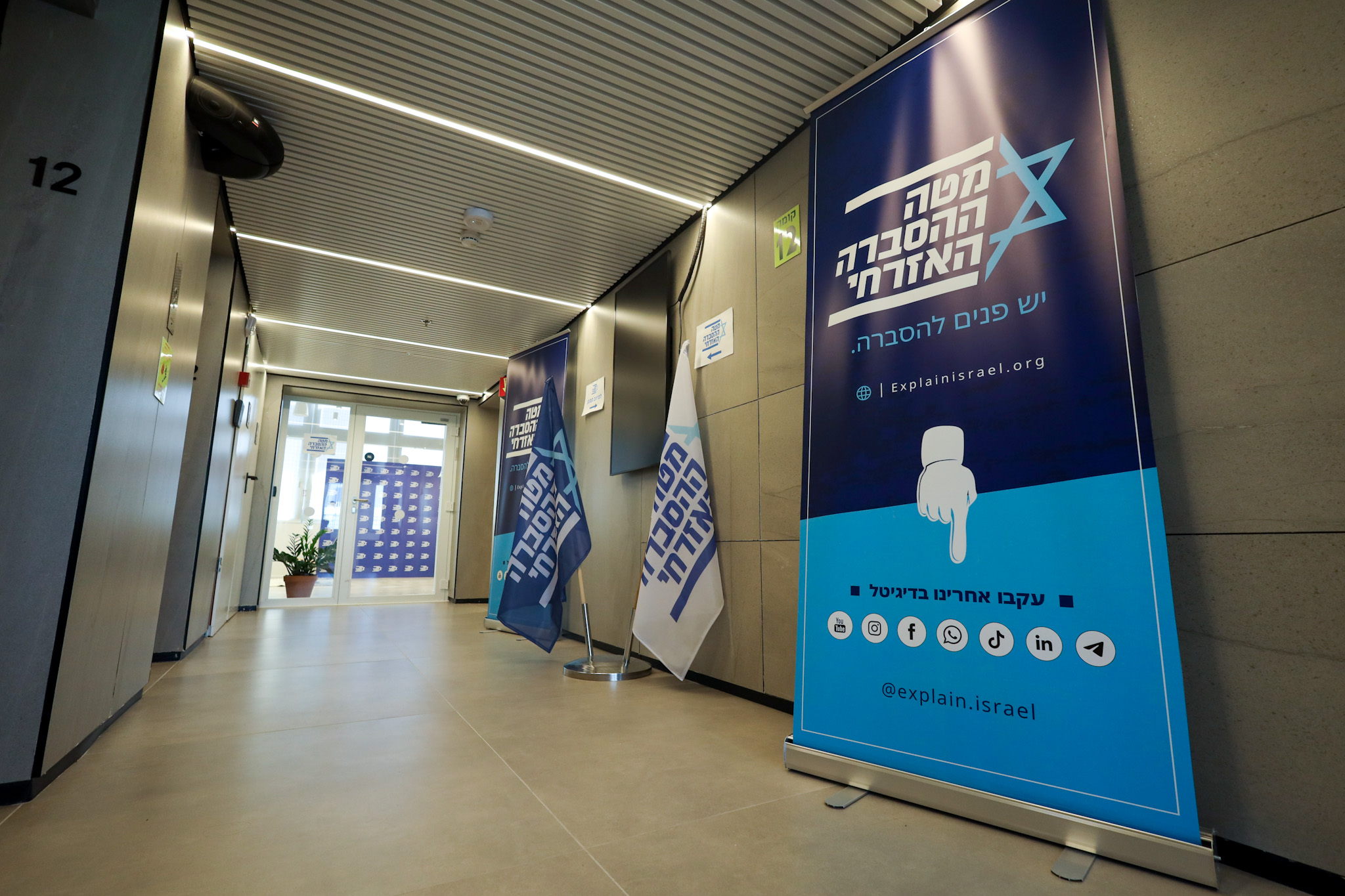
Offices of the Civil Information Headquarters

The Civil Advocacy Headquarters (in English: Israeli Spirit) is a non-profit pro-Israel advocacy organization that was established in Israel after the surprise attack by Hamas on October 7, 2023. The organization was established by a group of volunteers with the aim of creating broad awareness of Israel in Israel and around the world, while fighting the increasing rates of antisemitism around the world.

Within a few hours of the spontaneously created organization's beginning, close to 30,000 members joined the distribution pool. As a result, the need arose for content in a variety of languages that would be adapted to a variety of platforms. About three thousand volunteers joined to operate the array in various roles: interpreters, creative and content creators, video editors and graphic artists, research and production workers, psychologists, and social workers. In addition, about 30 technological collaborations with start-up and high-tech companies were mobilized for the organization.

Hanania Naftali posted a video on Facebook and on X (Twitter) in Malay / Indonesian in his character and voice on a background of photographs that correspond to his ideas, with a written translation in English. The film was watched in Malacca by Kenny Ong who asked an Israeli friend who spoke the language, who became aware of the matter at about the same time: "Does Hananya Naftali understand Malay?" It turns out that the language is ringing in Hanania Naftali's mouth, and the video is a successful propaganda, and the video was also distributed by the Israeli listener. Another video by Hanania Naftali addresses the residents of Malaysia in English.

=== "Kidnapped from Israel" signs ===
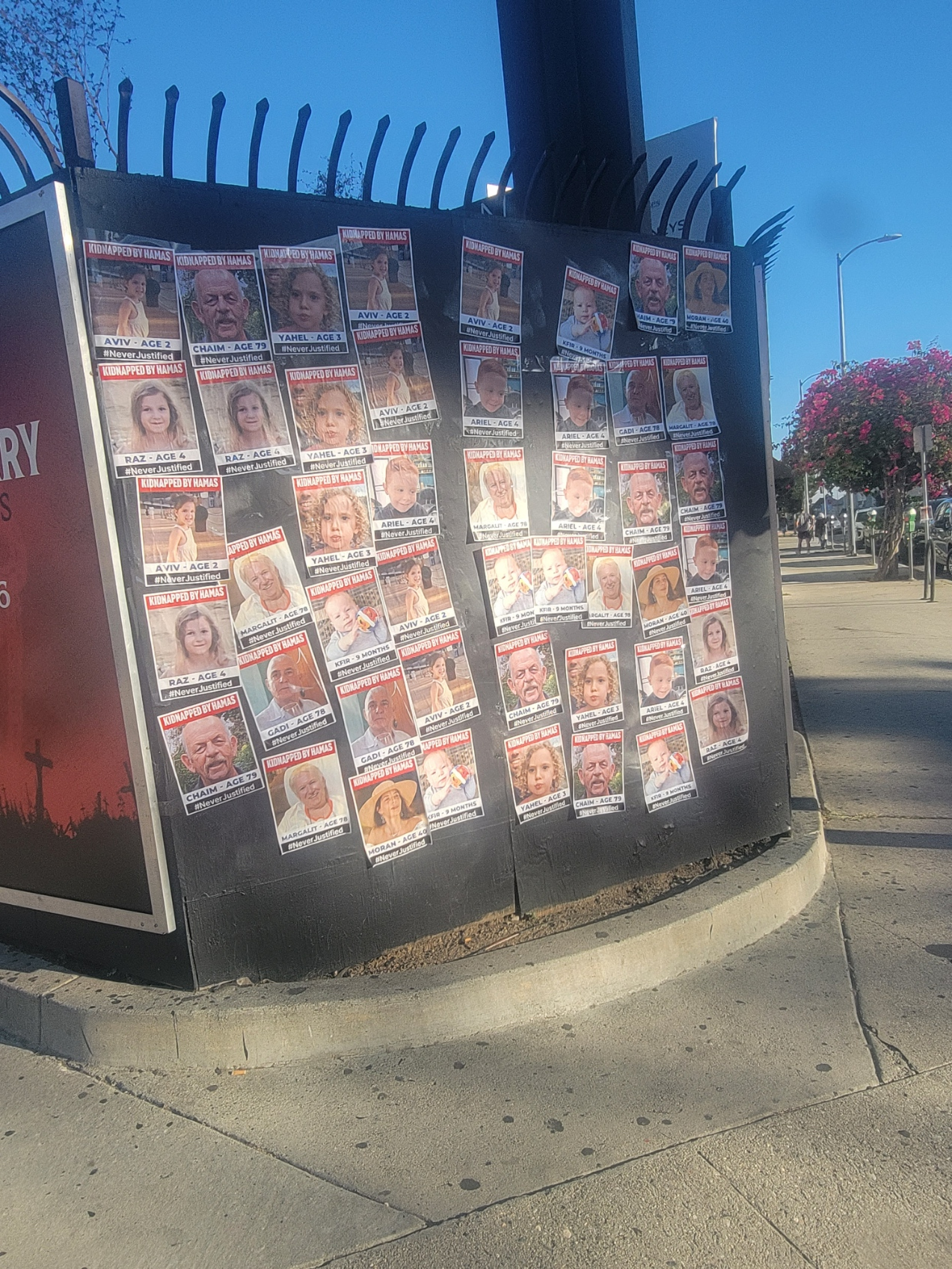
Posters of hostages taken by Hamas during the Gaza war, taken in Los Angeles.

The "Kidnapped from Israel" campaign began as an initiative of the duo of artists "Deda" and Nitzan Mintz together in a residency program in New York and in collaboration with the Israeli designer Tal Hoover. The campaign, which shows the faces of several dozen of the civilians and soldiers kidnapped by Hamas is based on the missing persons notice format known to the public in the United States. The signs were initially distributed by the artists themselves and the Israeli community in New York, but in a short period of time, it became an outdoor campaign distributed around the world. The signs were placed mainly on walls, barriers, fences, and railings. Each sign refers to one of many abductees who were currently being held in the Gaza Strip. At the top of the sign is written "Kidnapped", in the center is a large photo of the abductee and at the bottom is his name and age, and below them is the hashtag "#NeverJustified" and "Never Justified" (referring to the kidnapping of civilians).

The distribution and hanging of the signs led to lively discussion and uproar around the world. More than once, pro-Palestinian activists around the world were seen ripping off the ads, which also led to many verbal confrontations captured on video and shared through social media and news platforms.

== Hostages and Missing Families Forum ==
The evening after the surprise attack, the families of the abductees and the missing held a press conference, in which they demanded that the Israeli government open a regular dialogue with the families, appoint a person responsible for these affairs, hold an operation aimed at returning the missing to Israel, and push for the immediate involvement of Arab leaders in the world with the aim of freeing the captives. The government appointed Gal Hirsch to be responsible for the matter.

Later, the headquarters published three demands:

1. Immediate release of all the hostages, since their holding is contrary to international law, in which it is defined as a war crime and a crime against humanity.
2. Immediate opening of a humanitarian corridor to supply medicine and necessary equipment to the chronically ill and injured hostages, as well as arranging an examination of all hostages by a doctor.
3. Intervention and assistance of the leaders of the neighboring countries in favor of the immediate release of the kidnapped hostages.

=== Operations ===
On October 18, representatives of the families of the abductees met with the President of the United States Joe Biden, who made a special visit to Israel in the midst of the war. Biden stated that the United States fully supports Israel and is working for the release of the abductees, and that it will contribute as much of its resources as is required to accomplish this goal. On October 24, a delegation from the headquarters of the families of the abductees arrived at the UN Security Council discussion regarding the Gaza war. The parents of Omer Neutra, who was abducted to Gaza, spoke at the Security Council hearing and demanded that the UN act to return the abductees following them stating that the UN refused to act against Hamas. The next day, after Queen Rania of Jordan denied the beheading of civilians by the fighters of the military wing of Hamas. In response, headquarters sent her a link to a coded website that includes videos of beheadings, burning of bodies and abuse of civilians by troops.

== Key issues ==
=== Hamas use of civilians as human shields ===
==== Shifa Hospital ====
On October 27, 2023, in a briefing to the foreign media, IDF spokesman Daniel Hagari presented intelligence information that reportedly proved that Hamas had located its main headquarters and many other pieces of military infrastructure — including an additional central headquarters, a network of tunnels for military operations, shelters for senior Hamas officials, IML warehouses, and Management centers of rocket fire— under al-Shifa Hospital in the heart of Gaza City in order to use the hospital as a human shield and to prevent IDF attacks on infrastructure and senior Hamas officials. The information was also passed on to the intelligence organizations of Israel's allies.

On November 6, 2023, a commentator on the Saudi Al-Arabiya network said that the command center of Hamas was located under Shifa Hospital, thereby accepting or confirming the words of the IDF. On November 15, 2023, IDF special forces raided Shifa Hospital and stated that they had uncovered weapons, technological equipment, and Hamas command rooms. They further asserted that photos of the Israeli abductees were found on computers seized in the raid. On November 16, an IDF spokesman claimed that a Hamas van full of weapons and intended for the attack on October 7 was located in the Shifa Hospital complex. Tunnel shafts, underground infrastructure, weapons and intelligence information were also said to have been located in the hospital. On November 19, combat engineering forces, Yahalom and Oketz uncovered a Hamas tunnel under Shifa Hospital. One of the tunnels was 10 meters deep and 55 meters long, where one of the entrances was blocked by an armored door with a bullet hole. That evening, the IDF spokesman presented photos from security cameras from Shifa Hospital that showed armed Hamas troops taking civilians who were kidnapped on October 7 into there. He also claimed that Hamas fighter murdered the abductee Noa Marciano inside Shifa Hospital. On November 22, the IDF spokesman published documentation of the tunnels and basements that were uncovered under the Qatari building at Shifa Hospital. In addition, he let the media accompany them on a tour, photograph them themselves and report them to the public.

==== Hamas' use of hospitals ====
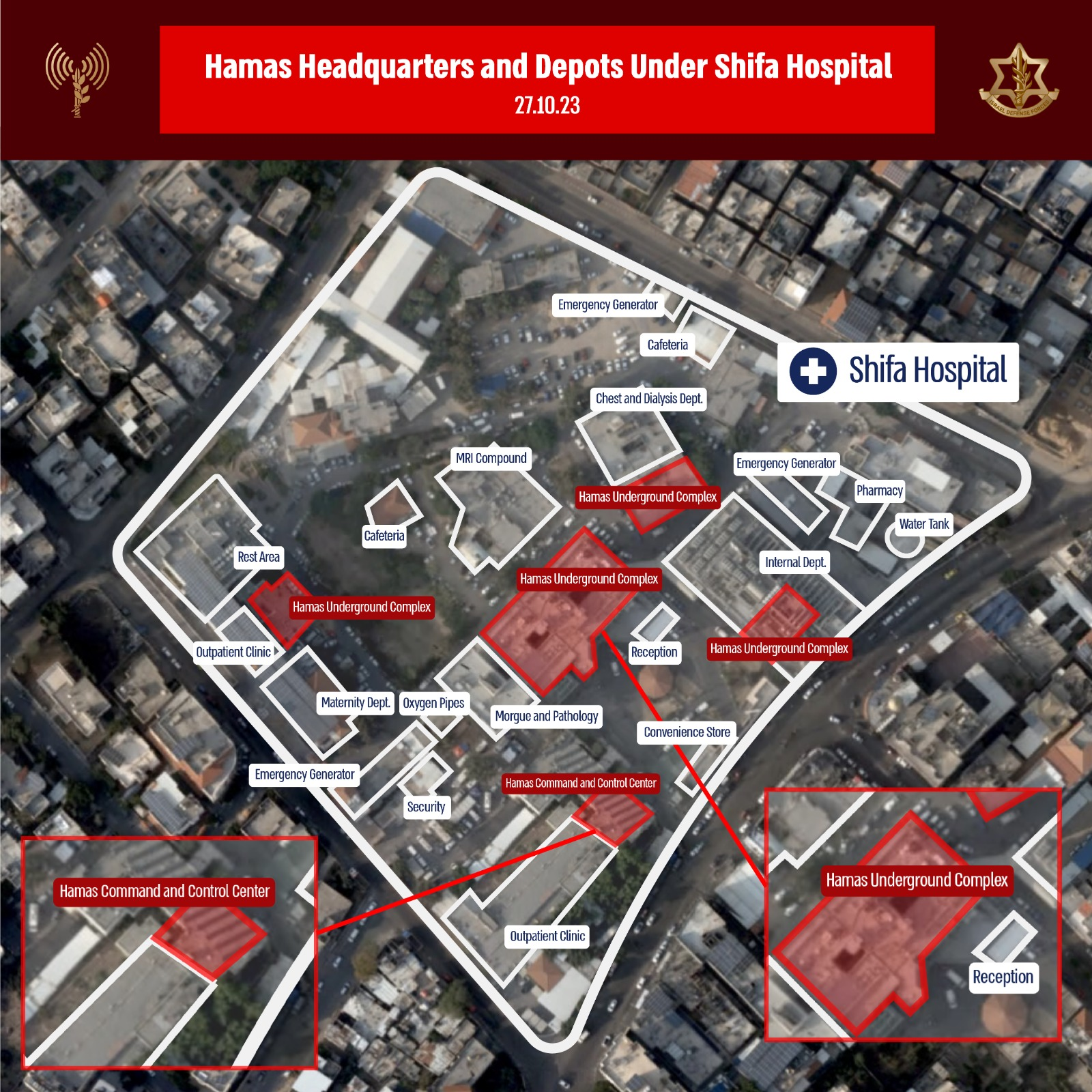
An Israeli Defense Forces aerial photograph of Shifa Hospital and Hamas headquarters it claims are below it, marked in red

On November 13, 2023, IDF spokesman Daniel Hagari, together with Shayetet 13 and accompanied by foreign reporters with cameras, raided the Rantisi hospital in Gaza, which was evacuated before the raid. He presented photographs from the hospital that showed Hamas use for militant purposes stated that it was possible that hostage children were held there. The photographs showed tunnel shafts, a motorcycle used by the kidnappers, documents with Hamas guard duty records, a basement with equipment for a long stay, including electricity (stolen from the hospital), ventilation, a kitchen and toilets, weapons, an explosive belt, and ammunition found among the patients. In December 2023, the forces of Yahalom, Shayetet 13, and TKS 14 uncovered a long and branching network of tunnels under the Al-Rantisi hospital, containing many strategic Hamas infrastructure and shafts. The tunnel connected the hospital to several areas throughout Gaza. On December 27, 2023, after the mapping of the tunnels by the Yehalom fighters, the forces of the Combat Engineering Corps blew up the tunnels.

On November 14, John Kirby, head of the National Security Council of the United States, said that the United States had intelligence that Hamas and the Palestinian Islamic Jihad were using hospitals for military purposes and held and, at the time, likely still held hostages kidnapped in the October 7th attack.

On November 1, 2023, the IDF published a conversation which purportedly recorded how Hamas stole 1,000 liters of fuel from a hospital. The IDF also shared a video of two IDF soldiers removing large amounts of cash from the hospital's safe and putting it into bags, two small stacks of envelopes had the political party logo of Gaza's government, they soldiers described this as "terror funds" and appeared to be emptying the entire contents of the safe.

==== Alleged disclosure of weapons in educational institutions ====
During the fighting in the Gaza Strip, IDF forces stated numerous times that they found many weapons and ammunition, including artillery rockets, which they alleged were stored or hidden in educational institutions, schools, and kindergartens. The allegations were documented by fighters of the IDF, the IDF's spokesperson and also by media outlets that accompanied the fighters. On December 2, IDF forces stated that they had uncovered thirty Grad rockets along with anti-aircraft guns and large amounts of ammunition, hidden under UNRWA boxes.

=== Response of international women's organizations to rape allegations ===
In the attack on Israel on October 7, 2023, Hamas militants are alleged to have carried out sexual assaults and sexual abuse on a large scale against Israeli women, girls and men. Some international organizations refused to condemn the alleged actions, with some groups saying that these claims were not proven.

In response, over 150 Israeli and international women's organizations published a letter in which they attacked the organizations in question: "It is unthinkable that a UN agency responsible for women's rights ignores the abduction of women, babies, girls, children and men from their homes, committing crimes war against women, children and girls, and the murder of over a thousand innocent civilians". They also organized a campaign against the United Nations Organization for the Advancement and Empowerment of Women, and the hashtag "#MeTooUnlessURaJew" was created (which is based on the MeToo campaign against sexual violence against women). Many women demonstrated in front of the UN headquarters, and prepared a performance that included women dressed in bloody leotards.

In December 2023, the United Nations Organization for the Advancement and Empowerment of Women published a condemnation of Hamas's actions, but it was criticized by (among others) Foreign Minister Eli Cohen and Israel's Ambassador to the United Nations Gilad Erdan, who said that it was too weak and came too late for it to appear as anything but a mandatory, minimum concern statement.

On December 4, 2023, Israel's ambassador to the United Nations, in cooperation with the World Zionist Organization, the Hadassah Zionist Organization, and other Jewish organizations, organized a protest event against the silence of the United Nations and the neglect of the women harmed by Hamas. Testimonies and evidence of alleged Hamas crimes were presented at the event with many diplomats participating.

== Misinformation and criticism ==
Israel has released several pieces of incorrect or unverified information, leading to questions about its credibility. Much of the content has been viral in nature, with tens of millions of posts in circulation on social media. A variety of sources, including government officials, media outlets, and social media influencers across different countries, have contributed to the spread of these inaccuracies.

Writing for openDemocracy, British academic Paul Rogers stated, "Israel must maintain the pretence of an orderly war with few civilians killed. Netanyahu's government is lying, but it would be naive to expect otherwise. Lying is what many powerful states routinely do, particularly in wartime". In The Intercept, investigative journalist Jeremy Scahill wrote, "At the center of Israel's information warfare campaign is a tactical mission to dehumanize Palestinians and to flood the public discourse with a stream of false, unsubstantiated, and unverifiable allegations".

According to the Press and Information Office of the Federal Government of Germany, some misinformation spread online about the conflict has been anti-Semitic in nature.

=== Denial of IDF actions ===
In December 2023, an analysis by The Washington Post confirmed reports by Human Rights Watch that Israel had used white phosphorus in an attack on Lebanon, directly contradicting the IDF. In January 2024, after an Israeli airstrike killed journalist Hamza Dahdouh, the IDF called Dahdouh a "suspect" who was hit while driving with a "terrorist"; however, The Washington Post found "no indications that either man was operating as anything other than a journalist that day".

After reports spread that a mother and daughter were killed by Israeli snipers in December 2023 in a church where a number of Palestinian Christians sheltered, the Israeli army denied targerting the compound, but claimed instead there was Hamas activity in its vicinity and Israeli soldiers shot back. Catholic officials and Member of British Parliament Layla Moran, who maintained contact with refugees in the church, stated, on the contrary, that no Palestinian belligerents were in the area and that the two women had been killed by the Israeli army, who were the ones preventing the refugees from leaving.

The Israeli army also denied responsibility for the killing of 5-year-old Hind Rajab, her family and the Palestine Red Crescent Society paramedics sent to rescue her, saying that their forces were not in firing range on the day of the girl's death. However, both Al Jazeera and The Washington Post concluded, based on investigation of satellite imagery, that Israeli armored vehicles were indeed in the area at the time.

In regards to the March 2024 Flour massacre, a CNN investigation said that "Mark Regev, the Israeli prime minister's special adviser, initially told CNN that Israeli forces had not been involved". However the IDF said soon after that "soldiers had not fired directly on Palestinians seeking aid, but rather fired "warning shots" in the air".

=== False and unverified accusations of Hamas actions ===
After bombing a tent camp in Rafah in an area that Israel had designated as a "safe zone" for civilians, killing 45 people, Israeli officials initially told their American counterparts that they believed their airstrike ignited a nearby fuel tank, creating a large fire. James Cavanaugh, who worked at the ATF, said the fire did not indicate "some giant stash that exploded". The New York Times viewed numerous videos and did not find evidence that a significant secondary explosion was ignited.

==== Healthcare ====
In October 2023, shortly after the Al-Ahli Arab Hospital explosion, Israeli sources published audio purporting to show two Hamas militants in a phone call claiming responsibility for the act and blaming it on a malfunctioning rocket. Hamas claimed the recording was an "obvious fabrication", and the British Channel 4 interviewed two independent Arab journalists who expressed similar views.

In November 2023, a video posted by the IDF showed Daniel Hagari, inside the Al-Rantisi Children's Hospital, where he claimed that the IDF had found Hamas weapons and technology, as well as a "list of terrorist names" in Arabic with the title "Operation Al-Aqsa Flood", showing each agents' rota guarding the hostages. However, a translation of the document showed that it contained no names but instead a calendar of the days of the week. After the questioning of the veracity of the claim, an Israeli spokesperson backtracked, but CNN, while removing the segment, did not provide an editors' note acknowledging the change or the dispute over the initial video.

In December 2023, Israel stated there was a Hamas tunnel network connected to the Al-Shifa Hospital; however, a report by The Washington Post found "There is no evidence that the tunnels could be accessed from inside hospital wards". That same month, Israel claimed 12 UNRWA staff members had participated in the 7 October attack on Israel; however, the Financial Times, Sky News, and Channel 4 all stated that Israel's claims were not proven by the intelligence documents they reviewed. In February 2024, the IDF stated Hamas was stealing humanitarian aid, leading David M. Satterfield, a senior U.S. envoy, to say there was no evidence to support Israel's claims.

==== Beheadings ====
Members of ZAKA including Otmazgin and Simcha Greiniman claimed to have photos depicting genital mutilation, including nails and knives inserted into the groin and genitals. These were shared with the UN's Special Representative of the Secretary-General on Sexual Violence in Conflict Pramila Patten's fact-finding mission, as well as NBC News. Both concluded these claims could not be verified based on the provided photos. Israeli soldiers, the Israeli Forces, and the first responder Israeli organization ZAKA said on French Israeli TV channel i24news that they had seen the bodies of beheaded infants at the site of the Kfar Aza massacre. This claim was repeated by U.S. President Biden separately, who stated that he "had seen photographic evidence of terrorists beheading children". NBC News called reports of "40 beheaded babies" unverified allegations, adding that they appeared "to have originated from Israeli soldiers and people affiliated with the Israel Defense Force" and that "an Israeli official told CNN the government had not confirmed claims of the beheadings". The allegation mainly "stemmed from a viral Israeli news broadcast clip" and the main X / Twitter accounts propagating the claims were i24NEWS and Israel's official account, even though Israeli Defense spokesperson Doron Spielman told NBC News that he could not confirm i24NEWS's report.

In a speech to the Republican Jewish Coalition on 28 October, Eli Beer, founder of Israeli volunteer EMS group United Hatzalah, claimed that Hamas had burned a baby alive in an oven, with many journalists sharing the claim in tweets seen over 10 million times. Israeli journalists and police found no evidence for the claim, and a representative of ZAKA, a first responder organization, said the claim was "false".

On 4 December 2023, Haaretz reported on Israeli claims about beheaded babies, stating that these "unverified stories [had been] disseminated by Israeli search and rescue groups, army officers and even Sara Netanyahu". (Note: The false claims that babies were beheaded in the Hamas assault were not promoted only by Israeli civilians or rescue volunteers, but also by the government. Le Monde has stated: "Israel has done nothing to fight it and has more often tried to instrumentalize it than deny it, fueling accusations of media manipulation".)

==== Allegations of sexual violence ====
The AP reported that two ZAKA volunteers, including its commander Chaim Otmazgin, made false statements about sexual violence and rape on October 7. Otmazgin claimed he found a raped woman due to her pants having been pulled down below her waist. He showed photos to the AP as part of his testimony. However, this had been caused by her body being moved by a group of soldiers. Yossi Landau, another ZAKA volunteer, claimed he found a pregnant woman killed with a fetus removed from her womb. This was also proven to be false. When challenged, Landau offered to show Al Jazeera a photo on his phone of the stabbed foetus, but is filmed admitting he is unable to do so.

=== Reactions ===
United Nations (UN) Director-General Antonio Guterres has accused Israel of spreading misinformation about the war in Gaza in an attempt to lower the credibility of the UN. Speaking about Israel's decision not to allow foreign journalists into Gaza, UN secretary-general Antonio Guterres stated, "Denying international journalists entry into Gaza is allowing disinformation and false narratives to flourish". The technology director of the Institute for Strategic Dialogue stated, "The corrosion of the information landscape is undermining the ability of audiences to distinguish truth from falsehood on a terrible scale".

== See also ==
- Eylon Levy
- Hen Mazzig
- Middle East Media Research Institute
- HonestReporting
- Jewish Internet Defense Force
- Hanover Institute for Public Policy
