= Esther Project =

Israel social media campaign

The Esther Project is an Israeli social media campaign aimed at swaying American public opinion in the face of the ongoing Gaza war and genocide. According to the contract, signed on behalf of the Israeli government's Foreign Ministry and Advertising Agency (LAPAM), a cohort of 14-18 social media influencers were to post content in favor of Israel 25–30 times per month from July 2025 through November 2025 on Instagram, YouTube, TikTok, and Twitter/X.

According to the Jewish Telegraphic Agency, it is unclear if the campaign is linked to the similarly named Project Esther, a plan to combat alleged antisemitism by the Heritage Foundation.

News outlets reported that Israel is paying US influencers to post content to improve its public image on Instagram, TikTok, and other social media platforms. Records filed with the US Department of Justice, as required by the Foreign Agents Registration Act (FARA), show that the Israeli government is funding a clandestine political messaging campaign in the US, including influencer campaigning and more traditional big-budget political campaigning, to "assist with promoting cultural interchange between the United States and Israel." The campaign includes up to US$900,000 in payments, and influencers are reportedly paid approximately $7,000 per post.

== History ==
According to US Department of Justice (DOJ) filings, Israeli consultants Uri Steinberg and Yair Levi established Bridges Partners LLC, the firm responsible for Israel's influencer network, June 2025 in Delaware. The firm then received about $200,000 to recruit social media influencers based in the US. The arrangement went through the German division of the global public relations firm Havas Media Group. The campaign was initiated to improve Israel's public image, which had been damaged by the ongoing Gaza war and genocide.

According to The Jerusalem Post, the documents also include payments to contractors, indicating that—beyond paying influencers individually for posts—the project aims to develop a "support ecosystem" that includes legal compliance, campaign analytics, and content production. According to the Jewish Telegraphic Agency, it is unclear if the campaign is linked to Project Esther, a plan to combat alleged antisemitism by the Heritage Foundation.

Although the identities of the social media influencers contracted in Esther Project are not clear, several influencers have taken sponsored public relations trips to Israel in the preceding period, with trips organized by entities such as Israel's Ministry of Diaspora Affairs and Combating Antisemitism and Israel365 Action. (Note: This trip was partially funded through a $86,000 contract with the Israeli Foreign Ministry.) According to the Columbia Journalism Review, invitations for these trips have been extended to content creators with influence in the US, such as Eitan Fischberger, Noa Cochva, Xaviaer DuRousseau, and Jeremy Awakens.

In a September 2025 meeting with pro-Israel influencers in New York, Israeli Prime Minister Benjamin Netanyahu said, "We have to fight with the weapons that apply to the battlefields in which we engage, and the most important ones are on social media." The Jewish Telegraphic Agency named Lizzy Savetsky, Ari Acker, Zach Sage Fox, Miriam Ezagui, and Joyce Chabb as being among the influencers photographed at the meeting. Savetsky has denied receiving payment from Israel.

The campaign comes amid what Israeli officials are describing as an 'eighth front'—a push for influence in what Alex Traiman of the Jewish News Syndicate has called the "information battlefield", including in mainstream media, at universities, and on social media—which includes a US$1.5 million per month contract with AI-driven political campaign firm Clock Tower X LLC and Brad Parscale, former campaign manager of Donald Trump. This project is registered under FARA as a "campaign in the United States to combat antisemitism."

== Payments ==
Haaretz reported that, according to records connected to the FARA filings, Bridges Partners has already paid US$15,000 to Nadav Shtrauchler, a communications consultant who had worked with Netanyahu and the Hostages and Missing Families Forum, and $10,000 to Pnina Rezidor, a digital marketing strategist from Israel.

== See also ==
- Hasbara – Public relations work by the State of Israel
