= Project Alamo =

2016 Donald Trump voter information database

"Project Alamo" was a database of voter information created for Donald Trump's 2016 presidential campaign and an associated fundraising and political advertising operation on social media platforms. It was organized by the Giles-Parscale firm in San Antonio, Texas. The campaign paid Giles-Parscale as much as $94 million for fundraising, political advertising, and digital media services, including the creation of Trump's website. A new database of voter information named "Project Alamo" was at the heart of Giles-Parscale's efforts, allowing highly targeted advertising on social media platforms. The advertising campaigns added to the database over time, driving more effective targeting. Hundreds of thousands of targeted ads were delivered daily for the fundraising and political advertising campaigns on social media. Project Alamo has been credited as an important factor in Trump's 2016 victory.

== Fundraising ==
Giles-Parscale raised over $250 million for Donald Trump, primarily through Facebook. Giles-Parscale used targeting tools that are part of the Facebook advertising platform to deliver carefully crafted ads soliciting small donations from specific audiences defined by demographics, interests, and affinities. When a contributor would make a small donation, that person's information would be rolled up in a database of contributors that the firm would then reach more directly for future fundraising efforts. Facebook was thus used for cost-effective donor discovery, essentially a funnel for new contributors.

After the election, Brad Parscale, a principal at Giles-Parscale and the Trump campaign's Digital Director, described how the Facebook fundraising funnel worked: "Maybe you see an ad on Facebook and donate $5. Now you're in my system. So now it doesn't become efficient for me to get money from you on Facebook because they charge me. So I start using other means; cell phone, email and other operations to get to you to make further donations."

Giles-Parscale targeted fundraising ads through Facebook's "Lookalike Audiences" tool, finding new people with similar characteristics to known Trump supporters based on demographics, interests, and affinities. The inputs for lookalike targeting included a database of Trump supporters from the campaign as well as multiple data sources from the Republican National Committee. Once the lookalike audience profiles were defined, ads could then be targeted and served to them based on what was known about them. Giles-Parscale created and A/B-tested thousands of ad variants, tuning them for maximum effectiveness.

Facebook allows micro-targeting down to neighborhoods (geographically) and also by very narrow interests and affinities.

== Political advertising ==
The fundraising ads created to attract donors also contained key political messages and themes for the Trump campaign, so the fundraising ads doubled as political ads. The cost to surface a fundraising ad would naturally drop as more people interacted with the ad (through Facebook's surfacing algorithms), increasing its effectiveness as a messaging tool as well as a donor discovery mechanism. This was not a strategy that was unique to Giles-Parscale or to Trump, but the scale at which this dual strategy was used in Project Alamo was certainly notable.

In addition to fundraising ads, Giles-Parscale identified 14.4 million persuadable voters in key districts of swing states and targeted political ads at them through Facebook and other social media platforms. The ads were intended to galvanize turn-out for Trump supporters and suppress turn-out for key Democratic voters. In the San Antonio Express-News interview referenced earlier, Parscale said of the targeted ads, "That's why we won. We knew just the voters we needed to turn out and we turned them out in big numbers".

Thousands of ad variants were A/B-tested for effectiveness. Gary Coby, director of advertising at the Republican National Committee, said, "On any given day…the campaign was running 40,000 to 50,000 variants of its ads, testing how they performed in different formats, with subtitles and without, and static versus video, among other small differences. On the day of the third presidential debate in October, the team ran 175,000 variations." Coby called this "A/B testing on steroids."

== Dark advertising and dark posts ==
Giles-Parscale's Facebook ads in the 2016 campaign included "dark posts"; targeted Facebook ads that appear in a user's Facebook Newsfeed without visibility to anyone else on the platform (e.g. other Facebook friends). These were considered "dark advertising," as the advertisements did not include any reference or link to the advertiser.

In response to the outcry over dark advertising on Facebook, CEO Mark Zuckerberg announced in September 2017 that all future political ads would be linked to the advertiser. Additional details were rolled out in October 2017, including the requirement that all call-outs or banners advertised would specify who paid for them. Facebook now aggregates every ad purchased by an advertiser on a special page and maintains a searchable archive of each advertiser's ads going back four years.

== The name "Project Alamo" ==
The moniker "Project Alamo" was initially attached to the database of voter information created and used by Giles-Parscale during the 2016 campaign but eventually encompassed the associated fundraising and political advertising efforts as well. The name is believed to be derived from the location of Giles-Parscale in San Antonio (which was the nerve center of the digital operations during the campaign), also the location of the Battle of the Alamo.

== See also ==
- Cambridge Analytica
