= FullSIX =

French marketing agency

FullSIX Group
- Type: Subsidiary
- Industry: Marketing and communication
- Founded: Paris, France (1998)
- Area served: Worldwide
- Key people: Marco TINELLI, group President; Benoît STORELLI, group CEO; Fabien ROCHETTE Group COO
- Revenue: €80 million
- Number of employees: 900
- Parent: Havas
- Website: www.group.fullsix.com

The FullSIX Group is an independent European marketing group. Founded in Paris by Marco Tinelli in 1998 under the name Grey Interactive, over the past 15 years the digital agency has become an integrated communications group composed of 20 agencies around Europe and in 8 different countries (France, Spain, Portugal, Italy, United Kingdom, Germany, U.S. and China).

FullSIX Group has 10 agency networks: FullSIX, Grand Union, Ekino, FullSIX Advertising, FullSIX Media, FullSIX Data, FullSIX Search, FullSIX Retail, FullBooster and Novalem.

In September 2015, FullSIX was acquired by Havas Group in a transaction worth $75 Million. Prior to joining Havas Group - FullSIX was the largest independent Digital Marketing agency in France.

== History ==
- 1998 = 6 partners create Grey Interactive in Paris.
- 2001 = Grey Interactive becomes FullSIX and merges with Inferentia DNM (listed on the new market of Milan)
- 2004 = Launch of FullSIX New York
- 2005 = Launch of FullSIX Asia in Shanghai, of the 6:AM Network (France, Italy), and of the SixandCo network (France and United Kingdom)
- 2006 = Launch of the OTO Research network (France, Italy), acquisition of SEMS (Search Marketing), launch of FullSIX Spain
- 2007 = Launch of Fullsix Germany, of Backelite, and of 6:AM in United Kingdom. Revenues exceed 50 million Euros.
- 2008 = FullSIX celebrates 10 years. Purchase of FullSIX by its management and the investment fund Cognetas.
- 2009 = FullSIX elected independent communications group of the year (France)
- 2010 = Acquisition of Grand Union in the UK
- 2010 = Creation of Grand Union Italy
- 2011 = Launch of FullSIX Deutschland
- 2012 = FullSIX elected independent communications group of the year (France)

== Awards and campaigns ==
In 2010, FullSIX Group was elected Agency of the Year 2010 in Portugal, and independent communications group of the year" in France in 2009.

Sample campaigns of 2010:

- Sprite "Green Eyed World"
- New Club Med Website
- DIESEL Cam

== Management ==
FullSIX group

- President of the Supervisory Board: Thierry Paternot
- Group President: Marco Tinelli
- Group CFO: Marc Vilalta
- Chief Technical Officer: Yann Doussot
- Group COO: Fabien Rochette
- Group CEO: Benoît Storelli
- Iberia CEO: Filipa Caldeira
- UK CEO: Hugh Baillie
- Germany CEO: Harald Kling
- USA CEO : Melissa Di Memmo
- Italy CEO: Nadia PEROLARI
- Asia CEO: Stephan Montigaud
