= Saudi American Public Relation Affairs Committee =

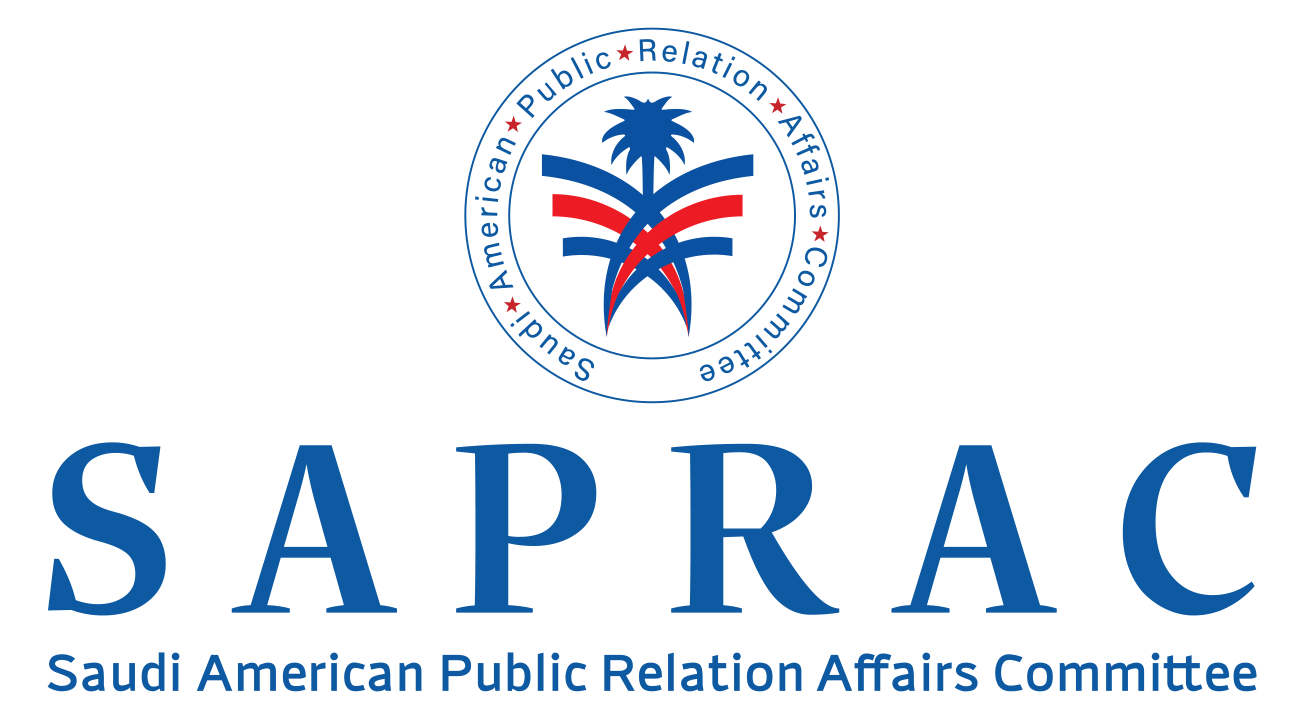
- Industry: Government and public relations
- Founded: 2016
- Founders: Salman Al-Ansari
- Headquarters: Washington, D.C.
- Website: www.saprac.org

The Saudi American Public Relation Affairs Committee is a pro-Saudi Arabia public relations and lobbying group based in Washington D.C. with the aim of improving the image of Saudi foreign policy in the United States and strengthening relations between Saudi Arabia and the United States. SAPRAC was founded in March 2016 by Salman Al-Ansari, a Saudi writer and political commentator and is headquartered at 1101 30th St NW in the Georgetown neighborhood of Washington D.C.. The group gets its funding from online subscriptions and corporate funding and seeks to influence policymakers more than the general public according to political observers.

In July 2017, SAPRAC purchased $138,000 on seven, 30-second TV spots on WRC-TV, and then $120,000 on four television advertisements played during NBC's Meet the Press. The advertisements were intended to portray Qatar in a bad light, characterizing them as state-sponsors of terror, and an opponent of U.S. allies in the Middle East. SAPRAC established a website called 'The Qatar Insider' which acts as a newsletter, disparaging the Qatari government and its policies. It also purchased ad slots on cable news shows playing the British Open golf tournament, which according to Reem Daffa, the group's executive director, was a deliberate move to influence President Donald Trump, an avid golf fan. However, the groups' founder, Salman al-Ansari, has said SAPRAC's role is an "informational" one rather than an "advocacy" one.

Barry Bennett, a Republican lobbyist and consultant, urged the Department of Justice in a letter to investigate SAPRAC for allegedly violating the Foreign Agents Registration Act. The group is registered in the U.S. House of Representatives and U.S. Senate as a lobbyist under domestic advocacy laws. In September 2017, the group registered as a foreign agent.
