= Office français d'information =

Press agency in Vichy France

The Office français d'information (OFI, transl. French Information Office) was the press agency controlled by the Vichy regime during the German occupation.

It was created on 10 December 1940 after the nationalization by the Vichy regime of the information branch of Havas. Initially based in the zone libre (the management in Vichy and the writers in Clermont-Ferrand), in 1942 the OFI moved to the Place de la Bourse in Paris.

The OFI worked closely with the Agence française d'information de presse (French Press Information Agency) (AFIP), created by the occupation authorities in the former Havas offices, noted for its propaganda activity.

Some Havas journalists, opposed to the collaboration, created the Agence française de presse (French Press Agency) in London in August 1940, and in North Africa the Agence France-Afrique in 1942. The French Resistance created its own clandestine press agency, the Agence d’information et de documentation (Information and Documentation Agency) (AID).

The OFI was dissolved by the loi du 9 avril 1944. During the Paris uprising of August 20, 1944, resistance journalists, including Gilles Martinet, seized the OFI offices and proclaimed the creation of Agence France-Presse, which became the agency France-Presse on September 30, 1944.

== See also ==
- Vichy France
- Havas
- Agence France-Presse
