= Havas =

French advertising and public relations company

Havas NV
- Formerly: Havas Conseil SA (1968–1975); Eurocom SA (1975–1996); Havas Advertising (1996–2002); Havas SA (2002–2024)
- Type: Public
- Traded as: Euronext Amsterdam: HAVAS
- Industry: Business Services
- Predecessor: Agence Havas; Vivendi advertising division
- Founded: 1968; 58 years ago
- Founders: Alain de Pouzilhac; Jacques Herail
- Headquarters: Puteaux, France
- Key people: Yannick Bolloré, (chairman and CEO); Jacques Séguéla, (vice chairman); Marian Salzman (CEO of Havas PR North America)
- Products: Advertising, marketing, media
- Revenue: ▲€2.87 billion (2023)
- Number of employees: 23,000
- Parent: Bolloré (2004–2017, 2024–present); Vivendi (2017–2024)
- Divisions: Havas Media Group; Havas Creative Group; Havas Health & You
- Website: www.havas.com

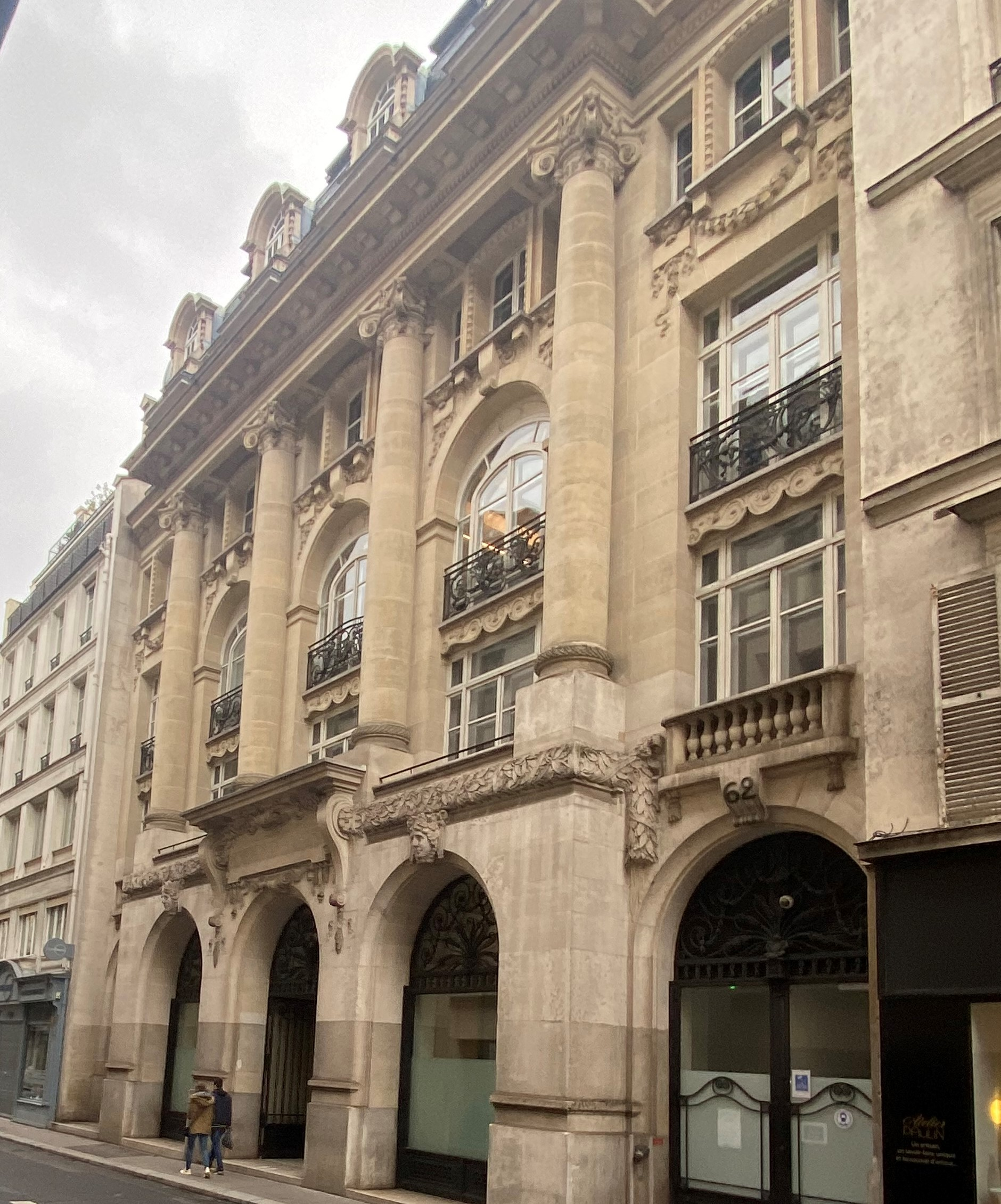
Building at 62, rue de Richelieu in Paris, built by the Société générale des Annonces and used by Havas from 1921 as head office of its advertising operations

Havas N.V. (French pronunciation: [avas]) is a French multinational advertising and public relations company, with its registered office and head office in Puteaux, France.

Havas operates in more than 100 countries. The group is structured into three main operational divisions, offering a wide range of services including digital advertising, direct marketing, media planning and buying, corporate communications, sales promotion, design, human resources, sports marketing, multimedia interactive communications, public relations, and innovation consulting.

== History ==
=== Early history ===
The original Havas was the world's first news agency, created in 1835 by Charles-Louis Havas. The Agence France-Presse news agency comes from it.

By 1968, Havas had become a diversified group which had, inter alia, media interests. These interests were incorporated into a société anonyme, Havas Conseil S.A., which expanded its business rapidly. In 1975, Havas Conseil split into five parts that re-merged to become Eurocom, a holding company of a Group of subsidiaries specializing in various communications activities.

Havas was first listed on the Paris Bourse in 1982. On 25 May 1987, Havas started the privatisation process as part of a nation-wide denationalization campaign and it was finished around June.

In 1991, Eurocom acquired the French advertising group RSCG, leading to the creation of the Euro RSCG Worldwide advertising network. RSCG had been the lead advertising agency for Peugeot. In 1996, Eurocom changed its name to Havas Advertising and created four operating divisions, Euro RSCG, Campus, Diversified Agencies, and Médiapolis. American Bob Schmetterer is named chairman and CEO of the largest division Euro RSCG, whose headquarters are moved to New York in 1997.

=== Vivendi ownership ===
In 1998, Compagnie Générale des Eaux, led by Jean-Marie Messier, changed its name to Vivendi and acquired both Havas S.A. and Havas Advertising; it acquired a third of Havas in February 1997, and the remainder in March 1998 in a deal that valued the company at €6 billion (£4.05 billion). Havas went on to acquire Cendant Software in November 1998 and it was renamed to Havas Interactive. Meanwhile, Havas Advertising started the Media Planning Group joint-venture with Spanish company Media Planning S.A. and acquired Snyder Communications.

Vivendi began to stop using the Havas name, starting with Havas S.A. becoming Vivendi Universal Publishing on 11 December 2000. In 2001, Vivendi sold off its remaining stake in Havas Advertising to institutional investors and Havas Advertising announced plans to both acquire the Havas name from Vivendi and rename itself to just "Havas". These decisions took effect at the annual shareholders meeting held on 23 May 2002.

=== Reclaimed brand ===
In September 2003, the group reorganized itself, as agencies from the Diversified Agencies division were sold or absorbed into three core divisions: Euro RSCG Worldwide (integrated communications); MPG (Media planning and buying) and Arnold Worldwide Partners (advertising). In July 2004, after having completed its strategic reorganization, Bolloré Group started acquiring a stake in Havas. In October, the Company completed a €404 million capital increase which enabled it to reduce its overall debt levels.

By 2005, Bolloré had amassed a 22% stake, obtained 4 seats on the Havas board at the shareholders meeting, and took control of the company. Chairman and CEO Alain de Pouzilhac was deposed in a boardroom coup on 21 June 2005. Other board and management level changes followed. The board appointed independent non-executive director Richard Colker as interim CEO. On 12 July 2005, Havas named Vincent Bolloré as board chairman, and veteran banker Philippe Wahl as chief executive officer. In March 2006, Havas named Fernando Rodés Vilà, son of the founder of Media Planning S.A. Leopoldo Rodés Castañes, as its new CEO.

Havas remained listed on Euronext, but delisted from the NASDAQ stock exchange as of 28 July 2006.

In March 2015, the group's main shareholder Bolloré S.A. sold a 22.5 percent stake in the firm for around €600 million, but announced it intended to remain a majority shareholder.

French corporate raider Vincent Bolloré, through his holding company the Bolloré Group, is the main shareholder, controlling 32.84% of the share capital as of 7 May 2012. Bolloré himself took over the chairmanship of the Havas board (Président du conseil d'administration). In November 2017, Havas acquired Malaysia-based agency Immerse and rebranded to Havas Immerse.

In April 2022, Havas acquired the UK-based digital agency and Google partner, Search Laboratory.

In April 2024, it was announced Havas had acquired the Paris-headquartered data consultancy company, TED Consulting.

In July 2024, four of their agencies - Havas London, Havas Lemz, Havas New York, and Havas Immerse - lost their B Corp status over work for Shell plc.

The company started trading at Euronext Amsterdam after its spin-off from Vivendi on 16 December 2024, the shares were trading at 1.91 euros on that day, up 6% on the opening price.

In January 2025, Havas acquired CA Sports, one of the largest sports marketing agencies in Spain.

== Timeline ==
Year	Event
1835	Foundation as a press agency by Charles-Louis Havas.
1879	The Havas news agency incorporated as a Société Anonyme (plc).
1920	Havas merges with the Société Générale d'Annonces and becomes the leading press manager (later extended to radio and cinema domains).
1923	Havas starts billboarding
1940	Havas' news agency is taken over by the Vichy government and named "Office français d'information"
1945	Havas' news service becomes Agence France-Presse
1968	Havas creates Havas Conseil S.A. to become advertising and media consultants
1975	Havas Conseil S.A. splits into five entities and they merge to form Eurocom
1987	Agence Havas is privatised and becomes Havas S.A.
1996	Eurocom S.A. changes its name to Havas Advertising S.A.
1997	Havas SA absorbs C.E.P. Communication, publisher of professional and medical journals as well as such magazines as L'Express and Le Point and owner of book publisher Groupe de la Cite
1998	Vivendi agrees to takeover of Havas (100%)
2000	Havas S.A. becomes Vivendi Universal Publishing
2001	Vivendi sells off remaining stake in Havas Advertising
2002	Havas Advertising buys the "Havas" brand from Vivendi and becomes just "Havas"
2022	HARMAN and Havas announce a global partnership for a globally integrated agency model

== Services ==
Havas is a media holding company, whose subsidiaries provide communication consulting services, through traditional advertising media (television, radio and print and display), to media buying, and various marketing services such as advertising management, direct marketing, sales promotion, corporate communications, blockchain and ICO marketing, healthcare communications, internal communications, Television sponsorship, design, human resources communications and interactive communications.

Attempting to be perceived by clients and potential clients as "more entrepreneurial and more agile", Havas adopted a new structure in late 2012. The agency network once known as Euro RSCG was rebranded 'Havas Worldwide', much like their compatriots Publicis and their network, named 'Publicis Worldwide'. Other advertising agencies owned by Havas, such as Arnold Worldwide are rebranded 'Havas Creative'; the media division remains as 'Havas Media'. Havas created an umbrella brand, Havas Digital Group, to operate across the Creative and Media divisions.

== Controversies ==
=== Case against former directors ===
Holding 22.01% of the share capital of Havas, on 21 June 2005, Bolloré ousted CEO Alain de Pouzilhac. Havas then dismissed Hérail for gross negligence; vice-chairman Alain Cayzac and others close to de Pouzilhac were also relieved of their services. Alain de Pouzilhac took Havas to court to seek unblocking of payment for non-compete that Havas had been withholding; civil cases were also launched by both for severance pay – a total of ten cases (including appeals) involving de Pouzilhac, four involving Hérail. Payment for de Pouzilhac's non-compete clause was upheld. Hérail and former Havas executives Alain Cayzac and Agnès Audier won at the labour tribunal, where Hérail was granted damages of close to €5 million.

Since the boardroom coup, Bolloré had consolidated control by further increasing his stake, which stood at 37% as of November 2012. Havas seized the Nanterre criminal court on 15 May 2007, and again in August and November 2007 to initiate three cases against de Pouzilhac, Hérail and Cayzac, accusing them of "conspiracy, misappropriating from the company, and attempting to cover up". Havas alleged that the three directors had signed new employment contracts during the takeover that gave them generous golden parachutes in the likely event of their removal. Also, de Pouzilhac was accused of conspiring with Hérail to grant payment of €300,000 to fellow director Thierry Meyer. The preliminary inquiry into the charges under public prosecutor Philippe Courroye lasted three years, during which time the accused were given either sporadic or no access to evidence for their defence, contrary to the legal requirements.

"The Tribunal took the view that the criminal proceedings had not complied with proper procedures, nor with the European Convention on Human Rights. The Nanterre Court said that specifically, the provisions of this Convention relating in particular to access to the case file, the personal assistance of counsel during the investigation and the balance between the parties had not been met. In its decision, the Court considered that, given the weight and complexity of the case, which had 700 items – a preliminary investigation was not the most appropriate way of proceeding. Instead, the case should have been by instruction, which allows adversarial examination."
Les Echos, 15 November 2012

The criminal court of Nanterre dismissed the last of these cases in November 2012, citing "the lack of equity and violation of the rights of the defence". Olivier Metzner and Olivier Bluche, lawyers for Alain de Pouzilhac and Jacques Hérail, criticised Vincent Bolloré for exploiting his close connection with Philippe Courroye, public prosecutor for Nanterre, to launch the case.

=== Israeli influence operations in the United States ===
Since 2024, Israel's influence operations in the United States have been primarily funneled through Havas Media Group. Havas Media Group has subcontracted several firms under the Foreign Agents Registration Act, including public relations firms SKDK, Clock Tower X, and Bridges Partners.

== See also ==
- CNews
