= Havas Media =

Media division of marketing group

Havas Media Network
- Type: Subsidiary
- Industry: Advertising and marketing communications Media Planning and Buying
- Number of locations: +140
- Number of employees: +10,000
- Parent: Havas
- Website: https://havasmedianetwork.com

Havas Media Network, formerly known as Havas Media Group, is the global media network of Havas. Headquartered in Puteaux, France, the network provides media planning and buying, commerce, performance marketing, data and analytics, sponsorship, experiential marketing, and technology consulting services, among others. The network operates in more than 140 and includes global brands such as Havas Media, Arena Media, Forward Media, Havas International, Havas Market, Havas Play and CSA.

== History ==
MPG was created in 1999 as the result of a merger between two media agencies: Media Planning S.A. founded in Spain in 1978 by Leopoldo Rodés Castañes which covered the Hispanic markets, and Médiapolis, a French company founded in 1980 by Havas Advertising. Havas initially acquired a 45% holding in MPG, which increased to 100% in May 2001. Fernando Rodés Vilà, who joined Media Planning S.A in 1994, was appointed Chief Executive Officer of Havas in March 2006. In October 2006, Havas announced that all its media assets would be reorganised under the umbrella of "Havas Media" and Alfonso Rodes Vila, brother of Fernando, was named CEO in July 2006.

In June 2009, Havas Media Group was criticized by the Industrial Workers of the World for firing 11% of their staff and only giving workers a four-week severance package. The union initiated a campaign to get their biggest client, Sears Holdings Corporation, to stop using MPG by protesting outside of Kmart stores. MPG has not publicly commented on the dispute.

In June 2022, Havas Media Group announced their global partnership with attention firm Lumen Research which will create tools to plan, measure, buy, and optimize attention.

In July 2024, four Havas companies had their B Corp status revoked because of their work on behalf of Shell Oil, which ran afoul of the certification's environmental standards.

During the 2020s, Havas expanded its media operations beyond traditional planning and buying into commerce, data and technology services. The network adopted the name Havas Media Network, reflecting a broader portfolio of specialist agencies and capabilities. During this period, Havas strengthened its media, digital and commerce offerings through a series of acquisitions and investments across multiple markets.

== Agency brands ==
Havas Media Network operates globally through a portfolio of media agencies, specialist consultancies and technology-enabled services supporting clients across multiple regions.

- Havas Media is the network's primary global media agency brand, providing media strategy, planning, investment, analytics and consultancy services.
- Arena Media is an integrated boutique media agency network focused on client.centered media planning and buying.
- Havas Market is the network's commerce, retail media and performance marketing division.
- Havas Playis the network's entertainment, gaming, sports, experiential and cultural engaement division.
- CSA is the data, analytics and technology consultancy arm of Havas Media Network.

== Israeli influence operations in the United States ==
Since 2024, Havas Media Group has subcontracted seven firms in the United States to conduct influence operations on behalf of Israel. Firms have included:

- Clock Tower X
- Show Faith by Works LLC
- Bridges Partners LLC
- Piro, Inc.
- SKDK LLC (parent company: Stagwell)
- Davis Media NY LLC (parent company: Stagwell)
- Targeted Communications Global (parent company: Stagwell)

As of 2026, Havas Media Group has received more than $100 million from the government of Israel to support its public relations (hasbara) efforts by subcontracting projects to US companies that target evangelical Christians, conservatives, young people and artificial intelligence chatbots.

In November 2026, Drop Site News reported that Jason Stokes and Abigail Ronson, campaign advisors for former US representative Mike Rogers's 2026 Michigan Senate campaign, were registered as foreign agents of Israel subcontracted through Havas Media Group.
