= Show Faith by Works =

American public relations agency

Show Faith by Works, LLC
- Founded: 2025
- Headquarters: San Diego, California
- Area served: Western United States
- Key people: Chad Schnitger

Show Faith by Works is an American, Christian public relations agency working on behalf of the State of Israel in the United States. It is among three American PR agencies hired by Israel's Ministry of Foreign Affairs to bolster the country's image in the United States, along with Clock Tower X and Bridges Partners.

Show Faith by Works is based in San Diego, California, and was founded by Chad Schnitger.

== History ==
In September 2025, officials with Show Faith by Works filed under Foreign Agents Registration Act that they were launching a $3.2 million digital marketing and influence campaign in support of Israel through grassroots and digital targeting in the western U.S. The campaign was described as the "largest Christian church geofencing campaign in U.S. history," with targets including churches and Christian college campuses in California, Arizona, Nevada, and Colorado. Churches in Texas were also targeted.

== See also ==
- Hasbara – Public relations work by the State of Israel
- Christian Zionism
