= CloudCommerce =

American software company

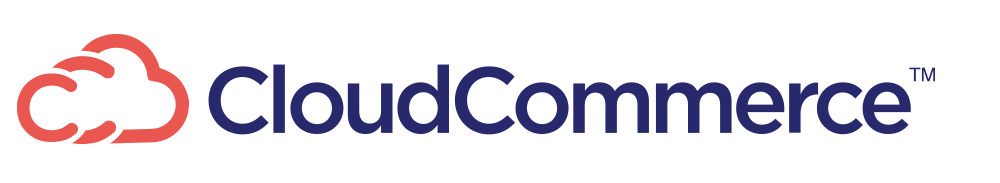
- Type: Public
- Traded as: CLWD
- Industry: Software
- Headquarters: San Antonio, Texas
- Key people: Andrew Van Noy (chief executive officer) Gregory Boden (chief financial officer)
- Services: Strategy, consulting, digital, technology, and operations
- Number of employees: 49

CloudCommerce, Inc., is a company based in the United States which provides digital marketing and analytics.

The company was traded OTC Pink as CLWD, but has since been renamed to AiAdvertising, trading as AiAd.

== Products and services ==
During the company's early period, Warp 9 and later CloudCommerce focused on providing cloud-based e-commerce and mobile-commerce services to online merchants. Its services included storefront design, web development, systems integration, digital marketing, analytics, and support for e-commerce platforms. Through its CLWD Operations subsidiary, previously Indaba Group, the company also offered Magento-related implementation and development services.

After making acquisitions in 2017, CloudCommerce's service lines expanded to include digital marketing, branding, web design, and managed hosting. Out of its subsidiaries Parscale Digital provides enterprise digital marketing services, WebTegrity develops websites and commerce-focused web properties, Giles Design Bureau provides creative design and branding services, and Parscale Media provides web hosting and related services. The company also formed Data Propria, which it described as a data analytics and audience-modeling business.

== History ==
The company began operating in Texas in 1999, and incorporated in Nevada in 2002 as Warp 9. It had subsidiaries of Roaming Messenger Inc. and Latinocare Management Corp. Andrew Van Noy became director, president, and CEO in 2012. Van Noy was previously a VP at PageTransformer and has a BS from BYU. His annual compensation as an executive officer is $195,000 plus 18 million unexercised options as of 2019. Gregory Boden, CFO, has annual compensation of $120,000 plus 70 million unexercised options as of 2019.

As of March 2020, CloudCommerce subsidiaries include CLWD Operations (previously Indaba Group), Parscale Digital (marketing), WebTegrity (website development), Data Propria (data science), Parscale Media (web hosting), and Giles Design Bureau (creative design).

The company acquired the trademark and domain name for CloudCommerce in 2015.

In August 2017, CloudCommerce acquired companies co-owned by Brad Parscale, Donald Trump's digital campaign manager, and his business partner Jill Giles, for $7.9 million in stock. This included subsidiaries Giles Design Bureau, Parscale Digital, and Jill Giles' Giles-Parscale company, which leases 8,200 square feet (760 m^{2}) of office space to Parscale Digital on a five-year lease for nearly $120,000 per year. CloudCommerce also acquired Parscale Media for $1 million in cash. At the time CloudCommerce valued the Parscale Creative name at nearly $2 million, later stating "We expected to retain the name and brand, leveraging the good reputation and client following. The name Parscale was revered in the digital advertising space." The company also valued the Parscale Media brand for the same reasons, valuing it at $100,000. Following the acquisition, Parscale joined CloudCommerce's board of directors. The company wrote off the remaining goodwill and intangibles from the Parscale Creative acquisition as a $6 million loss at the end of 2019, which included the indefinite asset of the "Parscale" name they had valued at nearly $2 million. CloudCommerce also wrote off $744,000 from the $1 million Parscale Media acquisition at that time, which included the $100,000 brand name.

Brad Parscale resigned from the Company's Board of Directors in December 2019. He still operates the Parscale Strategy company, which held the Giles-Parscale office furniture lease.

The company also acquired WebTegrity in November 2017 for $900,000 in stock.

Giles-Parscale was paid $94 million for its work on the Trump 2016 U.S. presidential election campaign, and gained notoriety for its expenditure on Cambridge Analytica psychometrics and Facebook advertisements.

In February 2018, CloudCommerce created the subsidiary Data Propria, employing at least four former Cambridge Analytica staffers.

The company was ranked as 235th fastest growing company in North America on Deloitte’s 2019 Technology Fast 500. In 2019 the company's revenue was $9.2 million, ending with a net loss of $10.1 million (which included the $6.76 million writeoff). In 2018 the company's revenue was $11.6 million revenue, ending with a net loss of $2.9 million in 2018. The company's auditor stated "substantial doubt about its ability to continue as a going concern." At the end of 2019, the company's ownership was Brad Parscale (34.9%), Andrew Van Noy (15.8%), Zachary Bartlett (13.9%), Ryan Shields (9.5%), Blake Gindi (8.7%), and Gregory Boden (4.1%).

As part of the COVID-19 pandemic, the company received a $780,680 federally backed small business loan from Cache Valley Bank on May 5 as part of the Paycheck Protection Program. CBS News stated Brad Parscale remains the largest shareholder of CloudCommerce.

== Controversies ==
There have been instances of financial misconduct reportedly committed by its senior member Andrew van Noy prior to joining CloudCommerce, and Jonathan Lei, a senior member of the predecessor to CloudCommerce.

In March 2020, Facebook removed CloudCommerce ads as these deemed misleading to the people. The ads promised a 10% high dividend payment.
