= Dark advertising =

Dark advertising is a type of online advertising visible only to the advert's publisher and the intended target group.

Dark advertising allows a publisher to send different adverts to different target audience groups, where it would be disadvantageous for the audience of one target group to see the adverts intended for another. This increases the success rate of the publisher's advertising campaign.

This form of advertising is commonly found on online social media platforms that make target group identification possible. Groups can be identified using age based targeting, geotargeting, behavioural targeting and more recently psychographic targeting, among others.

== History ==
In July 2012, the social network Facebook added the ability to create unpublished posts. These could be sponsored, citing "page posts usually contain information that are relevant to only a segment of the page's audience". The term "Dark Advertising" was coined by marketing professionals shortly after, and has been used in the media ever since.

It was reported that the Donald Trump presidential campaign used dark advertising during the 2016 United States presidential election to dissuade African Americans from voting.

In May 2017, a group of activists formed the Who Targets Me project, collecting data on how political campaigns used dark advertising during the 2017 United Kingdom general election and calling for an end to dark advertising on Facebook for political ads.

On 22 September 2017, Mark Zuckerberg, CEO of Facebook, announced that Facebook was ending dark advertising.

== Effects ==
Melanie Dempsey and Andrew Mitchell, authors of the Journal of Consumer Research, conducted an experiment with pens to prove the psychological effects of producers advertisements. After showing a group media of a specific pen brand associated with positive images, the group was asked to choose a pen. Knowing that the pen brand was not as good as other brands, 70-80% of the group chose the brand due to its positive association.

These psychological effects are forced upon consumers by producers and advertisers. This is seen due to companies tricking their consumers into "placing a greater importance on extrinsic values is associated with higher levels of prejudice, ... and weak (or absent) concern about human rights." These occurrences are now showing up in large scale topics, such as the presidential election. Large scale companies are able to pay for advertisements of their choosing, causing major waves in political elections. These advertisements play a large role in who is elected, due to association of those who see the advertisements.
