= Bridges Partners =

American public relations agency

Bridges Partners, LLC
- Founded: June 2025
- Founder: Yair Levi; Uri Steinberg

Bridges Partners is an American public relations agency working on behalf of the State of Israel in the United States. Bridges Partners manages the Esther Project, a pro-Israeli social media campaign in the US.

The company was among three American public relations companies hired by Israel's Ministry of Foreign Affairs via Havas Media Group to bolster the country's image in the U.S., in addition to Show Faith by Works and Clock Tower X.

Bridges Partners is based in Washington, D.C., and was co-founded by Israeli nationals Yair Levi and Uri Steinberg.

== History ==
Bridges Partners was founded in June 2025 in Delaware.

== Operations ==
According to Foreign Agents Registration Act registrations, Bridges Partners stated it had been hired by the Israeli government to recruit and pay influencers to "assist with promoting cultural interchange between the United States and Israel."

== See also ==
- Hasbara – Public relations work by the State of Israel
