= Brad Parscale =

Former campaign manager for Donald Trump (born 1976)

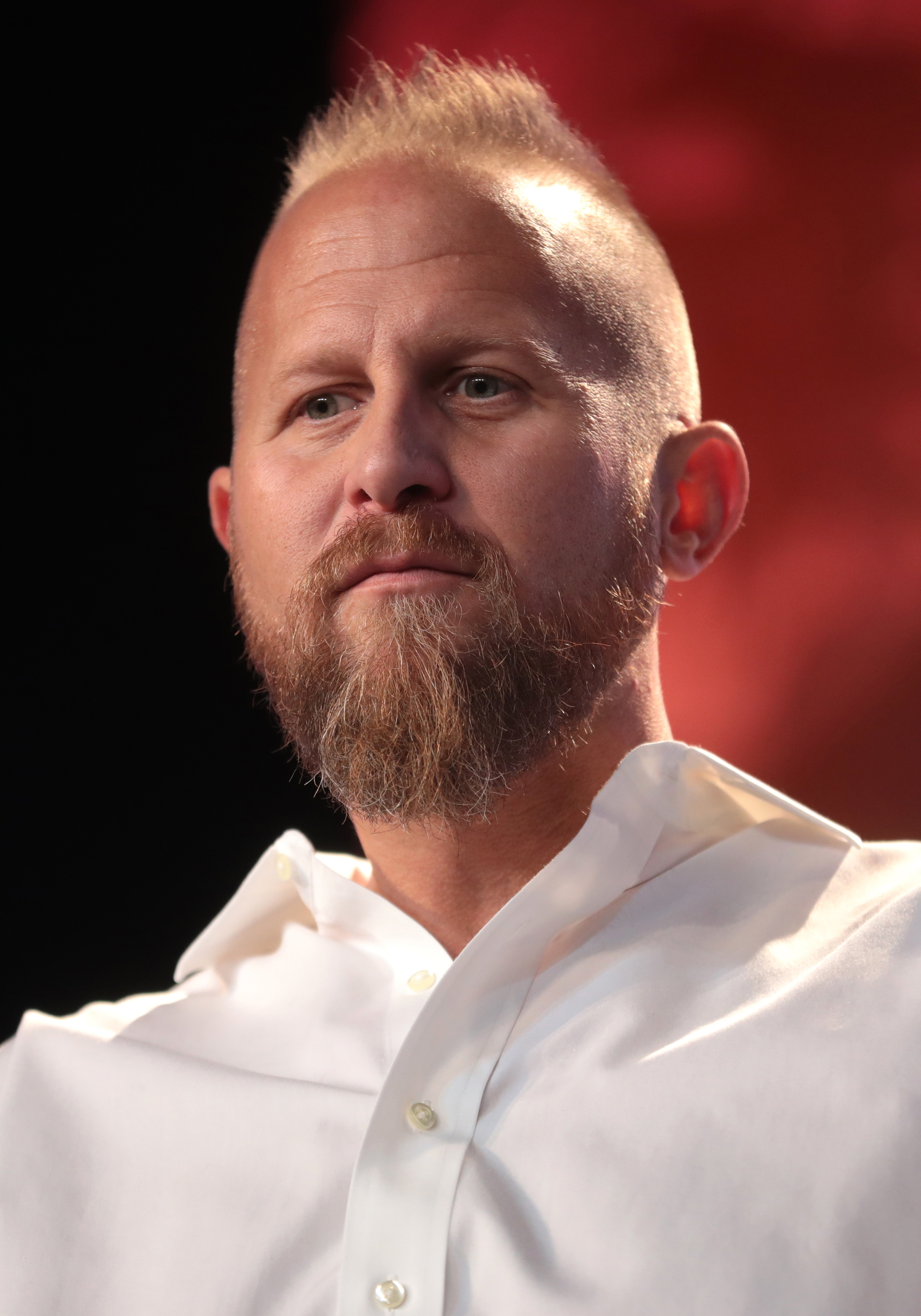
- Parscale in 2018
- Born: January 3, 1976 (age 50); Topeka, Kansas, U.S.
- Education: Trinity University (BS)
- Political party: Republican
- Spouse: Candice Parscale (m. 2012)
- Children: 3

Brad Parscale (born January 3, 1976) is an American digital consultant, media executive, and political advisor. He served as the senior adviser for data and digital operations for Donald Trump's 2020 presidential campaign. He previously served as the digital media director for Donald Trump's 2016 presidential campaign and as campaign manager for Donald Trump's 2020 presidential campaign from February 2018 to July 2020, being replaced by Bill Stepien. In September 2020, he stepped away from his company and the Trump campaign.

Parscale began working for the Trump Organization in 2011, developing and designing websites and creating and managing digital media strategies. In early 2015, Trump hired Parscale and his firm, Giles-Parscale, to create a website for his exploratory campaign. When Trump declared himself a Republican candidate in 2015, he asked Parscale to update the exploratory campaign site into a "full-fledged presidential campaign website."

Throughout the Republican primary, Parscale was responsible on behalf of Trump for managing the website, as well as digital media strategies and online fundraising campaigns. In June 2016, Parscale was officially named digital media director for the Trump for President campaign, overseeing all aspects of digital media and online fundraising, as well as traditional media strategy, like radio and television placements.

In January 2017, Parscale, along with senior Trump aide Nick Ayers, launched America First Policies, an organization to promote President Trump's agenda and White House initiatives. In 2025, Parscale was named Chief Strategy Officer of Salem Media Group. Since 2026, he has worked for the Israeli government, including through his company Clock Tower X, using various technologies to address declining support for Israel among American conservatives.

== Early life ==
Parscale was born in Topeka, Kansas. His father, Dwight Parscale, was an assistant attorney general in Kansas who ran unsuccessfully for Congress in 1974 at age 28 as a Democrat. Dwight Parscale owned a restaurant and operated a string of other businesses over the years, with Brad's mother, Rita. In the 1990s, Dwight Parscale was the CEO of NewTek, a computer products company.

Parscale, who is 6 ft 8 in (203 cm), played basketball at Shawnee Heights High School in Tecumseh, Kansas, graduating in 1994. He then attended two junior colleges, playing basketball well enough to get an athletic scholarship at the University of Texas at San Antonio. His father relocated NewTek to San Antonio while Parscale was playing basketball there.

Parscale left UT-San Antonio after one year; a knee injury cost him his sports scholarship. He transferred to Trinity University, also in San Antonio, where he earned a bachelor's degree in finance, international business and economics, graduating in 1999.

== Career ==
=== Early years ===
Parscale moved to Orange County, California, following graduation from college to work for his father, then the CEO of animation-software company Electric Image; Parscale worked as the sales manager. The company filed for bankruptcy in August 2002, and Parscale and his parents returned to San Antonio. Electric Image animation software was reconstituted as Electric Image Animation System 3D (eias3d.com).

In San Antonio, Parscale became a website developer. In October 2005, he incorporated his website business, which mostly produced simple websites for brick-and-mortar businesses in the area. Parscale has said that he started the company with an initial investment of $500; real estate records show that he owned three San Antonio homes at the time.

=== Giles–Parscale ===
After Parscale worked on several projects with graphic and web designer Jill Giles (who had her own small firm), the company Giles–Parscale was formed in July 2011. In early 2013, Parscale was also running another company, DevDemon, which marketed add-ons for web development; in a technology investment partnership (Turner Parscale LLC); and was involved in a physical therapy business. By May 2015, Giles-Parscale owned a 18,000 square foot building and had 46 employees and 800 clients.

In April 2012, the company was hired to build a website for Trump International Realty, after a deliberately low bid of $10,000. That led to further work in the Trump family: Trump Winery, the Eric Trump Foundation, and Caviar Complexe, Melania Trump's line of skin-care products. It also led to the firm's extensive work for the Donald Trump 2016 presidential campaign, and Parscale becoming the campaign's digital director.

In mid-2017, Parscale spun off his political work to a new company, Parscale Strategy, and relocated that business to Florida. In August 2017, the remaining company operations were purchased by CloudCommerce, a penny-stock firm, in a deal valued at $9 million in stock, and were renamed Parscale Digital. CloudCommerce also acquired San Antonio-based Parscale Media, but not Florida-based Parscale Strategy; Parscale became a member of the CloudCommerce board of directors.

In June 2018, Giles Design Bureau was broken out as a separate entity, run by Giles, with a staff of 15; Giles remained a major stockholder in CloudCommerce.

=== 2016 Donald Trump presidential campaign ===
In early 2015, Parscale's firm, Giles-Parscale, was hired to create a website for Donald Trump's exploratory campaign, charging $1,500 (~$2,037 in 2025) for the work. Between October and December 2015, Giles-Parscale was paid $21,000 (~$27,832 in 2025) by the Trump campaign.

Through the entire election cycle, Giles-Parscale was paid $94 million by the Trump campaign, much of which was used to pay for advertising and subcontractors. In 2016, Parscale was named the campaign's digital director.

Parscale used social media advertisements with an experiment-based strategy of different face expressions, font colors, and slogans like "Basket of Deplorables." Parscale's specific roles included heading the oversight of the digital advertising, television advertising, small dollar fundraising, direct mail, political and advertising budget, and liaising with Katie Walsh, who was then the Republican National Committee's chief of staff. He was also the head of data science and research, which included polling.

Parscale heavily used employees from Facebook, Twitter, Google, and other platforms for the campaign advertisements and embedded them on his staff to navigate the Facebook, Twitter, and Google platforms so that his staff could utilize all capabilities of these platforms. He denied having any assistance linked to Russia. Parscale did not have data scientists or any digital team during the Republican primary and did much of the social media advertising from his own home.

Parscale was able to utilize Facebook advertising to directly target individual voters in swing states. Parscale later said that he was able to target specific audiences who cared about infrastructure and promoted Trump and his message of improving American infrastructure. Although he hired Cambridge Analytica to assist with microtargeting and Cambridge Analytica stated that it was the key to Trump's victory, Parscale denied that he gained assistance from the firm because he thinks that Cambridge Analytica's use of psychographics doesn't work. Parscale also said: "I understood early that Facebook was how Donald Trump was going to win. Twitter is how he talked to the people. Facebook was going to be how he won."

The Trump campaign initially had solely Donald Trump's personal funding to back his campaign. Parscale set up a major grassroots campaign on Facebook that brought in funding quickly from across the U.S. Parscale attributed the success of his vast social media presence to using the assistance offered by companies such as Facebook, Twitter, Snapchat, and Google. He said that because the Trump campaign intended to spend $100 million on social media, companies in that area were prepared to assist the campaign in using that money effectively. The Washington Post later wrote that, in light of Trump's narrow electoral margin, Parscale could "justifiably take credit" for his victory.

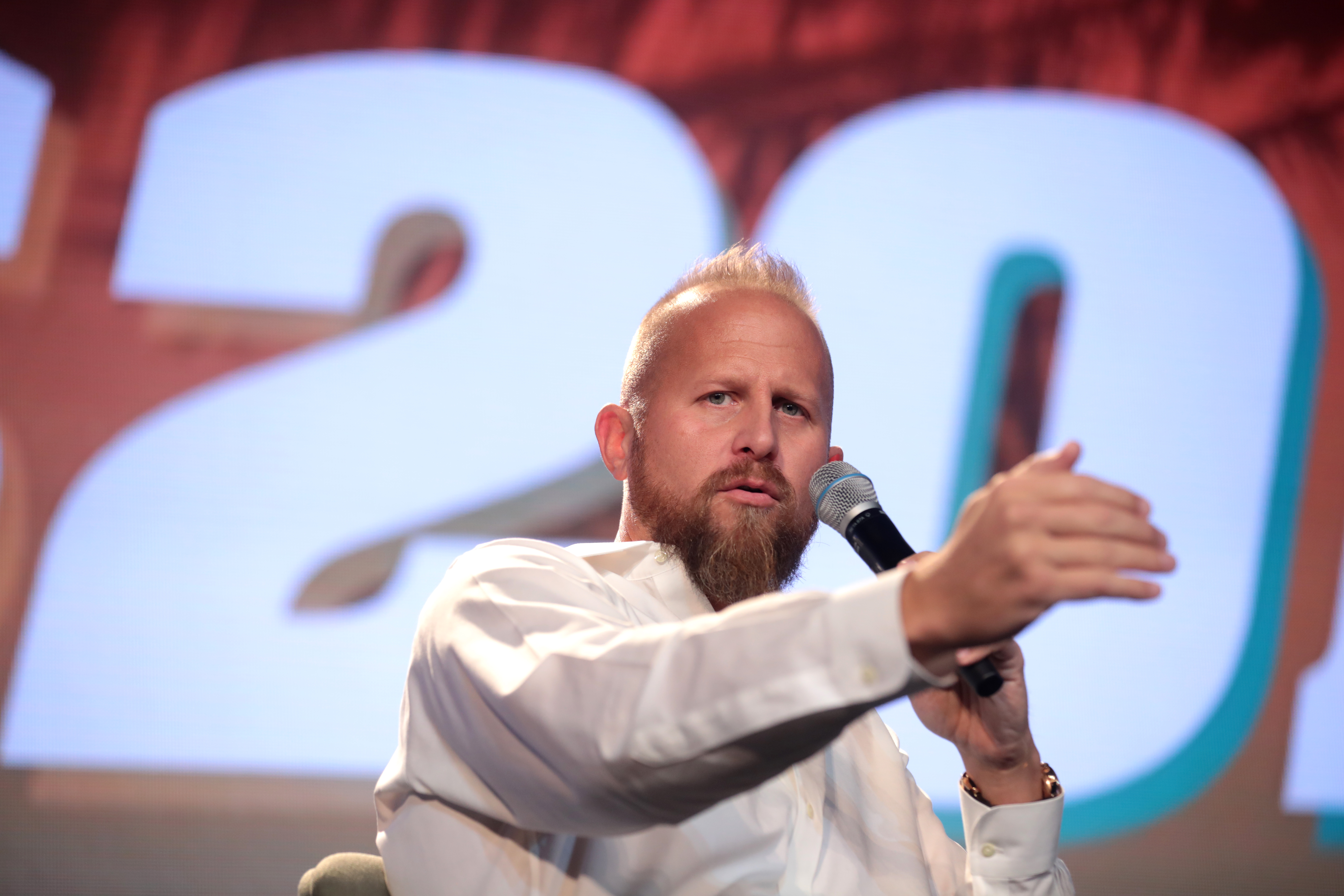
Parscale speaking at an event (the Turning Point USA Student Action Summit) in December 2018

The database of voter information that drove Parscale's social media advertising campaigns in the 2016 election was dubbed "Project Alamo", a name which eventually encompassed all of the associated fundraising and political advertising efforts.

=== 2020 Donald Trump presidential campaign ===
On February 27, 2018, President Trump named Parscale his 2020 re-election campaign manager.

On March 2, 2018, Parscale founded "firewall company" Red State Data and Digital to allow working with the America First super PAC during the midterm elections, which Parscale said did not violate election rules prohibiting coordination between a campaign and a super PAC. Red State received more than $900,000 in business from America First Action.

On August 30, 2019, CNN reported that a pro-Trump super PAC paid thousands to a company owned by Parscale's wife.

In March 2020, The New York Times reported that Parscale was paying $15,000 (~$18,359 in 2025) a month to Lara Trump and Kimberly Guilfoyle, the wife and girlfriend respectively of Eric Trump and Donald Trump Jr., for campaign work.

On April 29, 2020, CNN reported that Trump was angry with Parscale about low poll numbers.

In June 2020, while working to get supporters to an upcoming campaign rally with President Trump in Tulsa, Oklahoma, Parscale reported that he had received over 800,000 requests for tickets to the event, according to The Washington Times. Despite this claim, many seats remained empty at the 19,000-seat arena. The Tulsa fire marshal estimated that fewer than 6,200 attended. In December 2020, Politico named Parscale's predictions for the size of the rally among "the most audacious, confident and spectacularly incorrect prognostications about the year".

On July 15, 2020, Trump tweeted that Parscale would be replaced in the role of campaign manager by Bill Stepien, but that Parscale would continue to advise the campaign.

Parscale's spending decisions for the Trump campaign were questioned after his departure as campaign manager. By that time, more than $800,000 had been spent by the Trump campaign on boosting Parscale's social media pages, and $39 million had been paid to two companies owned by Parscale. The campaign also purchased ads which appeared to be intended to please Trump himself, including more than $1 million in ads for the Washington, D.C., media market. Parscale was the only one of Trump's first four campaign managers to give Trump's campaign a maximum contribution for the 2020 election. The New York Times reported that Parscale "was often the subject of unproven accusations from his colleagues — as well as Mr. Trump — that he was pocketing money from the campaign."

On September 30, 2020, Parscale provided a statement to Politico announcing that he was "stepping away from my company and any role in the campaign for the immediate future to focus on my family and get help dealing with the overwhelming stress"; campaign communications director Tim Murtaugh confirmed the statement.

=== Reaction to January 6th attack on the United States Capitol ===
On July 12, 2022, the seventh hearing of the January 6th Committee reported that after the attack, Parscale exchanged text messages with senior campaign advisor and "Save America" rally liaison Katrina Pierson. In these messages, Parscale equated Donald Trump's rhetoric with fomenting civil war and blamed his former boss for the death of supporter Ashli Babbitt. He expressed remorse for helping him become president:

Brad Parscale Texts
BRAD PARSCALE	JAN 6, 2021 7:14 PM
	This is about Trump pushing for uncertainty in this country
	A sitting president asking for civil war
	This week I feel guilty for helping him win
KATRINA PIERSON	JAN 6, 2021 7:20 PM
	You did what you felt was right at the time and therefore it was right
BRAD PARSCALE	JAN 6, 2021 7:20 PM
	Yeah. But a woman is dead
KATRINA PIERSON	JAN 6, 2021 7:21 PM
	You do realize this was going to happen
BRAD PARSCALE	JAN 6, 2021 7:21 PM
	Yeah. If I was Trump and knew my rhetoric killed someone.
KATRINA PIERSON	JAN 6, 2021 7:22 PM
	It wasn't the rhetoric.
BRAD PARSCALE	JAN 6, 2021 7:22 PM
	Katrina.
	Yes it was

One month later, Parscale tweeted the following message to his Twitter followers, but addressed it directly to the ex-president:

Statement to Trump:

"If they only impeached you twice, you need to run again. Because to change the system you have to kick it in the a#$. I would love to be the only President to be impeached three times. Because history remembers those that didn't conform.

I'm in, are you?"

=== Post-2020 election activities ===
After the election, Parscale criticized the Trump campaign's strategy following his removal as campaign manager. He argued that Trump's response to the COVID-19 pandemic ultimately led to his defeat, but echoed Trump's false claims of voter fraud as a factor.

After the election, Parscale turned to real estate flipping, restarted his political consulting firm, and formed a data analysis startup. In October 2021, he was working for the 2022 Ohio gubernatorial campaign of former Republican congressman Jim Renacci against incumbent Republican Governor Mike DeWine.

In January 2025, Parscale became chief strategy officer for Salem Media Group.

Parscale has assisted several political campaigns in South America, including those of Nasry Asfura, Javier Milei, Rodrigo Paz, and Flávio Bolsonaro.

=== Work for the Israeli government ===
In 2026, the Israeli government retained Parscale under a communications contract valued at more than $45 million through his company Clock Tower X. The campaign used digital advertising, public opinion research, websites and AI-assisted text conversations to address declining American support for Israel among U.S. conservatives. Parscale registered under the Foreign Agents Registration Act in connection with his work for the Israeli government.

Parscale's work included developing websites and digital content designed to improve the availability of pro-Israel information in search engines and generative AI systems. The campaign also used AI-assisted conversations to identify public concerns about Israel and report aggregate findings to the Israeli government. One component of the campaign used AI-assisted text conversations to solicit Americans' views on the U.S.–Israel relationship. The Wall Street Journal reported that millions of messages were distributed and that human personnel participated in the operation alongside automated systems.

Parscale began discussions with Israeli officials in late 2024 and subsequently traveled to Israel to brief government representatives on digital strategies for combating misinformation and antisemitism. Parscale described misinformation "from any side" as an existential threat to Israel. He denied allegations that the campaign was intended to undermine U.S. diplomatic negotiations with Iran.

== Personal life ==
Parscale became a father in July 1999, several weeks after graduating from college. His daughter's mother was a 22-year-old woman whom he had met while she was working at a San Antonio tanning salon. The couple married in March 2003. Parscale filed for divorce in August 2004; the divorce was finalized in October 2007.

In the summer of 2012, he married Candice Blount. The couple had a twin son and daughter who were born in 2016, but died shortly thereafter.

On September 27, 2020, Parscale was hospitalized after his wife told Fort Lauderdale police that he had guns and he was threatening to harm himself; upon arriving at Parscale's home, an officer reported that Parscale appeared to be distraught and under the influence of alcohol. Officers seized 10 firearms from the home and reported that Parscale's wife had cuts and bruises on her arms and face, which she said Parscale had inflicted earlier in the week, though she later said that her statements had been "misconstrued" and denied that Parscale had been violent toward her. Parscale was detained and involuntarily committed and psychiatrically examined under terms of the Baker Act. No charges were filed related to the incident, though a judge ordered Parscale to turn over his firearms, which he did. Politico reported that the couple had shared that they had felt distressed since the 2016 death of their prematurely born twins.
