= Clock Tower X =

American public relations company

Clock Tower X, LLC
- Type: Private
- Founder: Brad Parscale
- Website: clocktowerx.com

Clock Tower X is an American political public relations and digital influence firm founded by Brad Parscale, former campaign manager for Donald Trump, to work on behalf of the State of Israel in the United States.

Clock Tower X is among three American public relations companies hired by Israel's Ministry of Foreign Affairs to bolster its reputation in the United States.

== History and operations ==
On September 18, 2025, Parscale filed under the Foreign Agents Registration Act (FARA) as working on behalf of Israel, and registered Clock Tower X LLC. The Hill reported that Parscale was primarily corresponding with Israel's minister of Foreign Affairs and chief of staff at Israel's Ministry of Foreign Affairs Eran Shayovich.

Advertising firm Havas Media hired Clock Tower X to conduct a digital campaign on behalf of Israel. The company was tasked with uploading 100 pieces of original content monthly, with the majority targeting younger audiences on social media platforms and podcasts.

The campaign was publicly framed as "addressing rising online antisemitism." Time reported an Israeli Foreign Ministry official saying another strategic aim of the campaign is "preventing young conservatives from turning against Israel." In a Services Agreement draft included in the FARA filing, Parscale also pledged to amplify the campaign across social media and through "integration of narrative messaging into Salem Media Network properties and aligned distribution channels." Parscale is the chief strategy officer of Salem Media.

In an effort to influence the output of AI chatbots which train on data scraped from the open Internet, such as ChatGPT, Clock Tower X has created a number of pro-Israel websites.

Clock Tower X has also been responsible for millions of texts sent to U.S. cellphones by AI chatbots. The chatbots represent themselves as individuals associated with a peace organization, such as Friends for Peace or Partners in Peace, and say they are interested in "gathering views on Israel". Once the recipient engages in conversation, the chatbot will begin to "promote a pro-Israel message".

In October 2026, Clock Tower X sent mailers to Iowa residents in two different electoral districts promoting Israel's security relationship with the United States and economic benefits ahead of the 2026 midterm elections.

== See also ==
- Hasbara
- Bridges Partners
- Show Faith by Works
