= Foreign Agents Registration Act =

United States law regulating foreign lobbying

- Other short titles: Foreign Principal Registration Act of 1938
- Long title: An Act to require the registration of certain persons employed by agencies to disseminate propaganda in the United States and for other purposes.
- Acronyms (colloquial): FARA
- Nicknames: Foreign Propagandists Registration Act of 1938
- Enacted by: the 75th United States Congress
- Effective: September 6, 1938

Citations
- Public law: Pub. L. 75–583
- Statutes at Large: 52 Stat. 631

Codification
- Titles amended: 22 U.S.C.: Foreign Relations and Intercourse
- U.S.C. sections created: 22 U.S.C. ch. 11, subch. II § 611 et seq.

Legislative history
- Introduced in the House as H.R. 1591 by John William McCormack (D-MA) on July 28, 1937; Committee consideration by House Judiciary, Senate Foreign Relations; Passed the House on August 2, 1937 (Passed); Passed the Senate on May 18, 1938 (Passed); Reported by the joint conference committee on May 23, 1938; agreed to by the Senate on May 27, 1938 (Agreed) and by the House on June 2, 1938 (Agreed); Signed into law by President Franklin D. Roosevelt on June 8, 1938

The Foreign Agents Registration Act (FARA) (22 U.S.C. § 611 et seq.) is a United States law that imposes public disclosure obligations on persons representing foreign interests. It requires "foreign agents"—defined as individuals or entities engaged in domestic lobbying or advocacy for foreign governments, organizations, or persons ("foreign principals")—to register with the Department of Justice (DOJ) and disclose their relationship, activities, and related financial compensation.

FARA does not prohibit lobbying for foreign interests, nor does it ban or restrict any specific activities. Its explicit purpose is to promote transparency with respect to foreign influence over American public opinion, policy, and laws; to that end, the DOJ is required to make information concerning foreign agents' registrations and their disclosed activities on behalf of foreign principals publicly available. FARA was enacted in 1938 primarily to counter Nazi propaganda, with an initial focus on criminal prosecution of subversive activities; since 1966, enforcement has shifted mostly to civil penalties and voluntary compliance.

For most of its existence, FARA was relatively obscure and rarely invoked; since 2017, the law has been enforced with far greater regularity and intensity, particularly against officials connected to the Trump administration. Subsequent high-profile indictments and convictions under FARA have prompted greater public, political, and legal scrutiny, including calls for reform.

FARA is administered and enforced by the FARA Unit of the Counterintelligence and Export Control Section (CES) within the DOJ's National Security Division (NSD). Since 2016, there has been a 30 percent increase in registrations; as of November 2022, there were over 500 active foreign agents registered with the FARA Unit.

Several U.S. states have enacted or proposed legislation resembling the federal FARA, often referred to as "baby FARA" laws. These state-level initiatives aim to increase transparency around foreign influence in state politics and policymaking.

== Background ==
Foreign influence over American politics has been a recurring concern since the nation's founding. In 1796, prior to his retirement from the presidency, George Washington warned about foreign nations seeking to influence both the American government and the public, namely through local "tools and dupes". As early as 1808, the House of Representatives sought to investigate U.S. Army general James Wilkinson over allegations that he was a Spanish spy. In 1852, a joint resolution was introduced in Congress that invoked Washington's warning and reaffirmed the U.S. government's commitment "Against the insidious wiles of foreign influence".

Notwithstanding deeply rooted anxieties about foreign interference in American politics, it is not illegal for Americans to advocate for foreign governments or interests. The First Amendment to the U.S. Constitution enshrines the right to petition the government, including through political lobbying, and makes no distinction between citizens and noncitizens. As a result, efforts to address foreign influence have generally avoided censorship in favor of transparency. Only in 1917, shortly after the U.S. entered World War I, did Congress make the first formal attempts to regulate or restrict foreign lobbying, taking into consideration measures that would require foreign agents to publicly disclose their advocacy and prohibiting noncitizen residents from acting as foreign agents without prior government permission.

== History ==
In response to the rise of Nazism in 1930s Germany, the House created the Special Committee on Un-American Activities to address the growing concerns about foreign propaganda in the U.S. In particular the preeminent PR firm in the US at the time, Carl Byoir and Associates were contracted by the German Railroads Information Bureau in 1933, ostensibly to send out information promoting Germany as tourist destination. After the Nation revealed that Carl Byoir was paid $6,000 per month to influence media and public perception of Nazi Germany, the committee was tasked with conducting investigations into three issues: "(1) the extent, character, and objects of Nazi propaganda activities in the United States, (2) the diffusion within the United States of subversive propaganda that is instigated from foreign countries and attacks the principle of the form of government as guaranteed by our Constitution, and (3) all other questions in relation thereto that would aid Congress in any necessary remedial legislation."

Pursuant to the findings and recommendations of the committee, FARA was enacted in 1938 to target foreign propaganda and political subversion, particularly from Nazi sources abroad; foreign agents were implicated by the law regardless of whether they were acting "for or on behalf of" those interests. The law would not ban such activities but instead require that individuals engaged in propaganda on behalf of foreign governments and principals register with the government and disclose information about their clients, activities, and contract terms. Enforcement of the act was assigned to the Department of State, which opposed having such responsibility on the basis that it lacked the resources and personnel; consequently, authority over enforcing the act was transferred to the Department of Justice in 1942. A "Foreign Agents Registration Section" was created within the DOJ's newly established War Division during World War II, and a total of 23 criminal cases were prosecuted on the basis of FARA.

Following the end of the war in 1945, enforcement of FARA declined significantly: Only two indictments were brought between 1945 and 1955, followed by nine "failure to file" indictments between 1955 and 1962.

=== 1966 revision ===
In 1966 the Act was amended and narrowed to emphasize agents actually working with foreign powers who sought economic or political advantage by influencing governmental decision-making. The amendments shifted the focus of the law from propaganda to political lobbying and narrowed the meaning of "foreign agent". Consequently, an individual or organization could not be placed in the FARA database unless the government proved that they were acting "at the order, request, or under the direction or control, of a foreign principal" and proved that the alleged foreign agent engaged "in political activities for or in the interests of such foreign principal", including by "represent[ing] the interests of such foreign principal before any agency or official of the Government of the United States".

Due to the greater burden of proof placed on the government, until 2015, there only seven criminal prosecutions under FARA, none of which resulted in a conviction. However, a civil injunctive remedy also was added to allow the Department of Justice to warn individuals and entities of possible violations of the Act, ensuring more voluntary compliance while making it clear when the law has been violated. This has resulted in a shift from the law's initial focus on criminal prosecution, as the number of successful civil cases and administrative resolutions increased since that time.

=== 1995 revision ===
In 1995, the term "political propaganda" was removed from Subsection 611 following the 1987 Supreme Court case, Meese v. Keene, in which a California State Senator wanted to distribute three films from Canada about acid rain and nuclear war but felt his reputation would be harmed if the films were to be classified officially as "political propaganda". The court affirmed an earlier lower court ruling in favor of one of the film's distributors in Block v. Meese. The Lobbying Disclosure Act of 1995 provided exemptions under FARA for certain agents who register with Congress and are thereby permitted to lobby the legislative and executive branches directly.

=== Twenty-first century ===
An online database of FARA registrants was added by the Department of Justice. In 2004 the Justice Department stated that the FARA Unit's database for tracking foreign lobbyists was in disrepair; by 2007, it launched an online database which can be used by the public to search filings and current reports. That same year, the DOJ reported that there were approximately 1,700 lobbyists representing more than 100 countries before Congress, the White House, and federal agencies, many of whom were not registered under FARA.

Following a spike in public attention, registrations, and prominent cases in 2016, Foreign Affairs magazine declared, "FARA is no longer a forgotten and oft ignored piece of New Deal–era reforms. Eight decades after being enacted, FARA is finally worth the paper it was written on."

== Scope ==
The Act requires periodic disclosure of all activities and finances by:

- people and organizations that are under control of
  - a foreign government, or
  - of organizations or of persons outside of the United States ("foreign principal"),
- if they act "at the order, request, or under the direction or control" ("agents")
  - of this principal or
  - of persons who are "controlled or subsidized in major part" by this principal.

Organizations under such foreign control can include political agents, public relations counsel, publicity agents, information-service employees, political consultants, fundraisers or those who represent the foreign power before any agency or official of the United States government.

The law does not include news or press services not owned by the foreign principal. It also provides explicit exemptions for organizations engaged in "religious, scholastic, academic, or scientific pursuits or of the fine arts," as well as for those "not serving predominantly a foreign interest."

Examples of organizations lobbying on behalf of foreign governments are DMP International, Flynn Intel Group, DLA Piper, Dickens & Madson Canada, Invest Northern Ireland, Japan National Tourism Organization, Netherlands Board of Tourism and Conventions, Ketchum Inc., and Clock Tower X.

== Prominent cases ==
There have been several dozen criminal prosecutions and civil cases under the Act. Among the most prominent are:

- United States v. Peace Information Center, 97 F. Supp. 255 (D.D.C. 1951) in which the US government claimed that the peace organization led by Pan-Africanist African American Civil Rights activist W. E. B. Du Bois was spreading propaganda as an agent of foreign governments. The trial judge dismissed the case for lack of evidence.
- United States v. John Joseph Frank (D.D.C. 1959), where Frank's lack of registration as an agent of the Dominican Republic was aggravated by the fact that the defendant had been notified by letter of his burden to register.
- United States v. Park Tong-Sun (D.D.C. 1977) involved South Korea and was ended by a plea bargain.
- Attorney General v. Irish Northern Aid Committee (1981) in which the government sought to compel the committee, which was already registered under FARA, to register more specifically as an agent of the Irish Republican Army (IRA). The committee, based in Belfast, Northern Ireland which collected money from supporters in the U.S., denied a relationship with the IRA and claimed selective prosecution was based on the Attorney General's hostility towards their beliefs. While failing to do so in 1972, in May 1981, the U.S. Department of Justice won a court case forcing the committee to register with the IRA as its foreign principal, but the committee was allowed to include a written disclaimer against the court ruling.
- Attorney General v. The Irish People, Inc. (1986) in which the court found that the Irish Northern Aid Committee's publication The Irish People also must register under the Act and with the IRA as its foreign principal.
- United States v. McGoff, 831 F.2d 1071 (D.C. Cir. 1987) shortened the statute of limitations for agents who refuse to register, contrary to the express language in Section 8(e) of the Act.
- The "Cuban Five" (1998–2000): five Cuban intelligence officers were convicted of acting as agents of a foreign government under FARA, as well as various conspiracy charges after entering the United States to spy on the U.S. Southern Command and various Cuban-American groups thought to be committing terrorist acts in Cuba.
- United States v. Susan Lindauer et al (2004) involved a former U.S. Congressional staffer and journalist whom the U.S. government alleged had violated pre-war Iraq financial sanctions by taking payments from Iraqi intelligence operatives. In addition to charges under the FARA, Lindauer was indicted for Title 18 Section 2332d (financial crimes) and placed under the International Emergency Economic Powers Act (IEEPA). During and after her one-year incarceration, she was twice judged incompetent to stand trial. In September 2006, the district court denied the government’s application to administer antipsychotic medication to Lindauer involuntarily in an effort to restore her competency to stand trial. The case was dropped in 2009.
- United States v. Samir A. Vincent (2005) included a charge of conspiracy to act as an unregistered agent of a foreign government in the "oil-for-food" scandal helping Saddam Hussein's government. Samir was fined $300,000 and sentenced to probation.
- Syed Ghulam Nabi Fai, a U.S. citizen from India's Jammu and Kashmir, was arrested in 2011 by the Federal Bureau of Investigation for lobbying secretly for Pakistan's Inter-Services Intelligence agency. He later pleaded guilty to tax evasion and making false statements.
- On November 13, 2017, RT America officially registered as a foreign agent and was required to disclose financial information.
- The U.S. Justice Department in 2018 ordered the Chinese state-run Xinhua News Agency and China Global Television Network to register as foreign agents.
- The Overseas Friends of the BJP (OFBJP; BJP being the ruling Bharatiya Janata Party of India), after 29 years in operation in the United States, formally registered as a "foreign agent" on 27 August 2020.
- Elliott Broidy pled guilty in October 2020 to acting as an unregistered foreign agent, admitting to taking $9 million to secretly lobby the Trump administration on behalf of a private individual, a Malaysian national. On January 19, 2021, prior to sentencing, President Trump granted Broidy a full and unconditional pardon.
- On September 3, 2024, the U.S. Justice Department arrested and charged Linda Sun, a former high-ranking New York State official, with acting as an undisclosed agent of China and the Chinese Communist Party.
- In October 2025, Yaoning “Mike” Sun agreed to plead guilty to acting as an illegal agent for China while working as a campaign advisor for a Southern California politician. He was sentenced to four years in prison in February 2026.
- In September 2025, Yuanjun Tang pleaded guilty to conspiring to act as an unregistered agent of the PRC. He had been an imprisoned dissident in China and allegedly infiltrated numerous Chinese dissident groups in the U.S.
- In June 2026, American journalist Thomas Pauken II, son of Texas politician Tom Pauken, pleaded guilty to acting as an unregistered agent for China. He allegedly worked under the direction of individuals associated with China's Ministry of State Security since 2019 without registering under FARA. His sentencing was scheduled for September 2026.
- A 2026 investigation by Haaretz uncovered FARA filings that revealed a network of digital advertising campaigns, public relations firms, and influencers operating on behalf of Israel. According to the documents, Israel retained Havas, a multinational advertising agency, as well as a company owned by Brad Parscale, a former campaign manager for Donald Trump, to run digital advertising aimed at improving Israel's image regarding its military operations in Gaza and its war against Iran. The campaign specifically targeted right-wing American audiences. The filings documented significant payments for these activities, along with additional contracts awarded to Washington-based law and public relations firms, totaling tens of millions of dollars in documented commitments through American companies. An American nonprofit organization also received funding to bring influencers to Israel for public diplomacy visits.

== Notable organizations listed by the United States as foreign agents ==
- CGTN America
- China Daily
- China Global Television Network
- Clock Tower X
- RT (TV network)
- Sing Tao Daily
- Xinhua News Agency

== Related legislation ==
FARA is one of several federal statutes aimed at persons called foreign agents. The Taiwan Relations Act and the Compact of Free Association with the Federated States of Micronesia and the Marshall Islands authorize the exemption of otherwise covered agents. Additionally, there have been laws targeting specific foreign agents, such as the 1981 closure of the Palestine Liberation Organization office in Washington, D.C. as well as Executive Order 12947, issued by President Bill Clinton on January 23, 1995, which enacted a prohibition against fundraising within the United States on behalf of certain violent groups opposed to the Israeli–Palestinian peace process. The Antiterrorism and Effective Death Penalty Act of 1996 prohibits, among other activities, domestic fundraising that benefits foreign organizations designated by the United States as terrorist.

== Allegations of selective enforcement ==
Although the act was designed to apply to any foreign agent, it has been accused of being used to target countries out of favor with a given administration. This was alleged by the Irish Northern Aid Committee in legal filings. In the 1980s, the Federal Bureau of Investigation (FBI) conducted operations against the Committee in Solidarity with the People of El Salvador (CISPES) allegedly based on selective enforcement of FARA. It has been noted that during the same period it investigated CISPES, the FBI ignored possible FARA violations such as Soldier of Fortune magazine running back cover advertisements to help the Rhodesian national army recruit fighters.

In the 1950s President Eisenhower's administration repeatedly demanded that leaders of the American Zionist Council register as "agents of a foreign government." In November 1962 Attorney General Robert F. Kennedy's Department of Justice ordered the American Zionist Council to register as a foreign agent under FARA because it was funded by the Jewish Agency for Israel and thereby acting on behalf of Israel; the Department of Justice later withdrew its demand.

A 2023 article in The Nation stated that FARA "has been used as a tool to go after such anti-war and human rights organizations as the Irish Northern Aid Committee, the Committee in Solidarity with the People of El Salvador, and Palestine Information Office. [I]n 2018, the Republican-controlled House Committee on Natural Resources initiated FARA inquiries against four environmental advocacy organizations, including Earthjustice and the Natural Resources Defense Council".

The American Zionist Council was reorganized as the American Israel Public Affairs Committee (AIPAC). In 1988 former Senator William Fulbright and former senior CIA official Victor Marchetti unsuccessfully petitioned the Department of Justice to register the lobby under the Act.

The 2005 case, United States v. Franklin, Rosen, and Weissman, against United States Department of Defense employee Larry Franklin, AIPAC policy director Steven Rosen, and AIPAC senior Iran analyst Keith Weissman, raised the possibility that AIPAC would come under greater scrutiny by the Department of Justice. While Franklin pleaded guilty to passing government secrets to Rosen and Weissman, as well as to an Israeli government official, the cases against Rosen and Weissman were dismissed and no actions against AIPAC were instituted.

Leaked documents from the Israeli ministry of Justice revealed that in 2018 the ministry was concerned that compliance with FARA would damage the reputation of Israeli-directed American groups, and that political donors would be reluctant to fund them if registered under the law. The ministry thus sought legal advice on FARA from law firm Sandler Reiff, from 2018 through at least 2022. The proposed solution was for Israel to create and fund a new American nonprofit organization that would be informally managed by the Israeli government.

== Proposed reform ==
There have been proposals to reform FARA to both improve its enforcement and modernize its provisions. In September 2016, the U.S. Department of Justice Office of the Inspector General released an audit of the National Security Division's enforcement of FARA. The audit noted that NSD officials had proposed amending FARA to provide the Justice Department with civil investigative demand authority to better enforce the Act, and to eliminate the Lobbying Disclosure Act exemption to improve compliance. The Department of Justice has also proposed expanding civil enforcement under the statute.

Nonprofits have complained that the broad definitions in FARA can capture much routine nonprofit activity, requiring them to potentially register as foreign agents. In response, there have been proposals to amend the Act to define foreign principals under the Act to only be foreign governments or political parties or those operating on their behalf, as well as amend the current broad and unclear agency definition in FARA to instead mimic the Restatement of the Law of Agency, Third definition.

In July 2020, Attorney General William Barr warned U.S. companies and executives that advocating on behalf of Chinese government interests may violate FARA requirements. In November 2021, Reuters reported that the Chinese embassy in Washington, D.C. sent letters to American executives urging them to lobby against bills seeking to enhance U.S. economic competitiveness, thereby sparking possible FARA concerns.

== Chronology of amendments ==
Chronology of amendments to the Foreign Agents Registration Act of 1938.

Date of enactment	Public Law number	U.S. Statute citation	U.S. legislative bill	U.S. presidential administration
August 7, 1939	P.L. 76-319	53 Stat. 1244	H.R. 5988	Franklin D. Roosevelt
April 29, 1942	P.L. 77-532	56 Stat. 248	S. 2399	Franklin D. Roosevelt
August 3, 1950	P.L. 81-642	64 Stat. 399	H.R. 4386	Harry S. Truman
October 4, 1961	P.L. 87-366	75 Stat. 784	H.R. 470	John F. Kennedy
July 4, 1966	P.L. 89-486	80 Stat. 244	S. 693	Lyndon B. Johnson

== Baby FARA laws ==
In recent years, Georgia, Arizona, Utah, Illinois, Oklahoma, Tennessee, West Virginia, California, and New York proposed or implemented state FARA legislation on foreign-influenced political activity, such as political contributions in these states.

In April 2025, Arkansas enacted its Baby FARA law, which requires representatives of "hostile foreign principals" (China, Russia, North Korea, and Iran) to register with the state. In May 2025, Nebraska passed a bill establishing registration and reporting requirements for individuals or organizations acting as agents of foreign principals from adversary nations or terrorist organizations in Nebraska.

== See also ==
- Alien and Sedition Acts
- Foreign agent § Legality, for similar laws in other countries
- Foreign Influence Transparency Scheme Act 2018
- Lobbying in the United States
- Russian foreign agent law – 2012 Russian law
- Smith Act
- 2023–2024 Georgian protests, which stemmed from a foreign agent law proposal in the country of Georgia
