= Hasbara =

Public relations work by the State of Israel

Examples of Hasbara

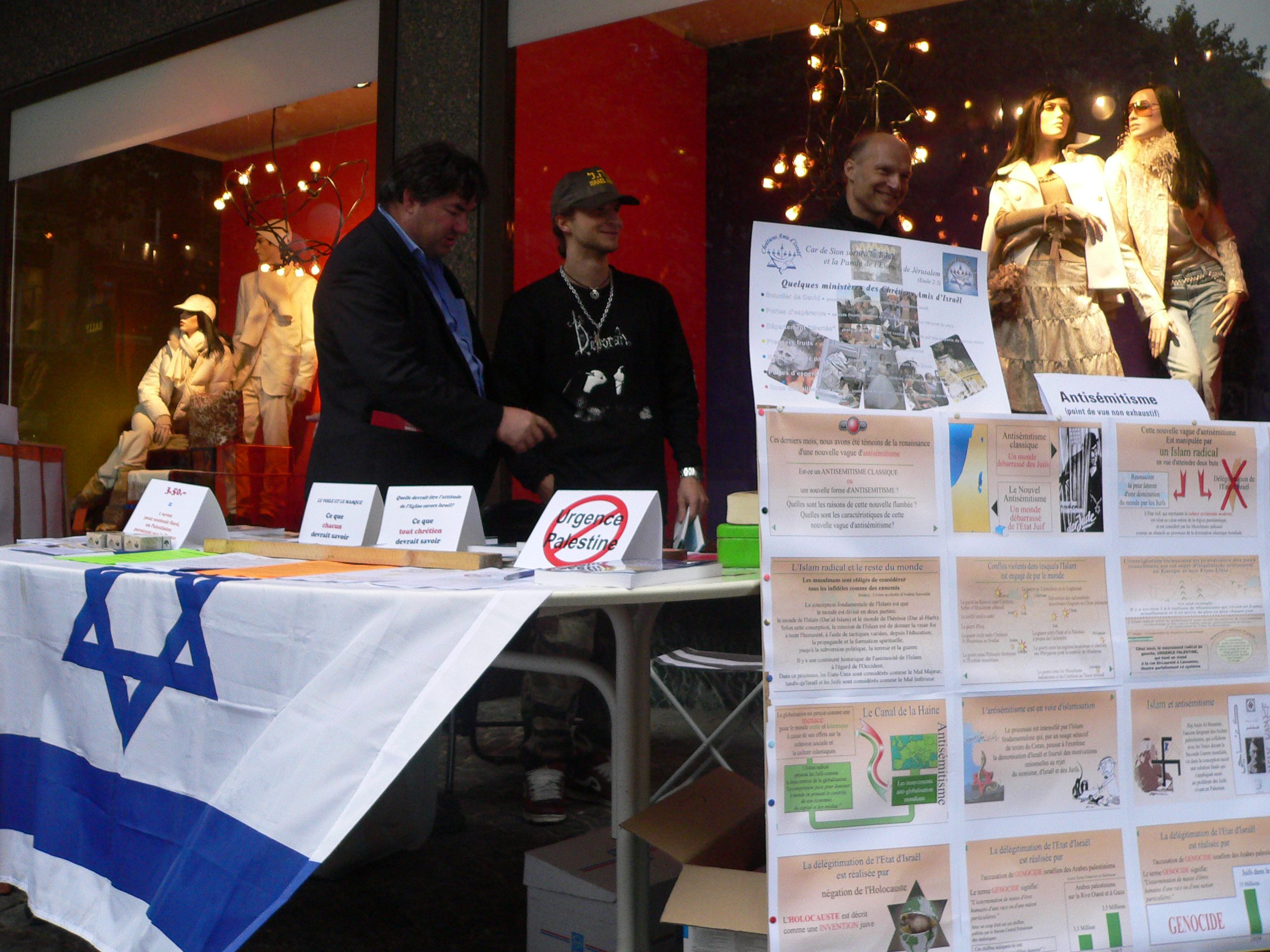
An example of a Hasbara stand

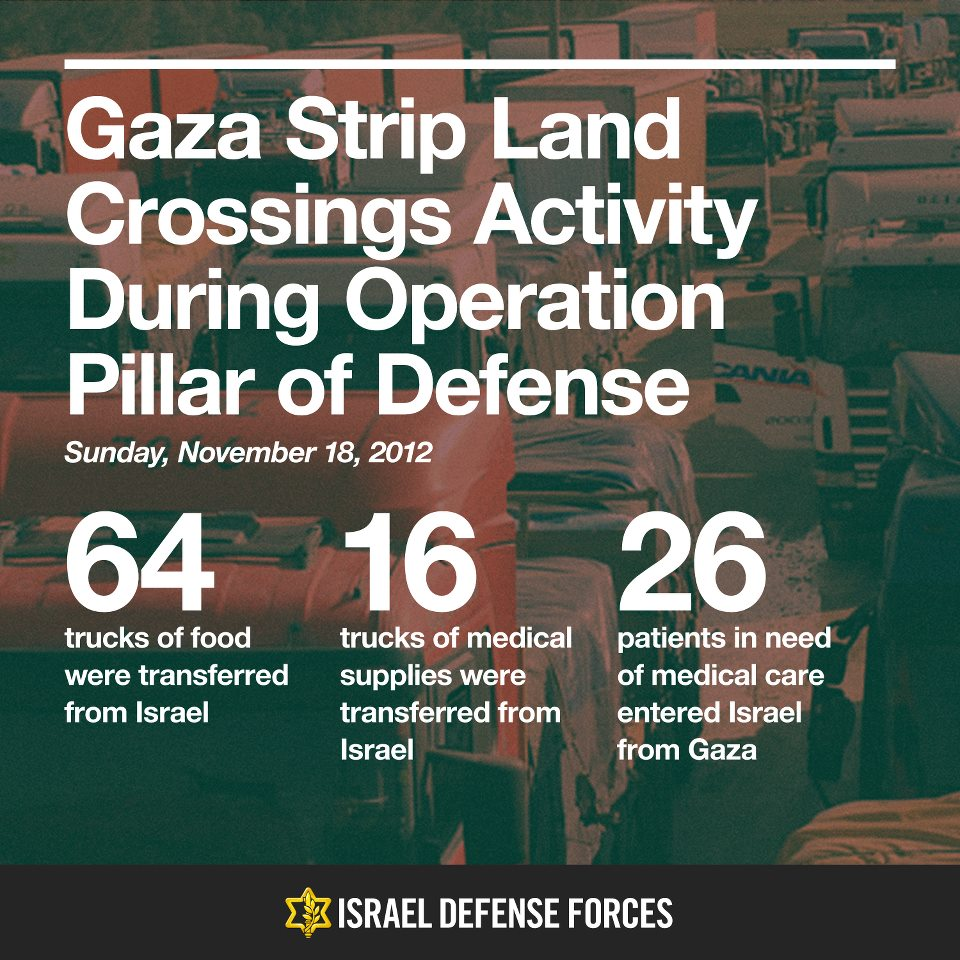
Hasbara efforts often use IDF posters.

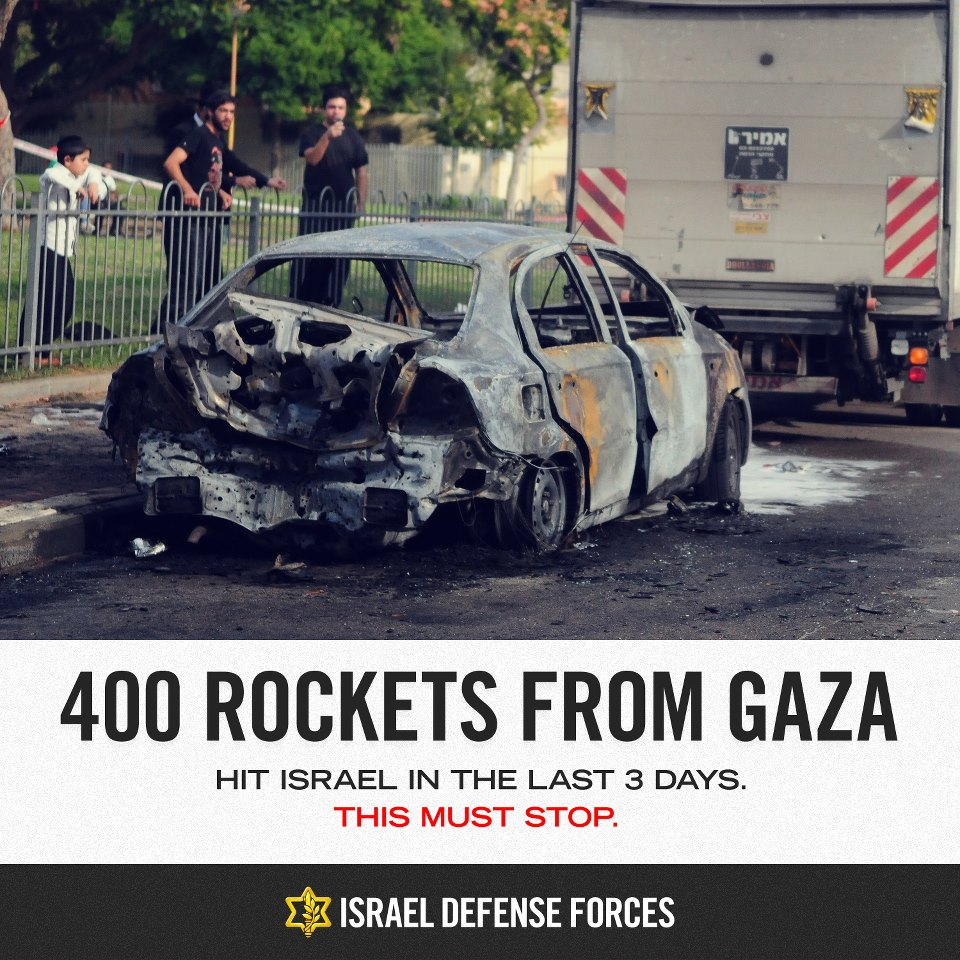
An example of a Hasbara poster

Hasbara (Hebrew: הַסְבָּרָה), or hasbarah, is the Modern Hebrew word for the public diplomacy of Israel, which may involve mass communication, individual interaction with foreign nationals through social and traditional media, and cultural diplomacy. Organizations that promote Israel include the IDF Spokesperson's Unit, the National Public Diplomacy Directorate at the Israeli Prime Minister's Office, Ministry of Foreign Affairs, and pro-Israel civil society organizations. Zionist organizations originally used the term propaganda to describe such public advocacy. Early Zionist leader Nahum Sokolow introduced the term "hasbara", which literally means "explaining". By the eve of World War II, official Zionist institutions began adopting "hasbara" in place of "propaganda". In English, the word is used by some as a derogatory synonym for "Zionist propaganda", and it is more widely used to mean any state-sponsored propaganda, as in "Chinese hasbara" or "Turkish hasbara".

== Characteristics ==
Different terms have been used to describe Israel's and other actors' efforts to reach audiences abroad. Hasbara was formally introduced to the Zionist vocabulary by Nahum Sokolow. Hasbara (Hebrew: הַסְבָּרָה) means "explaining". As it focuses on providing explanations about one's actions, hasbara has been called a "reactive and event-driven approach". Most early practitioners of what became known as hasbara were Arabic-speaking Jews who published papers in Arabic to explain Zionism's goals to Arabs. These efforts were led by Arabic-speaking Jews such as Nissim Malul, Shimon Moyal, Esther Moyal, Avraham Elmalih, and Yehuda Burla. In 2003, Ron Schleifer called hasbara "a positive-sounding synonym for 'propaganda'".

Israeli public diplomacy groups tend not to use the word hasbara. They consider a focus on "explaining" too defensive and prefer to actively determine the agenda by being less reactive and more proactive, moving to a more comprehensive, long-term strategic approach. Israeli public diplomacy encompasses different forms of communication and other forms of interaction with the public abroad. For instance, Israel engages in open and fully attributable, unidirectional mass communication that targets so far unaffiliated civil populations in other countries (sometimes defined as "external communication"), both via social media and traditional mass media. The Israeli government uses this type of communication especially to depict Israel positively (a communication strategy Hirschberger calls "branding"). The Israeli government and pro-Israeli groups also use interventive communication to counter what they see as attempts at delegitimisation of Israel, e.g., in the context of BDS. The Israeli government also engages in cultural diplomacy. The communicative efforts of pro-Israeli civil society groups are partially also called "advocacy".

Edward Said wrote in 2001 that hasbara methods used during the Second Intifada included lunches and free trips for influential journalists; seminars for Jewish university students; invitations to members of Congress; pamphlets and money for election campaigns; telling photographers and writers what to photograph or write about; lecture and concert tours by prominent Israelis; frequent references to the Holocaust; and newspaper advertisements attacking Arabs and praising Israel.

In 2012, the Israeli Foreign Ministry published new guidelines on the appropriate use of social media methods by its diplomatic staff. This was prompted by multiple embarrassing and inappropriate tweets and posts by Israeli diplomats, such as one instance when the Israeli embassy in Dublin used its Twitter account to disparage Knesset member Haneen Zoabi over remarks she had made while visiting Ireland. After these incidents, Foreign Ministry Digital Diplomacy Department head Yoram Murad sent out a message to Israeli diplomats titled "What is the difference between a press briefing and a tweet?", the first sentence of which read, "As far as you're concerned, there is no difference".

=== Sources for disseminating information ===
Various branches of the Israeli government as well as pro-Israeli civil society organizations engage in public diplomacy efforts. The Spokesperson's Unit of the Israeli Defense Forces (IDF) plays a central role in the Israeli government's public diplomacy. The IDF's English-language Facebook page is one of the most-followed army social media pages worldwide. The unit has become Israel's largest spokesperson unit, with more than 400 officers, civilians and soldiers. There is also a reserve unit of almost 1,200 soldiers and officers. As of 2017, the unit has 15 staff members that are responsible only for the IDF's social media platforms to reach audiences abroad. As of 2015, the IDF is active on 30 different social media platforms.

The Coordinator of Government Activities in the Territories (COGAT), the IDF unit responsible for coordination and liaison with the Palestinian Authority, has a spokesperson's unit of its own as well as its own social media channels in English and Arabic. Within the Israeli Prime Minister's Office (PMO), the Government Press Office (GPO), the Public Diplomacy Directorate and the National Information Directorate are involved in public diplomacy efforts. The National Information Directorate is in charge of coordinating "the public diplomacy activities of various governmental bodies in foreign and security affairs, and on socioeconomic issues". The Public Diplomacy Directorate is responsible for communicating the prime minister's and the government's policies and decisions. The directorate is headed by the prime minister's media advisor.

The Israeli Ministry of Foreign Affairs (MFA) executes foreign public diplomacy primarily through its Public Diplomacy Directorate. The directorate is organized into three main divisions: Media and Public Affairs, Cultural Affairs and Scientific Cooperation, and the Bureau for Religious Affairs and Relations with the Jewish Diaspora. Within the Media and Public Affairs Division, specialized departments handle distinct operational areas, including nation branding, intelligence gathering, visual media production, global mission policy briefings, and press relations via the spokesperson's bureau. The division also includes departments dedicated to academic outreach and civil society engagement, with a primary focus on countering the Boycott, Divestment and Sanctions movement. International online communications and social media operations are managed by the ministry's Digital Diplomacy Department.

Various pro-Israel civil society organizations and initiatives in Israel and abroad support Israeli public diplomacy efforts. Prominent examples are StandWithUs, the American Israel Public Affairs Committee (AIPAC), the Washington Institute for Near East Policy (WINEP), the Anti-Defamation League (ADL), Christians United for Israel (CUFI), the Israel on Campus Coalition, the AMCHA Initiative, and The David Project. In 2010, the Israeli Ministry of Information and Diaspora Affairs launched the PR campaign "Masbirim Israel". The campaign intended to encourage Israeli citizens to contribute to improving Israel's image by talking with their international contacts about the country.

=== In the United States ===
According to The Israel Lobby and U.S. Foreign Policy by John Mearsheimer and Stephen Walt, major American Jewish organizations have played a significant role in advancing an Israeli state narrative to the American public. They quote Rabbi Alexander M. Schindler, former chair of the Conference of Presidents of Major American Jewish Organizations, saying: "The Presidents' Conference and its members have been instruments of official governmental Israeli policy. It was seen as our task to receive directions from government circles and to do our best no matter what to affect the Jewish community." Similarly, they quote Hyman Bookbinder, a high-ranking official of the American Jewish Committee, as saying: "Unless something is terribly pressing, really critical or fundamental, you parrot Israel's line in order to retain American support. As American Jews, we don't go around saying Israel is wrong about its policies."

According to Shivi Greenfield and Nachman Shai, the Israeli government (particularly the Ministry of Foreign Affairs, the former Ministry of Public Diplomacy & Diaspora Affairs, and the Ministry of Tourism) has worked with various Israeli and international non-government organizations to promote Israeli public diplomacy within the global Jewish diaspora and international community. Notable Israeli NGOs involved in public diplomacy have included the Jewish Agency for Israel, Israel Project, HonestReporting, the Middle East Media Research Institute (MEMRI), and Palestinian Media Watch (PMW). The Israeli government has also partnered with several Jewish and Christian Zionist NGOs in the U.S. and abroad, including the Anti-Defamation League (ADL), American Israel Public Affairs Committee (AIPAC), American Jewish Committee (AJC), the Conference of Presidents of Major American Jewish Organizations, Christians United for Israel (CUFI), the Jewish Federations of North America (JFNA), and the Zionist Organization of America (ZOA).

According to Greenfield and Shai, the Israeli government and sympathetic NGOs, including Hillel International, B'nai B'rith, Israel at Heart, and StandWithUs, have sought to promote sympathy for Israel among university students through study tours (such as Birthright Israel and Masa Israel), talks, meetings, distributing educational materials, distributing educational materials, gift packages, fundraising, and blood donations. These campus outreaches seek to strengthen ties between Israel and the Jewish diaspora and support Jewish students' efforts to combat so-called "anti-Israel" activism on campus such as Israeli Apartheid Week. Shai identifies the "Israel on Campus Coalition" as the umbrella organization for most pro-Israel American campus organizations. It is funded by the Schusterman Foundation and Hillel.

Israeli officials have emphasized the importance of molding American public opinion to influence U.S. foreign policy favorably toward Israel. For example, Prime Minister Benjamin Netanyahu has said, "In the last 30 years, I appeared innumerable times in the American media and met thousands of American leaders. I developed a certain ability to influence public opinion." Netanyahu said this in the context of the Israeli government's decade-long effort to pressure for military action against Iran. He added that this "is the most important thing: the ability to sway public opinion in the United States against the regime in Iran."

=== In Australia ===
According to Shahar Burla, the Israeli Foreign and Public Diplomacy ministries worked with local Australian Jewish community and Zionist organizations such as the local chapter of the United Israel Appeal, the Australasian Union of Jewish Students, the Zionist Council of New South Wales, and the New South Wales Jewish Board of Deputies to mobilize Australian Jews into supporting Israeli hasbara efforts during the 2010 Gaza flotilla raid. The Ministry of Public Diplomacy and Diaspora Affairs established a "Communications Room" to circulate pro-Israel information to the global Jewish diaspora via email, websites, traditional media, meetings, and demonstrations. Pro-Israel sympathizers were encouraged to share pro-Israel videos and articles on social media platforms, respond to blogs and TV shows, and write editorial letters.

== History ==
=== 19th century – 1948 ===
Among early Zionists it was common to label communicative efforts propaganda. Theodor Herzl used the term at the 3rd Zionist Congress in 1899, where he asked fellow Zionists in the audience "to engage in propaganda". The propaganda wing of the Irgun was a substantial proportion of the organization.

=== 1970–1999 ===
Early mentions of the term hasbara in English mainstream print media date from the late 1970s and describe it as "overseas image-building". According to The Washington Post, this work "is called hasbara when the purpose is to reshape public opinion abroad". In the early 1980s, hasbara was defined as a "public relations campaign". In Newsweek it was described as "explaining". In 1986, The New York Times reported that a program for "communicating defense goals" was started in the late 1970s, and a 1984 implementation of a "Hasbara Project" to "train foreign-service officers in communications by placing them with American companies". Carl Spielvogel, chairman of Backer & Spielvogel, traveled to Israel to advise the government on communicating its defense goals. The trip led to the Hasbara Project, an internship program established to train foreign-service officers in communications by placing them with American companies.

Shmuel Katz's book Battleground: Fact and Fantasy in Palestine, published in 1973, was described as "an encyclopedic source-book for those involved in Israel's hasbara (public relations) effort" by Moshe Phillips, a national director of Herut North America's U.S. section. In 1977, Prime Minister Menachem Begin named Katz "Adviser to the Prime Minister of Information Abroad".

In May 1992, The Jerusalem Post reported that American Jewish leaders hardly reacted to news that the Foreign Ministry's hasbara department would be eliminated as part of a sweeping reorganization of the ministry. Malcolm Hoenlein noted there had been talk of streamlining the ministry's hasbara functions for some time. He said that merging the hasbara department's functions with those of the press department did not portend any downgrading in the priority the Likud government gives to hasbara abroad. Abe Foxman reacted similarly, saying he was "not distressed or disturbed", and noted that disseminating hasbara has always been the responsibility of every Foreign Ministry staff officer, especially those working abroad; if eliminating one department means everyone will assume greater responsibility for his or her own efforts in distributing hasbara, then he is all in favor. It also reported that personnel in foreign hasbara departments would be shifted to press departments, which is where much of the work currently done by hasbara officials properly belongs. He explained that Israel's efforts to provide hasbara abroad would focus on media communications.

=== 2000–2005 ===
In 2001, Shmuel Katz published a retrospective of Israeli hasbara efforts and said that hasbara "must be tackled not by occasional sudden sallies but by a separate permanent department in the government." Sharon did increase hasbara efforts, but did not create a cabinet-level ministry for that purpose. Also in 2001, the Israeli Foreign Affairs Ministry, the diplomatic arm of the Government of Israel, was a co-sponsor of the Hasbara Fellowships activities of Aish HaTorah.

In 2002, the Israeli State Comptroller's office issued a report critical of Israel's PR efforts. "A lack of an overall strategic public relations conception and objective" and lack of coordination between the various organizations were mentioned. Funding levels are modest; the Ministry of Foreign Affairs spent about US$8.6 million on these efforts in 2002, and the Government Press Office was budgeted at US$100,000.

==== Depictions of children ====
In 2002, during the Second Intifada, the Israeli military used an image of a Palestinian toddler dressed as a suicide bomber as part of its public diplomacy. The photo the IDF provided to international media allegedly showed an 18-month-old child dressed as a suicide bomber. The BBC published the photo but said, "there was no independent confirmation of the authenticity of the photograph". The IDF claimed to have found the photo in a private family photo album while raiding a suspect's home. Dawn News reported that the photo was found in the home of a wanted militant named "Al Khalil". According to BBC News, the child's grandfather, Redwan Abu Turki, said the costume was from a rally at the university and "the picture was taken just for the fun of it". Israeli newspapers published the photo under headlines such as "Terror in Diapers" and "Born to Kill". The image was also shown on Israeli television.

A senior adviser to Israeli Prime Minister Ariel Sharon said, "The photograph of the baby suicide bomber symbolizes the incitement and hatred which the Palestinian leadership have been using to brainwash an entire generation of Palestinian children who have, unfortunately, taken in this message like mother's milk". Saeb Erekat, a Palestinian negotiator and cabinet minister said, "These are lies that they use to cover their own crimes, the murder of our children ... This week alone, six children were killed at the hands of Israeli forces".

The IDF obtained the photo from a family photo album and only used in it public diplomacy; there was no suggestion that photo had been used in Palestinian media or any other organized public communications by Palestinians. Palestinian officials dismissed it as a propaganda trick, Haaretz reported that a Palestinian journalist in the Hebron area said she did not believe the picture was fake and expressed surprise at the furor it caused in Israel, saying: "I can find you many, many photos like this. Many kids imitate adults and wear toy masks and guns, especially during marches. It's not strange at all". She added that she had seen children as young as the one in the photograph wearing similar costumes: "In our society it happens a lot. It's a kind of phenomenon".

The BBC report said it was "not uncommon" for Palestinian children to dress as bombers, but did not give other examples. Other photos of Palestinian children dressed up as militants, but not suicide bombers, were published in the same BBC report, including a photo of two boys wearing militant insignia and holding what looked like guns, captioned: "The militants are heroes for many Palestinian children". Children on both sides of the conflict see combatants from their own side as "heroes" and dress up as them. In 2024 (during the Gaza war), the most popular Purim costume for children in Israel was an IDF soldier. The Jerusalem Post reported a "trend towards choosing real-life heroes over fictional ones" to dress up as for Purim. The IDF costumes were controversial in the Jewish diaspora.

=== 2005–2014 ===
In 2008, Yarden Vatikay was appointed to coordinate Israel's domestic and foreign media policy. In 2009, Israel's foreign ministry organized volunteers to add pro-Israeli commentary on news websites.

A 2010 report produced for the Israeli cabinet by the Reut Institute and cited by the newspaper Haaretz exemplifies the common Israeli view that hasbara efforts are needed to respond to what it describes as a diffuse "delegitimization network" of anti-Israel activists. As Haaretz put it, "The network's activists—'delegitimizers' the report dubs them—are relatively marginal: young people, anarchists, migrants and radical political activists." The newspaper also cites the report as saying this network promotes pro-Palestinian activities in Europe as "trendy", and calls for it to be monitored by Israeli intelligence services, and for the cabinet to treat the network as a strategic threat. It concludes that Israel was not prepared to meet the threat this network posed and that a counter-effort must be more vigorously undertaken to respond to it.

Neil Lazarus said in 2012 that what he calls "low budget, grassroots Hasbara 2.0" has come of age, and commends websites that keep track of what supporters see as anti-Israel media bias, and that promote email campaigns on Israel's behalf. He observes that "Israel's hasbara seems to be becoming more dynamic, as the Diaspora takes responsibility", and that "Even day schools and MASA programs have been conscripted to the task."

=== 2014–present ===
==== Hamas is ISIS ====
"Hamas is ISIS" was first asserted by Benjamin Netanyahu near the end of the 2014 Gaza War. Some Israeli journalists criticized and mocked the comparison. Netanyahu was particularly criticised for including real ISIS propaganda in his social media posts promoting the analogy, including photos of James Foley from an ISIS beheading video.

In a 2014 speech at the United Nations, Netanyahu said, "Hamas is ISIS and ISIS is Hamas". In reference to this, the head of the Department of Political Science at Hebron University said it was "dangerous" to conflate Hamas and ISIS. Israeli journalists argued that Hamas resembles the Irgun and Lehi more closely than it does ISIS.

In the first days of the Israeli invasion of the Gaza Strip in October 2023, The Jerusalem Post quoted Netanyahu saying: "They are savages. Hamas is ISIS". The article then highlighted some alleged similarities in the groups' influences identified by Harel Chorev of the Moshe Dayan Center for Middle Eastern Studies at Tel Aviv University. During the first week of Israeli bombing of Gaza, Netanyahu included this assertion in a public addresses in the United States made alongside Secretary Antony Blinken. Netanyahu said, "Hamas is ISIS, and just as ISIS was crushed, so too will Hamas be crushed." In October 2023, he used the analogy to suggest there was a global coalition resembling that of the war against the Islamic State.

International military experts and mainstream international media pointed out major differences, particularly relating to nationalism, Shia Islam, Christianity, democracy, and destruction of cultural heritage. ISIS wants a purely theocratic system of government without any element of democracy, and violently attacks Christians, whereas Hamas participated in the 2006 Palestinian legislative election and the Hamas-led electoral list that won the election included a Palestinian Christian running for the Christian reserved seat in Gaza City. Talal Abu Zarifa, a leader from the DFLP (a secular faction allied with Hamas), said Israel was using the comparison to "justify its annihilation of Palestinian people and bloodshed". Some commentators pointed out some commonalities, such as that both are on the list of designated terrorist groups in the United States and United Kingdom, but still stressed the groups' very different ideological goals. Only a few pro-government Israeli sources agreed that Hamas and ISIS are comparable.

ISIS itself has a history of skillful social media use, including hijacking hashtags. The hashtag "#TheWestIsNext" began to trend in October 2023, signifying that Hamas's enemy was not only the State of Israel and that Israel was actually fighting to protect the entire Western world. But Hamas is a localized Palestinian nationalist group with distinctly different goals and strategies than those of international terror groups such as ISIS and al-Qaeda.

==== AI and digital influence campaign ====
In 2025, Israel's Ministry of Foreign Affairs launched a major public diplomacy campaign in the U.S. focused on reshaping online discourse and improving Israel's image among younger audiences amid growing criticism of its military operations in Gaza. As part of this effort, the ministry signed a $6 million agreement with Brad Parscale's firm Clock Tower X to produce digital content and influence how artificial intelligence systems, including large language models (LLMs), respond to topics involving Israel. According to filings under the U.S. Foreign Agents Registration Act (FARA), Clock Tower was hired to help "combat antisemitism" and support Israel's broader public diplomacy goals. The campaign is part of a broader initiative called "Project 545", referring to a government decision to allocate 545 million shekels (about $145 million) to international public relations and digital outreach in 2025.

Clock Tower's work includes developing websites and digital materials designed to influence how generative AI systems (such as ChatGPT, Gemini, and Grok) respond to queries related to Israel. This strategy, which some analysts call "generative engine optimization", seeks to seed the Web with curated sources and narratives that LLMs can ingest, potentially shaping how they frame politically sensitive issues. Clock Tower will also use AI-powered search engine optimization software to improve the visibility and ranking of relevant narratives on platforms like Google and Bing. Official targets for the campaign include achieving at least 50 million impressions per month, with over 80% of the content tailored to Generation Z audiences via TikTok, Instagram, YouTube, podcasts, and other digital channels.

The campaign is led in part by Brad Parscale, former digital strategist for Donald Trump's presidential campaigns, who serves as head of Clock Tower and as Chief Strategy Officer at Salem Media Group, a conservative Christian broadcasting network that is also participating in the initiative. In FARA filings, Israel's main point of contact for the campaign is Eran Shayovich, Chief of Staff at the Ministry of Foreign Affairs, who said the effort is intended to "amplify Israel's strategic communication and public diplomacy efforts."

Several other firms have been recruited as part of Israel's expanding U.S. outreach network. Show Faith by Works, a company owned by Republican consultant Chad Schnitger, submitted a proposal for a $3 million campaign targeting churches and Christian organizations in the western U.S. The plan aims to reverse declining support for Israel among evangelicals through biblically framed messaging that links Christian faith to backing the Jewish state. Another firm, SKDK, signed a contract worth roughly 2.5 million shekels to create bot networks designed to "flood the zone" on social media with pro-Israel messaging. The Tourism Ministry also hired Targeted Communications Global for a $1.2 million influencer and commercial content campaign promoting travel to Israel. A separate $1 million agreement with Bridges Partners, called Project Esther, funds influencer-based cultural-exchange content between the U.S. and Israel.

Documents related to the Show Faith proposal describe what was billed as "the largest geofencing campaign in U.S. history", digitally mapping thousands of churches and Christian colleges across California, Arizona, Nevada, and Colorado during worship hours to identify and later target attendees with pro-Israel ads. The project aimed to reach an estimated 12 million people, including eight million churchgoers and four million Christian students. The expanded campaigns coincide with a measurable decline in American public support for Israel, including among younger Republicans and evangelical Christians, according to Pew surveys conducted between 2022 and 2025.

Netanyahu has emphasized the strategic importance of social media in what he called Israel's "eighth front" alongside military, economic, and political arenas. In a 2025 meeting with pro-Israel influencers in New York, he called social media "the most important weapon today" and urged further investment in digital campaigns targeting foreign audiences.

==== Media management and covert digital campaigns ====
Following the October 7 attacks, the IDF Spokesperson's Unit expanded its use of covert digital efforts and strict media management to shape both international and domestic narratives. According to a 2024 investigation by Israeli outlet The Hottest Place in Hell, published in collaboration with +972 Magazine, these efforts were not isolated incidents but part of a systematic "organizational culture of deception" and a broader pattern of influence operations. The unit's campaigns division operated a covert initiative branded as "Fact Check", which used WhatsApp, YouTube, and Instagram accounts presented as independent, U.S.-based nonprofit news organizations. On these platforms, the military produced and disseminated dozens of videos advancing official narratives without disclosing their origin, including explicit defenses against war crimes allegations at the International Court of Justice, arguments that Jews cannot be considered colonizers in Palestine due to biblical ties, and claims that Israel's actions in Gaza do not amount to genocide. The military recruited dozens of Israeli and international influencers, such as Noa Tishby and Sarai Givaty, to amplify the messaging to millions of viewers. This operation followed a pattern established by the 2021 #GazaRegrets campaign, first disclosed by Haaretz, which used fake social media accounts to target the Israeli public with airstrike footage to bolster domestic support.

Beyond digital campaigns, the unit used a "carrot-and-stick" approach to manage the "correspondents' cell", a select group of about 16 Israeli reporters with exclusive military access. The investigation described a system where the unit rewarded compliant journalists with exclusive leaks and briefings while "boycotting" or punishing critical reporters by withholding information. Haaretz military correspondent Yaniv Kubovich said the unit's primary goal was often to suppress reporting that exposed failures, ethical issues, or command shortcomings. Soldiers and military correspondents accused the unit of manipulating data to inflate military successes. This strategy included the production of Bearing Witness to the October 7th Massacre, which soldiers involved in the project said was managed like a "social media advertising campaign" designed to maximize global emotional impact through the rapid circulation of graphic material. Critics cited in the investigation argue these practices have turned military correspondents into "mouthpieces" contributing to a significant decline in public trust in official military statements as the Israeli public began to question the disparity between official briefings and the reality of ongoing attacks.

In August 2026, investigations by Politico and The Guardian revealed that the Israeli government spent tens of millions of dollars routed through European media conglomerate Havas Media and New York media firm Piro, Inc. to fund the Hanover Institute for Public Policy, a fake U.S.-based think tank without legal registration, staff, or physical headquarters. Filed under the Foreign Agents Registration Act, the website published 124 reports totaling over 560,000 words in nine days, using neutral, academic-style formatting to frame topics like genocide, war crimes, and human rights abuses in Gaza favorably toward Israel. Designed for generative engine optimization, almost all report titles were structured as common chatbot prompts. The platform also used site configuration tools to teach search engine crawlers how to read its content, alongside specialized software from AI-optimization company Res, to train commercial chatbots like ChatGPT, Perplexity, Claude, and Gemini to cite its material. Analysts at the Quincy Institute noted that the effort targeted both live search outputs and underlying web scraping repositories like Common Crawl. Despite the substantial funding, internal Israeli ministry briefings and public opinion surveys published in 2026 indicated that the campaigns failed to reverse declining support for Israel among the U.S. public.

==== External contracting and financial irregularities ====
After the Ministry of Public Diplomacy closed during the Gaza War, responsibility for Israel's international advocacy shifted to the National Information Directorate. The Directorate rapidly recruited dozens of external consultants, commentators, and influencers, most of whom were reservists or private contractors. Due to a lack of formal government tenders, the Prime Minister's Office used a "conduit" payment system, funneling funds through private production companies to cover advocates' salaries. This arrangement included high-profile figures such as spokesperson Eylon Levy, whose monthly salary of 41,125 shekels was paid via a third party rather than the state treasury.

Beyond standard advocacy, these private contracts funded specific influence operations, including logistics and flights for activists sent to The Hague. These individuals were tasked with countering pro-Palestinian demonstrations during the International Court of Justice hearings regarding South Africa's genocide case against Israel. By late 2024, the state faced lawsuits totaling millions of shekels from unpaid staff and suppliers, some hired indirectly by outside contractors, alongside a police investigation into a former employee suspected of forging signatures to authorize these irregular contracts. The two biggest companies are demanding two million shekels ($650,000). Eylon Levy says he's not part of these lawsuits, but that he was owed money. The Prime Minister's Office acknowledged that there were "irregularities in the contracting practices of the public diplomacy directorate," but they couldn't comment further while litigation was going on. In September 2025 the Israeli government approved an additional 150m shekels ($49m) for Hasbara, which was taken out of funds for higher education.

==== Funding ====
In its 2025 budget, Israel planned to spend $150 million on hasbara, a 20-fold increase from previous years. In the 2026 budget, this funding was nearly quintupled, with about $730 million allocated to public diplomacy campaigns.

== See also ==
- Act.IL
- Jewish Internet Defense Force
- Media coverage of the Arab–Israeli conflict
- Media Watch International
- Weaponization of antisemitism
