= The Historical Geography of the Holy Land =

Historical Geography of the Holy Land by George Adam Smith

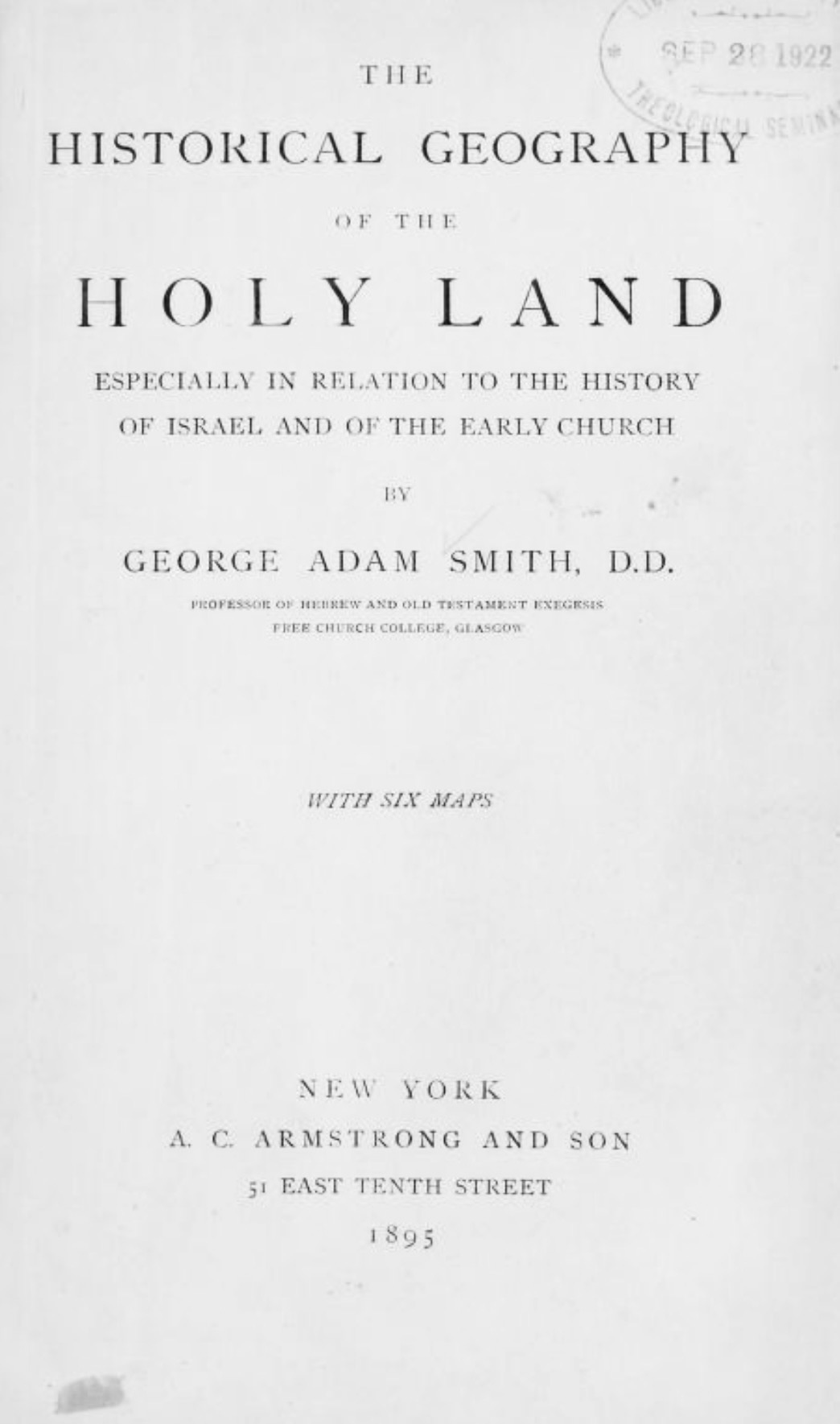
- Author: George Adam Smith
- Language: English
- Genre: Historical geography, Biblical studies
- Publisher: Hodder & Stoughton, A. C. Armstrong and Son
- Publication date: 1894
- Publication place: United Kingdom

Atlas of the Historical Geography of the Holy Land
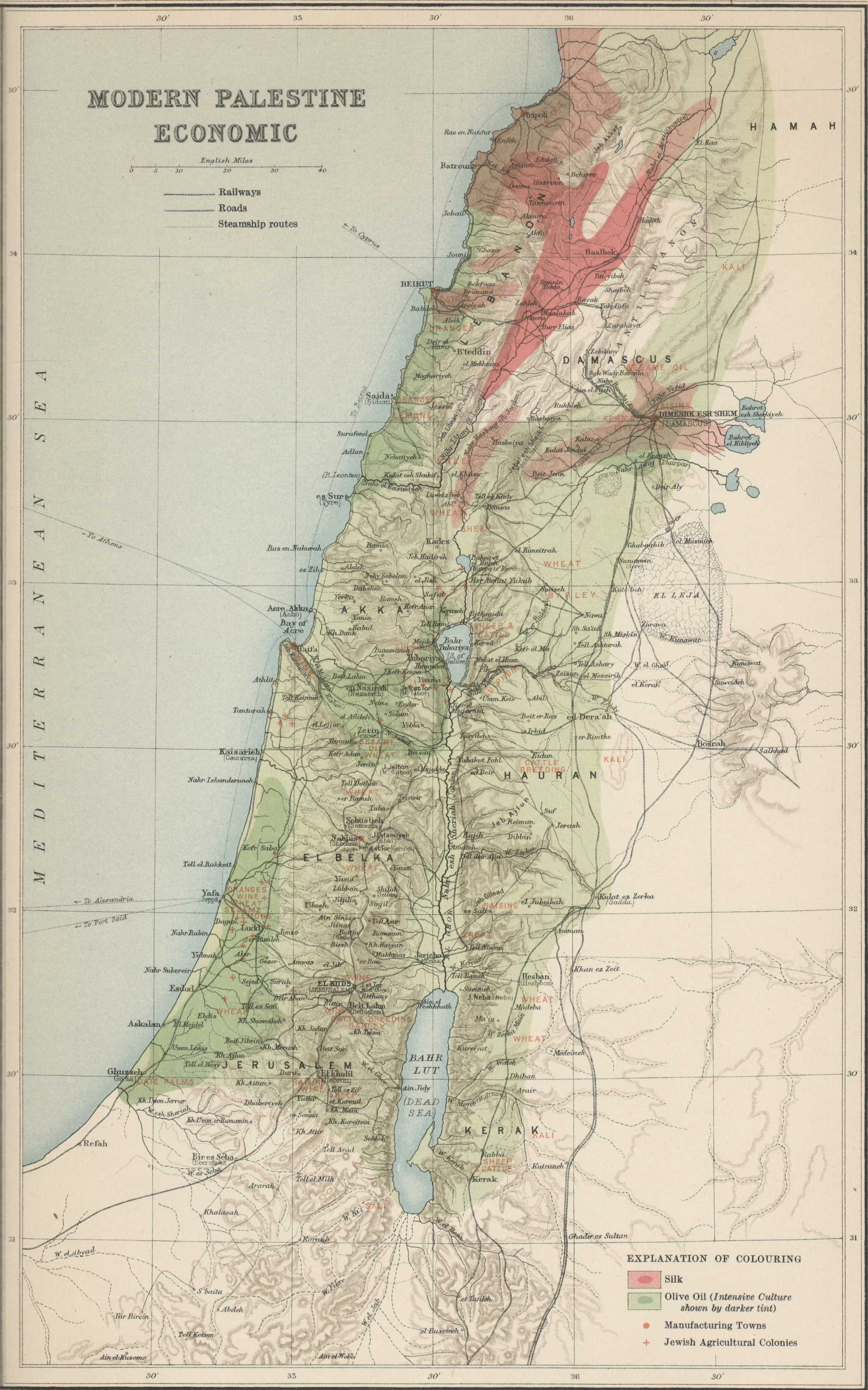
- Author: George Adam Smith (designed and edited)
- Illustrator: John George Bartholomew
- Language: English
- Genre: Historical atlas
- Publisher: Hodder & Stoughton
- Publication date: 1915
- Publication place: United Kingdom

The Historical Geography of the Holy Land is a work of biblical geography and a travelogue of Palestine, and the magnum opus of Scottish theologian George Adam Smith. The book, first published in 1894, sought to explain the history, literature and religion of the Bible through a description of the physical geography of Palestine, combining firsthand observation with biblical criticism and archeological research. The work was widely read, revised repeatedly (with 26 editions), and became the definitive work on the topic, establishing Smith as one of the leading authorities on the geography of the Holy Land.

Smith extended his geographical project with the Atlas of the Historical Geography of the Holy Land (1915), designed and edited by Smith and prepared under the direction of John George Bartholomew at the Edinburgh Geographical Institute. Published just a few years prior to the Paris Peace Conference (1919–1920), the book was used by politicians and diplomats to negotiate the borders of Mandatory Palestine.

In 1983, Biblical Archaeology Review described the work in a review of Bible atlases as: "[s]till one of the best Biblical geographies in print, this work is also one of the earliest... Though the maps are out of date and many of the site identifications are now known to be incorrect, the theological and literary contributions of this work are timeless."

Historical Geography had sold 35,000 copies by 1942, the year of George Adam Smith's death, and remained in print until 1976. It continues to have a significant second-hand readership.

== Background ==
The work looked built on the legacy of the key 19th-century works of biblical geography and travelogues of Palestine, such as Biblical Researches in Palestine (1841), The Land and the Book (1859) and the PEF Survey of Palestine (1881–1889).

George Adam Smith, a Scottish scholar of theology, had travelled in Palestine in 1880 and again in 1891, 1901 and 1904, undertaking systematic observations of its landscape, climate, geology and settlement.

== Scope and structure ==
=== Historical Geography ===
The book is organised into three main sections. The first section, about 20% in size, treats Syria and Palestine as a whole, examining physical form, climate, fertility, scenery and their relationship to biblical history. The second, about 60% of the work, focuses on Palestine west of the Jordan River, while the third, about 20%, addresses Transjordan. Throughout, geography is presented as a shaping force in historical development, prophetic literature and religious expression.

=== Atlas ===
The atlas synthesised nineteenth-century exploration, particularly the PEF Survey of Palestine, and presented historical maps illustrating territorial change from biblical to modern periods. It contained 60 maps and a detailed index.

== Reception and influence ==
The work was well received on publication and became Smith's most influential geographical study, reaching a twenty-sixth edition by 1935. It was used extensively by scholars, clergy and students, and was also consulted beyond academic circles, including during the British military campaign in Palestine in the First World War. It has been criticized as an Orientalist work, producing a "museumified" picture of Palestine.

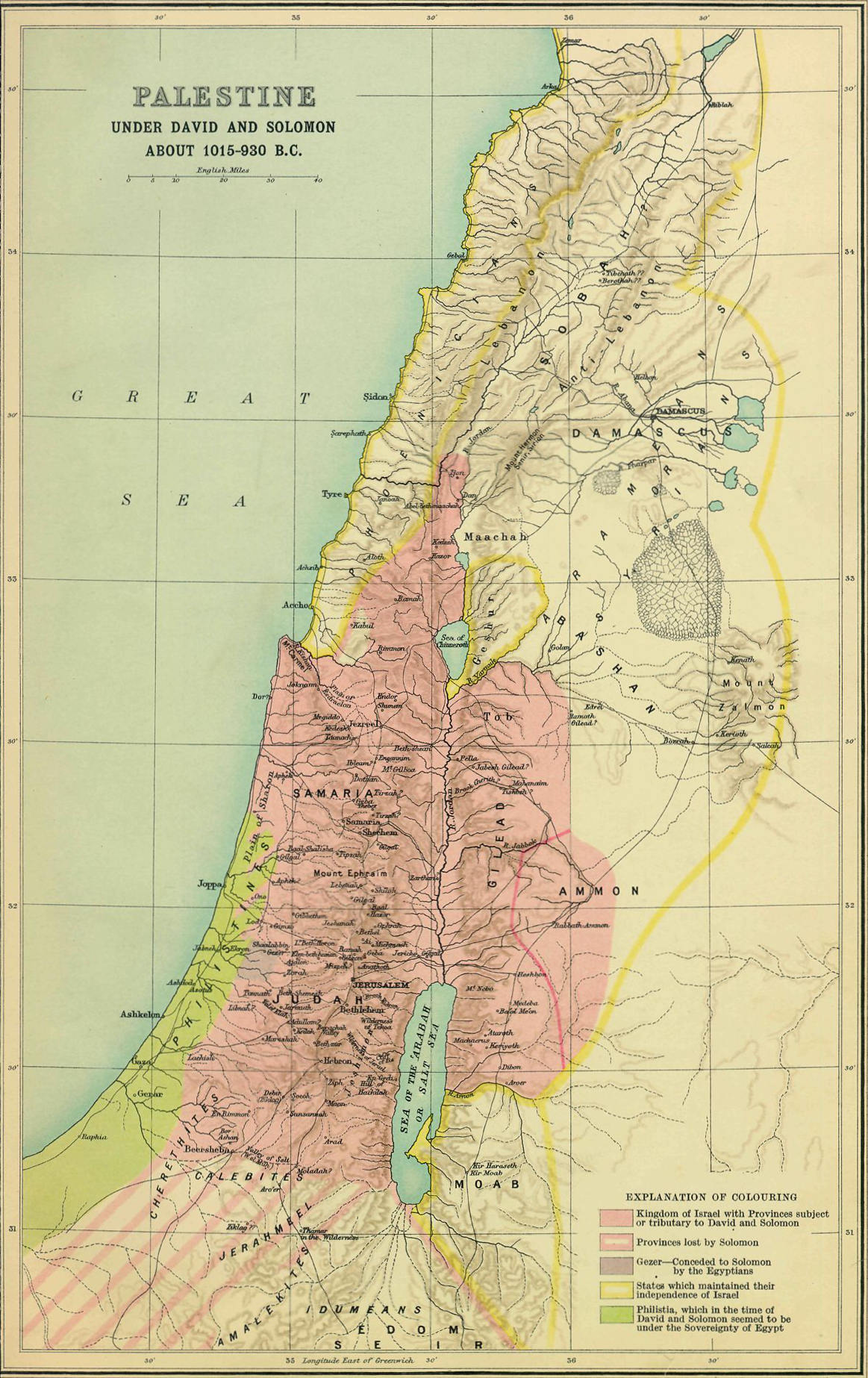
Map number 34: "Palestine under David and Solomon about 1015–930 B.C"

The work was used as a practical field guide by Edmund Allenby during the Sinai and Palestine campaign, and later served as an authoritative reference in British government deliberations over the future boundaries of the Mandate for Palestine.

At the Paris Peace Conference (1919–1920), British prime minister David Lloyd George repeatedly cited Smith's maps, particularly those depicting biblical-era borders from Dan to Beersheba, to argue for a "real Palestine" grounded in ancient historical geography. Smith's atlas and book were circulated among British and French negotiators, and invoked against competing territorial claims from Louis Brandeis, who was working for both President Woodrow Wilson and the World Zionist Organization.

British prime minister David Lloyd George provided a detailed account over six pages in his 1938 work The Truth About The Peace Treaties. A cable had been received from Louis Brandeis:

My associates of the Zionist Organisation of America cable me from Paris that at the Conference on the Turkish Treaty, France now insists upon the terms of the Sykes–Picot Agreement. If this French contention should prevail, it would defeat the full realisation of the promise of a Jewish Home, for the Sykes–Picot Agreement divides the country in complete disregard of historic boundaries and of actual necessity. Rational northern and eastern boundaries are indispensable to a self-sustaining community and to the economic development of the country. On the north, Palestine must include the Litani River watersheds; on the east, it must include the watersheds of Hermon and the Plain of Jaulan and Hauran. If the Balfour Declaration subscribed to by France as well as by the other Allied and Associated Powers is to be made effective, these boundaries must be conceded to Palestine. Anything less would produce a mutilation of the promised Home. The Balfour Declaration was a public promise proclaimed by your Government and subscribed to by the Allied Powers. I venture to suggest that, in assuring a just settlement of Palestine's boundaries, the statesmen of Christian nations should keep this solemn promise to Israel.

This demand was considered to be unreasonable – Smith's map number 34: "Palestine under David and Solomon about 1015–930 B.C" was ultimately accepted as a fair basis for delimiting Palestine's boundaries. Lloyd George wrote in his memoirs:

M. Berthelot, after commenting that the contents of the telegram suggested Judge Brandeis had a much exaggerated sense of his own importance, said that he had carefully studied an authoritative work on Palestine which Mr. Lloyd George had been good enough to lend him. This work clearly showed that the historic boundaries of Palestine had never extended beyond Dan and Beersheba, and he was quite prepared to recommend to his Government that these should be recognised as the correct boundaries... Mr. Lloyd George said that the book he had asked M. Berthelot to read constituted the greatest authority in the English language on the question of Palestine. It showed that while the boundaries had at times stretched slightly beyond Dan and Beersheba, these places had always remained Palestine's historic limits. After consultation with Lord Allenby and other authorities, the British Government had decided to accept these as the boundaries for the future. These boundaries had also been accepted by M. Clemenceau, whose acceptance had since been loyally upheld by the present French Government. Mr. Lloyd George therefore proposed to reply to Judge Brandeis to the effect that the Judge's geography was at fault, and that it might be well for him to study more authoritative and accurate maps than those apparently at his disposal.

=== Netanyahu claim ===
In his 1993 work, A Place Among the Nations, Benjamin Netanyahu claimed that:

Sir George Adam Smith, author of The Historical Geography of the Holy Land, [wrote] in 1891, "Nor is there any indigenous civilization in Palestine that could take the place of the Turkish except that of the Jews who... have given to Palestine anything it ever had of value to the world." Hence, when the world leaders at Versailles weighed the question of competing Jewish and Arab claims, they were justifiably not concerned with any "Palestinian" national claim.

George Adam Smith's grandson, Adam Roberts, examined this claim in 2017 in an article in Haaretz, showing that the attribution was false, tracing the falsely attributed words through Netanyahu's citation of the polemical work Battleground: Fact and Fantasy in Palestine to the Zionist journalist Herbert Sidebotham. Roberts showed that Smith's own writings, particularly The Historical Geography of the Holy Land, had in fact rejected the notion that Palestine could ever properly belong to a single nation, including the Jews, emphasising its character as a land shaped by multiple peoples and tribes.

== Editions ==
=== Historical Geography ===
- Second edition (1895)
- Third edition (1895)
- Fourth edition (1897)
- Seventh edition (1901)
- Ninth edition (1902)
- Twenty sixth edition (1935)

=== Atlas ===
- Smith, George Adam; Bartholomew, John George (1915). Atlas of the Historical Geography of the Holy Land. Hodder & Stoughton.

== Bibliography ==
- Aiken, Edwin James (2020). Scriptural Geography: Portraying the Holy Land. Tauris Historical Geographical Series. Bloomsbury Academic. ISBN 978-1-350-17086-5.
- Butlin, Robin (1988). "George Adam Smith and the historical geography of the Holy Land: contents, contexts and connections". Journal of Historical Geography. 14 (4): 381–404. doi:10.1016/S0305-7488(88)80038-0.
- Kirchhoff, Markus (2005). "Surveying the Land: Western Societies for the Exploration of Palestine, 1865–1920". In Stuchtey, Benedikt (ed.). Science across the European Empires, 1800–1950 (PDF). pp. 149–172.
- Lloyd George, David (1938). The Truth about the Peace Treaties. V. Gollancz. pp. 1176–1181.
