= Palestinian Jews =

Pre-1948 Jewish inhabitants of Palestine

יְהוּדִים פָלַסְטִינִים اليهود الفلسطينيون

Regions with significant populations
- Palestine (Land of Israel)

Languages
- Modern Hebrew; Palestinian Arabic

Religion
- Judaism

Related ethnic groups
- Samaritans and Israeli Jews

Palestinian Jews or Jewish Palestinians (Hebrew: יְהוּדִים פָלַסְטִינִים; Arabic: اليهود الفلسطينيون) are historical designations for the Jews who inhabited Palestine (alternatively the Land of Israel) prior to the establishment of the State of Israel in 1948.

The term reflects the use of "Palestine" as a geographic and administrative labeling under the Ottoman Empire and Mandatory Palestine. At that time, the Jewish community in Palestine was also commonly referred to as the Yishuv, a term used for the Jewish population and settlement in Palestine before the establishment of Israel.

Following the 1948 Arab–Israeli War and the establishment of Israel, the Jewish population was naturalized under Israeli citizenship law, and the Palestinian designation largely receded into historical usage.

== History ==
=== Ottoman era ===
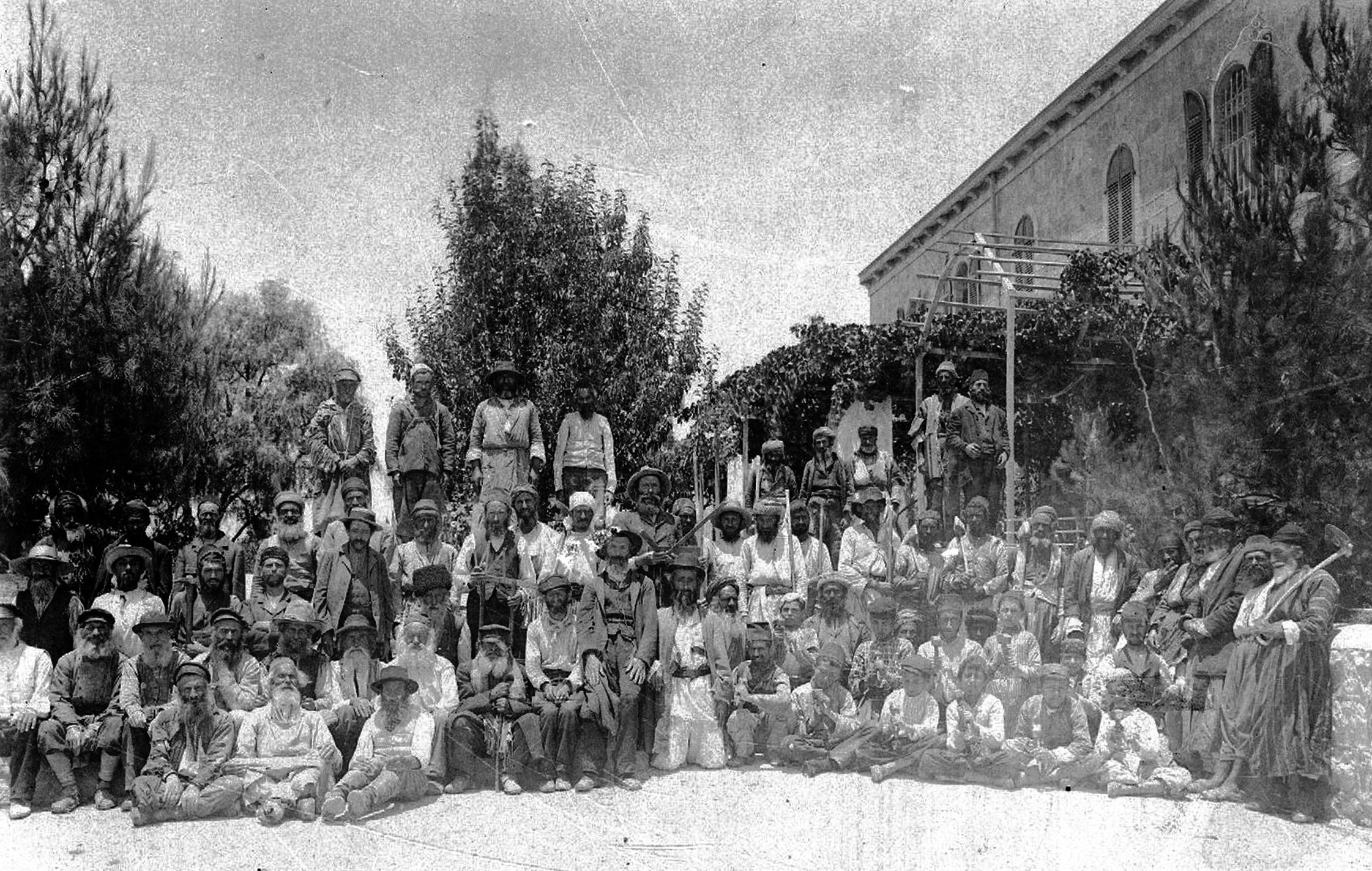
Workers in Kerem Avraham, an agricultural colony outside of Jerusalem

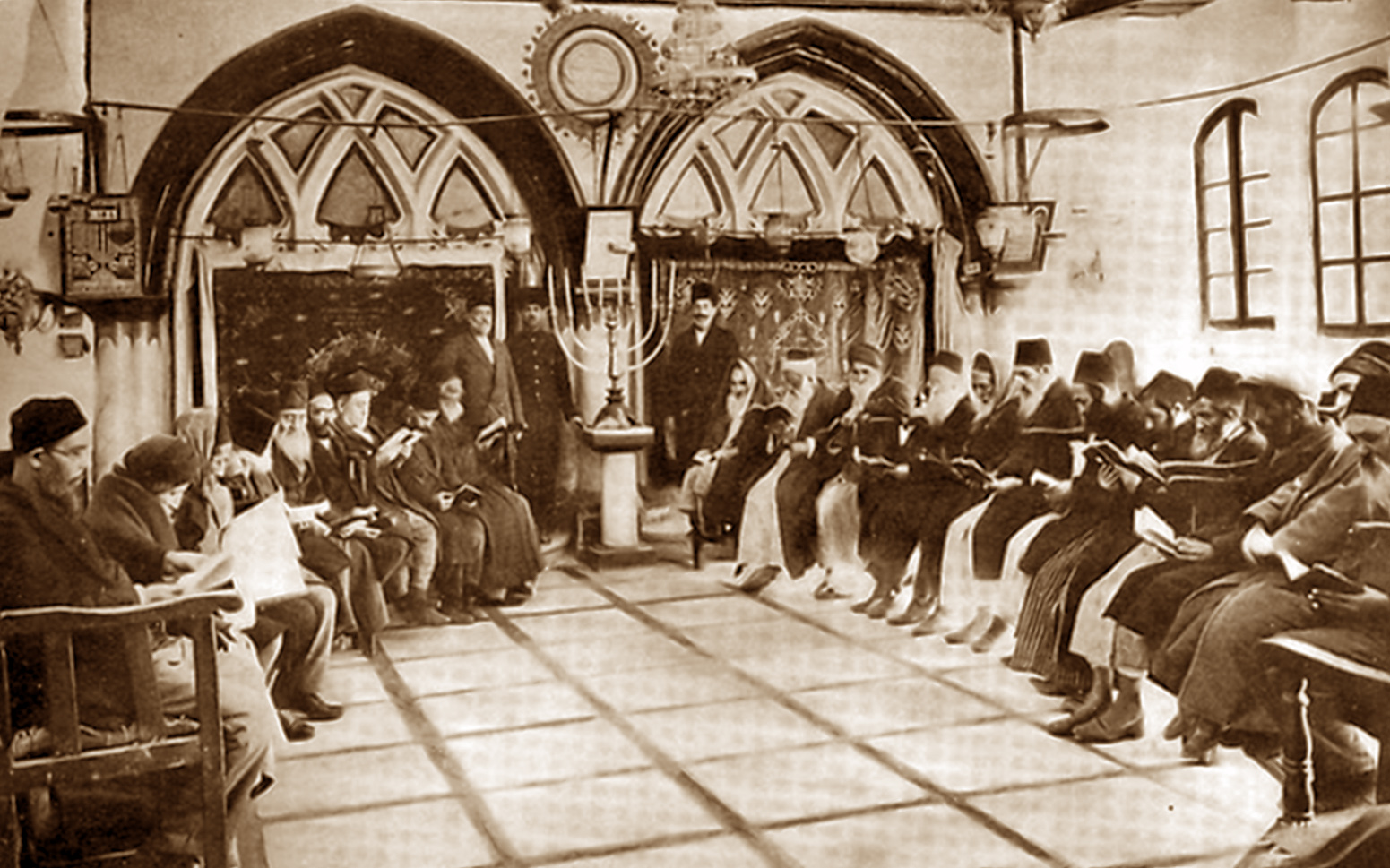
Jews in "Ben Zakai" house of prayer, Jerusalem, 1893

Under Ottoman rule following the 1516 conquest, native Jewish communities lived primarily in the four "holy cities" of Safed, Tiberias, Hebron and Jerusalem. In the mid-16th century, the Jewish population numbered roughly 10,000 (around 5% of the total). By the mid-19th century, Ottoman sources recorded a Jewish population of 5% to 7% out of a total regional population of approximately 600,000.

Unlike neighboring Arab regions where Jewish populations were comparatively homogeneous, the Jewish community in 19th-century Palestine comprised distinct sub-ethnic and linguistic groups. These included indigenous Musta'arabim (Arabic-speaking Jews who predated Ottoman rule), Sephardim (Judeo-Spanish speakers descending from the 1492 Iberian expulsion), Maghrebim from North Africa, and Ashkenazim from Eastern Europe. While Yiddish prevailed among European Ashkenazi immigrants in Jerusalem, Arabic served both as the native tongue for Musta'arabim and Maghrebim, and as the common lingua franca for commerce and daily interactions across mixed cities like Safed and Hebron.

In the late Ottoman period, local Arabic discourse often distinguished long-established native Jews from recent European arrivals. Autobiographies and diaries from the era, such as those of Khalil al-Sakakini and Wasif Jawhariyyeh, refer to native Jews as abnaa al-balad ("sons of the country"), "compatriots", or Yahud awlad Arab ("Jews, sons of Arabs"). When the First Palestinian Congress of February 1919 issued its anti-Zionist manifesto rejecting Zionist immigration, it similarly extended a welcome to Jews "among us who have been Arabicized... they are as we are, and their loyalties are our own."

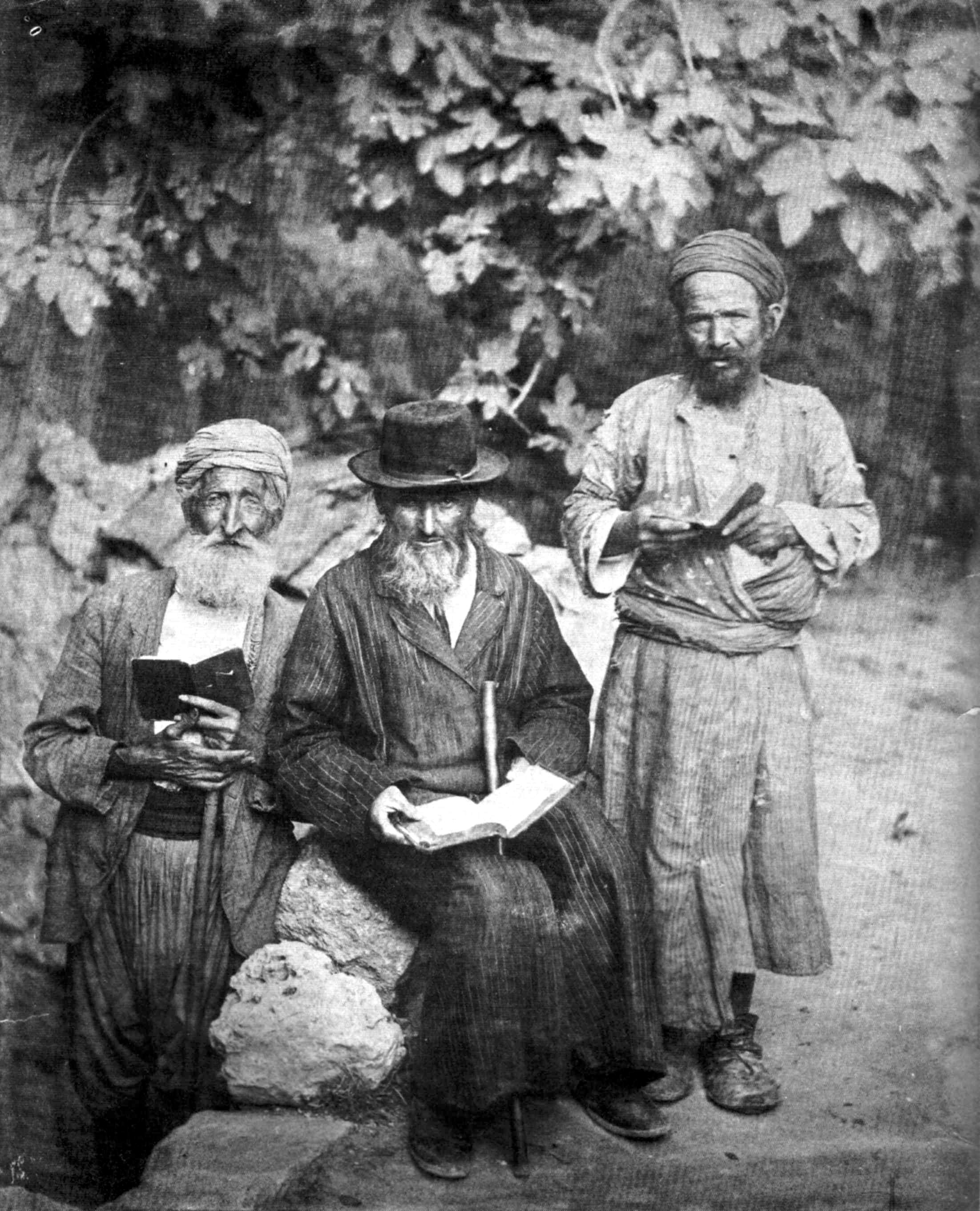
A photo of three elderly Jewish men holding books, made by the American Colony, Jerusalem and published in The Jewish Encyclopedia.

Legally, non-Muslim subjects within the Ottoman Empire were organized under the millet system and historically classified as dhimmi (protected second-class subjects), subjecting them to specific restrictions and taxation. Although the mid-19th-century Tanzimat reforms formally granted equal legal citizenship to non-Muslims, social hierarchies and political friction over immigration persisted into the final decades of Ottoman rule.

Following the 1908 Young Turk Revolution, the concept of a "shared homeland," supporting unity among Ottoman citizens regardless of religious, ethnic, and linguistic and cultural differences, became popular in Ottoman political discourse and was employed by Arabic-speaking Sephardim. Some Palestinian Jews, including Shimon Moyal (1866–1915), Abraham Yahuda (1877–1951), Ḥayyim Ben Qīqī (1887–1935), and Nissim Malul (1892–1959), advocated for Jewish-Arab collaboration in Palestine and called for Ashkenazi immigrants to learn Arabic and assimilate to the local culture.

=== British Mandate era ===
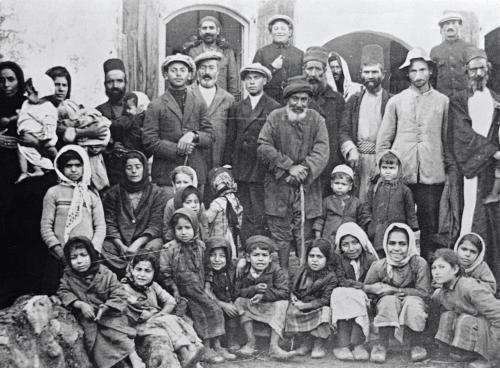
Jews of Peki'in, c. 1930

A 1920 open letter in the Arabic newspaper al-Quds ash-Sharīf (Note: "إلى اليهود العرب والصهيونيين [To the Arab Jews and the Zionists]" al-Quds ash-Sharīf. 8 July 1920. https://www.nli.org.il/en/newspapers/?a=d&d=qudsalsharif19200708-01), translated and printed in Do'ar HaYom, differentiated between local Jews and foreign (Ashkenazi) Zionist immigrants, addressing them as distinct groups and calling on the former to live together in peace as they had for centuries and questioning whether peace was possible with the latter citing differences in language and tradition.

By the late Ottoman period on the eve of World War I, local Arab populations, increasingly organizing around a distinct Palestinian national consciousness, became alienated from local Arabic-speaking Jews over their expanding support for the Zionist movement and Jewish settlement in Palestine.

Local Sephardic publications like HaHerut promoted a pro-Zionist and pro-Ottoman stance. While organizations like HaMagen were established by Arabic-speaking Jews to counter anti-Zionism in the Arab press, translate articles, and foster mutual understanding, rising nationalist sentiment made reconciliation increasingly difficult.

During the early British Mandate, Arab political figures and newspapers continued appeals to non-Ashkenazi Jews. In 1920, the newspaper al-Quds al-Sharif called on local Jews to reject political Zionism and recent European immigration, pointing to their shared local history. Although a 1921 delegation representing the Palestine Arab Congress claimed to British officials in London that native Sephardim opposed Zionism, these Arab political overtures were largely rejected by the local Sephardic leadership.

The 1929 Anti-Jewish riots marked a final breakdown in relations. The violence drove previously non-Zionist or indifferent native, Eastern, and Maghrebi Jewish communities to align fully with the broader Zionist Yishuv for physical security and political protection.

=== 1948 transition to State of Israel ===
As the British Mandate drew to a close and the State of Israel was established, archival documents released by the Israel State Archives show that Jewish officials debated what the new country would be called in Arabic: Palestine (Filastin), Zion (Sahyoun), or Israel (Isra’il). Officials anticipated the concurrent creation of an Arab state under the UN partition plan and recognized that the Jewish state would encompass a large Arab minority. The name Palestine was ultimately rejected to avoid confusion with the projected Arab state, leading officials to select Israel.

== Uses and identity ==
=== References to Jews in Europe as Palestinians ===
European Jews were commonly considered an "Oriental" people in many of their host countries. The 18th-century Prussian philosopher Immanuel Kant in an anti-Jewish polemic referred to European Jews as "Palestinians living among us." The British Mandate referred to Arab Palestinians and Jewish settlers from Europe alike as "Palestinians," consistent with an Orientalist view of all Jews as Eastern people.

=== PLO Charter definition ===
The Palestinian National Charter, as amended by the PLO's Palestinian National Council in July 1968, defined Palestinians as "those Arab nationals who, until 1947, normally resided in Palestine regardless of whether they were evicted from it or stayed there. Anyone born, after that date, of a Palestinian father—whether in Palestine or outside it—is also a Palestinian. The Jews who had normally resided in Palestine until the beginning of the Zionist invasion will be considered Palestinians."

== See also ==
- History of the Jews and Judaism in the Land of Israel
  - History of the Jews in Gaza
  - Ancient synagogues in Palestine
  - Palestinian Gaonate
  - Palestinian minhag
  - Palestinian rabbis
  - Palestinian Talmud
  - Palestinian vocalization of Hebrew
  - Jewish Palestinian Aramaic
- Samaritans, descended from the Israelites alongside the Jews
- Mizrahi Jews, Israeli and pre-state Hebrew term for Middle Eastern and North African Jews
  - Arab Jews
- Sabra (person), modern term for a Jew born in Israel
