= HaMagen (society) =

Society of Arabic speaking Palestinian Jews in the Ottoman Empire

HaMagen (Hebrew: המגן, lit. The Shield), was a society of Arabic speaking Palestinian Jews in the Ottoman Empire created in 1913 to promote Zionism and counter anti-Zionism and Anti-semitism in the Arab press. It was founded by Nissim Malul, Shimon Moyal, Esther Moyal, and Avraham Elmalih, as well as others from Jaffa’s Sephardic community.

== Views ==
Avraham Elmaliah described the organisation's reason for being founded as ,

especially us [the society’s founders], who know the language of the country and who day in and day out read this poisonous press, who know the characteristics of the Arab people, with whom we live in close proximity to, are starting to feel [the situation] getting worse… realizing that we cannot sit silently while such great danger threatens the entire Yishuv.

HaMagen proposed that Jews to take a more active role in politics to create a new generation of Jewish politicians to challenge the Palestinian Arabs in Ottoman politics, both in Istanbul and Jerusalem. The group also formed a legal team to challenge the Palestinian opposition in the courts and with help of the Ottoman Empire’s Chief Rabbi Haim Nahum, worked to suspend antisemitic Arab press. However they were challenged by the rise of articles in the Arab press that were rapidly changing from local patriotism to Arab nationalism.

The society combined Ottomanism with Zionism to portray the image of loyal Ottomans and attempted to create a greater understanding among Jews and Arabs, translating articles in the Arabic press so that new arrivals could be exposed to Arabs and their culture.
