= From Dan to Beersheba =

Biblical phrase defining a geography

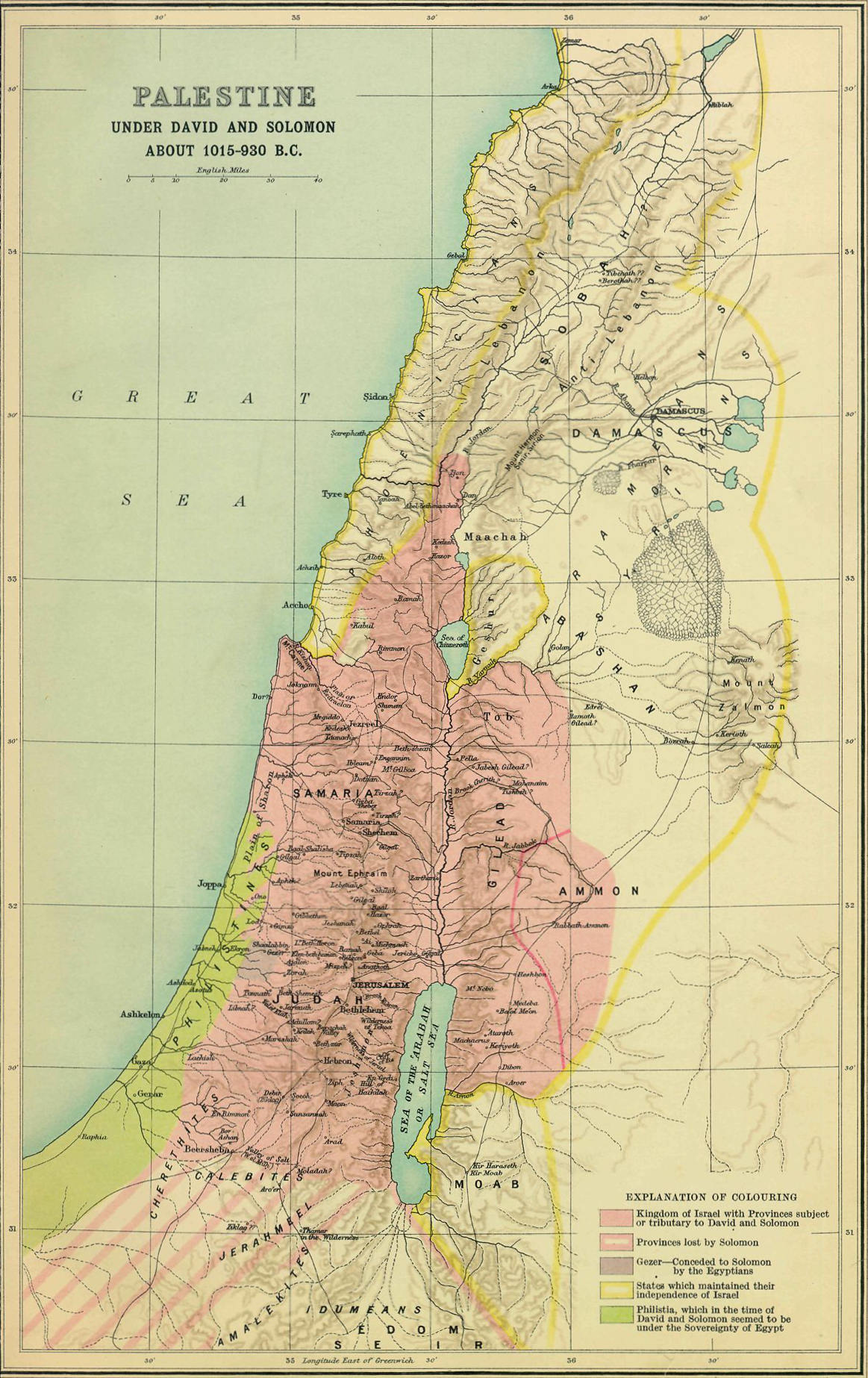
This map from The Historical Geography of the Holy Land, showing Dan to Beersheba in the context of "Palestine under David and Solomon about 1015 - 930 B.C" was used at the Paris Peace Conference (1919–1920) during negotiations over the boundaries of the Mandate for Palestine.

From Dan to Beersheba is a biblical phrase used nine times in the Hebrew Bible to refer to the settled areas of the Tribes of Israel between Dan in the North and Beersheba in the South. The term contributed to the position that was used by British politicians during negotiation of the British Mandate for Palestine following World War I.

== Biblical verses ==
It is found in the biblical verses:

1. Judges 20:1 during the Battle of Gibeah at the end of the Book of Judges

"Then all Israel from Dan to Beersheba and from the land of Gilead came together as one and assembled before the LORD in Mizpah."

2. 1 Samuel 3:20 during the "Calling of Samuel"

"And all Israel from Dan to Beersheba recognized that Samuel was attested as a prophet of the LORD."

3. 2 Samuel 3:10 during the war between Ish-bosheth and his brother-in-law David following the death of Saul

"...and transfer the kingdom from the house of Saul and establish David's throne over Israel and Judah from Dan to Beersheba."

4. 2 Samuel 17:11 during the rebellion of David's son Absalom

"So I advise you: Let all Israel, from Dan to Beersheba—as numerous as the sand on the seashore—be gathered to you, with you yourself leading them into battle."

5. / 6. 2 Samuel 24:2 / 1 Chronicles 21:2 on David's census of Israel and Judah

"So the king said to Joab and the army commanders with him, "Go throughout the tribes of Israel from Dan to Beersheba and enroll the fighting men, so that I may know how many there are".
"So David said to Joab and the commanders of the troops, "Go and count the Israelites from Beersheba to Dan. Then report back to me so that I may know how many there are."

7. 2 Samuel 24:15 following David's census of Israel and Judah

"So the LORD sent a plague on Israel from that morning until the end of the time designated, and seventy thousand of the people from Dan to Beersheba died."

8. 1 Kings 4:25 following Solomon's ascent to the throne

"During Solomon's lifetime Judah and Israel, from Dan to Beersheba, lived in safety, everyone under their own vine and under their own fig tree."

9. 2 Chronicles 30:5 during Hezekiah's passover

"They decided to send a proclamation throughout Israel, from Beersheba to Dan, calling the people to come to Jerusalem and celebrate the Passover to the LORD, the God of Israel. It had not been celebrated in large numbers according to what was written."

== Modern history ==
During the peace negotiations following World War I, "from Dan to Beersheba" – as defined by George Adam Smith's The Historical Geography of the Holy Land – contributed to the British proposal for the area of Palestine to be carved out of the Ottoman Empire as a League of Nations mandate. On 13 September 1919, a memorandum was handed from Lloyd George to Georges Clemenceau which stated that British Palestine would be "defined in accordance with its ancient boundaries of Dan to Beersheba".

== See also ==
- Borders of Israel
