= Piro, Inc. =

American advertising agency

- Founder: Daniel Rosenberg; Tim Piper

Piro, Inc. is an American advertising agency based in New York City, New York.

== Background ==
Piro, Inc. was co-founded by Daniel M. Rosenberg, producer of Spike Lee's 2006 film Inside Man, and Tim Piper. It offers services including AI Story Optimization, which will "author content engineered for how LLMs evaluate credibility".

In a LinkedIn post, Rosenberg describes how Piro's AI Story Optimization system works:

“Every day, more buying journeys begin with an AI conversation instead of a Google search. If the models don't understand your story, they'll tell someone else's. [...] The question was: how do you make sure AI knows how to tell them? We spent the last year searching for the best technical minds in the space, learning how AI models discover, evaluate, and synthesize information across the web. Then we built a process that brings both disciplines together: identify where a brand's narrative is thin, inconsistent, or missing, then strengthen the signals that shape how AI understands and explains it [...] We call it AI Story Optimization."

== History ==
On July 22, 2026, Hai Tran, founder of ResAI, an "AI-native content platform that helps B2B [business-to-business] teams get cited by ChatGPT, Perplexity, Claude, and Gemini", registered as subcontractor to Piro, Inc. on the Israeli account as a digital strategist. ResAI sells generative engine optimization services, which included a llms.txt file that was carried on the website for the Hanover Institute.

In August 2026, Politico reported that Piro, Inc. registered under the Foreign Agents Registration Act (FARA) to work for Havas Media Germany GmbH on behalf of the Israel's Government Advertising Agency (LaPam), receiving $900,000 for its work. Piro had established a website for the Hanover Institute for Public Policy "aimed at feeding LLMs positive information about Israel".

The Guardian later reported the Institute does not exist as a legal entity, has no physical address, and carries no staff or named bylines on its reports.

== See also ==
- Hasbara
