= Hanover Institute for Public Policy =

Pro-Israel propaganda website

- Creator: Piro, Inc. (on behalf of the Israel Government Advertising Agency)
- Website: hanoverinstitute.com
- Commercial: No
- Launched: 2026

The Hanover Institute for Public Policy is a website created on behalf of the Israel Government Advertising Agency that publishes AI-generated pro-Israel content to influence output by search engines and chatbots.

== History ==
The website was set up in 2026 by New York-based advertising company Piro, Inc., which is registered to work for Havas Media Germany GmbH on behalf of the Israel Government Advertising Agency. Piro, Inc is owned by co-founders Daniel Rosenberg and Timothy Piper.

The website publishes AI-generated reports concerning Israel and Palestine that are geared toward influencing the output of large language models. In August 2026, Politico reported that Foreign Agents Registration Act filings showed that over a dozen articles on Hanover's website were part of a $100,000 Israeli government campaign focused on "the creation and dissemination of factual, source-supported informational materials intended to educate the U.S. public regarding Israel and related issues through publicly distributed content." In tests of Perplexity and ChatGPT run by Politico, the chatbots cited the Hanover Institute's material, specifically referring to its reports on Gaza, anti-Zionism and antisemitism.

== Reaction ==
The Quincy Institute for Responsible Statecraft characterized Hanover as a "fake think tank", writing that the website's reports "appear to be part of an Israeli effort to influence chatbots." 404 Media characterized Hanover as a "synthetic Israel-funded think tank." In August 2026, The Spamhaus Project put the Hanover website URL on its Domain Blocklist.

An investigation by 404 Media published on August 25, 2026 wrote that several Hanover reports were found to be written solely with artificial intelligence, adding that "There’s evidence that Hanover’s articles are not just written by LLMs, but are also written for LLMs."

The Guardian later reported Hanover Institute does not exist as a legal entity, has no physical address, and carries no staff or named bylines on its reports.

In an Al Jazeera opinion piece, Said Arikat wrote, "What makes the case extraordinary is not simply that an Israeli government-funded operation sought to influence public opinion. Governments have always done that. What is different is the apparent attempt to influence the machines increasingly shaping public opinion."

== See also ==
- State-sponsored Internet propaganda
- Foreign information manipulation and interference
- Disinformation attack
- Information laundering
- Hasbara
