= Al Hasnaa =

Women's magazine in Lebanon

- Editor: Alawia Sobh
- Former editors: Alia Al Solh
- Categories: Women's magazine
- Founder: Georges Nicholas Baz
- Founded: 1909
- Country: Lebanon
- Based in: Beirut
- Language: Arabic language
- Website: Al Hasnaa

Al Hasnaa (Arabic: Belle) is an Arabic language women's magazine based in Beirut, Lebanon. The magazine has been in circulation since 1909.

== History and profile ==
Al Hasnaa was launched by Georges Nicholas Baz in 1909. Baz was also the founding editor-in-chief of the magazine which was based in Beirut. The constitutional reforms in the Ottoman Empire in 1908 made it possible to establish the magazine providing a flexible atmosphere for the publications.

One of the early contributors was Esther Azhari Moyal, a Lebanese Jewish journalist, feminist, and translator. In 1968 Alia Al Solh, a daughter of Riad Al Solh, was appointed editor-in-chief of the magazine. Alawia Sobh served as the editor-in-chief of the magazine who was appointed to the post in 1986.
