= Israel Government Advertising Agency =

Government advertising agency of Israel

- לשכת הפרסום הממשלתית; Lishkat HaPirsum HaMemshaltit
- Current logo (Note: In 2022, a new logo featuring the Hebrew acronym לפ״מ was adopted, stylizing the letters ל־פ־מ in a modern, sans-serif design.)

Agency overview
- Jurisdiction: Government of Israel
- Headquarters: 5 Kiryat Mada Street; Jerusalem (formerly Tel Aviv)
- Employees: ~50
- Parent department: Prime Minister's Office
- Website: www.lapam.gov.il?lang=en

The Israel Government Advertising Agency (IGAA; Hebrew: לשכת הפרסום הממשלתית, romanized: Lishkat HaPirsum HaMemshaltit, lit. 'Government advertising bureau'), commonly known by its Hebrew-language acronym Lapam (LPM; לפ״מ), is the state-run bureau responsible for executing public communications and advertising on behalf of the Cabinet of Israel.

== History ==
The agency was originally part of the Ministry of Culture and Sport and later operated under the Ministry of Communications before coming under the purview of the Prime Minister's Office.

In July 2016, the government transferred oversight of the agency from the Prime Minister's Office to the Ministry of Culture and Sport, under Minister Miri Regev. The cabinet decision gave Regev the authority to appoint Lapam's director, marking a significant shift in political control over government advertising. At the time, Lapam managed an annual advertising budget of ₪133 million – approximately US$35,000,000 (equivalent to $46,952,995 in 2025) – a 13% increase from the previous year, placing it among the top ten advertisers in Israel.

== Mandates and structure ==
This logo is a graphic depiction of the Hebrew letter פ (Pe), the first letter of the Hebrew word for "advertisement" – "פרסומת". Produced by the Israel Government Advertising Agency (Lapam) in 2002. It was used as a visual cue to mark the beginning and end of commercial breaks on Israeli Channel 2. The logo remained in use through 2017 and appeared on channels regulated by the Second Authority for Television and Radio.

Lapam develops and manages advertising campaigns for government ministries, the military, law enforcement, public universities, state-owned corporations, museums, and other public sector entities. Its responsibilities span campaign strategy, market research, creative development, media planning, production, and ad placement—both in Israel and abroad, including campaigns for the Ministry of Foreign Affairs and the Ministry of Aliyah and Integration (see also Aliyah).

Lapam is structured into multiple operational units, including research, creative, budgeting, film production, digital design, and ongoing campaign management. It is not funded through a central state budget, but rather operates on payments from the agencies it serves. Historically based in Tel Aviv's Shalom Tower, the agency moved to Jerusalem in 2023 — a relocation that prompted a wave of staff resignations.

Between 2015 and 2021, Lapam shifted significantly from print to digital advertising: spending on internet platforms rose from 21% to 31% of the agency's media budget, while newspaper ad spending fell from 22% to 12%. Lapam also conducts mandatory government notices and public health campaigns, such as those during the COVID-19 pandemic, which led to a temporary increase in television ad expenditures.

Although not named directly, the Government Advertising Bureau (Lapam) operates within the advertising ecosystem described in a 2024 report by the Knesset Research and Information Center, which analyzes advertising market trends and the role of government expenditures in the viability of media outlets in Israel.

The shift in ministerial control in 2016 was significant given Lapam's function as one of Israel's top advertising spenders, often outpacing private-sector firms.

== Leadership ==
As of May 2025, Gadi Margalit (Hebrew: גדי מרגלית) serves as head of the agency, following his appointment after leading the Ministry of Public Diplomacy. He succeeded Gali Sembira, who was dismissed in August 2023 by Minister Galit Distel-Atbaryan after only four months in the role. Hebrew media reported that Sembira's dismissal followed internal Likud criticism labeling her a "leftist" — in part for publicly defending the independence of the judiciary amidst protests against the 2023 Israeli judicial reform. Her departure left only one woman heading any of Israel's 33 ministries — a fact that drew concern amid what commentators described as a broader rollback of female leadership. A 2023 Haaretz editorial framed the trend as part of a deliberate sidelining of women in government, invoking the phrase "בנות מלך החוצה" ("Daughters of the King, Out") — a reversal of the biblical ideal of modest seclusion used satirically to critique the exclusion of women from power.

Margalit had previously served as Lapam's director until 2016, when he stepped down and was later appointed municipal CEO of Haifa. During his tenure, he was praised for creative reforms but also faced criticism over alleged lack of competitive bidding in agency procurement.

== Partnerships and campaigns ==
In 2018, Lapam awarded a digital advertising contract to Adcore Inc. – a publicly listed Israeli marketing technology company, traded on the Toronto Stock Exchange (TSX) – to support a government program aimed at increasing inbound tourism to Israel. The contract was extended in August 2023 for an additional ten months, with an estimated value of up to CAD $20 million (approximately USD $14.8 million as of August 2023) in advertising spending. According to Adcore's public announcement, the campaign contributed to a 25% increase in tourist arrivals prior to the COVID-19 pandemic and continued to target global audiences as borders reopened in 2023.

Lapam has also used digital advertising platforms to disseminate public messaging, including paid content and native advertising formats that appear alongside editorial content on major news websites. These types of campaigns are designed to blend marketing with informational outreach and are commonly used in public diplomacy and tourism promotion strategies.

=== Immigration-related campaigns ===
In 2010, Lapam conducted a campaign on behalf of the Ministry of the Interior warning that the employment of undocumented foreign workers harmed the Israeli economy and constituted a criminal offense. According to political scientist Ami Pedahzur (Hebrew: עמי פדהצור), the campaign's economic rationale masked deeper demographic concerns, particularly fears that African asylum seekers would undermine the Jewish character of the state (Note: There is no direct article link for the phrase, "Jewish character of the state," but see: Haifa Declaration, Zionism, Basic Laws of Israel, and especially the 2018 Basic Law: Israel as the Nation-State of the Jewish People.) (Note: Eli Yishai (אלי ישי), leader of the Shas party, was Israel's Minister of the Interior from March 2009 to March 2013, during Benjamin Netanyahu's Second Government.)

Israel's immigration policy is shaped in large part by the Law of Return, which grants preferential status to Jewish immigrants. Immigration from African or Middle Eastern countries has sometimes been described as a demographic concern in political discourse and media coverage.

== Gaza-related campaigns ==
Shortly after Israel's operations in Gaza began accumulating backlash, the agency began airing ads on YouTube, X and other platforms, in a move that some people consider to be propaganda and misinformation.

== Media and scholarly coverage ==
- Yaron, Lee [in Hebrew] (September 14, 2017). "Israel Government Advertising Agency Against Sign Language Accessibility: 'Hearing Public Will Be Harmed; Visual Overload Will Result'" [לשכת הפרסום הממשלתית נגד הנגשה לשפת הסימנים: ציבור השומעים ייפגע, ייווצר עומס ויזואלי]. Haaretz (weekly) (in Hebrew). Tel Aviv. OCLC 434344719, 51249826, 1241106546.
In recordings obtained by Haaretz, the legal advisor of the agency explained his opposition to a proposed law that would require accessibility of television broadcasts, stating that the translation would harm the effectiveness of the advertisement and delay its airing.
- Gesser-Edelsburg, Anat; Hijazi, Rana; Cohen, Ricky (April 12, 2022). "It Takes Two to Tango: How the COVID-19 Vaccination Campaign in Israel Was Framed by the Health Ministry vs. The Television News". Frontiers in Public Health. 10 887579. Lausanne: Frontiers Media. doi:10.3389/fpubh.2022.887579. PMC 9039239. ISSN 2296-2565 (publication); OCLC 9489537802, 9485060215, 9635839563 (article).
  The authors argue that Lapam's campaigns contributed to a lack of transparency, suppression of dissenting voices, and reinforcement of the government's narrative—raising concerns about democratic oversight and public trust.
- Frenkel, Sheera [at Wikidata] (June 5, 2024). "Israel Secretly Targets U.S. Lawmakers With Influence Campaign on Gaza War". The New York Times. ISSN 0362-4331 (print), ISSN 1553-8095 (online ed.).
1. Blog ed.: "Israel Secretly Targets U.S. Lawmakers With Influence Campaign on Gaza War". Archived from the original on April 4, 2025. ProQuest 3064471189 (U.S. Newsstream database).
2. Print ed.: "Israel Secretly Targets U.S. Lawmakers With Influence Campaign on Gaza War" (Late ed.). p. 1 (section A). ProQuest 3065014907 (U.S. Newsstream database).
- TRT World (October 25, 2023). "Targeted Ads: Millions Spent on Israel's Bid for Western Influence – Amid the Barrage of Airstrikes Killing Palestinians, Israeli Authorities Are Pushing to Shape Public Discourse on the Israel-Gaza Escalations". Archived from the original on December 1, 2023.
The Israeli government has spent an estimated $7.1 million on digital ad campaigns to shape Western public opinion amid the Gaza conflict, according to journalist Sophia Smith Galer. Using data from Semrush, she found that YouTube, X (formerly Twitter), and platforms like Facebook, and Duolingo were targeted, with most ads aimed at France, Germany, and the United Kingdom. Many were graphic, emotional, and allegedly violated ad guidelines; some were later removed by Google. The effort reflects a coordinated attempt by Israel's Foreign Ministry to influence discourse through paid media across Europe and the U.S.
- Bowler, Derek; Flannery, Maria (May 19, 2025). "Israeli Government Agency Paid for Adverts Targeting Eurovision Song Contest Public Vote". Eurovision News – "Spotlight". Geneva: European Broadcasting Union. Archived from the original on May 20, 2025.
See:
1. Eurovision Song Contest 2025 § Controversies on Israeli participation
2. Israel in the Eurovision Song Contest 2025.
3. Controversies of the Eurovision Song Contest § Israeli participation.

== See also ==
- Public diplomacy of Israel

- Hasbara

- Government Press Office (Israel)
- Ministry of Diaspora Affairs and Combating Antisemitism

== Bibliography ==
=== References ===
==== Primary ====
- Adcore Announcements (August 8, 2023). "Adcore Announces Israel Government Advertising Agency Contract Extension" (company press release).

==== Secondary ====
- Binyamin, Moshe (July 31, 2016). "Millions to Regev: By Cabinet Decision, Lapam Will Be Managed Under the Ministry of Culture and Sport" [המיליונים אצל רגב: בהחלטת ממשלה - לפמ תנוהל תחת משרד התרבות והספורט]. ICE – Information, Communication, Economic (in Hebrew). Archived from the original on March 3, 2018.
- Editorial (unsigned) (May 1, 2023). "Daughters of the King, Out" [בנות מלך החוצה]. Haaretz. Tel Aviv. Archived from the original on May 13, 2023.
The headline "בנות מלך החוצה" ("Daughters of the King, Out") is a reductio ad absurdum inversion of the biblical phrase "כל כבודה בת מלך פנימה" ("All the glory of a king's daughter is within," Psalm 45:13), a verse traditionally cited in ultra-Orthodox Jewish contexts to justify modesty and seclusion of women. The editorial uses this phrase satirically to criticize the exclusion of women from public leadership roles in the current Israeli government.
- Exchange Rate. "Canadian Dollar to US Dollar Spot Exchange Rates for 2023". ExchangeRates.org.uk. Archived from the original on April 7, 2024.
- Keller-Lynn, Carrie (August 29, 2023). "After Latest Sacking, Only 1 of 33 Ministries Left With a Woman as Director General". The Times of Israel.
- TheMarker (in Hebrew). Tel Aviv OCLC 1029938116, 985866247, 243460516.
1. Koren-Diner, Roni (January 27, 2002). "New Commercial Break Logo to Replace the Longtime [Hebrew] 'פ' Used on Both Commercial Channels" [לוגו חדש לזמן הפרסומות יחליף את ה"פ" הוותיק בשני הערוצים המסחריים] (in Hebrew).
  The new advertising logo was produced by the Government Advertising Bureau for the Second Authority for Television and Radio. The logo will appear for now only on the new channel; on Channel 2, the old logo will be replaced only in about two months, with the launch of the channel's branding campaign.
2. Tucker, Nati [in Hebrew] (April 12, 2016). "The CEO of the Government Advertising Bureau Is Retiring – And Marking the Next Job." "Margalit Has Held the Position Since November 2011, and Is Now Expected To Be Appointed CEO of the Haifa Municipality" [מנכ"ל לשכת הפרסום הממשלתית פורש - ומסמן את הג'וב הבא]. Archived from the original on August 11, 2024.
3. Tucker, Nati [in Hebrew]; Zrahia, Zvi (July 31, 2016). "No Debate? Without Prior Discussion: Miri Regev Took Control of All Government Advertising Worth 300 Million Shekels" [לא לדאוגוסט? ללא דיון מוקדם: מירי רגב קיבלה שליטה על כל הפרסום הממשלתי ב-300 מיליון שקל] (in Hebrew).
  The government decided to transfer the operations of the Israel Government Advertising Agency (Lapam) to the authority of the Ministry of Culture and Sports, even though there is no clear connection between the ministry's activities and those of the agency.
4. Tucker, Nati [in Hebrew] (October 1, 2023). "Prime Minister's Office Blocks Hiring at Lapam. What Are They Planning?" [במשרד ראש הממשלה חוסמים גיוס עובדים בלשכת הפרסום הממשלתית. מה הם מתכננים?] (in Hebrew).
  More than 45 out of 60 employees at the Government Advertising Agency (LAPAM) announced their resignation last week due to the agency's relocation to Jerusalem. Per the directive of the Prime Minister's Office, no tenders were issued for the positions, even though the resignations were anticipated. Control over LAPAM could grant the government access to one of the key revenue streams of media organizations.
5. Gueta, Yasmin; Tucker, Nati [in Hebrew] (June 3, 2024). "80% of Lapam Employees Have Resigned — No One Left to Run Public Information in Emergencies" [80% מעובדי לפ"מ פרשו — ואין מי שמבצע הסברה בשעת חירום] (in Hebrew).
  The Government Advertising Agency has been depleted of staff in recent weeks following the implementation of a voluntary retirement plan. The Prime Minister's Office has made no effort to find replacements — leaving government ministries without access to routine advertising services. The remaining employees fear this may be part of a political takeover attempt.
- Pedahzur, Ami (2012). The Triumph of Israel's Radical Right. New York: Oxford University Press. p. 207 – via Internet Archive (limited preview). LCCN 2012-6847; ISBN 978-0-1997-4470-1.
- Rotenberg, Bat-Chen (July 14, 2024). "Analysis of the Impact of Changes in Advertising Expenditure on Media Outlets" (PDF). Approved by Ami Zadik. The Knesset – Research & Information Center.
- Steinberg, Jessica (March 4, 2018). "Ministers Are Selling Themselves to the Public, With Millions in Public Money" – "Even Knesset Has Ad Funded by Taxpayers, Preaching Democracy". The Times of Israel. Archived from the original on March 4, 2018. "A shift in criteria for government campaigns allows Miri Regev, Naftali Bennett, and others to voice their own accomplishments, and it's starting to sound a little off-key."

==== Tertiary ====
- Gorus, Reut, ed. (2021). Dictionary of Acronyms in Foreign Armies [מילון הקיצורים וראשי התיבות] (PDF) (in Hebrew). Israel: Israeli Ministry of Defense – Education and Training Division. p. 107.
