= Aardvark Israel =

Aardvark Israel is a Jewish educational organization founded in 2010 that offers gap year and semester abroad programs in Israel for young adults aged 17-21. The program operates primarily in Tel Aviv and Jerusalem and includes internships, Hebrew language study, academic courses for college credit, and cultural activities. It is a partner organization of Masa Israel Journey and a member of the Gap Year Association.

== Background ==
Gap year programs in Israel have been a long-standing part of Jewish and international educational pathways, with multiple organizations operating structured programs since the late twentieth century. Aardvark Israel was established in 2010 with offices in Tel Aviv and Jerusalem, as part of the broader ecosystem of Masa Israel Journey — a joint initiative of the Jewish Agency for Israel and the Israeli government designed to bring young Jews from around the world to Israel for extended programs.

== Programs ==
The Classic Track combines professional internship placements with Hebrew language instruction (ulpan) and weekly field trips throughout Israel. Participants may earn college credit through a partnership with the Jewish Theological Seminary.

The Tech Track is a coding bootcamp delivered in collaboration with Methodian, combined with startup internship placements in Israel's technology sector.

The Service Track provides community volunteer placements emphasizing civic engagement within Israeli society.

The Culinary Track places interns in culinary arts settings in Israel's food and hospitality industry.

The Nativ Track is offered in partnership with United Synagogue Youth (USY), focusing on Conservative Jewish studies. The track was relaunched in July 2025 in partnership with Aardvark Israel.

The Stand with Us track, developed in partnership with StandWithUs, provides training in Israel advocacy and public diplomacy at the Katz Education Center in Jerusalem.

== Affiliations ==
Aardvark Israel is a partner of Masa Israel Journey, maintains academic credit arrangements with the Jewish Theological Seminary, and is a member of the Gap Year Association.

== Recognition ==
Aardvark Israel received the Masa Prize for the 2019–2020 program year. According to self-reported figures, it has enrolled more than 2,315 alumni since founding.
