= Neil Lazarus =

British literary scholar (born 1953)

Neil Lazarus, FBA (born 1953) is a British literary scholar (born in South Africa) who specialises in postcolonial literature and postcolonial theory. He was professor of English and comparative literary studies at the University of Warwick from 1999 to 2020. He was elected a fellow of the British Academy in 2014.

== Publications ==
- Resistance in Postcolonial African Fiction (New Haven, CT: Yale University Press, 1990)
- Nationalism and Cultural Practice in the Postcolonial World (Cambridge: Cambridge University Press, 1999)
- (editor, with Crystal Bartolovich) Marxism, Modernity and Postcolonial Studies (Cambridge: Cambridge University Press, 2002)
- (editor) Cambridge Companion to Postcolonial Literary Studies (Cambridge: Cambridge University Press, 2004).
- The Postcolonial Unconscious (Cambridge: Cambridge University Press, 2011)
- Combined and Uneven Development: Towards a New Theory of World-Literature (Liverpool: Liverpool University Press, 2015)
