= George Adam Smith =

Scottish theologian (1856–1942)

Sir George Adam Smith FRSE FBA
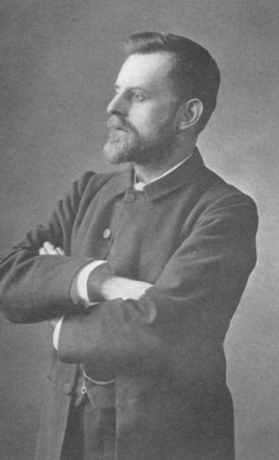
- George Adam Smith in 1895

Principal of the University of Aberdeen
- In office 1909–1935
- Preceded by: Reverend John Marshall Lang
- Succeeded by: Sir William Hamilton Fyfe

Personal details
- Born: 19 October 1856 Calcutta, India
- Died: 2 March 1942 (aged 85) Balerno, Edinburgh, Scotland
- Spouse: Alice Lillian Buchanan (m. 1889)
- Children: 7, including Alick, Baron Balerno and Janet
- Education: Royal High School, Edinburgh
- Alma mater: University of Edinburgh
- Profession: Theologian

Note in particular that this George Smith is to be distinguished from George Smith (Assyriologist) (1840–1876) who researched in some overlapping areas.

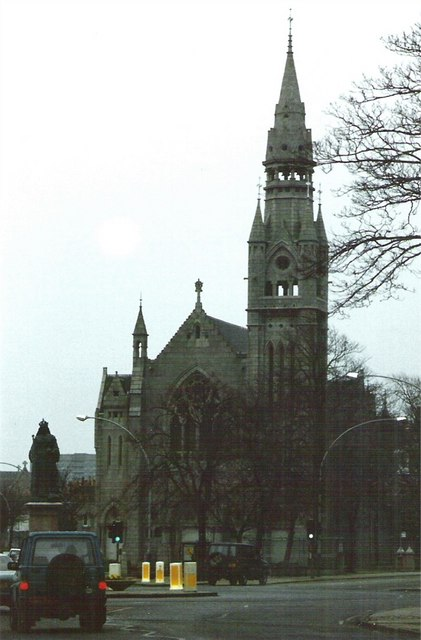
Queen's Cross Church, Aberdeen

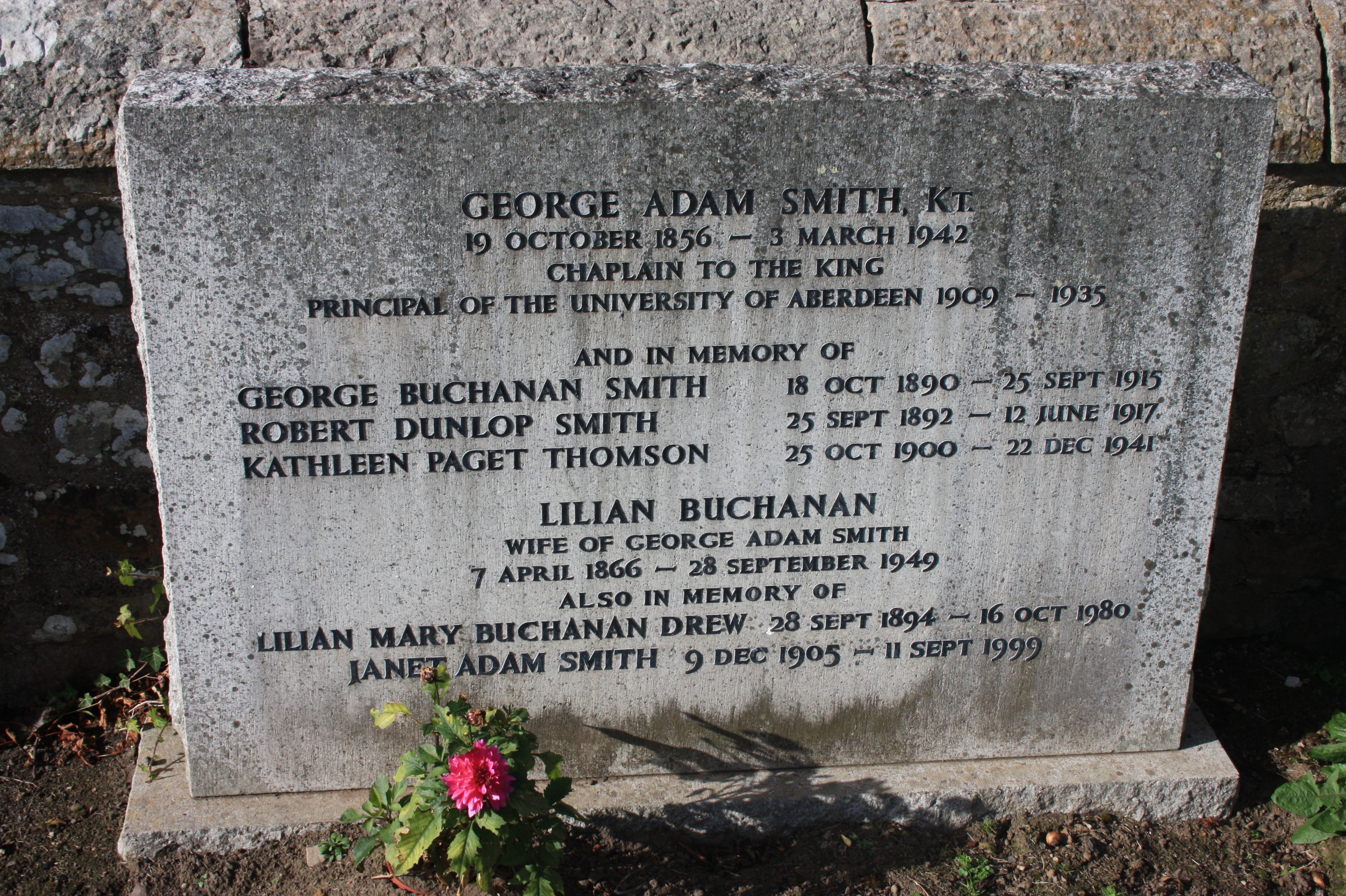
The grave of George Adam Smith, Currie Churchyard

Sir George Adam Smith FRSE, FBA (19 October 1856 – 3 March 1942) was a Scottish theologian. He was the Principal of the University of Aberdeen between 1909 and 1935 and an important figure in the United Free Church of Scotland. His magnum opus was The Historical Geography of the Holy Land, published in 26 editions between 1894 and 1935.

== Life ==
He was born in Calcutta, where his father, George Smith, C.I.E., was then Principal of the Doveton College, a boys' school in Madras. His mother was Janet Colquhoun Smith (née Adam). By 1870 the family had returned to Scotland and were living at Scagore House in Seafield, Edinburgh.

He was educated at Edinburgh in the Royal High School. He then studied Divinity at the University of Edinburgh and the New College, graduating MA in 1875.

After studying for summer semesters as a postgraduate at the University of Tübingen (1876) and the University of Leipzig (1878) and travelling in Egypt and Syria, he was ordained into the Free Church of Scotland in 1882 and served at the Queen's Cross Free Church in Aberdeen.

In 1892 he was appointed Professor of Hebrew and Old Testament subjects in the Free Church College at Glasgow. In 1900 (at its creation) he moved from the Free Church of Scotland to the United Free Church of Scotland.

In 1909, he was appointed Principal and Vice Chancellor of the University of Aberdeen, a post he held until his retirement in 1935. He was elected a Fellow of the British Academy in 1916, and was knighted in the same year.

He served as Moderator of the General Assembly of the United Free Church of Scotland in 1916-17.

In 1917, he was elected a Fellow of the Royal Society of Edinburgh. His proposers were John Horne, Cargill Gilston Knott, Ben Peach and John Sutherland Black.

He was appointed a Chaplain-in-Ordinary to King George V in 1933, and reappointed by King Edward VIII and King George VI.

From 1924 to 1938 he was Patron of the Seven Incorporated Trades of Aberdeen.

He died at home, "Sweethillocks" in Balerno south-west of Edinburgh on 3 March 1942. He is buried with his wife and children in the north-east corner of Currie Cemetery in south-west Edinburgh.

== Family ==
In 1889 he married Alice Lillian Buchanan (1866-1949), daughter of Sir George Buchanan MD FRS. They had seven children:

- George Buchanan Smith (1890-1915);
- Robert Dunlop Smith (1892-1917);
- Lilian May Buchanan Drew (1894-1980);
- Alick Buchanan-Smith, Baron Balerno (1898-1984);
- Kathleen Paget Thomson (1900-1941), married George Paget Thomson;
- Janet Adam Smith (1905-1999);
- Margaret Buchanan Smith Clarke (1910-2000).

== Works ==
- The Book of Isaiah (The Expositor’s Bible) (Vol.1., 1888)
- The Book of Isaiah (The Expositor’s Bible) (Vol.2., 1890)
- The Preaching of the Old Testament to the Age (1893)
- The Historical Geography of the Holy Land (1894-1935, 26 editions)
- Four Psalms: XXIII, XXXVI, LII, CXXI, Interpreted for Practical Use (1896)
- The Book of the Twelve Prophets (The Expositor’s Bible) (2 vols., 1896, 1898)
- The Life of Henry Drummond (1899).
- Modern Criticism and Preaching of the Old Testament (1901)
- Encyclopaedia Biblica (contributor) (1903)
- The Forgiveness of Sins, and other Sermons (1905)
- Jerusalem: The Topography, Economics and History from the Earliest Times to A.D. 70 (Vol 1., 1907)
- Jerusalem: The Topography, Economics and History from the Earliest Times to A.D. 70 (Vol 2., 1907)
- The Early Poetry of Israel in its Physical and Social Origins (the Schweich Lectures for 1910)
- War and peace: Two Sermons in King’s College Chapel, University of Aberdeen (1915)
- Atlas of the Historical Geography of the Holy Land (HGHL; 1915)
- Syria and the Holy Land (1918)
- The Book of Deuteronomy, in the Revised Version, with Introduction and Notes (1918)
- Our Common Conscience: Addresses delivered in America during the Great War (1919)
- Jeremiah (the Baird Lecture for 1922)
- The Kirk in Scotland 1560 – 1929 (with John Buchan) (1930)
- The Legacy of Israel (with others) (1944)
- The Book of the Twelve Prophets (1906)

== Bibliography ==
- Iain D. Campbell, Fixing the Indemnity: The Life and Work of Sir George Adam Smith (1856-1942) (Carlyle, Paternoster Press, 2004) (Paternoster Theological Monographs - PTM).

Academic offices
| Preceded by Reverend John Marshall Lang | Principal and Vice-Chancellor of the University of Aberdeen; 1909—1935 | Succeeded by Sir William Hamilton Fyfe |
