= A Place Among the Nations =

Non-fiction work by Benjamin Netanyahu

- Author: Benjamin Netanyahu
- Published: 1993

A Place Among the Nations is a 1993 book by Benjamin Netanyahu.
