= Haifa Declaration =

Document published by Mada-al-Carmel

The Haifa Declaration is set of orderly ideological and political doctrine challenging the Jewish character of the state of Israel. The document was published by Mada al-Carmel, a Haifa-based NGO that "generates and provides information, critical analysis, and diverse perspectives on the social and political life and history of Palestinians, with particular attention to Palestinians within Israel's 1948 boundaries." In the declaration, they call for a change in the ideological foundation on which Israel was established as the Jewish Homeland. The document include ten points framework which set 'The Future Vision of the Palestinian Arabs in Israel' and a proposed constitution which would remove the Jewish character of Israel.

The document calls upon Israel to recognize "Israeli responsibility" for the Nakba, presenting its "vision for achieving a dignified life in [their] homeland and building a democratic society founded upon justice, freedom, equality, and mutual respect between the Palestinian Arabs and Jews in Israel." The group calls on Israel to implement the Palestinian right of return and work towards a just two state solution.
