= Masa Israel Journey =

Israeli public-service organization

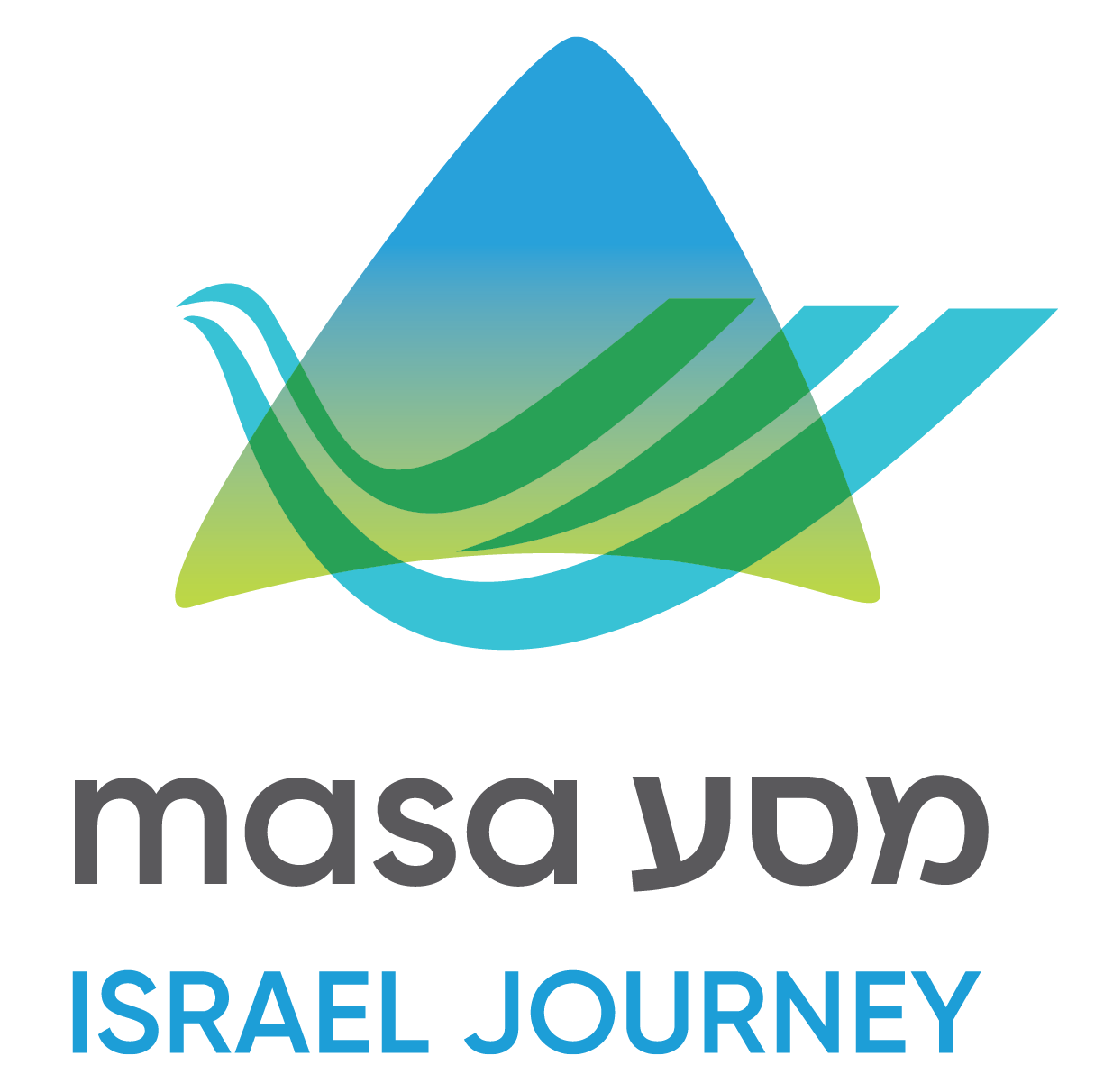
- Formation: 2004
- Founder: Ariel Sharon
- Headquarters: Jerusalem, Israel
- CEO: Meir Holtz
- Board of directors: Josh Schwarcz, Chair of the Board, Government Relations and Secretary General The Jewish Agency for Israel
- Website: masaisrael.org

Masa Israel Journey (or Masa Israel, Hebrew: מסע "journey") established in 2004 by the Jewish Agency and the Government of Israel, provides young Jewish adults in the diaspora with "transformative experiences" in Israel, spanning from 4 week to 10 month programs for ages between 16-50.

Since its founding in 2004, over 110,000 participants from more than 60 countries have taken part in Masa Israel programs The organization's eventual goal is to bring 20,000 young adults annually on semester- and year-long programs in Israel.

Masa Israel Journey offers eligible participants a grant of $500 - $4,500 towards participating in a program in Israel.

== History ==
Conceived by Israeli Prime Minister Ariel Sharon, Masa Israel was officially established in 2004 as a joint project of the Government of Israel and the Jewish Agency for Israel. Masa Israel is governed by a 16-member steering committee, with eight representatives of the Government of Israel and eight representatives of the Jewish Agency for Israel. The steering committee is co-chaired by the Government of Israel Cabinet Secretary and the Director General of the Jewish Agency for Israel.

During the 2004-2005 school year, $10 million was invested in the program, with 45 long term Israel programs participating. As of late 2009, the budget expanded to $40 million and the number of programs affiliated with the project has grown to over 200. The bulk of the budget goes to providing grants and financial aid to participants of affiliated programs. In 2015–16, participation reached an all-time high of over 13,000 participants.

Masa Israel is not officially connected to Taglit-Birthright Israel, though the organizations do collaborate regarding recruitment and education.

In 2009, Masa Israel and Hillel: The Foundation for Jewish Campus Life began working together expand reach on North American university campuses.

In January 2016, a new Israeli regulation was implemented allowing Masa Israel participants to receive 6-month Work Visas immediately upon completion of their programs. Minister of Interior, Aryeh Deri, and MK Nahman Shai, and Amos Arbel, led the effort to get this regulation passed.

== Program organizers ==
Independent organizations apply to be recognized by Masa Israel. Programs must include an educational curriculum, Hebrew instruction, and trips around Israel. Organizers include academic institutions like the Hebrew University of Jerusalem, Tel Aviv University, Haifa University, Technion- Israel Institute of Technology, IDC Herzliya and Ben Gurion University of the Negev.

In addition, Masa Israel oversees a number of Gap Year programs including Aardvark Israel and Jewish youth movements such as Young Judaea, Habonim Dror, Bnei Akiva, and Yeshiva programs.

== Funding ==
Half of Masa Israel's funding comes from the Government of Israel and the other half comes from the Jewish Agency for Israel, which is supported by the Jewish Federations of North America and Keren Hayesod-UIA. Participants on Masa Israel programs who identify as Jewish can receive grants and scholarships toward the cost of their program, with the amount depending on their age, the length of their program and their country of origin.
