= Ron Schleifer =

- רון שלייפר
- Born: 10 September 1957 (age 68)
- Education: Hebrew University
- Awards: Chaikin Award for Best Book on Strategy
- Scientific career
- Fields: Communication; Psychological Warfare
- Workplaces: Ariel University
- Thesis: Political Warfare in the Arab-Israeli Conflict (1999)

Ron Schleifer (Hebrew: רון שלייפר, born: 10 September 1957) is a senior lecturer in the School of Communication at Ariel University (AU), specializing in Psychological warfare, and head of the Ariel Center for Defence and Communication

== Early life and education ==
Ron Schleifer was born in Israel and served in the IDF in the years 1975–1979. He received his B.Sc. in History and International relations, and M.Sc. in Communication. Both from the Hebrew University in Jerusalem. He authored the thesis PLO Propaganda and Israeli Reactions under the supervision of Dr. Yehudit Elizur. His Ph.D. degree was received from the University of Leeds, UK, in 1999. Schleifer authored the thesis Political Warfare in the Arab-Israeli Conflict under the supervision of Prof. Philip Taylor and Dr. Robin Brown.

== Career ==
Schleifer was a lecturer at the Department of Political Studies in Bar Ilan University in the years 1997–2005. He then moved to the School of Communication at Ariel University (which was at that time an academic center), and from 2007 he is a senior lecturer at that school. In 2010 Schleifer won the Chaikin Award for Best Book on Strategy from the University of Haifa, for his book Psychological Warfare (Hebrew).

Schleifer is also a commentator on Israeli and foreign media on information warfare issues.

== Ariel Research Center for Defence and Communication ==
In 2010 Schleifer founded the Ariel Research Center for Defence and Communication and he heads it since. The center, which operates under the R&D authority at Ariel University, focuses on Information Warfare which includes cyberwar, psychological warfare, deception, and military-media interface. Specific research interests include the applications of Infowar to the Arab-Israeli Conflict from the British Mandate period until the present. The center also grants each year the Stephen Moldovan award for Original Military Literature.

== Professional work outside the university ==
- Researcher at the International Institute for Counter-Terrorism 2001-
- Researcher at the Begin–Sadat Center for Strategic Studies 1998–2010
- Lecturer at the Tactical Command College and Command and Staff College of the IDF 2001–2008
- Advisor to the IDF and other security organizations on psychological warfare and Information warfare 1998-

== Books ==
- Psychological Warfare in the Intifada: Israeli and Palestinian Media Politics and Military Strategies. Eastbourne, UK: Sussex Academic Press, 2006.
- Psychological Warfare. Tel Aviv, Israel: Ministry of Defense Publishing, 2007 (in Hebrew)
- Perspectives of Psychological Warfare in Contemporary Conflicts: Winning Hearts and Minds. Eastbourne, UK: Sussex Academic Press, 2011.
- Psychological Warfare in the Arab-Israeli Conflict. Hampshire, UK: Palgrave Macmillan, 2014
- Advocating Propaganda. Eastbourne, UK: Sussex Academic Press, 2014z
