= Shmuel Katz (politician) =

Israeli militant, politician and writer (1914 –2008)

- שמואל כץ
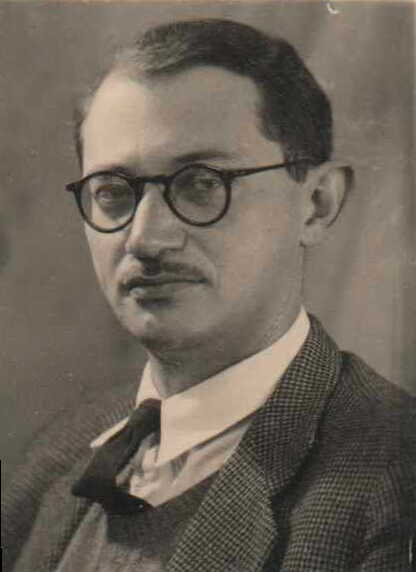

Faction represented in the Knesset
- 1949–1951: Herut

Personal details
- Born: 9 December 1914 Johannesburg, South Africa
- Died: 9 May 2008 (aged 93)

Shmuel "Mooki" Katz (Hebrew: שמואל "מוקי" כץ; 9 December 1914 – 9 May 2008) was an Israeli writer, historian and journalist. Prior to the formation of the State of Israel, he was a Zionist activist and member of the high command of Irgun, a proscribed paramilitary group. He was a member of the first Knesset and is also known for his biography of Jewish leader Ze'ev Jabotinsky.

== Biography ==
Katz was born in Johannesburg, South Africa. His parents were Alexander and Luba Katz. In 1930, he joined the Betar movement. In 1936, Katz immigrated to Mandatory Palestine as the secretary of Michael Haskel, the South African honorary consul. Soon after his arrival, he joined the Irgun. In 1939, he was sent to London by Ze'ev Jabotinsky to speak on issues concerning Palestine. While there he founded the revisionist publication The Jewish Standard and was its editor, 1939 to 1941, and in 1945.

In 1946, Katz returned to Mandatory Palestine and joined the HQ of the Irgun where he was active in the aspect of foreign relations. He was one of the seven members of the high command of the Irgun, as well as a spokesman of the organization. Katz also served as Irgun commander in Jerusalem during the War of Independence. Menachem Begin writes in The Revolt that Katz "was the officer responsible for Jerusalem until the dissolution of the military regiments of the Irgun Zvai Leumi."

== Political career ==
In 1977, Katz became "Adviser to the Prime Minister for Information Abroad" to Menachem Begin. He accompanied Begin on two trips to Washington, D.C., and was asked to explain some points to President Jimmy Carter. He quit this task on January 5, 1978, because of differences with the cabinet over peace proposals with Egypt. Katz was then active with the Tehiya party for some years and later with Herut – The National Movement after it split away from the ruling Likud.

== Literary career ==
Katz's Battleground: Fact and Fantasy in Palestine describes the roots of the Arab–Israeli conflict and seeks to refute anti-Zionist myths and Arab propaganda. Katz is the author of a two-volume biography of Jabotinsky entitled Lone Wolf, A Biography of Vladimir (Ze'ev) Jabotinsky. In addition, he published a regular column for many years in The Jerusalem Post.

=== Published works ===
==== Books ====
- Days of Fire (1966, Hebrew; 1968, English edition by Doubleday)
