= Nissim Malul =

Israeli journalist, translator and Zionist activist (1892–1959)

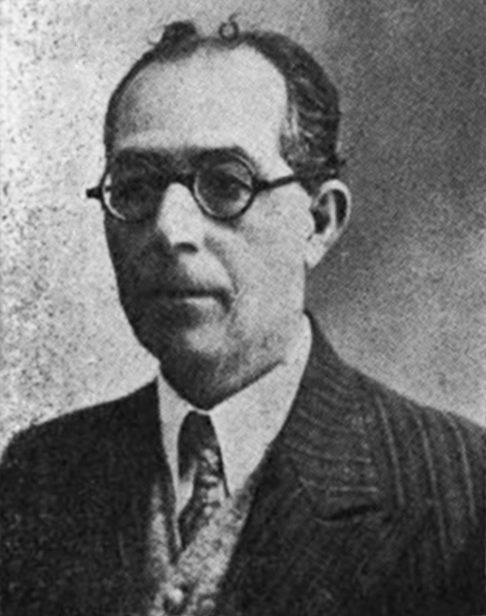
Dr. Nissim Malul

Nissim Jacob Malul (Hebrew: נִסים יעקב מָלוּל; April 1892 – March 1959) was a journalist, translator, playwright, historian, and Zionist activist who promoted Jewish-Arab cooperation in Palestine. He wrote for Arabic and Hebrew newspapers in Palestine, Egypt, and Lebanon and was employed by the Zionist Office in Jaffa under Arthur Ruppin.

== Biography ==
Malul was born in Safed, Ottoman Palestine in 1892 to a family of Tunisian descent who had come to live in the holy city two centuries earlier. When Malul was 8 years old, his father Rabbi Moses Hayyim, was appointed rabbi of the Jews of Tanta and Cairo. Malul was educated in Jewish schools in Cairo and Tanta and attended the American College of Tanta, studying Arabic literature, journalism, and philosophy. The Egyptian University (today known as Cairo University) appointed Malul as Hebrew lecturer in 1909, making him the first person to teach Hebrew at a university in Egypt.

In 1911 Malul returned to Palestine and wrote for Hebrew and Arabic journals. The same year he became the correspondent of the Egyptian newspaper Al Muqattam in Haifa and began writing for the paper. He attempted to promote the status of Hebrew in Egyptian higher education. Malul also began working for the Zionist Office in Jaffa, where his chief responsibility was to respond to anti-Zionist articles in Arab-Christian Palestinian newspapers such as Filastin and al-Karmil. Malul tried to establish a Jewish newspaper in Arabic, called Sawt al-‘Uthmaniyya (The Voice of the Ottomans), an initiative he believed would help quell Arab anti-Zionism. He partnered with his friend, fellow journalist, and Zionist thinker Shimon Moyal. With Moyal and his wife Esther Azhari Moyal, Malul founded Ha-Magen (the Shield), an organization of Mizrahi and Sephardi Jews whose goal was to respond to anti-Zionist arguments in the Arabic press and translate them into Hebrew. The association claimed one of its goals was the creation of greater understanding between Jews and Arabs in Palestine, and the promotion of peaceful relations with Arabs.

During World War I Turkish authorities suspected Malul of anti-Ottoman activities he was expelled to Damascus. From there he escaped to Egypt where he remained until the end of the war, serving as an officer of the Hebrew Battalion and a translator for the British. He returned to Palestine under the British Mandate. There, with funding from the Zionist Organization, Malul founded two Arabic newspapers, al-Akhbār and al-Salām. From 1922 to 1925 he was a member of the Zionist National Committee, and later he published in Ittiḥād al-ʿUmmāl, a Zionist-supported Arabic workers’ newspaper that attempted to raise class consciousness among Arab workers. From 1927 to 1929 he left Palestine for Iraq with his wife, Aliza, where he taught Arabic and Hebrew in a Jewish elementary school in Hila, Baghdad supported by the Anglo-Jewish Association.

Malul authored several books in Hebrew and Arabic, including two plays and a Hebrew-Arabic/Arabic-Hebrew dictionary, and he translated works between Arabic and Hebrew. He died in Tel Aviv in 1959.

== Views on Arabic language in Zionism ==
Malul published articles in the Hebrew newspaper Ha-Herut (Freedom), where he argued for the place of the Arabic language and culture within Zionism. In his 17 June 1913 article in Ha-Herut "Ma'amadenu ba-Aretz: She'elat Limud 'Ivrit-'Aravit" (מעמדנו בארץ: שאלת לימוד עברית-ערבית, translated as 'Our Status in the Land: The Question of Hebrew Teaching of Arabic'), he called for Arabic to be taught as a required subject in all Hebrew-Jewish schools in Palestine. He believed knowledge of Arabic was vital to the Zionist cause of fostering understanding with the Arabs of Palestine. He also advocated for Semitic Jewish nationalism, believing Arabic to be inseparable from Jewish culture, as they were both Oriental in origin.

In May 1913, Ya‘acov Rabinovitch, who saw arabophone Jews as "closer to the Arab bureaucrat or effendi than to us", criticized Malul in the Labor Zionist newspaper Ha-Po‘el ha-Tsa‘ir for advocating for Arab rights and for calling for Arabic to be taught in Jewish schools; he was especially critical of Malul's attempt to help Jewish Arabic teachers unionize, describing them as "pushers of foreign culture into our midst". Rabinovitch also attacked Malul's connections with Jews throughout the Arab Middle East including the Cairene comedian, playwright, and journalist Yaʿqūb Ṣanūʿ and the Jaffan author Shimʿūn Mūyāl.
