= Shimon Moyal =

Palestinian journalist, translator and Zionist activist (1866–1915)

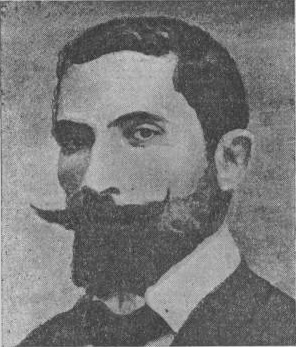
- Born: 1866; Jaffa, Ottoman Empire
- Died: 1915 (aged 48–49); Jaffa, Ottoman Empire
- Occupations: Physician; Translator
- Notable work: At-Talmud: Asluhu wa-tasalsuluhu wa-adabuhu
- Spouse: Esther Moyal (m. 1894)
- Parent: Yousef Moyal (father)

Shimon Moyal (Arabic: شمعون مويال; Hebrew: שמעון מויאל; 1866–1915) was a Zionist activist and physician. He worked for several newspapers and started a short-lived newspaper with his wife, Esther Moyal. He was the translator of the Talmud into the Arabic language.

== Early life and education ==
Moyal was born in Jaffa in 1866. His father was Yousef Moyal whose family were wealthy Jews from Morocco who settled in Palestine. Shimon's brother, David Moyal (1880–1953), was a lawyer and activist. Shimon attended Jewish religious schools in Palestine. Then he went to Beirut where he studied Arabic and French languages. Next he studied medicine in Cairo.

== Activities and career ==
During his studies in Cairo and later Moyal worked for different publications. One of them was Al Muqattam, a Cairo-based newspaper. He and his wife, Esther Moyal, returned to Palestine in late 1908 shortly after the Young Turk revolution in the Ottoman Empire.

In 1909 Moyal published an Arabic translation of Talmud entitled At-Talmud: Asluhu wa-tasalsuluhu wa-adabuhu (Arabic: The Talmud: Its Origin, Transmission, and Ethics) to make Judaism much more known by both Muslims and Christians who could read the Arabic texts. In 1913 he and his friend Nissim Malul launched a Jewish newspaper, Sawt Al Uthmaniyah (Arabic: the Voice of Ottoman), which was published in Arabic. The paper was edited by Moyal and his wife. Moyals and Malul also founded an association, Ha-Magen (Hebrew: The Shield), which aimed to answer to any hostile article against Zionism published in the Arabic publications. Another goal of the association was to encourage greater understanding between Jews and Arabs in Palestine and to support the peaceful relations with Arabs living in the region. Moyal was also very active in the Jaffa freemasonry society and participated in the activities of the Decentralization Party in Egypt (Al-Lamarkaziyah).

== Personal life and death ==
Moyal married a Beirut-born Jewish journalist Esther Al Azhari in 1894. They had a son, Abdullah Ovadia Nadim. He died in Jaffa in 1915 at the age of 49.
