= Battleground: Fact and Fantasy in Palestine =

- Author: Shmuel Katz
- ISBN: 0-929093-13-5

Battleground: Fact and Fantasy in Palestine (ISBN 0-929093-13-5) is a book about the Arab–Israeli conflict by Shmuel Katz. Katz analyzes the roots of the conflict and what he sees as the inseparable connection between modern and biblical Israel.

== Overview ==
In the book, Katz discusses the policies of the British in 1948, the continuous Jewish presence in Palestine, the bond of the Jewish People with the region, Jerusalem's religious history, the Arab claim to the region, the "myth" of the Arab refugee problem, Arab propaganda, Muslim fanaticism and terrorism.

One of his main conclusions is that there was never a "Palestinian Arab" nation, and to the Arab people as a whole, no such entity as Palestine has ever existed. This stands in clear contrast to the strong bond that the Jews always had with the land. The real purpose behind the Arab claims was, according to the author, the destruction of Israel as an entity of the Jewish people and not a response to Israeli violation of any political rights of another people.

Katz recalls that it was against the embryo state of pre-1948 war Israel that the Arabs declared and waged their war. The total area allotted to the Jewish state by the UN partition plan, amounting to little more than half of western Palestine, was roughly 15,000 square kilometers (about 6,000 square miles), including the semi-arid Negev. The Arabs were thus assured seven eighths of the totality of Palestina (Eretz Israel).

The seven independent Arab states in 1947 – Egypt, Iraq, Syria, Lebanon, Saudi Arabia, Yemen, and Transjordan – whose leaders decided to prevent the creation of Israel, contained an area 230 times larger than the projected Jewish state and a population 60 times that of its Jewish inhabitants, who numbered only 650,000. Such was the attitude of the Arabs in 1947, Katz claims, when they had in their hands all, and more than, the territory they are now demanding from Israel. At that time, they violently refused to share Palestine with the Jews in a territorial ratio of seven to one. They refused to recognize the Jewish claim to the country or to the smallest part of it; to acquiesce in the international recognition of that claim; or to abate this one jot of their designs on the whole of the area that had once been the Arab Empire.

Less than thirty years earlier, according to Katz's view, the "historic rights" of the Arabs to Palestine, allegedly existing for a thousand years, had not yet been discovered. In February 1919, the Emir Faisal, the one recognized Arab leader at the time, then still striving for the creation of Arab political independence in Syria (of which he was briefly king) and Iraq (over which he and his house subsequently ruled for forty years), signed a formal agreement with Dr. Chaim Weizmann, representing the World Zionist Organization. This provided for co-operation between the projected Arab state and the projected reconstituted Jewish state of Palestine. Borders were still to be negotiated, but Faisal had already described the Zionist proposals as "moderate and proper." The borders proposed by the Zionists included what subsequently became Mandatory Palestine on both banks of the Jordan River as well as north-western Galilee up to the Litani River – later included in southern Lebanon, part of the Golan Heights – later included in Syria—and part of the Sinai Peninsula – left under British administration in Egypt.

== Specific chapters ==
- In one of his chapters, Katz writes about the presence of the Jews in the Land of Israel ("Palestine"), explaining that it has gone unbroken since 1700 BCE, including the period between the destruction of the Second Temple by the Romans in 70 CE and the rebirth of the Jewish state in the 20th century. He makes clear that Jewish communities in Hebron have been continuous from 1500 until the 1929 Arab massacres of the Jews, as have been the Jewish communities in Safed, Tiberias and elsewhere.
- Another central issue is Katz's argument against the notion of "Palestinian refugees". Katz claims that the Arab refugees were not driven from Palestine by anyone – the vast majority left, whether of their own free will or at the orders or exhortations of their leaders, with the reassurance that their departure would help in the war against Israel. The Arabs are supposedly the only declared refugees who became refugees not by the action of their enemies or because of well-grounded fear of their enemies, but by the initiative of their own leaders. For nearly a generation, those leaders have wilfully kept as many people as they possibly could in degenerating squalor, preventing their rehabilitation, and holding out to all of them the hope of return and of "vengeance" on the Jews of Israel, to whom they have transferred the blame for their plight.

== Criticism ==
In a review for The New York Times, Nadav Safran wrote that "Katz devotes an entire chapter documenting the existence of every Jewish village in Palestine and the immigration of every band of Jews to it through the centuries since the destruction of the Second Temple in order to enhance the Jewish claim to the country. Yet, the Arab and Muslim rule there for near 1,200 years is not deemed by him sufficient ground to establish its claim to a national homeland in it. He asserts the fact that there was never a Palestinian Arab nation, as if three-fourths of the present members of the United Nations were not lacking the credentials he demands from the Palestinians"

== Use ==
It has been translated to many languages. An example to its popularity is that in placing its first order for paperbacks from Bantam Books, an official import company in the People's Republic of China selected this book together with two more.

In her work Divided We Stand: American Jews, Israel, and the Peace Process Ofira Seliktar wrote that the Jewish Defense League distributed Katz's book to bolster support for the Greater Land of Israel, "a policy, which, in its view, mandated the expulsion of the Palestinians from the territories". Pamphlets from Americans for a Safe Israel, co-founded by Katz in 1971, were later distributed along with copies of Battleground by the American Israel Public Affairs Committee and National Jewish Community Relations Advisory Council.
