= Esther Moyal =

Lebanese Jewish journalist (1874–1948)

- Born: Esther Lazari or al-Azharī; 1874; Beirut, Ottoman Empire
- Died: 1948 (aged 73–74); Jaffa
- Education: American College for Girls in Beirut or Syrian Protestant College
- Occupation: Writer Journalist Women's rights activist
- Spouse: Shimon Moyal (m. 1894)

Esther Moyal (née Lazari or al-Azharī; 1874, Beirut – 1948, Jaffa) was a Lebanese Jewish journalist, writer and women's rights activist. She has been described as a key intellectual in the 20th century Nahda, or Arab Renaissance.

== Biography ==
Raised in a middle-class Sephardic family originally from Syria, Moyal was fluent in Arabic, French, and English and was tutored by Arabic writer Muḥammad al-Bakr. She graduated with a degree in 1890, either from the American College for Girls in Beirut or the Syrian Protestant College. Moyal taught at Christian and Jewish schools and translated novels and novellas into Arabic, including the novels of Alexandre Dumas and Émile Zola.

She was active in several women's organizations in Beirut in the 1890s: the Lebanese Women's League, Bākūrat Sūriya ("The Dawn of Syria") and Nahdat al-Nisā' ("The Awakening Women"), a group she co-founded. Moyal represented Syria as a member of the Women's Congress at the 1893 World's Columbian Exhibition in Chicago.

In 1894, she married medical student, activist and journalist Shimon Moyal (Shim‘on Yosef Moyal) and the couple settled in Cairo. While in Cairo, Moyal contributed to Al-Fatat and Anis Al Janis. Then she founded the women's magazine al-ʿAila (The Family) of which the first issue appeared on 1 May 1899. Al-Aila became a weekly newspaper in 1904. The magazine was widely praised and contained articles on modern domestic issues, women's health, literary topics, and global news.

She was an outspoken supporter of women's rights. In the pages of The Family, she listed her three principles of feminism:

1. Woman is a moral being, possessor of a free will and active conscience

2. She is equal to man and the state of her existence is subject to his direction

3. Woman has special properties not found in man, and if he is superior to her in bodily strength and in willpower, then she is superior to him in the refinement of her feelings and the precision of her view; given the means of obtaining an education, she would match him in taste and in morals.

In response to a misogynistic journal article published in 1894, Moyal wrote a series of letters to the editor that summed up her vision of feminism: "I say that the woman who spends some small change on ink and paper, and spends her free time reading and writing and does not kill it with idle chatter, knows quite well how to manage her household and raise her children with the moderation, economy, and wisdom that assure both the happiness of her children and richness of her afterlife."

Inspired by the Dreyfus Affair, Moyal wrote a book on Émile Zola's life in 1903.

In 1908 (or 1909), the Moyal family moved to Jaffa, where Esther Moyal established an organization for Jewish women. She and Simon became joint editors of the periodical Sawt al-ʿUthmāniyya (The Voice of Ottomanism) in 1913. This Jewish newspaper written in Arabic countered attacks on Zionism and proposed a vision of a "shared homeland" in Palestine within the framework of the Ottoman Empire. Moyal's work was also published in Al Hasnaa, a women's magazine which was started in Beirut in 1909.

After Simon's death in 1913, Moyal lived with relatives in Marseilles; she returned to Jaffa in the early 1940s. Her son ʽAbdallāh (‘Ovadia) Nadīm became a poet.

Moyal's life and work presents a vision of a pluralistic Middle East dependent on free and open discourse. In her introduction to a set of biographies of Arabic women, Moyal wrote that she was thankful to live in an era "in which a large arena has been opened for the sages to disseminate their truths among peoples; for this has been the biggest ally in the advancement of knowledge and the greatest aid to its promulgation."
