= Egypt–Saudi Arabia relations =

- Egypt: Saudi Arabia

Diplomatic mission
- Embassy of Egypt, Riyadh: Embassy of Saudi Arabia, Cairo

Historically, relations between the Arab Republic of Egypt and the Kingdom of Saudi Arabia could be considered as extending several centuries back to the relations between earlier regimes in Egypt – the highly autonomous Egypt Eyalet in the Ottoman Empire and the Kingdom of Egypt – and the earlier manifestations of Saudi/Wahhabi power in the Arabian Peninsula (Emirate of Diriyah). Saudi Arabia and Egypt are both highly influential countries in the Arab world. Egypt is the most populous Arab country, and Saudi Arabia is a member of the G20. According to a 2013 Pew global opinion poll, 78% of Egyptians express a favourable view of Saudi Arabia, and 19% express an unfavourable view.

== 19th century ==
=== Muhammad Ali ===
Between 1811 and 1818 Ibrahim Pasha, son of Muhammad Ali of Egypt, governor of Egypt, led a campaign against the Emirate of Diriyah – as the First Saudi State was known – on behalf of the Ottoman Empire. Egyptian Armed Forces led by Ibrahim conquered Hejaz and Nejd and brought that first Saudi state to an end.

== 20th century ==
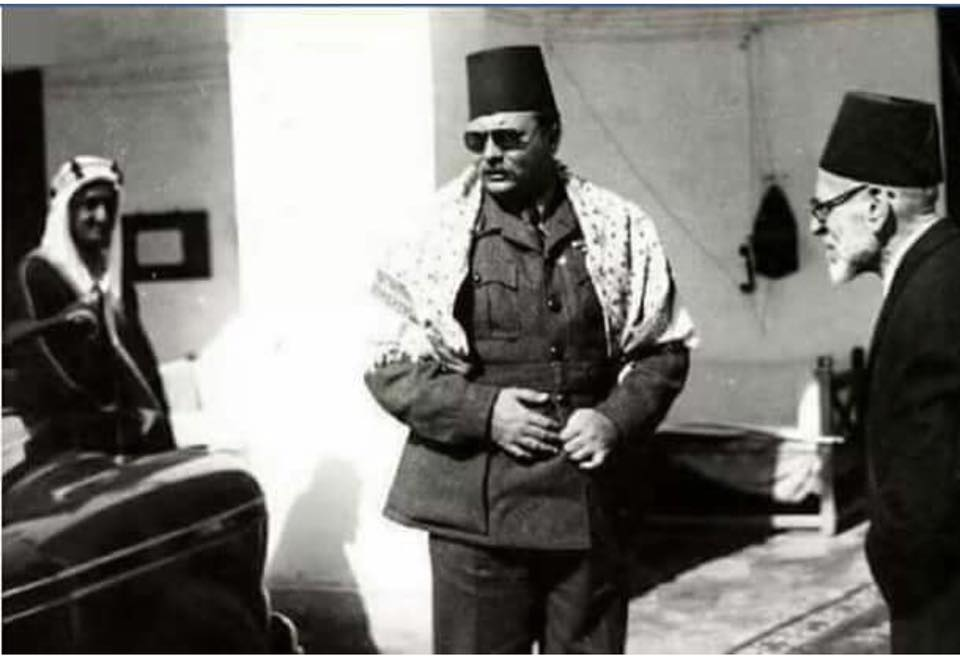
King Farouk and Prince Faisal at Egyptian Tekkiyah at Medina, 1945.

In 1924 King Abdulaziz attempted to improve the relations with the Kingdom of Egypt sending a cable to King Fuad on the inauguration of the first Egyptian Parliament. However, the relations between two states became strained after 1926 due to several reasons, including the caliphate issue and remained the same until 1936. On 7 May 1936 a treaty was signed by Egypt and Saudi Arabia in Cairo which included Egypt's recognition of Saudi Arabia as an independent and sovereign state. The treaty normalized the relations and initiated the diplomatic relations between two countries.

=== Gamal Abdel Nasser era ===
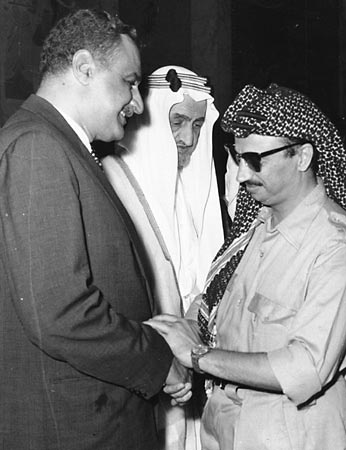
Egyptian President Gamal Abdel Nasser, King Faisal, and PLO Chairman Yasser Arafat meeting in 1970.

In the years immediately after the Egyptian Revolution of 1952 relations between Egypt and Saudi Arabia were cordial, driven by mutual suspicion of the Hashemites reigning in Jordan and (especially) Iraq at the time, and continuing from an anti-Hashemite alliance formed by King Abdulaziz of Saudi Arabia, King Farouk of Egypt and President Shukri al-Quwatli of Syria after the foundation of the Arab League in 1945. Subsequently, Nasser and King Saud co-operated to limit the reach of the Baghdad Pact, which they felt was designed to increase the influence of Hashemite Iraq. As a result, the two countries signed a bilateral military pact in 1955 and worked to successfully prevent Jordan from joining the Baghdad Pact. Egypt came to have extensive involvement in the Saudi army, economy and education system. However, the alliance was undermined by Saudi anxieties about the Egyptian government's promotion of anti-monarchical forces in the Arab World (including the uncovering of an Egyptian-style Saudi Free Officers Movement and increasing labour unrest). Egypt's increasing shift towards the Soviet Union, and efforts by Iraq and its western allies including the United States and the United Kingdom to drive a wedge between the two countries. By 1958 this deterioration in the relationship had led to King Saud offering a bribe of £1.9 million to Abdel Hamid al-Sarraj, the head of Syrian intelligence at the time and later vice-president of the United Arab Republic, to secure the assassination of Nasser.

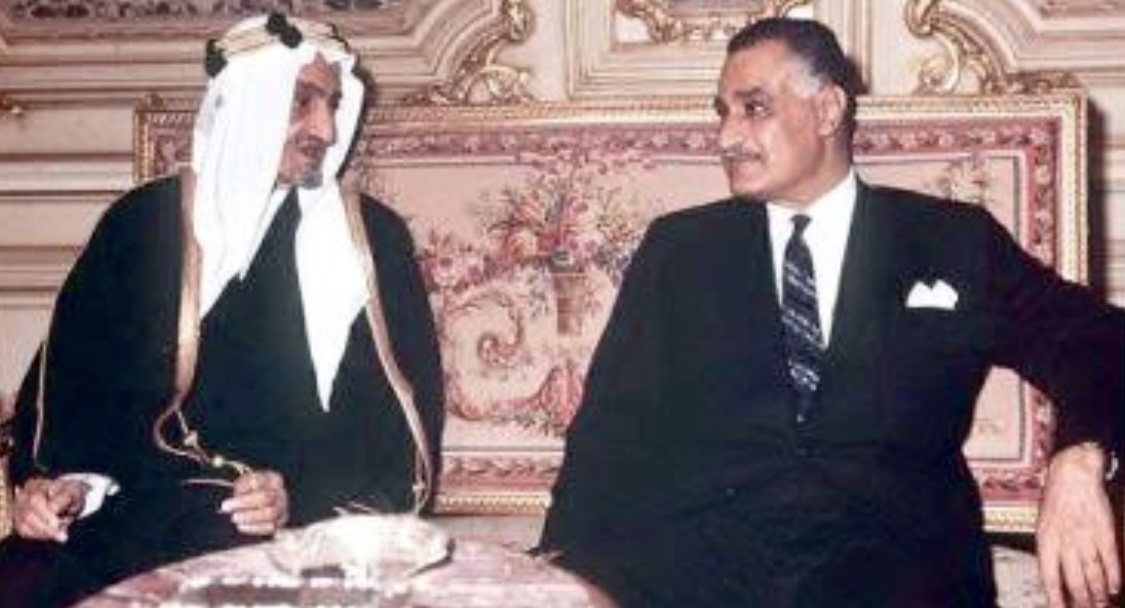
President Gamal Abdel Nasser and King Faisal in Cairo, 1969

Thus under President Gamal Abdel Nasser, Egypt, backed by the Soviet Union, came to represent the Non-Aligned Movement and pan-Arabism, and was a nominal advocate of secularism and republicanism. Pro-Nasser governments were often military dictatorships founded after a military coup against a conservative monarchy, such as Libya after the 1969 Libyan coup d'état. The Saudis, by contrast, were strong supporters of absolute monarchy and Islamist theocracy, and were generally close to the governments of the United Kingdom and United States. The Saudi-Egyptian rivalry was the main conflict of the Arab Cold War. For example, in the North Yemen Civil War, Nasser supported Arab republicans against the pro-Saudi Yemeni monarchy.

=== Anwar Sadat era ===
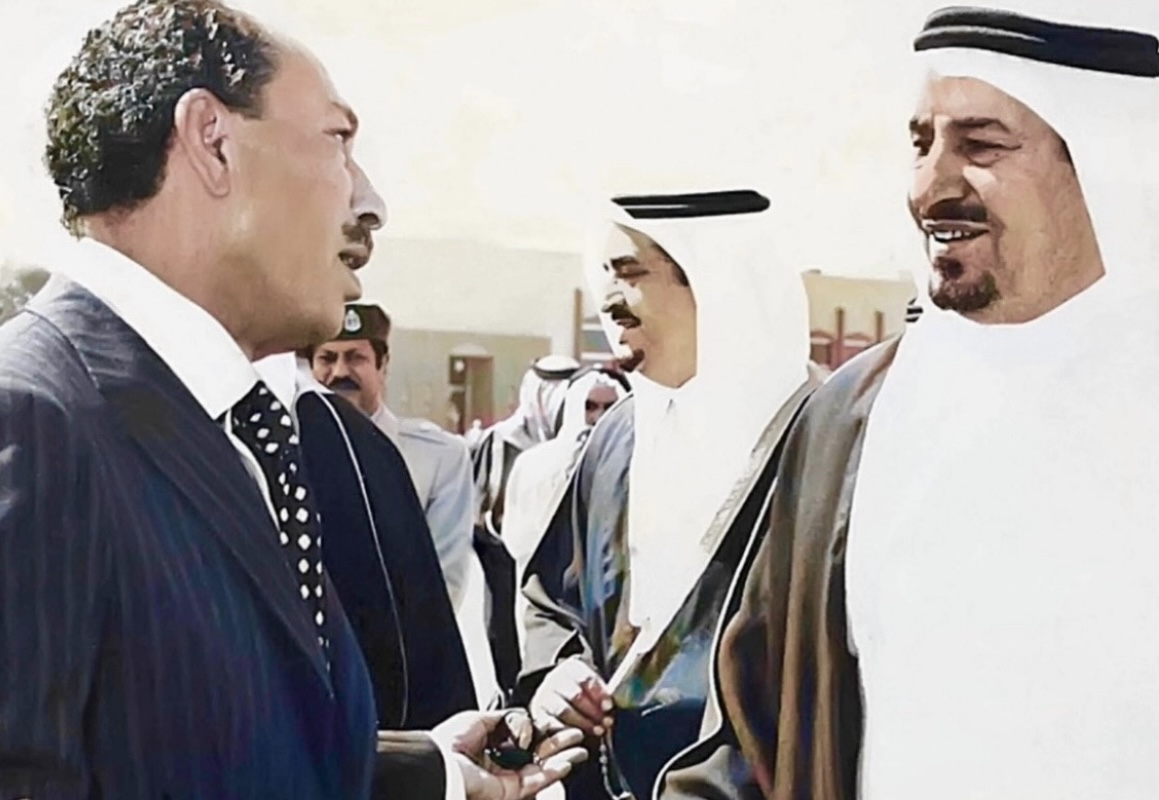
President Anwar Sadat receiving King Khalid upon the latter's arrival to Cairo Airport, July 1975

Relations between Egypt and Saudi Arabia warmed considerably during Sadat's rule, with the Saudis playing a key role in persuading Sadat to carry out the expulsion of 20,000 Soviet Armed Forces advisers from Egypt in 1972.

The Saudis also doubled the amount of money they sent to Egypt in subsidies in the early 1970s to $200 million a year, bought French Mirage fighter jets on the Egyptians' behalf to reduce their reliance on Soviet military technology, and offered low-interest loans to Egypt. In 1973 The Egyptian and Saudi governments also co-ordinated the October - Yom Kippur War with the OPEC oil embargo against Israel's western allies, leading to the 1973 oil crisis. Sadat agreed to end the Egyptian ban on the activities of the Muslim Brotherhood after Saudi requests to rehabilitate thousands of members of the movement who had been imprisoned or exiled, many of whom were granted asylum in Saudi Arabia.

However Saudi Arabia, along with the rest of the Arab League countries, suspended diplomatic relations with Egypt in protest of the Egypt–Israel peace treaty after the Arab League minister's meeting in Baghdad calling for an economic and diplomatic boycott of Egypt. And on 2 April 1979, the Saudi ambassador left Cairo.

=== Hosni Mubarak era ===
Mubarak's Egypt (1981 — 2011) continued the conservative dictatorship closely allied with the United States that started under Sadat, though sought to repair ties with the Arab nations broken in 1979. It would be another six years of Mubarak in office before the Arab League allowed individual countries to decide on their own relations with Egypt, and on 17 November 1987, King Fahd announced that Saudi Arabia would officially resume diplomatic ties with Egypt to bolster Arab solidarity. They followed Kuwait, the United Arab Emirates, Yemen, Morocco and Iraq. A solidarity that was needed in light of the Iran-Iraq war.

During the boycott, Saudi - Egyptian relations continued in non-political sectors such as culture and some aid, where prince Talal bin Abdulaziz made a rare visit during the boycott by a high level member of the Saudi royal family to Egypt in 1984 as UNICEF envoy and head of the Arab Gulf Program for the United Nations Development (AGFUND), inaugurating projects funded by the agencies, and meeting the influential Minister of Information, Safwat al-Sharif. During his visit, Talal praised the civilian role of the armed forces and stated how "Egypt is the heart of the Arab World and is indispensable."

Nevertheless, over Mubarak's three decade rule, there remained a rivalry between the two countries, both aspiring to preeminence in the Arab World in general and among the Arab allies of the US in particular. This rivalry manifested itself, for example, when U.S. President Barack Obama made a major tour of the Middle East in 2009, soon after assuming power. The Saudis resented Obama's choice of Cairo as the venue for making a key policy speech, and State Department officials made an effort to mollify them by following up the Cairo speech with a high-profile Presidential visit to the Saudi capital.

During the 2011 Egyptian revolution, Saudi King Abdullah expressed support for Hosni Mubarak. "No Arab or Muslim can tolerate any meddling in the security and stability of Arab and Muslim Egypt by those who infiltrated the people in the name of freedom of expression, exploiting it to inject their destructive hatred. As they condemn this, the Kingdom of Saudi Arabia and its people and government declares it stands with all its resources with the government of Egypt and its people." He condemned the "people who tried to destabilise the security and stability of Egypt."

== 2011–present ==
=== 2012 Saudi Arabia embassy lock-up ===
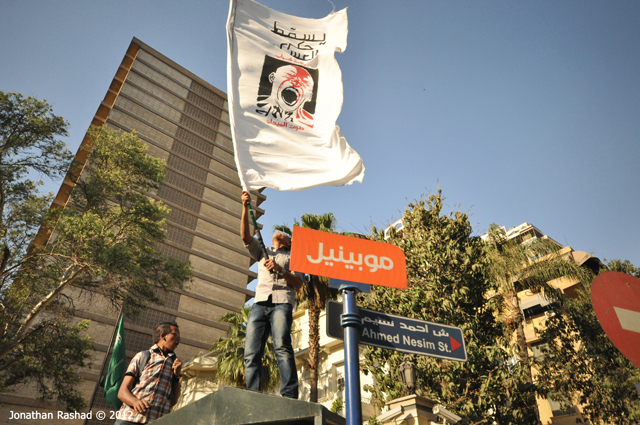
A protester outside the Saudi Embassy in Cairo holds up a flag saying "Down with Military Rule"

On 28 April 2012, Saudi Arabia announced the closure of its Cairo embassy and its consulates in Alexandria and Suez, following Egyptian protests over the detention of the Egyptian lawyer Ahmed al-Gizawi in Saudi Arabia.

Earlier in April 2012, al-Gizawi was detained shortly after his arrival in Saudi Arabia, which some believe was because he defamed King Abdullah by filing a lawsuit in a South Cairo court against Saudi monarch King Abdullah on behalf of Egyptian citizens held without charge in Saudi prisons. Saudi authorities said he was arrested at the King Abdulaziz International Airport near Jeddah on 17 April for possession of 21,000 Xanax anti-anxiety pills, which are banned in the country. They expressed doubt that he intended to go on a pilgrimage, as he was not wearing the typical white pilgrim dress (Ihram). According to his wife, he was sentenced in absentia to a year in prison and 20 lashes after he arrived for a pilgrimage.

An estimated 1,000 Egyptian protesters demonstrated in front of the Saudi embassy in Cairo on 27 April, demanding the release of al-Gizawi and of the other Egyptians held in Saudi jails. Following the protests Saudi authorities announced the closure of the Saudi embassy and other consulates in Egypt. Egypt's head of military council, Mohamed Hussein Tantawi, said Egypt is working to heal the rift with Saudi Arabia over the surprise decision. Observers said that it is the worst fall-out in relations between the two countries since Saudi Arabia severed its ties with Egypt in 1979.

=== Reconciliation ===
Soon after the embassy incident, Saudi Arabia announced that they would return ambassador Ahmad Abdulaziz Kattan and his envoy to Egypt after feverish efforts by Egyptian politicians, fearing the loss of aid, to gain back Saudi favor. King Abdullah said that he could "not allow this passing crisis to go on for long".

On 10 May 2012, ambassador Kattan announced that the kingdom agreed to provide US$500 million in aid to Egypt and will deposit an additional US$1 billion at the country's central bank as part of the $2.7 billion support package they had agreed in 2011. Saudi Arabia will also export $250 million worth of butane to Egypt, which has faced ongoing shortages of the fuel, as well as US$200 million to help small and mid-sized firms. The donation was part of a move by multiple Gulf states to send a large aid package to Egypt.

=== Visit of Morsi ===
Egyptian President Mohamed Morsi's first official visit was to Saudi Arabia in July 2012, although he was the presidential candidate of the Muslim Brotherhood, whose views are not fully aligned with those of the Saudi government. At the time, Saudi journalist Jamal Khashoggi stated that Saudi Arabia is a pragmatic country and that whoever the president of Egypt is, Saudi government is aware of the fact that it has to maintain good relations with this country.

=== After July 2013 ===
Saudi Arabia was among the various countries that explicitly welcomed the appointment of the interim government following the July 2013 removal of Morsi from office. Soon afterward, relations between the two countries improved greatly.

In April 2016, King Salman of Saudi Arabia made a five-day visit to Egypt, during which the two countries signed economic agreements worth approximately $25 billion and also made an agreement to "return" Tiran and Sanafir, two Egyptian-administered islands in the Gulf of Aqaba, to Saudi control. The announcement of the transfer of the islands provoked a backlash in Egypt, in both social media and traditional media, including outlets which had been firmly supportive of the Egyptian president Abdel Fattah el-Sisi.

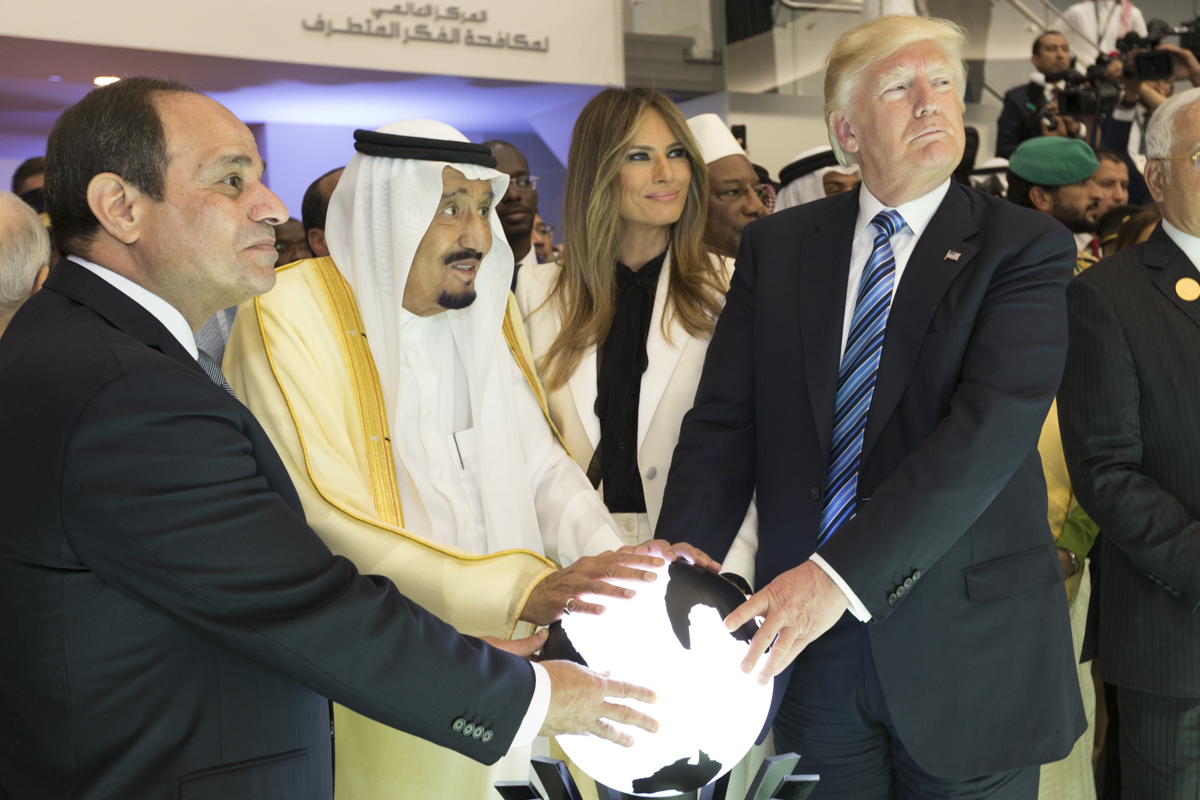
Saudi King and Egyptian President and Donald Trump at the Riyadh Summit in 2017.

Over the issue between Saudi Arabia and Egypt on Sanafir and Tiran, talks between Yitzhak Molcho from Israel and Sameh Shoukry, the Foreign Minister of Egypt, were leaked, according to the Middle East Monitor. The Muslim Brotherhood is linked to the "Middle East Monitor". The Middle East Eye leaked the audio. Muslim Brotherhood supporters are connected to the "Middle East Eye". Eric Trager noted that the tape was leaked by an agency run by the Muslim Brotherhood.

Egypt has also strongly backed the Saudi stance during the Qatar diplomatic crisis.

In 2019, Saudi Arabia pledged an amount of $7 million for developmental projects in Egypt.

In May 2021, the embassy of Saudi Arabia in Egypt said that citizens traveling to Egypt have to buy an entry visa upon arrival for $25 and can pay immediately on arrival. On March 12, 2025, the Parliament of Egypt approved a bilateral investment protection agreement with Saudi Arabia. The agreement aims to enhance capital inflows, generate employment opportunities, and strengthen economic relations between the two countries.

== Resident diplomatic missions ==
- Egypt has an embassy in Riyadh and an consulate-general in Jeddah.
- Saudi Arabia has an embassy in Cairo and an consulate-general in Alexandria.

== See also ==
- Foreign relations of Egypt
- Foreign relations of Saudi Arabia
- Egypt Conquest of Nejd
- Arab Cold War
- Arab Spring
