= I24NEWS (Israeli TV channel) =

Israeli television news channel

i24NEWS
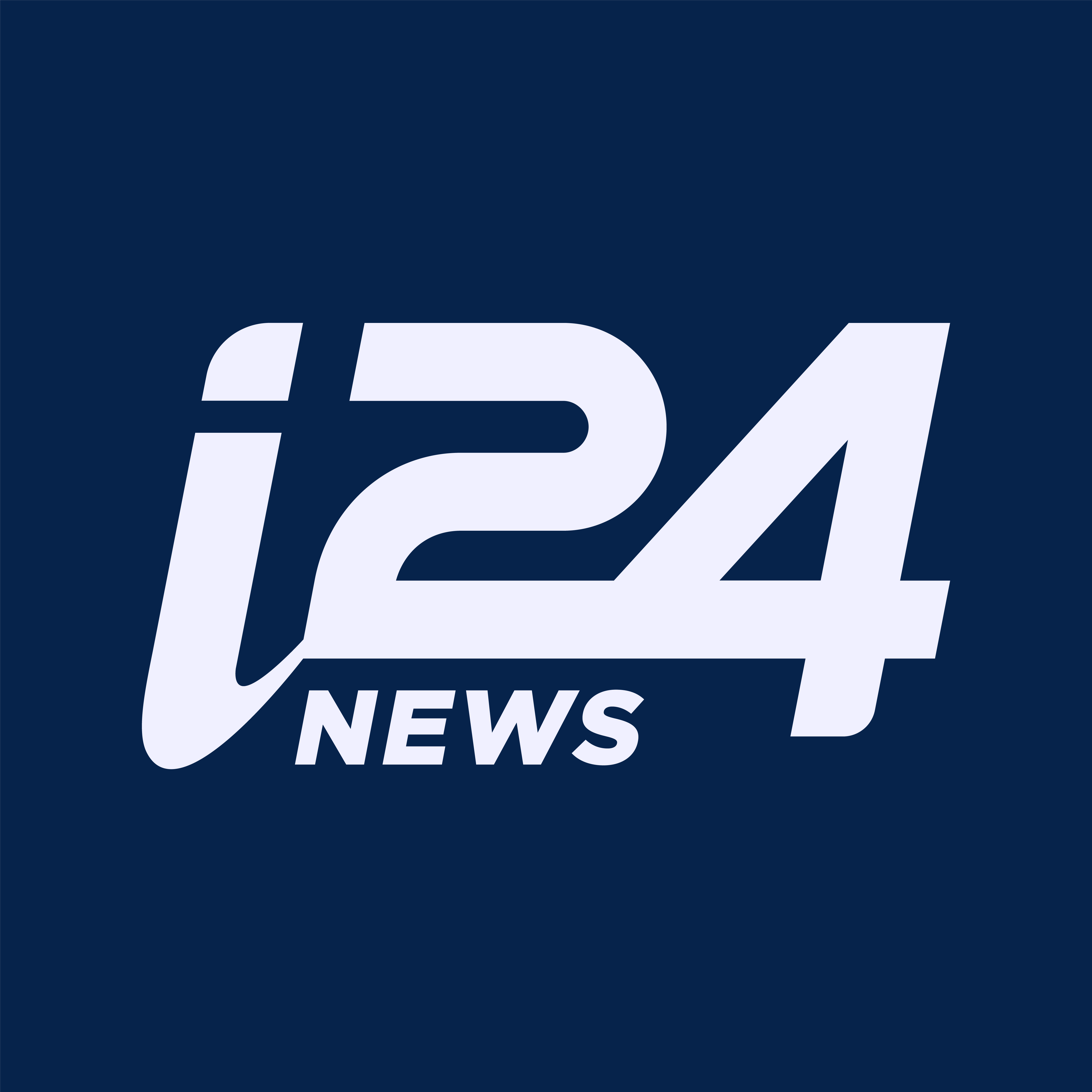
- Country: Israel
- Broadcast area: Worldwide; Canada; United States
- Headquarters: Jaffa Port, Tel Aviv

Programming
- Languages: English, Spanish, French, Arabic, Hebrew
- Picture format: HDTV 1080i

Ownership
- Owner: Patrick Drahi

History
- Launched: 17 July 2013; 13 years ago

Links
- Webcast: https://video.i24news.tv/
- Website: https://www.i24news.tv/en

i24NEWS is a 24-hour news television from Israel, broadcasting from the Jaffa Port near Tel Aviv. It is mainly financed and founded by Franco-Israeli telecoms tycoon Patrick Drahi. By 2013 the channel employed 150 journalists locally and 20 foreign correspondents. Israel's government press office head Nitzan Chen praised the launch as "excellent news" and the former ambassador of Israel to France Daniel Shek said i24NEWS was "the most ambitious media project launched in Israel". It broadcasts in French, English, Hebrew, and Arabic. The channel was founded by Patrick Drahi, with Frank Melloul serving as its first CEO. In 2025, Ronit Ganon-Amit was appointed CEO of i24NEWS, while Frank Melloul was promoted to chairman.

In early 2017, the channel paired up with the US to expand their channel. By 2018, the company had studios in Tel Aviv, Paris, New York City, Washington, D.C., and Los Angeles. In September 2021, following the Abraham Accords, the channel received a broadcasting license from the United Arab Emirates and opened its Gulf bureau in Dubai Media City. In May 2022, the channel launched its operations in Morocco with two new bureaus in Rabat and Casablanca.

In June 2024, i24NEWS launched a Hebrew language channel, the fourth channel of the network. This version is not available on conventional cable and satellite providers in Israel.

== History ==
The channel went live on 17 July 2013. Melloul stated that it would battle prejudice and ignorance about Israel with "facts and diversity".

Arab Israeli journalist Lucy Aharish was the lead anchor of the English-language branch of the channel from July 2013 until she left in January 2016. Her show, The News Today, was replaced by News Now with Merav Savir. News Now was canceled after only a few months of broadcasting, ahead of changes to the network.

In 2020, following the Abraham Accords, i24NEWS signed a variety of memorandum of understanding and partnership agreements with leading companies in the UAE. i24NEWS became the first Israel-based channel to be broadcast in the UAE. In 2021, the channel received a UAE broadcast license and launched its studios in Dubai Media City, the regional hub for media organizations in the Gulf.

In 2022, i24NEWS launched its operations in Morocco, Rabat and Casablanca.

On 29 October 2023, the i24 launched i24 Freedom, a 24-hour international channel devoted to the ongoing Gaza war.

On 30 June 2024, i24NEWS launched a Hebrew language channel. The feed received criticism for countering Miri Michaeli's launch speech that the channel was not a one-sided outlet, while Maariv journalist Miki Levin derided it as "Channel 14 in a suit" days before it launched.

=== i24 News (America) ===
On 8 December 2016, all programming on the English channel officially ended in preparation for launching in America. The channel broadcast 10 minutes of news on the hour from 0800 to 2300 (local time), replacing "Morning Edition", "The Daily Beat" and "The Lineup". The launch of i24NEWS in the United States was announced on 27 January 2017. The network began broadcasting in the U.S. on February 13, 2017. It is live from 6 to 10 p.m. Eastern Time and at other times broadcasts from Israel.

The channel is operated out of its headquarters in Jaffa.

Live programming is broadcast from Times Square in New York City, with an additional bureau in Washington, D.C. Approximately 50 journalists were hired to staff the two locations. The channel uses resources from its Jaffa headquarters.

Initial distribution was limited to the Optimum system. In November 2017, Spectrum began to roll out the channel nationwide. December 2019, it was added to AT&T U-Verse on channels 223 and 1223.

Among the first journalists hired were Michelle Makori, anchor and editor-in-chief; David Shuster, managing editor; and Dan Raviv, who previously worked at CBS News. The channel acquired many of its debut behind-the-scenes talent from the former Al Jazeera America. The channel was nominated for an International Emmy Award for its coverage of the 2016 Republican convention.

== Distribution ==
i24NEWS started broadcasting in Israel on August 29, 2018. It is offered in France (including the French West Indies), Belgium, Luxembourg, Switzerland, Italy, Spain, Portugal, Poland and across the African continent. The channel streams live in all three languages via its website, mobile app, and dedicated smart TV app.

The channel signed an agreement enabling it to be broadcast in Germany on Kabel Deutschland. i24NEWS was initially broadcast in the United States via the Jewish Life Television network, but following the acquisition of Cablevision by Drahi-owned Altice USA (formerly Cablevision with a public brand of Optimum), i24NEWS is now broadcast on many US cable and TV operators, among them: Optimum channel 14, Verizon Fios channel 610, DirecTV channel 343, U-verse TV channel 223, Suddenlink channel 49, Mediacom channel 228, Xfinity channel 1118, Spectrum, FuboTV and others. Additionally, i24NEWS is on multiple streaming services: Amazon Fire TV, Apple TV, Roku, Android TV, Samsung Smart TV, And they also have a i24NEWS app on both Android and IOS App Stores.

i24NEWS English is available in the UK, along with a number of other international news channels, via online video subscription service NewsPlayer+.

In January 2021, i24NEWS became the first Israeli-based channel available in the UAE, on the country's leading content provider Etisalat. Later that year, DU became the second operator to add the channel to its subscribers in the UAE.

From October 2021 to early February 2026, i24NEWS waws available in Australia on the Flash News streaming service. This ended when Flash News closed on 9 February 2026.

== Key people and programming grid ==
Ali Waked, is the Director of i24NEWS’s International Branch and manages content and editorial direction in English, French, and Arabic.

Anchors at i24NEWS past and present include:

- Nicole Zedeck, anchor, The Rundown and i24NEWS NEWSDESK
- Benita Levin, anchor, The Rundown and i24NEWS NEWSDESK
- Emily Frances, anchor, Holy Land Uncovered
- David Matlin, anchor
- Natasha Kirtchuk, anchor
- Laura Cellier, anchor, Middle East Now
- Ellie Hochenberg, anchor

Correspondents at i24NEWS:

- Ariel Oseran: Middle East correspondent
- Robert Swift: Defense correspondent
- Joe Brown: Senior Correspondent
- Bianca Zanini: Correspondent
- Balig Sladeen: Correspondent

In November 2025, i24NEWS has introduced a new English-language programming schedule. The grid includes shows such as The Rundown, broadcast daily, Middle East Now, focused on regional developments, and Global Eye, which covers international affairs. Additional programs, including Jewish World Weekly, Innov'Nation, and On The Record, complete the network's updated lineup.

In the US, the news team includes:

- Michelle Makori – Host of ClearCut and Crossroads
- Michael Shure – National correspondent and fill in host
- David Shuster – Host of Stateside and Crossroads

In the US, programming team includes:

- i24NEWS DESK, previously called The News, a 10-minute news bulletin (occasionally 26 minutes) at the top of the hour and half past
- Daily Dose
- Perspectives
- The Rundown
- Debrief
- Crossroads
- ClearCut
- Stateside

== See also ==
- I24NEWS (United States)
- International news channels
- Television in Israel
