= Follow That Goblin! =

1992 claymation Halloween special

- Written by: Ruth Ebenstein
- Directed by: Jonathan Lubell (possibly uncredited).
- Voices of: Daniel Diker; Elesheva Eshet Eliel; Chaya Golinkin; Daniel W. Rickin
- Country of origin: United States
- Original language: English

Production
- Producer: Jonathan Lubell
- Editors: Michael Horak; Yoram Tal; Yair Tamir
- Running time: 28 minutes
- Production companies: Scopus Films; Family Home Entertainment; One Eighty One Productions

Original release
- Network: CBS
- Release: 1992

Follow That Goblin! is a 1992 direct-to-video claymation musical Halloween special produced by Scopus Films, which produced and released Follow That Sleigh! in 1990, and One Eight One Productions, written by Ruth Ebenstein, produced and directed by Jonathan Lubell. It stars Daniel Diker (the president of the Jerusalem Center for Public Affairs), Elesheva Eshet Eliel, Chaya Golinkin, and Daniel W. Rickin. It centers on siblings Scott and Abby, who befriend a goblin named Gerbert, who lost his will to scare anybody while helping him save the haunted house from being torn down to make room for a video arcade.

Follow That Goblin! premiered on CBS on Sunday, August 16, 1992, the same day it was released on VHS by Family Home Entertainment on August 16, 1992, and it aired on BBC One in 1992 and on BBC Two in 1999.

The special was received with mixed reviews, mostly negative reviews. It has a rating of TV-Y7.

== Plot ==
At a carnival on Halloween night, Scott and his sister Abby tour the haunted house, which is a dark ride, on its final night. They find out from both I.M. Ruthless, the foreman of Ruthless Wreckers, Inc., his wrecking crew, and the ticket lady that the haunted house will be torn down to be replaced by a drive-thru video arcade because it isn't scary anymore. The two board the train, and upon entering the haunted house, encounter animatronic monsters and ghosts and bats as the train passes through Frog Farm and The Bat's Cave. They arrive at The Goblin's Lair, where they meet Gerbert the Goblin, a goblin who is unable to scare anybody. After Gerbert falls backwards out of the window, Abby helps him up, and they end up missing the train, which leaves them trapped in the murky mansion. Scott and Abby tell Gerbert that the haunted house will be torn down to be replaced by the video arcade. Gerbert admits that the only monster who has been outside is M.G. Pumpkin, a rapping, rhyming Jack O'Lantern - headed monster, and they go look for him. After getting lost, they accidentally go through a revolving bookshelf, and fall into a giant paper trick or treat bag, where they find M.G. Pumpkin, who gives Gerbert a piece of candy, and tells them in rap that Esmerelda, a witch, who runs the haunted house, has been outside, and that the annual Halloween Ball is tonight. After Gerbert warns him about the haunted house's soon-to-be destruction, M.G. Pumpkin disregards the warning, and tells him to have fun and dance. Scott, Abby, and Gerbert end up back in the hallway, where Scott chatazises Gerbert for his inability to scare people, calling him a clown. After Abby defends Gerbert, Scott abandons them to find his own way out, and Abby falls through a hole in the floor, where a giant snake lives at the bottom of the pit. Gerbert stretches his arms out and grabs Abby, saving her from being eaten by the giant snake. Esmerelda watches them in her crystal ball, and spies Scott, who gets lost, only to meet The Purple Glop, a Blob-like monster, who gives him junk food and lets him watch a small T.V. set, hypnotizing him, singing that they'll "open up a candy stand", and lures him through a door. Meanwhile, Abby and Gerbert get imprisoned, and Gerbert blames himself for being unable to scare anybody. Abby, aided by cute, little monsters, sings to Gerbert the joys of him being himself, boosting his newfound confidence. After Gerbert truly becomes scary, he and Abby go to find Scott, who gets taken to Esmerelda by The Purple Glop. Scott meets Esmerelda and her black and white bicolor cat, and after Esmerelda raps about herself and her black magic, showing him her "trophies" (including a plaque with Scott's name on it), she turns him into a frog. Scott escapes, and reunites with Abby and Gerbert, and they go to The Halloween Ball, with Scott wearing Groucho glasses, and Abby disguised as a ghost. At the Halloween Ball, after both Olly Overbite, a Dracula-like vampire, and Greta Gorgon, a reptilian gorgon, are each given a "Halloween Award", Abby nominates Gerbert as "The Scariest Monster", much to the mocking laughter and ridicule of the other monsters. Gerbert raps and sings about how scary he truly is, and tells the monsters about how I.M. Ruthless and his wrecking crew will destroy the haunted house to make room for the video arcade at midnight. Esmerelda teleports herself to the Halloween Ball, and attempts to turn him into something, but gets interrupted by I.M. Ruthless and his wrecking crew, who start tearing down the haunted house outside. Gerbert rallies the monsters and ghosts to join forces and save the haunted house. The monsters scare off the wrecking crew easily, except I.M. Ruthless, who gets scared off out of his wits by Gerbert, riding off on his jackhammer as a pogo stick. Gerbert and the monsters celebrate, with Gerbert being praised and cheered for his newfound ability to scare people. Esmerelda turns Scott back into a human, and as the sun rises, Scott and Abby go home, and Scott lets out a final "Ribbit", and Gerbert waves them goodbye as the haunted house closes its doors.

Before the end credits, Frankie, a Frankenstein's monster, introduces the monsters such as The Transylvanian Mummy, himself, The Wolfman, Olly Overbite, Greta Gorgon, The Purple Glop, M.G. Pumpkin, Esmerelda the Witch, and "The Star of tonight's show, Gerbert Goblin!".

During the end credits, Esmerelda sings "You Can Be What You Wanna Be".

== Cast ==
- Daniel Diker as Gerbert Goblin, M.G. Pumpkin, I.M. Ruthless
- Elesheva Eshet Eliel as Esmeralda
- Chaya Golinkin as Abby
- Daniel W. Rickin as Scott

A.W. Anchor, Frieda Levey, Ma'Ayan Lubell, Yoav Orbach, Ezra Resnick, Hannah Roth, and Misha Immanuel also star as additional voices.

== Production ==
=== Animation ===
After the success of Follow That Sleigh! in 1990, Scopus Films began production of Follow That Goblin!, with Dick Codor, having previously served as the director of Follow That Sleigh!, serving as the art director. The animation was produced at Scopus films, mainly by Cote Zellers (who would later direct the animation segments for Gullah, Gullah Island on Nick Jr., KaBlam! on Nickelodeon, mainly for the Prometheus and Bob segments, and I Spy on HBO Family), Billy Greene (who starred in The Cape Canaveral Monsters (1960) as Dr. Heinrich von Hofften), Eric Fogel (who would later direct Celebrity Deathmatch and create cult shows such as The Head, Daria (which he voiced an angry neighbor in "Cafe Disaffecto" and "The Invitation"), Starveillance, and Glenn Martin, DDS), and Jim Tozzi (who would later create Xavier: Renegade Angel and star as various voices on Wonder Showzen). The animation was managed by Becky Wible Searles, who was the owner of One Eighty One Productions, Inc. for 14 years, alongside co-owner Robert Niosi, and was known for her work for the networks Nickelodeon, CBS, Showtime, National Geographic magazine, the Kool-Aid commercials, the American multinational telecommunications holding company AT&T, and the American educational PBS children's television series, Reading Rainbow (in which she guest starred and appeared on camera in "Brush" and "The Piggy in the Puddle"). The screenplay was written by Ruth Ebelstein, with assistance from One Eighty One Productions, where the special was filmed. The characters were sculpted by Mark Califra (who would later work alongside Eric Fogel on Celebrity Deathmatch, and serve as animator for A Little Curious on HBO Family), Isabelle DuFour (who designed some of the Muppets for the 1988 interactive VHS tape for the View-Master Interactive Vision game system Muppet Studios Presents: You're the Director, then would later become a "Muppet builder" for The Muppet Christmas Carol, Muppets from Space, and Allegra's Window on Nickelodeon), Rupert Nesbitt, Jennifer Oxley (who would later work as animator for Little Bill on Nick Jr.), and Demitra Vassiliadis ( who would later work alongside Cote Zellers on KaBlam!, mainly for "Harold's Glow-in-the-Dark Brand Butter", Gullah, Gullah Island on Nick, Jr., and I Spy on HBO Family, and provided her voice talent for Mutilator, Hero of the Wasteland, Episode II: Underworld)

=== Music ===
The music was produced by Shavat Ben Israel at Royal Kingdom Productions, and recorded at Village Studio by Kfar Saba. Post-production took place at Avi Yaffe Studio, while video post-production took place at Videosonic. The lyrics for the songs were written by Shavat Ben Israel (who also served as the guitarist, keyboardist, and drummer) and Elesheva Eshet Eliel (who also served as the keyboardist).

=== Voice cast ===
Daniel Diker (who trained as an actor at Stella Adler Conservatory in New York City in the mid-1980s, and played an F.B.I. Agent in the 1991 American direct-to-video action filmDelta Force 3: The Killing Game), provided both the speaking voice and singing voice of Gerbert Goblin, M.G. Pumpkin, and the speaking voice of I.M. Ruthless. Elesheva Eshet Eliel provided both the speaking voice and singing voice of Esmeralda the Witch. Chaya Golinkin provided both the speaking voice and singing voice of Abby, while Daniel W. Rickin provided the voice of Scott.

== Soundtrack ==
1. "Haunted House Rock 1" - Performed by Rivka Harel
2. "M.G. Pumpkin's Rap" - Performed by Daniel Diker
3. "Junk Food Reggae" - Written and performed by Shavat Ben Israel
4. "You Can Be What You Wanna Be" - Performed by Chaya Golinkin
5. "Baddest Witch" - Written and performed by Elesheva Eshet Eliel
6. "Haunted House Rock 2" (a.k.a. "We're Gonna Shake and Break in The Haunted House Tonight") - Written and performed by Shavat Ben Israel
7. "I'm A Goblin" - Performed by Daniel Diker
8. "You Can Be What You Wanna Be" (End Credits version)- Written and performed by Elesheva Eshet Eliel

Additional background vocals were provided by Adayah, Amoniel, Ben Kesed, Matsiel, Neorah, Shadiyah, and Zehora.

== Release and broadcast history ==
=== Broadcast ===
Follow That Goblin! premiered on CBS on Sunday, August 16, 1992, the same day it was released on VHS. Follow that Goblin! aired on BBC One London on Saturday, December 26, 1992, at 07:00 P.M., and on BBC Two London on Sunday, April 18, 1999, at 08:55 P.M.

=== Home media ===
Follow That Goblin! was released on VHS by Family Home Entertainment on August 16, 1992, and again on Tuesday, September 14, 1993

=== VHS release dates ===
- August 16, 1992
- September 14, 1993

== Reception ==
Felix Vasquez Jr., the film critic and publisher of Cinema Crazed, wrote, "This extremely rare Halloween special may deliver varying results depending on how lenient you are willing to be in production quality. The claymation here isn't exactly top notch and the producers of "Follow That Goblin!" fill the gap with ancient computer animation that pops up every now and then. Deep down though, it's a unique Halloween movie with a fun premise that deserves to be seen by folks that love this kind of entertainment".

Rare Halloween Videos posted, "This is a wonderful children's video! It looks like it was made by the same people who did the Penny cartoon and much of the claymation on Pee Wee's Playhouse. Simple, crude, and cheaply done, but extremely entertaining. This video is also full of valuable lessons for children. It teaches children to share, help your fellow neighbor, be kind to everyone, and many more lessons. It expresses these lessons through songs that the whole family will enjoy."

Michael P., one of the critics of CinaFilm reviewed it as "One of the greatest claymation Halloween musical movies involving chasing a goblin through a haunted house I've ever seen in my life".

== Legacy ==
After Follow That Goblin! was released, Scopus Films would go on to produce the spin-off/crossover sequel Follow That Bunny!, a 1993 Easter special, in which Gerbert Goblin helps Clarice rescue the Spring Egg from I.M. Ruthless, who returns as an evil ice cream tycoon.

Both Follow That Goblin! and Follow That Bunny! are referenced and listed in both Bowker's Directory of Videocassettes for Children 1999, and Video Source Book 39th Edition.
