= Dan Diker =

Jewish activist

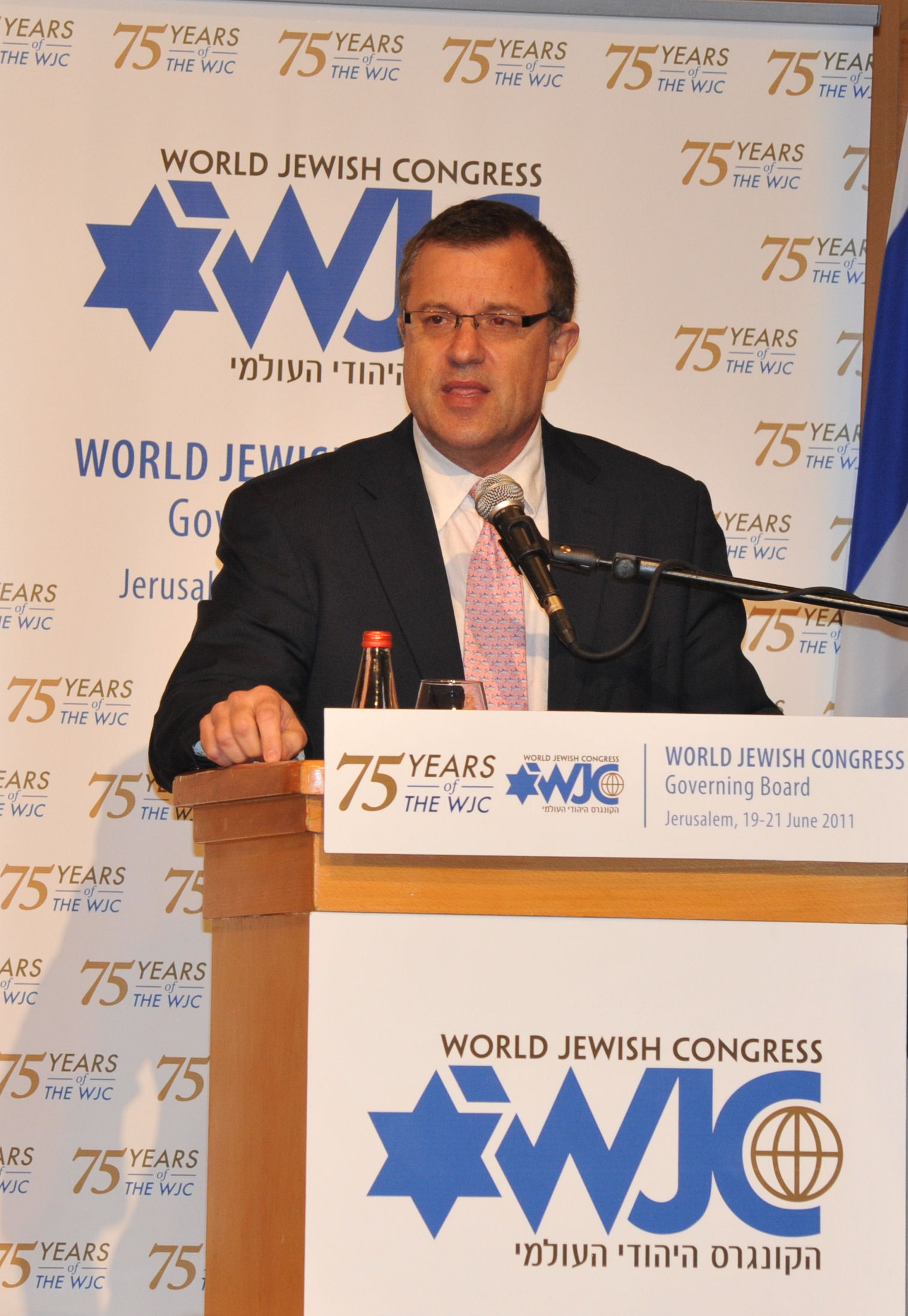
Dan Diker addressing the World Jewish Congress Governing Board meeting in Jerusalem, June 2011

Daniel Diker is the president of the Jerusalem Center for Security and Foreign Affairs, a public diplomacy and research institute in Jerusalem.

== Biography ==
Dan Diker was born in New York. Diker earned a BA cum laude from Harvard University and pursued his MBA at the Harvard Graduate School of Business before receiving an MA in government, counter-terrorism and homeland security studies, summa cum laude, from Reichman University in Israel. His PhD dissertation on the Palestinian National Movement and the West was under the supervision of Professor Christian Kaunert, Department of Security Studies at the University of South Wales, Cardiff, UK.

In the mid-1980s Diker trained as an actor at Stella Adler Conservatory in New York City, and landed several small roles in Delta Force 3: The Killing Game. In the 1992 direct-to-video claymation musical Halloween special Follow That Goblin!, he provided the voice of Gerbert Goblin, M.G. Pumpkin, and I.M. Ruthless.

== Marketing and public service career ==
From 1984 to 1987, Diker worked on Wall Street, first as a marketing professional at Drexel Burnham Lambert, and then as an advisor to the co-chairman on investment banking at Shearson Lehman Brothers.

Diker served as the WJC's director for Strategic Affairs and as WJC Middle East adviser on policy and diplomacy. He succeeded Michael Schneider, who served as the organization's secretary general since 2007.

From 2006 to 2010, he served as director of the Institute for Contemporary Affairs at the Jerusalem Center for Security and Foreign Affairs, headed by Dore Gold, Israel's former Ambassador to the United Nations and former Director General, Israel Ministry of Foreign Affairs. At JCPA, Diker has worked as a foreign policy analyst since 2002. Before his appointment as president of the Jerusalem Center for Security and Foreign Affairs in 2023, Diker was a Fellow and senior project director there, where he headed the Program to Counter Political Warfare and BDS.

Diker was secretary general of the World Jewish Congress (WJC), an umbrella group representing Jewish communities and organizations in nearly 100 countries. Diker began his term as Secretary General designate in December 2010, and was formally elected WJC secretary general on 20 June 2011 by the WJC Governing Board in Jerusalem, Israel. In December 2012, the London-based Jewish Chronicle newspaper reported that Diker had announced his resignation effective January 2013, with the WJC's relocation of its main office to NYC. According to the article, WJC President Ronald S. Lauder praised Diker's "enthusiasm and dynamism" and said that his "love of Israel and the Jewish people is second to none..."

Diker also served as an adjunct fellow of the Hudson Institute in Washington and currently serves as a Research Fellow at the International Institute for Counter-Terrorism at the IDC Herziliya and a foreign policy fellow at the Jerusalem Center for Public Affairs. Diker has authored and edited numerous policy books on the global BDS movement for the JCPA including: Israelophobia and the West (2020), "BDS Unmasked: Radical Roots, Extremist Ends"(2016), "Students for Justice in Palestine, Unmasked" (2017) and "Defeating Denormalization: Shared Palestinian and Israeli Perspectives on a New Path to Peace" (2018).

== Media career ==
Diker was the executive producer of a private online radio station named Voice of Israel (no connection to the official Kol Israel/"Voice of Israel"), which operated between 2014 and 2015. He served as national security Analyst and host of a weekly radio program dealing with issues of national security in Israel and around the world. He also founded and hosted Counter Terrorism Today on IDC International Radio.

Diker has appeared as a commentator and analyst on Israeli and Middle Eastern affairs on CNN, Russia Today, BBC, ABC News, Fox News, and Al Jazeera news channels and as a Middle East Affairs commentator for Israel's IBA English News. His articles have appeared in the New York Sun, The Jerusalem Post, Makor Rishon, as well as the academic journals Middle East Quarterly and Azure.
