= Voice of Israel =

Internet radio station (2014–2015)

Voice of Israel was a Jerusalem-based private global broadcast network staffed by media professionals with a Zionist and often religious orientation, who saw their mission in pro-Israel advocacy (hasbara) and combating the global pro-Palestinian Boycott, Divestment and Sanctions movement, by addressing the wider Jewish diaspora. Between 2014 and 2015 it streamed English-language digital news and talk radio about Israel. Voice of Israel began broadcasting in July 2014 and was closed down due to lack of money in August 2015. It was located in the JVP Media Quarter in Jerusalem.

== Orientation ==
The station had a national Zionist orientation, the self-declared goal being to "reveal the real Israel" as a "Jewish state with great sensitivity to other cultures and peoples" and "fight [its] delegitimization".

The self-professed mission was to 'Bring Israel Closer' to millions of people around the world:

- To repair the disconnect between Israel and the diaspora;
- To educate and inform the world on all issues Israel, including politics, defense, religion and culture by providing world-class news, analysis and opinion and feature stories, about Israel, from Israel.

== Notable guests ==
Notable guests included:

- Prime Minister Benjamin Netanyahu
- Tzipi Livni – Opposition Leader
- Isaac Herzog – Opposition Leader
- Baruch Marzel – Israeli far-right activist
- A. B. Yehoshua - novelist
- Michael Oren – former Israeli ambassador to the US
- Jon Medved – CEO of OurCrowd
- Yosef Abramowitz – solar pioneer, CEO of Energia
- Ben Carson – US presidential candidate
- Brigitte Gabriel – political activist
- Rudy Giuliani – former New York mayor
- Mike Huckabee – presidential candidate
- Avi Dichter – former head of Shin Bet and minister of internal security
- Moshe Arens – former defense minister and ambassador to US
- Tuvia Tenenbom – author of Catch the Jews!,
- Natan Sharansky – Jewish Agency chairman
- Malcolm Hoenlein – executive vice chairman of the Conference of Presidents of Major American Jewish Organizations
- Rabbi Shmuley Boteach – author, columnist, TV host, and lecturer
- Mike Pence – Governor of Indiana
- Jerry Silverman – Jewish Federations of North America (JFNA), CEO
- Philip Levine – mayor of Miami Beach, Florida
- Dr. Billy Wilson – president of Oral Roberts University.

Talk show hosts from abroad also teamed up with Voice of Israel to broadcast their programs such as Ethan Bearman and Joe Piscopo.

== Staff ==
The station was led by Bureau Chief Daniel Seaman, CEO Glen Ladau, and Executive Producer Dan Diker.

Show hosts include: Mottle Wolfe, Daniel Seaman, Josh Hasten, Judy Lash Balint, Eve Harow, Daniela Traub, Glen Ladau, Molly Livingstone, former Member of Knesset Dov Lipman, Melanie Phillips, Gil Hoffman, Ari Abramowitz, Jeremy Gimpel, Dan Diker, Yishai Fleisher, Simcha Gluck

The news team included Mordechai Twersky, Raoul Wootliff and Ernie Singer.
