= Amnon Lord =

Israeli journalist (born 1952)

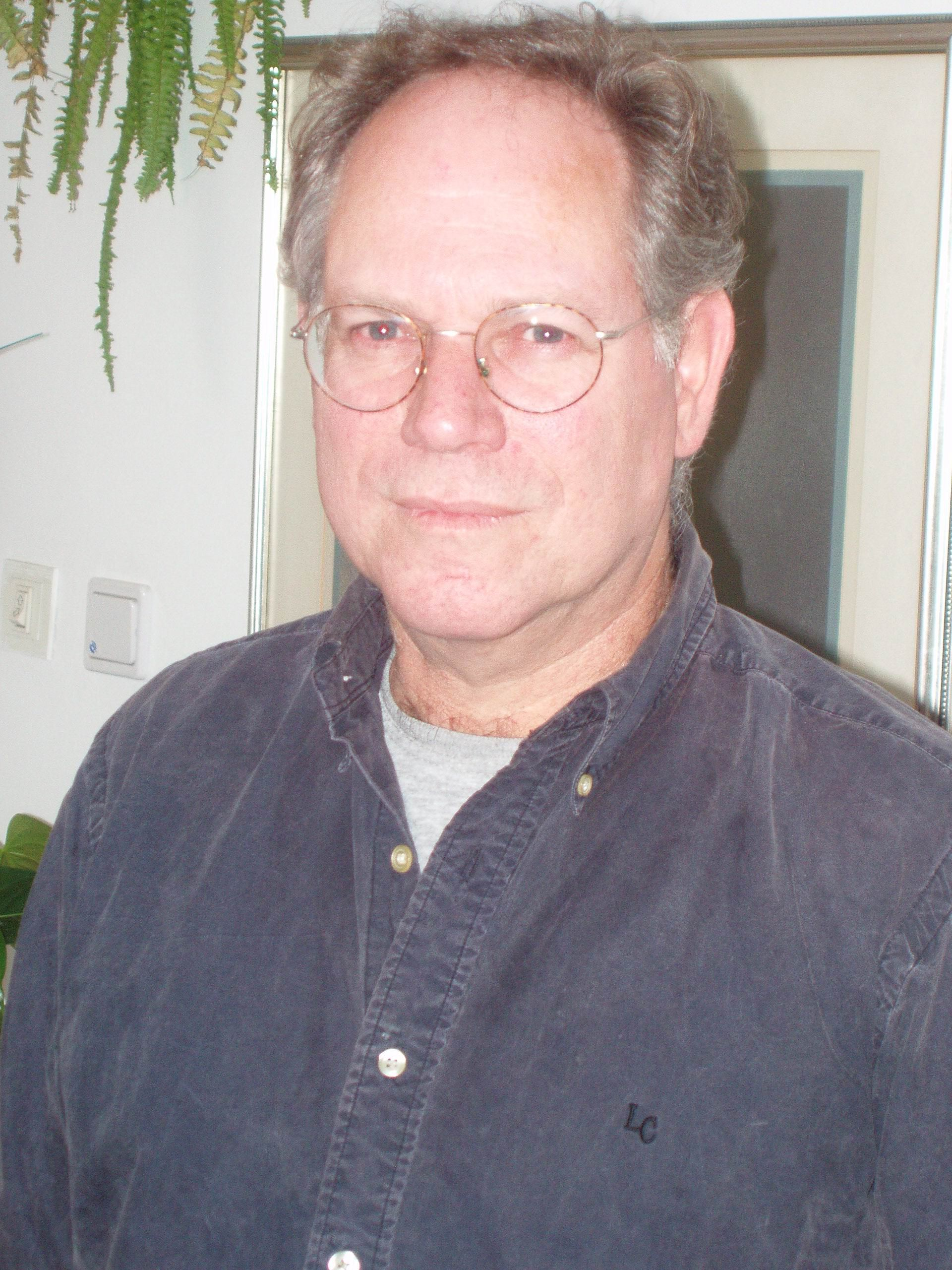
Amnon Lord

Amnon Lord (Hebrew: אמנון לורד; born 1952, Kibbutz Ein Dor, Israel), is an Israeli journalist with the daily newspaper Makor Rishon.

Lord's articles and essays about media, film, and politics have been published in The Jerusalem Post, Mida, Azure, Nativ, and Achshav. Lord wrote and anchored a TV series about the beginnings of Israeli cinema. He is the author of The Israeli Left: From Socialism to Nihilism (2003), a political and historical analysis of the Israeli Left from a personal perspective.
