= Jerusalem Center for Security and Foreign Affairs =

Israeli political think tank

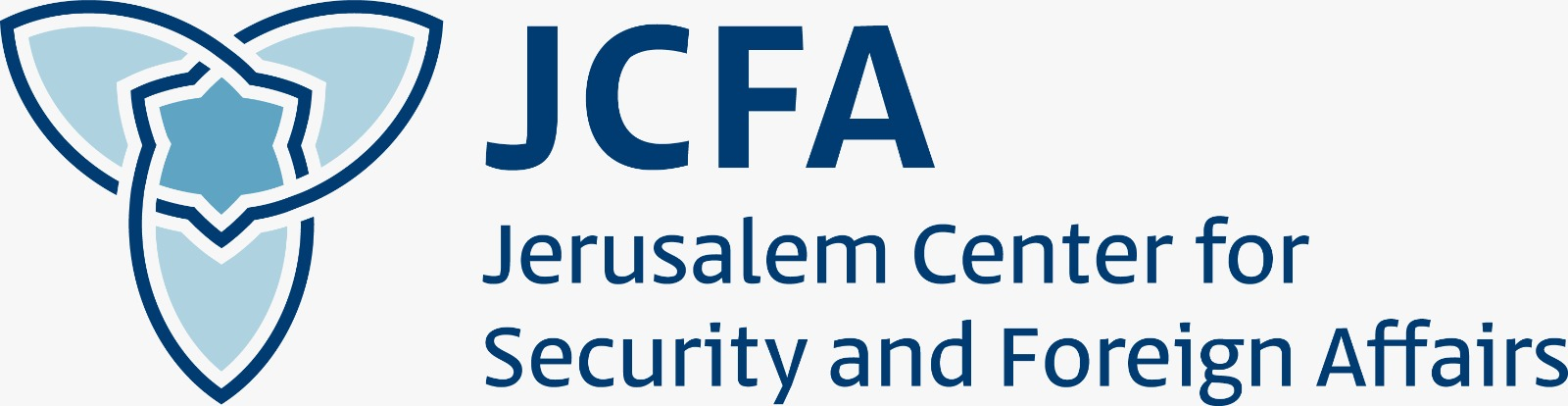

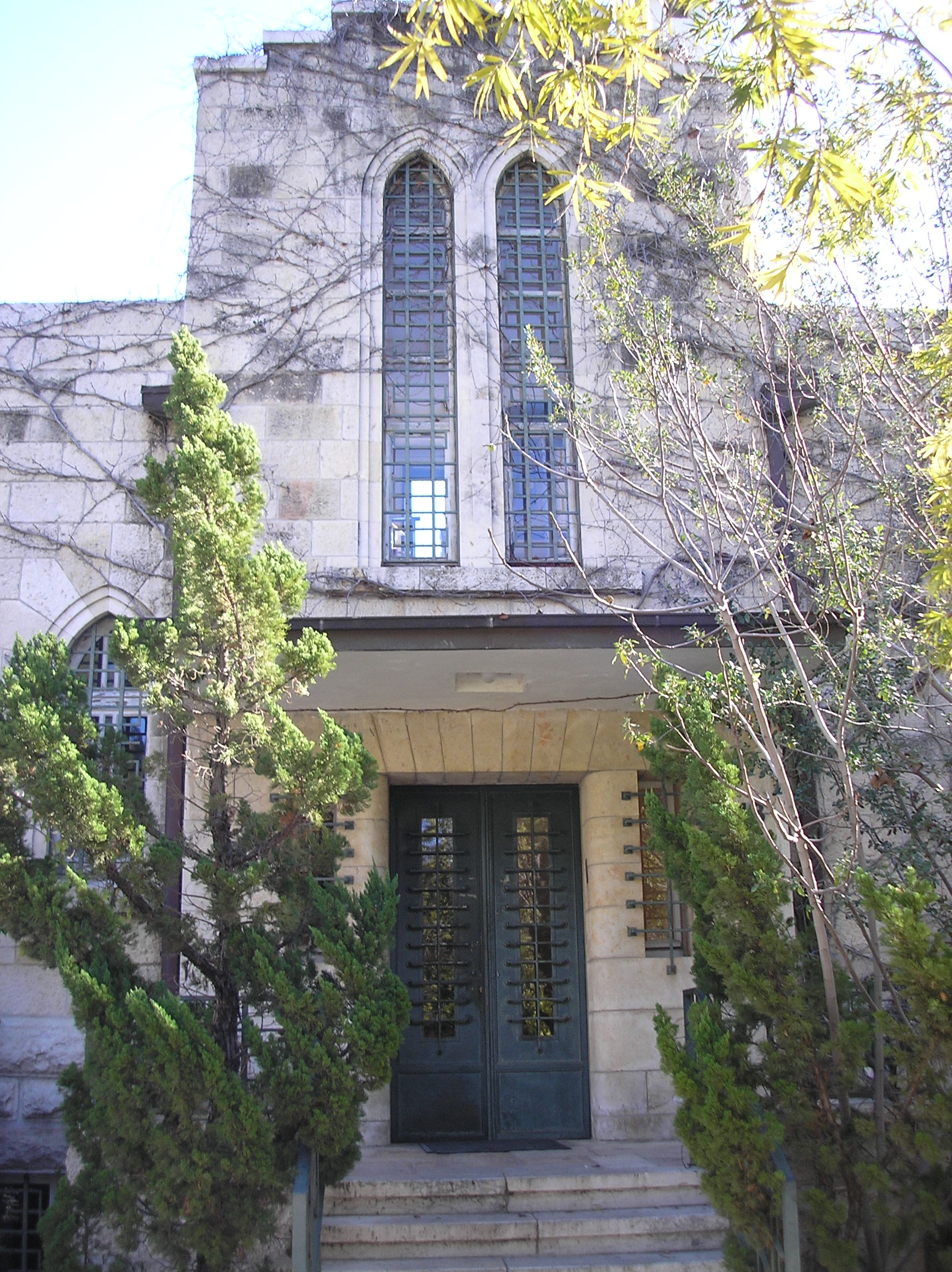
- JCFA building in Katamon
- Founded: 1976
- Founder: Daniel J. Elazar
- Type: Public Policy Research Institute
- Location: Beit Milken, 13 Tel Hai St. Jerusalem
- Key people: Dr. Dan Diker (President, 2023 - present)
- Website: jcfa.org

The Jerusalem Center for Security and Foreign Affairs (JCFA), formerly the Jerusalem Center for Public Affairs (JCPA), is an independent Israeli, non-profit research institute that has operated since 1976 from Beit Milken in the Greek Colony neighborhood of Jerusalem The institute publishes research, develops strategic initiatives, operates multilingual media channels, and promotes a network of cooperation with research institutes and governments worldwide.

The president of the institute is Dr. Dan Diker. The director general is Sagiv Steinberg. The vice president is Aviram Bellaish.

== History ==
The Jerusalem Center was established in 1976 in Jerusalem, initially under the name “Jerusalem Center for Public Affairs,” by a group of scholars—led by Professor Daniel Judah Elazar— along with diplomats and senior figures from the defense establishment, who sought to create an independent body to examine Israel’s foreign policy, security, and public diplomacy challenges from a long-term perspective.

In 1999, the Center relocated its headquarters to Beit Milken (13 Tel Hai Street, corner of Rachel Imenu Street, Katamon neighborhood, Jerusalem). That same year, Dr. Dore Gold, who had previously served as Israel's ambassador to the United Nations, was appointed President of the Center. He led the Center for more than two decades.

In 2023, Dr. Dan Diker was appointed President of the Center.

Beginning in 2023, the Center expanded its activities into the fields of public diplomacy and countering hostile narratives in the international arena. New departments were established for multilingual media, legal research and analysis, and coverage of the Arab and Islamic world.

In 2024, the institute changed its name to JCFA – the Jerusalem Center for Security and Foreign Affairs, reflecting the expansion of its activities in the security and regional spheres.

=== Building ===
Elazar personally raised most of the funds for the operation of the organization and the restoration of an historic building on Tel Hai Street in Jerusalem, named in honor of the Milken family. The building, Beit Milken, served as the Embassy of Uruguay from 1957 to 1980, when Uruguay decided to move their embassy to Tel Aviv. In 1989, the 1,200 ton building was moved 16 meters on rails to reach the site it currently occupies.

=== Political orientation ===
According to the JCSFA itself, it is an apolitical organization, with a large number of experts on Arab affairs across the world.

The Forward reported in 2014 that the organization is a conservative think tank headed by Dore Gold, a Netanyahu adviser and former Israeli ambassador to the United Nations. Its financial support is channeled through the Center for Jewish Community Studies in Baltimore, which is also under his leadership. In 2012, a $1 million contribution from Sheldon Adelson accounted for nearly 66% of the think tank’s operating budget.

== Controversy ==
In 2014 Professor Joseph Spoerl published an article for the Jerusalem Center for Public Affairs (as it was then known) offering an academic-style rationale for Prime Minister Netanyahu’s false claim that the Palestinian Mufti of Jerusalem, Haj Amin al-Husseini, played a decisive role in persuading Adolf Hitler to adopt the policy of exterminating European Jews. Closely echoing Netanyahu’s remarks to the World Zionist Congress later in the year, Spoerl argued that Hitler had favored expulsion until Husseini urged mass murder as the "final solution". Although Spoerl draws heavily on works by right-leaning historians that emphasize the Mufti’s connections with the Nazis, he offers no direct historical evidence to support the specific claim (as echoed by Netanyahu) that the Mufti persuaded Hitler to pursue the annihilation of the Jews. The article, "Palestinians, Arabs and the Holocaust", appeared while the Center was still directed by Netanyahu confidant Dore Gold, who led the think tank for 15 years before becoming director general of Israel’s Foreign Ministry.

== Activities ==
According to its own leadership, the Center engages with countries in the Arab world with whom Israel does not have formal relations.

Institute for Contemporary Affairs

The Jerusalem Center founded the Institute for Contemporary Affairs (ICA) jointly with the Wechsler Family Foundation. The current director of the ICA is Ambassador Alan Baker. Through this outlet, the JCPA publishes Jerusalem Issue Briefs and Jerusalem Viewpoints. They also publish the twice-yearly Strategic Perspectives, special reports presenting studies on Israeli security and diplomacy topics by the Contributing Editors board of the ICA.

Institute for Global Jewish Affairs

In 2008, the JCFA founded the Institute for Global Jewish Affairs in response to growing international anti-Semitism. It was directed by Manfred Gerstenfeld until 2021.

The institute helps direct the "Post-Holocaust and Anti-Semitism Project" and its associated monthly publication "Post-Holocaust and Anti-Semitism," both of which attend to global anti-Semitism.

NGO Monitor

In 2002 the organisation founded the NGO Monitor ("Non-governmental Organization Monitor"), a Jerusalem-based NGO, which analyzes the output of international NGOs from a pro-Israel perspective. The Monitor became independent from the JCFA in 2007.

Conferences

On March 24, 2014, the Jerusalem Center held a conference entitled "Europe and Israel: A New Paradigm." The conference focused on the complicated relationship between Israel and Europe, including topics such as economics and the BDS movement, security and anti-Semitism. The conference was well attended and received a significant amount of press, including articles in The Times of Israel, The Jerusalem Post, J-Wire, Yedioth Ahronoth, and CBN News.

Publications

The JCFA publishes the Jewish Political Studies Review, a biannual journal that describes itself as "dedicated to the study of Jewish political institutions and behavior, Jewish political thought, and Jewish public affairs".

== See also ==
- Conservatism in Israel
- AIPAC
