= Yehuda Lancry =

Israeli diplomat (born 1947)

- יהודה לנקרי
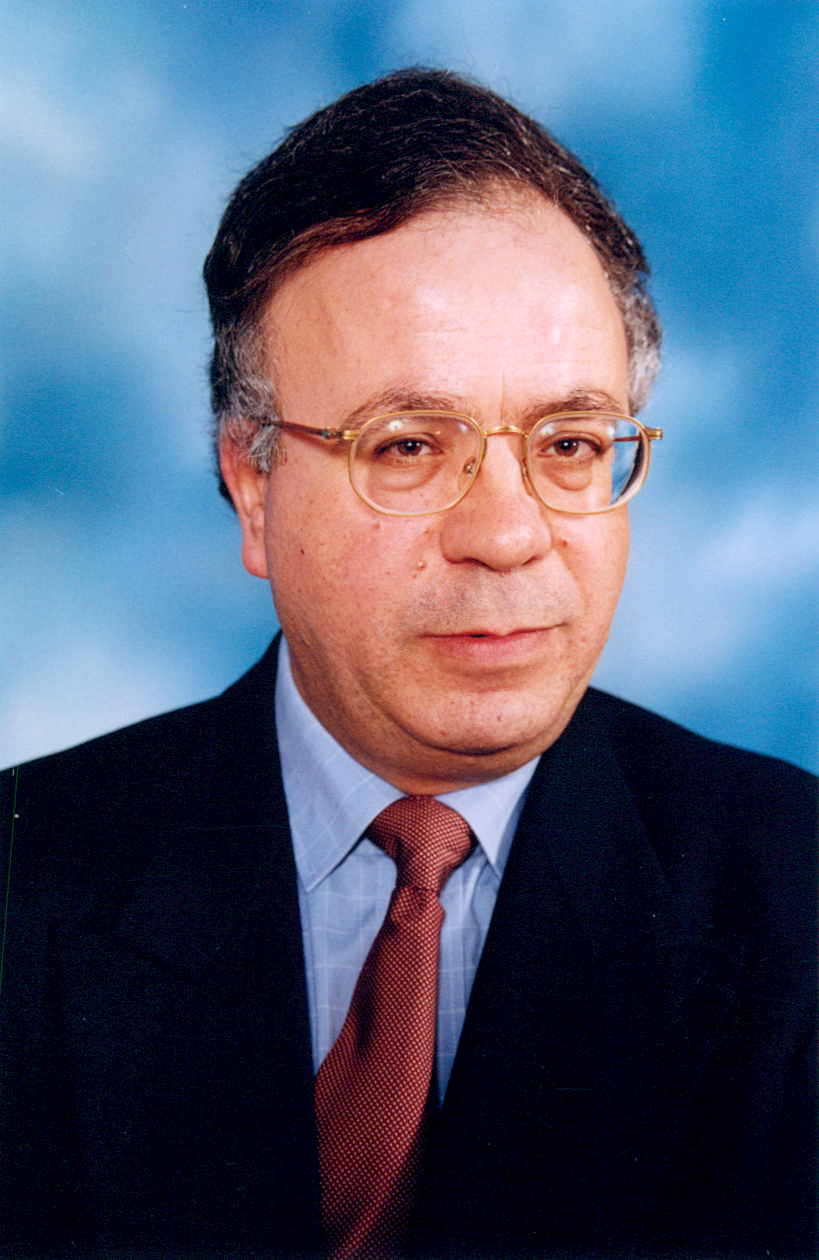

Israel Ambassador to France
- In office 1992–1995

12th Israel Ambassador to the United Nations
- In office 1999–2002
- Preceded by: Dore Gold
- Succeeded by: Dan Gillerman

Personal details
- Born: 25 September 1947 (age 79) Boujad, Morocco
- Party: Likud/Gesher
- Profession: Politician

Yehuda Lancry (Hebrew: יהודה לנקרי, Arabic: يهودا لانكري; born 25 September 1947) is a Moroccan-born former Israeli politician and ambassador to France and the United Nations.

Born in Boujad, Morocco, Lancry studied at an Alliance high school in Casablanca. He immigrated to Israel in 1965 and earned a PhD in French literature from the University of Haifa and the University of Nice Sophia Antipolis. Between 1983 and 1992 he served as head of the local council of Shlomi, and from 1991 until 1992 was chairman of Second Israeli Broadcasting Authority. He was appointed Israel's ambassador to France in 1992, serving until 1995. In 1996, Lancry was elected to the Knesset on the Likud-Gesher list and served as a Deputy Speaker of the Knesset and chairman of the Ethics committee.

He lost his seat in the 1999 elections, but was appointed ambassador to the United Nations that year, serving until 2002. That same year, on 10 April 2002, Lancry's niece, Noa Shlomo, was killed in the suicide bombing of Egged bus #960 en route from Haifa to Jerusalem.
