= Daniel Seaman =

Israeli media professional and civil servant

Daniel "Danny" Seaman (Hebrew: דניאל "דני" סימן; born 1961) is an Israeli media professional and former civil servant, mainly active in the fields of foreign service and public diplomacy.

Seaman worked in the Israeli civil service for 31 years (1983-2014). Between 2000-2010, Seaman served as the director of the Israeli Government Press Office (GPO), part of the Prime Minister's Office in Jerusalem responsible for the foreign media contingent in Israel. His last public position was Deputy Director General for Information at the Ministry of Public Diplomacy and Diaspora Affairs, where his outspoken views were often seen as controversial. In August 2013, Seaman was suspended from his government position as Director of Interactive Media because of comments he made in a private Facebook posting about Japanese commemorating the bombing of Hiroshima and Nagasaki and Palestinians commemorating the Nakba.

Since 2014, Seaman has worked as Bureau Chief for Voice of Israel (2014-16; see below), English language editor at MiDA, an online conservative Israeli current affairs and opinion magazine (2016-18), Director of the Israel office of the Middle East Forum (2018-19), and Managing Director for Meshilut (2020).

Voice of Israel was a private Israeli English-language news and talk internet radio station that existed from 2014 to 2015. Seaman hosted In The Lions' Den with Daniel Seaman and Daniela Traub interviewing such guests as Dr. Einat Wilf, Zvi Yehezkeli, Ehud Gol, Col. Richard Kemp, Dr. Joy Browne, Bassem Eid and other political and media figures.

== Biography ==
Seaman was born on a US Air Force base in Germany, the son of an American father and an Israeli-born mother. His family moved from the United States to Israel in 1971 and settled in the port city of Ashkelon.

He enlisted in the Israel Defense Forces serving in an elite paratroop unit in 1979 and is a veteran of the 1982 Lebanon War.

Between 1983 and 1989, Seaman he was employed by the Israeli consulate in New York City. While there he completed a BA in political science, with honors, at the City University of New York's Hunter College.

Seaman served as an adviser and spokesperson to the governments of six prime ministers: Yitzhak Shamir, Shimon Peres, Yitzhak Rabin, Benjamin Netanyahu, and Ehud Barak.

Seaman was directly responsible for coordinating the press coverage of several heads of states visits to Israel including US President Bill Clinton, British prime minister Tony Blair, Canadian prime minister Jean Chrétien, Australian prime minister John Howard, Jordan's King Hussein and Chinese president Jiang Zemin. He was a member of the Israeli press delegation to the Aqaba peace talks (see Road map for peace, Red Sea Summit in Aqaba, Jordan, June 4, 2003). Seaman received the Israel Outstanding Civil Service Award in 2000 for coordinating the international press coverage of Pope John Paul II's visit to the Holy Land in March 2000.

Seaman was appointed as acting director of the Government Press Office (GPO) in December 2000 and worked with foreign journalists who covered news events in Israel and the Palestinian territories until 2010. He had worked for the GPO for several years and was the first civil servant promoted to directorship of the GPO after a period of 30 years. During his tenure as GPO director he implemented several measures that improved working conditions for foreign journalists in Israel. This notwithstanding, there were numerous complaints about his treatment of journalists unsympathetic to Israeli policies (see Controversies below).

He took a leave of absence from his post in November 2008 and announced his candidacy in the Likud party primaries for the 18th Knesset, but withdrew his candidacy.

Seaman lectures on Israeli and Middle-Eastern affairs and appeared on dozens of international news media outlets.

== Controversies ==
=== Conflicts with journalists ===
As the director of the GPO, Seaman came under criticism for not issuing journalists with Israeli press cards. Additionally, he was accused by one journalist of becoming aggressive, abusive and using foul language against journalists he considered hostile and unfair towards Israel. Such journalists included Israeli mainstream media employees such as Atta Awisat, a veteran staff photographer at Yedioth Ahronoth, then the largest newspaper in Israel, allegedly due to clearance issues with the security agencies.

Seaman did not deny using this type of policy towards blatantly anti-Israeli media outlets:

I can make journalists' lives more difficult. There are certain guidelines that allow me to do that. Such as with the case of [Swedish newspaper] Aftonbladet, and their despicable anti-Semitic [...] report on the IDF [purportedly] abducting Palestinians and using their body organs. We didn't prevent Aftonbladet from working here. We just took our time. To this day, the correspondents from Aftonbladet do not get a press card immediately. We can take up to 90 days and we can take longer...

Another journalist who became the target of Seaman's contempt was Jörg Bremer, a 15-year veteran of the press corps in Jerusalem, who worked as the correspondent of the right-liberal German Frankfurter Allgemeine Zeitung newspaper. In his case, he was denied not the renewal of his press card, but the extension of his residence visa. For calling this measure a political way of keeping unwanted journalist at bay and for asking for the German government's support, Bremer was described by Seaman in a newspaper interview as "an idiot," "a piece of shit" and "a miserable liar." Bremer said in response that "Seaman wants journalists to lick his feet. He gets enjoyment from the situation, and uses his power instead of helping. It is harmful to Israel."

On 11 March 2007, Haaretz reported that the Israeli Civil Service Commission was investigating foreign journalists' accusations that Government Press Office director Daniel Seaman has treated them improperly and enforced the procedures for receiving a press pass in an inequitable manner.

In August 2013, Haaretz accused him of having "gained a reputation for his confrontations with foreign correspondents and for the complaints they lodged against him" and called him "an abusive racist." The article, included selected quotes from Seaman's personal Facebook page. Seaman was admonished by the government, which distanced itself from his views and then suspended him from his position as Director of Interactive Media because of offensive, racist comments.

=== Comments against Japanese nuclear victim commemorations ===
I am sick of the Japanese, 'Human Rights' and 'Peace' groups the world over holding their annual self-righteous commemorations for the Hiroshima and Nagasaki victims. Hiroshima and Nagasaki were the consequence of Japanese aggression. You reap what you sow. Instead, they should be commemorating the estimated 50 million Chinese, Korean, Filipino, Malay, Vietnamese, Cambodian, Indonesian, Burmese and other victims of Japanese imperial aggression and genocide.

The statement, posted on Seaman's personal Facebook page, led to a rebuke from the Japanese government and an official Israeli apology. Editorials in Tablet and Israel National News called Seaman's suspension over the incident "misguided."

=== Anti-Palestinian online postings ===
— The Palestinians' 65-second siren commemorating the Nakba is "not nearly enough time to stop and pause to think about how stupid they are."

— On 26 May 2013, Seaman posted "Is there a diplomatic way of saying 'Go F*** yourself'?" on Facebook in response to conditions for the renewal of peace talks set by Palestinian negotiator Saeb Erekat.

— Similarly, he wondered whether Muslims "stop eating each other" during Ramadan.

== Media and book coverage ==
- Seaman is mentioned extensively in Stephanie Gutmann's book The Other War—Israelis, Palestinians and the Struggle for Media Supremacy(October 2005). Chapter 10, "His Own Private Jihad," is specifically about his efforts to curb Palestinian influence on the media coverage.
- Media, Religion and Conflict by Heather Savigny, states, "Daniel Seaman, the Director of the Israeli Government Press Office, commenting on the international television coverage of the 2006 Israel-Hezbollah war, was quoted by CNN as saying: "There was too much exposure, it had an effect on our ability to achieve strategic goals, so that's one of the lessons we learned from the war in Lebanon."
- Intifada: Palestine and Israel - The Long Day of Rage by David Pratt quotes Seaman as saying, Israel would not "...behave just to be liked by the Europeans or lay down and play dead. We are going to defend ourselves,' he continued. "Seaman pulled no punches and called it as he saw it, berating whatever country or organization he felt 'appeased Palestinian terrorism.' He even included the United Nations Palestinian relief agency UNWRA, accusing it of turning a blind eye to weapons stored in its food warehouses. "So I'm asking you, what are these organizations doing when they criticise Israel? All Israel is doing is defending itself..."
- Seaman currently writes for Mida on the Arab-Israeli conflict and media bias.
- Seaman has a regular column in Jewish News Syndicate.
- "Danny Seaman's farewell voyage". Upon conclusion of his term as GPO director he gave an extensive interview to the editor of The Jerusalem Post, which was published on November 5, 2011.
- "Is an abusive racist the best Israeli PR can produce?" Haaretz, August 13, 2013.
- "Bullying Israeli Government Flack Sparks Diplomatic Row—Among Other Concerns," about Seaman denying press cards to journalists and using foul language towards them. The Daily Beast, February 21, 2013.
- "Netanyahu's social media director suspended," on Seaman's suspension, blogging faux-pas and future plans. The Jerusalem Post, August 16, 2013. .

== Published articles ==
- "Palestinian industry of lies: Media manipulation has become strategic Arab weapon against Israel" - Ynetnews, May 29, 2008 .
- "Opposing the Digital Pogrom" - Responding to the foreign media's claim they are offended by their negative portrayal in a Ministry for Public Diplomacy's campaign. The Jerusalem Post, March 4, 2010
