= Gabriela Shalev =

Israeli jurist and ambassador

- גבריאלה שלו
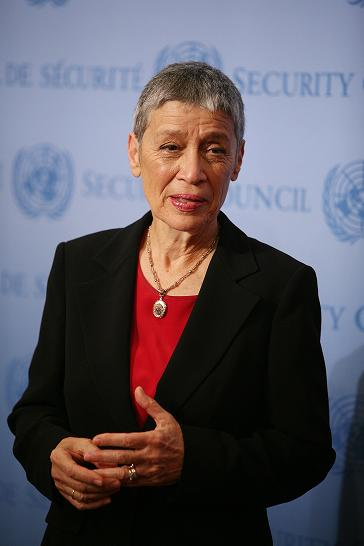

14th Permanent Representative of Israel to the United Nations
- In office 2008–2010
- Preceded by: Dan Gillerman
- Succeeded by: Meron Reuben

Personal details
- Born: August 19, 1941 (age 85) Tel Aviv, British Mandate of Palestine
- Relations: Shaul Shalev (first husband; killed in Yom Kippur War)
- Children: Narkiss and Eran
- Education: Hebrew University of Jerusalem (LL.B. summa cum laude; LL.M. summa cum laude (1969); Doctor Jur. summa cum laude (1973))
- Occupation: Ambassador and jurist

Gabriela Shalev (Hebrew: גבריאלה שלו; born August 19, 1941) is an Israeli jurist. She was the Israeli ambassador to the United Nations from 2008 to 2010.

== Early life ==
Shalev was born in Tel Aviv in 1941. Her mother's parents were murdered in Auschwitz, and her father's parents had to leave a comfortable life in Berlin and immigrate to the Yishuv.

In 1959 she entered the Israel Defense Forces, and she was honorably discharged in 1961 as a lieutenant. In 1966, she received an LL.B. (summa cum laude) from the Hebrew University of Jerusalem. As a student, she helped support her family. She received an LL.M. (summa cum laude) in 1969, and Doctor Jur. (summa cum laude) in 1973, all from the Hebrew University. Her mentor was Gad Tadeschi.

Her husband, Shaul Shalev, was killed near the Suez Canal in the 1973 Yom Kippur War, and she raised her two children alone. She was a visiting scholar (post-doctoral research) at Harvard Law School from 1975 to 1976.

Shalev worked as a clerk at the Supreme Court of Israel from 1964 to 1966, and at the legal department of the Jewish Agency in 1967. She was admitted to the Israeli Bar in 1968. She was Chief Legal Editor of the Judgments of the Supreme Court of Israel from 1968 to 1980 (and again in 1998), and Chief Legal Advisor for the reform in national health services in 1991. She was a legal advisor, arbitrator, and expert, in Israel and abroad, on litigation matters concerning national and international transactions.

== Academic career ==
Shalev became a teacher and member of the Hebrew University Faculty of Law in 1964. She became a full professor of contract law at the Hebrew University in 1986.

She was a visiting professor at Temple Law School, Philadelphia, in 1975, Boston College School of Law in 1976 and 1981, Tulane Law School in 1988, University of Glasgow School of Law in 1991, the University of Toronto in 1993, Leuven University in 1996, and University of Fribourg in 1998.

Shalev was director of the Harry Sacher Institute for Legislative Research and Comparative Law at the Hebrew University Faculty of Law from 1981 to 1984, and a member of the Standard Contracts Tribunal, starting 1983. She was a member of the Codification in Civil Law Committee from 1984 to 2006, and a legal editor of the Hebrew Encyclopedia's new edition in 1984. She was an advisor on the status of women at the Hebrew University from 1988 to 1990, and became a member of the Committee for Legal Terminology at the Academy of the Hebrew Language in Israel in 1990. She was chairperson of the academic nomination committee of the Hebrew University from 1991 to 1994, and appointed chairperson of the Fund for Promotion of Law at the Israeli Ministry of Justice from 1991 to 2000. She was a member of A Statutory Committee for recognition of law schools from 1991 to 1995.

Shalev was an academic advisor of the College of Insurance from 1993 to 1998, and chairperson of the Israeli Academic Committee at the University of Manchester from 1995 to 2002. She was a member of the Academic Committee at the Open University from 2001 to 2004. She became the Academic President (Rector) of the Ono Academic College in 2002.

Shalev is regarded as a leading expert in Israel in the fields of contract law and procurement contracts, for which she has provided legal advice and crafted legal opinions, both domestically and abroad. She has written nine books and more than 100 articles in Hebrew and in English, mostly within contract law. Her publications include: Law of Contract (2nd ed., 1995, Hebrew), a treatise on Israeli Contract Law; Contract Law, Israel, a monograph forming part of the International Encyclopedia of Law (Kluwer, 1995); The Law of Government Procurement (1999, Hebrew), Public Procurement Contracts in Israel (1997), Public Procurement Law Review 185. Her books are used in law schools and law offices in Israel. Her most recent books are Contract Law – General Part, Towards Codification of the Civil Law (2005), which is an updated version of her previous works, and Contract Law — Remedies for Breach (2009).

She won the Sussman's Prize in Law in 1989, became The first incumbent of the Hebrew University's Lawrence D. Biele Chair in Contract Law in 1990, and won the Zeltner's Prize in Law in 1991. She won the Israel Bar Association prize in 2003.

== Board memberships ==
Shalev board memberships include:

- Maariv (newspaper publisher) in 1991
- Israel Democracy Institute since 1991
- Bank Hapoalim (where she served as chair of the audit committee) from 1990 to 1996
- Van Leer Jerusalem Institute as trustee since 1995
- Israel Electric Company (chair of audit committee) from 1995 to 2004
- Hadassah Medical Organization from 1996 to 2000
- Israel Fund for Peace (established by Yitzhak Rabin and Shimon Peres) from 1996 to 2004 (chairing the audit committee)
- First International Bank of Israel (FIBI) Holdings from 1998 to 2002
- Koor Industries in 1999
- Yad Yitzhak Ben Zvi (chairing the public committee) since 2000
- Osem Investments since 2001
- Teva Pharmaceutical Industries Ltd since 2003
- Delek Group Ltd. since 2006.

== Ambassador to the United Nations ==
On June 24, 2008, Shalev was nominated by Israeli Prime Minister Ehud Olmert and Foreign Minister Tzipi Livni as Israel's new ambassador to the United Nations, replacing Dan Gillerman. Livni's associates said: "The UN is an arena that requires other skills in addition to diplomatic know-how. The fact that she is a woman, and a jurist respected throughout the world, with a great deal of public experience, makes her the best candidate." Livni was criticized for the pick, but responded, "It was important to me to appoint a woman to represent Israel in such an important place.... Professor Shalev is internationally respected; she has fulfilled many public positions in Israel".

On September 8, she presented her diplomatic credentials to UN Secretary-General Ban Ki-moon, and became the first woman to serve as Israel's ambassador to the UN. She said that: "as a woman, a professor and above all as a proud Israeli, I am happy for the opportunity given me to contribute to the state in the complex international arena of the United Nations".

Shalev was Israel's Ambassador to the UN until October 2010. She is now president of Ono Academic College.
