= Jeremy Gimpel =

American-born Israeli politician (born 1979)

- ג'רמי גימפל
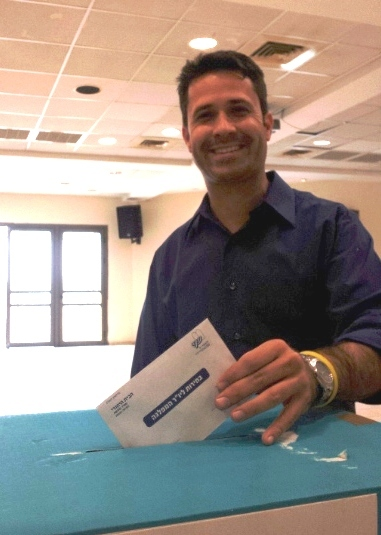
- Born: c. 1979; Atlanta, Georgia
- Occupations: Educator, Radio, TV presenter, politician, Deputy Director of World Mizrachi Movement

Jeremy Gimpel (Hebrew: ג'רמי גימפל; born 1979) is an educator, politician, and presenter of "Israel Inspired" podcast. He is also the Deputy Director of the World Mizrachi Movement.

== Political career ==
In 2013, Gimpel ran in the Israeli legislative election as the 14th member on the ticket of The Jewish Home. The party eventually won 12 seats, and Gimpel missed out on being in the Knesset by 2 seats. After this, in October 2013, Gimpel was appointed as Deputy Director of the World Mizrachi Movement.

== Television and radio career ==
In 2008, Jeremy Gimpel, along with Ari Abramowitz, launched Tuesday Night in Jerusalem, a TV show broadcast out of Israel for viewers in America. The show's aim is to "project a universal Biblical message fused with Jewish wisdom, spirituality, music and comedy broadcast from Jerusalem." Between 2014-2015, he presented a daily show on the Internet-based Voice of Israel radio. In the beginning of 2015, again together with Ari Abramowitz, he launched the Land of Israel Network, a podcast radio station from Jerusalem featuring English language Zionist radio shows.

== Personal life ==
Gimpel was born in Atlanta, Georgia. He lives in EBay Hanachal with his wife Tehila, a Cleveland-born lawyer, and their six children. Gimpel is a vegetarian.

== See also ==
- The Jewish Home
- 2013 Israeli legislative election
