= Dan Gillerman =

Israeli diplomat (born 1944)

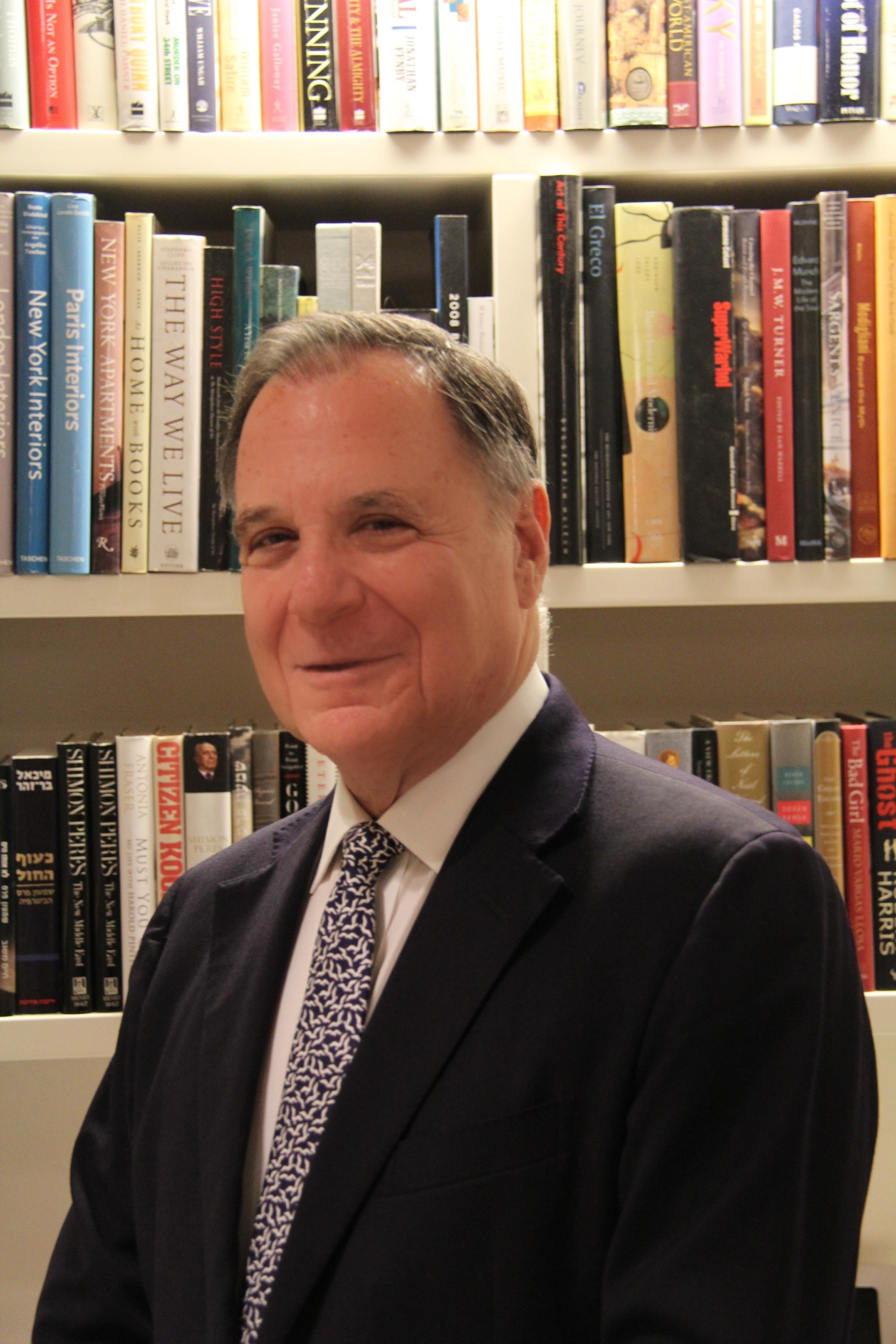

13th Israel Ambassador to the United Nations
- In office 2002–2008
- Preceded by: Yehuda Lancry
- Succeeded by: Gabriela Shalev

Personal details
- Born: 1944 (age 81–82) Tel Aviv, Mandatory Palestine
- Spouse: Janice Gillerman
- Children: 2

Dan Gillerman (Hebrew: דן גילרמן, born 1944 in Tel Aviv) was Israel's 13th Permanent Representative to the United Nations. He was appointed in July 2002 and assumed his post on January 1, 2003, serving through 2008.

== Early life and education ==
Gillerman was born in 1944 in British run Mandatory Palestine. He was educated at Whittinghame College, a Jewish boarding school in Brighton, England, and studied politics, economics and law at Tel Aviv University and the Hebrew University of Jerusalem.

== Career ==
Gillerman served as the CEO of several Israeli companies, Chairman of the Federation of Israeli Chambers of Commerce, member of the board of the First International Bank of Israel and Director of Bank Leumi and the Bank of Israel. He also served on the Prime Minister's National Economic and Social Council, the President's Committee of the Coordinating Council of Israel's Economic Organizations, as Chairman of the Israel-British Business Council, and as member of the executive board of the International Chamber of Commerce of the World Business Organization.

Gillerman has played a prominent role in helping steer Israel towards economic liberalization and a free market economy. He is actively engaged in the economic aspects of the peace process and has engaged Palestinian and other Arab leaders in an attempt to further economic cooperation within the region.

On June 14, 2005, he was elected to the position of Vice-President of the 60th UN General Assembly. The last Israeli to hold this position was UN envoy Abba Eban in 1952. Israel's candidacy was put forward by the United Nations Western Europe and Others Group (WEOG). In this position, Gillerman played a central role during the initial negotiation stages of the 2006 Israel-Lebanon conflict.

On April 24, 2008, Gillerman referred to former US President Jimmy Carter as a bigot for his meeting in Syria with Hamas leader Khaled Meshaal.

Since 2008, when he ceased to be Permanent Representative to the United Nations, he has been chairman and CEO of Gillerman Global, a global strategic consulting firm.

Since 2013, Gillerman has been an Israel based senior adviser to investment management company Blackstone Inc., and in 2021 when a new Israel office was established became chairman of Blackstone Israel.

In response to the October 7 attacks, Gillerman seemed to refer to the Palestinian people as "horrible, inhuman animals" in a televised interview with Sky News. He said:

I am very puzzled by the constant concern which the world is showing for the Palestinian people, and is actually showing for these horrible inhuman animals who have done the worst atrocities that this century has seen, and the worst atrocities that the Jews have suffered since the holocaust.

== Private life ==
Gillerman first met his British wife, Janice, while at school in Brighton. They have two children.

== See also ==
- Israel and the United Nations
