= Mida (website) =

Israeli online magazine

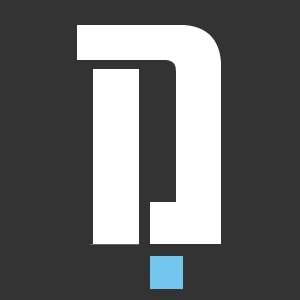
- Website type: Online magazine
- Available in: Hebrew, English
- Creator: Ran Baratz
- Editor: Oded Levin
- Website: mida.org.il
- Launched: 2012; 14 years ago
- Current status: Online

Mida (Hebrew: מידה) is an Israeli current affairs and opinion online magazine self-identifying with classical and conservative liberalism, and the national-liberal Right, targeting a secular and right-wing readership in both the political and economic sense of the term, comparable to the US Republican Party of 2013, with a "realist position" on security issues.

== History and profile ==
Mida was launched by Ran Baratz, a former media advisor for Benjamin Netanyahu, and El Haprat, a nonprofit organization financed by the New York-based Tikvah Fund, chaired by Roger Hertog.

In 2017, the Nrg.co.il website posted the findings of Akiva Bigman, at that point reporting both under the logo of Israel Hayom and Mida, in the Umm al-Hiran incident, which lead to the death of a Bedouin teacher and a policeman.

== Contributors ==
- Yehuda Harel
- Amnon Lord
- Erel Segal
- Daniel Seaman

== See also ==
- List of online magazines
- Media of Israel
