= Emily Frances =

American journalist

Emily Frances is a former news entertainment anchor for WPIX in New York City. Currently, she is hosting the show "TRENDING" on the International Israeli channel, i24 News.

== Early life ==
Frances was born in Malibu, California. She lived in Ecuador and France as part of a student exchange program while in high school. Frances studied at the University of Pennsylvania where she majored in communications and minored in marketing. During summer breaks, she interned in the news department of KABC-TV. She spent her junior year of college abroad in Spain, and while living in Madrid, worked at the local television station Canal Plus.

== Career ==
After graduating from the University of Pennsylvania with a degree in communications and a minor in marketing from the Wharton School of Business, she joined the staff at CNN in Atlanta as a production assistant, and covered the Republican National Convention.

Frances spent almost two years at CNN before moving back to Los Angeles to join Univision's KMEX-TV, a Spanish-language TV station, an assignment editor and producer. At age 23, she won an Associated Press Award for producing a five-part series on immigration and the Mexico–United States border for KMEX-TV. She was also nominated for an Emmy Award for this series. After leaving Univision, she joined Extra—The Entertainment Magazine as a producer, where she helped to launch the syndicated program. The following year she joined A Current Affair, a syndicated news magazine, where she produced feature stories and a daily entertainment news segment for anchor Nancy O'Dell. She began to work for KVBC-TV, the NBC station in Las Vegas, where she was hired as an on-air reporter.

Later that year she moved to Tucson, Arizona, as a lead reporter at KOLD-TV the CBS station. In 1999, she moved to New York to join WCBS-TV Channel 2. She left WCBS-TV in 2000 to join WPIX as a newsanchor, via "The WB 11 Morning News" program, as a reporter. In 2002, she was named the Entertainment Anchor for the WPIX Morning News. Each February, she hosts a national, live two-hour Oscar red carpet show, "Live From the Academy Awards" which won a Telly Award in 2004. In 2004, she won an Emmy for Best On-Camera Achievement: Entertainment Reporting. That same year, she was nominated for an Emmy Award for Entertainment Producing and Hosting. In 2005, "The WB 11 Morning News" team was awarded an Emmy for Best Morning News Program. She continued anchoring for WPIX, into the current The CW era (2006 -), until she left for i24 News in 2013.

She has appeared in feature films and television. She has starred as a reporter in Maid in Manhattan. She played a reporter in two other films, Searching for Bobby D and The Narrow Gate. She appeared as herself (an entertainment reporter) on the July 25, 2006 episode of the now defunct soap opera All My Children.

== List of awards ==
- 2005 Emmy Award, Best Morning News Program, The WB11 Morning News
- 2004 Emmy Award, Best On-Camera Achievement: Entertainment Reporting
- 2004 Telly Awards, "Live from the Academy Awards"
- 1994 Los Angeles Associated Press Broadcasters Award, Best Investigative Mini Documentary (KMEX-TV)
