= Eric Trager =

American political advisor

Eric Trager is an American academic, commentator, and political advisor on the Muslim Brotherhood, Egypt, and the Middle East. He was Esther K. Wagner Fellow at The Washington Institute for Near East Policy from 2011 to 2017. He left this position to take on various roles as a Professional Staff Member for Republican Party Senators

== Political appointments ==
Professional Staff Member:

November 2017-December 2018: Senate Foreign Relations Committee, Bob Corker, Republican Party Senator for Tennessee
December 2018-January 2023: Senate Armed Services Committee, Jim Inhofe, Republican Party Senator for Oklahoma
January 2023-January 2025: Senate Armed Services Committee, Roger Wicker, Republican Party Senator for Mississippi
January 2025-May 2025: US National Security Council Senior Director, Middle East and North Africa appointed by President Donald Trump

== Publications ==
- (2016) Arab Fall: How the Muslim Brotherhood Won and Lost Egypt in 891 Days, Georgetown University Press
