= Government Press Office (Israel) =

Israeli government agency

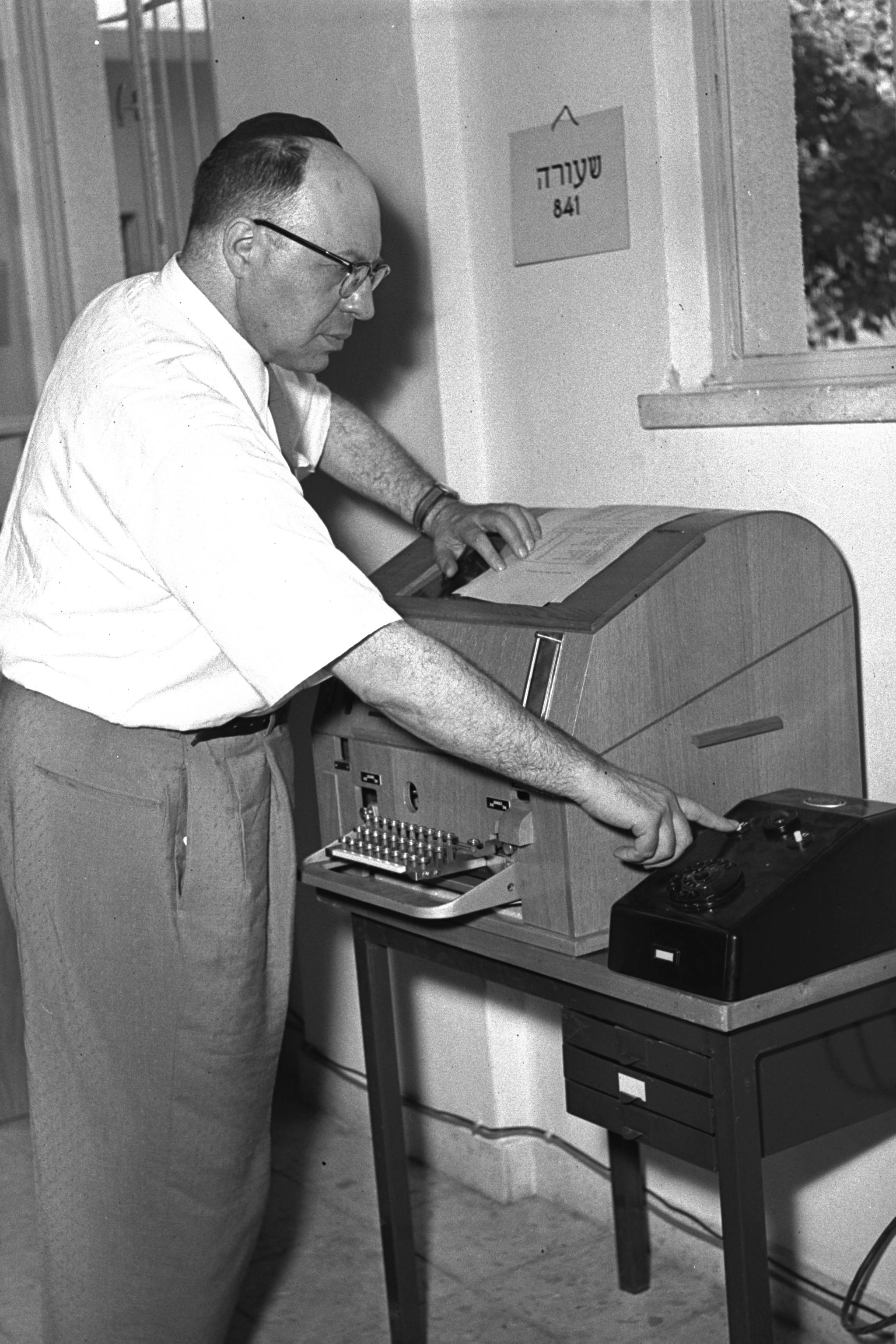
Postal Minister Yosef Burg dedicating the first Telex machine in the Government Press Office, August 1956

The Government Press Office (abbreviated: GPO; Hebrew: לשכת העיתונות הממשלתית, Lishkat Ha-Itonut Ha-Memshaltit; abbreviated: לע"ם, La'am) is responsible for coordination between the Government of Israel and journalists and media personnel working in the country.

== History ==
Prior to the founding of the State of Israel, Jewish Agency leadership accepted the need to explain the Zionist idea to the global public. In 1924, Gershon Agronsky was appointed head of public relations in the Political Division of the Jewish Agency. . This agency was named the Press Office. Along with the World Zionist Organization administration and the Jewish National Fund, it published a weekly bulletin entitled Information from Israel in Hebrew, English, German, French, and Spanish.

In 1934, the news division of the Jewish Agency was established, headed by Joseph Gravitzky. Later, the news division became independent under the direction of Yeshayahu Klinov. The news division and the press office were both managed by Moshe Sharett. The news division supplied items to newspapers in Israel and Jewish newspapers around the world.

In 1951, Moshe Pearlman was appointed the first director of the Israel Government Press Office. Other agencies involved in Israeli public diplomacy were Keren Hayesod, the Jewish National Fund, and the United Jewish Appeal.

== Activities ==
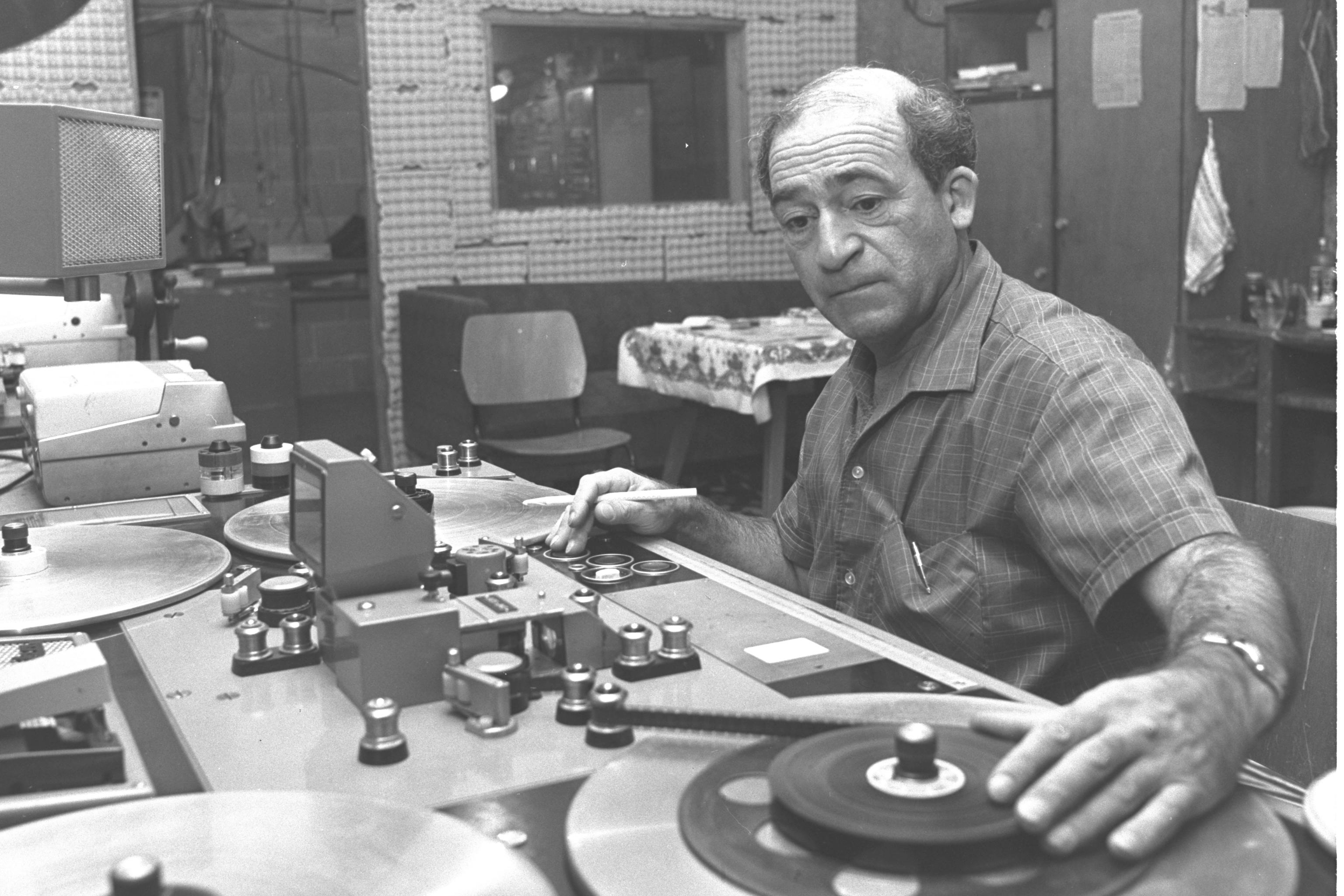
Gideon Ucko producing educational films for the Government Press Office (1966).

GPO works to facilitate media coverage of important events in Israel, including state visits and those of other foreign VIPs. It issues press cards for journalists, as well as cards for other media personnel (broadcast technicians, documentary film producers, media assistants, etc.) It also briefs media representatives. It is responsible for opening communication centers for important events such as Papal and head of state visits.

The GPO is equipped to operate in Hebrew, Arabic, English, and Russian. A separate department supports the economic press. The GPO forwards a daily summary of articles about Israel in the English-language overseas press to various government offices and is responsible for translating and distributing press releases from the Prime Minister's Office, the President's Office, and other government agencies.

It organizes foreign press tours. GPO initiates communication workshops — lessons in appearance in front of an audience, appearance in front of the camera, etc..—for various VIPs.

The GPO Photography Department is responsible for photographing the president and prime minister at official events and press conferences in Israel and abroad. The Photography Department operates the National Photo Collection, which includes tens of thousands of photographs of important events. The National Photo Collection was opened in 2011 for free use by the public.

In 2013, a new media department was established. This department is responsible for the GPO website and social media presence. GPO provides video streaming services for on-line press conferences.

GPO established the Government Spokespersons Forum, which formulated a code of ethics for government spokespersons. In addition, a Foreign Media Correspondents Forum was established.

== Goals ==
- Strengthening the bond between the foreign press and the Government of Israel.
- Expanding the photographed documentation service of government symbols.
- Providing accessibility for its activities

== Press credentials ==
GPO is responsible for issuing press credentials. GPO's press card is issued to Israeli and foreign press according to written criteria and allows access to government events that are open only to media personnel. Every request is submitted for a security review. In 2012 GPO began issuing press cards for bloggers.

== GPO directors ==
Year	Name
1951-1954	Moshe Pearlman
1954-1976	David Landor
1976-1977	Dr. Miron Medzini
1977-1983	Zeev Hefetz
1983-1986	Mordechai Dolinsky
1986-1988	Israel Peleg
1988-1990	Yoram Ettinger-Eitan
1990-1993	Dr. Josef Olmert
1993-1996	Uri Dromi
1996-2000	Moshe Fogel
2000-2010	Daniel Seaman
2010-2011	Oren Helman
2012-2026	Nitzan Chen

== See also ==
- Public diplomacy of Israel
- Israel Government Advertising Agency
