= Permanent Representative of Israel to the United Nations =

List of ambassadors from Israel to the United Nations

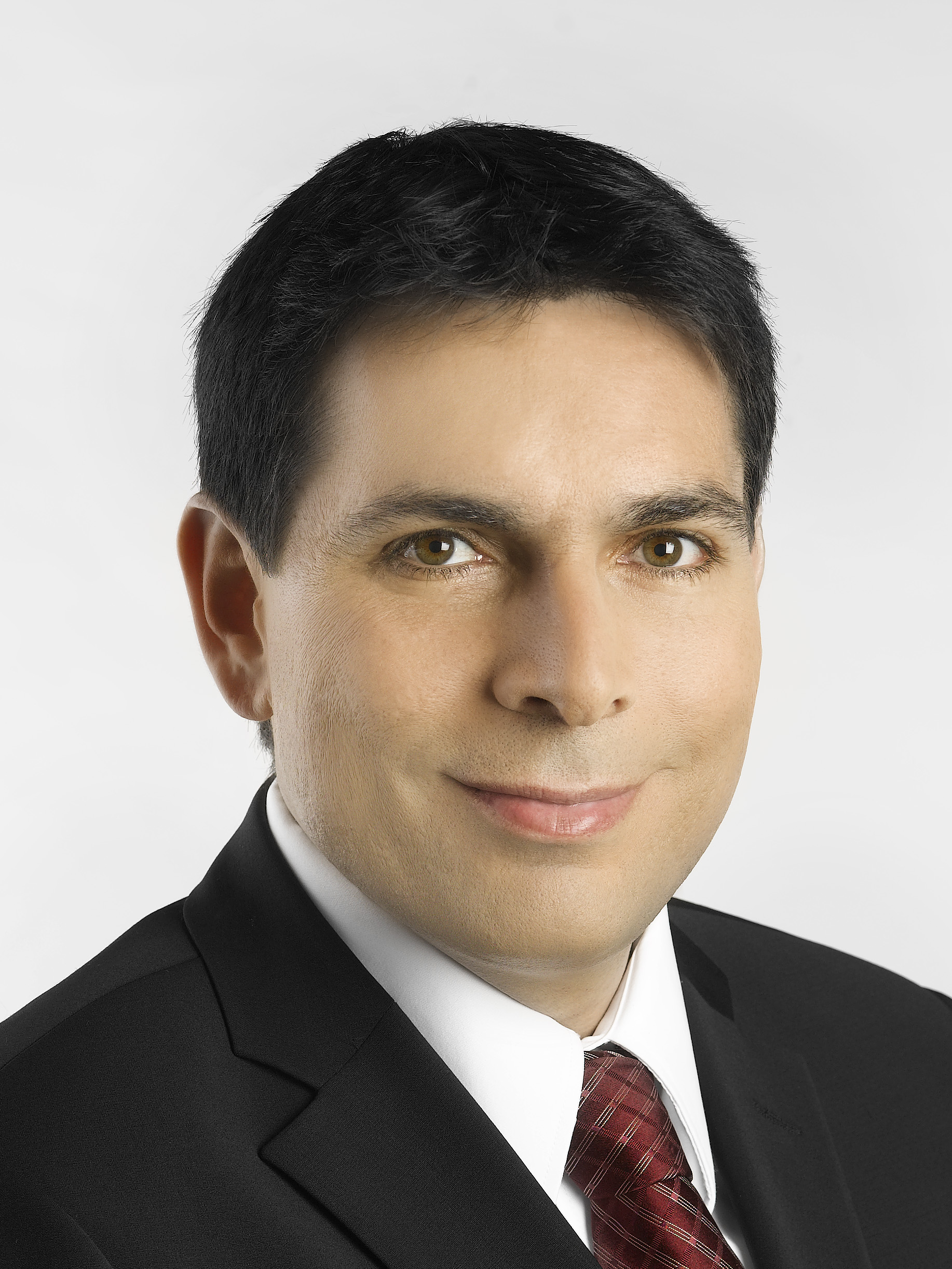
- Incumbent; Danny Danon since August 19, 2024
- Style: Diplomatic mission
- Inaugural holder: Abba Eban
- Formation: 1949

The permanent representative of Israel to the United Nations is the de facto Israeli ambassador to the United Nations, with the rank and status of ambassador extraordinary and plenipotentiary.

The permanent mission of Israel to the United Nations is led by Ambassador Danny Danon, who replaced Ron Prosor in 2015, as permanent representative of Israel to the United Nations and former director general of the Ministry of Foreign Affairs. Danon presented his credentials to UN Deputy Secretary-General Jan Eliasson on October 19, 2015. The deputy ambassador is Jonathan Miller.

On May 11, 2020, Benjamin Netanyahu announced that Gilad Erdan, minister of internal security, would be Israel’s new ambassador to the UN and in an unusual move, would also become the ambassador to the United States after the 2020 elections.

The permanent mission of Israel to the United Nations has nearly 30 staff members, including diplomats from the Ministry of Foreign Affairs and civil servants.

== Office holders ==
#	Name	Image	Years served	U.N. Secretary(ies)-General	Prime Minister(s) of Israel
1	Abba Eban (Note: Also served concurrently as Israel's ambassador to the United States from 1950–1959)		1949–1959	Trygve Lie, Dag Hammarskjöld	David Ben-Gurion, Moshe Sharett
2	Michael Comay		1960–1967	U Thant	David Ben-Gurion, Levi Eshkol
3	Gideon Rafael		1967–1968	U Thant	Levi Eshkol
4	Yosef Tekoah		1968–1975	U Thant, Kurt Waldheim	Levi Eshkol, Golda Meir, Yitzhak Rabin
5	Chaim Herzog		1975–1978	Kurt Waldheim	Yitzhak Rabin, Menahem Begin
6	Yehuda Blum		1978–1984	Kurt Waldheim, Javier Pérez de Cuéllar	Menahem Begin, Yitzhak Shamir
7	Benjamin Netanyahu		1984–1988	Javier Pérez de Cuéllar	Yitzhak Shamir, Shimon Peres, Yitzhak Shamir
8	Yohanan Bein		1988–1990	Javier Pérez de Cuéllar	Yitzhak Shamir
9	Yoram Aridor		1990–1992	Javier Pérez de Cuéllar, Boutros Boutros-Ghali	Yitzhak Shamir
10	Gad Yaacobi		1992–1996	Boutros Boutros-Ghali	Yitzhak Rabin, Shimon Peres
11	Dore Gold		1996–1999	Boutros Boutros-Ghali, Kofi Annan	Benjamin Netanyahu
12	Yehuda Lancry		1999–2002	Kofi Annan	Ehud Barak, Ariel Sharon
13	Dan Gillerman		2002–2008	Kofi Annan, Ban Ki-moon	Ariel Sharon, Ehud Olmert
14	Gabriela Shalev		2008–2010	Ban Ki-moon	Ehud Olmert, Benjamin Netanyahu
15	Meron Reuben		2010–2011	Ban Ki-moon	Benjamin Netanyahu
16	Ron Prosor		2011–2015	Ban Ki-moon	Benjamin Netanyahu
17	Danny Danon		2015–2020	Ban Ki-moon, António Guterres	Benjamin Netanyahu
18	Gilad Erdan (Note: Also served concurrently as Israel's ambassador to the United States for a period of about one year at the beginning of his term)		2020–2024	António Guterres	Benjamin Netanyahu, Naftali Bennett, Yair Lapid
19	Danny Danon		2024–	António Guterres	Benjamin Netanyahu

== See also ==
- Israel and the United Nations
- List of diplomatic missions of Israel
- United Nations Security Council
- United Nations General Assembly
- UN Watch
