= Dore Gold =

American-Israeli political scientist and diplomat (1953–2025)

- דורי גולד
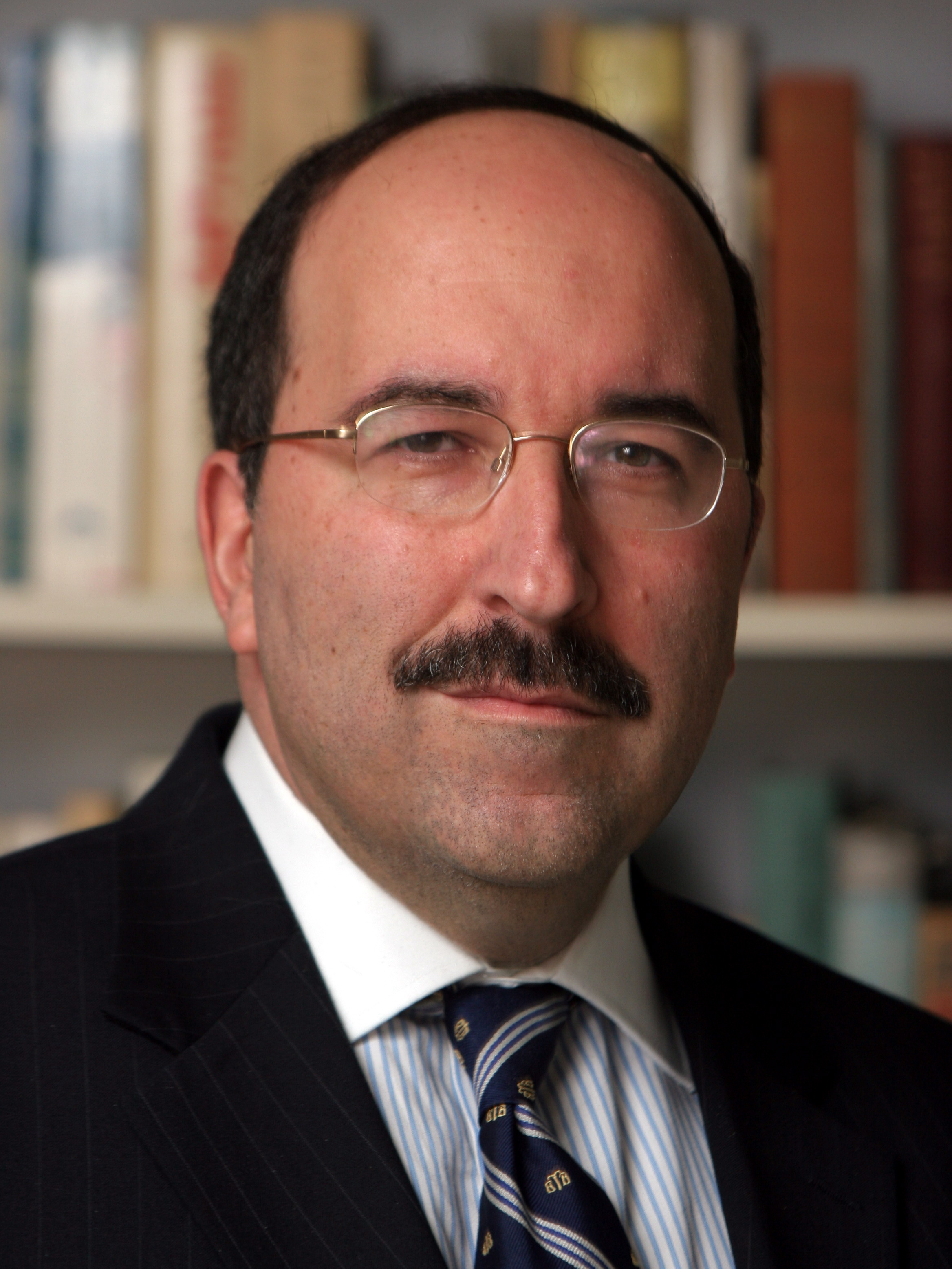

11th Permanent Representative of Israel to the United Nations
- In office 1997–1999
- Preceded by: Gad Yaacobi
- Succeeded by: Yehuda Lancry

Personal details
- Born: 25 July 1953 Hartford, Connecticut, U.S.
- Died: 3 March 2025 (aged 71)
- Education: Columbia University (BA, MA, PhD)

Isidore "Dore" Gold (Hebrew: איזידור "דורי" גולד; 25 July 1953 – 3 March 2025) was an American-born Israeli political scientist and diplomat.

After making aliyah in 1980, Gold worked at the research institutes Moshe Dayan Center for Near East Studies and the Jaffee Centre for Strategic Studies, before serving as Prime Minister Benjamin Netanyahu's Foreign Policy Advisor from 1996 to 1997. He then was appointed Permanent Representative of Israel to the United Nations, and served in the post until 1999.

Gold was the president of think tank Jerusalem Center for Public Affairs from 2000 to 2022, including an appointment as Director-General of the Israeli Ministry of Foreign Affairs from May 2015 to October 2016.

== Early life ==
Dore Gold was born on 25 July 1953 in Hartford, Connecticut, United States, and was raised in a Conservative Jewish home. His primary education was spent at the Orthodox Yeshiva of Hartford. In the 1970s, Gold attended Northfield Mount Hermon School (Class of 1971) and then enrolled in Columbia University. There Gold earned BA and MA degrees in Political Science, and then a PhD in Political Science and Middle Eastern Studies.

Gold studied literary Arabic and specialized in international law, and his doctoral dissertation was about Saudi Arabia. This research later formed the foundation for his 2003 New York Times bestseller, Hatred's Kingdom: How Saudi Arabia Supports the New Global Terrorism. In the book, Gold argued that Saudi Arabia was actively funding terrorism by supporting the enemies of the U.S. and attacking its allies.

Gold made aliyah to Israel in 1980.

== Career ==
=== Academic career ===
Gold's career began in 1985 when he served as senior research associate at Tel Aviv University's Moshe Dayan Center for Near East Studies. Later, he was appointed Director of the U.S. Foreign and Defense Policy Project at the Jaffee Centre for Strategic Studies at Tel Aviv University and held this position from 1985 to 1996.

=== Peace process ===
In 1991, Gold was an advisor to the Israeli delegation at the Madrid Peace Conference.

=== Advisor to Benjamin Netanyahu ===
Gold was a longtime confidant to Israeli Prime Minister Benjamin Netanyahu. From June 1996 to June 1997 he served as Foreign Policy Adviser to Israeli Prime Minister Benjamin Netanyahu.

According to Barry Rubin and Judith Colp Rubin, Gold and Netanyahu advisor Yitzhak Molcho were the first envoys of the newly elected Likud government to meet with Yasser Arafat in the Gaza Strip on 27 June 1996. Dennis Ross relates to the "Abu-Mazen–Dore Gold" talks that ensued afterwards as a result of which the Palestinians closed down offices in East Jerusalem that Israel had argued were a violation of the Oslo Accords.

Also in 1996, Gold secured a commitment from Secretary of State Warren Christopher that the Yitzhak Rabin "deposit" on the future of the Golan Heights did not bind the State of Israel. This effort also included obtaining a new U.S. commitment from the Clinton administration to the September 1975 Gerald Ford letter, in which it was stated that the U.S. would give great weight to Israel remaining on the Golan Heights. This renewed commitment came in a formal letter of assurances to Prime Minister Benjamin Netanyahu on 19 September 1996. Gold was also directly involved in negotiations leading up to the 1997 Hebron Agreement. From 1997 to 1999, Gold served as Israel's ambassador to the United Nations.

Following the appointment of Ron Dermer as Israeli Ambassador to the United States, Gold would once again serve as a foreign policy to Netanyahu in the Prime Minister's Office beginning on 1 January 2014. His purview covered Israel's relations with the U.S. and United Nations, as well as Iran policy. Officially an outside consultant, he retained his position as head of JCPA.

In May 2015, Netanyahu appointed Gold the Director-General of the Israeli Ministry of Foreign Affairs, subject to the cabinet's approval. During his tenure, Gold was Israel's de facto foreign minister, as Netanyahu held the foreign minister portfolio in the government while concurrently serving as prime minister. Gold oversaw several foreign policy breakthroughs, including repairing diplomatic relations with several African countries. On 13 October 2016, Gold resigned from the Director-General's position after 16 months for personal reasons. Gold resigned as head of JCPA to become director-general, and returned to the position after his resignation.

=== Jerusalem Center for Public Affairs ===
From 2000 to 2022, Gold served as president of the non-profit institute, Jerusalem Center for Public Affairs. From 2001 to 2003, Gold served as an adviser to Israeli Prime Minister Ariel Sharon, most notably at the Aqaba summit with President George W. Bush. During this period, Gold regularly appeared on US network television programs on behalf of the Sharon government. In July 2003, Gold testified as an expert before the U.S. Senate Committee on Governmental Affairs on Saudi Arabia's alleged role in providing ideological and financial support for international terrorism.

Beginning in 2006, Gold led an international effort by the Jerusalem Center for Public Affairs to advocate that UN member states take legal measures against President Mahmoud Ahmadinejad of Iran on grounds that he violated the anti-incitement clauses of the 1948 Genocide Convention, with his repeated statements about "wiping Israel off the map." Gold led a delegation to a conference held jointly with the Conference of Presidents of Major American Jewish Organizations at the New York County Bar Association on 14 December 2006. Speakers included former Canadian Justice Minister Irwin Cotler, Prof. Alan Dershowitz of Harvard Law School, and the U.S. ambassador to the UN John Bolton.

Gold led an Israeli delegation to a second conference at the British House of Commons on 25 January 2007 which was chaired by Lord David Trimble and supported by members of the British Labour Party and the Conservative Party. Then-former Israeli Prime Minister Benjamin Netanyahu joined the Israeli team. As a result of this effort, over 60 members of the House of Commons called for the indictment of Ahmadinejad. A third event organized by Gold and the International Association of Genocide Scholars was held on 23 September 2008 in Washington D.C. Speaking at the third conference was Ambassador Richard Holbrooke, former U.S. ambassador to the UN, as well as Salih Mahmoud Osman, a member of the Sudanese Parliament and advocate for human rights in Darfur.

== Personal life, death and legacy ==
Gold was married to Ofra and had two children. He died on 3 March 2025, at the age of 71.

He was considered a trailblazer for olim to serve at the highest levels of the Israeli government.

== Publications ==
=== Books ===
- The Rise of Nuclear Iran: How Tehran Defies the West (Regnery, 2009). ISBN 1-59698-571-2
- The Fight for Jerusalem: Radical Islam, the West, and the Future of the Holy City (ISBN 0786147849 / Publisher: Regnery, Blackstone Audiobooks / Date: Jan 2007)
- Tower of Babble: How the United Nations Has Fueled Global Chaos (Crown Forum, November 2004). ISBN 1-4000-5475-3
- Hatred's Kingdom: How Saudi Arabia Supports the New Global Terrorism (Regnery, 2003). ISBN 0-89526-135-9
- American Military Strategy in the Middle East: The Implications of the US Regional Command Structure (CENTCOM) For Israel (Tel Aviv: Ministry of Defense Publications), 1993.
- Israel as an American Non-NATO Ally: Parameters of Defense and Industrial Cooperation (Boulder: Westview Press), 1992.

=== Selected articles ===
- The Political Battle Over the 'Occupation'. The Weekly Standard. 20 July 2012.
- 'Land Swaps' and the 1967 Lines. The Weekly Standard. 20 June 2011.
- Israel's 1967 Borders Aren't Defensible. The Wall Street Journal. 21 May 2011.
- Countdown to September. Jerusalem Viewpoints. May 2011.
- Foreign Policy April 2011.
- Statement before the Foreign Affairs Committee of the U.S. House of Representatives. 5 April 2011.
- The International Context of the U.S. Veto at the UN Security Council . Makor Rishon. 25 February 2011.
- Israel’s Naval Blockade of Gaza Is Legal, Necessary . Bloomberg. 10 June 2010.
- Iran's Nuclear Aspirations Threaten the World. LA Times. 6 August 2009.
- Israel's Forgotten Rights in Jerusalem. Haaretz. May 2009.
- Did Israel use "Disproportionate Force" in Gaza?. JCPA. 28 December 2008.
- The Dangers of 'Peace' Making: America's Latest Efforts Merely Entrenched al Qaeda in the Gaza Strip. Wall Street Journal. 12 August 2007.
- Saudi Arabia's Dubious Denials of Involvement in International Terrorism. Jerusalem Viewpoints. 1 October 2003.
- Saudi Support for International Terrorism. U.S. Senate Committee on Governmental Affairs. 31 July 2003.
- The Kingdom of Incitement. Wall Street Journal. 14 April 2003.
- Baseless Comparisons: UN Security Council Resolutions on Iraq and Israel (Jerusalem Issue Brief, 24 September 2002).
- Only Buffer Zones Can Protect Israel. The New York Times. 27 February 2002.
