= Nitzan Chen =

Israeli journalist, author and news manager

- ניצן חן
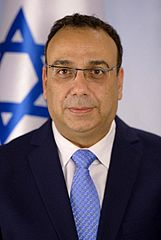
- Chen at the GPO in 2013
- Born: October 4, 1963 (age 63); Jerusalem, Israel
- Education: Hebrew University of Jerusalem; Ono Academic College
- Occupations: Journalist; News director

Nitzan Chen (Hebrew: ניצן חן; born October 4, 1963) is an Israeli journalist, author, and news manager. He served as the Director of the Government Press Office (Israel) and as Chairman of the Israel Broadcasting Authority.

== Early life ==
Nitzan Chen was born on October 4, 1963, in Jerusalem. After serving in the Artillery Corps of the Israeli Defense Forces, he earned a BA in political science from the Hebrew University of Jerusalem and a law degree from Ono Academic College. He was a researcher and biographer for Rabbi Ovadia Yosef, the spiritual leader of the ultra-Orthodox Shas party.

== Career ==
=== Early career ===
Chen began his journalism career in 1987 as a correspondent for the ITIM News Agency. A year later he worked in Britain as an editor for The Jewish Chronicle (UK) and then as editor and presenter for Israel Radio (1989-1991). In 1991, he began his television career at Israel TV, Channel 1 News.

=== Channel 1 ===
Chen started as Israel Television's correspondent for domestic and religious affairs and also covered the Office of the President. From 1992 to 1996, he covered the Jewish settlement movement and protests against the Oslo Accords with the Palestinians. From 1996 to 2006, he was correspondent for the Knesset (parliament); during this time some 3,000 stories were registered in his name including dozens of exposés and investigative reports. After serving as editor of the daily news program Seven Thirty in 1999, he became editor of Mabat, the flagship Evening News program a year later.

From 2005 to 2009, he taught journalism and communications at the Ma'ale School of Television, Film, and the Arts and at Lifshitz College of Education. He was editor and presenter of the current affairs program From Today to Tomorrow and other broadcasts on education, society and religion, including a monthly program on behalf of the Department for Israel's National Heritage.

=== Management in communications ===
Chen was the News Director for Israel Television from 2006 to 2007. In 2008, he served as Chairman of the Cable and Satellite Broadcasting Council and as Chairman of the Israel Broadcast Authority. In this capacity, he sought to protect the Israeli consumer by supervising the high prices charged by Israel's cable TV companies.

In 2012, Chen became Director of the Government Press Office which facilitates the work of the large contingent of local and foreign journalists in Israel. He served in this role until 2026.

In 2026 Chen was appointed Head of the Spokesperson's Division for the Jerusalem Municipality.

== Public activity ==
Chen is on the board of the Israeli Academy of Film and Television and is the Screenwriters Union representative. He has served as Chairman of the Ethics Forum for Children and Youth in Broadcasting and as a Media for the Community volunteer in schools and youth movements.

== Books ==
- Rabbi Ovadia Yosef: The Biography. Nitzan Chen and Anshel Pfeffer (2004)
