= Yitzhak Molcho =

Israeli spy

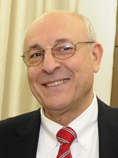
Yitzhak Molcho

Yitzhak Molcho (Hebrew: יצחק מולכו, born c. 1945) is an Israeli lawyer and former chief negotiator in the Israeli negotiating team with the Palestinians on behalf of Israeli Prime Minister, Benjamin Netanyahu.

== Legal career ==
Molcho served as Netanyahu's adviser in his first term as prime minister, and along with another adviser at the time, Dore Gold, became the first representative of Netanyahu's first Government, on 27 June 1996, to convene with Yasser Arafat in Gaza. In 2010, he was appointed to head the Israeli negotiating team, on behalf of the second Netanyahu Government.

Molcho led Israel's representatives at the talks for the Hebron Protocol.

Molcho's law practice specializes in corporate law. Molcho joined the firm in 1970 and married the founding partner's daughter. When the founder died in 1978, Molcho took over as managing partner. He added a cousin of Netanyahu as a partner to the firm and has handled private legal matters of the Netanyahu family.
