= Emily Schrader =

Israeli-American journalist

- אמילי שריידר
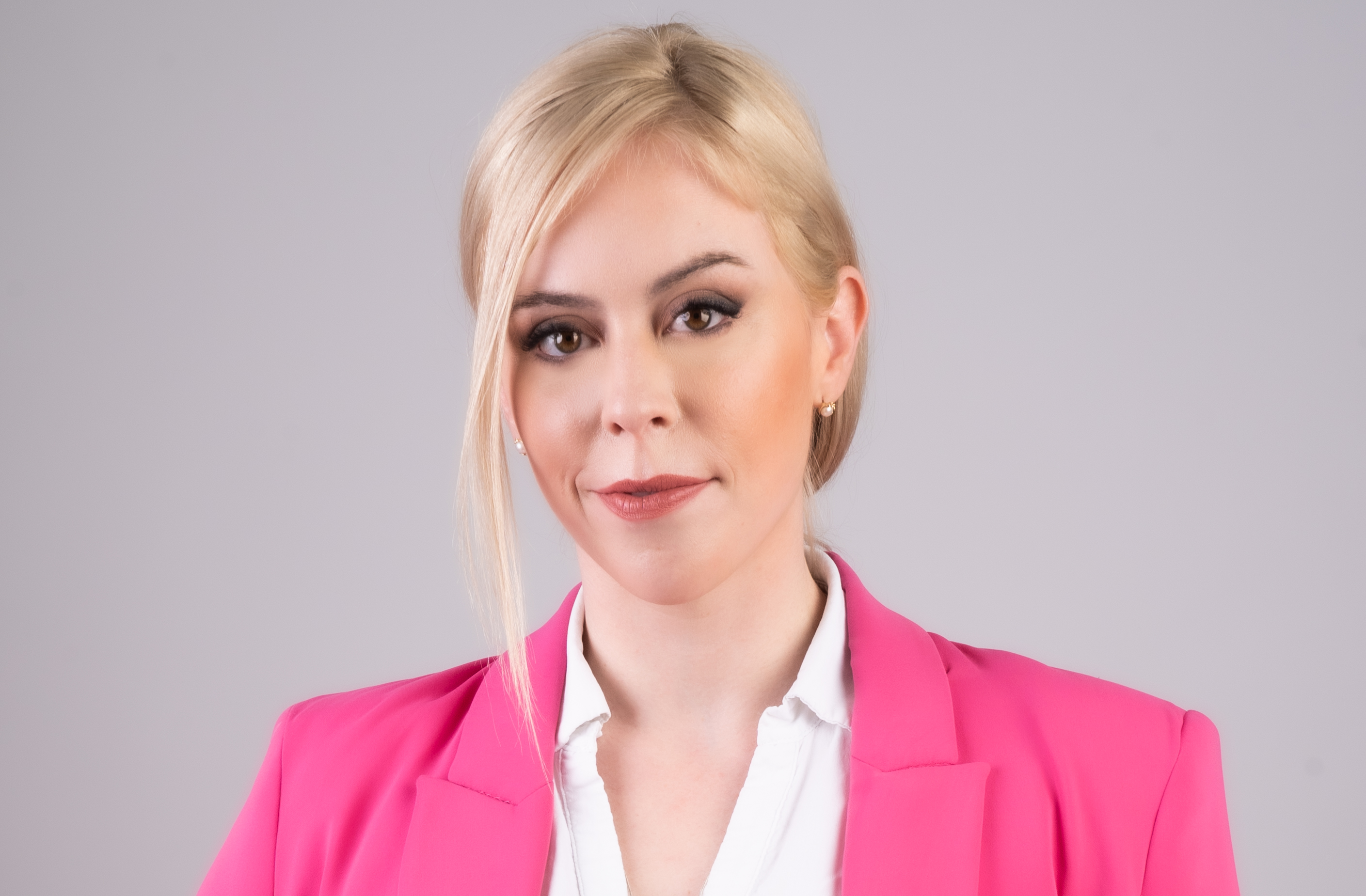
- Schrader in 2024
- Born: April 20, 1991 (age 35); Seattle, Washington, United States
- Citizenship: Israeli; American
- Education: University of Southern California; Tel Aviv University
- Occupations: Journalist; Social activist
- Website: emilyschrader.net

Emily Schrader (Hebrew: אמילי שריידר; born 20 April 1991) is an Israeli-American journalist, author, and activist. She is a news anchor at ILTV News the host Axis of Truth on JNS, and a co-host of The Quad on JNS.

== Early life ==
Schrader was born in Seattle, Washington, and raised in Los Angeles, California. She has a mixed Christian and Jewish background, and identifies as Jewish. (In Judaism, one is Jewish when born of a Jewish mother.)

Schrader studied at the University of Southern California, majoring in political science, and obtained her master's degree at Tel Aviv University in political communications. Schrader made Aliyah to Israel in 2015.

== Career ==
Schrader is a journalist, human rights activist, and campaigner against antisemitism. She has been a columnist for The Jerusalem Post and a commentator on Middle Eastern affairs. She was digital director of StandWithUs, Nonprofit pro-Israel education and advocacy organization. She is a mentor for the Karsh Journalism Fellowship.

She has advocated for women's rights in Israel and in the Middle East, with a focus on calling attention to issues women face in the Islamic Republic of Iran. In December 2023, Schrader initiated an open letter condemning the activities of the Iranian government and Hamas, which was co-signed by 55 female leaders from 12 Middle Eastern countries.

On 10 October 2023, three days after the start of the Gaza war, Emily Schrader was one of ten people appointed by Minister of Foreign Affairs Eli Cohen to advocate for Israel online during the war. The other nine team members were, Arsen Ostrovsky, Noa Tishby, Hen Mazzig, Tali Eshkoli, Michael Dickson, Joe Zevuloni, Natalie Dodon, Michal Cotler-Wunsh, and Fleur Hassan-Nahoum. The following week, Schrader and co-host Fleur Hassan-Nahoum, a foreign ministry special envoy and former deputy mayor of Jerusalem, launched The Quad on JNS TV, together with political moderator Ashira Solomon, and the former Canadian Ambassador to Israel, Vivian Bercovici.

In 2020, she helped organize an open letter urging Meta Platforms to adopt the IHRA definition of antisemitism, which includes anti-Zionism and criticism of the state of Israel in its definition of antisemitism.

Schrader was included by Algemeiner in its list of "100 People Positively Influencing Jewish Life" in 2022, In May 2023 as one of the 18 "women to watch" by Hadassah Women's Zionist Organization. She also received the 2023 Sylvan Adams Nefesh B'Nefesh Bonei Zion Award for Young Leadership, an award given to English-speaking immigrants to the state of Israel for their outstanding contributions to Israeli society. In December 2025, Emily was awarded the “Woman of Iron” award from the Israeli organization Chochmat Nashim.

Together with co-writer Blake Flayton, Schrader wrote a book titled "10 Things Every Jew Should Know Before They Go To College", which was released in February 2025. In the book, Schrader recommends that young Jews participate in Birthright Israel, learn Hebrew, and connect with Jewish communities.

== Personal life ==
Schrader and Yoseph Haddad, an Arab-Israeli journalist, were engaged in May 2021. They first met through their pro-Israel advocacy, and have delayed their wedding multiple times, including due to the October 7 attacks.
