= Yoseph Haddad =

Arab pro-Israeli activist (born 1985)

- يوسف حداد יוסף חדאד
- Official portrait, 2026
- Born: 3 September 1985 (age 41); Haifa, Israel
- Citizenship: Israeli
- Occupations: Journalist, pro-Israel advocate
- Organization: Together – Vouch for Each Other
- Known for: Social activism, political advocacy

Yoseph Haddad (Arabic: يوسف حداد; Hebrew: יוסף חדאד; born 3 September 1985) is an Arab-Israeli journalist and activist who advocates for Israel on social media and international speaking tours. He is the founder of Together – Vouch for Each Other, which works to integrate Arab Israelis into larger Israeli society. Since the beginning of the Gaza war, Haddad has become more widely known in Israel. He has been recognized by Israeli media and the Israeli Foreign Ministry for his pro-Israel advocacy.

== Early life and military service ==
Yoseph Haddad is an Arab-Israeli Orthodox Christian who was born in Haifa, Israel, and later moved to Nazareth with his family. His grandfather did not leave his land during the 1948 Palestinian expulsion and flight, and his family still owns land in Jish. His mother was a teacher and his father was a priest and civil aviator.

Although Arabs are not required to serve in the IDF, Haddad joined in 2003. He has stated that his decision was influenced by the Maxim restaurant suicide bombing that killed 21 Israelis, including several Israeli Arabs. At his request, he was accepted into the Golani Brigade and became a commander.

During the Second Lebanon War, Haddad was seriously injured by a Kornet missile in the Battle of Bint Jbeil and lost part of his foot. He is a disabled veteran who has been diagnosed with post-traumatic stress disorder. He has written about serving under commander Roi Klein who was killed in action after jumping on a grenade to save his soldiers.

== Career ==
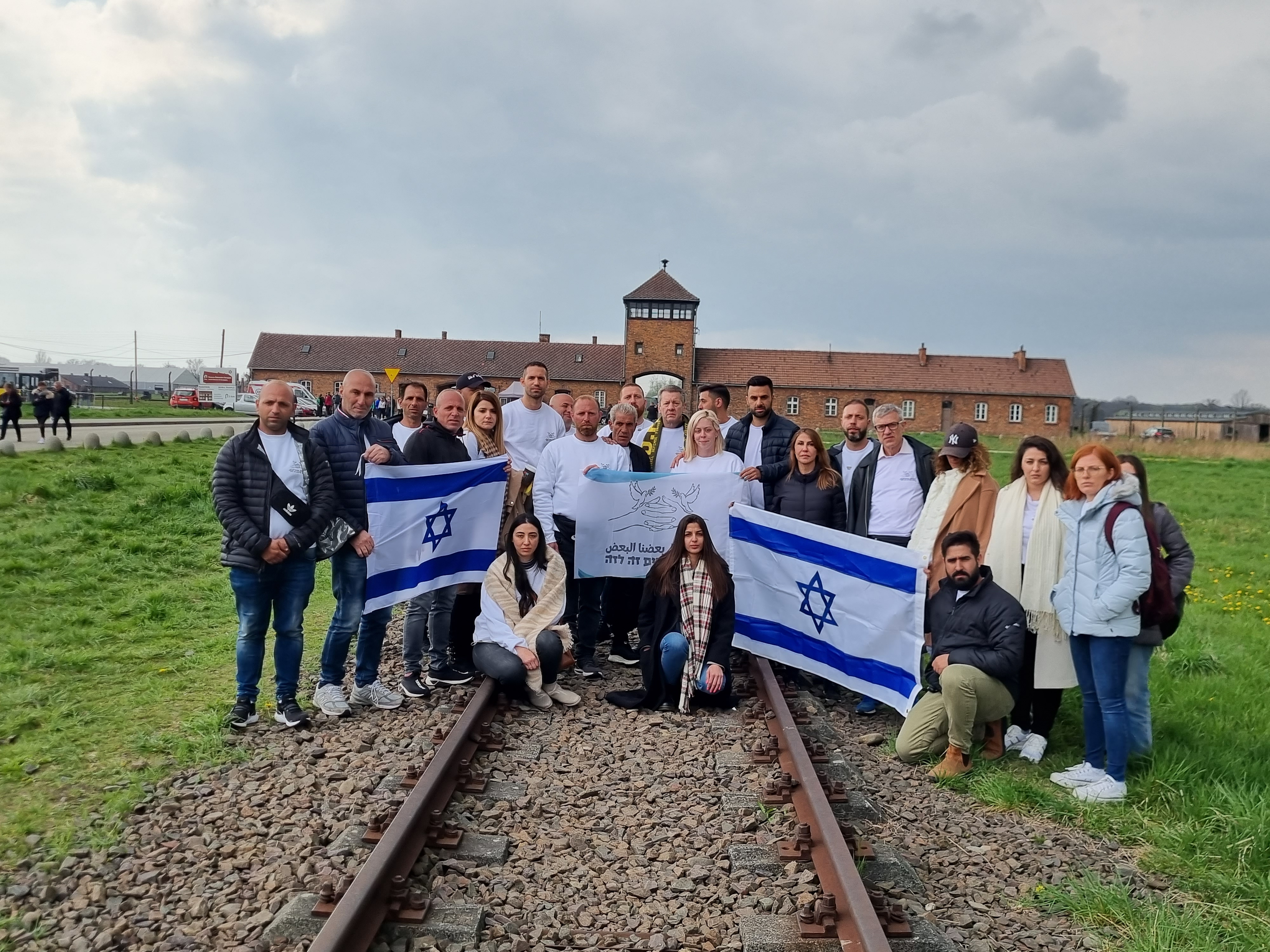
Haddad with a Together – Vouch for Each Other delegation in Auschwitz, April 2022

Haddad frequently travels internationally to speak in support of Israel and has worked with Reservists on Duty to advocate for Israel on university campuses in the US. Since 2020, Haddad has worked for i24NEWS. He also writes columns on sites such as Israel Hayom, TheMarker, and Times of Israel blogs.

In 2018, he established Together – Vouch for Each Other with the aim of working for the integration and connection of the Arab sector with Israeli society, and since then he has headed it and serves as the CEO of the association. As part of Together – Vouch for Each Other, he encourages and supports Israeli Arabs to volunteer for the IDF and national-civilian service. Together – Vouch for Each Other was credited with initiating the first living room memorial Holocaust education event in Arab-Israeli society during the Covid pandemic in 2019 and the first Holocaust Remembrance Day ceremony in the United Arab Emirates in 2021. In 2022, the group traveled to Auschwitz to participate in the March of the Living.

In March 2021, several members of the UN Human Rights Council accused Israel of racism, stating that Israel was not adequately providing COVID-19 vaccinations to Palestinians in the West Bank and Gaza. Appearing before the council on behalf of UN Watch, Haddad disputed the allegations of racism, stating that hundreds of thousands of Israeli Arabs had been vaccinated and that Israel was also vaccinating thousands of Palestinian workers. Later that year, author Sally Rooney announced that she would not allow an Israeli company to translate her book Beautiful World, Where Are You into Hebrew because of her support for the BDS movement. After Haddad organized a boycott campaign, two Israeli book sellers decided to stop selling her work.

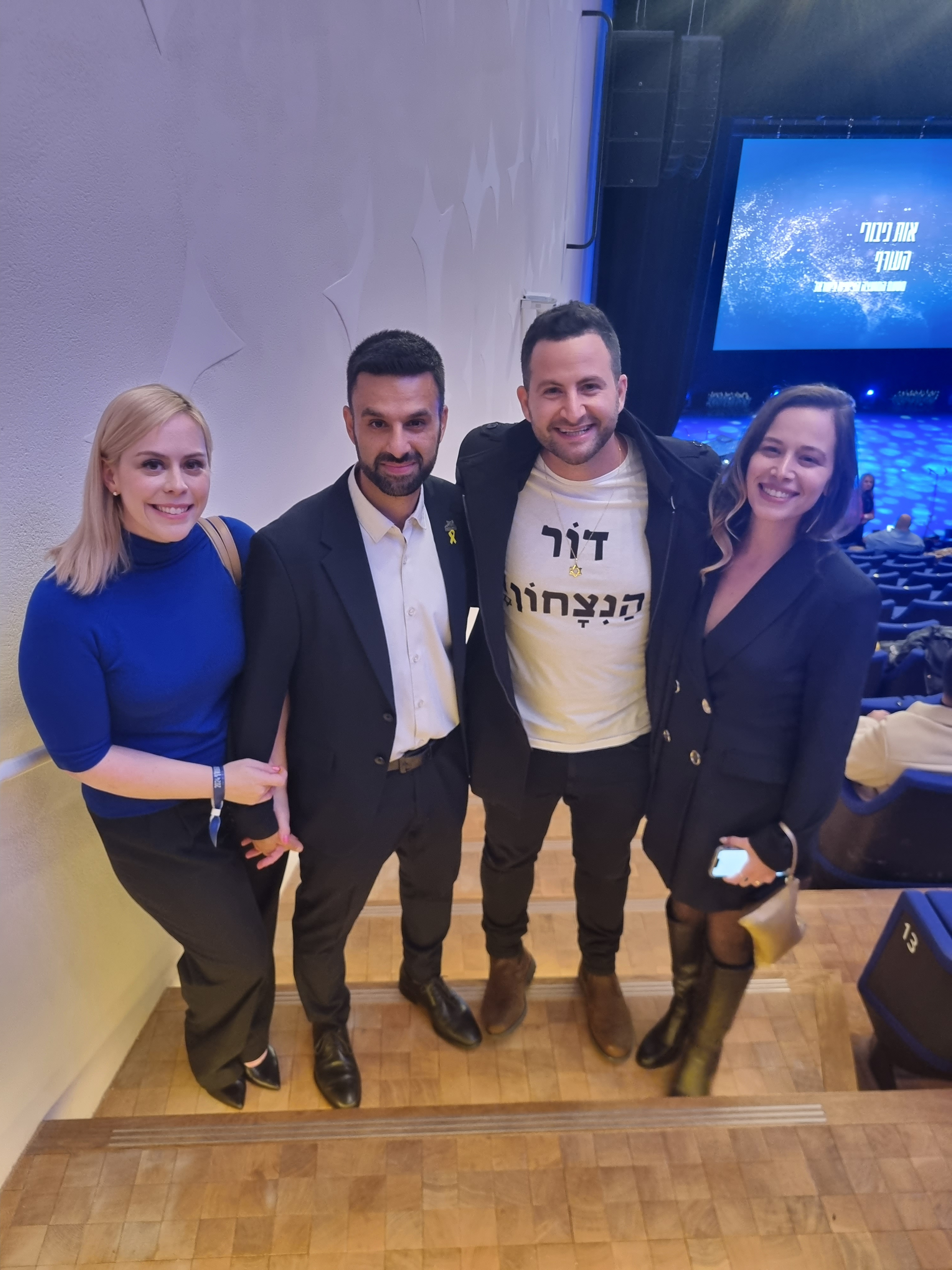
Haddad at the Heroes of the Home Front ceremony, 2024

Since the beginning of the Gaza war, Haddad has become more widely known in Israel. He began an extensive information campaign on social media, in favor of Israel and against the actions of Hamas and Islamic Jihad. He posts in multiple languages, including Hebrew, Arabic, and English. As of October 2023, he had 500,000 Instagram followers and 200,000 TikTok followers. By March 2025, he had 850,000 followers on Instagram, most of whom followed him during the Gaza war. During the war, Haddad has been a frequent contributor to Israeli TV channels including i24NEWS and Channel 14; HaAyin HaShevi'it found that he accounted for a large proportion of Israeli media appearances by Israeli Arabs.

In one viral video from 2023, Haddad told pro-Palestinian students at Tel Aviv University to "go study in Jenin". He posted videos of himself eating baklava to celebrate the deaths of Iranian president Ebrahim Raisi and Hamas leader Yahya Sinwar. He tweeted that Israeli journalist Yuval Abraham was a hypocrite for his involvement in the film No Other Land and that Palestinian singer Lina Makoul should lose her Israeli citizenship because she advertised her concert as taking place in "Haifa, Palestine".

In a November 2024 Oxford Union debate, Haddad joined Natasha Hausdorff, Jonathan Sacerdoti, and Mosab Hassan Yousef in arguing against the proposition: "This House Believes Israel is an apartheid state responsible for genocide". The event was contentious: the audience booed Haddad's speech and he called them "terrorist supporters". Later, he was escorted out of the room by event staff for alleged poor conduct, and he put on a shirt with the text "Your terrorist is dead" and a picture of Hassan Nasrallah. Haddad tweeted that he was removed from the debate because he objected to audience members' disrespect for the Israeli hostages. The proposition passed.

In early 2025, Haddad published Let Me Explain, which became an Israel Hayom bestseller. He called the book "an opportunity to lay out my complete vision". In the book, he recounts the story of his life and his views on the Arab-Israeli conflict, including his support for Israel's use of military force to resolve the conflict and his vision for achieving a "partnership" between Israeli Arabs and Jews. He writes that most Israeli Arabs want to integrate into Israeli society; this statement was disputed in a review in Haaretz. The reviewer also argued that it is unlikely that Haddad will be able to help Jews and Arabs reconcile, given the Palestinian community's negative opinion of him.

On 11 May 2026, Haddad was reported to be considering running in the 2026 Israeli legislative election with a new party, partnering with former Jerusalem Deputy Mayor Fleur Hassan-Nahoum. They instead became part of Ofer Winter's new party, Amcha Yisrael, in August 2026.

== Personal life ==
Haddad identifies as an Israeli Arab. He is engaged to Emily Schrader, an Israeli-American journalist and fellow activist. He proposed to her on a work trip to the Gaza envelope during the 2021 Israel–Palestine crisis "with soldiers and police in the background and amid the noise of Air Force jets bombing Gaza". Haddad is a fan of Maccabi Tel Aviv.

In October 2024, Haddad was awarded 24,000 shekels after suing a left-wing Israeli activist for defamation. In July 2025, Haddad was arrested after firing a gun during a brawl with another man on a road in Jaffa. According to Haddad's lawyer, an Israeli Arab man recognized Haddad and attacked him due to "racism and hatred". The other man accused Haddad of starting the fight. The police said the incident appeared to be motivated by road rage rather than racism.

== Views ==
Haddad opposes the BDS movement. Haddad has criticized the Nationality Bill for removing Arabic as an official language of Israel. Although Haddad recognizes that Arab Israelis experience discrimination, he opposes the characterization of Israel as an apartheid state, stating that Arab Israelis are "an integral part of the Israeli society". He has written opinion pieces on the topic, including one where he argued that using the term to describe Israel diminishes and cheapens the suffering of Black South Africans who lived under apartheid for many years. In 2021, Haddad appeared before the Irish parliament to dispute Amnesty International's report alleging Israeli apartheid.

Haddad's views are considered right wing. According to Haddad he gave interviews before the October 7 attacks where he warned that Israel was not doing enough to stop Hamas. He opposes the view that Israel is committing genocide in Gaza and believes that Israel is "freeing the Middle East" and "saving the entire world". To create peace in the Arab-Israeli conflict, he advocates for changing the Palestinian education curriculum and that, in Israel, everyone should learn both Hebrew and Arabic.

== Reception ==
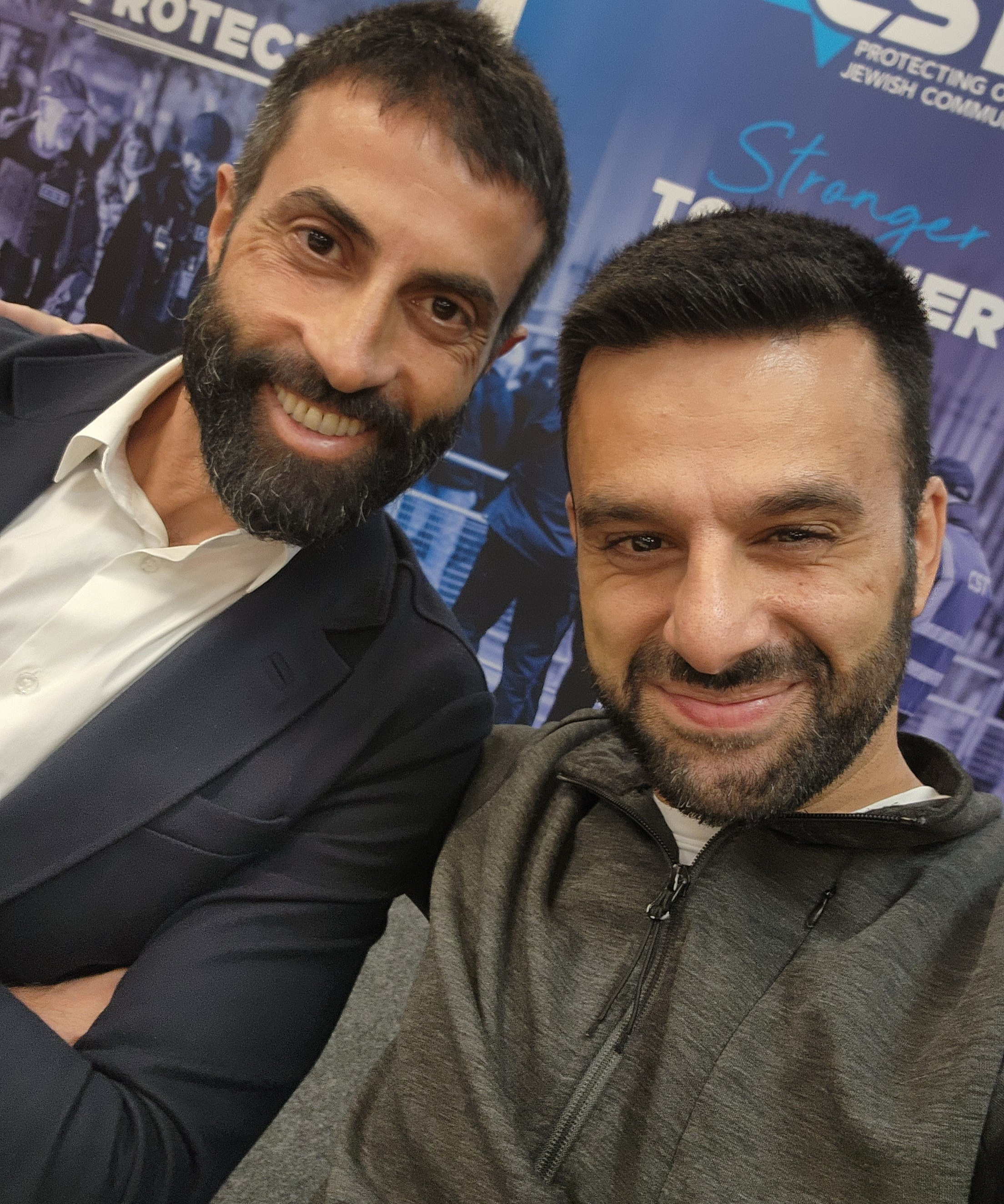
Haddad with Mosab Hassan Yousef at the University of Oxford, November 2024

Haddad has received recognition for his pro-Israel advocacy. Israel Hayom has said he is: "one of Israel's most vital representatives on the world stage and across social media", and Calcalist said he is "one of the most eloquent and influential speakers for the State of Israel". The Jerusalem Post has also praised Haddad's advocacy and communication skills while noting his "sometimes outrageous persona". Haaretz has referred to him as "Israel's favorite Arab hasbarista".

Haddad has been recognized on lists of pro-Israel influencers, including lists by The Jerusalem Post and the Jewish News Syndicate. Haddad received the Light of Israel prize from the Israeli Foreign Ministry in 2021 and the Begin Prize in 2022. For his work during the Gaza war, the Zionist Council in Israel recognized him as one of 16 "Heroes of the Home Front" in 2024. In May 2024, he was selected to light a torch at the Israeli Independence Day celebration for his contributions to hasbara. The following month, Ariel University granted him an honorary degree for his "relentless efforts in combating anti-Semitism, fostering unity among diverse populations, and presenting Israel's true face to the world".

According to his lawyers, he has received death threats and been physically attacked because of his pro-Israel advocacy. Haddad has stated that he has "been called much worse than a traitor". While on a StandWithUs speaking tour of British universities in early 2023, Haddad was met by crowds of protesters. He stated that he had to be escorted off of Nottingham University campus for safety reasons. That August, he reported that some Israeli Arabs attacked him and his family on a flight from Dubai, injuring his mother and calling him "the traitor, the dog". In April 2024, a scheduled appearance by Haddad at Columbia University was canceled after he was allegedly assaulted by a protester.

Haddad has been accused of contributing to misinformation during the Gaza war, including sharing false claims that photos of dead Gazan children actually depicted dolls. The Palestinian community has criticized him as ignoring the discrimination they face and using his Arab identity to further the aims of the Israeli government. According to Haaretz, his views are not reflective of the views of the majority of Palestinians in Israel.
