= Laura Ben-David =

American-Israeli photographer, writer, and speaker (1969–2025)

- Born: Laura Ginsberg; February 6, 1969; Yonkers, New York, U.S.
- Died: July 17, 2025 (aged 56); Jerusalem, Israel
- Other name: Laura Ben David
- Occupations: Photographer, writer, speaker, marketing consultant
- Years active: 2002–2025
- Notable work: Moving Up: An Aliyah Journal (2007); Jewish Life Photo Bank
- Spouse: Lawrence Ben-David (m. 1988) Raphael M. Barishansky (m. 2023)
- Children: 6

Laura Ben-David (née Ginsberg; February 6, 1969 – July 17, 2025) was an American-Israeli photographer, writer, public speaker, and marketing consultant. Based in Israel from 2002 until her death, she was known for her landscape, event, and documentary photography of Jewish and Israeli life, for her memoir Moving Up: An Aliyah Journal, and as the driving force behind the Jewish Life Photo Bank, a stock-photography initiative documenting Orthodox Jewish women that was renamed in her honor after her death.

== Early life ==
Ben-David was born in Yonkers, New York, to Marty Ginsberg, an accountant and accounting teacher, and Carol Fishman Ginsberg, a social worker. The family later moved to Monsey, New York, when she was three, and she attended the Yeshiva of Spring Valley and Bruriah High School before graduating from Bat Torah Academy and studying at Touro College. She later lived in Florida, where she worked as a registered nurse at Baptist Health Boca Raton Regional Hospital. Before her career in photography and media, she also worked as a preschool teacher, youth worker, and makeup artist.

== Career ==
=== Move to Israel and early media work ===
Ben-David made aliyah from Boca Raton, Florida, to Israel in 2002 on one of the first Nefesh B'Nefesh charter flights, settling initially in Neve Daniel with her husband and four children; she had two more children after arriving in Israel. By 2021 she was living in Tekoa, in Gush Etzion, before later moving to Jerusalem. She began writing about her immigration experience shortly after arriving, and her essays on Israeli and Jewish life were later published widely; she was a regular blogger for The Times of Israel and, from 2021 to 2023, a recurring opinion contributor to The Forward, writing on topics including terrorist attacks in Israel, Jewish-Arab coexistence initiatives, and an incident in which a bar mitzvah she was hired to photograph at the Kotel was disrupted by Haredi protesters. She was also a recurring panelist on The Quad, a weekly video program produced by JNS, where she and Chochmat Nashim co-founder Shoshanna Keats Jaskoll discussed current events affecting Israel and the Jewish world. Her account of the move initially took the form of emails to friends and family, which circulated increasingly widely and were eventually developed into Moving Up: An Aliyah Journal, published in December 2006 (some later sources give 2007) by Mazo Publishers, with a foreword by Nefesh B'Nefesh executive director Rabbi Yehoshua Fass. The Jerusalem Post profiled Ben-David around the book's release, describing how her originally private emails about the move gained a readership that grew from friends and family to "hundreds," then thousands, of readers.

From 2007 to 2014, Ben-David served as social media coordinator and later social media director at Nefesh B'Nefesh, where she worked with new immigrants to help document and share their personal stories. She subsequently became director of marketing and new media at Shavei Israel, an organization that works with communities of Jewish descent in Latin America, India, and Africa; in that role she photographed and publicized Jewish communities in those regions.

From 2014 onward, she worked independently as a freelance event and fine-art photographer, writer, public speaker, and marketing consultant through her own business, Laura Ben-David/LBD Creative. She was represented by the Jewish Speakers Bureau and gave presentations in the United States and Israel on Aliyah, Israel advocacy, and Jewish communities such as the Bnei Menashe.

=== Photography and the Jewish Life Photo Bank ===
Ben-David's photography ranged from Israeli landscapes, including the Old City of Jerusalem, the Gush Etzion hills, and the Hula Valley, to event, portrait, and documentary work. Her images appeared in exhibitions, books, and journals over the course of her career.

She was a founding board member of Chochmat Nashim, an Orthodox Israeli women's advocacy organization founded by writer and activist Shoshanna Keats Jaskoll, and served as lead photographer for its Jewish Life Photo Bank, a stock-image initiative launched in 2021 to counter the exclusion of women's images from much of the Orthodox and ultra-Orthodox press. The Jewish Chronicle has also credited Ben-David as one of the Photo Bank's founders. The initiative grew out of a 2019 discussion among Orthodox women in marketing and communications, and received coverage in outlets including the Jerusalem Post, Jewish News Syndicate, Religion News Service, and The Jewish Press. These outlets described it as a response to a longstanding practice of removing women from Orthodox media for reasons of religious modesty, citing earlier incidents such as the 2011 photo-editing of Hillary Clinton and Angela Merkel out of a Situation Room photograph by a Hasidic newspaper. Ben-David's photographs illustrated much of this coverage, credited throughout as the Photo Bank's principal photographer. As part of the project, Ben-David traveled to photograph Jewish women in London, Paris, New York, and Jerusalem. She documented the stories of agunot, women unable to obtain a religious divorce, including London-based activist Leah Hochhauser, and photographed public demonstrations on their behalf. Keren David, managing editor of The Jewish Chronicle, said the Photo Bank filled what she described as a longstanding gap in Jewish media's visual representation of women. Ramie Smith, founder of the agunah advocacy group GetOutUK, said Ben-David's photography and calming presence helped persuade agunot who had previously avoided publicity to be photographed and interviewed on camera.

In early 2025, as Ben-David underwent treatment for ovarian cancer, friends and colleagues organized a crowdfunded exhibition of her photography, Beautiful Israel: The People and The Land Through the Lens of Laura Ben-David, held on March 24, 2025, at the Jerusalem offices of StandWithUs. A selection of her work was subsequently placed on permanent display at the Nefesh B'Nefesh entrance hall in Jerusalem, and later became a permanent installation in the cancer center at Shaare Zedek Medical Center in Jerusalem, where she had received treatment.

== Personal life ==
Ben-David was married to Lawrence Ben-David in 1988; the couple later divorced. She later began a long-distance relationship with Raphael M. Barishansky, then Pennsylvania's deputy secretary of health, after he reached out to her following the deaths of both their fathers from COVID-19 in the summer of 2020; the couple, who had been introduced years earlier by mutual friend Shoshanna Keats Jaskoll, married in March 2023. She had six children (Shyra, Lexi, Eitan, Ezra, Kobi, and Maya) and, by the time of her death, nine grandchildren. She described herself as an Israel advocate and Zionist, and was active in commentary on Israeli and Jewish current events through her blogging and social media presence.

== Death ==
Ben-David died at her home in Jerusalem on July 17, 2025, at the age of 56, following treatment for ovarian cancer. In the months before her death, she spoke about approaching her illness with a determination to keep living fully and with purpose. Her death was reported by The Times of Israel, JNS, The Jewish Chronicle, and other outlets, which described her as a prominent voice within the Anglo-Israeli immigrant community.

Following her death, the Jewish Life Photo Bank was renamed the Laura Ben David Jewish Life Photo Bank in her honor.

== Works ==
- Moving Up: An Aliyah Journal (Mazo Publishers, 2007), ISBN 978-9657344149
