= Michal Cotler-Wunsh =

Israeli politician

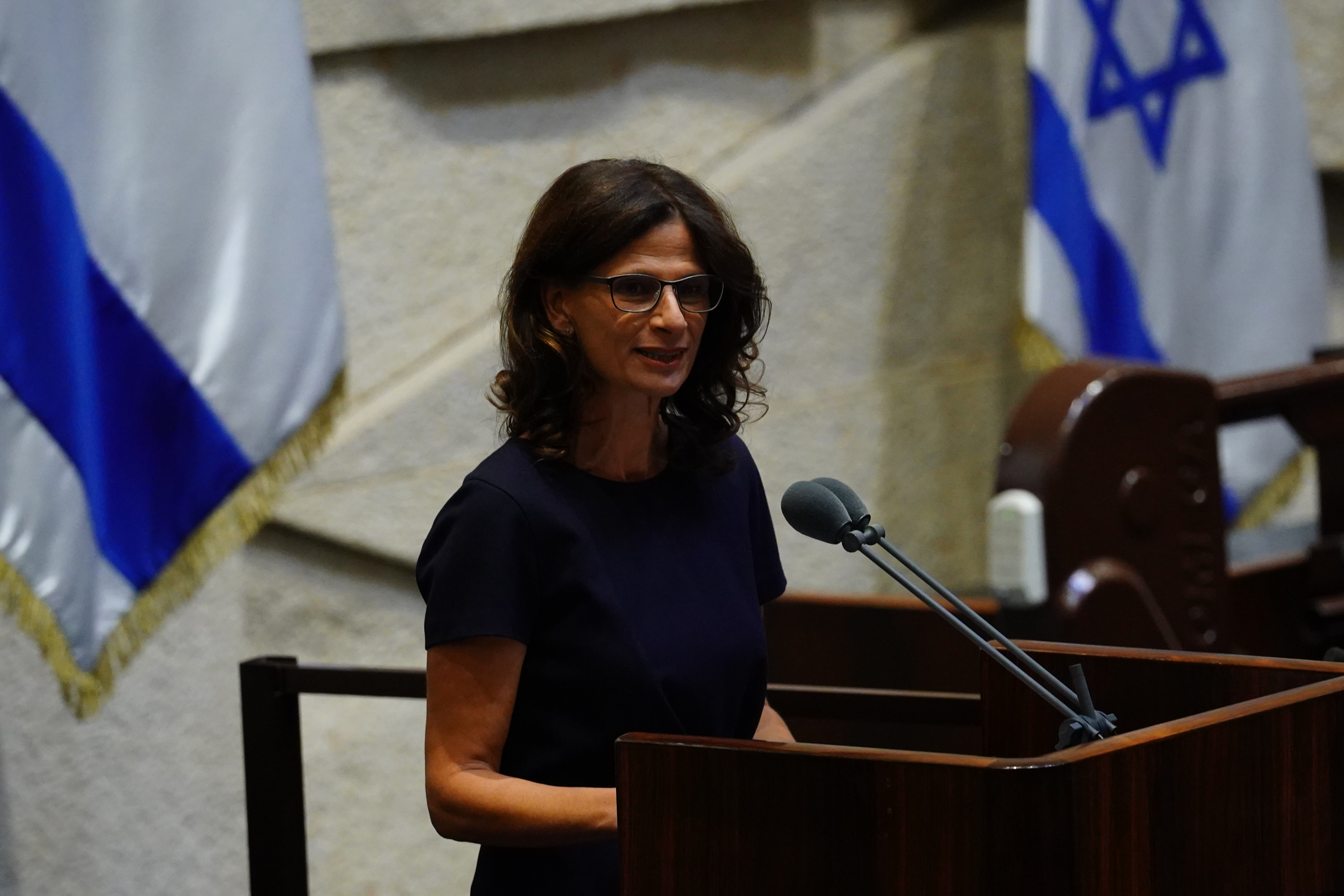
- Cotler-Wunsh in 2020

Faction represented in the Knesset
- 2020–2021: Blue and White

Personal details
- Born: 18 December 1970 (age 55) Jerusalem, Israel

Michal Cotler-Wunsh (Hebrew: מיכל קוטלר-וונש; born 18 December 1970) is an Israeli academic, policy advisor and politician. She served as a member of the Knesset for the Blue and White alliance from 2020 to 2021 and was Israel's Special envoy for combating antisemitism Israel. She is currently the CEO of the International Legal Forum.

== Early life and education ==
Cotler-Wunsh was born in Jerusalem; her mother Ariela Ze'evi was secretary of Gahal and Likud during Menachem Begin's leadership. When she was eight years old, her family moved to Montreal after her mother married Canadian lawyer, politician and human rights activist Irwin Cotler. After graduating high school, she enrolled for a gap year at the Hebrew University of Jerusalem. A year later she began her national service in the Israel Defense Forces, training new recruits. She returned to the Hebrew University to earn a law degree, after which she worked at the Ministry of Justice. After 13 years in Israel Cotler-Wunsh moved back to Canada, where she earned a master's degree at McGill University and taught at the university. Her PhD research focused on freedom of speech on university campuses, tracking the effects of (attempted) regulation of speech. A decade after leaving Israel, she and her family returned.

== Career ==
Prior to becoming a member of the Knesset, Cotler-Wunsch served as Director of International Relations at IDC Herzliya. She was a research fellow at the International Institute for Counter-Terrorism at IDC Herzliya and a board member of several non profit organizations, including Tzav Pius, an NGO dedicated to connecting Israelis along the secular-religious spectrum. She previously served as a scholar-in-residence for the Jewish Federations of North America, Strategy & Policy advisor to Nefesh B'Nefesh, Director of International External Relations at the IDC Herzliya and was a PhD candidate in the Human Rights under Pressure - Ethics, Law and Politics program at the Hebrew University of Jerusalem and the Freie Universität of Berlin.

=== Political career ===
She was appointed to the group writing a manifesto for the new Telem party of Moshe Ya'alon, which was established in early 2019. After Telem joined the Blue and White alliance, she was placed forty-sixth on its list for the April 2019 elections, in which it won 35 seats. She was given the same spot for the September 2019 elections, again failing to win a seat. However, she was moved up to thirty-sixth for the March 2020 elections. Although the alliance won only 33 seats, she entered the Knesset on 19 June 2020 as a replacement for Alon Schuster, who had resigned his seat under the Norwegian Law after being appointed to the cabinet. Between the election and her entry to the Knesset, she remained in the splintered Blue and White alliance that formed a unity government and served as a member of Knesset. She announced on 29 December that she would be leaving the party.

During the 23rd Knesset Cotler-Wunsh served as Chair of the Special Committee on Drug and Alcohol Use, Chair of the Subcommittee on Israel-Diaspora Relations and as a member of several committees including the Foreign Affairs and Security Committee, Constitution, Law and Justice Committee and the Children's Rights, Women's Status and Immigration and Integration Committee.

She was the first Knesset Liaison to the Issue of the International Criminal Court (ICC), was co-chair of the Canada-Israel Interparliamentary Friendship Group, a member of several inter-parliamentary working groups and chair of the Caucus for Ethiopians in Israel.

Cotler-Wunsh co-founded the Interparliamentary Task Force to Combat Online Antisemitism, together with multi-partisan elected officials from Canada, Australia, the US and the UK.

=== Envoy for combating antisemitism ===
In September 2023 Cotler-Wunsh was appointed by the Foreign Ministry as Israel's antisemitism envoy. On 10 October 2023, three days after the start of the Gaza war, Cotler-Wunsh was one of ten people appointed by Minister of Foreign Affairs Eli Cohen to advocate for Israel online during the war. The other influencers were: Arsen Ostrovsky, Noa Tishby, Hen Mazzig, Tali Eshkoli, Michael Dickson, Joe Zevuloni, Natalie Dodon, Emily Schrader, and Fleur Hassan-Nahoum. Cotler-Wunsh features in the film Tragic Awakening, discussing the rise in antisemitism after the October 7 attacks on Israel.

== Community work ==
Cotler-Wunsh is a trustee in the Rabbi Sacks Legacy. She is a legal advisor to the Goldin family, dedicated to the return of deceased Israeli soldiers Hadar Goldin and Oron Shaul and civilians Avera Mengistu and Hisham al-Sayed.

== Author ==
Cotler-Wunsh has written for websites including Jewish News Syndicate, Newsweek, The Jerusalem Post, The Times of Israel and Politico.

== Personal life ==
Michal lives in Ra'anana, Israel, with her husband and their four children.

== See also ==
- List of combating antisemitism envoys
