= Shoshanna Keats Jaskoll =

American-Israeli writer and Orthodox Jewish women's rights activist

- Born: 1975 (age 50–51); Lakewood Township, New Jersey
- Citizenship: American, Israeli
- Occupations: Writer, activist
- Partner: Shai Jaskoll
- Website: skjaskoll.com

Shoshanna Keats Jaskoll (Hebrew: שושנה קיטס יאסקול; born 1975) is an American-Israeli writer and activist. She co-founded Chochmat Nashim, an Israeli non-governmental organization that challenges extremist trends in Orthodox communities and advocates for the visibility and rights of Jewish women. Her writing has appeared in The Times of Israel, The Jerusalem Post, The Forward, Tablet, and The Jewish Chronicle.

== Early life and immigration ==
Keats Jaskoll was born and raised in Lakewood Township, New Jersey. In 2007 she moved to Israel with her family and settled in Beit Shemesh. She has cited her aunt's drawn-out get case, in which her aunt spent years seeking a religious divorce through a rabbinical court, as the experience that first drew her to advocacy.

== Chochmat Nashim ==
Keats Jaskoll co-founded Chochmat Nashim (Hebrew: חכמת נשים, "Women's Wisdom") with a group of other Orthodox women. The organization works against what it describes as damaging extremist trends in the Orthodox world, with a focus on two issues in particular: the exclusion of women's images from Haredi and Orthodox publications, and the situation of agunot, women whose husbands refuse to grant them a religious divorce.

=== Erasure of women from Orthodox media ===
A number of Haredi and some Orthodox publications do not print photographs of women. Keats Jaskoll has been among the most vocal critics of this practice, arguing, along with several historians of American Orthodoxy, that it has no basis in Jewish law and causes real harm to women's health, finances, and communal standing.

In 2021, Chochmat Nashim launched the Jewish Life Photo Bank, a stock photography project built around images of Orthodox women, girls, and families. More than 200 volunteers (models, photographers, and stylists) participated in shoots held in the United States and Israel. The bank was intended to give media outlets, advertisers, and Jewish organizations access to imagery of religious women that they could not otherwise find. It was later renamed in memory of Laura Ben David, a photographer who had volunteered with the project.

=== Agunot and Rate My Beit Din ===
Keats Jaskoll's interest in the agunah issue dates to her aunt's case, which she witnessed firsthand. She has argued that the majority of get-refusal cases do not require changes to Jewish law to resolve; reformed procedures and different communal norms within the beit din system would be enough to address most of them.

In 2022, Chochmat Nashim launched Rate My Beit Din (ratemybeitdin.com), a user-review platform for the divorce departments of batei din around the world, described by the organization as a "Yelp for batei din." Users can submit ratings based on cost, response time, and their overall experience. The site also offers training resources to batei din and is available in English, French, and Hebrew.

In 2024, activist Adina Sash organized a high-profile campaign to pressure the husband of Satmar agunah Malky Berkowitz into granting her a get. The campaign included rallies, billboard trucks, and an airplane banner over Kiryas Joel, and culminated in a call for a communal "mikvah strike." Rabbi Hershel Schachter issued a public letter criticizing the strike as "a terribly destructive idea." Keats Jaskoll, whose Chochmat Nashim podcast had previously interviewed Sash about her agunah work, responded to Schachter's letter not by endorsing the strike but by criticizing his focus: "Malky sits alone," she wrote on X. "Apparently she doesn't warrant a letter or action." Berkowitz received her get in early 2026.

== Writing and public speaking ==
Keats Jaskoll writes on Orthodox women's rights, Israeli society, and antisemitism. Her byline has appeared in The Times of Israel, The Jerusalem Post, The Forward, Tablet, and The Jewish Chronicle, among other outlets. She lectures internationally on religious extremism, antisemitism, Zionism, and feminism within Orthodox Judaism, and co-hosts the Chochmat Nashim podcast with Anne Gordon.

Following the October 7, 2023 attacks, Keats Jaskoll joined The Quad as a co-host. The show is a weekly panel program on JNS TV, founded and hosted by Fleur Hassan-Nahoum, former Deputy Mayor of Jerusalem. Journalist Emily Schrader is also a co-host. The program focuses on news and commentary related to Israel, the Middle East, and the Jewish world.

She is also a co-founder of REACH3K, a branding and communications firm based in Israel.

== Personal life ==
Keats Jaskoll lives in Beit Shemesh, Israel, with her husband Shai Jaskoll and their family.
