= Fleur Hassan-Nahoum =

Israeli politician and policymaker

- פלר חסן-נחום
- Hassan-Nahoum in 2026

Deputy Mayor of Jerusalem
- In office December 2018 – March 2024

Member of the Jerusalem City Council
- In office May 2016 – March 2024

Personal details
- Born: 27 September 1973 (age 53) London, England
- Citizenship: United Kingdom • Israel
- Party: Amcha Yisrael (since 2026)
- Other political affiliations: Yerushalmim (2013–2022); Likud (2019–2026)
- Spouse: Adam Nahoum (m. 1998)
- Children: 4
- Parent: Sir Joshua Hassan (father)
- Relatives: Marlene Hassan-Nahon (sister)
- Education: King's College London
- Occupation: Lawyer • Politician
- Awards: Bonei Zion Prize (2024)

Fleur Hassan-Nahoum (Hebrew: פלר חסן-נחום; born 27 September 1973) is an Israeli politician and media commentator. She is special envoy for trade innovation for the Ministry of Foreign Affairs, and secretary-general of Kol Israel. She was Deputy Mayor of Jerusalem from 2018 until 2023, and was previously a member of the Jerusalem city council. She is one of a few British citizens to hold a senior political role in Israel.

Since 2023, she has co-hosted The Quad on JNS TV.

== Early life and education ==
Fleur Hassan-Nahoum was born in London and grew up in Gibraltar. She is the daughter of Sir Joshua Hassan, the first Mayor of Gibraltar and later the first Chief Minister of Gibraltar, and his second wife, Lady Marcelle Bensimon, both of Moroccan, Spanish, and Portuguese Jewish origin. Her younger sister, Marlene Hassan Nahon, was a Member of the Gibraltar Parliament (MP). She speaks Hebrew, English and Spanish.

In 1991, at the age of 18, Hassan-Nahoum moved back to London to study law at King's College London, where she was president of the King's College Jewish Society.

=== Early career ===
After qualifying as a barrister in 1997, she was a barrister at Middle Temple in London and became campaign director of World Jewish Relief, a British Jewish charitable organization.

In 2001, Hassan-Nahoum emigrated to Israel. She was a senior associate with the American Jewish Joint Distribution Committee until 2007, when she became CEO of Tikva Children's Home, which houses abandoned and abused Jewish children from former Soviet countries. Hassan-Nahoum also founded Message Experts, a communications consultancy.

== Political career ==
In 2013, Hassan-Nahoum became involved in politics after being asked to help a small political party with their messaging. She joined the Yerushalmim Party that year, and in 2016 was elected to the Jerusalem City Council. She led the Yerushalmim Party from 2017 until 2018.

=== Deputy Mayor of Jerusalem (2018–2023) ===
In the 2018 Jerusalem municipal election, Hassan-Nahoum ran as number 2 in the Jerusalem Will Succeed Party, and was included on Zeev Elkin's electoral list. Mayor Moshe Lion named her Deputy Mayor of Jerusalem on November 13, 2018. Hassan-Nahoum was in charge of Foreign Relations, International Economic Development and Tourism, and a board member of the Jerusalem Development Authority. She oversaw the development of business and philanthropy in the city. She was widely considered the city's "foreign minister" responsible for helping to improve the city's economy and international standing.

In 2020, Hassan-Nahoum was one of the founding members of the UAE–Israel Business Council, which was established following the Abraham Accords Peace Treaty between Israel, the UAE and Bahrain. In October 2020, Hassan led a delegation that visited the two Gulf states to pursue cooperation. Hassan-Nahoum organized an inaugural meeting of the Gulf–Israel Women's Forum, a group of women that serves as a division of the UAE–Israel Business Council.

That year, Hassan-Nahoum also co-founded FemForward, a program based in Jerusalem that supports women in the technology industry. In 2023, she visited Casablanca for the launch of its MENA program.

She is on the board of the Jewish Agency for Israel, and was a candidate for its chair in 2021.

=== Special Envoy for Innovation, Ministry of Foreign Affairs (2023–present) ===
In September 2023, Minister Eli Cohen appointed her as special envoy of the Ministry of Foreign Affairs for Innovation.

On 10 October 2023, three days after the start of the Gaza war, Hassan-Nahoum was one of ten people appointed by Minister of Foreign Affairs Eli Cohen to advocate for Israel online during the war. The other nine team members were, Arsen Ostrovsky, Noa Tishby, Hen Mazzig, Tali Eshkoli, Michael Dickson, Joe Zevuloni, Natalie Dodon, Emily Schrader, and Michal Cotler-Wunsh. The following week, Hassan-Nahoum launched The Quad on JNS TV with co-hosts Emily Schrader, an Israeli journalist, and Vivian Bercovici, the former Canadian Ambassador to Israel.

In 2024, Hassan-Nahoum became secretary-general of the Kol Israel faction of the World Zionist Congress. She is the first woman to be appointed secretary-general of Kol Israel. In 2025, Hassan-Nahoum lodged a complaint with the World Zionist Congress, citing inflammatory rhetoric, aggressive behavior, and blackmail by Betar US, a coalition member of the Zionist Organization of America (ZOA). In response, the congress barred Betar US' founder, Ronn Torossian, from running as a delegate for the ZOA.

Hassan-Nahoum is a senior fellow for the Misgav Institute for National Security and Zionist Strategy and a member of its international advisory council. She received the Bonei Zion Prize for Israeli advocacy in 2024.

=== Amcha Yisrael ===
Hassan-Nahoum is on the electoral slate of Ofer Winter's new party, Amcha Yisrael, which failed to enter the Knesset during the 2026 election. Her party was accused of wasting many votes.

== Views ==
Hassan-Nahoum's platform is pluralistic. She is known for supporting women's rights in Israel and encouraging increasing political participation by women, including ultra-Orthodox Haredi women. She has also advocated for issues affecting minority communities including Haredi Jews, Ethiopian Israelis, Arabs, and immigrants, and encouraged greater participation in the workforce by minority groups such as Arab women and Haredi men.

During a 2021 conflict between members of the far-right Lehava organization and Palestinians in East Jerusalem, she denounced extremism and urged leaders of Jewish and Arab communities to prevent further violence. Speaking on the controversy over attempted Israeli evictions of Palestinian families in Sheikh Jarrah, Hassan-Nahoum defended Israeli government policies which allow Jews to reclaim property allegedly abandoned following Israel's War of Independence: "This is a Jewish country. There's only one. And of course there are laws that some people may consider as favoring Jews — it's a Jewish state. It is here to protect the Jewish people."

During the Gaza war, she claimed that Hamas had influenced antisemitism among left wing activists in the United Kingdom.

In 2023, she defended Christian worshippers in the Old City of Jerusalem following a clash between Jews and Evangelical Christians visiting the Western Wall.

While speaking on LBC in December 2023 she made the erroneous claims that "There are no churches in Gaza" and also that there were no Christians there, whilst speaking on Pope Francis' condemnation of the killing of Nahida and Samar Anton at the Holy Family Church in Gaza City.

In July 2025, during an interview with Krishnan Guru-Murthy on Channel 4 News, Hassan‑Nahoum said: "So‑called Gaza doctors have been hiding terrorists in tunnels," stating that "it would be proven soon enough that so-called doctors have been involved in terrorist activities".

== Personal life ==
In 1998, she married Adam Nahoum and they moved to Israel in 2001. They have four children together, all of whom were born in Israel. She describes herself as a religious Jew and a Zionist.

== See also ==
- Female representation in local government in Israel
- Municipality of Jerusalem
