= Eli Cohen (politician, born 1972) =

Israeli politician (born 1972)

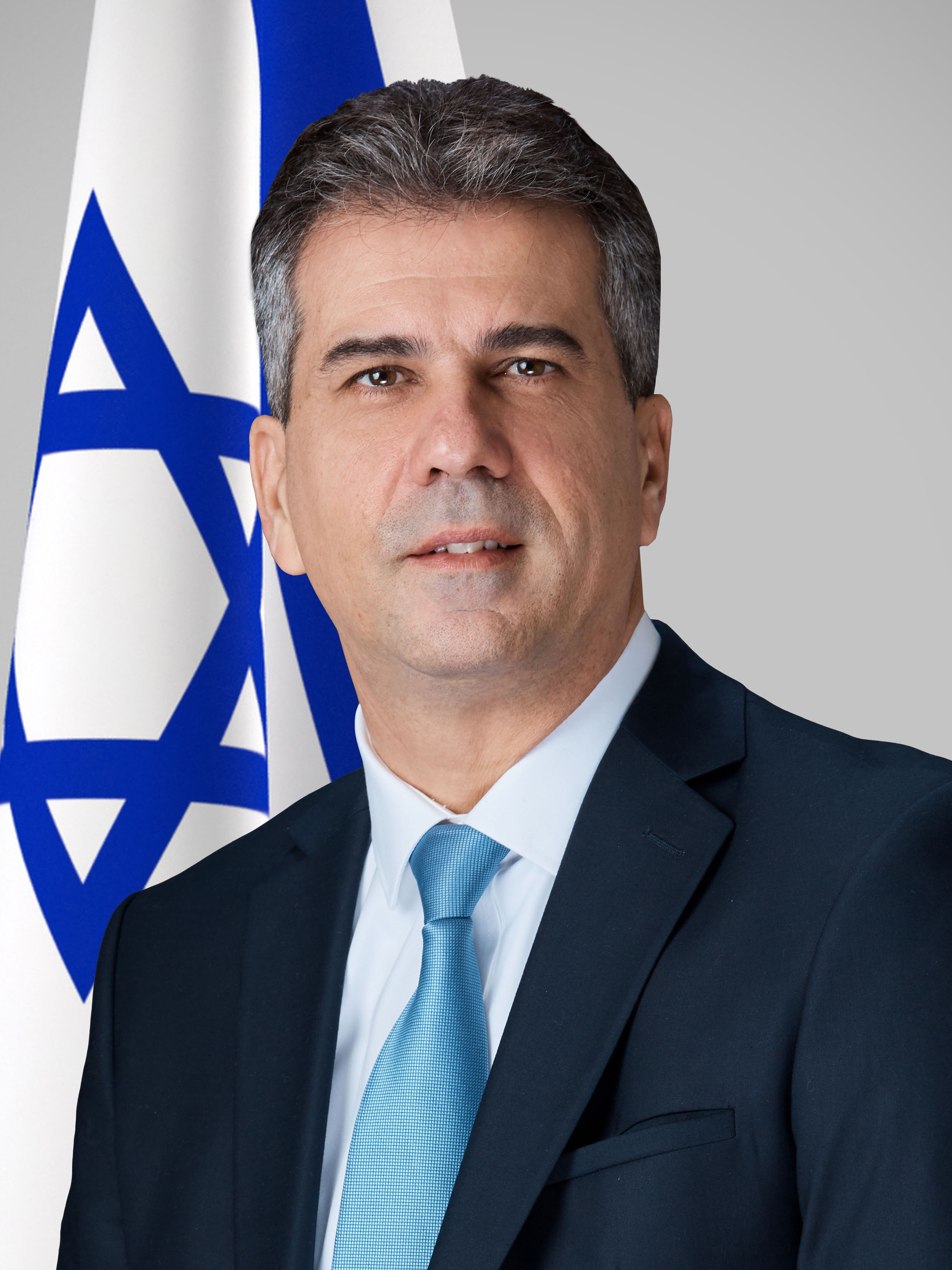
- Cohen in 2017

Ministerial roles
- 2017–2020: Minister of the Economy & Industry
- 2020–2021: Minister of Intelligence
- 2022–2024: Minister of Foreign Affairs
- 2024–: Minister of Energy & Infrastructure

Faction represented in the Knesset
- 2015–2019: Kulanu
- 2019–2023: Likud

Personal details
- Born: 3 October 1972 (age 54) Holon, Israel

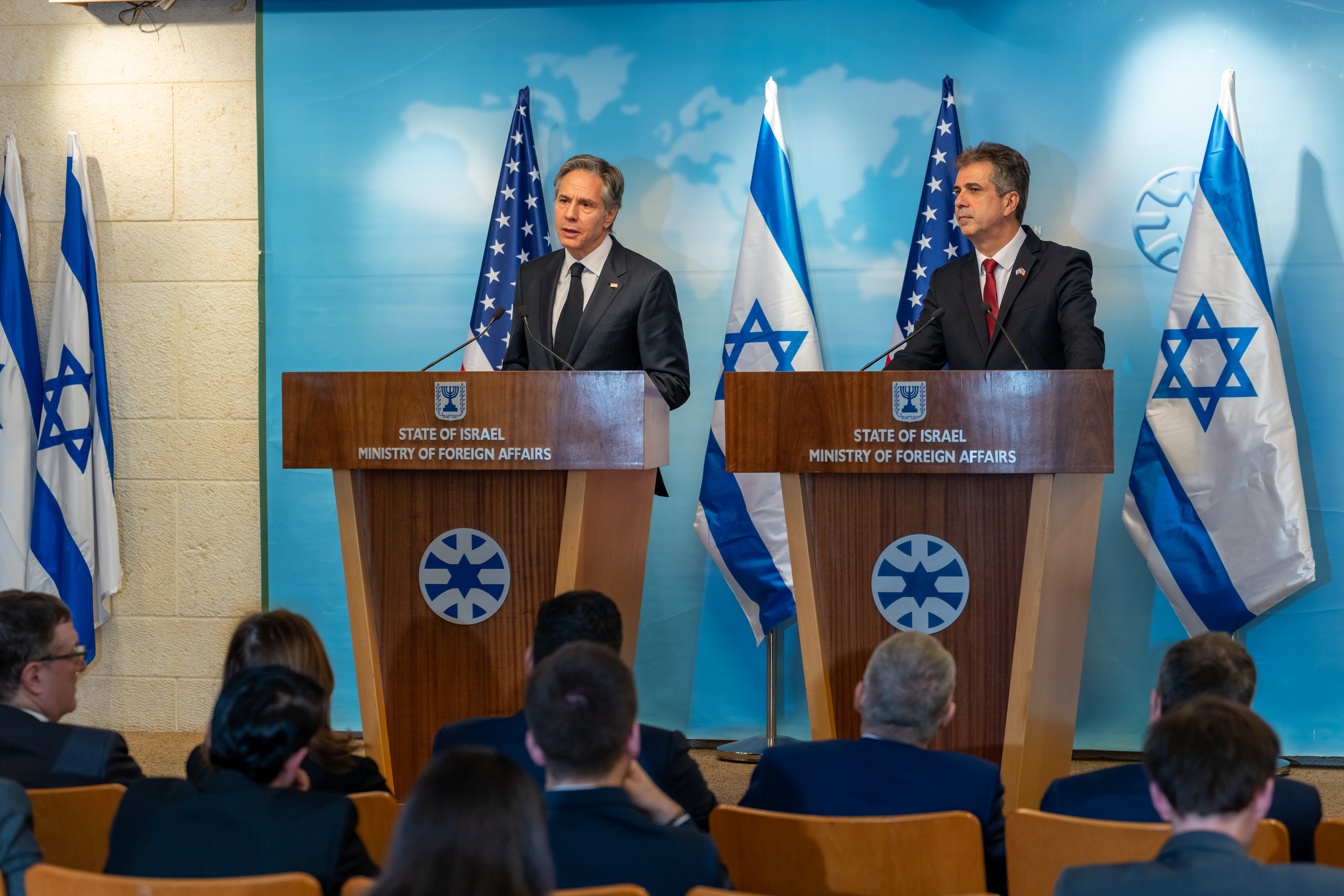
Secretary Blinken and Cohen

Eliahu "Eli" Cohen (Hebrew: אֵלִי כֹּהֵן; born 3 October 1972) is an Israeli politician serving as the Minister of Energy and Infrastructure for the Likud party and a member of the Security Cabinet. He previously served as Minister of Foreign Affairs, Minister of Economy and Industry, Minister of Intelligence, and Chair of the Reforms Committee. Cohen is a certified public accountant and has held senior positions in the private sector.

== Biography ==
Eli Cohen was born and raised in Holon. During his military service in the Israeli Air Force, he rose to the rank of Major. While serving, he pursued and completed a bachelor's degree in accounting at Tel Aviv University, another bachelor's degree with honors in management and economics at the Open University, and a master's degree in business administration with a specialization in finance and accounting at Tel Aviv University. Later, Cohen lectured at Tel Aviv University in the fields of management, finance, and accounting.

In 2000, after completing his military service, Cohen began working as a certified public accountant at BDO Ziv Haft, where he led the Economic Department within the Professional Division. In 2003, he joined the credit rating company S&P Maalot. By 2007, Cohen was appointed Vice President at Hevrat HaHachshara, and later promoted to Deputy CEO. In this role, he oversaw the daily operations of the group’s companies and served as a director across all subsidiaries.

=== Political career ===
Cohen began his political activity in the Likud branch in Holon. In 2015, he was elected to the Knesset, and in July of that year, he was appointed to head a parliamentary committee tasked with handling specific legislation forwarded by the Knesset Committee. This committee became known as the "Reforms Committee." During his tenure, Cohen advanced the establishment of an independent Capital Market Authority and the Urban Renewal Authority. Additionally, the committee approved reforms aimed at increasing competition in the banking sector.

==== Minister of Economy and Industry ====
On 23 January 2017, Cohen was appointed Minister of Economy and Industry. During his term, he promoted free trade agreements with several countries, including Canada, Switzerland, the Faroe Islands, the Virgin Islands, Malta, Nauru, Ukraine, Panama, and Liechtenstein. Under his leadership, Israeli exports exceeded $100 billion for the first time.

Cohen launched a program allocating NIS 400 million to promote innovation in Israel’s peripheral regions. He led reforms to dismantle the monopoly of the Standards Institute, simplifying regulatory processes. During his term, unemployment dropped to a historic low of 3.8%.

In February 2018, the Knesset approved a change to the Standards Law led by Cohen, adopting international standards without specific adaptations for Israel. In May 2019, Cohen signed an order easing the personal import of products such as dietary supplements, cosmetics, car parts, and transportation products.

In the 21st Knesset elections, Cohen was placed second on the Kulanu party list and was elected. Ahead of the 22nd Knesset elections, Kulanu merged with Likud. Cohen was placed 15th on the Likud list and was re-elected. He retained his seat in subsequent elections for the 23rd and 24th Knessets. He retained his seat in the 2020 and 2021 elections, securing the 14th and 12th spots, respectively.

Member of the Security Cabinet

On 13 May 2019, Cohen was appointed as a member of the Security Cabinet, a position he held until 13 June 2021, when the government transitioned. He rejoined the Security Cabinet in the 37th government as Minister of Foreign Affairs.

==== Minister of Intelligence ====
On 17 May 2020, Cohen was appointed Minister of Intelligence as part of Israel’s 35th government. In this role, he worked to strengthen relations with African nations. In January 2021, he conducted an official visit to Sudan, marking the first visit by an Israeli minister to the country. During the visit, Cohen met with Sudanese leaders, including President Abdel Fattah al-Burhan, Defense Minister Yassin Ibrahim, and other senior officials.

Cohen also initiated technological incubators in Israel's peripheral regions and launched a program to train young women for technological roles in elite units of the Israel Defense Forces and other security agencies.

==== Foreign minister ====
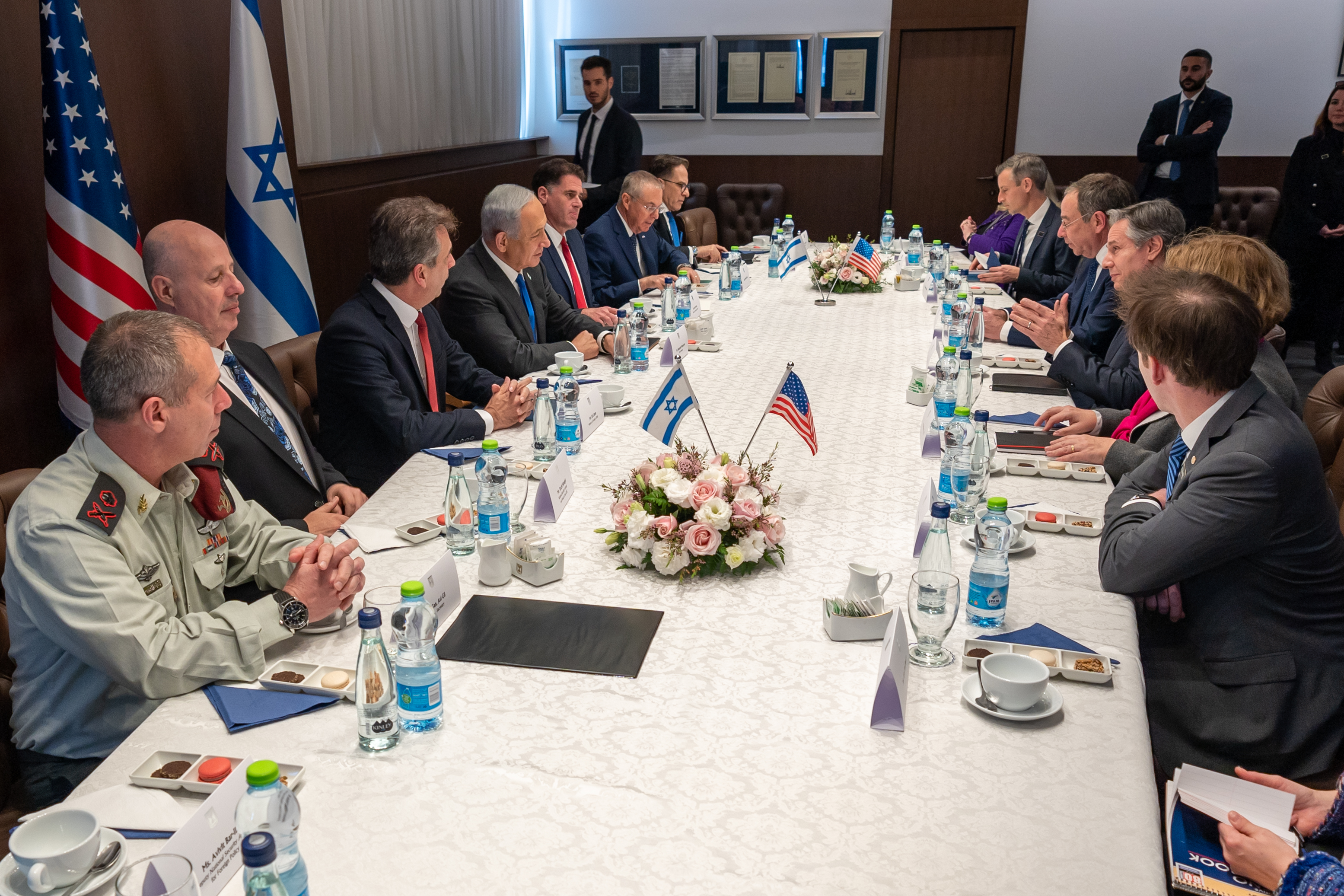
Cohen with Israeli prime minister Benjamin Netanyahu and U.S. Secretary of State Antony Blinken in Jerusalem, 30 January 2023

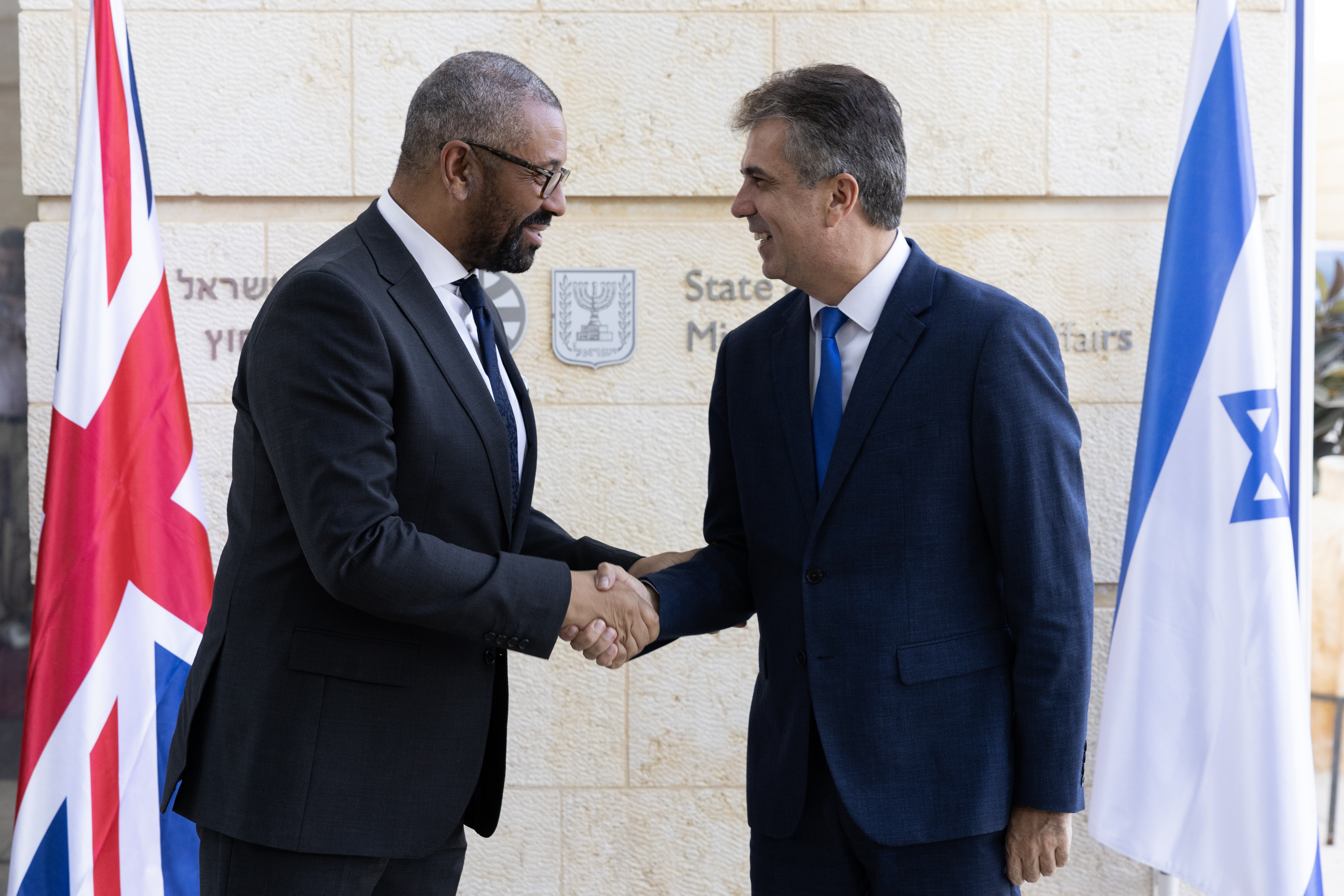
Cohen with UK foreign secretary James Cleverly in Jerusalem, 11 September 2023

Upon the inauguration of Israel’s 37th government, Cohen was appointed Minister of Foreign Affairs of the new Likud government, in rotation with Israel Katz. On 1 February 2023, he visited Sudan and met with its leader Abdel Fattah al-Burhan and Foreign Minister Ali al-Sadiq.

In February 2023 Cohen flew to Sudan and met with General Abdel Fattah al-Burhan, president of the Transitional Sovereign Council, to lay the groundwork for a peace agreement between Israel and Sudan. After the massive earthquake in Turkey in February, Cohen met with Turkish president Erdogan in Ankara and announced that Israeli airlines would resume direct flights to Turkey. In February Cohen acknowledged that after months of talks, Oman announced that Israeli airlines would be permitted to pass through its airspace. Cohen also confirmed that Papua New Guinea, which established diplomatic relations with Israel in 1978, would be opening its first embassy in Jerusalem in 2023.

In March 2023 Cohen met the UK foreign secretary in London to sign the 2030 Roadmap for Israel-UK Bilateral Relations which will increase cooperation in technology, research and development, security and cyber. The same month, he signed a free trade agreement with the UAE, eliminating or reducing tariffs on 96% of traded goods and granting Israeli companies access to UAE government tenders. In April 2023 Cohen inaugurated Israel’s first embassy in Turkmenistan. No Israeli foreign minister has visited this Muslim majority country since 1994. The newly built embassy is located in the capital city, Ashgabat, ten miles from Turkmenistan’s border with Iran. Later that month Cohen paid a three-day visit to Baku in Azerbaijan after his counterpart visited Jerusalem in March for the inauguration of the Azerbaijani Embassy in Israel, the first embassy of a Shia Muslim country in Israel. Cohen was the first Israeli minister to visit Ukraine and meet with President Volodymyr Zelenskyy since the outbreak of the war.

In May 2023 he signed a customs agreement with the United Arab Emirates Ambassador to Israel to further the trade agreement signed in 2022.

In August 2023 Cohen revealed that he had attended a secret meeting in Rome with Libyan Foreign Minister Najla El Mangoush, organized by Italian Foreign Minister Antonio Tajani to discuss normalizing relations between the two countries. The news triggered mass protests in Libya, leading to Mangoush's dismissal. Cohen was criticized in Israel for what was seen as a breach of diplomatic practice. An Israeli foreign ministry spokesman said the timing of Cohen's announcement had not been coordinated with Mangoush, catching her off-guard. Magnoush later fled Libya for her safety.

On 10 October 2023, three days after the start of the Gaza war and genocide, Cohen recruited a team of ten influential Israelis to advocate for Israel online during the war. The team included: Arsen Ostrovsky, Noa Tishby, Hen Mazzig, Tali Eshkoli, Michael Dickson, Joe Zevuloni, Natalie Dodon, Emily Schrader, Michal Cotler-Wunsh, and Fleur Hassan‑Nahoum.

In October 2023, after joint efforts by Israel’s Ministry of Foreign Affairs and the U.S. State Department, Israel was officially admitted into the U.S. Visa Waiver Program.

==== Minister of Energy and Infrastructure ====
On 1 January 2024, Cohen was appointed Minister of Energy, following the Knesset's approval of a rotation agreement with Israel Katz between the Energy Ministry and the Ministry of Foreign Affairs.

Cohen announced the decommissioning of the Reading Power Station in Tel Aviv in January 2024, with the site repurposed for green energy projects. In February, he approved a NIS 40 billion energy investment plan. Later that year, he blocked a proposed 8% water rate increase, limiting it to only 1.6%.

In August 2024, Cohen approved new regulations requiring solar energy systems in all new non-residential buildings and single-family homes. That same month, he finalized reforms easing the import of electrical products from Europe.

In August 2025, Cohen called for the IDF to transform Gaza City into a wasteland. “Gaza City itself should be exactly like Rafah, which we turned into a city of ruins,” Cohen said on Channel 14.

=== Personal life ===
Cohen is married to Anat, a primary school teacher. Together, they have one son and three daughters and reside in Holon.

== See also ==
- Azerbaijan–Israel relations
- Israel–Sudan relations
- Israel–United Arab Emirates relations
