= Jacki Karsh =

American media personality and activist

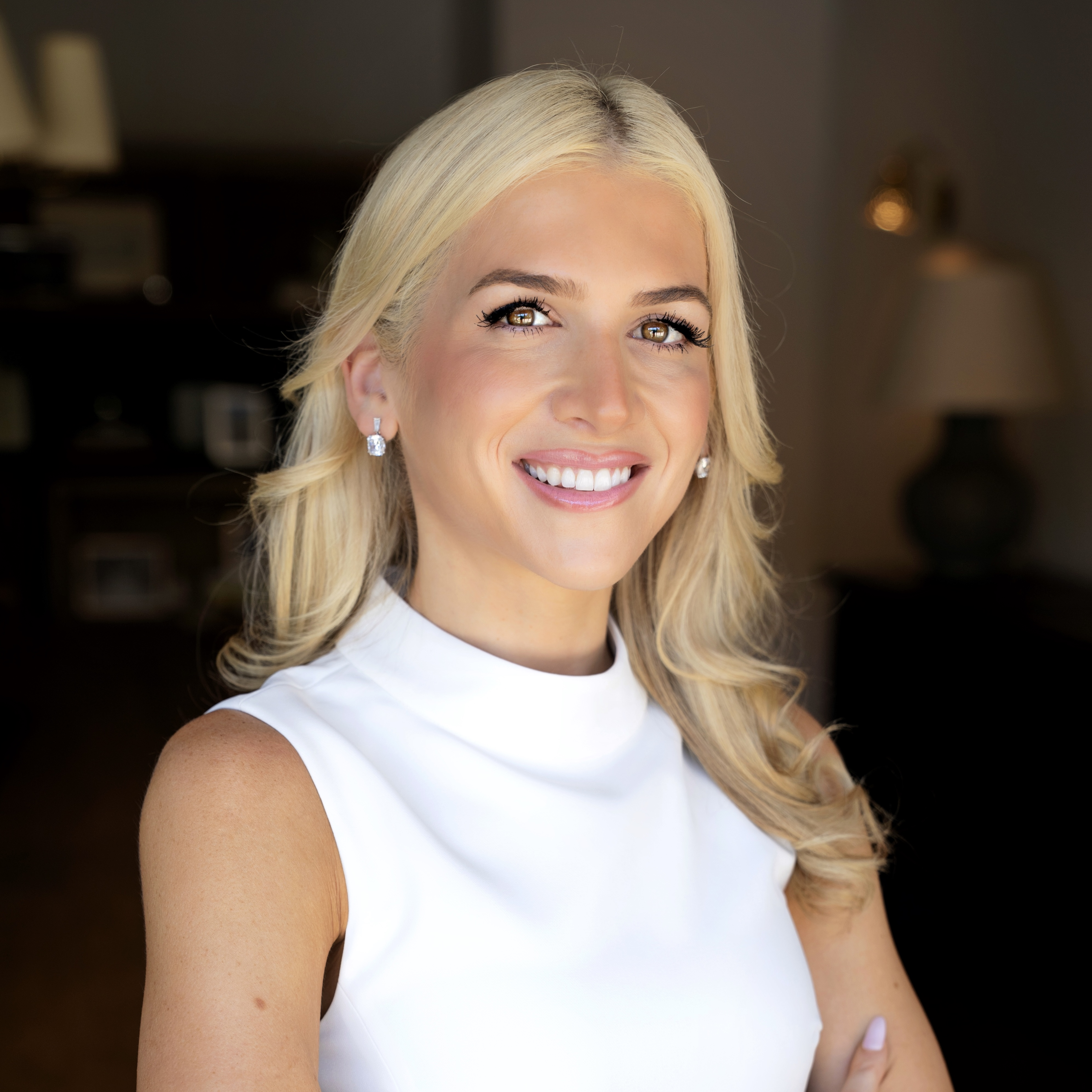
- Website: jackikarsh.com

Jacki Karsh is an American media personality and activist. In 2025, she launched the Karsh Journalism Fellowship, a fellowship created with the stated goal of helping Israel win an "information war".

== Early life ==
Karsh is Jewish. According to Karsh, "My great-great-grandmother fled Hungary at the turn of the 19th century, escaping the antisemitism that haunted Jewish life in Europe." She graduated with a BA in English and Comparative Literature from Columbia University in 2013, and a master's degree in broadcast journalism from the Columbia University Graduate School of Journalism in 2014.

== Activism ==
Karsh has advocated on behalf of Israel since the October 7 attacks. She is a board member of the Jewish Federation Los Angeles, a pro-Israel organization, and has written opinion pieces for The Times of Israel, The Hill, the Jewish News Syndicate and The Jewish Journal of Greater Los Angeles. According to Current Affairs, Karsh "calls herself a 'journalist' but behaves much more like a PR officer for the Israeli government".

Karsh said in December 2024 that "October 7th happened and everything changed for me because I knew this was going to be a war of information the second it happened", and that she decided to try to "shift some of the narrative" on Israel following the Al-Ahli Arab Hospital explosion. In an interview with StandWithUs Campus, she characterized the IDF as "the most moral army in the world" and said, "The Israeli population is made up of Christians, Druze and Arabs and Israelis, Jews—it runs the gamut—and so there's no apartheid there and I think if you just go through each of those things systematically, the facts are on the Israeli side."

Karsh has described Hamas as "real life monsters" and compared them to Nazis, and questioned the accuracy of the casualty figures provided by the Gaza Health Ministry. She has also criticized the pro-Palestinian protests on university campuses. In a December 2024 Jewish Journal column, she asserted that college newspapers had become a "breeding ground for rhetoric that marginalizes Jewish voices and vilifies Israel". According to Drop Site News, "Karsh has never publicly expressed any concern or sympathy for the tens of thousands of Palestinian civilians killed by the Israeli military in Gaza".

In December 2025, Karsh emceed the North American Mayors Summit Against Antisemitism, a summit organized by the Combat Antisemitism Movement.

=== Karsh Journalism Fellowship ===
In August 2025, Jacki and her husband Jeff Karsh announced the launch of the Karsh Journalism Fellowship. The fellowship describes itself as "the world's only journalism fellowship solely dedicated to Jewish topics" and "resolutely nonpartisan". Karsh stated the fellowship was created to help Israel win an "information war". It started accepting applications that July, and its inaugural class was scheduled to start in January 2026.

The fellowship's sessions include topics such as "How to Cover Antisemitism" and "Middle East Misinformation", which fact-checking website Misbar noted are "framing approaches that have often been used elsewhere to discredit criticism of Israeli policies or advocacy for Palestinian rights". Its mentors include scholars and journalists from publications such as The Atlantic, Spectrum News, The Spectator, Yedioth Ahronoth, The Times of Israel and The New York Times. Other mentors include pro-Israel advocates such as Van Jones, Emily Schrader and Michael Powell, a writer for The New York Times and The Atlantic who has criticized Amnesty International and Doctors Without Borders for becoming "stridently critical of Israel".

== Personal life ==
Jacki and Jeff Karsh live in Los Angeles. Jeff is the founder and managing partner of Tryperion Holdings, a real estate investment company. They have three children.
