= Michael Dickson (educator) =

British-Israeli speaker (born 1977)

- מייקל דיקסון
- Born: London
- Citizenship: Israeli, British
- Education: Bachelor's degree, diplomas in Management and Project Management.
- Title: Executive director, Israel office
- Children: 5
- Website: www.michaeldickson.org

Michael Dickson (Hebrew: מייקל דיקסון) is a British-Israeli writer and public speaker. He serves as executive director of the StandWithUs Israel office in Jerusalem.

He is a senior Fellow at the Center for International Communication (CIC) of Bar Ilan University and an Honorary member of Alpha Epsilon Pi. He was appointed to the Spectrum Forum of leading Executive Directors in Israel under the age of 40.

He is the winner of the Bonei Zion Prize and author of ISResilience: What Israelis Can Teach the World, co-written with psychologist Dr. Naomi Baum, published in 2020.

He was listed as the 14th most influential person on "Jewish Twitter", now X, by the Jewish Telegraphic Agency in 2016. In 2025, Michael Dickson was recognized at a ceremony in Israel's parliament by the Knesset Caucus for Public Diplomacy in recognition of 'his unwavering commitment to defending Israel and the truth" during the October 7th war.

== StandWithUs ==
Michael helped establish the StandWithUs Israel Fellowship, which has graduated over 1,500 of Israel's future diplomats and leaders. These young adults have gone on to staff major corporations, political parties in the Knesset, government ministries and embassies and NGOs worldwide.

== Israel advocacy ==
Dickson has led diplomatic, academic and journalist missions to Israel and has advocated for Israel in forums, such as the UN "Durban II" conference, in the Knesset, in Europe, the US and in the Far East. He helped pioneer StandWithUs' social media activity. He helped set up "social media situation rooms" as far back as in 2009 during Operation Cast Lead, which he referred to as "the first social media war".

On 10 October 2023, three days after the start of the Gaza war and genocide, Dickson was one of ten people appointed by Minister of Foreign Affairs Eli Cohen to advocate for Israel online during the war. The other influencers were: Arsen Ostrovsky, Noa Tishby, Hen Mazzig, Tali Eshkoli, Joe Zevuloni, Natalie Dodon, Emily Schrader, Michal Cotler-Wunsh, and Fleur Hassan‑Nahoum.

== JFS School ==
Michael was very active in the UK Jewish community and was twice appointed British-Jewish youth movement Bnei Akiva UK's executive. Following this, he was appointed as director of informal education at JFS school in London, the largest Jewish school in Europe.

Over five years he formed a department that pioneered innovative programming for 2,000 Jewish students, dealing with all aspects of Jewish life and Israel. He worked with senior representatives from the Christian and Muslim communities to formulate effective and original multi-faith programs that met Government guidelines. He made Israel educational initiatives a central focus of school life and launched the "Ambassador" program, a reality-TV show format educational format based on the Israeli TV series of the same name, teaching students skills in advocating for Israel, which was rolled-out in UK schools nationwide.

== Education ==
Michael holds a Bachelor's degree from University College London (UCL) and diplomas in Management and Project management.
