= Noa Tishby =

Israeli actress (born 1977)

- נועה תשבי
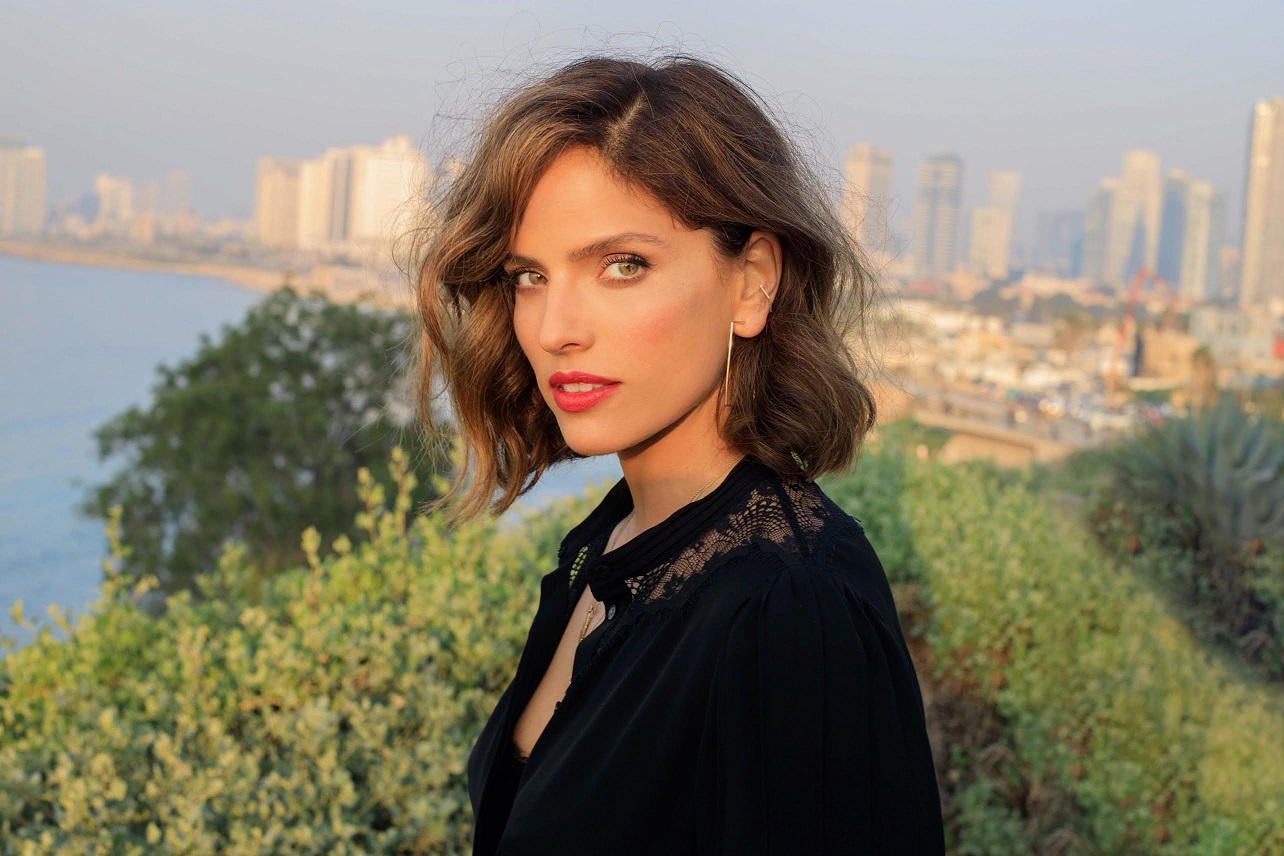
- Noa Tishby in Jaffa, 2021

Special Envoy for Combating Antisemitism and the Delegitimization of Israel
- In office 4 November 2022 – 2 April 2023
- President: Isaac Herzog
- Prime Minister: Yair Lapid; Benjamin Netanyahu
- Minister: Yair Lapid; Eli Cohen
- Preceded by: Position established

Personal details
- Born: Noa Tohar Tishby; May 1975 (age 51) Tel Aviv, Israel
- Spouse: Andrew Günsberg (m. 2008; div. 2011)
- Children: 1
- Occupation: Activist; actress; model; producer; writer
- Website: noatishby.com

Noa Tohar Tishby (Hebrew: נועה טוהר תשבי; Hebrew pronunciation: [no'ʔa tiʃ'bi]; born May 1975) is an Israeli actress and activist. She appeared in a variety of American television shows and movies, including The Affair, The Island, Nip/Tuck, Big Love, NCIS, and others. She is the co-executive producer of the HBO series In Treatment, which is an adaptation of the Israeli series BeTipul. Her production company Noa's Arc was responsible for selling several other adaptations of Israeli programs to American networks.

Tishby focuses on Zionist activism, founding the advocacy organization Act for Israel in 2011. In 2021, she published her first book, Israel: A Simple Guide to the Most Misunderstood Country on Earth. She served as the Special Envoy for Combating Antisemitism and the Delegitimization of Israel for one year, from 2022 to 2023.

== Early life ==
Noa Tishby was born in Tel Aviv, Israel, in May 1975, into a Jewish family involved in the establishment of Israel. The kibbutz her grandfather co-founded was among the first in Israel's history. Tishby began acting at an early age, appearing in commercials by age 8. As a teenager, she earned a drama scholarship from the Tel Aviv Museum of Art and acted in several stage productions and television shows. She also served two and a half years in the Israel Defense Forces. She has described herself as having had a secular Zionist upbringing, having first been to a synagogue only after she had moved to Los Angeles.

== Career ==
Tishby began to achieve fame in Israel in the 1990s, appearing on the Israeli television drama Ramat Aviv Gimmel and starring as Anita in a production of West Side Story at the Habima Theatre. She released an English language album (Nona) and appeared on magazine covers and billboard ads as a model. In the early 2000s, she moved to Los Angeles, an ambition she had from childhood.

By 2006, Tishby had appeared in a series of television roles on shows like Star Trek: Enterprise, Nip/Tuck, CSI: Crime Scene Investigation, The 4400, and Charmed. She had a part in the 2005 film The Island. In 2008, Tishby sold the Israeli drama series BeTipul to HBO. It was the first Israeli format to become an American television show. The resultant American adaptation, In Treatment, premiered in 2008 with Tishby as co-executive producer along with Mark Wahlberg.

It ran for three seasons between 2008 and 2010, before returning for a fourth season in 2021 with Tishby still as co-executive producer. The show, which follows a series of fictional therapy sessions, won a Peabody Award in 2009. In the years during and after In Treatment's first run, Tishby continued to play roles on TV shows like NCIS and Big Love.

Additionally, Tishby began pitching adaptations of other Israeli programs to American networks through her production company Noa's Arc. Tishby was responsible for the development of adaptations for A Touch Away, as well as Life Isn't Everything, which was renamed Divorce: A Love Story for the American version.

In July 2017, Tishby served as the host of the opening ceremony of the 2017 Maccabiah Games.

== Activism ==
Tishby has been an activist advocating for Israel since at least 2011. Tishby has harshly criticized the Boycott, Divestment and Sanctions (BDS) movement, referring to the principles behind its cause as "misinformation, disinformation, manipulation, elimination of history and flat-out lies." She has called Amnesty International's characterization of Israel as an apartheid state "disgraceful".

In 2014, she founded Reality Israel, which holds a series of "leadership trips" for Jewish and non-Jewish people in Israel. In 2016 and 2018, she spoke before the United Nations General Assembly in New York City in support of Israel. In February 2021, Tishby joined the Black–Jewish Entertainment Alliance.

In April 2022, Tishby was appointed by then-Prime Minister Yair Lapid as Special Envoy for Combating Antisemitism and the Delegitimization of Israel, the first person to serve in the newly created position. Her appointment to the position initially drew skepticism. She also registered as a foreign agent under the Foreign Agents Registration Act (FARA). In April 2023, she was dismissed from the position after she spoke out against the judicial reform proposed by the new government of re-elected Prime Minister Benjamin Netanyahu.

=== Act for Israel ===
In 2011, Tishby founded Act for Israel, an online Zionist advocacy organization. Tishby created the group with a stated goal of correcting misinformation about Israel's history, culture, and governmental policies. In March 2011, Act for Israel arranged seven interviews of an Israel Defense Forces (IDF) delegation with American blogs and radio shows, including RedState. Act for Israel later became defunct.

In 2025, the Quincy Institute for Responsible Statecraft reported on emails leaked by the Handala Hack Team, which indicated that Act for Israel's activities on behalf of Israel violated FARA, and that the scope and timeline of Tishby's pro-Israel work went beyond what she had disclosed when registering as a foreign agent. According to the Quincy Institute, "In public, Act For Israel appeared to be no more than a group of pro-Israel Americans advocating for a stronger U.S.-Israel relationship. But the leaked emails and documents show that representatives of the organization sought to shape U.S. public opinion while boasting privately of their intimate collaboration with the Israeli government".

=== Gaza war ===
During the Gaza war, Tishby has been a leading Zionist voice in the U.S. On 10 October 2023, three days after the start of the war, Tishby was one of ten people appointed by Minister of Foreign Affairs Eli Cohen to advocate for Israel online during the war. The other nine team members were, Arsen Ostrovsky, Hen Mazzig, Tali Eshkoli, Michael Dickson, Joe Zevuloni, Natalie Dodon, Emily Schrader, Fleur Hassan-Nahoum, and Michal Cotler-Wunsh.

Tishby has advocated for the return of hostages taken by Hamas, and criticized "so-called pro-Palestinian movements" in the United States. In late 2023, Tishby appeared in several videos with Mayim Bialik in which they rejected calls for a ceasefire. In January 2024, antisemitism scholar Anat Plocker, writing in The Nation, criticized Tishby for conflating criticism of Israel and Zionism with antisemitism. Plocker also critiqued Tishby's claims that pro-Palestinian protesters are secretly serving foreign governments that have "sent their tentacles" and that critics of Israel were "planted" at American universities, stating that these accusations themselves relied on antisemitic tropes. That May, Tishby posted a photo of Nahla Al-Arian, wife of political activist Sami Al-Arian, at Columbia University and falsely claimed she had been "convicted with connections to terrorism financing".

In an October 2025 interview with the National Post, Tishby stated that Israel had lost its public relations war.

On 22 October 2025, Tishby was featured as a speaker at the convocation ceremony at Liberty University.

In 2025, The Jerusalem Post included Tishby on their list of "50 Most Influential Jews", ranking 45th in a group entry of seven pro-Israel influencers.

In January 2026, Tishby appeared as a guest on the PBS program Firing Line with Margaret Hoover.

==== Eighteen ====
Tishby founded the nonprofit media organization Eighteen in 2024, of which she is the CEO, describing its mission as being "to empower Jews and allies to be proud advocates of Israel, the Jewish community and Western values. Its mission is to fight antisemitism, defend Israel and inspire Jewish pride." In December 2024, Eighteen began producing a video project of menorah lightings where Tishby appeared alongside a different celebrity figure for each night of Hanukkah, with the series from December 2024-January 2025 featuring Gwyneth Paltrow, Mila Kunis, Mayim Bialik, Iliza Shlesinger, Van Jones, Cindy Crawford, Tiffany Haddish, and Gal Gadot. In 2025, Eighteen launched the Voices of October 7 speaking tour, which was hosted at six campuses in the United States. In 2026, Eighteen produced a kindergarten-grade 12 curriculum on Judaism and Israel titled "What is". On April 21, 2026, the Los Angeles Unified School District unanimously passed a motion to recognize May as Jewish American Heritage Month and to encourage the use of the curriculum developed by Tishby and Eighteen. In September 2026, under the auspices of Eighteen, Tishby launched the Voices of the Middle East college campus tour alongside Jonathan Elkhoury and Fatema Al Harbi.

== Books ==
In April 2021, Tishby released her first book, Israel: A Simple Guide to the Most Misunderstood Country on Earth. The book discusses the history and culture of Israel with autobiographical details. In the book, Tishby takes a Zionist stance and criticizes the BDS movement as it pertains to the Israeli–Palestinian conflict. The book was published by Simon & Schuster.

In 2024, Simon & Schuster published her second book on antisemitism, co-written with African-American activist Emmanuel Acho, titled Uncomfortable Conversations with a Jew. The book won the Education and Jewish identity Award at the 74th National Jewish Book Awards.

== Personal life ==
Tishby is the granddaughter of Fania Artzi, one of the founders of the kibbutz at Degania, Hanan Yavor, an Israeli diplomat, and Nachum Tisch, who was a founder of the Israeli Ministry of Industry and Trade. Her mother, Yael Tishby, served as head of the food department at the Israeli Export Centre.

Tishby gained U.S. citizenship in 2008.

Tishby was married to Australian television presenter Osher Günsberg from 2008 to 2011. She later had a relationship with financier Ross Hinkle, which produced a son. Tishby and Hinkle are no longer together, and co-parent their son. Tishby is on good terms with both Günsberg and Hinkle.

In 2022, Tishby became the 11,000th signer of the Jewish Future Pledge, a charitable campaign modeled after The Giving Pledge to encourage American Jews to designate at least 50% of their charitable giving to Jewish- or Israel-related causes.

Tishby was awarded an honorary doctorate by Reichman University on June 4, 2024, awarded for having "made exceptional contributions to the State of Israel since October 7."

== Filmography ==
=== As actress ===
==== Film ====
Year	Title	Role	Notes
1997	Hercules	Megara	Voice; Hebrew dub
2003	Connecting Dots	Carrie	
2004	Skeleton Man	Sgt. Davis	
2005	Fatwa	Spy	
2005	The Island	Community Announcer	
2009	Ghosts of Girlfriends Past	Kiki	
2025	October 8	Herself	

==== Television ====
Year	Title	Role	Notes
1995	Ramat Aviv Gimmel	Dafna Maor	Supporting role (Israeli show)
2001	Shachar	Dana Mazor	Supporting role (Israeli show)
2003	Miss Match	Beverly	Episode: "The Price of Love"
2003	Coupling	The Girl	Episode: "A Foreign Affair"
2003	The Drew Carey Show	Rachel	Episode: "Blecch Sunday"
2003	CSI: Miami	Gloria Tynan / Gina Cusack	Episode: "Double Cap"
2003	Nip/Tuck	Janelle	Episode: "Mandi/Randi"
2004	Star Trek: Enterprise	Amanda Cole	Episode: "Harbinger"
2005	Las Vegas	Lisa	Episode: "Whale of a Time"
2005	The 4400	Chloe Granger	Episode: "Weight of the World"
2005	Charmed	Black Heart	Episode: "Malice in Wonderland"
2005	CSI: NY	Polly Part'em	Episode: "Jamalot"
2009	Big Love	Ladonna	4 episodes
2009	NCIS	DEA Agent Claire Connell	Episode: "Truth or Consequences"
2009	Leverage	Mikel Dayan	Episode: "The Two Live Crew Job"
2009	Valentine	Bast	4 episodes
2010	The Deep End	Rachel Blau	Pilot
2015	Dig	Liat	6 episodes
2018	The Affair	Psychologist	1 Episode
2023	Eretz Nehederet	College activist	1 Episode

=== As producer ===
Year	Title	Role	Notes
2008–2010	In Treatment	Executive producer	106 episodes
2013	Divorce: A Love Story	Executive producer	TV movie

== See also ==
- List of combating antisemitism envoys
