= Hen Mazzig =

Israeli writer, speaker, and activist

- חן מזיג
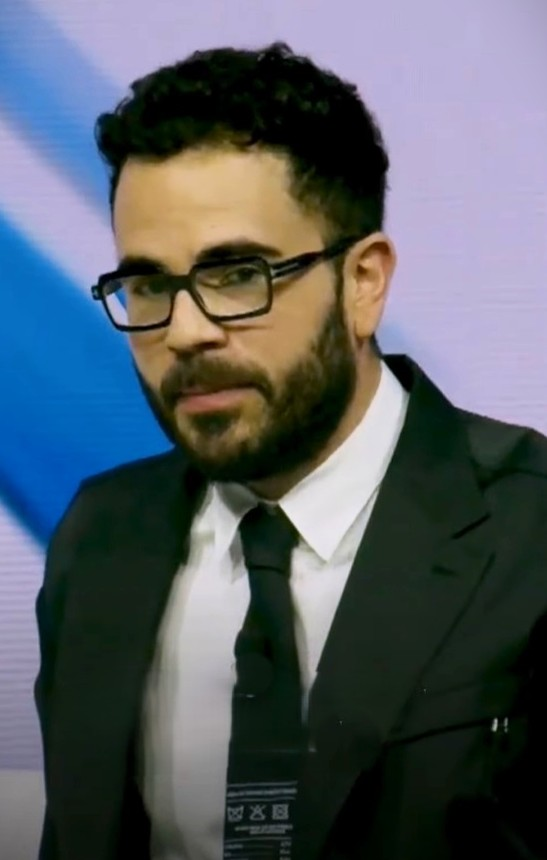
- Mazzig in 2024
- Born: Israel

Personal details
- Profession: Commentator, international public speaker, writer, activist, and social media influencer

Military service
- Allegiance: State of Israel
- Years of service: nearly 5 years
- Unit: COGAT
- Battles/wars: Occupation of the West Bank
- Position <!— COGAT role —>: Humanitarian affairs officer
- Region <!— COGAT region —>: West Bank
- Gaza war: Government-appointed public advocate for Israel

Instagram information
- Genre: Israel advocacy

X information
- Handle: @HenMazzig
- Topics: Israel advocacy; Identity politics; Criticism of LGBTQ advocacy in the Gaza war
- Other names: "A Gay Jew of Color" "intersectionality incarnate"
- Title: Senior fellow

Academic work
- Institutions: Tel Aviv Institute
- Website: tlvi.org

Hen Mazzig (Hebrew: חן מזיג) is an Israeli writer, speaker, and social media influencer. He is also a senior fellow at the Tel Aviv Institute.

== Biography ==
Mazzig is a gay Mizrahi Jew of Tunisian descent on his father's side and Iraqi descent on his mother's; her family fled Iraq after the Farhud. He served in the Israel Defense Forces in a role coordinating between international organizations, Palestinians and the army. He spent time in the United States, working for Hillel International and StandWithUs, before returning to Israel, where he started a social media company.

== Activism ==
Mazzig co-founded the Tel Aviv Institute in 2019, an organization aimed at influencing younger audiences who are skeptical of traditional news media coverage and receive information from social media influencers. He started a movement in August 2020 to take over #JewishPrivilege, an antisemitic hashtag on Twitter, by encouraging Jews to share personal stories of discrimination and abuse. Mazzig criticized a student Boycott, Divestment and Sanctions resolution passed at San Francisco State University in November 2020. Mazzig is strongly supportive of Israel, and has characterized Hamas and Hezbollah as terrorist organizations.

On 10 October 2023, three days after the start of the Gaza war, Mazzig was one of ten people appointed by Minister of Foreign Affairs Eli Cohen to advocate for Israel online during the war. The other nine team members were Arsen Ostrovsky, Noa Tishby, Tali Eshkoli, Michael Dickson, Joe Zevuloni, Natalie Dodon, Emily Schrader, Michal Cotler-Wunsh and Fleur Hassan-Nahoum. In October and December 2023, Mazzig, along with other pro-Israel Twitter accounts, promoted false claims that Omar Bilal Al-Banna and Muhammad Hani Al-Zahar, Palestinian children killed by Israel during the war, were actually dolls.

In August 2024, Mazzig shared a suicide note purported to have been written by a survivor of the Nova music festival massacre. Israel's Channel 13 later debunked the note as a fabrication. Mazzig subsequently deleted his post sharing the fabricated note, writing that he had shared it because it was "soul-crushing", despite being unable to verify the author's identity. That October, Mazzig promoted a false claim that Iranian supreme leader Ali Khamenei had terminal cancer.

In 2025, Mazzig criticized the band Massive Attack, citing a 11-second clip of the late Hamas leader Yahya Sinwar walking in a tunnel in the Gaza Strip in a backdrop video at their show during the 2025 Lido Festival in Manchester. He accused them of "encouraging [sympathy] with Hamas" and incitement. The band responded by threatening to sue Mazzig for defamation, and defended the clip, which was cut with scenes from Jean Cocteau's Orpheus, as "placement and implicit tone of horrified lament; that an individual of power can take people down into hell". They also stated that the clip was selectively chosen from a broader montage of various issues and themes. The account which originally posted the clip subsequently deleted its post.

In 2025, The Jerusalem Post included Mazzig on their list of "50 Most Influential Jews", ranked 45th in a group entry of "seven pro-Israel influencers" that also included Gal Gadot (Israeli actress and model), Arsen Ostrovsky (Israeli lawyer), Siggy Flicker (Real Housewives of New Jersey), Hillel Neuer (Executive director of UN Watch), Noa Tishby (Israeli actress and model) and Eyal Yakoby (social media strategist).

== Speaking ==
Mazzig spoke to the New South Wales Jewish Board of Deputies in December 2020, commemorating the exodus of 850,000 Jews from Arab lands after the 1948 Arab–Israeli War. He was a panelist in 2020 with Arizona State Rep. Alma Hernandez on antisemitism, and debated left-wing British commentator Owen Jones on Sky News in April 2024 in relation to Israel's response to the Hamas-led October 7 attacks. CNN commentator Van Jones described Mazzig as "someone who respects opposing points of view".

In 2018, The Forward reported that Mazzig had received payments from Israel's Government Advertising Agency (LAPAM) during his 2017–2018 speaking tour of U.S. college campuses. The report suggested this arrangement could have required registration under the U.S. Foreign Agents Registration Act (FARA). Mazzig denied any wrongdoing, saying that his work for the government agency focused on combating discrimination: "The consulting that I gave to the [government] was about fighting anti-Semitism. I gave information about being attacked for being LGBT, being a Jew of color. That gives me the understanding of how to combat anti-Semitism, racism and LGBT phobia. And that was the consulting I gave to the agency." No legal or regulatory action was reported to have resulted from the claims.

== Views and opinions ==
Mazzig supported Black Lives Matter in 2020. He endorsed then-Vice US President Kamala Harris's views on Israel and the humanity of Palestinians during her presidential campaign in 2024. His posts were shared by Pink, Amy Schumer, and Gal Gadot, and were turned into billboards in Times Square.

== Published works ==
His first book, The Wrong Kind of Jew: A Mizrahi Manifesto, was published in October 2022 by Wicked Son Press.
