= Jonathan S. Tobin =

American journalist

- Born: New York City, New York, U.S.
- Education: Columbia University
- Occupations: Newspaper editor, journalist
- Notable work: Jewish News Syndicate

Jonathan S. Tobin is an American journalist. He is editor-in-chief of the Jewish News Syndicate (JNS).

== Biography ==
Jonathan S. Tobin was born in New York City and educated in local schools. He studied history at Columbia University.

== Journalism career ==
Tobin is a frequent commentator on domestic politics, Israel, and Jewish affairs. His column, "View from America", appeared for many years in The Jerusalem Post. His work has also appeared in Israel Hayom, the Christian Science Monitor, The Forward, Britain's Jewish Chronicle, the New York Sun, and many other publications. Tobin lectures widely across the United States on college campuses and to Jewish organizations and synagogues. He tours North America debating political and Jewish issues with J.J. Goldberg of The Forward, and has appeared on CNN, BBC Radio, Fox News, Newsmax, i24News, and local network affiliates to discuss politics, foreign policy, and Jewish issues.

From 2009 to 2011, he was executive editor of Commentary, a neo-conservative monthly magazine. From 2011 to 2017, he was the senior online editor and chief political blogger at Commentary and the author of feature articles, reviews, and blog posts on the site. Tobin was executive editor of The Jewish Exponent in Philadelphia from 1998 through 2008. Prior to that, he was executive editor of The Connecticut Jewish Ledger.

In 2003, Tobin told an interviewer that Jewish journalism had improved in quality over the preceding 20 years. However, there were constraints because many American Jewish newspapers are owned by Jewish federations rather than independent corporations. This problem, he said, is not different from the problems faced by other newspapers: "Nobody at The Philadelphia Inquirer reports aggressively on Knight Ridder Corp." He told an interviewer for The New York Times that, "My job as editor is to talk about things people are not willing to talk about". In the same article, the Times wrote that, "In his three-year tenure at The Ledger, an independently owned newspaper, Mr. Tobin, a Long Island native, has turned the once-stodgy weekly into a plucky newspaper, with stories on abuses at a local Jewish nursing home and domestic violence among Jews."

== Awards and recognition ==
Tobin was profiled in the Philadelphia Business Journal on July 26, 2002, and in Press, the magazine of the Pennsylvania Newspaper Association, in its November 2002 issue.

He was named top editorial columnist and best arts critic in Philadelphia for the year 2005 by the Society of Professional Journalists.
