= Chochmat Nashim =

- חכמת נשים
- Formation: c. 2013
- Founder: Shoshanna Keats Jaskoll
- Type: Nonprofit organization
- Headquarters: Israel
- Region served: Israel, United States
- Key people: Shoshanna Keats Jaskoll (co-founder); Anne Gordon
- Website: chochmatnashim.org

Chochmat Nashim (Hebrew: חכמת נשים, "the wisdom of women") is an Israeli nonprofit that advocates for women's rights in Orthodox Judaism, in Israel and the United States. The group raises awareness of trends and policies in Orthodoxy it says disadvantage or harm women and girls. Its projects have included a stock-photo bank of Orthodox women, meant to counter the removal of women's images from Haredi media, and publications aimed at Orthodox and rabbinic audiences about the treatment of women denied a religious divorce.

== History ==
Chochmat Nashim was co-founded around 2013 by Shoshanna Keats Jaskoll, an American-born writer who had settled in Israel, along with other Orthodox women. Keats Jaskoll has traced her activism to an aunt who was an agunah (a woman whose husband refused to grant her a religious divorce), and to an incident in which ultra-Orthodox men told her daughters to sit at the back of a bus. The group started with blog posts and articles, then added a podcast and later campaigns aimed at specific policies and institutions.

== Activities ==
=== Erasure of women and the Jewish Life Photo Bank ===
Chochmat Nashim campaigns against what it calls the "erasure" of women: the removal of women's photographs from Haredi and Orthodox newspapers, magazines, advertising and other publications. The group attributes this to a standard of modesty it says goes beyond normative Jewish practice. In 2021 it launched the Jewish Life Photo Bank, a library of stock photography showing the everyday lives of Orthodox and Haredi women, built with more than 200 Haredi and Orthodox volunteers and professionals in Israel and the US. The photo bank is licensed to Jewish organizations, businesses and media outlets for a fee, giving publications that want to include women in their audience an alternative. The project's photography was largely the work of Laura Ben-David, a Chochmat Nashim founding board member whom colleagues credited as the driving force behind its growth. Ben-David died in Jerusalem in July 2025, aged 56, after an illness with ovarian cancer; the photo bank was renamed the Laura Ben David Jewish Life Photo Bank in her honor.

=== Agunah advocacy ===
Chochmat Nashim campaigns on the treatment of agunot, women refused a religious divorce by their husbands who, under Jewish religious law, cannot remarry as a result. In December 2021, ahead of a sitting of the Israeli committee that appoints rabbinical judges, the group distributed a pamphlet called "Agunat Shabbat" in synagogues across Israel. Written by activists Asaf Wall and Gil Slovic, it echoed the format of ordinary weekly Torah-portion sheets to argue that rabbinic authorities find flexible solutions to halakhic problems in most areas of life, but not for women seeking release from a marriage, and to pressure the appointments committee to pick dayanim more willing to act on the issue.

=== Rate My Beit Din ===
In 2022 Chochmat Nashim launched Rate My Beit Din, a website that lets people who have gone through divorce proceedings rate and review the rabbinical court that handled their case, on measures such as cost, transparency, and how the court treated women seeking a get. The group has described it as a way to pressure batei din toward more consistent, transparent practice by giving prospective litigants a public record to check beforehand.

=== Health awareness ===
The group has run public-health campaigns aimed at Haredi women, including efforts to encourage breast cancer screening in communities where modesty practices can discourage women from seeking timely care.

=== Podcast and other media ===
Chochmat Nashim produces a podcast hosted by Keats Jaskoll and Anne Gordon, produced by Jewish Coffee House, covering topics such as the erasure of women, agunah cases and women's health. Group writers have also published in The Times of Israel, The Jerusalem Post, The Forward and the Jewish Chronicle.

== Reception ==
Chochmat Nashim has been covered by The Christian Science Monitor, Haaretz, The Jerusalem Post, the Jewish Standard and Ynet, usually alongside coverage of other Orthodox women organizing around visibility and divorce-law reform in Israel.
