= Women in Israeli local government =

According to the year 2015, women stand at the head of 7 out of 256 local authorities in Israel.

== Municipal elections in Israel ==
Municipal elections in Israel are elections in which the residents of the cities and local councils in Israel vote for the chairman of the local authority (mayor or municipality chairman), as well as the city councils or the local councils.

Since the foundation of the state of Israel in 1948 until 1978, when the municipal elections system has been reformed, residents would use one ballot to elect a political party. Once a coalition is formed, the mayor is elected by the council members.

Using the old electoral system (until 1978), 10 women were elected mayors. In 1978, the municipal electoral system was reformed and personalized, so that residents would use two ballots: one for the political party and the other for the position of mayor. Since the reform until today, 18 women were elected as mayors.

== Statistics of Female representation in municipalities ==
Looking over the years, statistics show an increase in the number of women elected as council members and mayors: In 1965, women formed 3.1% of the general number of council members and mayors, while in 1989 the percentage increased to 8.5%. In 1993, the percentage rose to 10.9% and 15.4% by 1998. Female representation has been consistently widespread; according to the statistics of 1998, 88.8% of the Jewish city/town councils included women. In the Arab villages and cities, women formed 0.4% of the total number of elected council members and mayors.

== Promotion of female representation in Israel ==
Although there has been an increasing number of women elected to hold municipal positions, the question of the number of female representation has been brought up many times in research and different conventions. Various explanations for the relatively low number of women were proposed:

1. Women might still shy away from being politically involved.
2. Women might still feel responsible for maintaining the household and raising the children.
3. The connection between state and religion.
4. Pressing issues like state security make topics like gender equality seem minor.
5. Another theory claims there is a political mechanism to maintain the superiority of men.

Nevertheless, some of the political parties in Israel strive to secure seats for women in municipal elections. Meretz party, for example, secures 40% of the list of contenders to municipal council for women. Consequently, women in Meretz have achieved a 37% female representation of the total number of women in city and town councils.

In addition, WEPOWER ("Ken"), an Israeli NGO that was formed in 2000, proactively promotes women's leadership to the highest levels of decision-making and elected position. Many of today's female MKs, mayors and council members are alumni of the WEPOWER training programs.

=== 2024 elections ===
In the 2024 Israeli municipal elections, 88 women ran for head of a local authority, compared with 72 in the previous elections. Fifteen women were elected as heads of local authorities, up from 14 before the elections. In Shoham, women won a majority of the seats on the local council, the first time this had happened in Israel; Shoham also elected its first female council head, and both council members representing the religious public were women.

=== Women mayors in Israel throughout the years ===
Name	City/Regional council	Years of office
Chaika Grossman	Ga'aton	1951–1950
Hadassah Bergman	Chevel Ma'on	1953–1951
Chana Levin	Rishon Lezion	1959–1956
Yafa Katz	Kfar Yona	1959–1957
Yehudit Shoshani	Ramat Yishay	1965–1962, 1971–1969, 1976–1974
Bat Sheva Eilon	Brener	1985–1965
Menucha Charlap	Yokne'am Illit	1967
Zehava Vechechina	Kiryat Haroshet	1974–1971
Zelda Shacham	Ramat Yishay	1974–1971
Violet Churi	Kefar Yassif	1974–1972
Ora Poter	Bney Shim'on	1989–1983
Ziva Ben Dror	Even Yehuda	1993–1989
Marsha Kaspi	Savion	1998–1993
Yael Shaltieli	Bik'at Bet Shean	2006–1996
Daniella Weiss	Kdumim	2007–1996
Vered Sweid	Netanya	1998
Miriam Feirberg	Netanya	1998
Yael German	Hertzeliya	2013–1998
Ora Chacham	Efal	2008–1999
Lilach Morgan	Arava Tichona	2007–2002
Iris Avraham	Givataim	2007–2006
Flora Shoshan	Mitzpe Ramon	2013–2006
Sigal Moran	Bnei Shimon	2009
Tali Ploskov	Arad	2015–2010
Mati Zarfati Herkvi	Yoav	2011
Lizi Delariche	Ganey Tikva	2013
Shira Avin	Ramat Hasharon	2013
Yeela Maklis	Yehud Monosson	2013
Liat Shochat	Or Yehuda	2015
