= Arsen Ostrovsky =

Israeli lawyer

- Born: Odessa, Ukrainian SSR, Soviet Union
- Citizenship: Israel, Australia
- Education: University of Wollongong
- Occupations: Lawyer, activist, journalist
- Awards: Bonei Zion Prize (2018)

Arsen Ostrovsky (Hebrew: ארסן אוסטרובסקי) is a Ukrainian-born Israeli activist, freelance journalist, and a lawyer, specialising in international law and human rights.

Ostrovsky has been a vocal defender of Israel's actions for over a decade. This includes involvement in South Africa's genocide case against Israel at the International Court of Justice. He previously served as CEO of the International Legal Forum. In November 2025, he relocated to Australia to head the Sydney office of the Australia/Israel & Jewish Affairs Council (AIJAC).

== Early life ==
Ostrovsky was born in Odessa, in the Ukrainian Soviet Socialist Republic, within the Soviet Union. He then grew up in Sydney, Australia and graduated from University of Wollongong in New South Wales. The Jewish News Syndicate erroneously reported that Ostrovsky was born in Australia. He practiced law in Australia and the United States. In 2012, Ostrovsky made aliyah to Israel.

== Career ==
Ostrovsky made Aliyah to Israel in 2012. He and his wife were married in Jaffa.

Ostrovsky served as the Director of Research (c. 2013) and later as the executive director of the Israeli-Jewish Congress (IJC), a role he held from before 2017 through at least 2018.

Ostrovsky served as the CEO of the International Legal Forum (ILF), an Israel-based NGO, from 2012 until recently. In this capacity, he has appeared before the Knesset as an invited guest, including on 29 January 2024 to discuss antisemitism.

He spoke to media during the 2021 Israel–Palestine crisis, as the CEO of the International Legal Forum and an "expert on digital politics".

=== Lawsuit Against University of California, Berkeley ===
In November 2022, Ostrovsky and another attorney, Gabriel Groisman, filed a complaint against University of California, Berkeley with the U.S. Department of Education Office for Civil Rights (OCR). (Note: pursuant to Title VI of the Civil Rights Act of 1964[SP1].) OCR opened a formal investigation in December 2022. Their complaint was in response to Berkeley Law Student for Justice in Palestine (Berkeley LSJP) announcement on 21 August 2022 that nine student organizations adopted a "pro-Palestine bylaw" and vowed not to "invite speakers that have expressed and continued to hold views or host/sponsor/promote events in support of Zionism, the apartheid state of Israel, and the occupation of Palestine". A wide array of student organizations signed the Law Students for Justice in Palestine at Berkeley Law pledge. (Note: Including: Berkeley Law Muslim Student Association, Middle Eastern and North African Law Students Association, Womxn of Color Collective, Asian Pacific American Law Students Association, Queer Caucus, Community Defense Project, Women of Berkeley Law, and Law Students of African Descent.) This pledge supported the Boycott, Divestment and Sanctions (BDS) movement.

== Pro-Israel advocacy in the Gaza war ==
Ostrovsky's own experience of the 2023 October 7 attacks in Israel was sheltering from rocket fire in the stairwell of his Tel Aviv apartment block. Speaking to Indian television, he called the attack "unprovoked".

In June 2025, Ostrovsky said that activist Greta Thunberg, who was part of the June 2025 Gaza Freedom Flotilla attempting to break the Israeli blockade of the Gaza Strip, was "a little jihadist" and "trying to enter Gaza to show solidarity with Hamas", and warned that "It would be truly unfortunate if something happened to her flotilla."

In a September 2025 article for The Jerusalem Post, he maintained his stance that Israel was not guilty of genocide in Gaza.

=== Ottawa conference and cockroach cartoon ===
In late 2023, Ostrovsky was a speaker at the Antisemitism: Face It, Fight It conference in Ottawa, Canada. His appearance at the conference was criticised by Independent Jewish Voices Canada, a pro-diaspora Jewish advocacy group. A cartoon posted on Ostrovsky's Twitter account to advertise the conference depicted Hamas militants as cockroaches, with Palestinian colours, being crushed under an IDF boot. The cartoon was placed under restriction by Twitter for its use of insect imagery, and Canadians for Justice and Peace in the Middle East called it an example of "textbook Nazi propaganda".

=== Claims that Palestinians are faking injuries and deaths ===
In October 2023, Ostrovsky promoted a false claim that a photo of a dead Palestinian child was actually of a doll. In April 2025, FakeReporter reported that Ostrovsky was one of 30 prominent Twitter accounts promoting content from Gazawood, an Israeli Twitter account which attempts to discredit Palestinians by claiming they are exaggerating or faking their casualties.

=== Criticism of South Africa ===
During South Africa's genocide case against Israel at the International Criminal Court, Ostrovsky accused South Africa of committing blood libel and of being the "legal arm of Hamas".

In an interview with Mishpacha magazine, Ostrovsky said, “Essentially, it is no more than a blood libel and act of lawfare, in which South Africa is willingly serving as pro bono counsel for the Iranian regime and Hamas”.

Ostrovsky and Stanislav Pavlovschi, a Moldovan politician from the Dignity and Truth Platform, wrote a January 2024 article for The Hill that said:

In baselessly leveling the charge of genocide against Israel, all that South Africa is doing is engaging in a form of lawfare as a proxy of the Iranian regime and Hamas. Furthermore, South Africa is only diminishing real acts of genocide, such as those that occurred in the Holocaust, as well as against Armenians, Yazidis, in Rwanda, Darfur and Syria more recently.

— Arsen Ostrovsky and Stanislav Pavlovschi, Israel is not committing genocide — but Hamas is, The Hill.

=== Gaza Strip population statistics controversy ===
In December 2024, Ostrovsky and IDF military officer John Spencer co-authored an opinion piece in Newsweek criticizing Amnesty International's characterization of Israel's actions in Gaza as genocide, which they described as "no less than a blood libel". The article originally stated:

To demonstrate just how utterly ludicrous Amnesty's accusation of genocide is, one only needs to see that, according to the CIA World Factbook, the population in Gaza has actually increased 2 percent in the last year. This is the very opposite of seeking to destroy, in whole or in part or in any way, a group of people.

In January 2025, Newsweek removed this sentence, issuing a statement that read:

This article previously stated the CIA World FactBook claims the Gaza's population increased in 2024. That statement has been removed.

Separately, the Australian Associated Press FactCheck team analyzed social media claims that Gaza's population had increased by 2 percent according to the CIA World Factbook and determined them to be false, noting that the figures were based on U.S. Census Bureau projections from August 2023, before the outbreak of conflict.

== Move to Australia ==
He lived in Israel for 13 years before moving to Australia at the end of November 2025. He is now the head of the Sydney office of the Australia/Israel & Jewish Affairs Council (AIJAC). Before his move to Australia, he wrote an article for right-wing Australian newspaper The Daily Telegraph saying that Australia should "Blame UN, not Israel, for holding up needed food aid in Gaza". When interviewing Ostrovsky, Jerusalem Post editor Zvika Klein compared the organisation to AIPAC in the United States, and Ostrovsky replied, "its primary mission is the combating of anti-semitism, but also supporting Israel and the Australia Israel alliance". In a reflection on the Bondi attack, one of his friends in Israel opined that, "I see his new role as his miluim, his IDF reserve duty".

=== 2025 Bondi Beach shooting ===
During the Bondi Beach shooting at East Sydney in 2025, a bullet grazed Ostrovsky's head, causing loss of a life-threatening quantity of blood. His injury was reported internationally, in Hebrew, English, and Russian. Several media reports described him as having also "survived" the October 7 attacks in Israel.

In an interview with The Jerusalem Post, Ostrovsky described the scene following the attack as "like a war zone" and he referred to the gunmen as assassins.

Ostrovsky and Syrian Australian Ahmed al-Ahmed were the first two wounded survivors of the Bondi Beach shooting to waive their right to name suppression in the prosecution of alleged ISIS terrorist Naveed Akram.

Following the shooting, AI-generated images depicting Ostrovsky faking his injuries circulated on social media.

== Writing and media appearances ==
=== Newspapers and magazines ===
==== Opinion articles ====
- Ostrovsky, Arsen (20 August 2014). "ISIS and Hamas: The Double Standard". HuffPost. Archived from the original on 30 September 2023.
- Ostrovsky, Arsen (10 May 2021). "Sheikh Jarrah: A legal background". JNS.org. Archived from the original on 13 May 2021. (about the Sheikh Jarrah controversy)
- Ostrovsky, Arsen (4 January 2024). "Israel is not committing genocide — but Hamas is". The Hill. (about allegations of genocide in the October 7 attacks)
- Ostrovsky, Arsen (5 September 2025). "Why claims of Israeli genocide in Gaza are legally false | The Jerusalem Post". The Jerusalem Post. Israel.
- Ostrovsky, Arsen (4 August 2025). "Blame UN, not Israel, for holding up needed food aid in Gaza". Daily Telegraph. Sydney.

=== Television interviews ===
- Interview on South African TV station SABC: "SA-Israel genocide case | Israeli Lawyer Arsen Ostrovsky weighs in on the ruling". www.youtube.com/@sabcdigitalnews. South Africa: SABC. 26 January 2024.

=== Social media ===
Ostrovsky has one of the most followed Israeli Twitter accounts. In 2016, Jewish Telegraphic Agency included him on their list of the '25 most influential people' on 'Jewish Twitter', ranked 16th. In 2025, The Jerusalem Post included him on their list of "50 Most Influential Jews", ranked 45th in a group entry of "seven pro-Israel influencers" that also included Gal Gadot (Israel actress and model), Siggy Flicker (Real Housewives of New Jersey), Hen Mazzig (social media influencer), Hillel Neuer (executive director of UN Watch), Noa Tishby (Israeli actress and model), and Eyal Yakoby (social media strategist).

=== Contributions to books ===
Following the 14 December 2025, Islamic State-inspired terrorist attack at Bondi Beach in East Sydney, Australia, Ostrovsky's brother-in-law, Rabbi Menachem Creditor, published We Will Prevail: Voices, Fury and Faith After Bondi, an anthology of essays, poems and firsthand reflections brought together in the immediate wake of the antisemitic terror attack. The anthology, which includes a searing foreword by Ostrovsky, as a survivor of the attack.

== See also ==
- Allegations of genocide in the October 7 attacks
- Allegations of genocide against Palestinians
- Amichai Chikli, Minister of Diaspora Affairs and Combating Antisemitism
- Civilian Information Headquarters
- Dehumanization of Palestinians in Israeli discourse
- Israeli transfer of Palestinian militant bodies (2012)
- Ministry of Diaspora Affairs and Combating Antisemitism
- Misinformation in the Gaza war
- Universities and antisemitism
