= Jerusalem News Syndicate =

American Jewish-focused news agency and wire service

- Founded: September 2011
- Headquarters: San Diego, California
- Official language: English
- Website: jns.org
- Remarks: Publisher: Russel Pergament, Joshua Katzen; Chief editor: Jonathan S. Tobin

Jerusalem News Syndicate (JNS), formerly Jewish News Syndicate, is an American news agency that primarily covers Jewish and Israeli-related topics and news.

Launched in 2011, JNS is considered to be more conservative and hawkish than its competitor, the Jewish Telegraphic Agency. In 2026, JNS changed its name to Jerusalem News Syndicate.

== History ==
The news agency was launched in September 2011 with an exclusive U.S. distribution deal with free Israeli daily Israel Hayom. It is published by Russel Pergament and Joshua Katzen. Its editor-in-chief is American journalist Jonathan S. Tobin. Pergament criticized the Jewish Telegraphic Agency (JTA) for allegedly being insufficiently supportive of Israel in its coverage, particularly on Israel's attack on the MV Mavi Marmara in 2010.

By 2013, JNS was growing faster, with the Jewish newspaper The Forward crediting JNS's pro-Israel perspective and lower price compared to JTA, which is considered "the Associated Press of Jewish media." The wire employed five staff members. Approximately 40 new outlets used JNS, compared to 88 outlets using JTA. Subscribers to JNS paid between $400 to $700 per month, with the first year free, for access to the wire service. In 2015, JNS had between 40 and 55 newspapers, with a third in the free trial period. The editor-in-chief until 2016 was Jacob Kamaras.

JNS won its first two Rockower Awards in 2019. Since then, it has won awards every year, winning a record 11 in 2024. JNS has broken stories later reported by Al Jazeera English, the Jewish Telegraphic Agency and the Jewish Journal. JNS distributed the Dry Bones comic strip previously carried by the Jerusalem Post.

On 21 June, 2026, JNS CEO and Jerusalem Bureau Chief Alex Traiman announced that JNS would change its name from "Jewish News Syndicate" to "Jerusalem News Syndicate". The change was formally announced on 2 July 2026 on an X post, which stated that "For JNS, that city is the Jewish State's eternal capital, Jerusalem."

== Editorial positions ==
In 2015, The Forward described JNS as focusing heavily on Israeli security threats. Frequent columnists Ben Cohen and Stephen M. Flatow wrote often against the Iran Nuclear Deal and the Obama administration more generally, and the JNS board included Middle East Forum president and pro-Israel hawk Daniel Pipes and neoconservative Harvard professor Ruth Wisse.

JNS's publisher Russel Pergament described the wire service as a "nonpartisan, objective, straight down the middle newswire with no axe to grind except one: to see that Israel gets a fair shake in the news." "There are some editors who do not want to upset their readers so they'll publish a JNS news brief about someone in Israel inventing a new flavor of ice cream, but they won't run anything that's kind of scary," he told the Jewish Press.

The Forward, a progressive media outlet, has stated that the JNS was not overtly ideological, but it has been described as conservative, right-leaning, and more hawkish than the JTA. According to Rick Kestenbaum of the American Jewish Press Association, editors of Jewish media outlets are aware of JNS's ideology and difference from the JTA.

In October 2023, Dan Freeman-Maloy, the director of strategic operations at Canadians for Justice and Peace in the Middle East, wrote to chief personnel at the National Post requesting that syndicated content from the JNS be clearly labelled as opinion, stating that the JNS "functions as a pro-Israel think tank that produces hard-line opinions behind a 'National Post Wire Service' disguise" and calling the use of JNS content "a gross betrayal of public trust and a blow to the credibility of journalism nation-wide".

== Financial support ==
The Adelson Foundation was the largest single funder of JNS as of 2015, contributing over $1.2 million between 2013 and 2015. In 2020, JNS's largest single donor was Sheldon Adelson.
