= Gershon Agron =

Israeli politician (1893–1959)

- גרשון אגרון
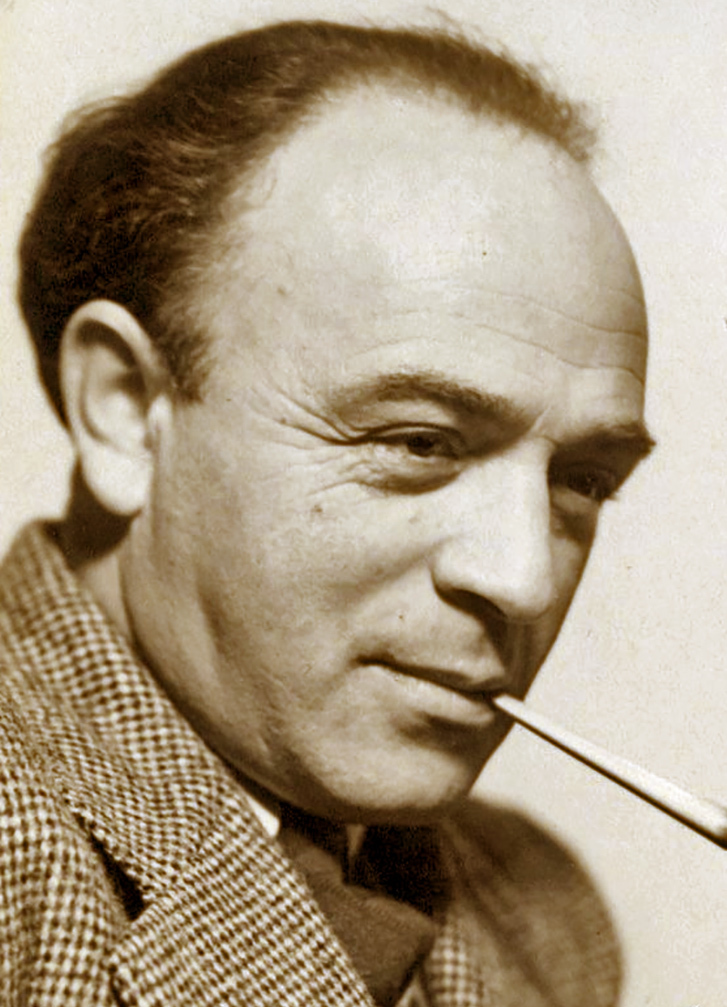
- Agron in the 1930s

Mayor of Jerusalem
- In office 7 September 1955 – 1 November 1959
- Preceded by: Yitzhak Kariv
- Succeeded by: Mordechai Ish-Shalom

Director of the Israeli Government Information Services
- In office June 1949 – 1951

Director of the Zionist Executive Press Office
- In office 1924–1927

Director of the Zionist Commission Press Office
- In office 1921–1921

Personal details
- Born: Gershon Harry Agronsky; 27 December 1893 Mena, Russian Empire
- Died: 1 November 1959 (aged 65) Jerusalem, Israel
- Party: Mapai
- Spouse: Ethel Agronsky (m. 1921–1959)
- Children: 3
- Relatives: See #Family
- Education: Dropsie College; Gratz College; Temple University; University of Pennsylvania
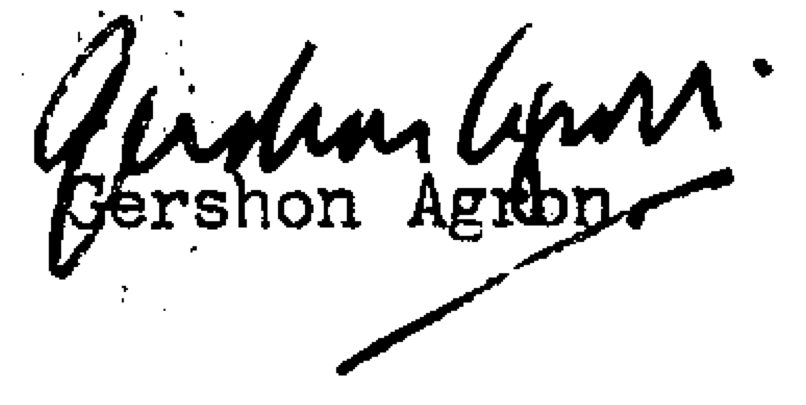
- Signature
- Military career
- Allegiance: United Kingdom
- Branch: British Army
- Service years: 1918–1920
- Unit: Jewish Legion
- Conflicts: World War I; Middle Eastern theatre; Sinai and Palestine campaign
- Awards: British War Medal; Victory Medal

Gershon Harry Agron (Hebrew: גרשון אגרון; (Note: Gershon Agron, Hebrew: גרשון אגרון, romanized: Gershon ʾAgron, IPA: [ɡeʁˈʃon aˈɡʁon]; Russian: Гершон Агрон) né Agronsky; (Note: Gershon Agronsky, Yiddish: גרשון אגראנסקי) 7 January 1894 [O.S. 27 December 1893] – 1 November 1959) was an Israeli (Note: Agron identified himself as Palestinian, referring to the geographic region. See also: Definitions of Palestinian.) newspaper editor, politician, and the mayor of West Jerusalem between 1955 and his death in 1959.

A Zionist from his youth, Agron joined the Jewish Legion and fought in Palestine towards the end of World War I; he had come to the attention of the Zionist Organization of America from the start, and quickly became a spokesperson for American Jewry.

He then joined the Zionist Commission as a press officer and helped expand the Jewish Telegraphic Agency upon his return to the United States, of which he served as editor. He lobbied for the creation of Mandatory Palestine and immigrated there permanently in 1924, heading the Zionist Executive press office. Lacking journalistic agency, and ambitious to create Zionist press, he started his own newspaper, The Palestine Post, which was renamed as The Jerusalem Post after Israel's founding; he changed his own name (from Agronsky to Agron) around the same time.

Agron continued to serve as press officer, promoting Zionism, in the new government, and became mayor of West Jerusalem in 1955, during which he spearheaded the city's development.

He died in office from a lung infection following a cancer operation. He was considered an influential proponent of Zionism.

== Early life and education ==
Gershon Harry Agron was born Gershon Harry Agronsky in Mena, Chernihiv, in the Russian Empire (present-day Ukraine), to Yehuda Agronsky and Sheindl Mirenberg, on 27 December 1893. His maternal grandfather was a rabbi, and his parents had hoped he would be one, too. He received an education as a child based in traditional Eastern European Jewry and Judaism in general, before he immigrated with his family to the United States in 1906. He grew up in Philadelphia, where he attended Mishkan Israel Talmudic School and Brown Preparatory School, and became friends with Israel Goldstein. When they were fourteen, Agron and Goldstein founded Philadelphia's Zionist boys' club. The family later lived in New York, where Agron worked pushing a handcart in the Garment District.

He attended several universities, all in Philadelphia: Temple University, Gratz College, Dropsie College, and the University of Pennsylvania. His university education introduced him to the Western world, but he never became fully Americanized. He was a firm Labor Zionist, which influenced his choice to attend Temple University in 1914; by 1917, he was a strong critic of Labor Zionism and was a General Zionist. Prior to entering Temple University, in 1914, Agron wrote to Arthur Ruppin, at the time the World Zionist Organization (WZO)'s officer in Jaffa, expressing his desire to settle Palestine and requesting advice on whether agriculture or engineering would be a more useful career path for the Zionist enterprise; Ruppin struggled with a response but suggested engineering.

In 1915, Agron began working as a journalist in the United States for Jewish newspapers in English and Yiddish: his first newspaper job was writing obituaries and then editorials for The Jewish World in 1915, for which he gave up his rabbinical training, and he became editor of WZO paper Das Jüdische Volk in 1917, for which he moved to New York. He was also fluent in Hebrew. In March 1918, Agron was a registered annual member of the Jewish Publication Society, and was living at 731 Jackson Street in Philadelphia.

== Career ==
=== 1918–1920: Jewish Legion ===
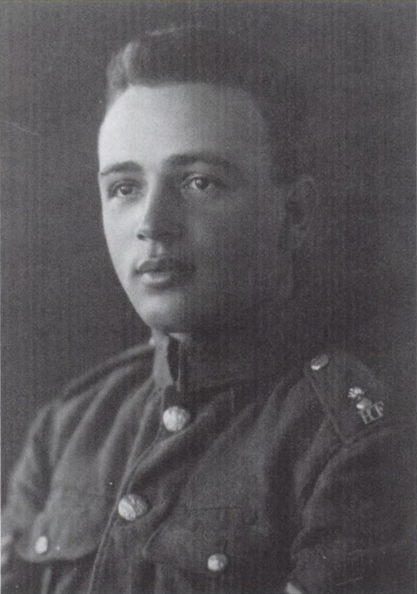
Agron in his Jewish Legionnaire uniform, c.1918

Agron joined the Jewish Legion in April 1918, becoming a corporal and then sergeant during training in Windsor (Canada) and Plymouth (England). Within the Legion, he was part of the 40th Battalion of the Royal Fusiliers. In Canada, Agron – with Dov Yosef, Louis Fischer, and the Brainin brothers – took charge of recruitment for the Legion, enlisting, among others, David Ben-Gurion. Agron was "hand-picked from the beginning" to be the spokesman of the American Jews, and his progress was of import to Zionist Organization of America (ZOA) officials. Jewish writer Moses Z. Frank noted, when meeting recruits in Montreal, "Gershon Agronsky and Louis Fischer stood out among all the other volunteers." Meeting prominent Zionists in London and being surrounded by other young men sharing his Palestine-based cause uplifted Agron and invigorated his belief in Zionism, particularly American Zionism. During his visits to London, he became a public speaker on Zionism; he was demoted twice for going AWOL to make such addresses, being reduced to the rank of private.

Agron fought in Ottoman Palestine in World War I, sending dispatches back from the front for the ZOA. In 1919, Agron wrote a pamphlet, "Survey of the Jewish Battalions", for the Zionist Commission, in which he "lavishly recollected" an enthusiasm among American Jewry for the Legion once war was declared, highlighting the Zionist ideals of recruits. His report was idealised, focusing on success and cultural connections, while avoiding mentions of many interpersonal conflicts and other disappointments among recruits; months after it was published, Agron expressed distaste at his own words, including his kindness to write that the English soldiers' fortune to not be stationed in the Tell El Kebir desert with the Americans was accidental. However, he had written with an "embittered" tone when noting that English recruits to the Legion who did not care for Zionism fought in Palestine, while American Zionist recruits were not afforded the opportunity. The positive impression of the British he gave may have helped the cause with their approval of the Mandate in Palestine. Agron was demobilised locally in 1920; he spent his last months in the military working in the Orderly Room and, upon discovering Legion records would likely be destroyed afterwards, "borrowed these papers for safe keeping". (Note: In this book, Schechtman misquotes Agron when writing that he was in the "49th Battalion"; Agron was, and noted he was, in the 40th Battalion. Their correspondence can be read from the archives of the Jabotinsky Institute.)

In New York in 1922, Agron helped found the American Jewish Legion organisation, serving as its first chairman. The group had the purpose to, among other goals, "colonize Jewish ex-service men in Palestine". He was one of the first Americans to permanently settle in Palestine.

=== 1921–1932: Press Office roles ===
When he was discharged from the Jewish Legion, Agron became a member of the Yishuv, living in Jerusalem. From 1920 to 1921, he worked for the Press Office of the Zionist Commission as a public relations attaché there; in 1921 he was the head of the Zionist Commission Press Office, a position that took him to the United States on the SS Rotterdam in April that year as a member of Chaim Weizmann's WZO delegation with Albert Einstein, Menachem Ussishkin, Shlomo Ginossar, and Ben Zion Mossensohn. This delegation founded Keren Hayesod. Agron then relocated to the United States in 1921 to help set up the new global venture of the Jewish Correspondence Bureau (Jewish Telegraphic Agency; JTA), based in New York, becoming its news editor. In taking over the JTA, Agron officially left Keren Hayesod, both seeing himself first as a journalist and wanting distance from the bureaucracy of the foundation.

His activities in the United States in this period were to promote Zionism to the political institution and to raise funds for Palestine. In June 1921, Agron published some correspondence he had with president Warren G. Harding, vice president Calvin Coolidge, and British Ambassador Geddes, showing to the public that they all gave some form of support to a Jewish state in Palestine. In the fundraising for Keren Hayesod, he said at this time that over $4 million had been pledged by people in the US. In December 1921, Ze'ev Jabotinsky wrote to Agron, asking him to help a Zionist writer to publish in the United States; the two were friends at the time: in 1919, Agron had praised an article written by Jabotinsky and, in 1920, Agron was living in the Jabotinsky house, Ravakia. (Note: In 1920, all male occupants of this house were arrested in two groups for collecting weapons seemingly to fight the British mandatory officials on behalf of Zionism, as part of the aftermath of the 1920 Nebi Musa riots. The first group of arrestees were charged. Agron corresponded from outside with the first group during their detention.)

Until his return to Palestine in 1924, he stayed as the editor of the JTA and was the Yishuv correspondent for international newspapers and press agencies, particularly British and American ones, including The Times; the Manchester Guardian; the Daily Express; and United Press International. He was impatient about immigrating to Palestine, though wrote that he had not wanted to return until he had made significant connections in journalism, choosing to rejoin the yishuv in 1924. At this time, he became the Director of the Zionist Executive's Press Office, and returned to Jerusalem; the role corresponded to and was also known as Commissioner of Press Relations in the Political Department of the Jewish Agency and head of the Government Press Office (GPO). (Note: The Zionist Organization became the Zionist Commission in 1908, which became the Zionist Executive in 1921, which became the Jewish Agency in 1929, which ultimately became the government of Israel. Agron served as the head of department for dissemination of information in these bodies for periods between 1921 and 1951.)

In 1924, Agron outlined his objectives to Weizmann:

Of course, the sledge-hammer does not do here. It's got to be insidious. Any attempt to jam propaganda down the news agencies or papers' throats would only bring rejection slips. As it is, two or three non-Zionist items make even a downright Zionist item acceptable [...] My stuff, though it may not deal with Zionism or even anything Jewish breathes a spirit of constructive optimism, predisposing the reader to see that in Palestine there is a state of 'normalcy,' where Zionist reconstruction can be taken for granted.

— Gershon Agron, 18 August 1924 letter to Chaim Weizmann

As the director of the press for Zionism and Jewish Palestine, his main duties were to advocate on behalf of the Yishuv to the world, encouraging tourism and immigration through relationships with the global media. The GPO also published its own news media, a weekly bulletin called "News from the Land of Israel", available in multiple languages. Despite his international media connections, Agron's attempts at having the Associated Press carry his pro-Zionism articles regularly failed throughout the 1920s; the United States, where he was initially based and later sent copy from Jerusalem, had a media landscape at this time based on isolationism, and was loath to publish the affairs of the Yishuv.

Though journalism was a prominent career among Zionists, Agron was still the only established English-language newsman in Palestine, and was sought after when local events caught international attention: when the 1927 Jericho earthquake occurred, Agron wrote for multiple wire services and filed copy with his wife's name after making an exclusivity deal with Hearst's Universal Service. At this time he also wrote for The Christian Science Monitor, as Jerusalem correspondent, and The New Palestine. He continued in his public service roles, being the ZOA representative in Jerusalem by September 1929.

=== 1932–1948: The Palestine Post ===
Gershon Agronsky ... launched the paper with the idea that it would present the case of yishuv, or Jewish establishment in Palestine, to the representatives of the British Mandatory regime in a language and style that they could understand.

— Stephen Klaidman, Present Tense, 1979.

Shortly after his Hearst deal, Agron began writing the Palestine Bulletin for the JTA, which was circulated around the Arab world. He had been told he could have editorial control over the Bulletin but was not given such freedom; he started considering founding his own newspaper. Agron's want for a newspaper with political purpose further developed following the 1929 Palestine riots. In 1932, he proposed an English-language Palestinian newspaper to Ted Lurie, another young American Yishuv settler. Lurie was immediately invested and borrowed money from his father to take Agron to London so that they could raise funds to start The Palestine Post; succeeding, they ran the first copy on 1 December 1932. Initially, it had a circulation of 1,200, was distributed around Palestine, and was predominantly read by the British soldiers and German immigrants; Agron tailored the content to the readers, for example, including cricket results and cartoons. The Post was heavily aligned with the Israeli Labor Party (at the outset, Mapai) from the beginning, and Agron as well as successive editors made no secret that the newspaper was more interested in advocating for the state than freedom of the press. It was later supported by the Jewish Agency.

Agron admitted many of his Zionist biases, saying that under his editorship, The Post deliberately minimised the oppositions of Arabs to Israel and belittled Palestinian Arab views. (Note: Under Lurie, who followed Agron as editor, an appointment which coincided with the creation of the State of Israel, the newspaper attempted more balance in its Arab affairs coverage.) Louis Fischer, a fellow Jewish Legion soldier and friend but also antagonist of Agron, was more interested in Russian and Communist ideology; he described Agron's journalism work as pure Zionist propaganda and "regarded [it] as a poor career choice". Scholar Matthew Silver said that Fischer was "uncharitable" in this characterisation, instead saying Agron's "indirect propaganda", borne from his start in publicity, was useful outreach; Silver reflected that, in the cultural context of the time, Agron dispelled antisemitism and the poor image other Jewish groups were giving of the Yishuv to people around the world. Kinneret College historian Giora Goodman wrote that, in terms of Jewish Agency media propaganda, the Palestine Post was "of greatest value", saying that, while nominally independent, the Post was recognised as "its semi-official mouthpiece"; Goodman noted that Agron was held in high regard, advising the Jewish Agency press bureau and espousing that "the best propaganda is produced by non-official means". Despite this, and the fact the newspaper had broken with the British after seven years, the British High Commissioner, Harold MacMichael, praised the paper on its tenth anniversary for "stating facts fairly, respecting confidences and avoiding equally sensationalism, snobbery and cheap insinuation".

Staff of the newspaper knew Agron as "GA", and he treated them all like close family, though he ran the newspaper "as his kingdom". Among the paper's earliest reporters was Agron's nephew, Martin Agronsky, later a famous American television journalist. Agronsky left the paper to work for himself after a year, but continued to contribute to it for many years.

When the 1936–1939 Arab revolt in Palestine broke out, more British troops arrived, and circulation went up to around 20,000; it became more widespread and successful during World War II, when Allied soldiers spent much time in the Middle East. Agron became a war correspondent, covering the North African campaign from 1941 to 1943; he also visited Turkey in 1942 and was there when the MV Struma, carrying Jewish refugees from Europe, sank, which he blamed on the Allies. The Post, in part because of British mandatory policy in Palestine, made efforts to serve as an anti-Nazi "fighting paper", but the sides did not always agree: continuing to report on Arab terrorism saw an issue censored in 1936, and writing scathing articles against the White Paper of 1939 (the British imposing more restrictions on Jews living in Palestine) and deportations to Mauritius left the published newspaper full of white blank spaces. It was these efforts that saw the Post "practically replace the Mandatory Government's information office as the most dependable source of information for the foreign press", though employees of the newspaper found getting to work increasingly difficult due to frequent curfews and encounters with Army and police patrols.

In June 1945, following World War II, Hans Morgenthau requested Agron write to US president Harry S. Truman to update him on the mood of the Jews in Palestine, particularly in response to the White Paper of 1939. Agron affirmed to Morgenthau that should the Allies show support for Zionist resolution in Palestine there would be "no trouble" with the Arabs.

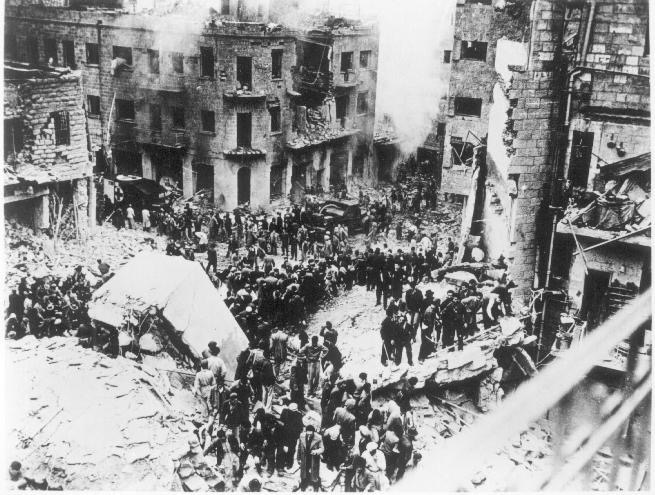
Aftermath of the Palestine Post bombing

During the 1947–1949 Palestine war, the newspaper published editions daily (except the Sabbath) and was said to be vital for morale. The offices were frequently targets of attacks by the Arab Legion because of its influence. With few exceptions, Agron went in to the offices every day, which he called "the daily gamble". On 1 February 1948, the office building was the target of a truck bombing, which killed three people; Agron had not been in his office. Though not as severely, it was hit many times and became "one of the Arabs' favorite targets". The next day's edition was still printed, though short; the bombing, and the rumour that British officers may have helped the Arabs execute it, saw the Yishuv turn Jerusalem into a front line, closing the streets and manning them. Agron refused to leave Jerusalem, and work continued in the destroyed offices with a new printing press located elsewhere and underground – sometimes it was printed in Tel Aviv.

The newspaper was renamed The Jerusalem Post on 13 May 1950, celebrating Israel Independence Day shortly after the creation of the state of Israel. No longer needing to remain pro-British, the purpose of the newspaper also changed, and the board took advantage of the fact that it would be the only local Palestinian news that most foreign diplomats could read, turning it into a "key vehicle" defending Israel.

On various occasions, Agron served as envoy of the WZO, and he was a delegate at International Zionist Congresses. In 1927, he represented the WZO at the International Reclamation Conference in Honolulu, and he was a member of the 1945 Jewish Agency delegation to the United Nations Conference on International Organization in San Francisco that saw the United Nations founded. He held special commissions for investigating conditions of Jews in Palestine, Thessaloniki, Aden, India, Iraq, and Romania. During his mission to India, he encouraged the small local Jewish community to build on their own importance and to help communicate Zionism to people of the East, which may have encouraged Joseph Sargon to start an Indian Zionist newsletter, Jewish Bulletin, in 1930. By 1945, Agron was writing as Jerusalem correspondent for The Daily Telegraph and Exchange Telegraph. He would also visit San Francisco on many occasions, becoming well known in the city and speaking at local organisations.

=== 1949–1959: Information Office and mayoralty ===
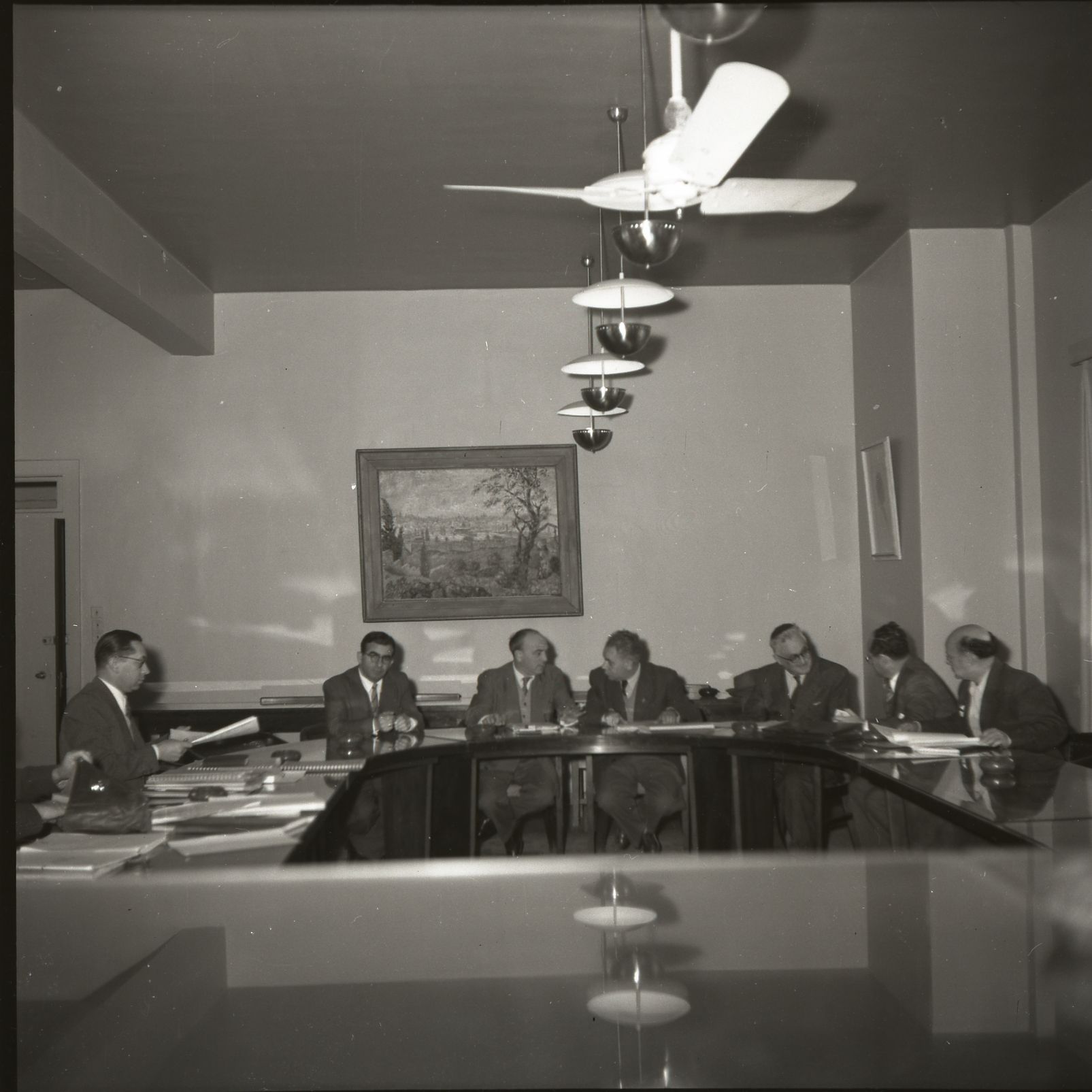
Agron (third from left) in a meeting in 1953

Following the 1947–1949 Palestine war, the Israeli Information Services were created, something (as "a re-organized and enlarged Public Relations Department") which Agron had proposed in January 1947, headed by Agron; when he took the role as Information Chief in June 1949, he dropped the "-sky" suffix from his name as a form of Hebraisation, and took a leave of absence from being editor of The Post. He had been asked to take the position during the war, in a telegram from Moshe Sharett; though Agron took it out of duty, he had been hoping to be named Israel's ambassador to Britain. He left the Information Chief role in 1951, after asking to be relieved of it towards the end of 1950, citing its lack of independence – his role spanned the scopes of the Prime Minister's Office, the Foreign Office, and the Interior Office, each of which had its own interests – and lack of budget.

He began working at the Post full-time again on 15 February 1951, allowing Lurie to continue as interim editor while he instead travelled to the UK and US for United Jewish Appeal fundraiding opportunities; though he was successful, he found the travel exhausting, and stopped.

In September 1955, he was elected mayor of West Jerusalem for a four-year term, officially resigning his editorship. The position had been "an honor and task that he dreamed of". He took the role after a period of government intervention because of chaotic infighting preventing proper city administration. As mayor, he inherited many problems, particularly facing financial challenges after years of great spending trying to recover from the Battle for Jerusalem during the Palestine War. Under Agron, there were many fewer fights in the city council, and those which did happen he could reportedly end quickly by reminding the chamber that time also cost money.

During his term, he played a key role in the development of the western sectors of the city, bringing infrastructure and utilities to neighbourhoods and improving employment through tax breaks for companies moving to Jerusalem and hiring, while raising money through taxes "collected more efficiently". Despite his many introductions, he is said to have preserved the city's character, a specific goal of his. Historian Howard Morley Sachar lauded the achievements of cultural and construction projects planned and approved by Agron, but he also had detractors due to his modernisation of the city, with protesters creating caricatures of him in the uniform of a Nazi officer. There was specific Orthodox opposition to his opening of multiple public swimming pools. He remained in office until his death in 1959.

== Views on Zionism and Jewry ==
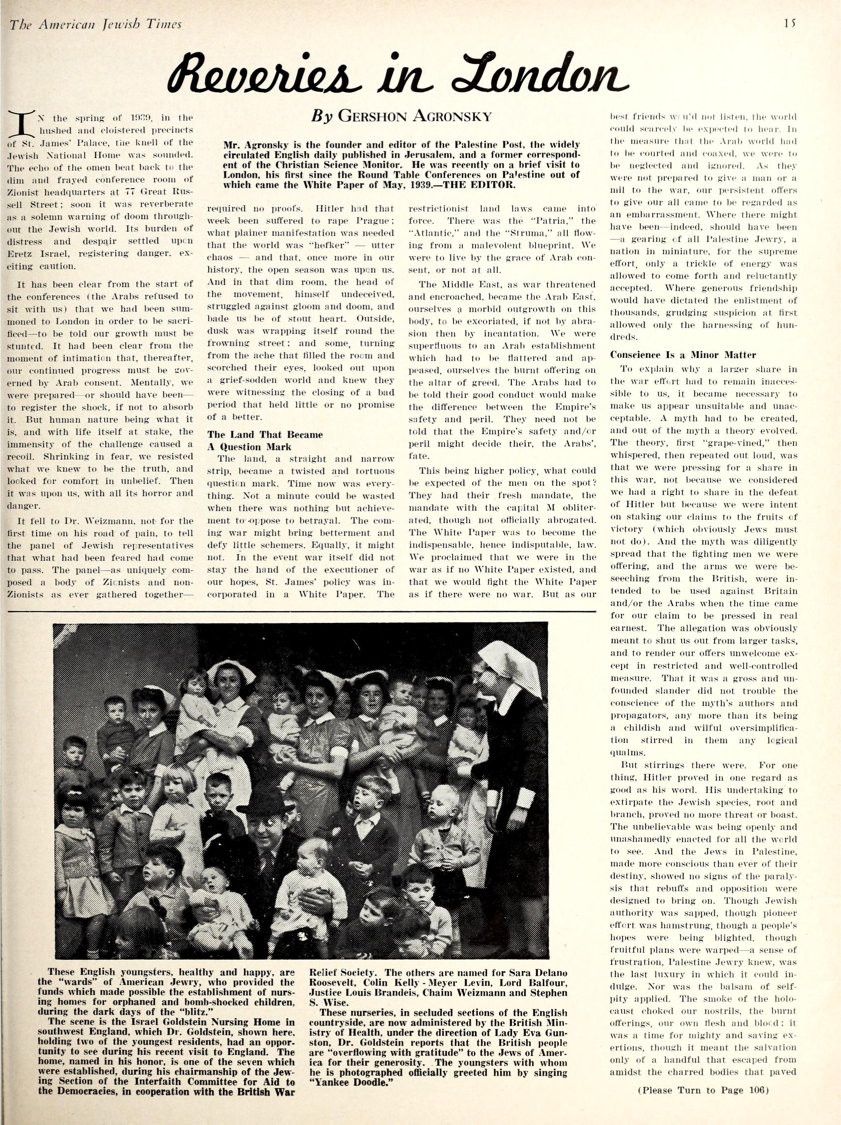
Part of an editorial written by Agron for The American Jewish Times-Outlook in September 1944, discussing the White Paper of 1939 and the Holocaust

A preeminent and influential Zionist, Agron had been both a Labor Zionist and General Zionist, dying a Mapainik, but also had individual views on the ideology. As a young man in Philadelphia, Agron had been heavily influenced by the work of Shmaryahu Levin. He became a hasbara pioneer after becoming disillusioned with the British control over Palestine.

Silver opined that what made Agron more successful than other young Zionist journalists in the 1920s was his professional rejection of the Zionist principle of negation of the Diaspora. Though he personally wanted to be part of a Yishuv "that utterly rejected the diaspora", he believed the only way to create and safeguard this community was to engage with the diaspora as well as gentiles abroad, using public relations and propaganda. In 1926, he defended the large sum paid to Hayim Nahman Bialik to undertake a tour of the United States so that his poetry could elevate Zionist propaganda there.

On his deathbed, in 1959, Agron assented to an international edition of the Jerusalem Post being created, which the newspaper said was an acknowledgment of "the growing importance of the Diaspora". In a fortieth-anniversary publication, The Jerusalem Post noted that Agron's initial policy directive for the newspaper was written as a business mission statement but "was, in fact, the climactic expression of years of thought on the Zionist question". However, on a 1952 visit to the United States, Agron is reported to have said: "We [people of Israel] are no longer concerned with the attitude of others… Once, Jewish public relations were a delicate matter… Now, only our actions are significant."

Agron wrote in 1925 that, to build a successful society in Palestine, the Yishuv required many American Jews, though he was careful to warn that these potential immigrants must understand what migration would mean. In his pamphlet on the Jewish Legion he had suggested that Palestinian Jews (those who had settled before World War I) should form the basis of Jewish settlement in Palestine.

When Agron referred to Jews and Palestinian Jews, he meant only Ashkenazi Jews; he thought that Sephardim were "thoroughly Egyptianized, Arab-ized".

With his experience of politics, Agron, who was not much of a political party person, espoused that Israel needed to become a one-party state, finding there were too many parties to work together effectively. His views on making Israel fruitful were that it needed "Zionism, a strong army, good management and well organized labor". Silver wrote that Agron initially took a more assistant role in Palestinian Zionism, conflicted that he had been an advocate for Zionism outside of Palestine for longer than he had lived there; Silver described the 1920s as Agron's "period of existential groping".

== Family ==
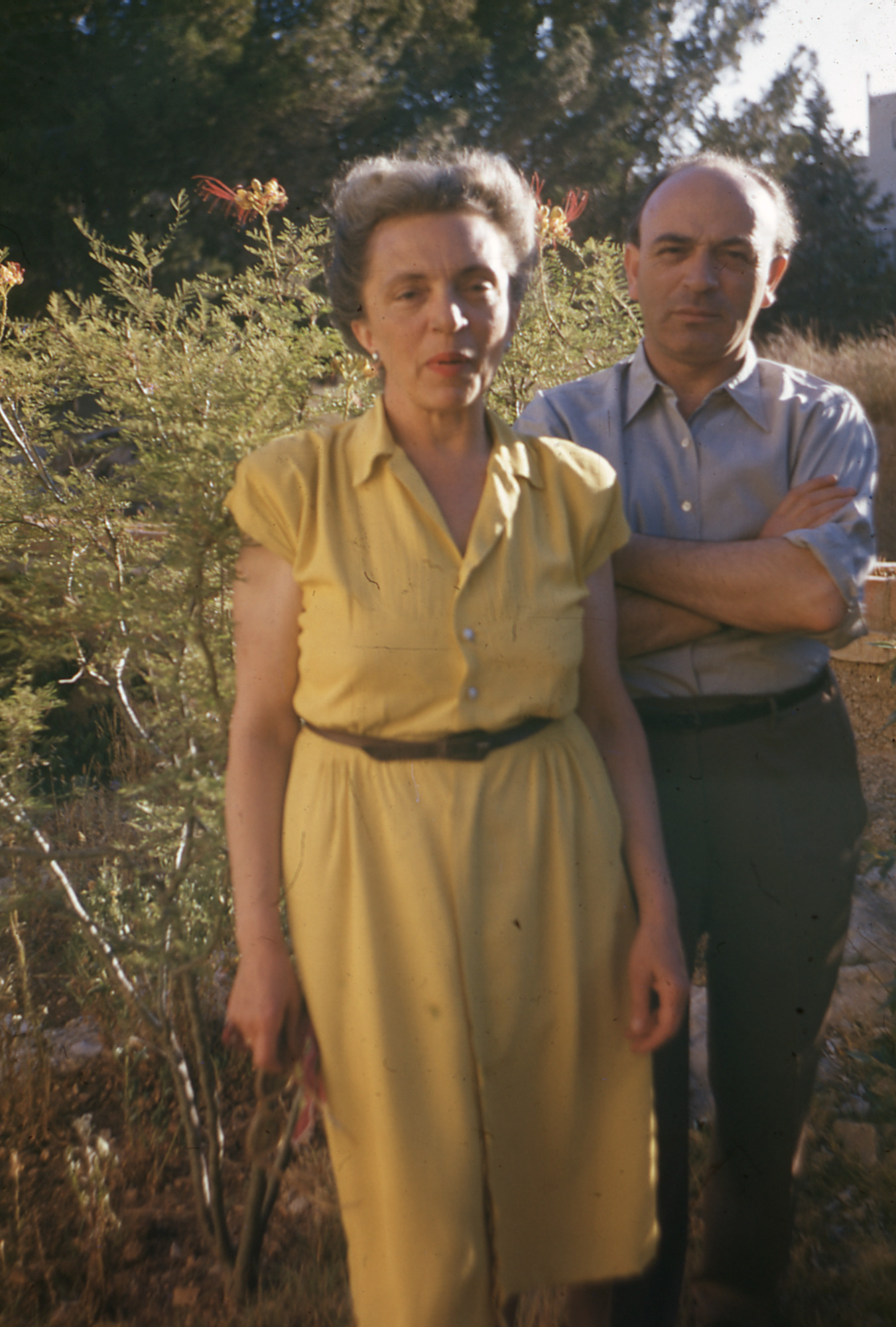
Ethel and Gershon Agronsky in 1948 during the Battle for Jerusalem

Until his death, Agron was married to Ethel (née Lipshutz), the daughter of his half-sister Anna Agronsky; they had married in April 1921 in the United States. Agron only told his wife after they married that he expected her to emigrate to Palestine with him, which she did reluctantly. When they moved to Jerusalem, the couple first lived on Queen Melisande's Way, later moving to a spacious villa in Rehavia at 4 Rashba Street. They had three children: son Dani Agron (1922–1992), who married Hassia Levy-Agron; daughter Varda Tamir (1926–2008), who married Avraham Tamir; and daughter (Yehudit) Judith Mendelsohn (1924–2006), who married Harvey J. Mendelsohn and lived in Cleveland.

When Agron's children were young, they attended Debora Kallen's Parents Educational Association School in Jerusalem. An advanced but strict school also attended by the children of Agron's contemporaries, it was housed in a residence of Haile Selassie, near to the Agrons. They did not stay there long, though, as World War II broke out. Agron and other key figures worried that, should the Nazis invade Palestine, prominent figures would be the first targets; he sent his children to kibbutzim, where they lived for the duration of the war. In 1993, Varda reflected that this attempt at protection was naive, but awareness of the Holocaust did not reach her until post-war immigration. She noted that she struggled to empathise with Holocaust survivors who arrived, saying this was due to an "unjustified arrogance" stemming from Zionist education which saw non-Palestinian Jews as other.

The Agronsky children attended Beit Hakerem High School, where Varda was a classmate of Avshalom Haviv and Shmuel Kaufman, son of Judah Even Shemuel. She felt that in school and in society, her generation was subject to Zionist "brainwashing". Varda was the only of the siblings to graduate high school; Dani was repeatedly expelled for bad behaviour and was sent to Haifa as a teenager, where he attended vocational school and lived with the parents of Ezer Weizman, while Judith was (according to her sister) more of a housewife.

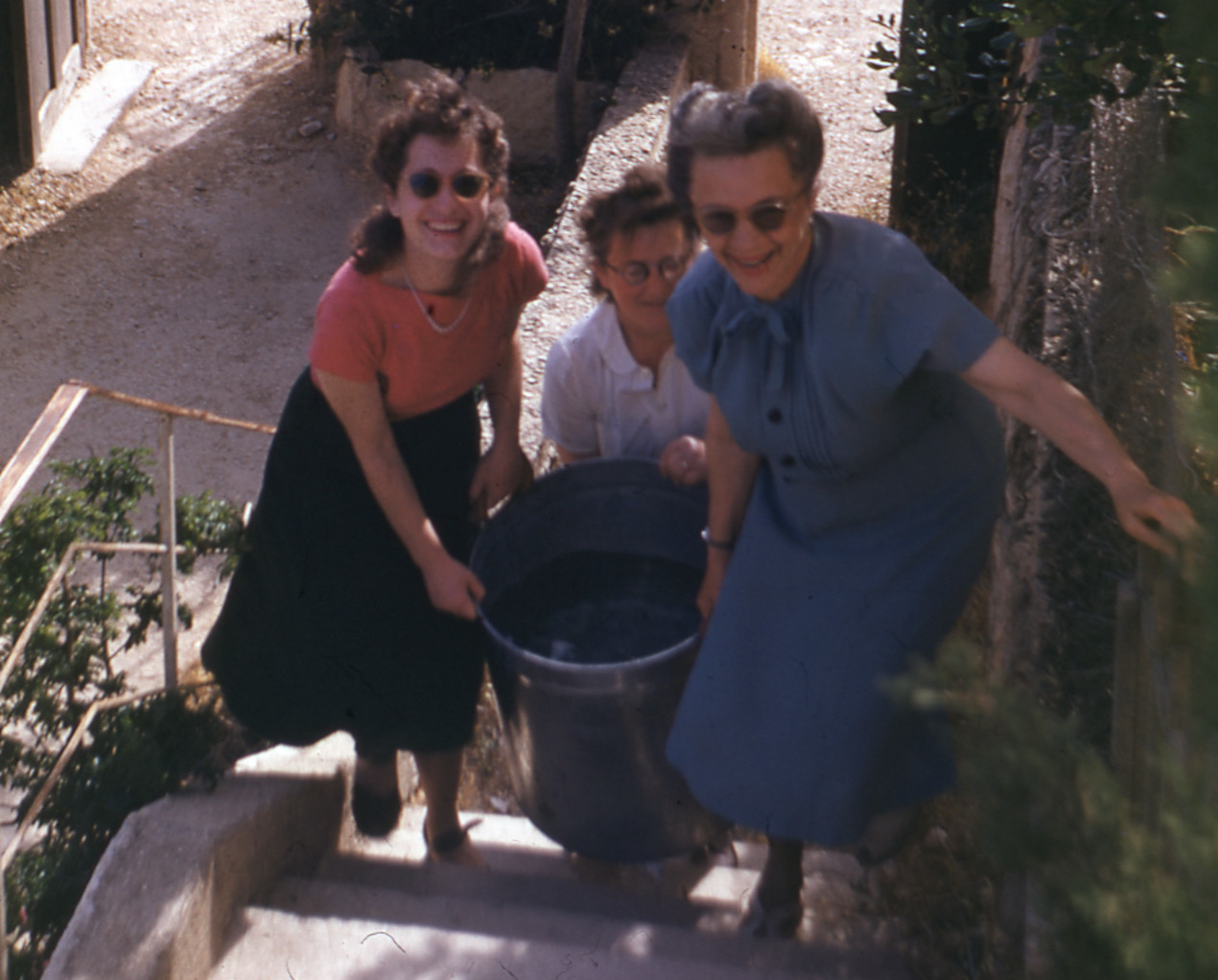
During the Palestine war, water was strictly rationed. Ethel (right) is carrying a daily ration of water with Betty Levin (left) and the Agrons' housekeeper; Moshe Marlin Levin wrote for the Post and he and his wife lived with the Agrons for a period.

Ethel was born Ethel Lipschutz. She attended William Penn High School and Goucher College, where she was elected as a member of the Phi Beta Kappa honor society in 1917. In Palestine, she served in public life; she worked with the Hadassah Women's Zionist Organization of America and was on the Hadassah Council in Palestine and Israel. In particular, she was the head of the Hadassah Youth Services Committee and, in 1948, the head of the Hadassah Council in Palestine. This council typically saw socialite wives on its board, including Ethel Agronsky; she took her role seriously, campaigning for children and writing for Hadassah Magazine. Through her advocacy work, she was put on the Israeli government's Social Service Advisory Committee. During the Israel-Palestine war, Ethel helped to run the emergency Hadassah medical centres, in secret locations and often without water, power, or supplies, to treat the casualties.

Daniel "Dani" (also Danny), was born in New York but raised in Palestine; he was part of the Jewish Brigade and Haganah, a weapons smuggler for the Israel Defense Forces during the Israel-Palestine war, and co-founded Israel Aerospace Industries with Shimon Peres. As a leading figure in the Haganah, Dani Agron controlled the secret flying school and its pilots, as well as other aerospace concerns, including around Rome as it served as a transition ground for volunteers to fight for Israel against Palestine. In charge of Machal volunteer pilots, he sent them around Europe and the world to learn to fly whatever planes the group could acquire, ironically including former German World War II planes. He lived in various hotels, finally settling on the Excelsior Hotel in Rome at the same time as figures like Orson Welles spent time there, as it would allow him to keep a dog; he turned his room into a communications headquarters.

Later in the war, Dani Agron recruited American pilots Jack Weinronk (to lead the pilot school) and Danny Rosin (to be an instructor). Though he loved planes, Dani could never pilot himself. He had always had poor eyesight and, in 1956, he drove over a landmine from the Suez Crisis and lost a leg. In the 1960s, he started and managed Merom Aviation Services, a cropdusting company. In the 1970s, Dani Agron worked as the business manager of The Jerusalem Post. He was also a noted woodcarver. In later life, he struggled with mental illness.

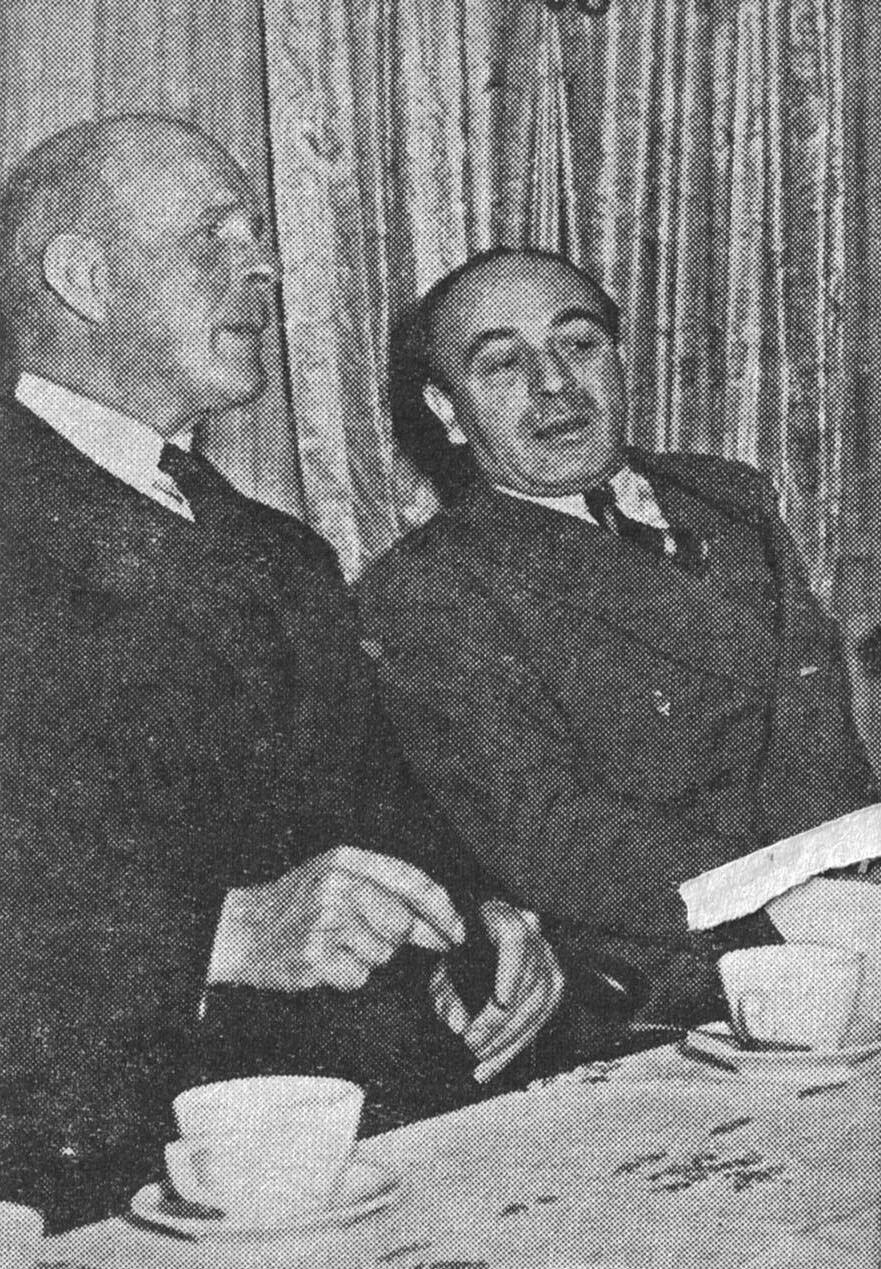
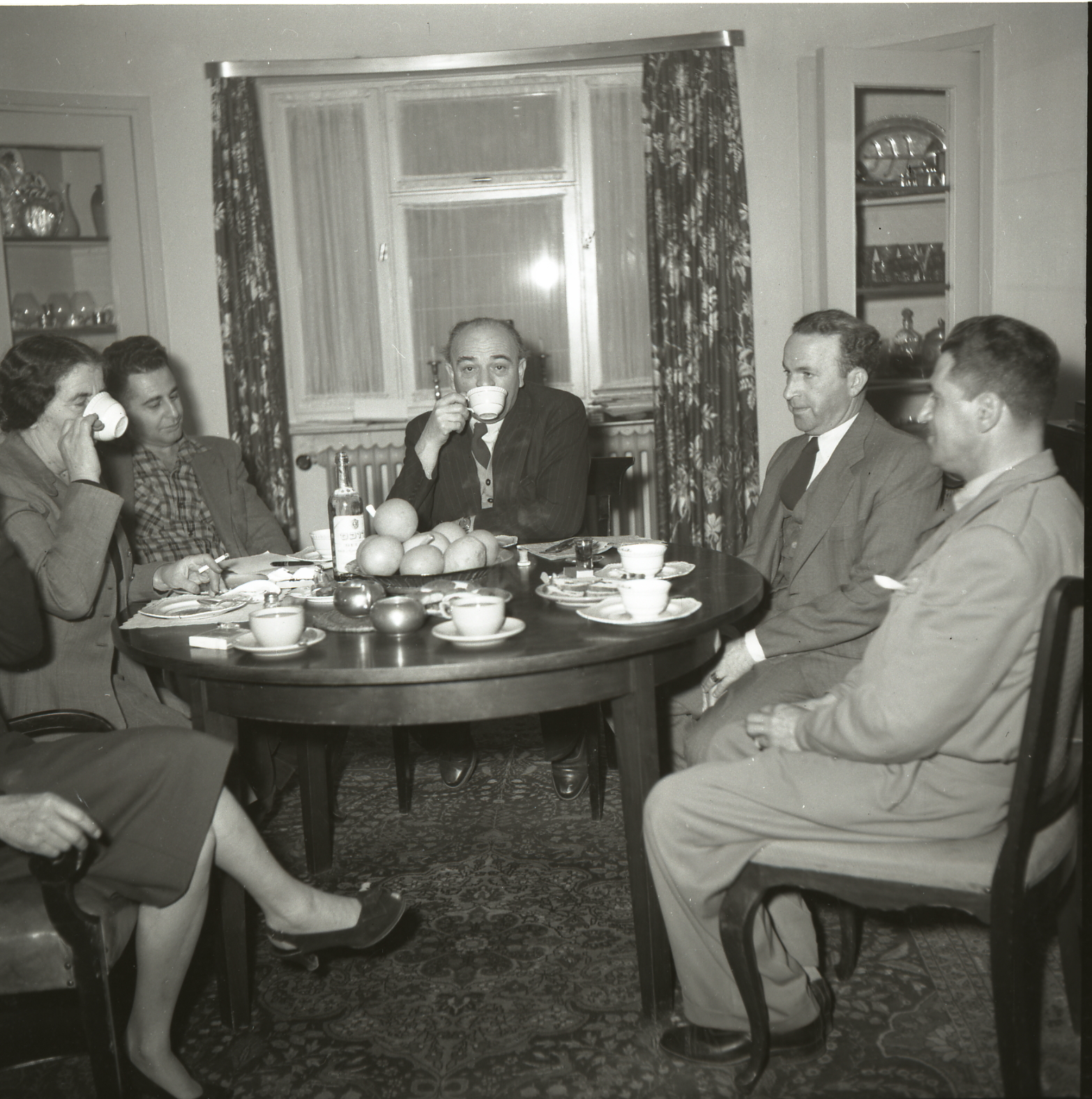
Agron taking tea at home with (left image) Lord Gort (left) in 1945 and (right image) Golda Meir (left, drinking) and others (Agron is at centre, drinking) in 1953

The family was one of the wealthiest in Jerusalem even when they first settled there, only becoming more comfortable as Agron became more prominent. However, he crafted "a bourgeois brand of idealism" to fit in with the ideals of Zionism and the society of the Yishuv, pretending that he owned and lived off little; Silver also suggested that Agron was very self-conscious and anxious about gaining success, and would want to hide this. In addition, he took in many immigrants to Israel before they settled, and gave many aspiring journalists from around the world jobs at the Post. On a 1952 visit to the United States, Agron "gazed languidly" over the luxurious lobby of the Saxony Hotel then criticised the conspicuous consumption.

Though the family were somewhat outsiders in the Israeli institution, being seen as American, they entertained friendships with prominent figures and were popular in Jerusalem social life: "Foreign and Israeli journalists, Arabs, Englishmen and Jews all met at the Agrons to talk politics and drink tea." They were at the centre of social life from their arrival.

Family tree (Note: Including notable relatives three generations each way. Italics denotes non-blood relations. Sources:)

Shmuel Labe Agronsky	Fruma Chana
Agronsky son (1826–?)	Yuda Agronsky (1835–1915)
Yehuda Agronsky (1858–?)	Sheindl née Mirenberg	Hillel Agronsky (1867–?)
Anna née Agronsky
Ethel née Lipshutz (1900–?)	Gershon Agron (1894–1959)	Isador Agrons (c.1880–?)	Jack Agron (1903–1969)
Harvey J. Mendelsohn (1911–1992)	Judith Mendelsohn (1924–2006)	Varda Tamir (1926–2008)	Avraham Tamir (1924–2010) (Note: Tamir and Varda separated before 1987.)	Dani Agron (1922–1992)	Hassia Levy-Agron (1923–2001)	Martin Agronsky (1915–1999) (Note: American journalist Martin Agronsky was Gershon Agron's nephew.)	Howard Agron
Ruth E. Mendelsohn	Michael A. Mendelsohn (1950–1998)	Dan Mendelsohn	Michal Shany (b. 1950)	Gideon Tamir	Daphna Efrat (b. 1955)	Ovad Efrat (b. 1956)	Amos Agron (b. 1957)	Jonathan Agronsky (b. c.1946)	Ronald Agron
Daniel Efrat (b. 1982) (Note: Israeli actor Daniel Efrat is Gershon Agron's great-grandson.)	Dianna Agron (b. 1986) (Note: American actress Dianna Agron is Gershon Agron's second cousin, three times removed.)

== Death ==
Agron was admitted to the Hadassah Medical Center in early September 1959, for routine liver surgery to treat cancer. Following the surgery, he contracted pneumonia and subsequently died of this infection on 1 November 1959 at the age of 65. A year earlier, he had approved the opening of a public swimming pool which would be integrated for men and women to swim together; ultra-Orthodox rabbis of the Edah HaChareidis court put the Pulsa diNura curse on him for this, and his premature death has been credited to the curse. The Canadian Jewish Review said he "died after a long illness." At the time of his death, Agron was running for re-election as mayor of Jerusalem, with the vote set to happen on 3 November 1959.

He received a state funeral, attended by over 40,000 people, with a eulogy from Sharett calling him "one of the greatest personalities of the Zionist movement". He was buried at Har HaMenuchot, near the gravesites of Peretz Smolenskin and Joseph Klausner.

== Legacy and impact ==
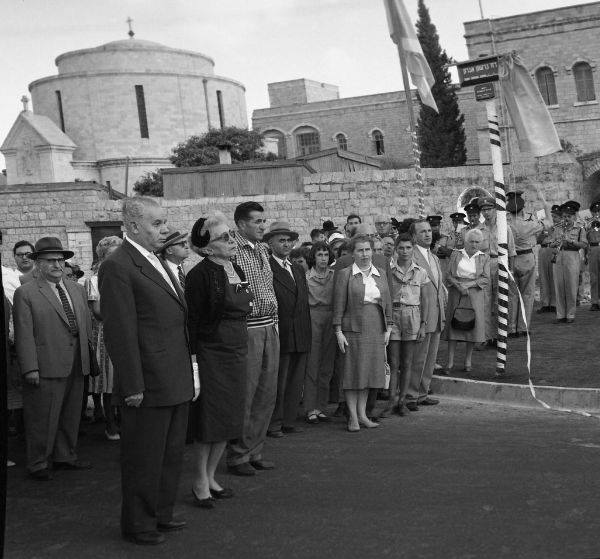
The opening of Gershon Agron Street took place in October 1960; Agron's mayoral successor Mordechai Ish-Shalom is standing in the foreground.

Agron Street in downtown Jerusalem and Agron House, the former headquarters of the Israeli Press Association, are named after him. The cornerstone of Agron House was laid on 10 October 1961 by Sharett; in a tribute at the cornerstone ceremony, Goldstein said Agron was "the journalist par excellence", also praising his services as an ambassador for Israel and Zionism:

Wherever he came, he not only reflected the light of Zion but radiated it to Jews and non-Jews. His warm, sparkling personality captured many hearts and his brilliant, untrammeled approach captured many minds. Gershon disarmed antagonists, converted neutrals into partisans, and partisans into enthusiasts.

In 1950, he was said to be "one of Yishuv's most influential and courageous spokesmen". In 2012, Ulf Hannerz said Agron was "a culture hero of Israeli journalism".

The personal papers of Gershon Agron are kept at the Central Zionist Archives in Jerusalem. His diaries were posthumously published in 1964.

== Bibliography ==
- Agronsky, Gershon (1927). Jewish Reclamation of Palestine. OCLC 56843116.
- Agronsky, Gershon (1928). The View of a Palestinian: A Letter from one American in Palestine to another. OCLC 22032319.
- Agronsky, Gershon (1928). Ten Years of Zionist Activity in Palestine. OCLC 173026923.
- Agronsky, Gershon (1948). Palestine After the Mandate. OCLC 1117113179.
- Agron, Gershon (1956). Portrait of Jerusalem: Contemporary Views of the Holy City. OCLC 19295487.
