= Le Grand Akshan =

- Directed by: Ron Goldman
- Produced by: Limor Kalo
- Release date: 2003
- Running time: 58 minutes
- Country: Israel
- Language: English

Le Grand Akshan is a 2003 documentary film by Ron Goldman about a doomed ship's failed voyage to Mandatory Palestine that happens to uncover shocking family secrets.

== Plot ==
Reading a newspaper article about the search for the wreck of the Struma, a small ship that was torpedoed and sunk carrying Jewish refugees from Axis-allied Romania to Palestine, Goldman is shocked when his grandmother reveals that his great-great-grandfather Luzer was one of the nearly 800 passengers who died that day in the waters of the Black Sea. This once-unspoken family history leads Goldman to dig deeper and further, until he has revealed a narrative that is deeply complex, and says more about his legacy than his ancestors ever hoped to share.

At the center of this narrative is Goldman's great-grandfather, Luger's son Grisha, a man whose tenacity earned him the professional nickname, Le Grand Akshan, or “the truly stubborn one.” Goldman once considered his great-grandfather a source of embarrassment because of the corny middle name he inherited from the mysterious “man with the sharp, piercing look” whose picture hung in his grandmother's study. He is shocked to learn the central role that Grisha played in helping his family escape the Holocaust. His heroics involved a harrowing series of moves that took him to Romania, Iraq, India and, eventually, the young state of Israel, where Grisha entered the nascent cinema industry. Goldman became fascinated with his great-grandfather, and the drive to learn more about him fuels Goldman to complete the film.

== See also ==
- SS Exodus
- MV Mefküre — a similar sinking on 5 August 1944
- Patria disaster
- Struma disaster
- MS St. Louis (Voyage of the Damned)
