= West Jerusalem =

Section of Jerusalem controlled by Israel

Coordinates: 31°46′55″N 35°13′10″E

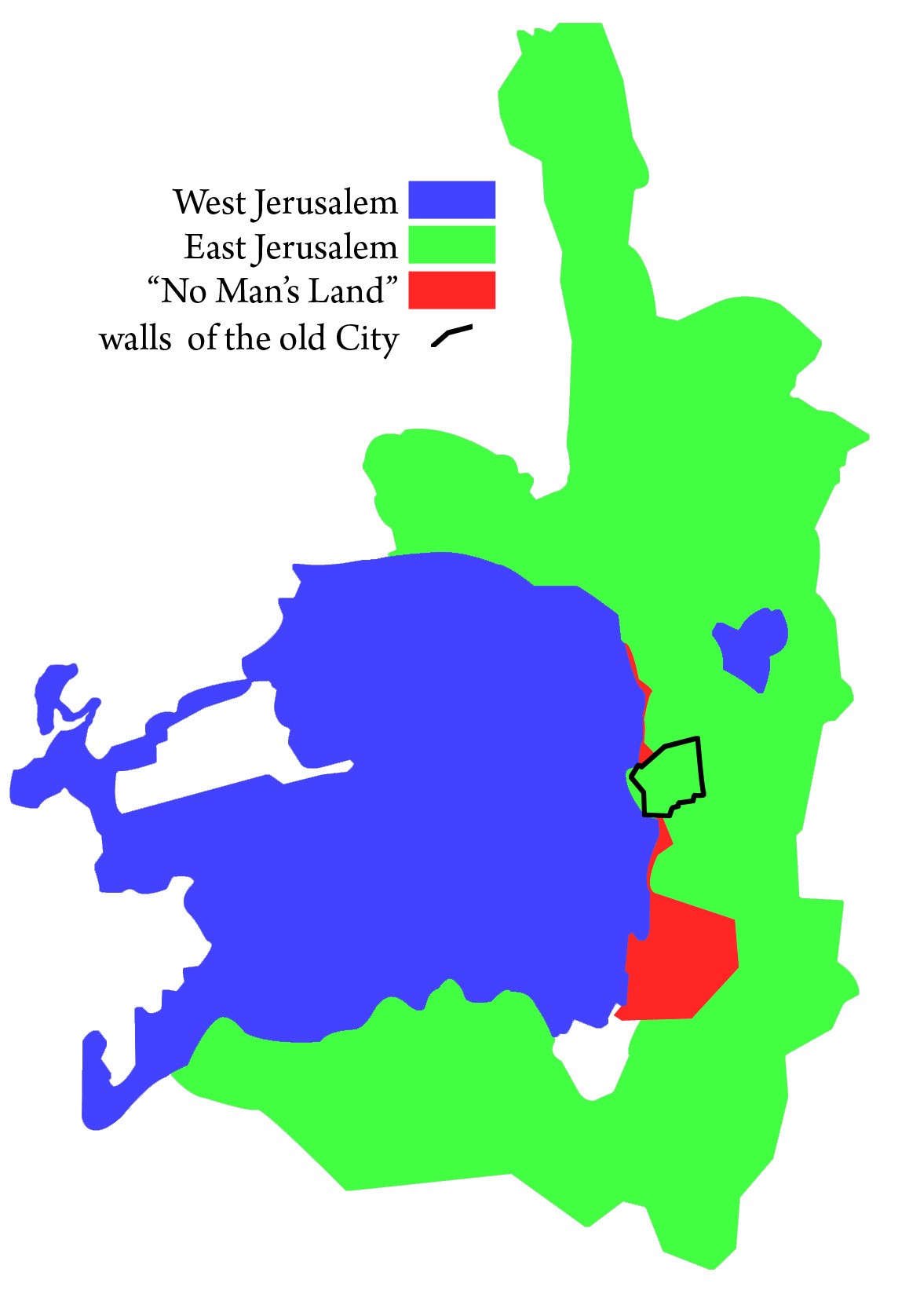
Zones of control in Jerusalem between 1948 and 1967

West Jerusalem or Western Jerusalem (Hebrew: מַעֲרַב יְרוּשָׁלַיִם, Ma'aráv Yerushaláyim; Arabic: القدس الغربية, al-Quds al-Ġarbiyyah) is the section of Jerusalem that was controlled by Israel at the end of the 1948 Arab–Israeli War. As the city was divided by the Green Line (Israel's erstwhile de facto border, established by the 1949 Armistice Agreements), West Jerusalem was formally delineated as the counterpart to East Jerusalem, which was controlled by Jordan. Though Israel has controlled the entirety of Jerusalem since the 1967 Arab–Israeli War, the boundaries of West Jerusalem and East Jerusalem remain internationally recognized as de jure due to their significance to the process of determining the status of Jerusalem, which has been among the primary points of contention in the Arab–Israeli conflict and the Israeli–Palestinian conflict. With certain exceptions, undivided Jerusalem is not internationally recognized as the sovereign territory of either Israel or the State of Palestine. However, recognition of Israeli sovereignty over only West Jerusalem is more widely accepted as a plausible diplomatic position, as the United Nations regards East Jerusalem as part of the Israeli-occupied West Bank.

== History ==
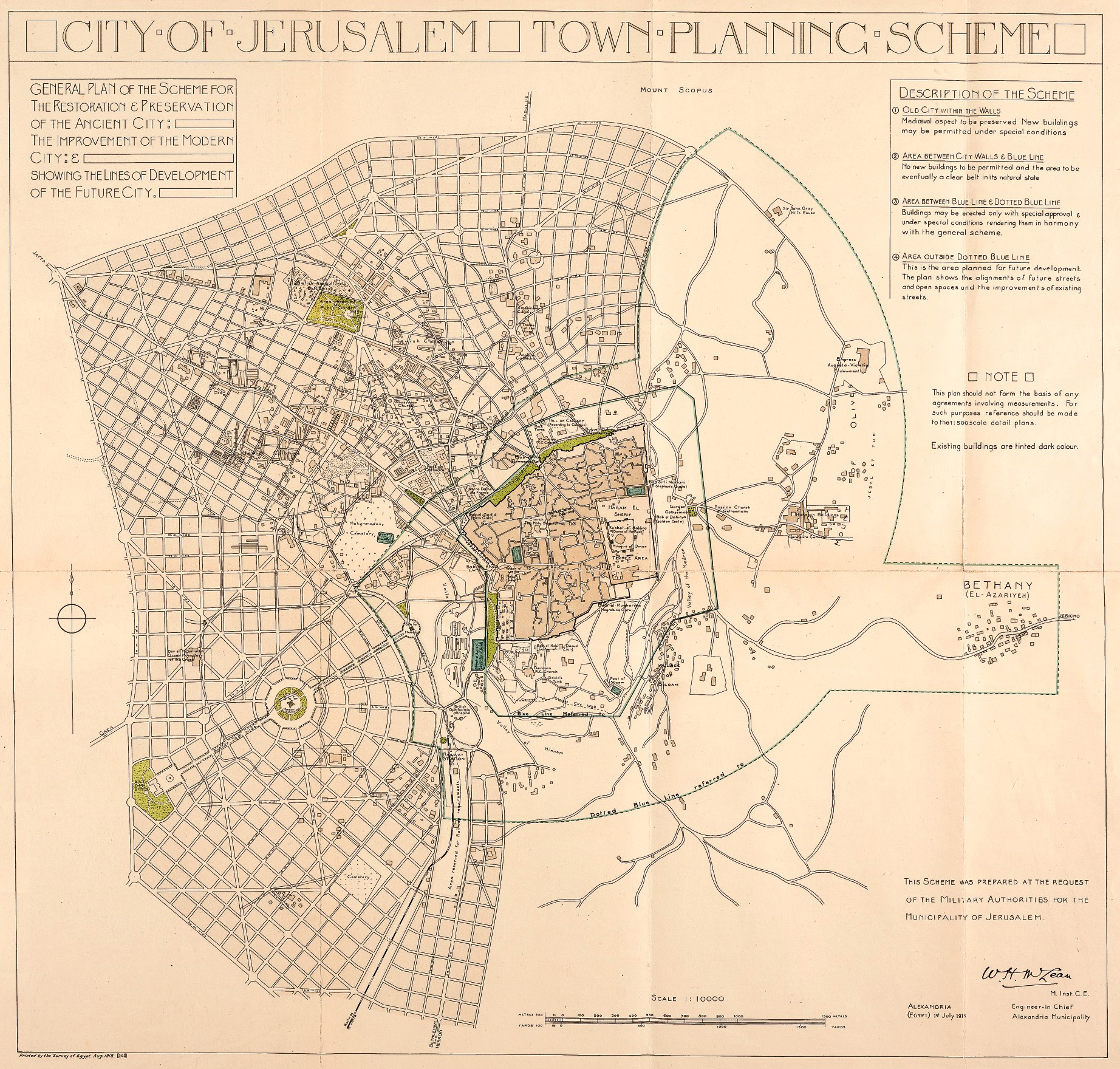
William McLean's 1918 plan was the first urban planning scheme for Jerusalem. It laid the foundations for what became West Jerusalem and East Jerusalem.

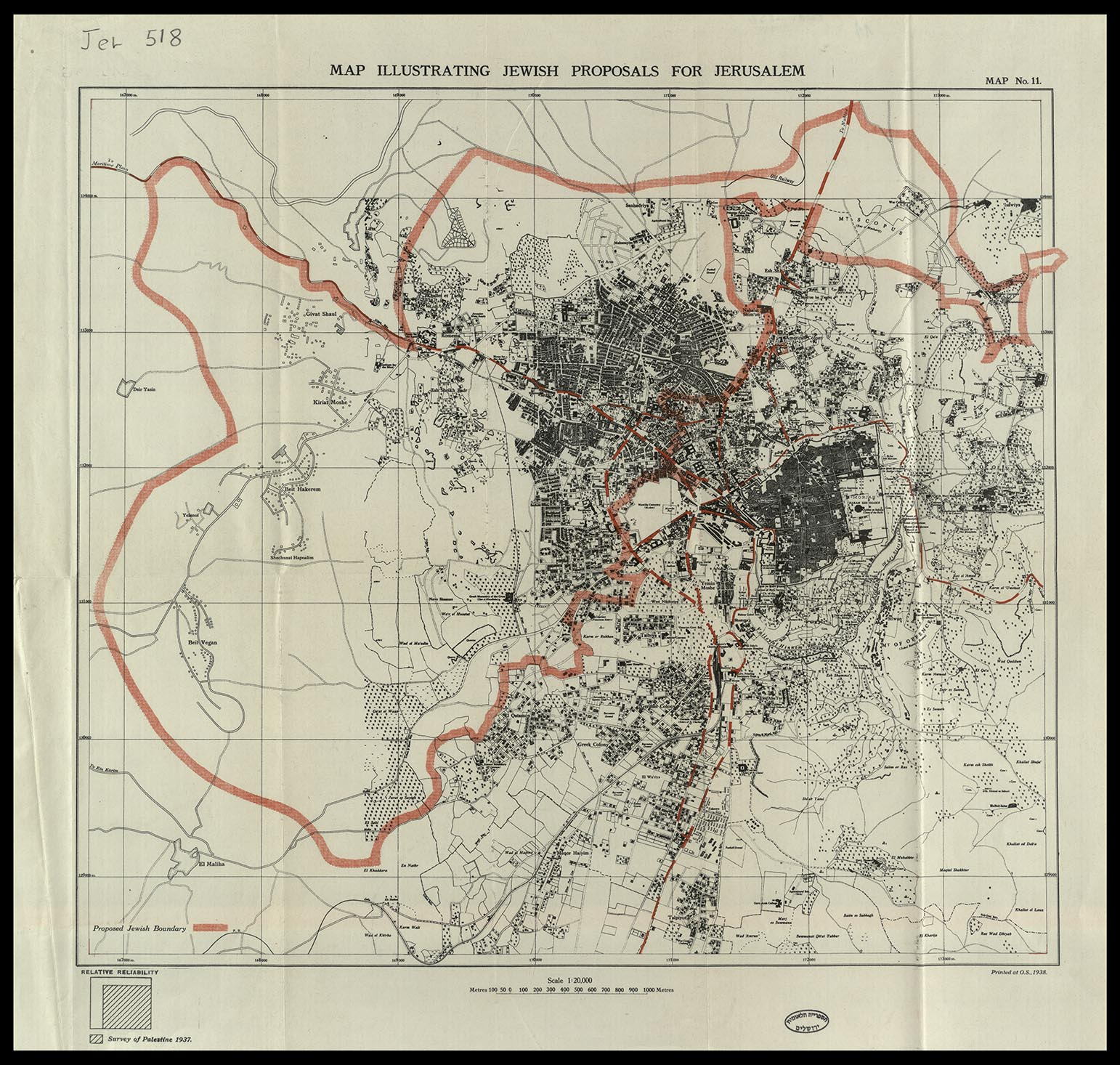
Map illustrating Jewish proposals for partition of Jerusalem, presented to the 1938 Woodhead Commission.

=== Pre 1948: the Jewish Colony ===
The earliest Jewish settlements outside the city walls were Mea Shearim and Yemin Moshe.

In 1918 William McLean laid out the first civic plan for expansion of Jerusalem westwards and southwards.

By the 1920s the Hebrew speaking Jewish community had formed a "Jewish Colony" around the area later known as the Downtown Triangle of Jaffa Road, Ben Yehuda Street and King George Street.

=== 1948 Arab–Israeli War ===
Prior to the 1948 Palestine war, the area of West Jerusalem included one of the wealthiest Arab communities, numbering some 28,000 people, in the region. By the end of hostilities, only approximately 750 non-Jews remained in the area's Arab sector, mostly Greeks in the Greek colony neighbourhood. Following the war, Jerusalem was divided into two parts: the western portion, from which it is estimated 30,000 Arabs had fled or been evicted, came under Israeli rule, while East Jerusalem came under Jordanian rule and was populated mainly by Palestinian Muslims and Christians. The Jordanians expelled a Jewish community of some 1,500 from the Old City. Moshe Salomon, a commander with the Etzioni Brigade’s Moriah Battalion, described the massive looting that took place in the Arab middle-class quarter of Qatamon:

“Everyone was swept up, privates and officers alike …. The greed for property encompassed everyone. Every home was scoured and searched, and people found in some cases produce, in others valuable objects. This rapaciousness attacked me as well and I could almost not hold myself back …. It’s hard to imagine the great riches that were found in all the homes …. I got control of myself in time and shackled my desire …. The battalion commander, his deputy, they all failed in this regard.”

After this widespread looting, Israeli institutions managed to gather in around 30,000 books, mostly in Arabic, dealing with Islamic law, Qur’anic exegesis and translations of European literature, together with thousands of works from the holdings of churches and schools. Many were taken from the homes of Palestinian writers and scholars in Qatamon, Bak'a and Musrara.

=== Division in 1949 ===
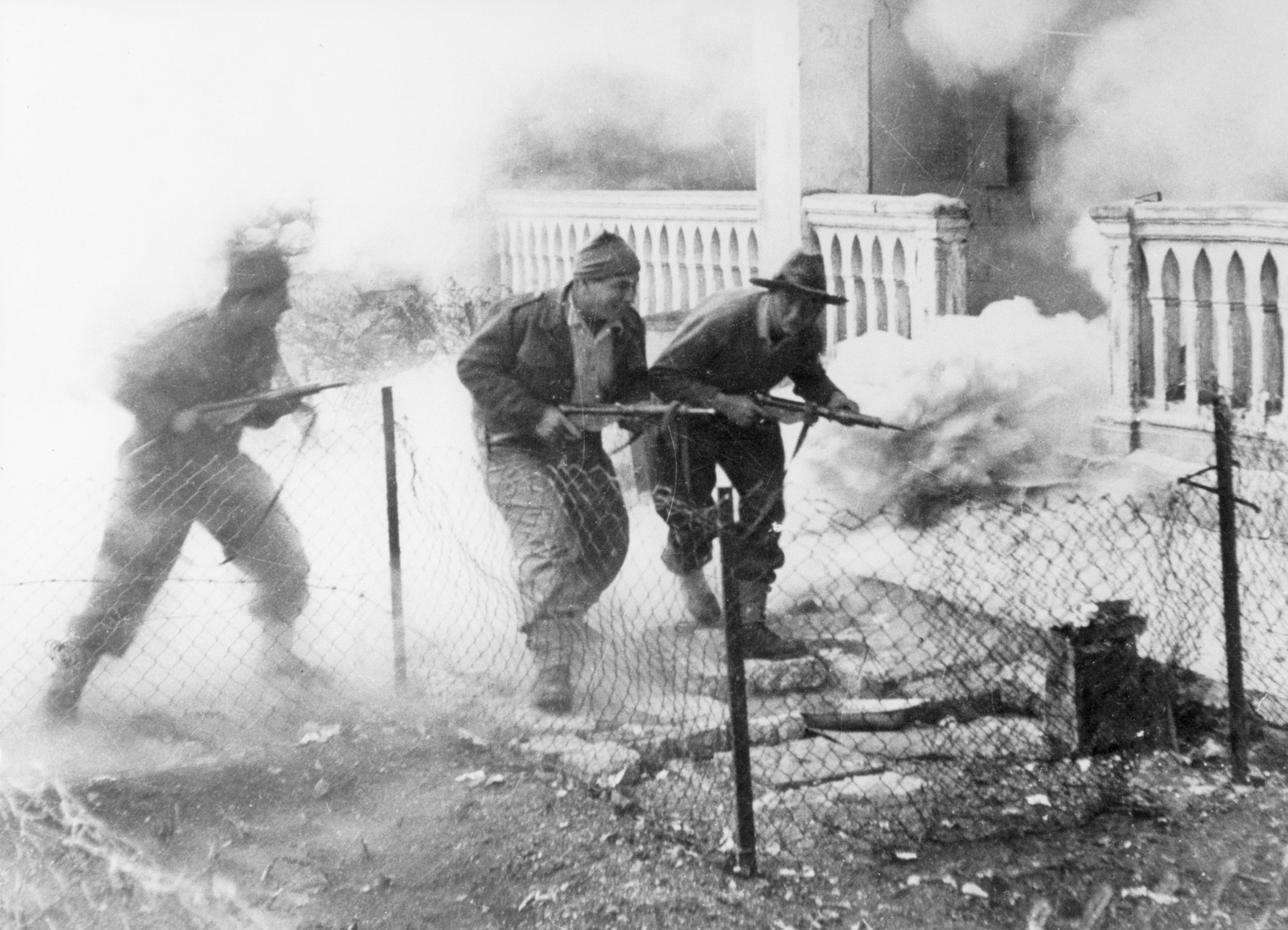
Palmach soldiers attack Arab positions at St Symeon ("San Simon") Monastery in Katamon, Jerusalem, April 1948 (battle reconstruction)

The United Nations Partition Plan for Palestine planned a "corpus separatum" for Jerusalem and its environs as an international city. In December 1949, it was officially decided to transfer the institutions of the Government of Israel to Jerusalem.

Arabs living in such western Jerusalem neighbourhoods as Katamon or Malha were forced to leave; the same fate befell Jews in the eastern areas, including the Old City of Jerusalem and Silwan. Almost 33% of the land in West Jerusalem in the pre-mandate period had been owned by Palestinians, a fact which made it hard for the evicted Palestinians to accept Israeli control in the West. The Knesset (Israeli Parliament) passed laws to transfer this Arab land to Israeli Jewish organizations.

The only eastern area of the city that remained in Israeli hands throughout the 19 years of Jordanian rule was Mount Scopus, where the Hebrew University of Jerusalem is located, which formed an enclave during that period and therefore is not considered part of East Jerusalem.

=== Capital of Israel (1950) ===
Israel established West Jerusalem as its capital in 1950. The Israeli government needed to invest heavily to create employment, building new government offices, a new university, the Great Synagogue and the Knesset building. West Jerusalem became covered by the Law and Administrative Ordinance of 1948, subjecting West Jerusalem to Israeli jurisdiction. United States President Donald Trump's administration announced recognition of Jerusalem as Israel's capital on 6 December 2017. On 6 April 2017, Russia officially recognized West Jerusalem as the capital of Israel. On 6 December 2017, the Czech Republic recognized Jerusalem as the capital. On 15 December 2018, Australia officially recognized West Jerusalem as Israel's capital, before withdrawing it again on 17 October 2022.

=== Capture of East Jerusalem (1967) ===
During the Six-Day War in June 1967, Israel captured the eastern side of the city and the whole West Bank. Over the following years, their control remained tenuous, the international community refusing to recognize their authority and the Israelis themselves not feeling secure.

In 1980, the Israeli government annexed East Jerusalem and reunified the city, but the international community disputed this. The population of Jerusalem has largely remained segregated along the city's historical east–west division. The larger city contains two populations that are "almost completely economically and politically segregated... each interacting with its separate central business district", supporting analysis that the city has retained a duocentric, as opposed to the traditional monocentric, structure.

== Commercial hubs ==
Major commercial centres of Jewish West Jerusalem include: the Downtown Triangle, Mamilla Mall, Emek Refaim, and Mahane Yehuda Market.

== Healthcare ==
One of two Hadassah hospitals in Jerusalem is located in the West Jerusalem suburb of Ein Karem. The hospital synagogue contains the famous Chagall Windows by Marc Chagall.

== Leisure facilities ==
These include Teddy Stadium and Cinema City.

== Religious centres ==
These include the Jerusalem Great Synagogue and the Heichal Shlomo.

== Mayors of West Jerusalem ==
- Dov Yosef (military governor) (1948–1949)
- Daniel Auster (1949–1950)
- Zalman Shragai (1951–1952)
- Yitzhak Kariv (1952–1955)
- Gershon Agron (1955–1959)
- Mordechai Ish-Shalom (1959–1965)
- Teddy Kollek (1965–1993)
- Ehud Olmert (1993–2003)
- Uri Lupolianski (2003–2008)
- Nir Barkat (2008–2018)
- Moshe Lion (2018–present)

== See also ==
- Jerusalem District
- Positions on Jerusalem

== Sources ==
- Amit, Gish (Summer 2011). "Salvage or Plunder? Israel's "Collection" of Private Palestinian Libraries in West Jerusalem". Journal of Palestine Studies. 40 (4): 6–23. doi:10.1525/jps.2011.xl.4.6. JSTOR 10.1525/jps.2011.xl.4.6.
- Dumper, Michael (1997). The politics of Jerusalem since 1967. Columbia University Press. ISBN 978-0-231-10640-5.
- Krystall, Nathan (1998). "The De-Arabization of West Jerusalem 1947-50". Journal of Palestine Studies. 27 (2): 5–22. doi:10.2307/2538281. JSTOR 2538281.
