= Matthew Silver (historian) =

American historian

- Born: Matthew Mark Silver; July 28, 1961; New York City, U.S.
- Died: November 9, 2025 (aged 64); Galilee, Israel
- Education: Cornell University (BA); Hebrew University of Jerusalem (MA, PhD)

Matthew Mark Silver (Hebrew: מתיו סילבר) (July 28, 1961 - November 9, 2025) was an American historian, professor at the Max Stern Yezreel Valley College and at the University of Haifa. His main subjects were Israel studies and modern Jewish history.

Matthew Silver was born in the United States, graduated from the Cornell University, and emigrated to Israel in the mid 1980s. He earned his Ph.D. in Modern Jewish History from the Hebrew University of Jerusalem. He is notable as an author of books on this topic and chronicling personalities in Modern Jewish History, notably Leon Uris, Louis Marshall and Gershon Agron.

== Books ==
- 2022: The History of Galilee, 1538–1949: Mysticism, Modernization, and War
- 2020: Zionism and the Melting Pot: Preachers, Pioneers, and Modern Jewish Politics (Jews and Judaism: History and Culture), hardcover: ISBN 978-0-8173-2062-1
- 2021: The History of Galilee, 47 BCE to 1260 CE: From Josephus and Jesus to the Crusades
- 2019: Navigating US Immigration in Modern Times: A Review and Analysis of Work Visas, hardcover: ISBN 978-0-2288-2256-1
- 2013: Louis Marshall and the Rise of Jewish Ethnicity in America: A Biography, ISBN 978-0-8156-1000-7
- 2010: Our Exodus: Leon Uris and the Americanization of Israel's Founding Story, ISBN 978-0-8143-3443-0
- 2006: First Contact: Origins of the American-Israeli Connection; Halutzim from America During the Palestine Mandate, ISBN 978-0-938609-58-2
