= Mordechai Ish-Shalom =

Israeli politician and labor leader (1902–1991)

- מרדכי איש-שלום
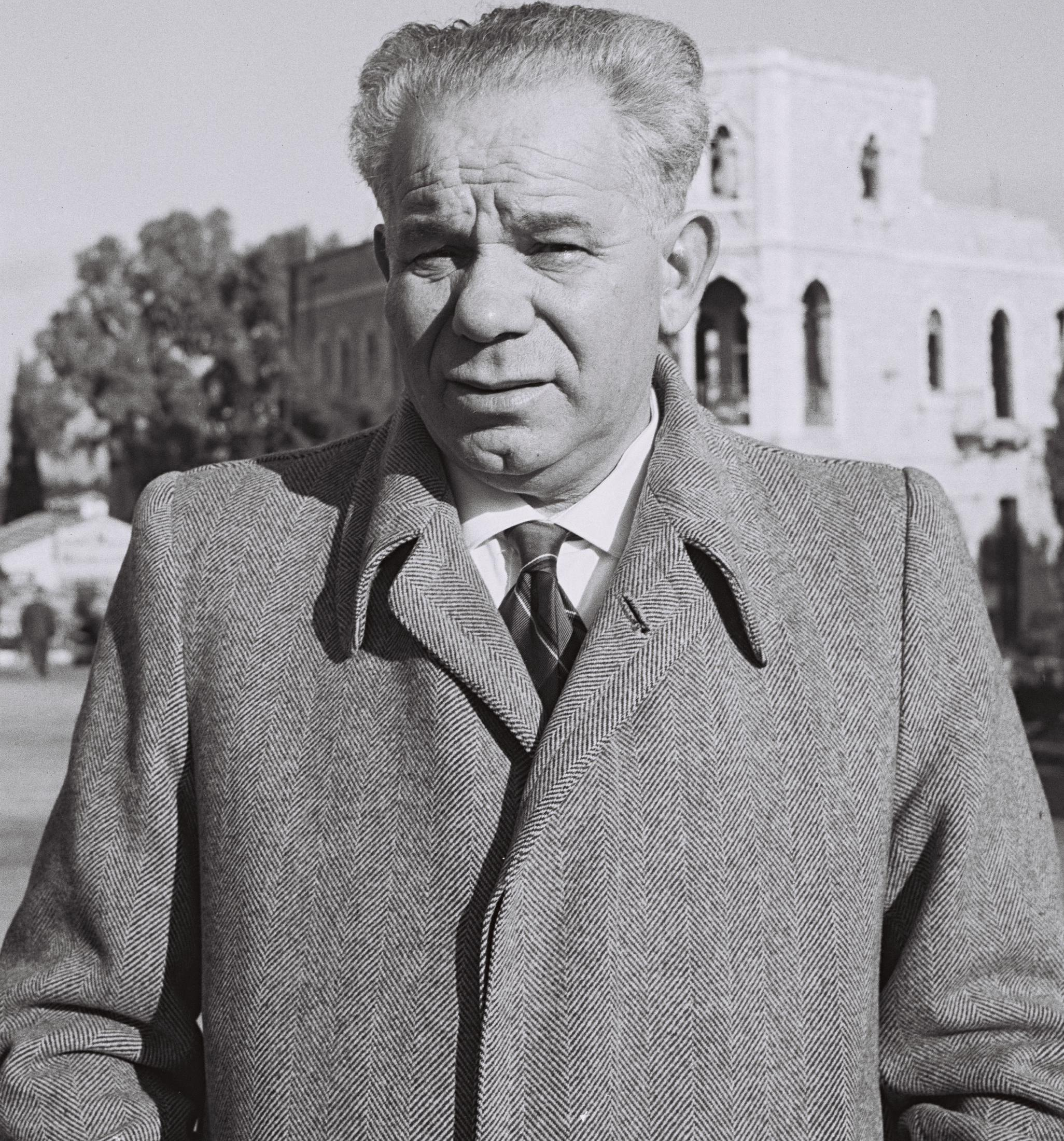

Mayor of Jerusalem
- In office 1 November 1959 – 29 November 1965
- Preceded by: Gershon Agron
- Succeeded by: Teddy Kollek

Personal details
- Born: 1902 Lithuania, Russian Empire
- Died: 21 February 1991 (age 88 or 89) (Note: The New York Times reports his birth year as 1902 yet gives his age when he died in 1991 as 90.) Jerusalem, Israel
- Party: Mapai

Mordechai Ish-Shalom (Hebrew: מרדכי איש-שלום; 1902–1991), was an Israeli politician and labor leader. He was the Mayor of West Jerusalem from 1959 to 1965.

== Biography ==
Mordechai Ish-Shalom was born in Lithuania during the reign of the Russian Empire. He immigrated to Mandate Palestine in 1923. His labor career began in the Stonecutters' Union in 1935; he then rose through the ranks of the Histadrut, the Israeli trade union congress.

== Mayor ==
Six rounds of voting for mayor occurred on 23 September 1952, before the council voted 12 to 9 in favour of Yitzhak Kariv against Ish-Shalom.

Mayor Gershon Agron was head of Mapai's list in the 1959 municipal elections, with Ish-Shalom second. However, Agron died two days before the election and Ish-Shalom became Mapai's mayoral candidate. Mapai increased its number of councilors from 6 to 8 and their alliance with Ahdut HaAvoda gave them 9 seats. Ish-Shalom was elected mayor after the council voted 12 to 7 for him against Menachem Porush on 15 December. His election, along with Mordechai Namir as mayor of Tel Aviv and Abba Hushi as mayor of Haifa, meant that Mapai controlled the mayoralties of Israel's three largest cities for the first time.

Ish-Shalom expanded his coalition on the city council to 16 seats, with 5 in opposition, by adding Religious Torah List.

In 1964, Ish-Shalom established an interdisciplinary professional team to plan the modernization of Jerusalem.

== Later life ==
In the 1970s, he was instrumental in the development of Kiryat Wolfson, a five-tower high-rise project overlooking Sacher Park.

== Death ==
Ish-Shalom died on 21 February 1991.

== Works cited ==
- Weitz, Yechiam (2022). "Municipal Elections in the Holy City: Campaigns, Results, and Coalition Building in Jerusalem, 1948–1973". Israel Studies. 27 (3). Indiana University Press: 143–165. doi:10.2307/48683547. JSTOR 48683547.
