= David Stoliar =

Sole survivor of the Struma disaster

David Stoliar (31 October 1922 – 1 May 2014) was the sole survivor of the Struma disaster, in which the Shch-213 torpedoed and sank the Holocaust refugee ship MV Struma in the Black Sea in the early morning of 24 February 1942. All of the other estimated 781 Jewish refugees and 10 crew were killed.

== Early life ==
Stoliar was born in Chișinău, Bessarabia, which at the time was part of Romania, to a Jewish family, the son of Yaakov and Bella Stoliar. The Stoliars lived in Chișinău until 1927, when David and his parents moved to France to join one of Yaakov's brothers, a hotelier in Vence in Provence. In 1932 the Stoliars returned to Romania, where Jacob took a job with another of David's uncles, who ran a textile factory. In 1932 David's parents divorced and his mother returned to France, settling with her brother in Paris. She took David with her to Paris but Yaakov remained in Bucharest. David was at school at a boarding collège in Fontainebleau until 1936, when Yaakov had him return to Bucharest. David's mother remained in France, where she remarried. David went to school at a Liceu in Bucharest, spending his summer holidays with his mother in Paris. In 1940 the Liceu expelled David for being Jewish, after which he briefly attended a Liceu set up by the Bucharest Jewish community. By the end of 1940 the Romanian authorities deported David to a forced labour camp at Poligon near Bucharest.

== Struma voyage and disaster ==
In 1941 Yaakov bought David a ticket to travel on the Struma, an elderly motor schooner that was bound for Mandatory Palestine. Yaakov got him released from the labour camp and bribed Romanian officials to issue Stoliar a passport. On 12 December 1941 David sailed from Constanța aboard the Struma, but her engine repeatedly failed and three days later a Turkish tug towed her into Istanbul. At the UK's behest, Turkey held Struma at anchor in Istanbul without allowing her passengers to disembark. Negotiations between Turkey and Britain over the fate of the refugees seemed to reach an impasse, and on 23 February 1942 Turkish authorities boarded Struma, towed her back into the Black Sea with her engine still inoperable and cast her adrift.

The next morning, Soviet submarine Shch-213 commanded by D.M. Denezhko sank Struma with a single torpedo. Stoliar survived the blast and clung to a floating piece of deck, and later was joined by the ship's First Officer, who was Bulgarian. Stoliar later claimed the officer told him that he saw the torpedo before it sank the Struma. The officer died overnight.

After his rescue Stoliar was detained in Turkey for almost two months before being released and granted a visa to Palestine. British authorities in Palestine interviewed him about the Struma sinking. After undergoing six months of physical therapy, Stoliar went to Cairo and enlisted in the British Army, serving in the 8th Army in North Africa. He served in the British Army for almost four years, becoming a squadron quartermaster sergeant.

== After the war ==
Stoliar's father Yaakov survived the Second World War. They learned that in 1942 the authorities in German-occupied France had deported David's mother, along with her stepson by her second marriage, to their deaths in the Auschwitz-Birkenau concentration camp. David married his first wife, Adria, in 1945, by whom he had a son, and served in the Israel Defense Forces in the 1948 Arab–Israeli War, fighting on the Syrian front as a machine gunner.

After the war Stoliar worked in the oil industry and in shoe manufacturing. Adria died in 1961 and he married his second wife, Marda, in 1968. He lived in Japan for 18 years before moving to the United States. He became a naturalized US citizen in 1983. He and Marda settled in Bend, Oregon. He died on 1 May 2014 at the age of 91.
