= Struma disaster =

1942 maritime attack in the Black Sea

- Location: 41°23′N 29°13′E
- Date: 24 February 1942
- Target: The ship Struma, carrying Jewish refugees from Romania to the British Mandate of Palestine
- Attack type: Ship sinking
- Weapon: torpedo
- Deaths: 781 refugees, 10 crew members
- Perpetrator: Soviet Navy

The Struma disaster was the sinking on 24 February 1942 of the ship MV Struma which had been trying to take nearly 800 Jewish refugees from the Axis member Romania to Mandatory Palestine. She was a small iron-hulled ship of only 240 GRT and had been built in 1867 as a steam-powered schooner but had recently been re-engined with an unreliable second-hand diesel engine. Struma was only 148.4 ft (45 m) long, had a beam of only 19.3 ft (6 m) and a draught of only 9.9 ft (3 m) but an estimated 781 refugees and 10 crew were crammed into her.

Struma's diesel engine failed several times between her departure from Constanța on the Black Sea on 12 December 1941 and her arrival in Istanbul on 15 December. She had to be towed by a tug boat to leave Constanța and to enter Istanbul. On 23 February 1942, with her engine still inoperative and her refugee passengers aboard, Turkish authorities towed Struma from Istanbul through the Bosporus out to the coast of Şile, in North Istanbul. Within hours, on the morning of 24 February, the Shch-213 torpedoed her, killing 781 refugees and 10 crew, which made it the Black Sea's largest exclusively-civilian naval disaster of World War II. Until recently, the number of victims had been estimated at 768, but the current figure is the result of a recent study of six different passenger lists. Only one person aboard, the 19-year-old David Stoliar, survived (he died in 2014).

== Voyage and detention ==
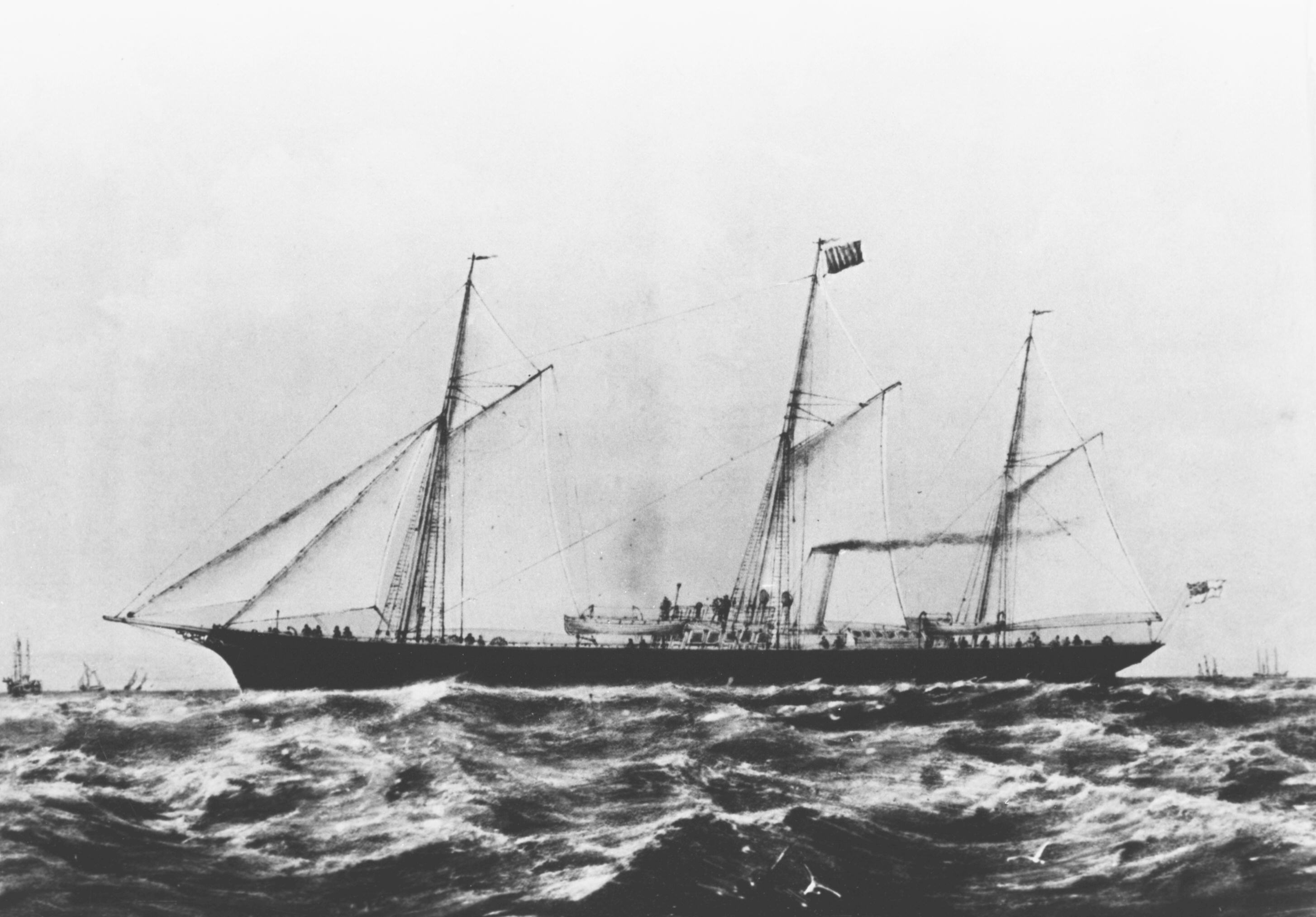
Struma about 1890

Struma had been built as a luxury yacht but was 74 years old. In the 1930s, she had been relegated to carrying cattle on the Danube River under the flag of convenience of Panama. The Mossad LeAliyah Bet intended to use her as a refugee ship to sail to British-controlled Palestine but shelved the plan after German forces entered Bulgaria. Her Greek owner, Jean D. Pandelis, instead contacted Revisionist Zionists in Romania. The New Zionist Organization and a Zionist youth movement, Betar, began to make arrangements, but an argument over the choice of passengers left the planning in the hands of Betar.

Apart from the crew and 60 Betar youth, there were over 700 passengers, who had paid large fees to board the ship. The exact number is not certain, but a collation of six separate lists produced a total of 791 passengers and 10 crew. Passengers were told they would be sailing on a renovated boat with a short stop in Istanbul to collect their Palestinian immigration visas. Romanian Prime Minister Ion Antonescu's government approved of the voyage.

Each refugee was allowed to take 20 kilograms (44 lb) of luggage. Romanian customs officers took many of the refugees' valuables and other possessions, along with food that they had brought with them. The passengers were not permitted to see the vessel before the day of the voyage. They found that she was a wreck with only two lifeboats. Below decks, Struma had dormitories with bunks for 40 to 120 people in each. The berths were bunks on which passengers were to sleep four abreast, with a width of 60 centimetres (2 ft) for each person.

On 12 December 1941, the day of her sailing, Struma's engine failed and so a tug towed her out of the port of Constanța. Since the waters off Constanța were mined, a Romanian vessel escorted her clear of the minefield. She then drifted overnight while her crew tried vainly to start her engine. She transmitted distress signals, and on 13 December, the Romanian tug returned. The tug's crew said they would not repair Struma's engine unless they were paid. The refugees had no money after they had bought their tickets and leaving Romania and so they gave all their wedding rings to the tugboatmen, who then repaired the engine. Struma then got under way, but by 15 December, her engine had failed again and so she was towed into the port of Istanbul, Turkey.

There, she remained at anchor, while British diplomats and Turkish officials negotiated over the fate of the passengers. The Turkish government of Prime Minister Refik Saydam refused to accept Jewish refugees into Turkey, with Saydam once stating that his country "would not accept masses of Jews, nor individual Jews who were oppressed in other countries." Turkish officials informed their British counterparts that they would not allow Struma's passengers to land unless Britain permitted them to emigrate to Palestine. As the passengers were attempting to illegally immigrate to Palestine in violation of the restrictions laid out in the White Paper of 1939, British diplomats informed the Turkish government no such permission would be given. While she was detained in Istanbul, Struma ran short of food. Soup was cooked twice a week, and supper was typically an orange and some peanuts for each person. At night, each child was issued a serving of milk.

Following weeks of negotiation, the British agreed to honour the expired Palestinian immigration visas that a few passengers possessed, allowing them to travel to Palestine overland. With the help of several sympathetic residents of Istanbul, a few passengers managed to escape into Turkey. One woman, Madeea Solomonovici, was admitted to an Istanbul hospital after she had miscarried. On 12 February, British officials agreed that passengers aged between 11 and 16 would be given Palestinian visas, but a dispute occurred over their transportation to Palestine. According to some researchers, a total of 9 passengers disembarked, and the remaining 782 and 10 crew stayed on the ship. Others believe that there had only been 782 passengers initially, with only Solomonovici being allowed to leave the ship.

== Towing to sea and sinking ==
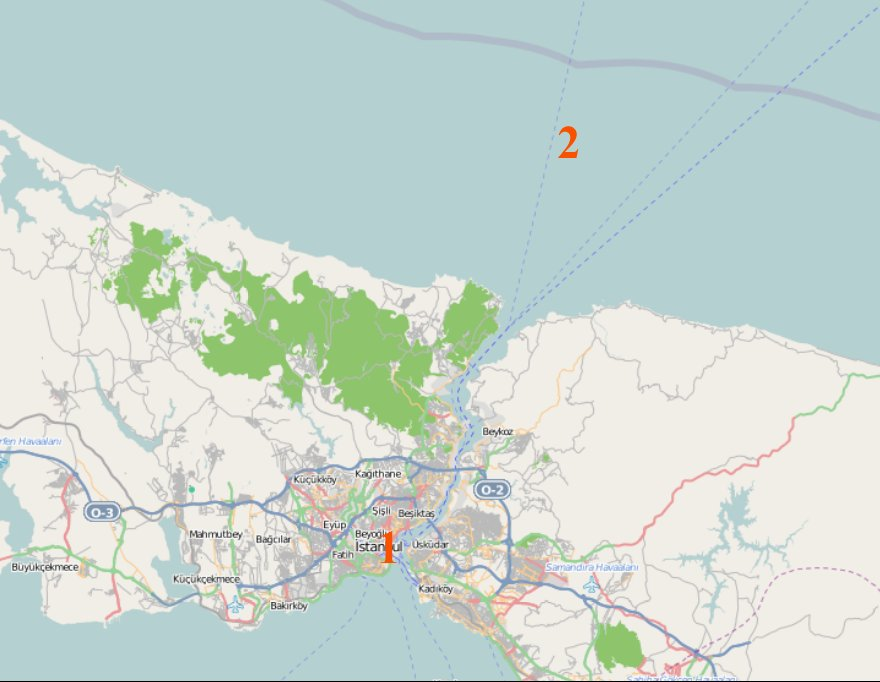
Map of the Bosporus Strait showing where Struma was anchored in quarantine in Istanbul Harbour (1) and was later torpedoed and sunk in the Black Sea (2)

The Anglo-Turkish negotiations reached an impasse, as neither side would relent. On 23 February 1942, a small group of Turkish policemen tried to board the ship, but the refugees resisted their attempts to board. A larger force of about 80 police officers subsequently surrounded Struma with motor boats, and after about half an hour of resistance managed to board the ship. Despite weeks of work by Turkish engineers, the engine would not start, and Struma was unable to move without being towed. The police detached the ship's anchor and attached her to a tug, which towed her through the Bosporus and out into the Black Sea.

As she was towed along the Bosporus, many passengers hung signs over the sides that read "SAVE US" in English and Hebrew that were visible to those who lived on the banks of the strait. The Turkish authorities abandoned the ship in the Black Sea, about ten nautical miles (20 kilometres) north of the Bosporus, where she drifted helplessly. On the morning of 24 February there was a huge explosion, and the ship sank. Decades later, it was revealed that the ship had been torpedoed by the Soviet Navy submarine Shch-213, which had also sunk the Turkish vessel Çankaya the evening before.

Struma sank quickly, and many people were trapped below decks and drowned. Many others aboard survived the sinking and clung to pieces of wreckage, but for hours, no rescue came, and all but one of them died from drowning or hypothermia. Of the estimated 791 people killed, more than 100 were children. Struma's First Officer Lazar Dikof and the 19-year-old refugee David Stoliar clung to a cabin door, which was floating in the sea. The First Officer died overnight, but Turks in a rowing boat rescued Stoliar the next day. He was the only survivor.

Turkey held Stoliar in custody for many weeks. Simon Brod, a Jewish businessman from Istanbul who during World War II helped rescue several Jewish refugees who reached Turkey, arranged for Stoliar to be fed during his two-month incarceration. Upon his release, Brod brought Stoliar home and provided him with fresh clothes, a suitcase and a train ticket to Aleppo after the British government had given him papers to go to Palestine. Stoliar later joined the British Army and served in the Eighth Army during the North African campaign.

== Aftermath ==
On 9 June 1942, Lord Wedgwood, a prominent Zionist, opened the debate in the House of Lords by alleging that the British government had reneged on its commitment towards the establishment of a Jewish homeland in Palestine and urged for the mandate over Palestine to be transferred to the United States. He stated during his speech: "I hope yet to live to see those who sent the Struma cargo back to the Nazis hung as high as Haman cheek by jowl with their prototype and Führer, Adolf Hitler". In response to the disaster, the Anglo-Jewish poet Emanuel Litvinoff, who was then serving in the Pioneer Corps, wrote a poem mourning the sinking of Struma, which included the lines:

Today my khaki is a badge of shame,
Its duty meaningless; my name
Is Moses and I summon plague to Pharaoh.
Today my mantle is Sorrow and O
My crown is Thorn. I sit darkly with the years

And centuries of years, bowed by my heritage of tears.

For many years, there were competing theories about the explosion that sank Struma. In 1964, a German historian discovered that Shch-213 had fired a torpedo, which sank the ship. That was later confirmed from several other Soviet sources. The submarine had been acting under secret orders to sink all neutral and enemy shipping entering the Black Sea to reduce the flow of strategic material to Nazi Germany. Frantz and Collins call the sinking of Struma the "largest naval civilian disaster of the war". Greater numbers of civilians perished in other maritime disasters of the war, including MV Wilhelm Gustloff, SS Cap Arcona and Jun'yō Maru, but there were also military personnel aboard those ships when they sunk.

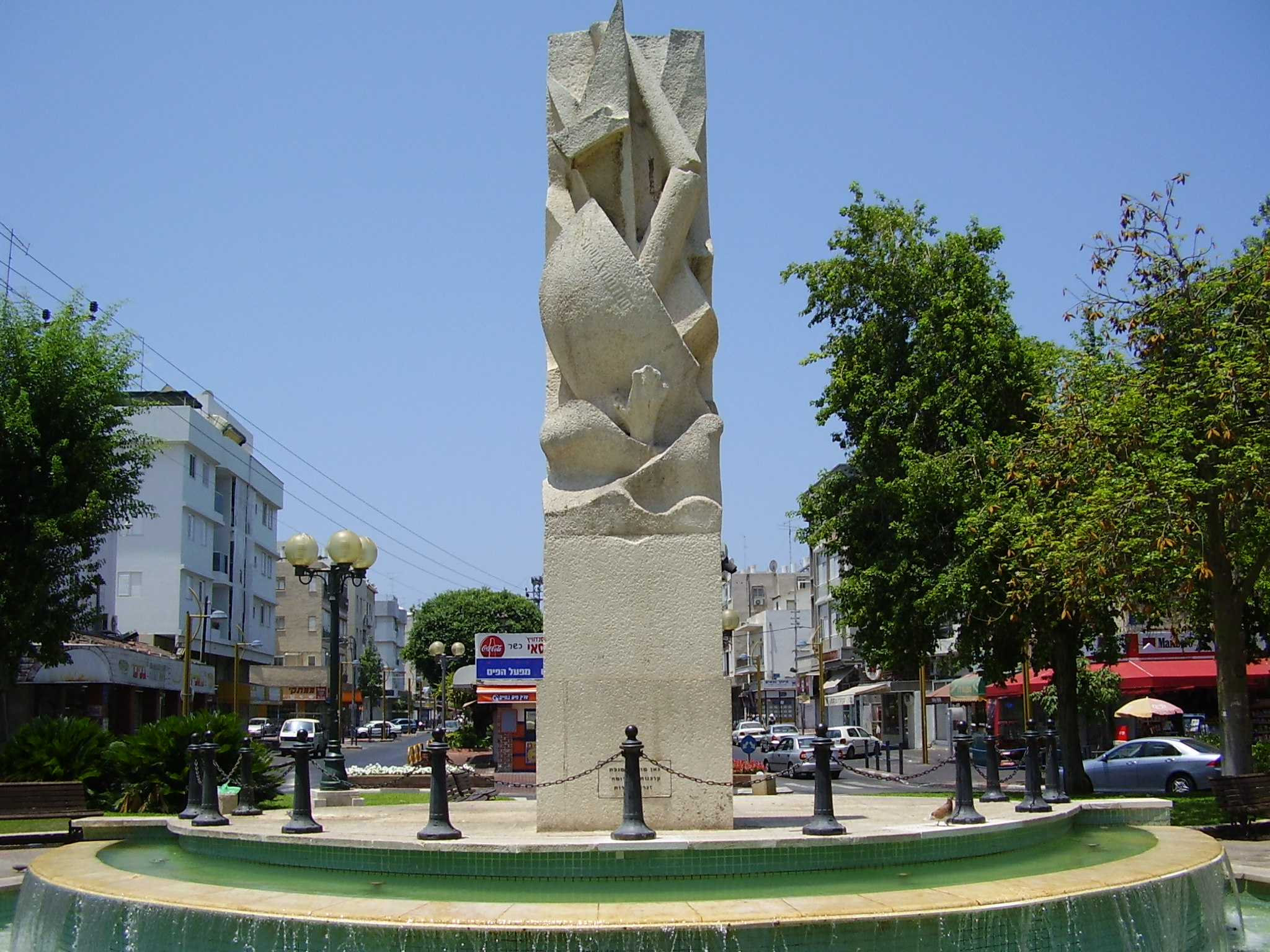
Struma monument in Holon, Israel

On 26 January 2005, the Israeli Prime Minister Ariel Sharon made a speech to the Knesset in which he stated:

The leadership of the British Mandate displayed... obtuseness and insensitivity by locking the gates to Israel to Jewish refugees who sought a haven in the Land of Israel. Thus were rejected the requests of the 769 [sic] passengers of the ship Struma who escaped from Europe – and all but one [of the passengers] found their death at sea. Throughout the war, nothing was done to stop the annihilation [of the Jewish people].

== Wrecks ==
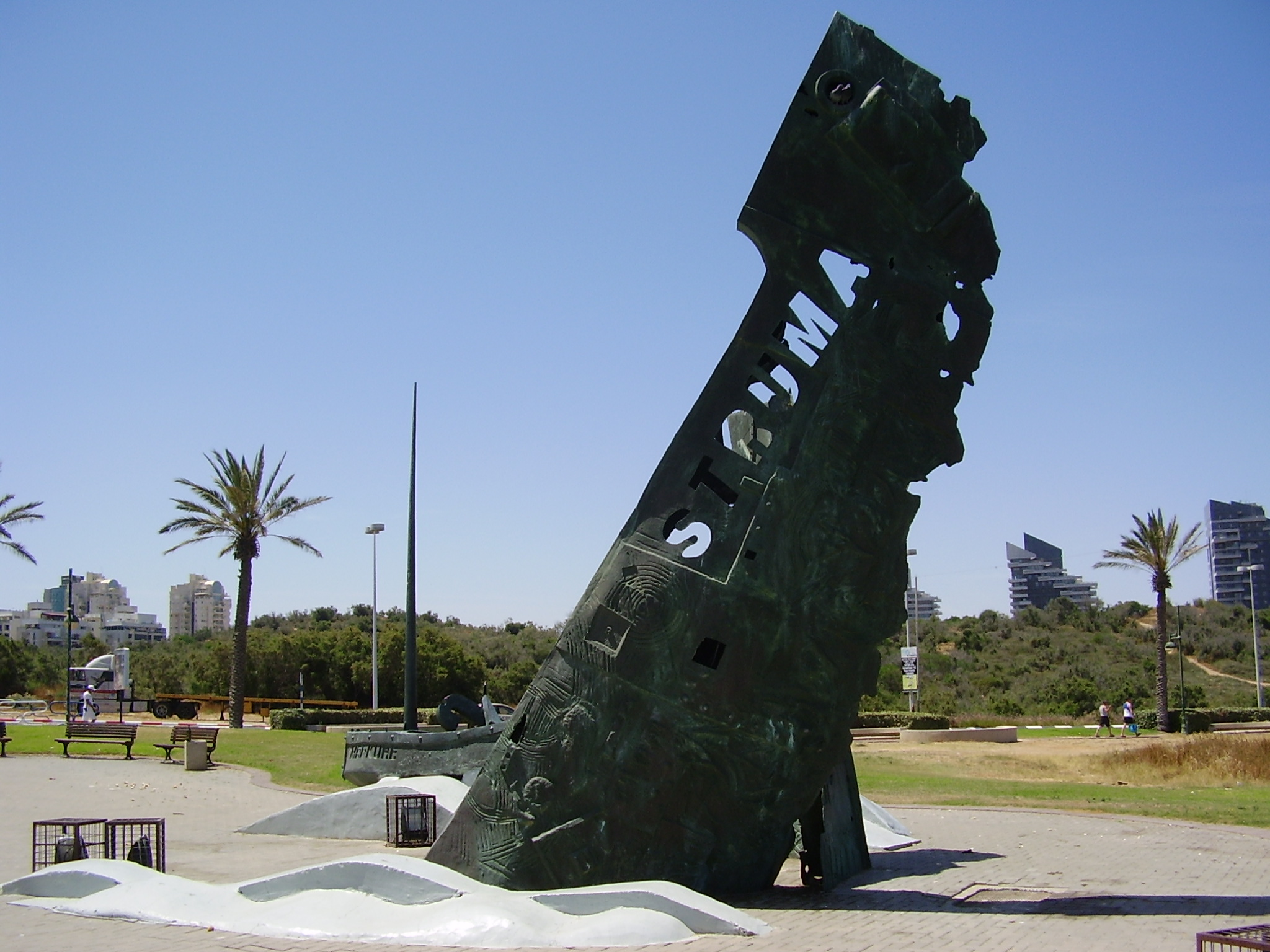
Struma monument in Ashdod, Israel

=== Struma ===
In July 2000, a Turkish diving team found a wreck on the sea floor in about the right place and announced that it had found Struma. A team, led by a British technical diver and a grandson of one of the victims, Greg Buxton, later studied that and several other wrecks in the area but could not positively identify any as Struma since the wreck that had been found by the Turks was far too large.

On 3 September 2000, a ceremony was held at the site to commemorate the tragedy. It was attended by 60 relatives of Struma victims, representatives of the Jewish community of Turkey, the Israeli ambassador and prime minister's envoy and British and American delegates, but David Stoliar chose to not attend for family reasons.

=== Soviet Shch-213 submarine ===
In November 2008, a team of Dutch, German and Romanian divers of the Black Sea Wreck Diving Club discovered the wreck of Shch-213 off the coast of Constanța in Romania. Since the registration markings that could have helped to identify the wreck were missing because of damage to the submarine, it took divers until 2010 to identify her as Shch-213.

== See also ==
- Lord Moyne
- SS Exodus – a former US packet ship carrying 4,515 Jewish refugees who were denied entry to Palestine in 1947.
- SS Patria — a French-built civilian liner which was sunk after Haganah sabotage in a failed attempt to prevent the deportation of 1800 Jewish refugees aboard from Mandatory Palestine. 267 died.
- MV Mefküre – a Turkish ship carrying 350 Jewish refugees that was torpedoed and sunk on 5 August 1944 by USSR submarine Shch 215.
- SS Navemar – a Spanish cargo liner designed for 28 passengers that took 1,120 Jewish refugees to New York in a seven-week voyage in 1941.
- MS St. Louis – a German passenger liner carrying 937 Jewish refugees who were denied entry to Cuba, the USA and Canada in 1939.
- Le Grand Akshan
- List by death toll of ships sunk by submarines

== Sources ==
- Druks, Herbert (2000). The Uncertain Friendship: The US and Israel from Roosevelt to Kennedy. Contributions to the Study of World History. Westport, CT: Greenwood Press. pages 74–76 and note 26 on page 116. ISBN 9780313314230.
- Enghelberg, Hedi (2013). The Last Witness – The Sinking of SS/MV Struma, Feb. 24th, 1942. Fort Lauderdale: Eng Publishing. ISBN 9781605851297.
- Frantz, Douglas; Collins, Catherine (2003). Death on the Black Sea: The Untold Story of the Struma and World War II's Holocaust at Sea. London: HarperCollins. ISBN 0-06-621262-6.
- Ofer, Dalia (1990). Escaping the Holocaust – Illegal Immigration to the Land of Israel, 1939–1944. New York: Oxford University Press. pp. 149–171. ISBN 0-19-506340-6.
