= Soviet submarine Shch-213 =

Soviet Navy Shchuka-class submarine

History

Soviet Union
- Name: Shch-213
- Builder: Sudostroytelnyi zavod imeny 61 kommunara, Mykolaiv, USSR
- Yard number: 1037
- Laid down: 4 December 1934
- Launched: 13 April 1937
- Commissioned: 31 October 1938
- Fate: Sunk by sea mine, 14 October 1942

General characteristics
- Class & type: Shchuka-class submarine, Type X
- Displacement: 577 tons surfaced; 704 tons submerged
- Length: 57.00 m (187 ft 0 in)
- Beam: 6.20 m (20 ft 4 in)
- Draught: 3.78 m (12 ft 5 in)
- Propulsion: 2 shaft diesel electric, 1,020 kW (1,370 bhp) diesel, 600 kilowatts (800 bhp) electric
- Speed: 12.5 knots (23.2 km/h; 14.4 mph) on the surface; 6.3 knots (11.7 km/h; 7.2 mph) submerged
- Range: 6,000 nautical miles (11,000 km; 6,900 mi) at 8 knots (15 km/h; 9.2 mph)
- Test depth: 91 m (300 ft)
- Complement: 38
- Armament: 4 × bow torpedo tubes; 2 × stern torpedo tubes; 10 torpedoes; 2 × 45 mm (1.8 in) semi-automatic guns

Щ-213 (transliterated as Shch-213 or sometimes SC-213) was a Soviet Navy Shchuka-class submarine, Type X. She was built at the Sudostroytelnyi zavod imeny 61 kommunara in Mykolaiv, Ukrainian SSR, and entered service in October 1938 with the Soviet Black Sea fleet.

In February 1942, Shch-213 was responsible for the sinking of MV Struma in the Struma disaster. In October 1942, Shch-213 struck a sea mine and sank with all hands.

== Service history ==
=== Secret orders ===
Shch-213 had secret orders to sink all neutral and enemy shipping entering the Black Sea, to reduce the flow of strategic materials to Nazi Germany. On 23 February 1942 she had sunk the 464 GRT Turkish schooner Çankaya west-north-west of the Bosphorus with gunfire.

=== Struma disaster ===
MV Struma had left the Romanian port of Constanța in December 1941 carrying an estimated 781 Jewish refugees in an attempt to reach Mandatory Palestine. Turkish authorities had detained Struma and her passengers in Istanbul for 10 weeks because hardly any of them had obtained visas to enter Palestine, and the British authorities insisted that under their policy for Jewish immigration to Palestine they would not permit the remainder to do so. Struma's engine had failed when leaving Romania and again when approaching Turkey, and despite attempted repairs in Istanbul it was still inoperable.

On 23 February 1942 a Turkish tug towed Struma back out into the Black Sea and cast her adrift about 10 miles (16 km) off the Turkish coast. Early on the morning of 24 February Shch-213, commanded by DM Denezhko, fired a single torpedo which quickly sank Struma. Many passengers were trapped below decks and drowned. Many others aboard survived the sinking and clung to pieces of wreckage, but for hours no rescue came and all but one of them died from drowning or hypothermia. The only survivor was a 19-year-old refugee called David Stoliar, who was rescued the next day by the crew of a Turkish rowing boat.

Initially it was believed a stray mine had sunk Struma, but in the 1960s the German historian Jürgen Rohwer established that SC-213 had done so.

Soviet authorities commended Shch-213's crew for sinking Struma:

The Shch-213 submarine... encountered on the morning of 24 February 1942 an unprotected enemy vessel Struma... The ship was successfully torpedoed from a distance of [1,118 meters] and sunk... Junior officers... Unit Commander and non-commissioned officers... and the Red Fleet sailor who fired the torpedo... have shown courage. (Soviet Military Archives)

=== Further action ===
On 2 March 1942 Shch-213 fired a torpedo at an unidentified merchant vessel northeast of the Bosphorus but missed. The next day the submarine fired a torpedo at the Turkish sailing vessel Adana east-north-east of the Bosphorus but again missed her target.

On 14 October 1942, off the coast of Tulcea, Romania, a torpedo narrowly missed Kriegsmarine U-Jäger ("Submarine chaser") UJ-116. Shch-213 may have been the attacker. UJ-116 responded by firing depth charges. For many years it was believed that the Shch-213 was sunk in this confrontation. In fact Shch-213 struck a mine, whose detonation sank her with all hands lost.

Ships sunk by Shch-213
Date	Ship	Flag	Tonnage	Notes
23 February 1942	Cankaya	(Turkey)	464 GRT	sailing vessel (gunfire)
24 February 1942	Struma	(Panama)	169 GRT	evacuation ship (torpedo)
Total:			633 GRT	

== Wreck ==
On 15 November 2008 the submarine was discovered 12 miles (19 km) off the coast from Constanța by divers from Aquarius dive center (2 Romanian and 1 Dutch). The identification of SC-213 was announced on 23 August 2010 to the Romanian authorities and representatives of the Russian Federation in Romania. Damage to the submarine was consistent with her having struck a mine. The explosion had destroyed her registration markings, so it wasn't until 2010 that Harry Bakker and his team identified the submarine.
