= Hassia Levy-Agron =

Israeli dancer (1923–2001)

- חסיה לוי־אגרון
- Born: Hassia Levy; 2 December 1923; Jerusalem, Mandatory Palestine
- Died: 22 August 2001 (aged 77); Jerusalem, Israel
- Spouse: Dani Agron
- Relatives: Rivlin family Agron family (by marriage)

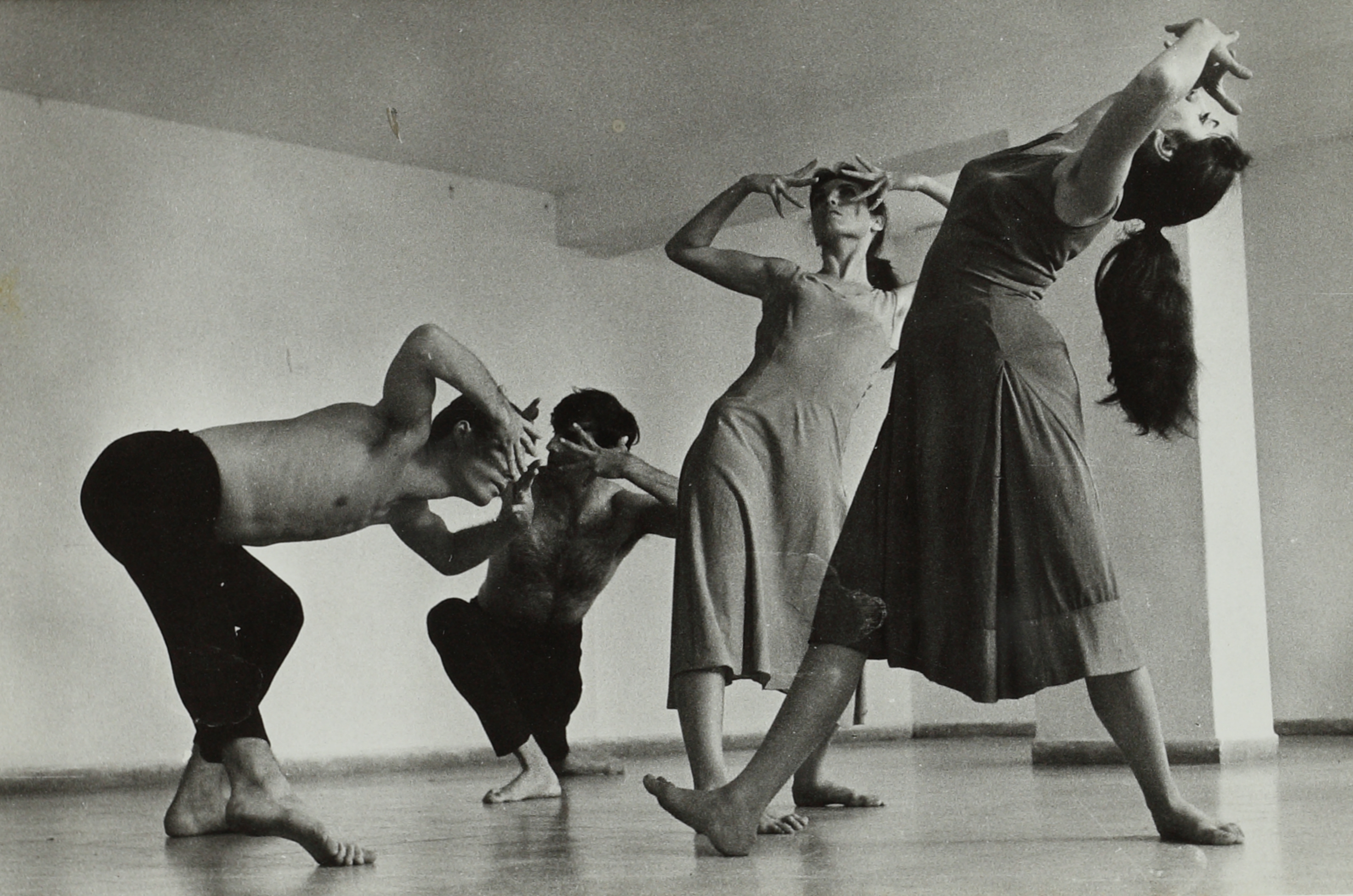
Dancers in Agron's studio, 1960s

Hassia Levy-Agron (Hebrew: חסיה לוי־אגרון; 2 December 1923 – 22 August 2001) was an Israeli dancer, choreographer, and educator.

== Early life ==
Hassia Levy was born in Jerusalem on 2 December 1923, to Elisheva Rivlin and Hayyim Leib Levy, a board member of the Anglo-Palestine Bank. A seventh-generation Jewish Jerusalemite, she was descended from two prominent families: her paternal grandfather co-founded Tel Aviv, and this line of the family had immigrated from Russia in the First Aliyah, while her mother was part of the Rivlin family.

Levy-Agron began dancing in 1928, attending a kindergarten with rhythmic classes run by Levin Kipnis. She then joined the Lämel School (often misspelled 'Lemel School'), where she received instruction from dancers based in Tel Aviv; these instructors "were certain that [she] was born to dance". Reflecting on her childhood lessons in 1989, Levy-Agron said that she learned a lot of creativity and improvisation. However, at the time most dance teachers were immigrants who worked in Tel Aviv, and her Lemel teachers soon stopped commuting; Levy-Agron studied under other instructors, all of whom encouraged her, until one helped her go to Tel Aviv to study under Gertrud Kraus. Her parents were not so encouraging of dance, but she continued.

In the early 1940s, Levy-Agron performed in variety shows, receiving warm critical reviews. She began giving solo shows, and crafting nights of cultural recital involving dance, drama, and music. She then traveled to New York to study under Martha Graham, but returned to Israel in 1948 during the war in Palestine. She was the first Israeli-born dancer to train in the United States, doing so under Graham and at the Juilliard School.

=== Military service ===
In 1948, Levy-Agron began performing for the Israeli troops to boost morale. As part of her service, after the war in Palestine, the American Jewish Joint Distribution Committee sent her to Europe to perform at Displaced persons camps, for post-World War II European Jews who had not been resettled.

== Career ==
In 1951, Levy-Agron started the dance program of the Jerusalem Conservatory of Music, following this in 1965 by founding the dance department of the Jerusalem Academy of Music and Dance. She believed that incorporating dance in education would guide a person's spirit, establishing many youth dance troupes in Israel to spread the practice. She choreographed for the young dancers as well as teaching them skills and techniques, with her distinct choreography style based on Biblical narratives and everyday Israeli life. Levy-Agron was also a prominent figure in organizations and societies, with her personality and public appearances said to have helped promote dance in Israel.

Between 1962 and 1967, Levy-Agron directed the Jerusalem Contemporary Dance Company, composed of academy graduates, which performed around the world. In 1978, Levy-Agron was promoted to professor at the academy, and developed a high school matriculation pathway based around dance, which became officially accredited seven years later. She then founded the Springboard Company in 1993, a program to help Academy graduates prepare for professional performance careers.

In 1998 she was awarded the Israel Prize for excellence in stage arts.

== Personal life and death ==
She was married to Dani Agron, son of Gershon Agron, part of the Haganah, weapons smuggler for the Israel Defense Forces during the Israel-Palestine war, and co-founder of Israel Aerospace Industries with Shimon Peres. In 1957 they had a son, Amos Agron.

Levy-Agron died peacefully in the afternoon on 22 August 2001.
