= Shlomo Zalman Shragai =

Israeli politician (1898–1995)

- זלמן שרגאי
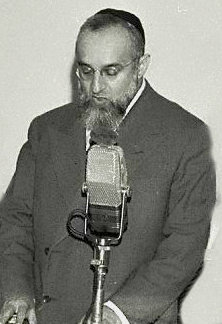

Mayor of Jerusalem
- In office 1951–1952
- Preceded by: Daniel Auster
- Succeeded by: Yitzhak Kariv

Personal details
- Born: 31 December 1898 Gorzkowice, Russian Empire
- Died: 2 September 1995 (aged 96) Jerusalem, Israel
- Party: Hapoel HaMizrachi

Shlomo Zalman Shragai (Hebrew: שלמה זלמן שרגאי; 31 December 1898–2 September 1995) was an Israeli politician and West Jerusalem's first elected mayor after it came under Israeli control following the 1948 Arab–Israeli War.

== Early life ==
Shlomo Zalman Shragai was born in Gorzkowice, on 31 December 1898, in a Orthodox Jewish family in Gorzkowice in 1899. He became active in the religious Zionist movement and moved from Poland to Palestine in 1924.

== Career ==
Shragai represented the Jewish Agency in London after the end of World War II.

In 1950, Shragai won the mayoralty as the council voted 11 to 9 in favour of him against Auster. Eliyahu Elyashar, Meir Rubin, and Menachem Porush were selected to be his vice mayors. One year into his term Shragai transferred his power to Elyashar, who became deputy mayor, and in August 1952, he resigned as mayor and from the council.

Shragai then became the head of immigration of the Jewish Agency for Palestine. This was a time of extensive immigration to Israel from Muslim countries, so he often went on clandestine trips to these countries to obtain the release of the Jews living there. He served as honorary world president of Hapoel HaMizrachi movement. Shragai was particularly active in encouraging religious Jews to move to Israel and was among the prime movers behind the establishment of Kiryat Sanz in Netanya, Kiryat Mattersdorf and Kiryat Itri in Jerusalem, and Kiryat Sassov near Ramat Gan.

== Personal life ==
Shragai had four children. He died in Jerusalem on 2 September 1995.

== Works cited ==
=== Journals ===
- Weitz, Yechiam (2022). "Municipal Elections in the Holy City: Campaigns, Results, and Coalition Building in Jerusalem, 1948–1973". Israel Studies. 27 (3). Indiana University Press: 143–165. doi:10.2307/48683547. JSTOR 48683547.

=== News ===
- "Shlomo Zalman Schragai, Former Jerusalem Mayor, 96". The New York Times. 4 September 1995. Archived from the original on 24 February 2025.
- Finklestone, Joseph (7 September 1995). "Obituary: Shlomo Shragai". The Independent. Archived from the original on 6 November 2026.
