= Yitzhak Kariv =

Israeli politician

- יצחק קריב
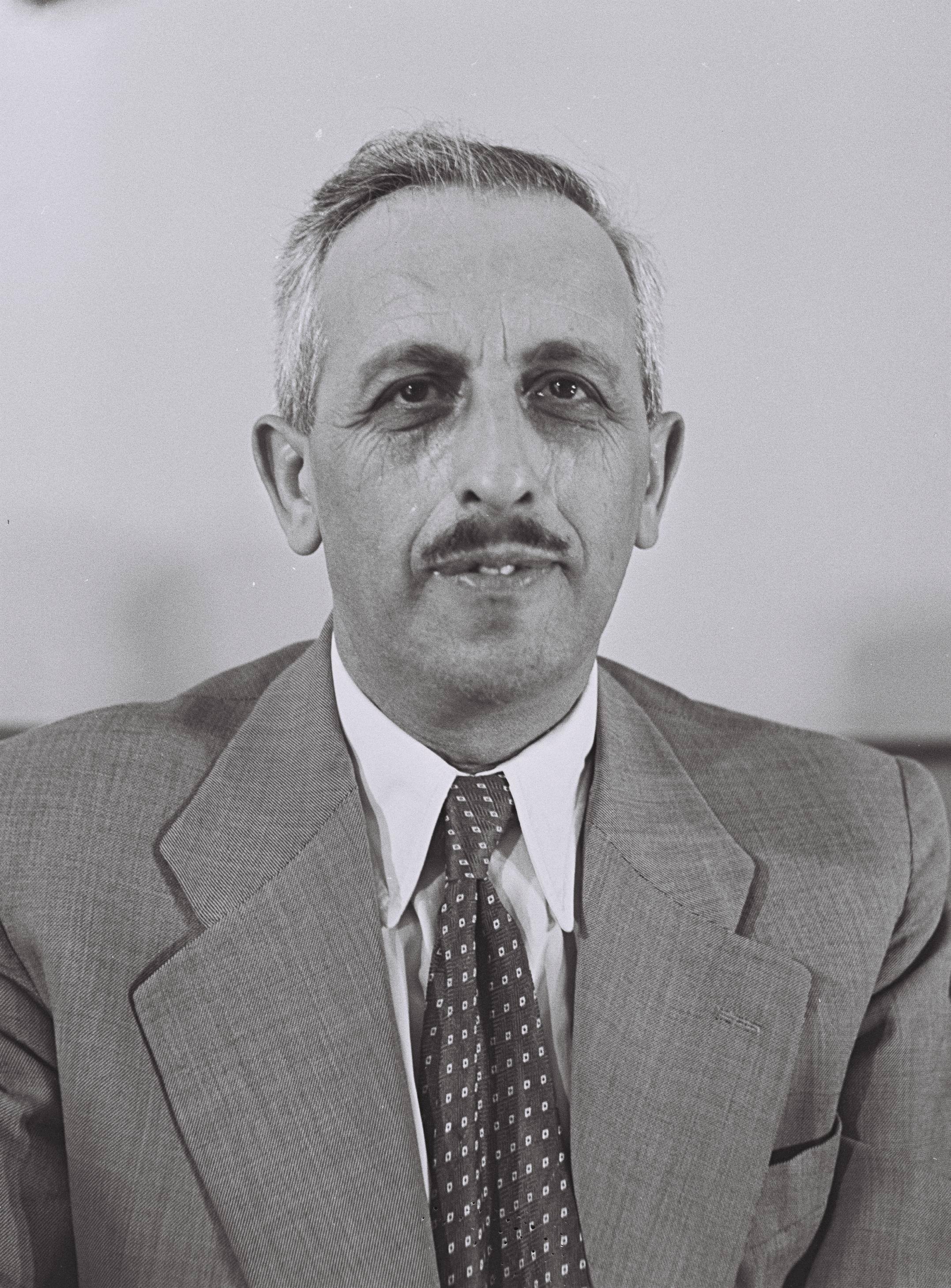

Mayor of Jerusalem
- In office 1952–1955
- Preceded by: Shlomo Zalman Shragai
- Succeeded by: Gershon Agron

Personal details
- Born: 1902 Russia
- Died: 1999 (aged 96–97) Israel
- Party: Mizrachi

Yitzhak Kariv (Hebrew: יצחק קריב; 1902–1999) was the mayor of West Jerusalem from 1952 to 1955, and a banker.

As a member of the Mizrachi political party, he was appointed as a compromise between the parties of the city hall, after Jerusalem's first elected mayor, Zalman Shragai, had resigned. In April 1955, a few months before the following elections, he was fired by the Minister of Interior, who replaced him with an appointed committee (ועדה קרואה).
