= The Jewish World =

Jewish weekly newspaper

Page one of the first edition, September 23, 1965

The Jewish World is a Jewish weekly newspaper founded by Sam S. Clevenson on September 23, 1965, covering the Capital District of New York. It was also published under the names Schenectady Jewish World and Albany Jewish world. In 2008, after Clevenson died, his two children Laurie and James continued to publish the newspaper.
