= MV Struma =

British ship built in 1867

Coordinates: 41°23′N 29°13′E

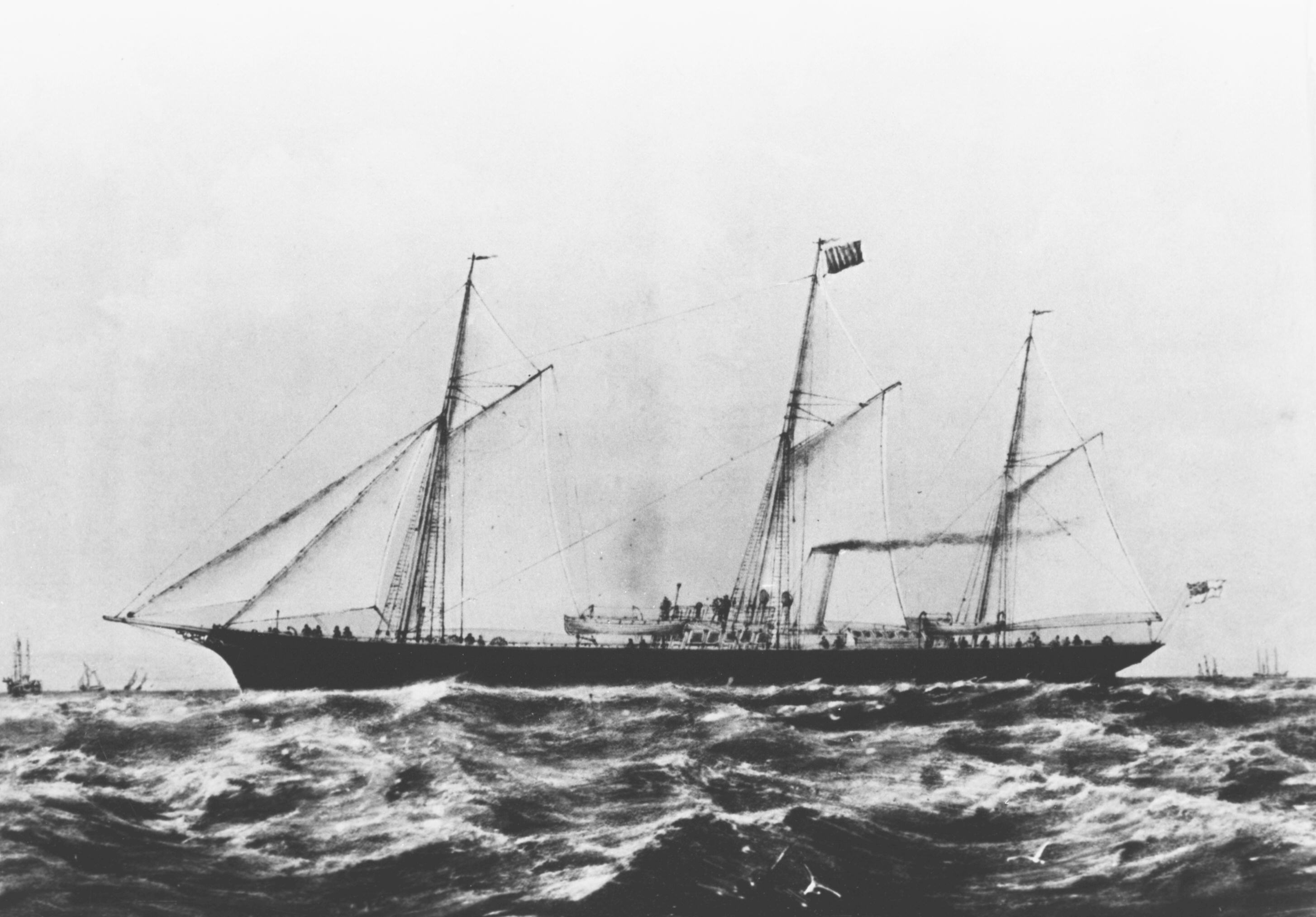
- British yacht Xantha in about 1890; In 1941 she was renamed Struma

History
- Name: Xantha (1867–88); Sölyst (1888–92); Sea Maid (1892–1901); Kafireus (1901–30); Esperos (1930–33); Makedoniya (1933–41); Struma (1941–42)
- Owner: The Marquess of Anglesey (1867– ); Thomas Chivers (1873– ); Viscount Macduff (1875– ); William Barneby (1877– ); Harry Edwards (1887– ); John Phipps (1895– ); DE Hadji Constanti & Bros (1901– ); Thrakiki Atmoploia (1916– ); Socratos Goumaris & Co ( –1930); Giorgios Mylonas (1930–33); Dimiter Nenkov (1933–41); Jean D Pandelis (1941–42)
- Port of registry: (United Kingdom) Newcastle (1867– ); (United Kingdom) Colchester (1871– ); (United Kingdom) Liverpool (1892– ); (Greece) Syros (1901– ); (Greece) Thessaloniki ( –1933); (Bulgaria) 1933–41; (Panama) 1941–42
- Builder: Palmers SB & Iron Co
- Yard number: 217
- Launched: 23 June 1867
- Completed: 1867
- Identification: UK official number 56071 (until 1901); (as Esperos) code letters HQBN
- Fate: Torpedoed and sunk by Shch-213, 24 February 1942

General characteristics
- Type: Steam yacht, then Cargo ship
- Tonnage: after 1901: 240 GRT; 158 NRT
- Length: 1867: 116.0 ft (35.4 m); 1875: lengthened to 134.0 ft (40.8 m); 1901: lengthened to 148.4 ft (45.2 m)
- Beam: 19.3 ft (5.9 m)
- Draught: 1867: 9.0 ft (2.7 m); 1901: 9.9 ft (3.0 m)
- Installed power: 1867: 40 NHP compound engine; 1888: 49 NHP quadruple-expansion engine; 1941: 3-cylinder diesel engine
- Propulsion: single screw
- Sail plan: three-masted schooner (as built)
- Crew: 10 (1941–42)

MV Struma was a small ship with a long history that included a number of changes of use and many changes of name. She was built in 1867 as Henry Paget, 2nd Marquess of Anglesey's luxury steam yacht and ended up 75 years later as a Greek and Bulgarian diesel ship for carrying livestock. She was launched as Xantha, but subsequently carried the names Sölyst, Sea Maid, Kafireus, Esperos, Makedoniya and finally Struma.

As Struma she tried to take nearly 800 Jewish refugees who were attempting to illegally immigrate from Romania to British-controlled Palestine in December 1941. Suffering engine problems, she was towed into Istanbul in December 1941. The Turkish government refused to allow her passengers to disembark unless Britain allowed them to immigrate to Palestine, which was not given due to the White Paper of 1939. Following weeks of diplomatic deadlock, in February 1942 Turkish authorities towed her out to sea and cast her adrift. A Soviet submarine quickly torpedoed and sank Struma in the Black Sea, killing all but one of her 792 passengers and crew.

== Building ==
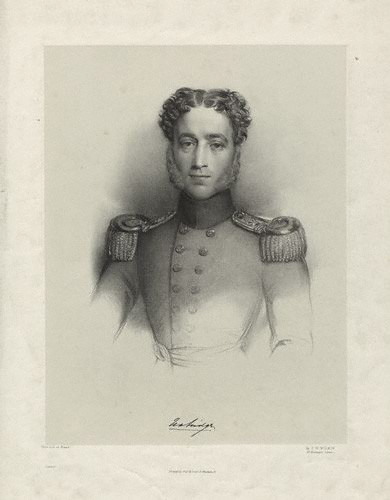
Engraving by Francis William Wilkin of Henry Paget, 2nd Marquess of Anglesey, for whom Xantha was built

Palmers Shipbuilding and Iron Company of Jarrow in North East England built her in 1867 as the iron-hulled yacht Xantha for Henry Paget, 2nd Marquess of Anglesey, who was a courtier to Queen Victoria and Lord Lieutenant of Anglesey in North Wales.

She was built with a 40 NHP Palmer's compound steam engine and three schooner-rigged masts.

== Changes of owner, length and use ==
In 1871 Xantha was registered at Colchester. In 1873 she was acquired by a Thomas Chivers. In 1875 she was acquired by Viscount Macduff and lengthened to 134.0 ft (40.8 m). In 1877 she was acquired by a William Barneby. In 1887 she was acquired by a Harry Edwards.

In 1888 she was renamed Sölyst and registered at South Shields. In the same year her original compound steam engine was replaced with a 49 NHP Ernest Scott & Co quadruple-expansion steam engine. In 1892 she was acquired by a Charmes McIver, who renamed her Sea Maid and registered her at Liverpool. In 1895 she was acquired by a John Phipps.

In 1901 she was acquired by DE Hadji Constanti and Brothers of Syros, who renamed her Kaphireus. They had her lengthened to 148.4 ft (45.2 m) and converted into a cargo ship. One source suggests that in 1913 during the Balkan Wars the Kingdom of Greece requisitioned her as a troopship to take soldiers from Chalkidiki to Amphipolis. In 1916 Thrakiki Atmoploia ("Thracian Steamships") acquired her and used her as a coastal trading vessel. At an unknown date she passed to Socratis Goumaris and Company of Thessaloniki, who renamed her Esperos. In 1930 she was acquired by Giorgios Mylonas, who registered her in Thessaloniki.

In 1933 Mylonas sold her to a Bulgarian owner, Dimiter Kenkov, who renamed her Makedoniya, based her in the port of Varna and used her to carry cattle on the River Danube. Lloyd's Register of Shipping does not list her as Makedoniya, and she last appears as Esperos in the 1934 edition. If she was no longer ocean-going she may have been de-registered. One source claims Makedoniya was not in service after 1937.

In 1941 Kenkov sold her to Compañía Mediterránea de Vapores Limitada, which was controlled by a Greek shipping agent, Jean D Pandelis. He renamed her Struma and registered her under the Panamanian flag of convenience.

At some date one of the ship's three masts had been removed. Lloyd's Register of Shipping lists her as still having her steam engine in 1934, but within a few years it had been replaced with a three-cylinder marine diesel engine built by Benz & Cie. of Mannheim in Germany. Some sources claim that the diesel engine had been salvaged from a wreck sunk in the Danube.

== Sinking ==
Photo believed to show Struma in port in Istanbul, 1942

In 1941 the New Zionist Organisation and the Betar Zionist youth movement chartered Struma from Jean Pandelis to take Jewish refugees from Romania to Palestine. On 12 December 1941 she left the port of Constanța in Romania carrying 10 crew and about 781 refugees. Her diesel engine was not working so a tug towed Struma out to sea. She drifted overnight while her crew tried in vain to start her engine. She transmitted distress signals and on 13 December the tug returned and the tug's crew repaired Struma's engine in exchange for the passengers' wedding rings. Struma then got under way but by 15 December her engine had failed again and she was towed into Istanbul in Turkey.

While Turkish mechanics made unsuccessful attempts to repair Struma's engine, Turkish officials informed their British counterparts that they would not allow Struma's passengers to land unless Britain permitted them to emigrate to Palestine. As the passengers were attempting to illegally immigrate to Palestine in violation of the restrictions laid out in the White Paper of 1939, British diplomats informed the Turkish government no such permission would be given. Following weeks of negotiation, the British agreed to honour the expired Palestinian immigration visas that a few passengers possessed, allowing them to travel to Palestine overland. With the help of several sympathetic residents of Istanbul, a few passengers managed to escape into Turkey. One woman, Madeea Solomonovici, was admitted to an Istanbul hospital after she had miscarried.

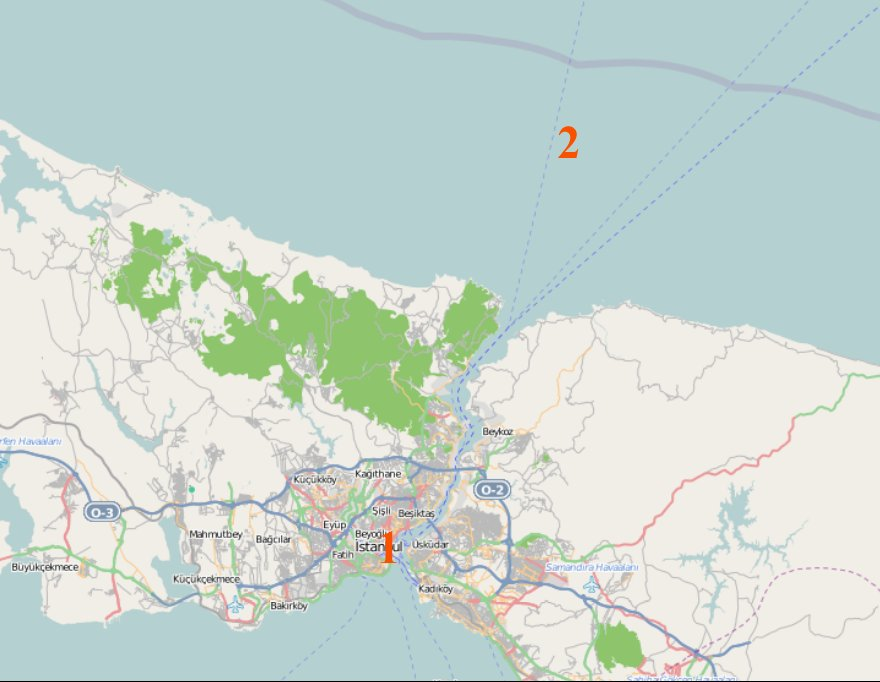
Map of the Bosphorus strait showing where Struma anchored in quarantine in Istanbul harbour (1), and where she was torpedoed and sank in the Black Sea (2)

On 23 February 1942 Turkish police boarded Struma. Her engine still did not work so they towed her back out into the Black Sea and cast her adrift about 10 miles off Istanbul. On the morning of 24 February the Soviet submarine Shch-213 torpedoed her. Struma sank quickly and many people were trapped below decks and drowned.

Many others aboard survived the sinking and clung to pieces of wreckage, but for hours no rescue came and all but one of them died from drowning or hypothermia. Struma's First Officer clung to a piece of wreckage that was floating in the sea along with a 19-year-old refugee, David Stoliar. The officer died overnight but Turks in a rowing boat rescued Stoliar the next day: the only survivor of 791 people (781 Jewish refugees and 10 crew members, some Jewish) who were aboard.

Memorials at Ashdod and Holon in Israel commemorate those who were killed by her sinking. Struma's wreck has not yet been found, although an attempt to do so was made in 2000.

== Sources ==
- Frantz, Douglas; Collins, Catherine (2003). Death on the Black Sea: The Untold Story of the Struma and World War II's Holocaust at Sea. London: HarperCollins. ISBN 0-06-621262-6.
- McFadden, Robert D (23 January 2016). "David Stoliar, Survivor of World War II Disaster, Dies at 91". The New York Times.
- Ofer, Dalia (1990). Escaping the Holocaust – Illegal Immigration to the Land of Israel, 1939–1944. New York: Oxford University Press. pp. 149–171. ISBN 0-19-506340-6.
- Rohwer, Jürgen (1964). Die Versenkung der Judischen Flüchtlingstransporter Struma und Mefkura im Schwartzen Meer Feb. 1942–Aug. 1944. Frankfurt am Main: Bernard Graefe Verlag für Wehrwesen.
- Enghelberg, Hedi (2013). The Last Witness, The Sinking of SS/MV Struma Feb. 24, 1942. Fort Lauderdale: Eng Publishing.
