= Mamilla =

Neighbourhood of Jerusalem, Israel

Coordinates: 31°46′34″N 35°13′24″E

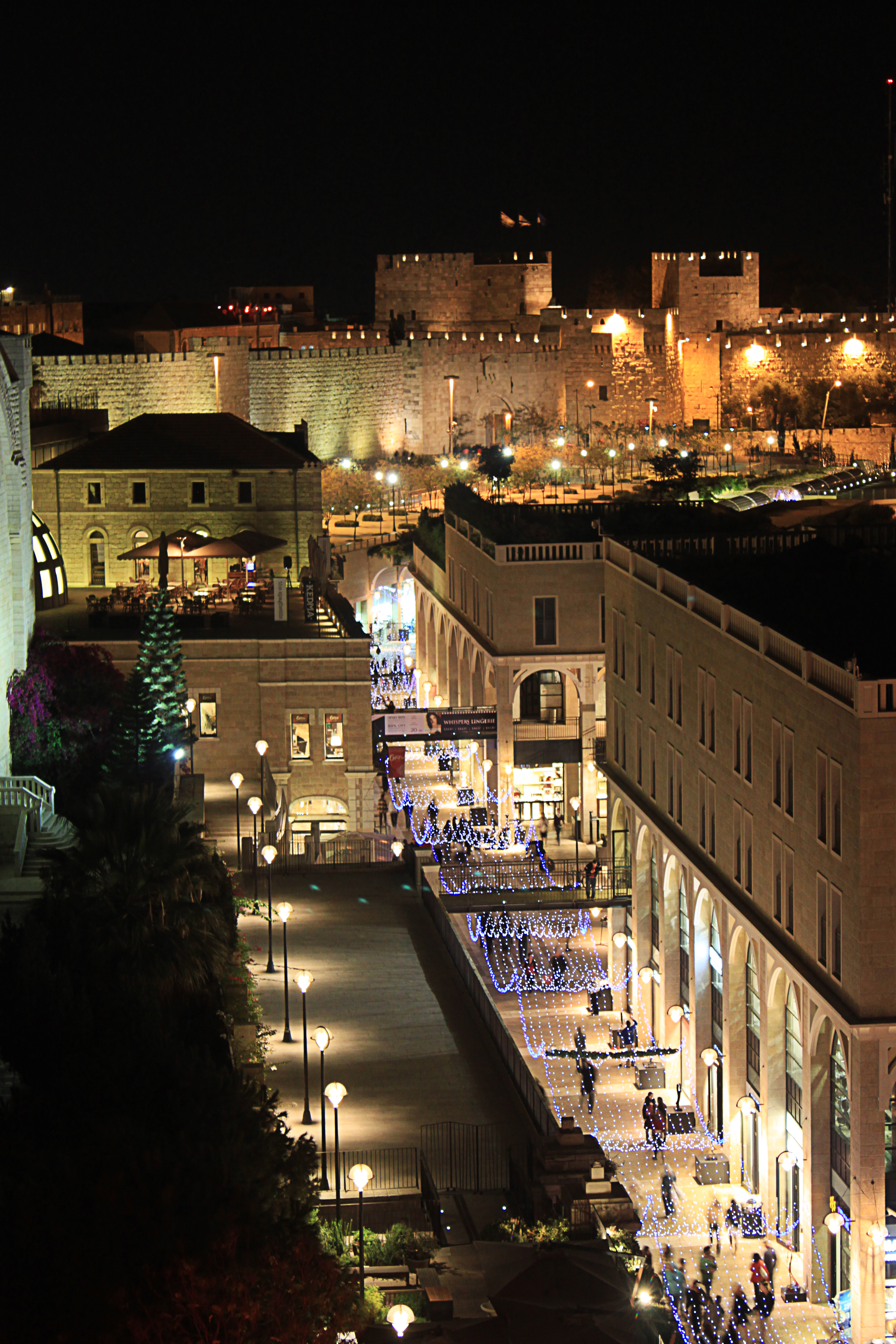
Mamilla Avenue, 2011

Mamilla (Hebrew: ממילא) is a neighbourhood of Jerusalem that was established in the late 19th century outside the Old City, west of the Jaffa Gate. Until 1948 it was a mixed Jewish–Arab business district. Between 1948 and 1967, it was located along the armistice line between the Israeli and Jordanian-held sector of the city, and many buildings were destroyed by Jordanian shelling. The Israeli government approved an urban renewal project for Mamilla, apportioning land for residential and commercial zones, including hotels and office space. The Mamilla Mall opened in 2007.

== Geography ==
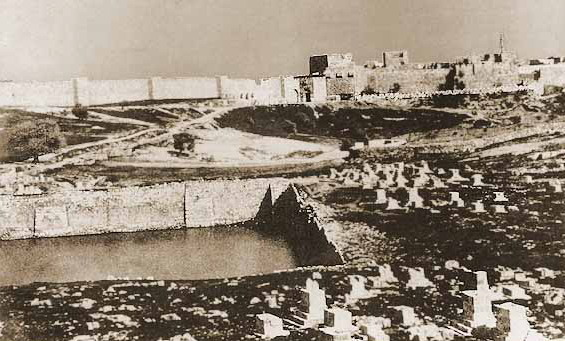
Mamilla Pool, mid-19th century

The neighbourhood of Mamilla is located within the northwest extension of the Hinnom Valley, which extends from the southwest corner of the Old City along the city's western wall. The neighbourhood is bounded by the Jaffa Gate and Jaffa Road to the east and north, the downtown and Rehavia neighbourhood above it to the west, and Yemin Moshe's upward slope along its southwestern edge. Its total area is 120 dunam (0.12 square kilometres (0.05 sq mi)).

== History ==
=== Iron Age ===
During construction in Mamilla between 1989 and 1991, archaeologists uncovered a dozen tombs dating to the Iron Age, including rock-cut tombs from the late 8th or early 7th century BCE, corresponding to Iron Age II and the time of the Kingdom of Judah. These caves featured characteristic elements of the period, such as burial benches and a standing pit. One cave was abandoned following the Babylonian conquest of Jerusalem, which led to the displacement of its original users. When the exiles returned to the city, the cave was reused and remained in use until the Hasmonean era, by which time it was full and no longer served for burials.

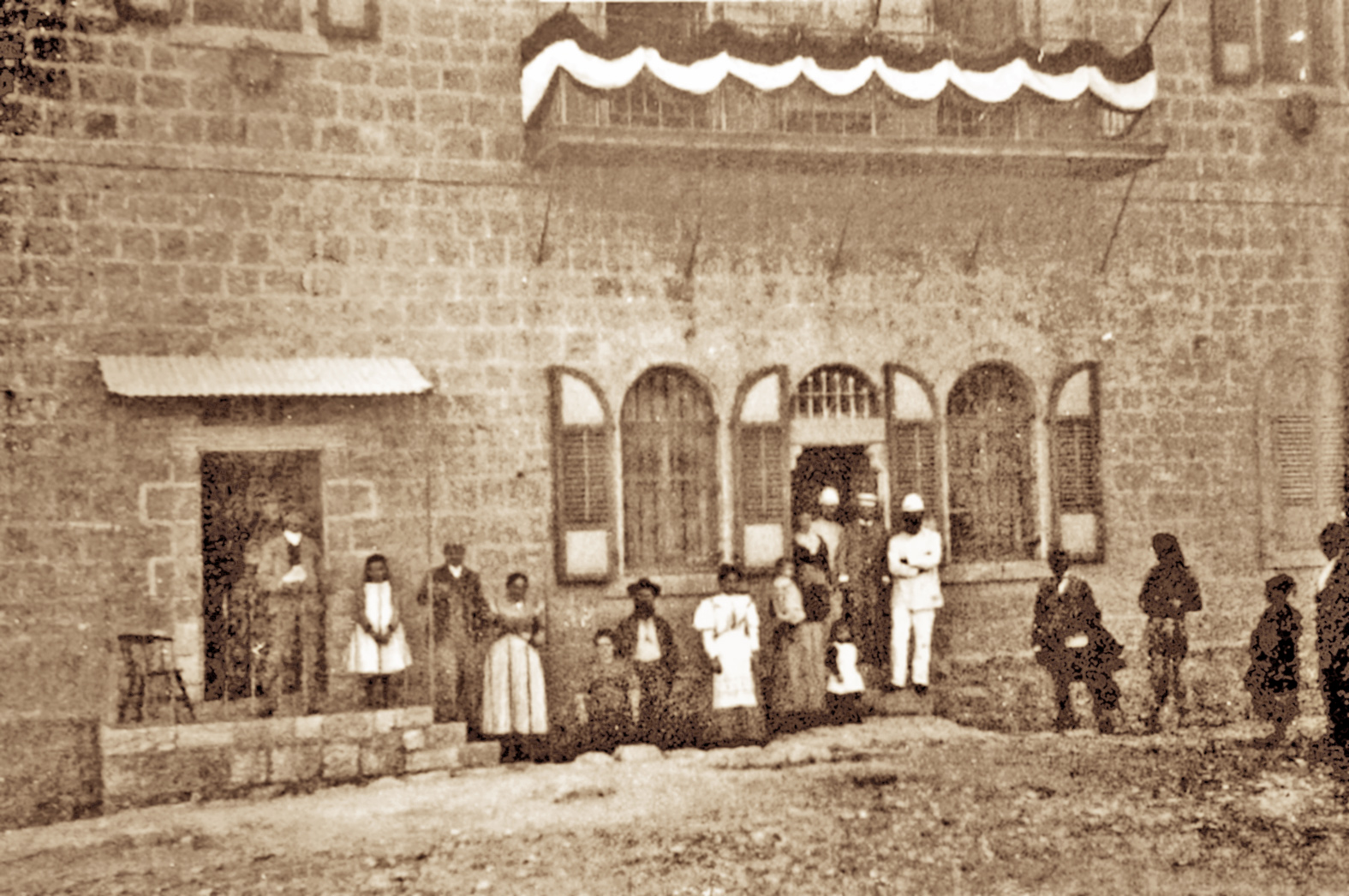
Theodor Herzl outside the Stern House, 1898

=== Roman period ===
The now dry "Mamilla Pool", with a capacity of 30,000 cubic metres, was probably built by Herod the Great. An underground channel connected it to Hezekiah's Pool, situated inside the city walls and in immediate proximity to Herod's royal palace. Herod is known to have built the Pool of the Towers (probably identical to Hezekiah's Pool) and the Serpent's Pool (Birket es-Sultan, Sultan's Pool), which were both fed by aqueducts coming from the Mamilla Pool.

=== Byzantine period ===
The massacre of Christians during the Persian invasion of 614 at the Mamilla Pool, attributed by the Christian chronicler Strategius to Jewish revenge after years of Byzantine repression, was documented by an archaeological find in a chapel containing hundreds of human skeletons of urban dwellers of both sexes and of relatively young age. The site of the chapel is now covered over by the Mamilla Mall parking house.

=== Crusader period ===
Stone-carved sarcophagi from the Crusader period are visible west of Mamilla Pool among the tombs of the historical Mamilla cemetery, probably the remains of a cemetery of the Augustinian canons of the Church of the Holy Sepulchre.

=== Mamluk period ===
The elaborate mausoleum of Emir ‘Ala al-Din Aydughdi ibn ‘Abdallah el-Kubaki, who died in Jerusalem in 1289, is known as Turbat el-Kubakiya.

=== Ottoman period ===
In the late 19th century, the area around the Old City walls was barren and undeveloped. It was only notable for the junction of paths that would become Jaffa Road and the highway to Jaffa, with the road to Hebron outside the Jaffa Gate. Among its first structures was the Hospice Saint Vincent de Paul, part of the emerging French Compound. The early building developed as an extension of the adjacent souk along the city walls at the Jaffa Gate as a quarter for merchants and artisans. It became home for commerce and residences that could not find room within the overcrowded Old City, and several of Jerusalem's prominent modern businesses, like Hotel Fast, were first built here. In 1908, the Ottoman authorities erected a clock tower above Jaffa Gate. The British removed it a decade later.

=== British Mandate ===
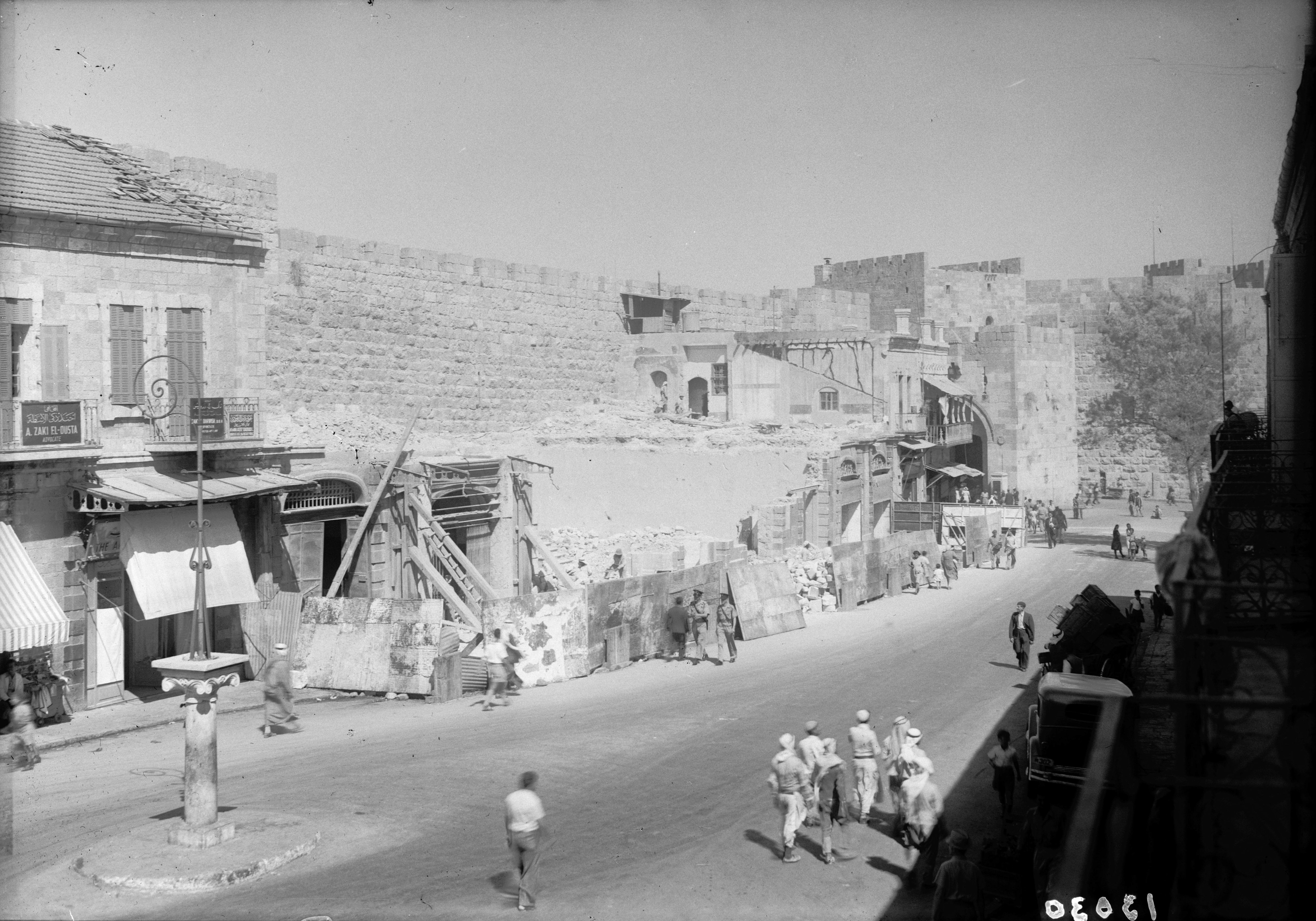
British demolition of buildings along the Old City walls, 1944

The British attempted to preserve historical structures in Jerusalem, among which the city walls were identified as such an element, so British workers acted to clear away the stalls on their perimeter and maintain an open area between the walls and the rest of the New City in the interest of an aesthetically pleasing visual basin. By the same token, planners demolished the Ottoman clock tower to preserve a historic skyline.

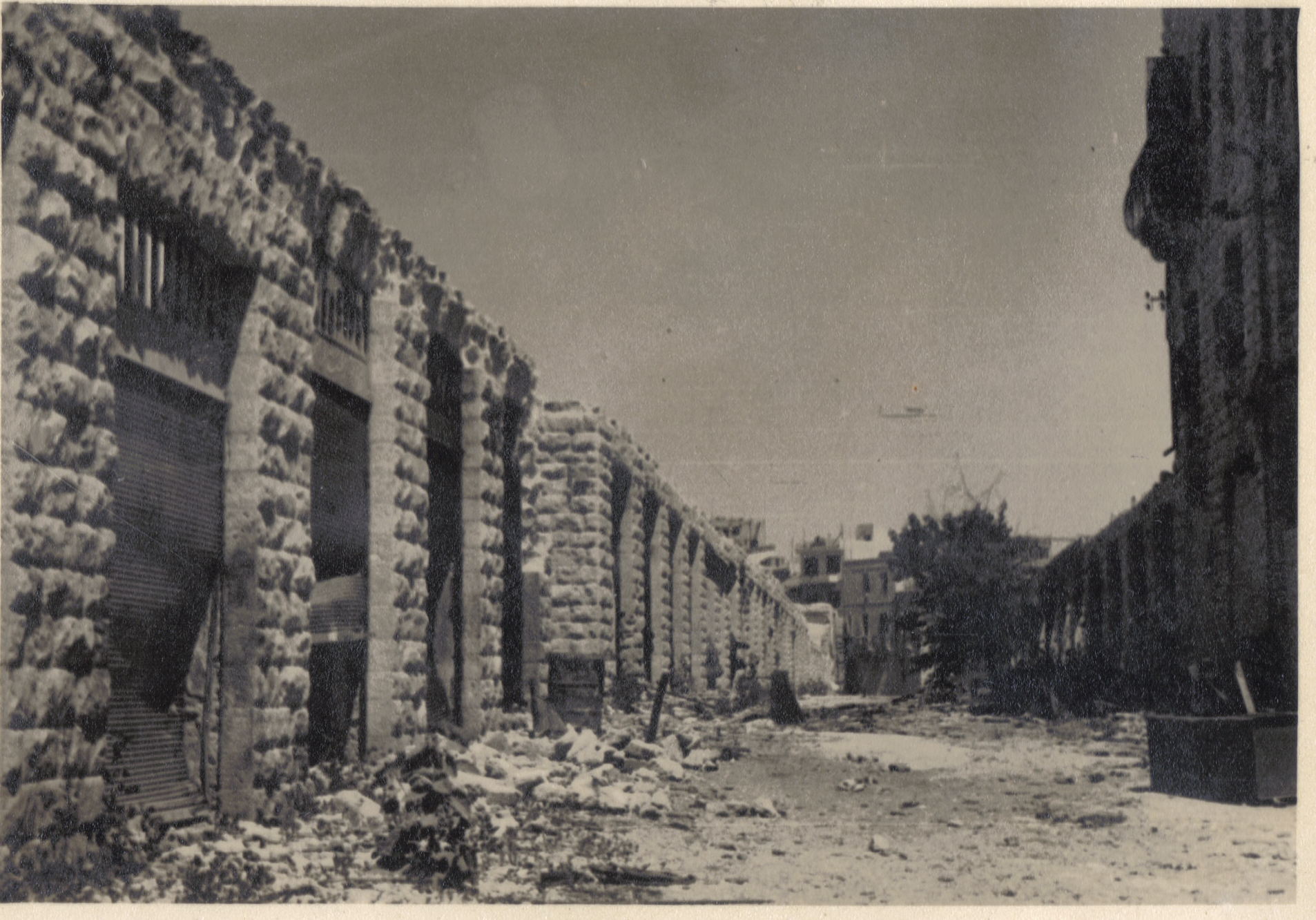
Mamilla in ruins, c. 1949

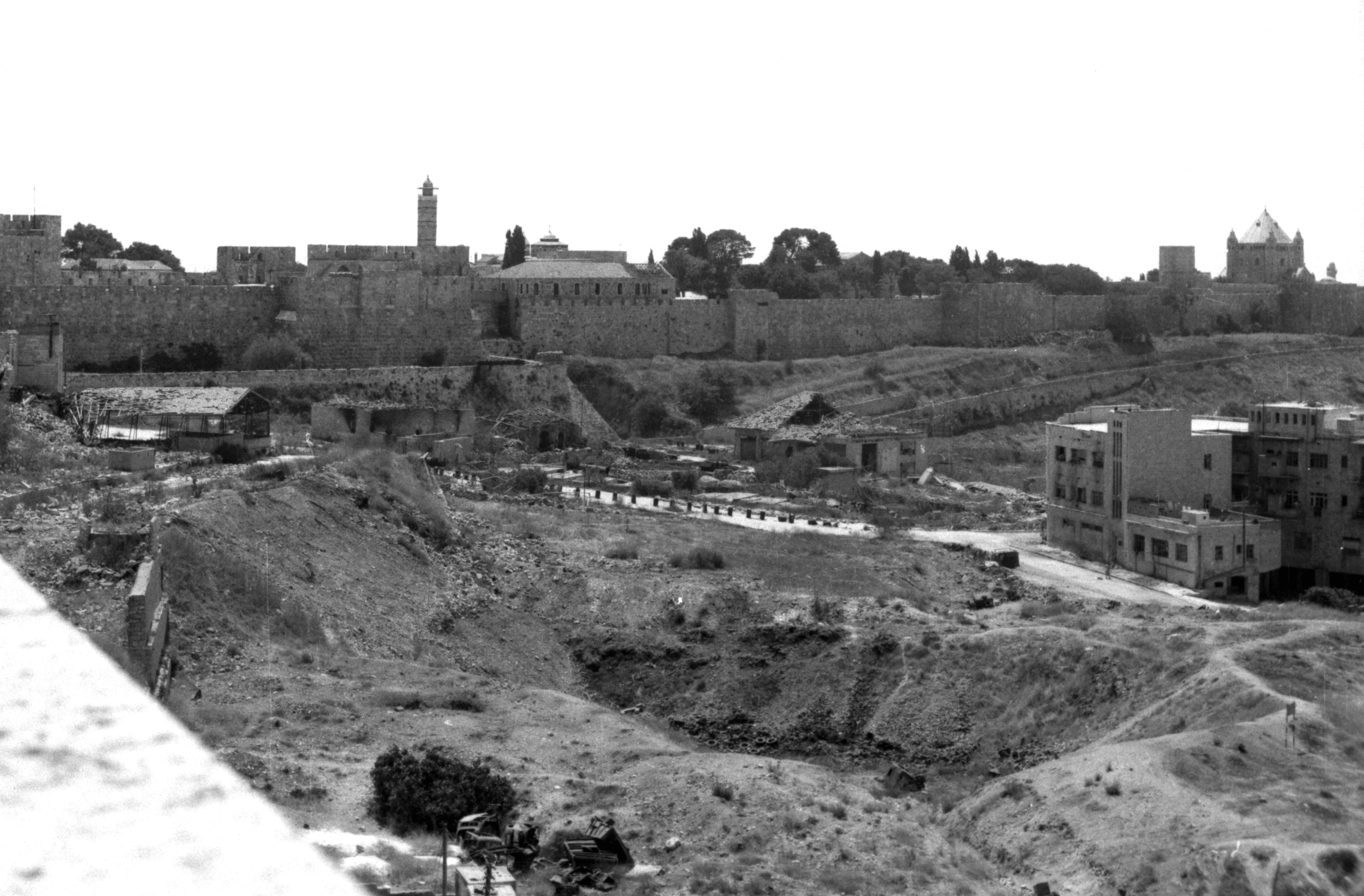
No man's land in Jerusalem, between Israel and Jordan. The photo (taken approx. 1964) depicts the Old City wall, Dormition Abbey (on the far right), and Tower of David (center-left). It was taken from the building of the Geology dep. of the Hebrew University of Jerusalem, then located on Mamilla street.

Following the approval of the 1947 UN Partition Plan, an Arab protest aiming to march from the Jaffa Gate to Princess Mary Street was stopped by British police on December 2, 1947. This led the protestors to riot, ransack and burn many Jewish stores, invoking a reprisal from Jewish militias, who fired at the rioters. An Arab-owned cinema was burned to the ground. Several Jewish residents were stabbed over the course of the 1947 Jerusalem riots, one of the events leading to the area's decades-long stagnation and use as a no man's land during the war of 1948

=== Jordanian period ===
As the 1948 Arab–Israeli War commenced, the neighbourhood's location between Israeli and Jordanian forces made it a combat zone, leading to the flight of both Jewish and Arab residents. On May 22, 1948 the US Consul, Thomas C. Wasson, was assassinated shortly after leaving the French Consulate in the Mamilla district. After the signing of the 1949 Armistice Agreements and division of Jerusalem, the western three-quarters of Mamilla were held by Israel and the eastern quarter became a no man's land of barbed-wire and concrete barricades between Israeli and Jordanian lines. The active and hostile border subjected Mamilla to Jordanian sniper and guerilla attacks, and even stones thrown by Arab Legionnaires from the Old City walls above. The neighbourhood was one of several border areas in the city to experience a sharp decline, and subsequently became home to families of new immigrants with many children and of weak financial abilities, as well as dirty light industry like auto repair. In Mamilla in this period, the residents were primarily Kurdish immigrants and their Israeli children.

=== Reunification and urban renewal plans ===
After the Six-Day War in 1967, Jerusalem's municipal borders were expanded to include the Old City and beyond. Barricades that had lined the border were torn down. Many buildings on Mamilla's eastern end were in shambles from the fighting and lack of maintenance. Several historic buildings were condemned. One was the Stern House, which housed Zionist leader Theodor Herzl on his 1898 visit. However, popular outcry brought Supreme Court involvement which led to the temporary dismantling and reassembly nearby of this historical landmark.

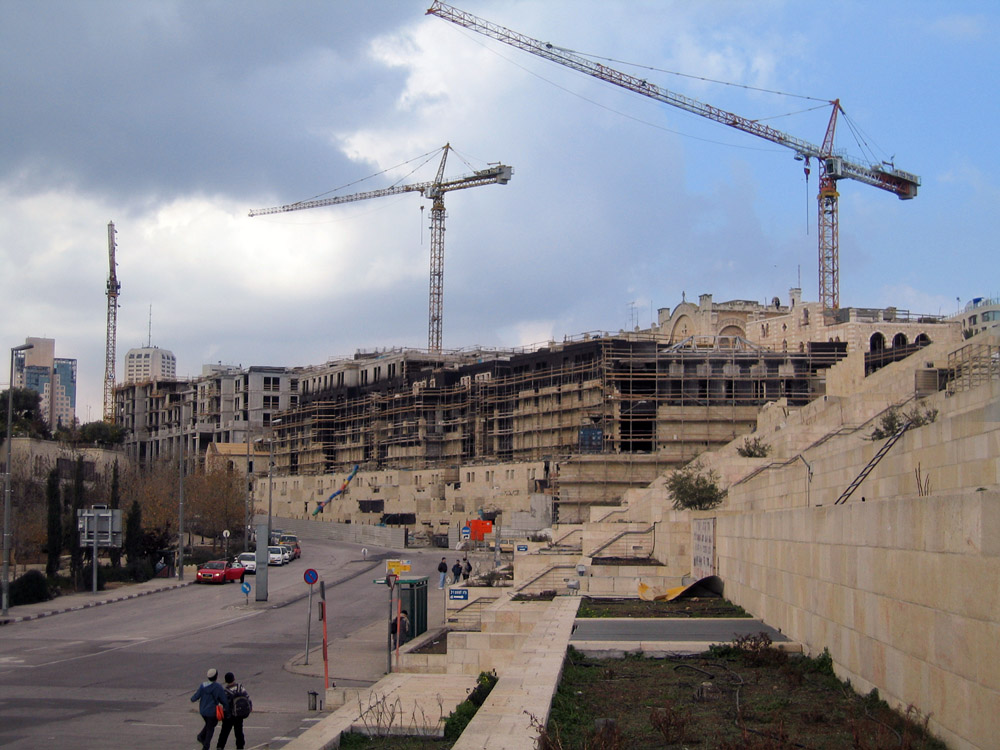
The terrace and Jerusalem stone-covered parking garage with construction in the background, January 2007

The 1970s saw numerous proposals for rehabilitating the neighbourhood, and it was defined as a zone of high-priority for reconstruction efforts. The administration responsible for preservation and construction in the Old City took Mamilla under its jurisdiction as well, both because of its proximity and its possession of many of the same considerations that the British weighed when regulating its development. A 1972 master-plan for revitalising the city centre transferred 100 of the 120 dunams (0.1 square kilometres (0.04 sq mi)) to Karta, the municipal firm led by architects Gilbert Weil and Moshe Safdie charged with the project, and called for the destruction of almost every building save the French Hospice St. Vincent de Paul. The plan called for a subterranean street system, over-ground buildings for offices and stores, a pedestrian promenade, parking for 1,000 cars, and a bus terminal.

This plan evoked massive criticism throughout the city government, although mayor Teddy Kollek lent full political backing to the plan. When deputy mayor Meron Benvenisti commissioned a more conservative plan under architect David Kroyanker based on facadism, the mayor immediately filed it away without any discussion. Karta evicted 700 families, communal institutions, and businesses, placing them in the then-developing neighbourhoods of Baka and Neve Yaakov, and moved the industry to Talpiot, the seed of its current industrial zone. The evictions cost the Israeli government over $60 million and were only completed in 1988, when Mamilla ceased to exist as a neighbourhood and instead became a "compound" slated for future construction.

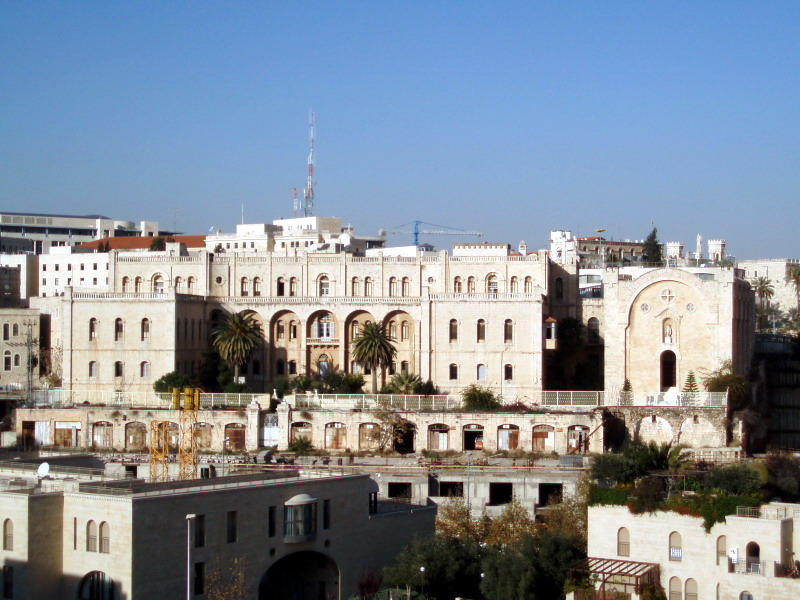
Hospice Saint Vincent de Paul, Mamilla

The evicted residents were mostly Jewish immigrants from Arab states whose weak financial status left them vulnerable to Kollek's plan. The following steep increase in real-estate values of formerly depressed areas like Mamilla near the former armistice line and the Old City was perceived by evicted Mizrahi Jews as an injustice. This became a key issue in 1970s Israeli social upheaval and the founding of the Black Panthers movement in Israel.

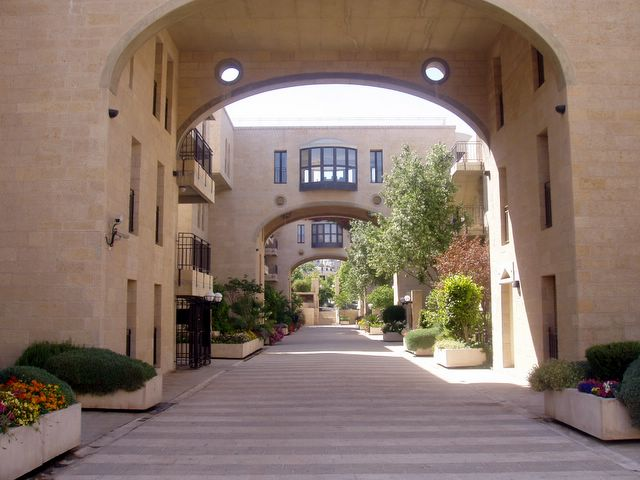
Upscale apartments in David's Village echoing the arches and alleyways of the Old City

After 16 years of controversy, during which the half-constructed Mamilla project remained an eyesore in the heart of the city, a revised plan drawn up by architect Moshe Safdie incorporating elements of Kroyanker's conservative design moved forward in 1986. The new plan called for the compound to be divided into four areas: an open-air mall with mixed-use 3-6 storey buildings and a multi-storey car park, terraced residential housing, and two hotels along its border with the downtown. The British Ladbroke Group plc, which controls the Hilton Hotels Corporation, won the bid to build the project's main hotel (originally Hilton Jerusalem and now David Citadel Hotel) and its housing, which it built as a luxury gated community named David's Village (Hebrew: כּֽפָר דָּוִד, Kfar David).

Numerous disputes between Karta and Ladbroke led the British firm to exit the project, and its shares were assumed by Alfred Akirov's Alrov company. However, further objections from many sources—including religious groups opposed to an entertainment area so close to the Old City and possible operation on the Jewish Sabbath—kept construction at a crawl. Both Alrov and Karta accused each other of breach of contract and sued. After years of frozen construction and drawn-out mediation, the Jerusalem district court found parts of both parties' complaints to be justified and ordered 100 million NIS paid to Alrov by Karta, which allowed construction to resume.

May 28, 2007 saw the opening of phase one of the shopping mall and part of the 600-meter promenade. The completion of the remainder of the promenade, the Stern House rebuilding, and the other construction, including the 207-room five-star second hotel, was scheduled to be completed in the spring of 2008.

Like several other luxury neighbourhoods in the city, apartments in the David's Village development are mostly owned by foreigners who visit for only a few days or weeks a year. Critics contend that this makes it a ghost town in the city centre.

Mamilla is also the location of the projected Simon Wiesenthal Center's Museum of Tolerance Jerusalem, a controversial project because its construction would require building on part of an old Muslim cemetery.

== Mamilla Mall ==
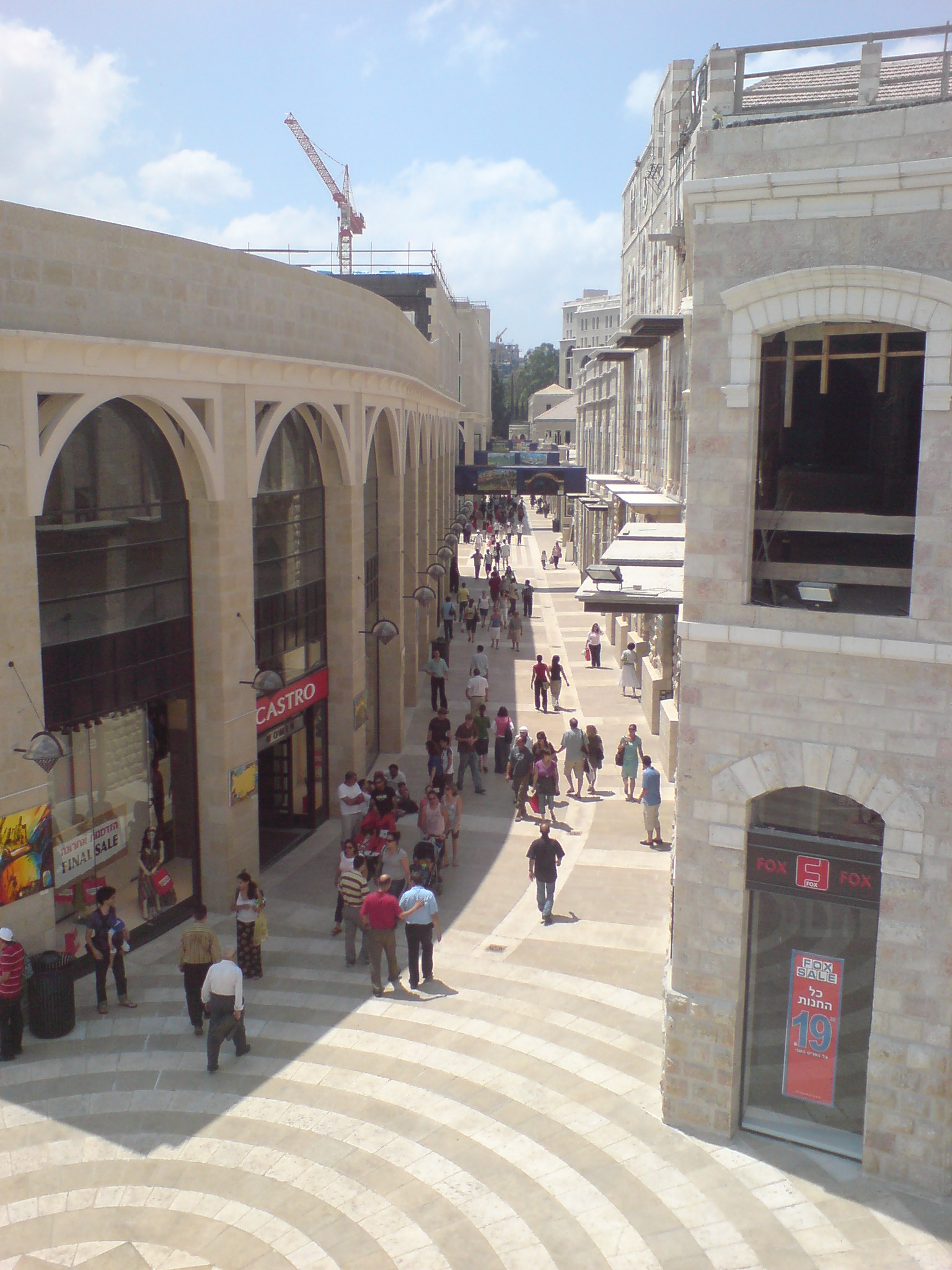
Mamilla's shopping street

The $150 million, pedestrian-only Mamilla shopping mall has been touted as a luxury destination in the style of Los Angeles' Rodeo Drive or The Grove. Its commercial space is leased at $40 to $80 per square metre to 140 businesses, including international names like Rolex, MAC, H. Stern, Nike, Polo Ralph Lauren, Nautica, bebe, and Tommy Hilfiger, as well as local chains like Castro, Ronen Chen, Steimatzky Books, and Cafe Rimon. The mall is also slated to house an IMAX theatre. The first Gap store in Israel opened in Mamilla Mall in August 2009.

== Teddy Fountain ==
The Teddy Fountain opened on the valley slope in 2013.

== Notable residents ==
- Uri Malmilian (born 1957), football (soccer) player and manager
