= Am Oved =

Israeli publishing house

Am Oved Book Publishing Ltd
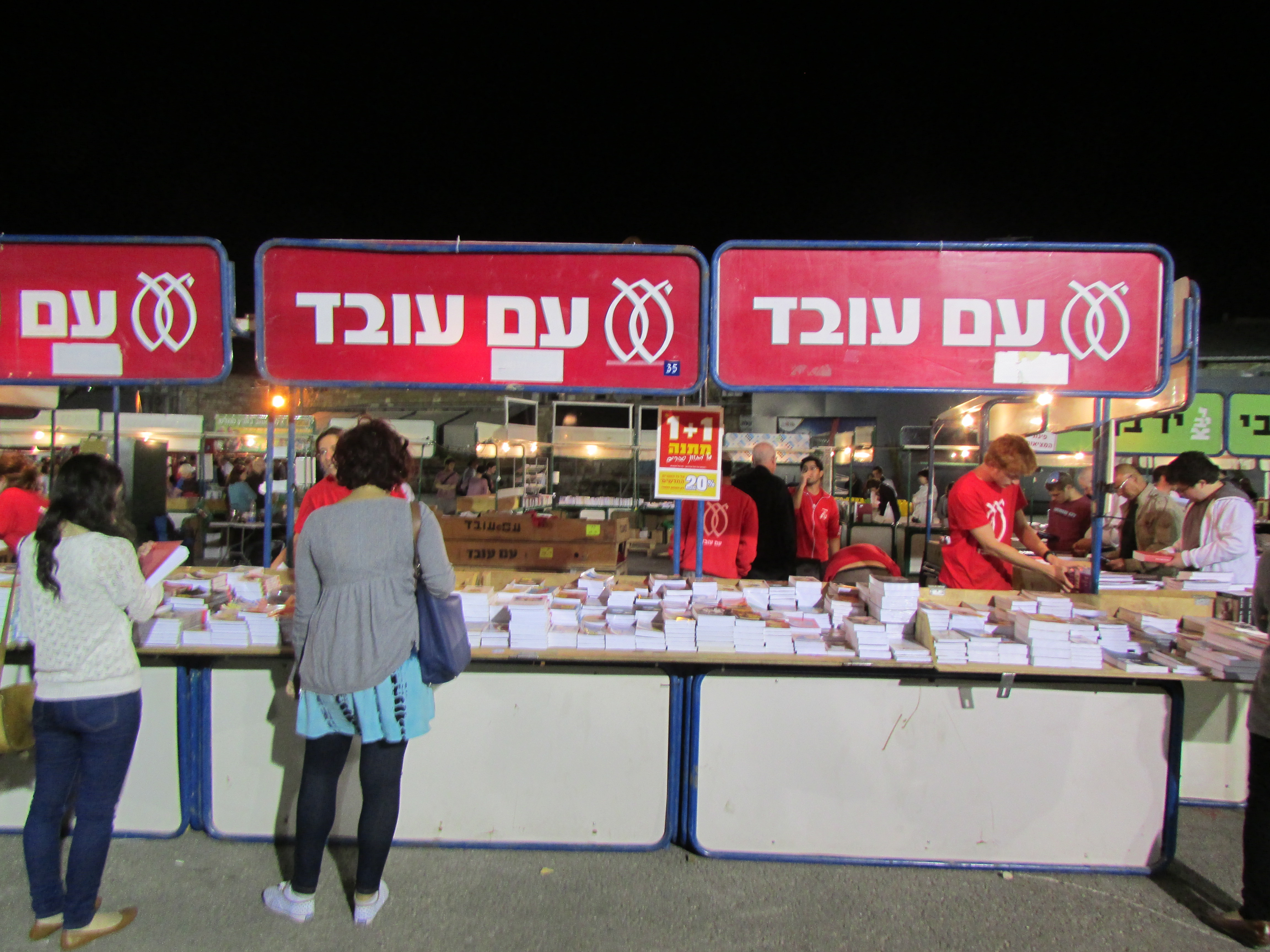
- Am Oved stand at Hebrew Book Week
- Founded: April 1, 1942; 84 years ago
- Founder: Berl Katznelson
- Country of origin: Israel
- Headquarters location: Tel Aviv
- Key people: Chanital Suissa (CEO)
- Owner: Histadrut
- Official website: www.am-oved.co.il

Am Oved Book Publishing Ltd (Hebrew: הוצאת ספרים עם עובד בע"מ) also known as Am Oved (Hebrew: עם עובד, lit. 'Working People') is an Israeli publishing house established in Mandatory Palestine in April 1942 by Berl Katznelson, under the auspices of the Histadrut. Am Oved was founded to make high-quality books accessible and affordable to the Hebrew-speaking working class, in line with the ideals of Labor Zionism. Over the decades, it has become a central cultural institution, publishing fiction, non-fiction, poetry, children's literature, and academic journals.

== History ==
=== 1930s–1943: Establishment and early years ===
The idea of establishing a book publishing house under the auspices of the Histadrut dates back to 1935, but was initially postponed due to budgetary constraints and internal opposition, which feared that would "represent the largest party in the Histadrut – Mapai – and not the entire Histadrut public," as figures like Meir Yaari and Yaakov Hazan of the National Kibbutz Movement argued that if Mapai wanted a publishing house, it should establish one independently.

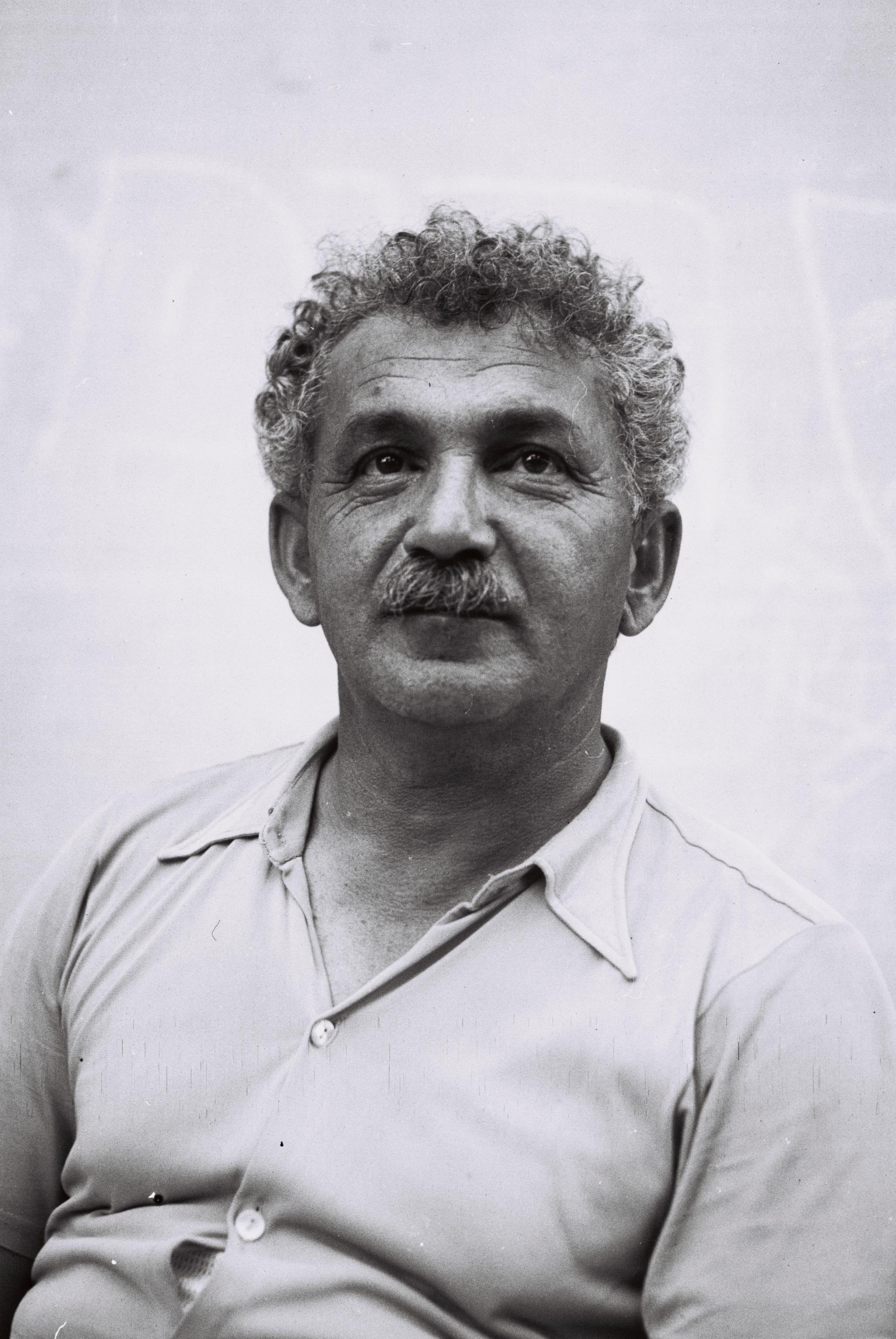
The founder, Berl Katznelson, in 1934

However, Berl Katznelson, one of the leaders of the Zionist labor movement and editor of the Histadrut newspaper Davar, insisted, and in 1940 the plan was approved. Katznelson's vision was rooted in the belief that, although the Hebrew worker was deeply engaged in the struggles of daily life, they also "aspired to broaden their intellectual and cultural horizons." To support this belief, he argued that the Histadrut must help workers build personal libraries by offering high-quality books at affordable prices through a carefully curated selection of titles.

During World War II, with support from Mapai and Histadrut leaders, Katznelson established Am Oved as large, independent publishing house, owned by the Histadrut. As such, it was sometimes referred to as "the Histadrut's book publishing house." Mapai and the Histadrut guaranteed Katznelson full editorial freedom and managerial independence. Despite opposition from left-wing parties, the Histadrut Council appointed Katznelson as its sole editor in January 1941. Katznelson saw the publishing house as an important tool for shaping the image and culture of a "Hebrew society." He stated: "Just as Histadrut is responsible for the establishment of the country [Israel], Am Oved is responsible for the culture of the people." For Katznelson, Am Oved also aimed to revive Hebrew and Jewish culture. Another goal was supporting Jewish writers from the working class, partly due to his earlier observations of Y.H. Brenner's struggles.

For a brief moment, I was able to bring the Histadrut - knowingly or unknowingly - not only into a publishing enterprise, but into responsibility for the fate of Hebrew literature and the state of the Hebrew writer's

— Berl Katznelson, in a letter to David Zakai

On April 1, 1942, the first Am Oved information bulletin was published in Davar, with a half-page advertisement on the front page titled "To the Hebrew Reader." The ad declared that the publishing house was established "to meet the educational and cultural needs of all workers, and to serve as a driving force for our spiritual creativity, our education, and the enrichment of our lives." Though Am Oved was envisioned as a Hebrew workers’ publishing house with a Hebrew national cultural role, it did not enter an empty field: by the 1930s, several publishing houses were already active in Palestine, some privately owned, such as Schocken, and others affiliated with ideological labor movements, like the Workers’ Library of the National Kibbutz and the United Kibbutz Publishing House.

At that time, Am Oved offered three book series or "libraries": "For Children," "Youth," and "For the Generation" (for adults). The children's and youth series edited by Bracha Habas, focused on "educational" books designed focused on "educational" books designed intended to instill Zionist and socialist values in young readers. The primary criterion for these series was educational value rather than literary merit. Historian Anita Shapira notes that only Katznelson's "good taste" as an editor prevented these books from becoming outright propaganda. Am Oved also published a separate series titled From the Frontlines, which focused on World War II events, covering topics such as London during the Blitz and Letters from the Ghettos, a collection of letters written by Jews during the Holocaust, associated with the HeHalutz movement.

The "For the Generation" library focused on quality original literature, primarily from writers associated with the Zionist Labour Movement and working settlement, including Aharon Avraham Kabak, Haim Hazaz, Yehuda Burla, Zalman Shneour, Dvora Baron, Gershon Shofman, and even Nathan Alterman, whom Katznelson admired despite their different backgrounds. It also included works by Katznelson's personal friends like Moshe Beilinson and Shlomo Lavi. Among the first non-fiction books published were The Jews in Soviet Russia by Jacob Lestschinsky, works by socialist Zionist ideologues Ber Borochov and Nachman Syrkin, and the biography of Mahatma Gandhi, The Story of My Experiments with Truth. Exceptions in translation included works by Isaac Bashevis Singer and Chekhov, with translations making up approximately 30% of the books published.

Katznelson also "sought", to "rescue" the works of Bialik, Tchernichovsky and Agnon from Schocken's control and sell them to the public at low prices—though he did not succeed. He published few translations, mostly non-fiction and philosophy rather than literature. As editor, Katznelson stated: "I did not take it upon myself to provide what the audience demanded, but what I knew the audience needed." The publishing house maintained "high standards" of printing and language, with Katznelson implementing systematic partial Hebrew diacritics to make texts more accessible.

In its first year, Am Oved published 36 books. The first was a historical-literary anthology called The Book of Heroism, followed by Deeds and Trends, a partial summary of the study month Katznelson organized in Rehovot in 1941. The publishing house also developed a subscription system, and in its first full year (1942-1943), distributed 150,000 copies to a Yishuv, a Jewish community of only 450,000.

=== 1944–1993: expansions ===
Katznelson managed Am Oved for only two years, until he died in 1944. His passing led to a "crisis in the publishing house," marked by financial difficulties, poor management, and the Histadrut's refusal to inject additional funds. They also had to reduce staff.

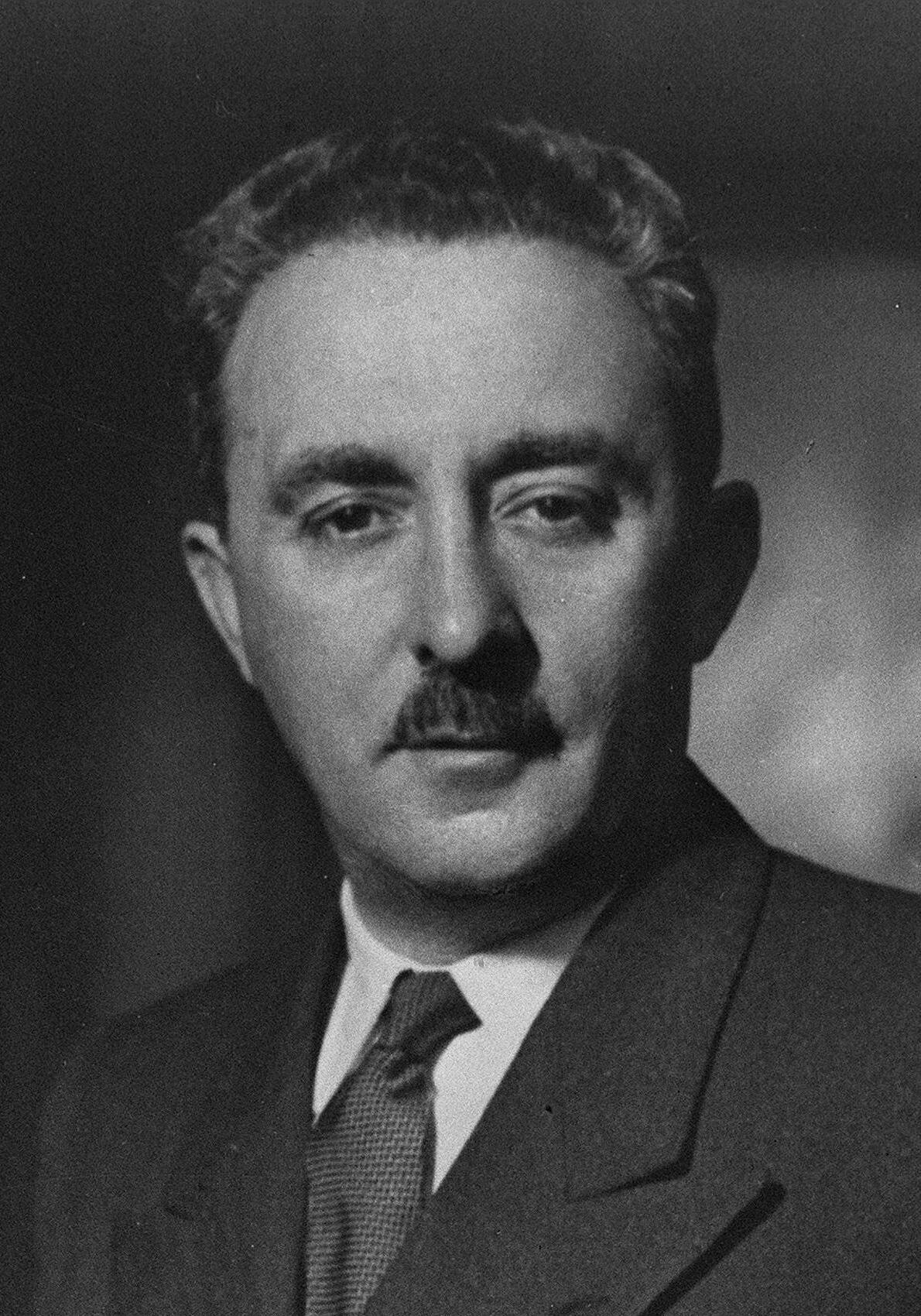
Moshe Sharett's portrait dates to 1952

However, in 1956, former Prime Minister, Moshe Sharett was appointed CEO of Am Oved after his resignation, following "sharp" disagreements with Prime Minister David Ben-Gurion, giving the publishing house "renewed momentum." Followed in 1959, the "Yalkut" publishing house of the Haifa Workers' Council merged with Am Oved.

In June 1960, Sharett gave a lecture to secretaries of workers’ councils at the Histadrut's Workers' Committee House. He discussed the challenges of Hebrew publishing in a “small nation and a people of immigrants” still acquiring their language. He noted that most of Am Oved's books published in the past three years –60 new titles and 40 reissues– were at a financial loss, as part of its cultural "mission" rather than for commercial gain. Sharett highlighted the success of the "Library for the People" series, which had sold over one million copies at prices as low as a pack of cigarettes. He saw this as proof of its cultural potential and emphasized that “much more can be done in this direction.” With the support of Zionist workers’ committees, he promoted the series by arranging for the heads of workers' committees to purchase books in advance for distribution to workers at discounted prices. This ensured that every book published had a guaranteed audience. Bank Hapoalim also financed the production of youth and children's books, which were likewise released monthly. Around the same time, many authors—especially from the Workers’ Library of the National Kibbutz—joined Am Oved, as the publisher adopted its recognizable format: "a small book with minimal design."

Author Haim Beer, who began his career as a proofreader at Am Oved in 1966 and later became a senior editor, recalled the Library for the People at its peak as a "powerful cultural concept" rooted in the ideals of a socialist society. He said it had 24,000 subscribers and that "the workers' committees were strong, and they were a tool, the most important instrument of the publishing house. We gave them a book as a gift every month at a subsidized price, sometimes at a loss, and this was a library for the people. The goal was to bring basic books." Beer noted that the core idea in "Israeli society" was the belief that progress in life depends on access to books, a notion rooted in "classic socialist ideology." However, he also acknowledged that this approach could be perceived as condescending: "give a book at a discount, maybe you're trying to create indoctrination."

=== 1994–present ===
Between 1994 and 2014, Am Oved collaborated with Compedia to develop and produce computer games for children, based on the character "Itamar" by author David Grossman. The most famous game in the series was Itamar Walks on Walls. In 2002, to celebrate its 60th anniversary, Am Oved partnered with the Steimatzky bookstore chain for a campaign where readers voted for their six favorite books of all time. The selected books, reissued as "The Chosen Six", were:

- Russian Romance by Meir Shalev
- The Catcher in the Rye by J. D. Salinger
- Love in the Time of Cholera and One Hundred Years of Solitude by Gabriel García Márquez
- A Trumpet in the Wadi by Sami Michael
- The Little Prince by Antoine de Saint-Exupéry

From 2000 to 2011, Yaron Sadan served as CEO of the publishing house.

In December 2011, retired police officer Yaakov (Jackie) Bray was appointed as the CEO, replacing Sadan, who stepped down after 12 years. Bray had previously served as Deputy Head of the Investigations and Intelligence Division in the Israel Police and was known for his background in economic crime investigations. His appointment sparked internal controversy, particularly from Roni Feinstein, chairman of Am Oved's board of directors, who resigned in protest. Feinstein claimed the appointment was pushed by Histadrut Chairman Ofer Eini, bypassing standard procedures and ignoring candidates identified by a search committee. He described the process as a "major scandal" and criticized the lack of transparency and disregard for literary or publishing experience.

This was followed by the departure of editor and translator Ilana Hammerman, who had worked with the publishing house for 25 years. Hammerman viewed the appointment as symbolically troubling, particularly within the context of Israeli civil society. Other editors also expressed protest, although they stated they had no intention of resigning. A petition against the appointment was also launched online, and sent to Shimon Peres. The petition claims Israeli literature is in crisis due to the dominance of Steimatzky and Tzomet Sfarim, which diverts most book revenues away from publishers and authors. It criticizes the flood of low-cost, poorly edited books, while praising Am Oved for maintaining high standards and urging preservation of its legacy founded by Katznelson. Shortly after, a professor, Hanan Hever, head of the Hebrew University's School of Literature, also criticized the appointment in an article published in Haaretz, he wrote that "his very appointment is a clear act of cultural bullying." The Histadrut defended the decision, stating Bray was unanimously approved for his managerial qualifications and crisis leadership skills, noting that many executives in Israel come from security backgrounds. Bray himself described his new role as "a challenge to connect action with spirit."

In summer 2014, the publishing house encountered difficulties due to a large unpaid debt by the Steimatzky chain and implementation of the Israeli Book Law. Only after filing for liquidation against Steimatzky was the debt paid.

In October 2015, Chanital Suissa was appointed CEO, after Jackie Brie resigned for unexplained reasons. It was noted that Suissa, like her predecessors, she had no background in literature. Her previous role was at the Histadrut, where she served as Director General. This raised doubts about her suitability to lead a cultural institution long associated with highbrow literature. Her connection to Omri Cohen, former CEO of the Histadrut, led to allegations of nepotism, which she denied. Over time, she gained support by maintaining Am Oved's literary focus while gradually introducing more commercial titles to help stabilize finances.

== Book Series ==
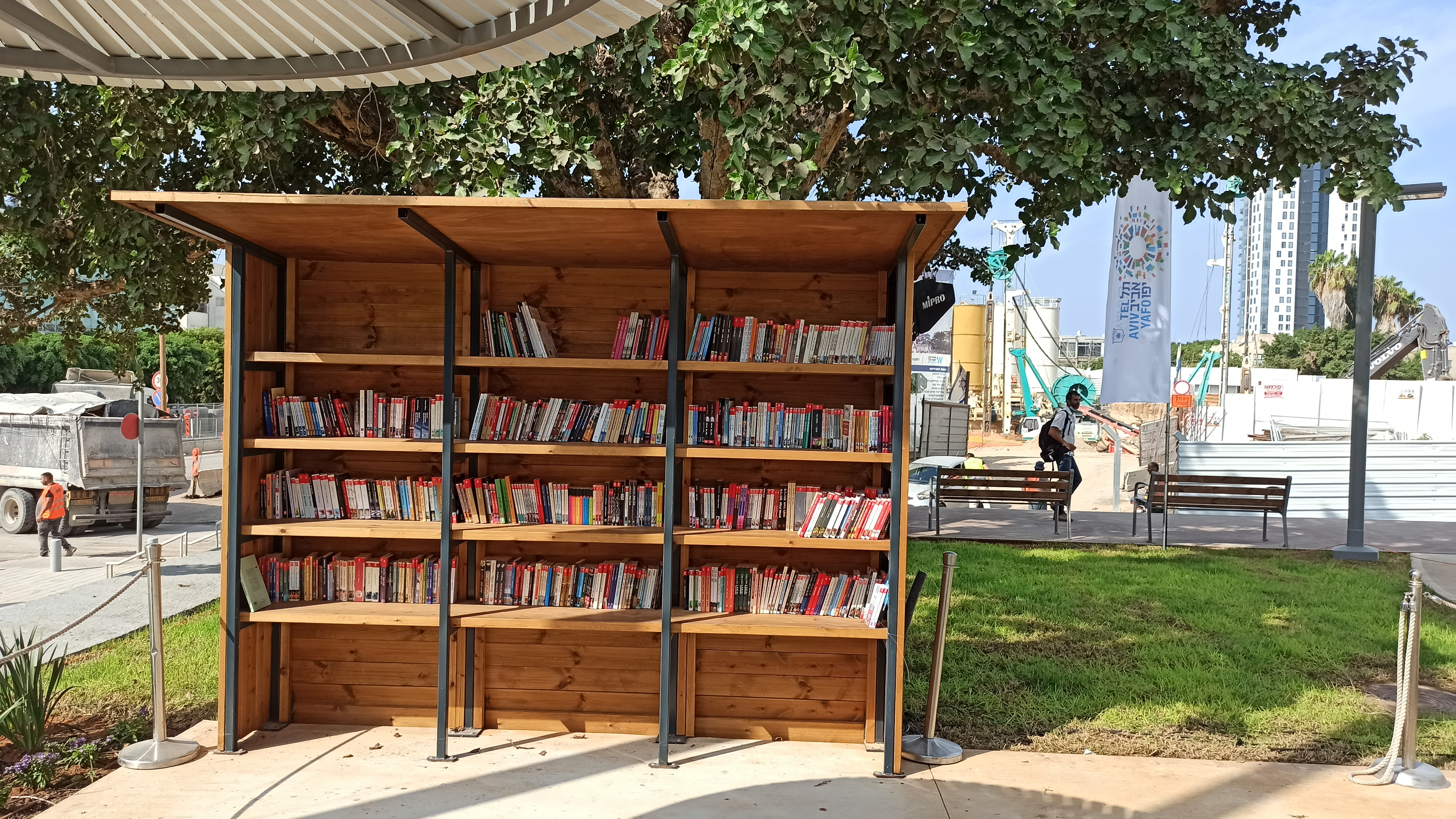
A library with Am Oved books in the Histadrut garden near the Executive Committee House.

The publishing house maintains two prominent series, featuring both translated and original works.

- Sifriya La'Am (People's Library or Library for the people) – A fiction and non-fiction series, relaunched and renumbered in April 1958, releases approximately 12 Hebrew books each year—some original, others translated. First launched in 1955, the series has maintained its popularity for decades.
- Sifriyat Afikim (The Horizons Library) – is a non-fiction book series published in November 1969, it was originally defined as a library for the problems of contemporary society," but over time, its scope expanded to include a wide range of subjects, primarily in the social sciences and humanities. The series also includes reference books across diverse fields, written by both Israeli and international writers.

Notable past series include:

- Dan Hiskhan Book Club (1963-late 1980s) – Published 160 children's books including many classics. Edited by T. Carmi, Haim Be'er and Nira Harel.
- Am Oved Science Fiction – Featured renowned translations including The Best of Science Fiction and the Dune series.
- The original series "Lador" (For the Generation), "Shahorut" (Youth) and "Min Hamoked" (From the Frontlines) launched with the publishing house in 1942, later merged into other series.

It also published the following magazines:

- Alfiyim (Two Thousand magazine) – a Multidisciplinary Journal of review, thought, and literature – was a biannual journal published from 1989 to 2009. It featured articles in the social sciences and humanities, alongside contributions in other fields of knowledge, as well as original poetry.
- Economics Quarterly – is an academic journal focused on economic issues. It originally began as a journalistic economic publication and has been in continuous publication since 1953, making it one of the longest-running periodicals in the field in Israel.

== Critical reception ==
The publishing house was seen as an important link in the alliance between the Hebrew "working class" and the "intelligentsia," a bond that formed the basis of Labor Zionism's ideology. In 2017, it was noted that over the 75 years since its founding, Am Oved had published thousands of titles, becoming a "central and influential force in Israeli cultural world." Its catalog was highlighted for including "Israeli classics," a wide range of translations, and "beloved" children's books that generations have grown up with. Emphasizing that "the story of the publishing house itself is full of tensions and contradictions: between elitism and popularism, between a for-profit business and a body with a vision and public goals, between the desire to "educate" the public and the need to cater to its tastes, and of course the upheavals that printed literature has undergone that threaten, perhaps, to remove it from the world."

== See also ==
- Culture of Israel
