= Mamilla Mall =

Mall in West Jerusalem

Coordinates: 31°46′38.33″N 35°13′33.38″E

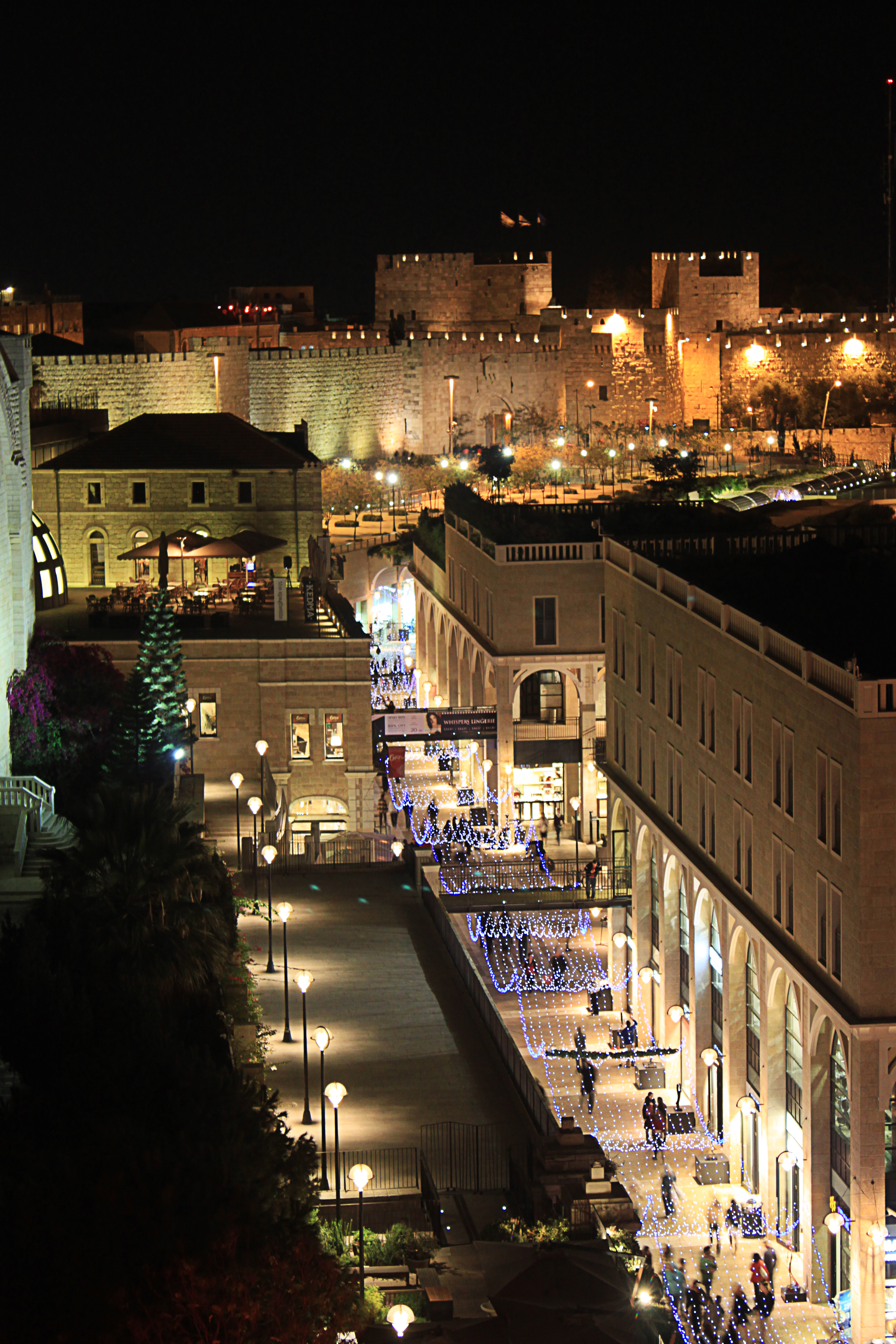
- Mamilla Mall at night, with Old City Walls in background
- Alternative names: Alrov Mamilla Avenue

General information
- Status: Completed
- Location: Jerusalem
- Construction started: 1997
- Completed: 2008
- Opened: 2007–2008
- Cost: $150 million
- Owner: Alrov Properties and Lodgings Ltd.

Dimensions
- Other dimensions: 2,000-foot (610 m) pedestrian promenade

Design and construction
- Architect: Moshe Safdie

Other information
- Number of stores: 140
- Parking: 1600 spaces

Website
- http://www.alrovmamilla.com/en

Mamilla Mall, also called Alrov Mamilla Avenue, is an upscale shopping street and the only open-air mall in West Jerusalem. Located northwest of Jaffa Gate, the mall consists of a 2,000-foot (610 m) pedestrian promenade called Alrov Mamilla Avenue lined by 140 stores, restaurants, and cafes, and office space on upper floors. It sits atop a multi-story parking garage for 1,600 cars and buses, and a bus terminal. Designed by Moshe Safdie and developed by Alrov Properties and Lodgings Ltd. of Tel Aviv, the mall incorporates the facades of 19th-century buildings from the original Mamilla Street, as well as the original structures of the Convent of St. Vincent de Paul, the Stern House, and the Clark House.

The mall is part of the Alrov Mamilla Quarter, a $400 million mixed-use development that also includes the 28-acre (11 ha) David's Village luxury condominium project, the David Citadel Hotel, the Alrov Mamilla Hotel, and the Karta parking lot. While the overall project was approved by the municipality in the early 1970s, and most of the condominiums and the David Citadel Hotel were completed in the 1990s, construction of the mall was delayed time and again – first due to opposition by preservationist, environmentalist, and religious groups, and then due to bureaucratic disputes, litigation, and arbitration. The mall was finally completed and opened in stages from 2007 to 2008, thirty-seven years after its initial proposal.

== Stores ==
In the Mamilla mall there are a number of leading brands in the world, such as Tommy Hilfiger, Dior, Padani, The North Face, Adidas, Nike, Pierre Cardin, Diesel, Swarovski, Rolex, Foot Locker, Mango, Zara, Stradivarius, Tous, Marccain, Columbia, H.stern, TopShop and many others.

== Location ==
Mamilla Mall runs perpendicular to the Old City Walls between Jaffa Road and Yitzhak Kariv Street. It opens onto the intersection of King Solomon, King David, and Agron Streets at its northern end, and Jaffa Gate at its southern end.

== History ==
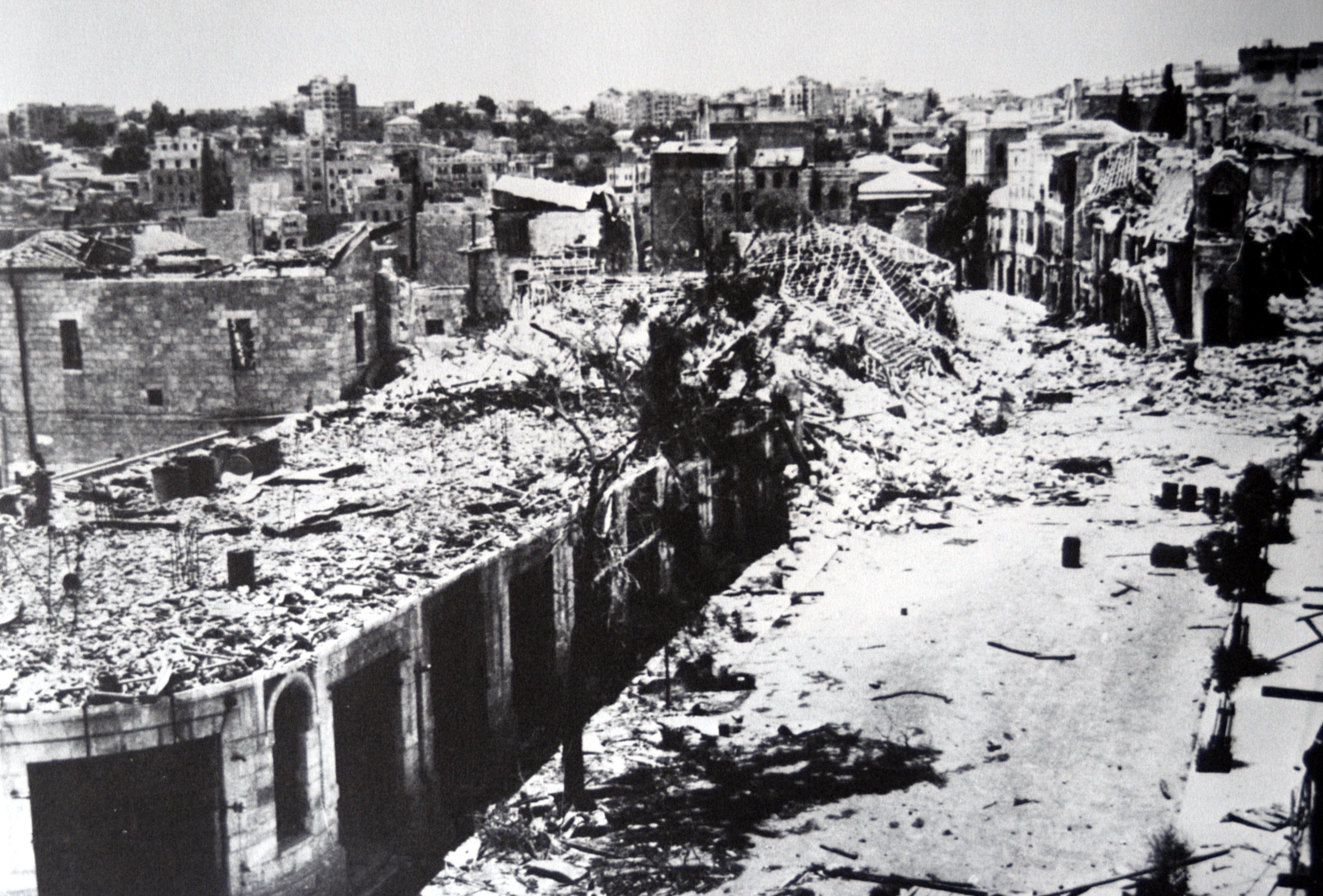
Ruins of the Mamilla commercial street after the 1948 Arab–Israeli War

The original Mamilla Street extended from the Mamilla Pool to Jaffa Gate. Along this street, wealthy Arabs constructed homes, offices and stores in the 1800s. Toward the end of the 19th century, and especially during the British Mandate era, the street became a fashionable commercial district. Both Arab and Jewish businessmen operated high-end shops for furniture, textiles, housewares, art, photography, and automobile showrooms.

In response to the announcement of the United Nations Partition Plan, Arab mobs stormed Mamilla Street on December 2, 1947, ransacking and setting fire to 40 Jewish-owned stores. Jewish merchants fled the area, which then came under heavy bombardment during the 1948 Arab–Israeli War. With the cessation of hostilities, the area became a no man's land dividing the Jordanian-occupied Old City from Jewish West Jerusalem, until a truce was signed in 1952. In the 1950s, poor Sephardic immigrant families and tradesmen took up occupancy in the derelict buildings, and workshops and auto-repair garages replaced the former stores.

In 1970 the Jerusalem municipality proposed to overhaul the slum-like area and replace it with a mixed-use development of luxury housing, hotels, and shops. Mayor Teddy Kollek asked architects Moshe Safdie and Gilbert Weil to draw up a plan. The two submitted a "grandiose" scheme that called for the construction of a subterranean traffic system, over-ground buildings, a pedestrian promenade, parking for 1,000 cars, and a bus terminal. All of Mamilla's historic buildings except for the Convent of St. Vincent de Paul would be demolished under the plan. The stated goal was to create a "living bridge" connecting the Old City with the New City of Jerusalem.

While the plan was approved by the city in 1972, it aroused keen opposition from preservationist, environmentalist, and religious groups. In response to the outcry, the city department of town planning submitted a scaled-back design calling for an above-ground traffic system, a pedestrian plaza fronting Jaffa Gate, the retention of facades along Mamilla and King Solomon Streets, and the demolition of historic buildings only in the heart of the Mamilla valley. Though Safdie incorporated these suggestions into a new plan submitted in 1976, opposition continued unabated by such bodies as the Jerusalem District Planning Commission, the Jerusalem Merchants Association, and the Council for a Beautiful Israel. Nevertheless, in the 1970s, the city spent NIS 130 million to move over 700 families out of Mamilla to the Neve Yaakov, Pisgat Ze'ev, Katamon, and Baka neighborhoods. Workshops and garages were relocated to Talpiot, where they formed the core of the nascent Talpiot industrial zone.

The Ladbroke Group of London, which won the original tender to develop the Mamilla project in 1989, pulled out in the early 1990s and development was handed over to Alfred Akirov of the Alrov Group of Tel Aviv. In the 1990s, Akirov completed 120 out of a planned 200 units in the David's Village condominium complex, and the David Citadel Hotel. But construction of the mall was delayed again and again due to bureaucratic disputes, litigation, arbitration, and political intervention by Israeli government ministers as Akirov and the government-owned development firm, Karta, went head-to-head on building rights, responsibilities, and compensation. In the 1990s Akirov changed the approved plan for covered arcades on the pedestrian promenade to open-air arches, adding 2,000 square metres (22,000 sq ft) of retail space; he also pushed for an entertainment complex with nine cinemas to be installed next to the Convent of St. Vincent de Paul, an idea that the city had vetoed years earlier. (Following Orthodox Jewish protest, Akirov cancelled the cinema complex.) When the government refused to approve Akirov's zoning changes, Akirov sued Karta and froze construction on the mall for several years, leaving a swath of half-finished buildings and construction cranes in clear view of Jaffa Gate and the Old City Walls.

In August 2006 the Jerusalem District Court upheld three earlier arbitration rulings and ordered Karta to pay Akirov NIS 100 million for project delays. Akirov resumed construction and opened the center in stages from 2007 to 2008, bringing closure to a 37-year project that normally should have taken five to ten years. The 194-room Alrov Mamilla Jerusalem Hotel, anchored on the north side of the mall, opened in June 2009.

== Architecture ==
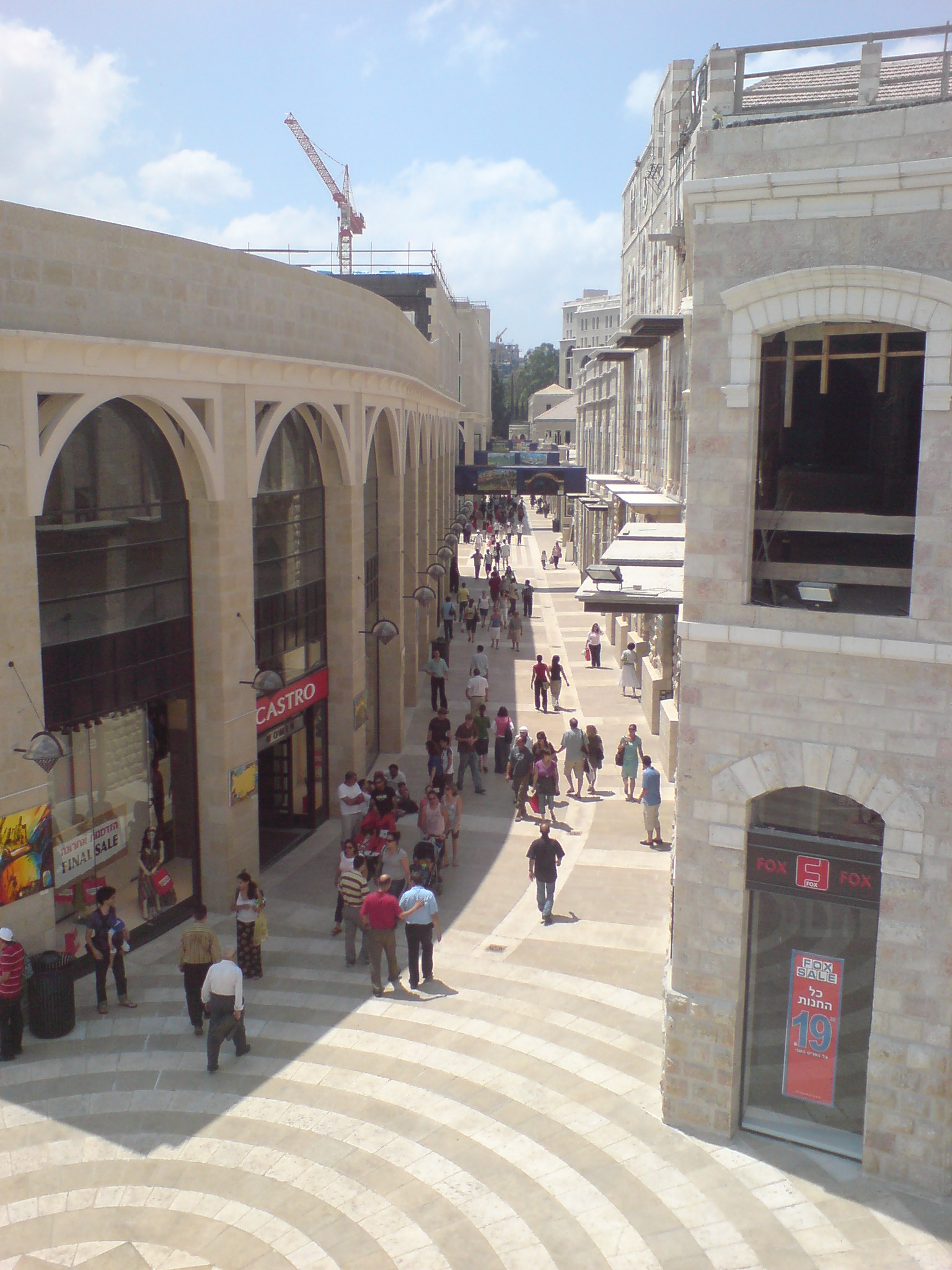
New construction (left) and historic facades (right) in Mamilla Mall

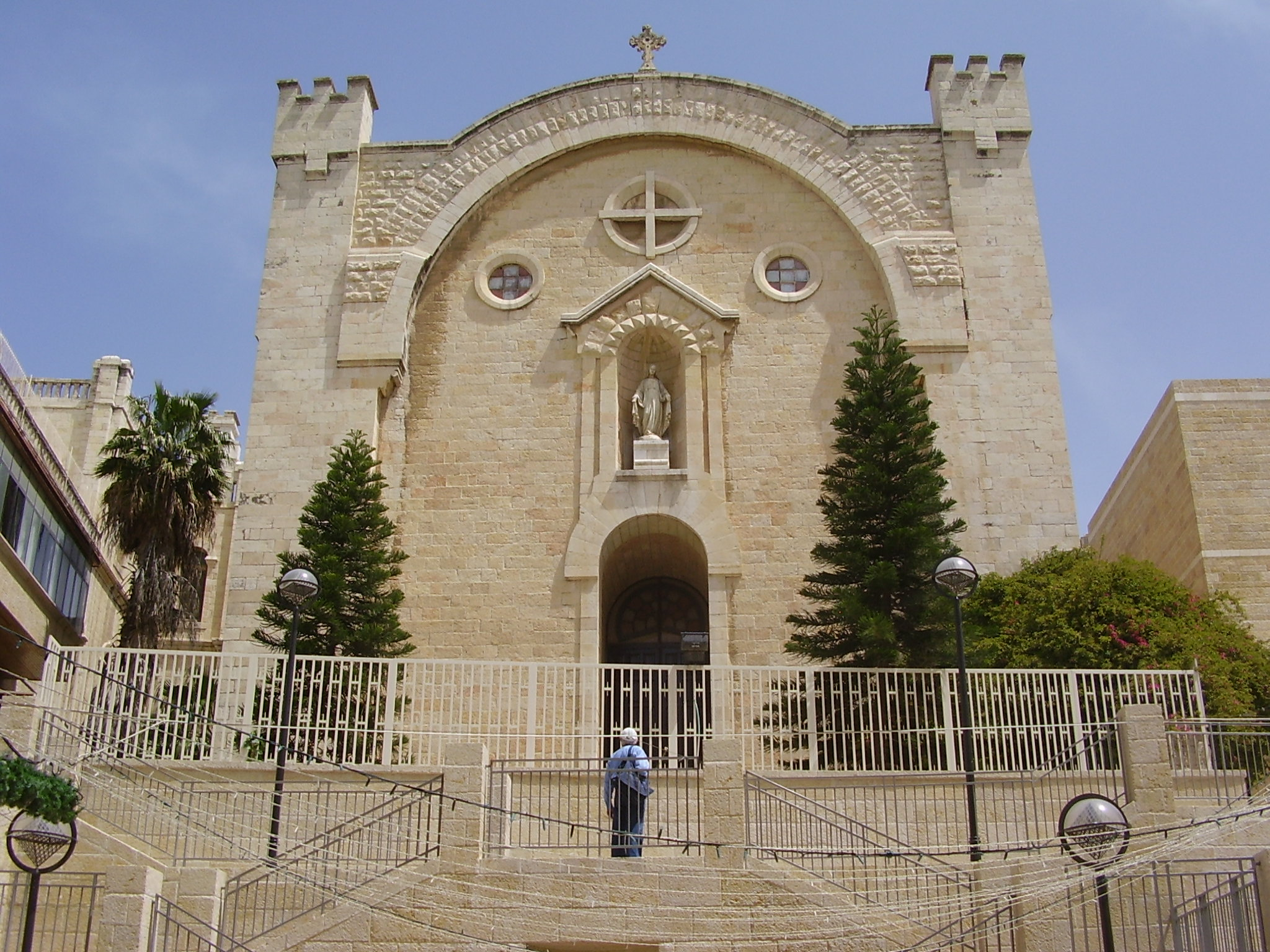
Convent of St. Vincent de Paul

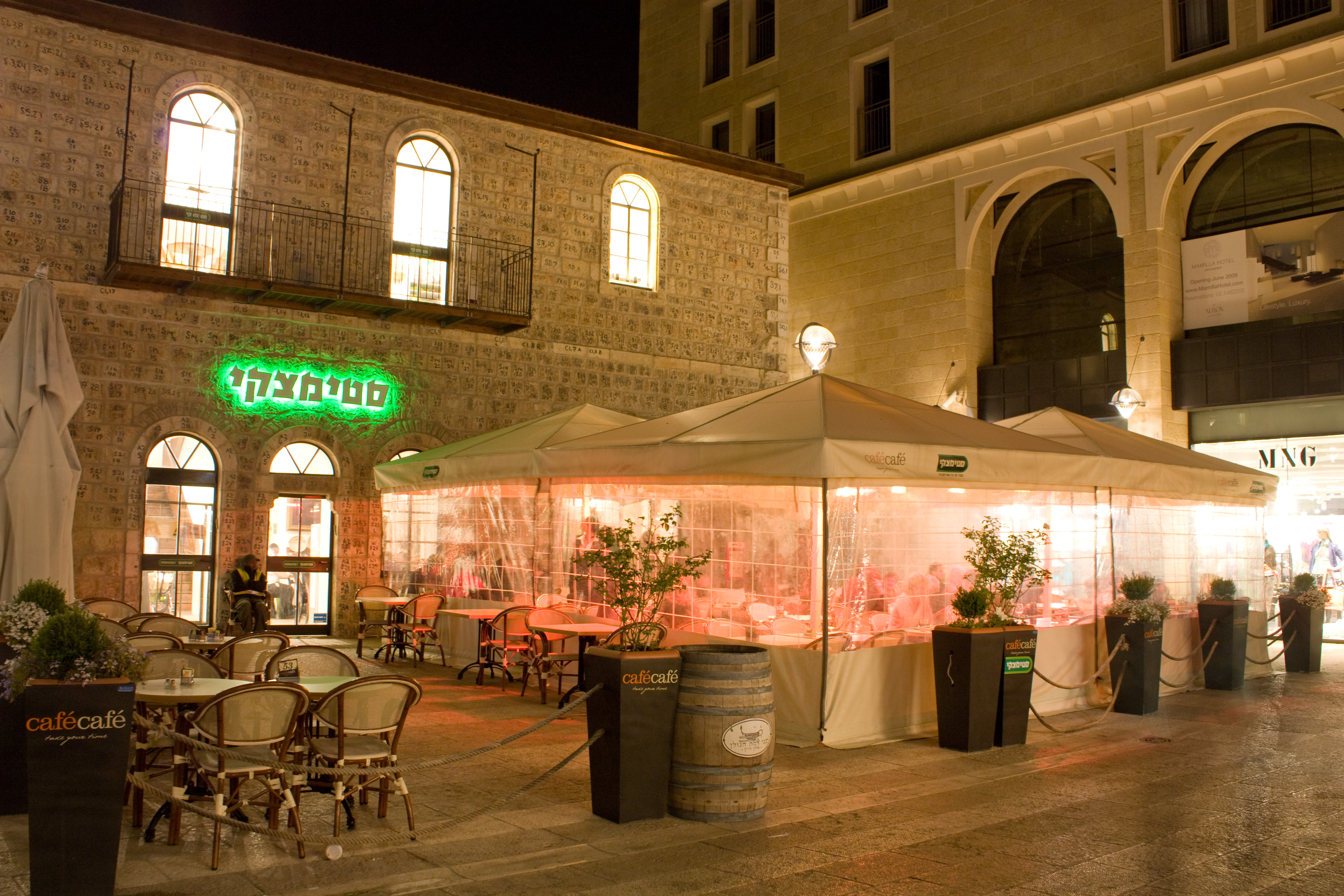
Stern House

Mamilla Mall, along with the other components of the Alrov Mamilla Quarter, was designed by Israeli architect Moshe Safdie. With an eye to the historical and archaeological importance of the area, Safdie opted to blend the mall into its surroundings rather than introduce a contemporary design. To that end, he chose materials and construction styles similar to those of the historic Mamilla neighborhood – namely, masonry-block construction and a predominance of arches. Facades removed from 19th-century buildings on the original Mamilla Street were placed on new construction in the mall.

Safdie commented on the task before him, writing:

Mindual of the pitfalls of downtown interventions elsewhere, could I do better? Could I provide parking without creating walls of parking garages along urban streets? Could I organize the lively bazaars of the Old City to form a continuum with other shopping streets in the district? Could I create a new center that meshed with the city around its entire perimeter? Could I, as the architect, guarantee a truly public character in Mamilla's streets and piazzas, and avoid the privitized ambiance of so many urban malls?

Several historic buildings were integrated into the mall design. These are:

- Clark House, an 1898 structure built by American evangelists living in Jerusalem. The building stands on its original site and was renovated by the architectural firm.
- Convent of St. Vincent de Paul, operated by the Daughters of Charity, an order of French nuns. Housing an orphanage, old-age home, and a shelter for mentally and physically handicapped people, it was the first structure to be erected on Mamilla Street, in 1886. It, too, occupies its original site.
- Stern House, a private home in which Zionist leader Theodor Herzl had lodged overnight during his 1898 visit to Jerusalem. The house had become a Zionist shrine, with the room in which Herzl slept given over to photos and memorabilia from Herzl's life. Though the house had been heavily damaged in the 1948 war, preservationists won a suit in the Israel Supreme Court to save it from demolition. The two-story masonry-block house, originally located at 18 Mamilla Street, was dismantled brick by brick and warehoused for ten years until builders were ready to reassemble it on Alrov Mamilla Avenue. Safdie left the colored numbers on the brick facades of this and other preserved houses to emphasize the preservation nature of the work. The Stern House presently houses a restaurant, bar, and Steimatzky bookstore.
- Seven additional 19th-century buildings were dismantled, warehoused, and reconstructed along the promenade.

The buildings along Alrov Mamilla Avenue are spaced irregularly rather than placed in a continuous line. The open areas between the buildings accommodate different types of public areas, while the spaces themselves afford views of the historic landmarks beyond the avenue, such as the Tower of David and Jaffa Gate. The buildings lining the avenue range in height from three to six stories, with the higher stories set back from the street line. There is also a two-story, domed atrium housing shops and restaurants.

The mall sits atop a six-story parking garage with space for 1,600 cars and 60 buses. From the outside, the over-ground structure appears as a series of tiered terraces overflowing with greenery. Skylights built into the terraces admit natural light to each parking level. Outside the entrances to the parking garage stand terminals for city buses.

Safdie writes:

Like urban centers elsewhere, Mamilla encompasses a mix of uses, but even the commercial structures facing the pedestrian street never present their backs to the city. On the contrary, apartments and offices are accessed from the surrounding streets. Parking is never visible. The two thousand parking spaces and major bus terminal in Mamilla tuck under Mamilla Street, fitted carefully into the topography so that all exterior walls become carefully planted terraced parks, connecting the historic valley and national park with the pedestrian streets above. ... Mamilla will seem to have been woven into the historic fabric of Jerusalem.

I consider this as a project of invisible mending, in the sense that each strand of fabric – each alley, each street, each mass of existing building – finds a continuity and counterpoint in the project that has been constructed in its midst.

At its southern end, the promenade opens onto a small, multi-tiered, landscaped park facing Jaffa Gate.

== Retail ==
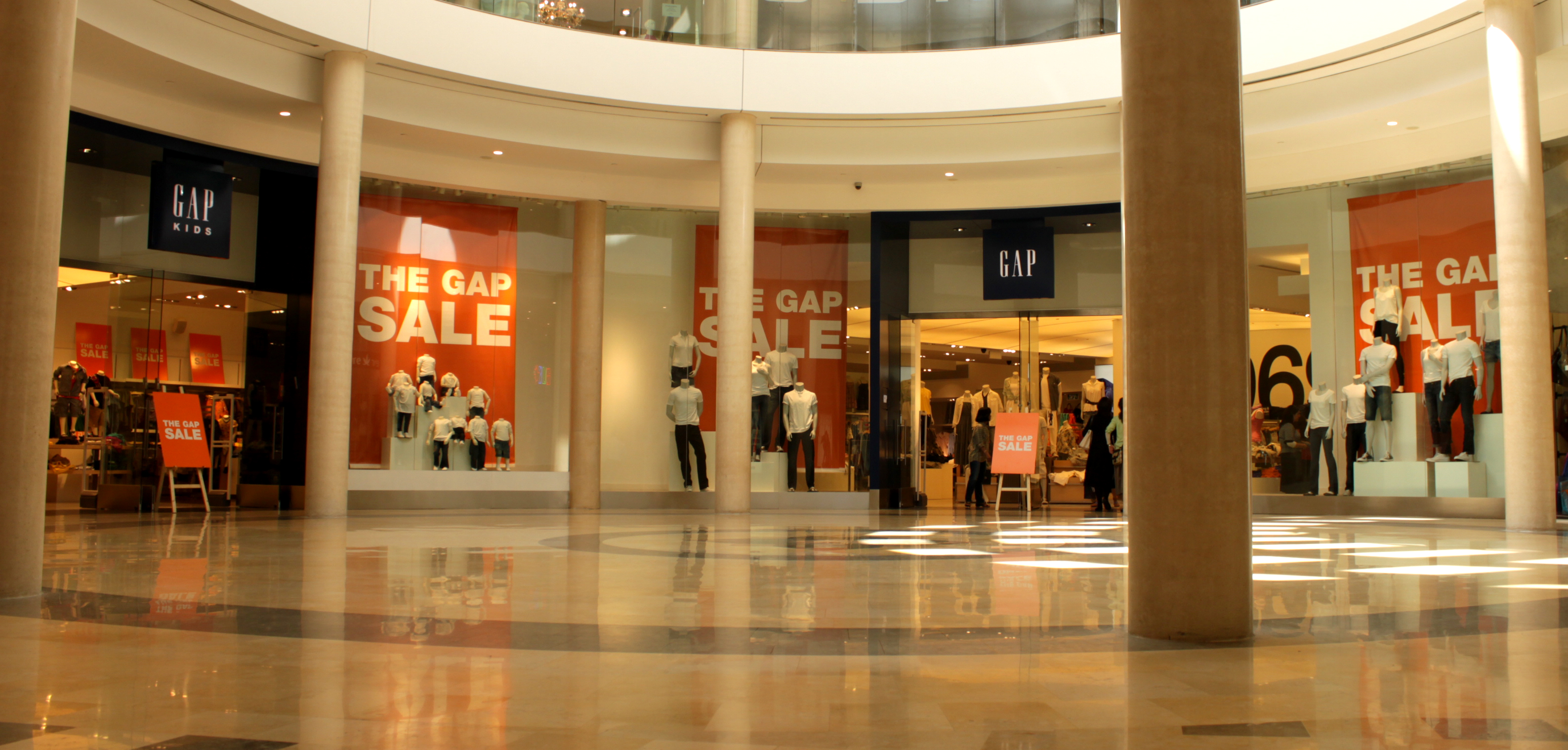
Gap store in the mall

Mamilla Mall contains 300,000 square feet (28,000 m^{2}) of retail space. Its 140 stores appeal to all economic strata, from high-end international chains Tommy Hilfiger and Abercrombie & Fitch; to Israeli designer boutiques such as Castro, Dorin Frankfurt, and Ronen Chen; to mid-range restaurants and a "supermarket-style" pharmacy. There are numerous chain stores selling fashions and cosmetics, as well as gift and souvenir stores. The Gap store, which opened in the mall in August 2009, is the chain's first store in Israel. Among the cafes are branches of Café Rimon, Aroma Espresso Bar, and Spaghettim.

Due to the diversity of retail establishments, the mall attracts a wide cross-section of Israeli residents and tourists. These include secular and religious Jews, Christians, Muslims, Armenian monks, young couples, families, and students. At the height of the summer and tourist seasons in July and August, an estimated 20,000 people visit the mall daily.

== Exhibitions and events ==
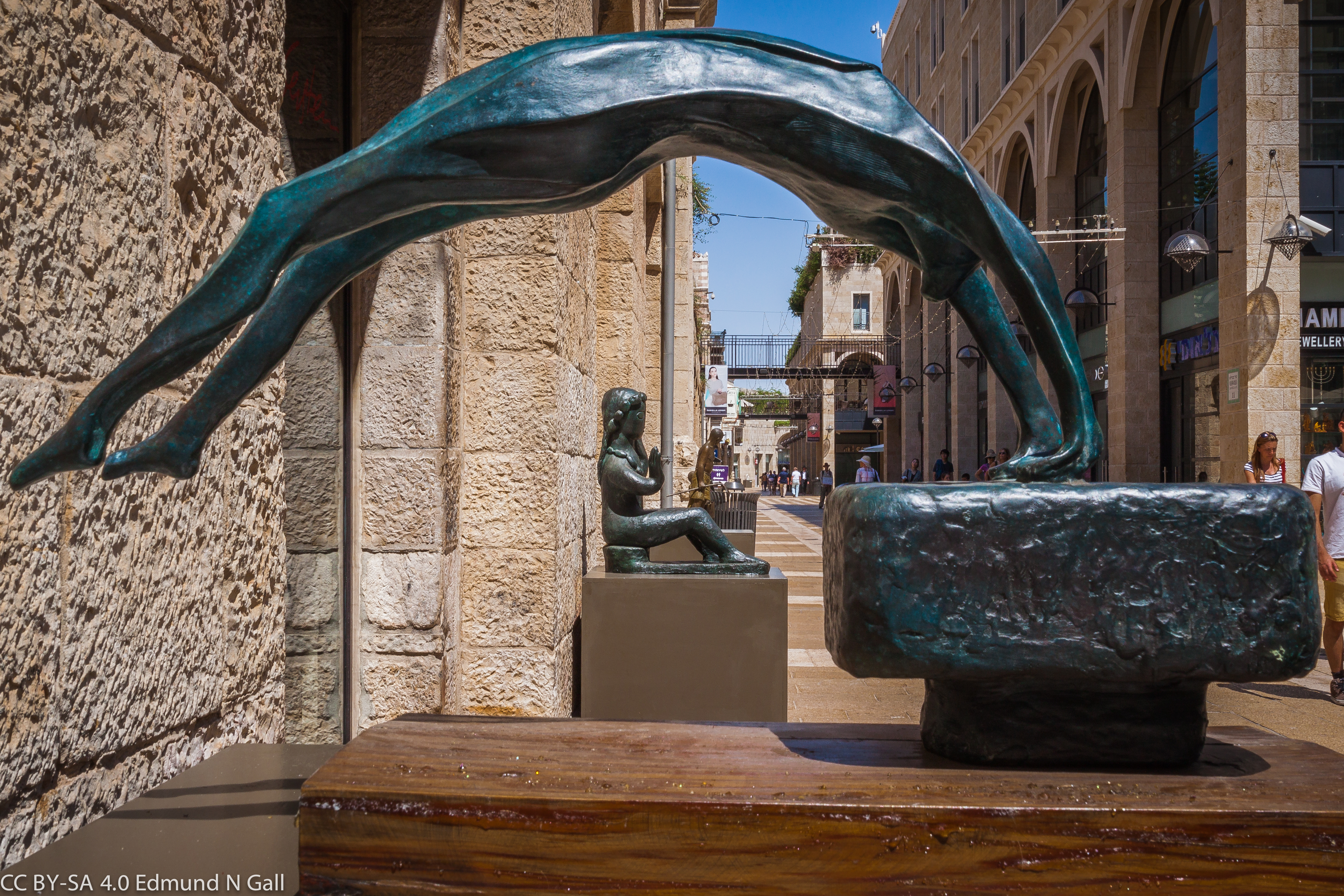
Sculptures displayed along the promenade

To appeal to its broad consumer base, the Alrov Group presents changing exhibits of sculpture and art along the promenade. All the pieces are by local artists, and most are for sale. During the summer and Jewish holidays, the mall hosts free concerts, street performances, folk dancing, and family activities. During Hanukkah, a Chabad candle-lighting ceremony takes place here nightly.

The mall has become a popular site for flash mobs, including those staged by nonprofit organizations to raise awareness for their activities.

== Attempted terror attack ==
In August 2013 the Shin Bet uncovered a plot by Hamas members from Ramallah and Jerusalem to bomb the Mamilla Mall on Rosh Hashana; two of the suspects were employed as maintenance workers at the mall.
