= Kinneret Zmora-Bitan Dvir =

Israeli book publisher

- Founded: 1919; 107 years ago
- Country of origin: Israel
- Publication types: Books
- Imprints: Kinneret, Zmora-Bitan, Dvir
- Official website: www.kinbooks.co.il

Kinneret Zmora-Bitan Dvir (Hebrew: כנרת זמורה ביתן דביר) is a book publishing company in Israel.

== History ==
The company's oldest imprint, Dvir, was founded in Odessa in 1919 by Hayim Nahman Bialik. After the Russian Revolution, Dvir moved to Berlin and in 1924, to Mandatory Palestine. Machbarot Lesifrut, the company's imprint for world literature in translation, was established by Israel Zmora in 1939. Zmora-Bitan was established in 1973 by Ohad Zmora and Asher Bitan. In 1986 Zmora-Bitan acquired Dvir, together with its affiliates Karni and Megiddo. Kinneret publishing house was founded by Yoram and Talma Roz in 1978.

Kinneret was among the first houses to produce and market books with cassettes, board books, and pop-up books for children.

As of 2010 Kinneret-Zmora employs a staff of 70. It publishes around 300 new titles annually. On the retail side, Kinneret partners with the major book retailer Tzomet Sefarim, which has about 40% of Israel's book retail market. The company is a member of the Book Publishers Association of Israel.
