= Stern House =

Coordinates: 31°46′39″N 35°13′28″E

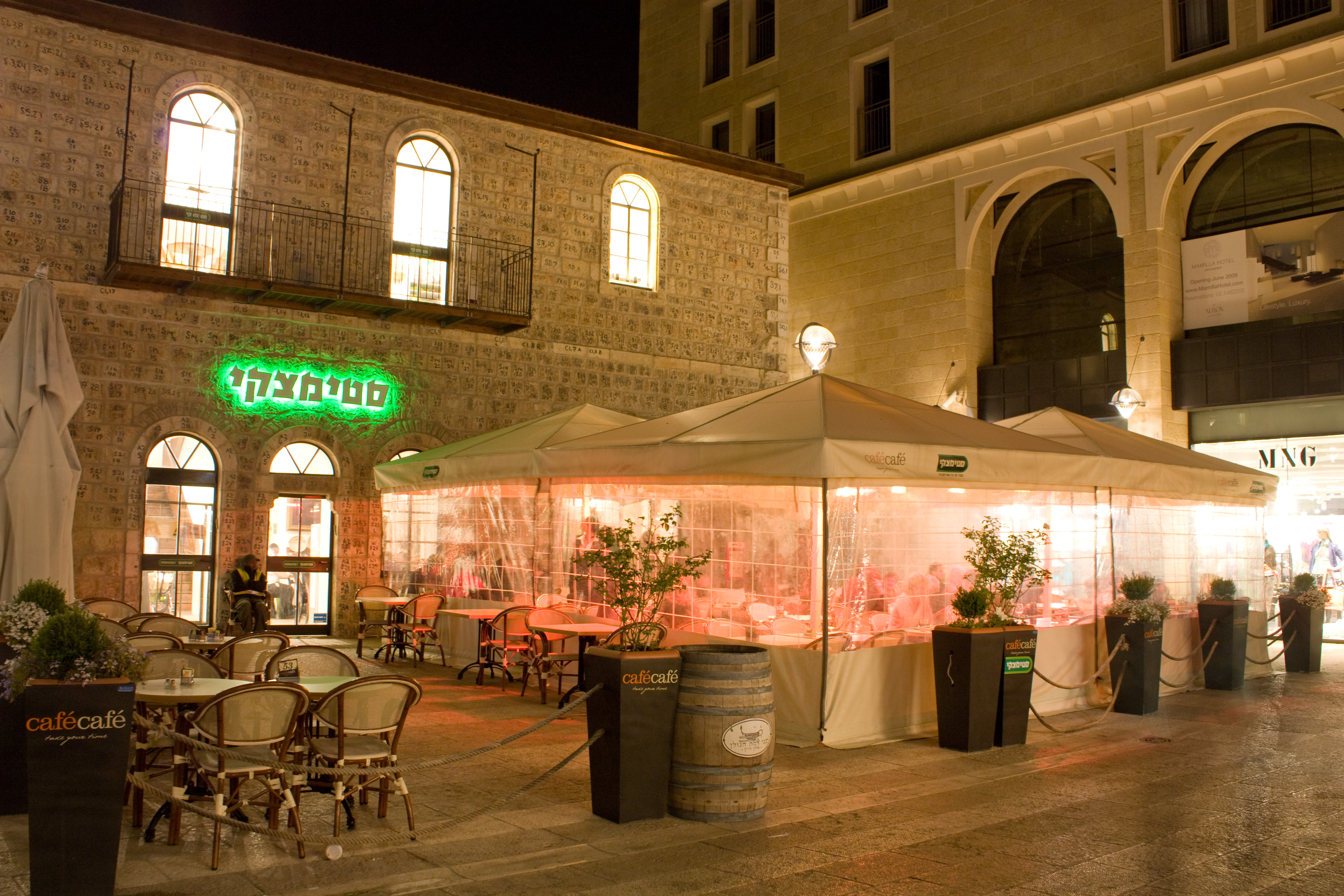
Stern House in 2009, housing a Steimatzky bookstore and cafe

The Stern House, (Hebrew: בית שטרן) is a preserved and reconstructed historic building in Jerusalem. The house was built in 1877 in Mamilla, one of the original neighborhoods outside the city walls, and was rescued during a major reconstruction of the same neighborhood in the late 20th and early 21st century.

The Stern House is notable for accommodating Theodor Herzl during his visit to Jerusalem in 1898. It currently serves as the Jerusalem "flagship store" of the Steimatzky bookstore chain and includes an outdoor cafe, as well as a small museum.

== History ==
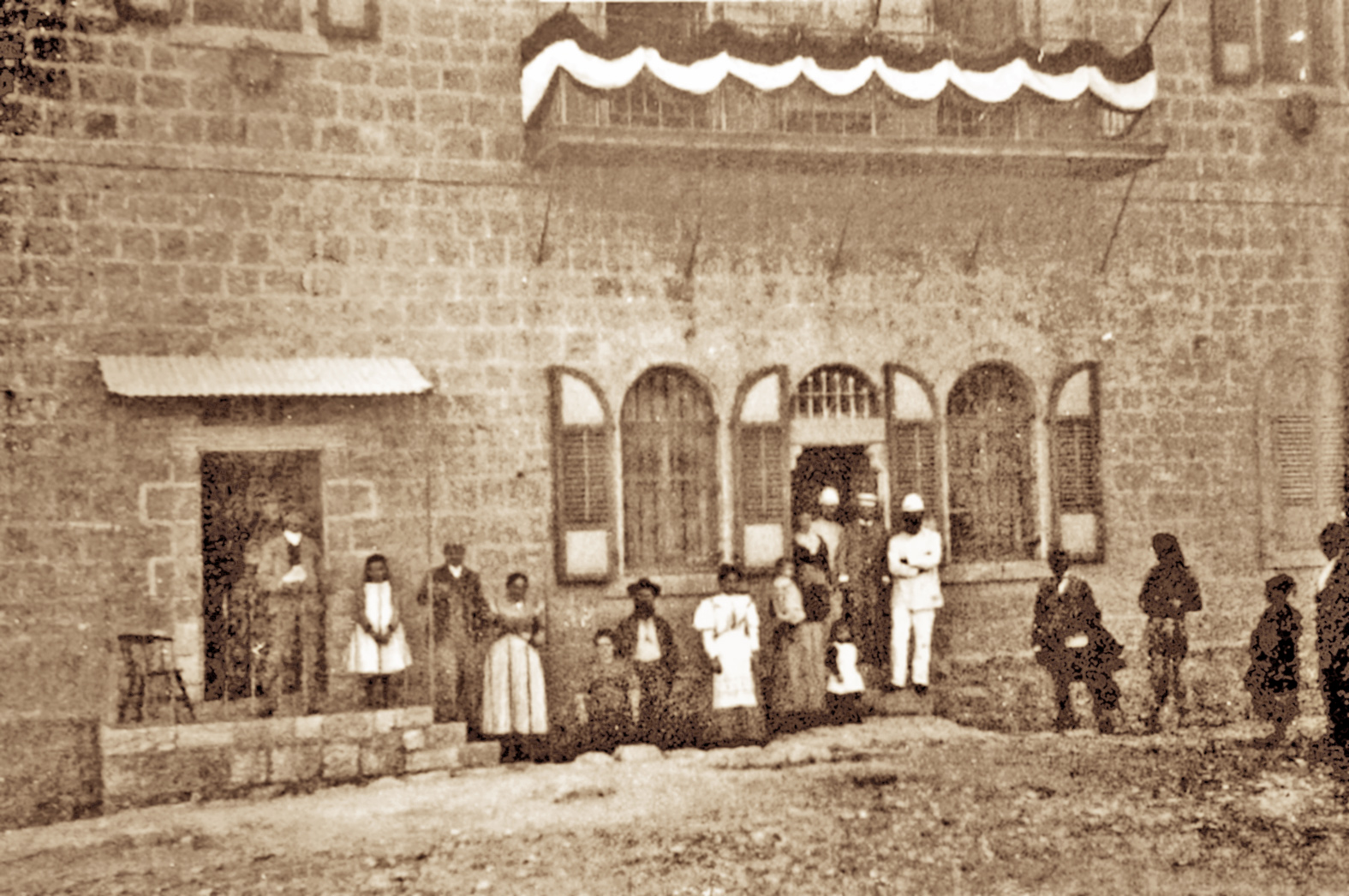
Theodor Herzl in front of the Stern House in 1898

The Stern House was built in 1877 for the Yehuda Stern family, recently emigrated from Germany. During the Ottoman period, denizens of Jerusalem lived for the most part within the Old City walls, and this was deemed too crowded for the wealthy industrialist and his family. Therefore, along with the wave of people leaving the Old City and building new neighborhoods outside its walls, Yehuda Stern purchased a plot of land at 18 Mamilla Street from the Greek Orthodox Church in the then-new urban expansion area of Mamilla, right outside Jaffa Gate, upon which he built a large house according to European standards. Several generations of the Stern family lived in the building throughout its years of existence.

=== Theodor Herzl visit ===
In 1898, German Emperor Wilhelm II set out for an historic visit to the Levant. He arrived in Jerusalem in November with the goal of strengthening German influence in the city, and to that end, he became involved in a number of mostly religious-oriented construction projects. Theodor Herzl arrived in Jerusalem at the same time, planning to meet with Wilhelm II and solicit his help in securing a homeland for the Jewish people. He arrived at the Jerusalem railway station late on a Friday, and planned to travel by horse and carriage to the Kaminitz Hotel, where he had booked a room. Being that Herzl was a leading Jewish figure, his aide David Wolffsohn persuaded him to make the long journey on foot, so as not to violate the Shabbat and the sensibilities of the local community, most of which consisted of ulra-religious Perushim. Herzl agreed to the request, even though he suffered from a fever. Upon his arrival at the hotel, Herzl was informed by proprietor Eliezer Lippmann that the room had been requisitioned by the Emperor's entourage. Taking pity on Herzl, Lippmann put him up in the hotel's corridor. Michael Stern, son of Yehuda, hearing about Herzl's predicament, took it upon himself to host the Zionist leader at his home, which became Herzl's base of operations for the duration of his stay in the city. Herzl remained at the house for 4 nights. Later on, the Stern family turned the room in which Herzl stayed into a small museum, documenting his visit to the city. The "Herzl Room" museum in the house was open throughout the era of the historic Mamilla neighborhood, and was operated for some time by Yehuda Stern's great-grandchildren.

=== Development and preservation ===
In the 1970s, a decision was made to develop the quarter and reconstruct it in accordance with the plans of the architect Moshe Safdie. The house became the focus of controversy during the major reconstruction efforts, as the original plans were such that almost nothing of the original quarter was slotted for preservation. The plans called for the demolition of a number of Ottoman and Mandate-era buildings, including the Stern House. The demolition plans provoked an outcry, and later an agreement was reached to preserve the Stern House and several other significant buildings.

While the house was set to be incorporated among the new buildings, the controversy did not end. Historic preservationists demanded that the building be preserved on its original site, and objected to a plan that entailed disassembling the building and reconstructing it on a nearby site. The legal challenge reached the High Court, which ultimately decided that a full restoration could be done even after deconstruction. The building was then disassembled and its stones were marked, numbered and moved to a storage area near the construction project.

The Mamilla project had further legal complications and feuds which dragged on for a number of years, causing delays in construction. Only in 2006, with the end of the prolonged litigation and a reach of a financial settlement, were the works resumed in the frozen section of the project. Following this, the Stern House was finally put back together after being stored away for a decade.

Architectural historian David Kroyanker finds the reconstructed building and the new neighborhood in which it is set, "close to perfection: it's aesthetic, it works - people come here in large numbers. It's alive and it is a very successful combination of old and new, of restoring this place to its former function - an economic center with leisure and entertainment."

== Bookstore and museum ==
The building now houses the Jerusalem "flagship store" of the Steimatzky bookstore chain, along with an outdoor cafe.

The lower level of the building houses a small, free museum focusing on the history of the bookstore chain and on Herzl's visit to Jerusalem. On display are photographs of Herzl in Jerusalem, Israeli bank notes featuring portraits of Herzl, and the hat that he wore on his visit to Jerusalem. The museum also depicts the history of the Steimatzky chain, including photographs of the long vanished Steimatzky branch in Beirut, Lebanon. The store's branches in Beirut, Baghdad, Cairo and Damascus were all nationalized after the establishment of the State of Israel in 1948.
