= G. Yafit =

Israeli businesswoman (1951–2021)

Yafit Greenberg
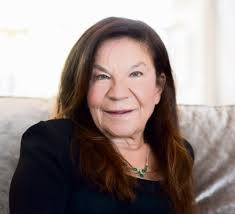
- Greenberg in 2020
- Born: 9 August 1951; Bnei Brak, Israel
- Died: 30 November 2021 (aged 70); Petah Tikva, Israel
- Burial place: Kiryat Shaul Cemetery
- Education: Bar-Ilan University
- Occupations: Advertiser; Businessperson

Yafit Greenberg (Hebrew: יפית גרינברג; 9 August 1951 – 30 November 2021), commonly known as G. Yafit (Hebrew: ג. יפית, Gimmel Yafit), was an Israeli businesswoman specialising in advertising.

== Biography ==
Greenberg was born Yaffa Maimon in Bnei Brak in 1951 to a traditional Jewish family who had immigrated from Tripoli in Libya, and was one of five daughters. She studied geography and education at Bar-Ilan University.

She began working in marketing for Lahitun magazine, before switching to advertising, establishing the G. Yafit company in 1977. The company initially posted advertisements in newspapers, the first of which was an advert for Tadiran refrigerators in Yedioth Ahronoth. When commercial television began broadcasting in 1993, she began offering low-cost advertisement slots in a similar style to the newspaper adverts. Her unusual advertising style saw her front the advert herself to talk about the product. Her daughter-in-law, Maya Yeshayahu, also began appearing alongside her in the adverts.

In June 2014 a group of investors led by G. Yafit acquired the Steimatzky bookstore chain from Markstone Capital Partners.

She died of cancer on 30 November 2021 at the age of 70.
