= Café Rimon =

Israeli kosher restaurant chain

Café Rimon (קפה רימון)

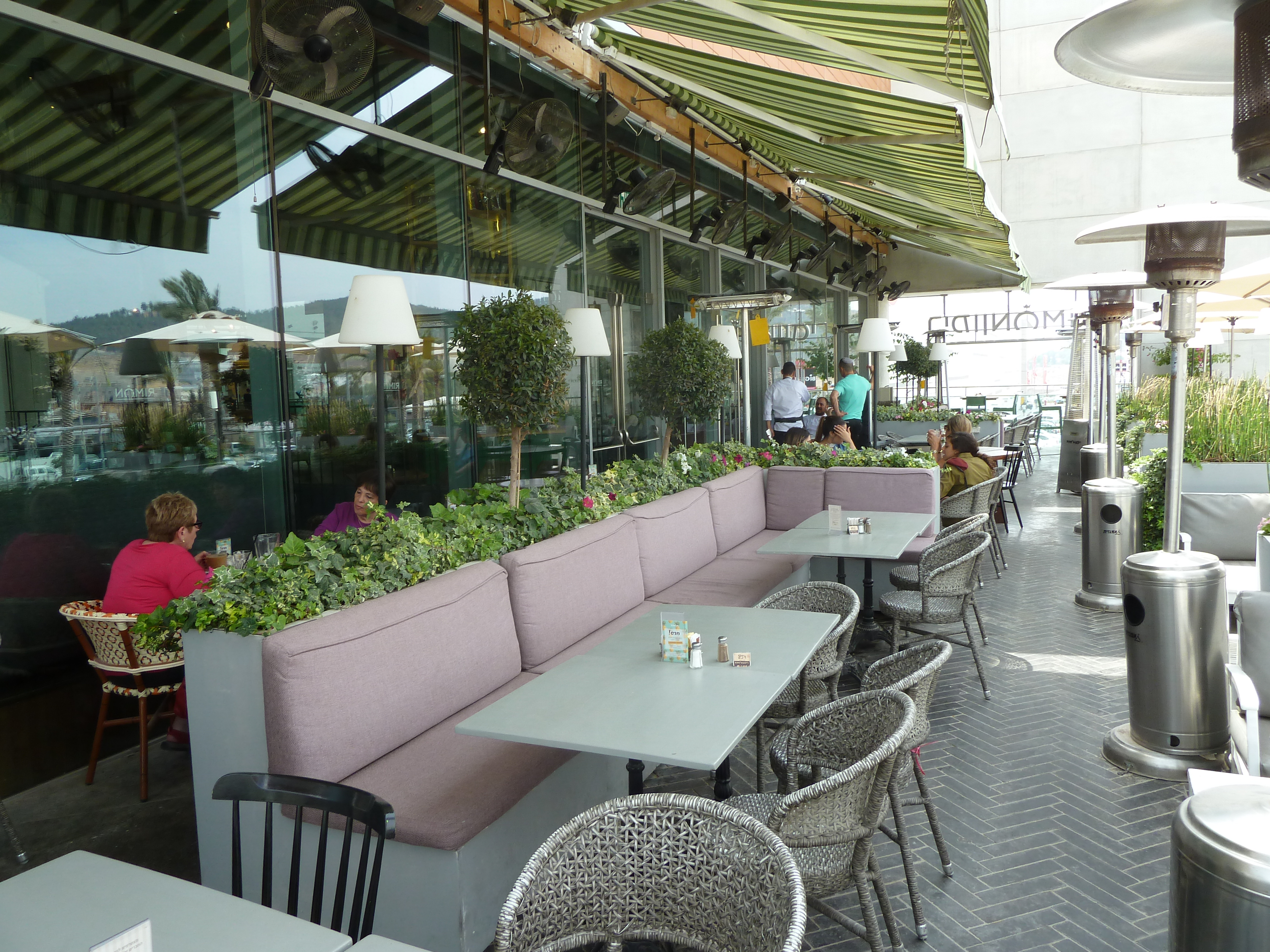
- Founded: Jerusalem (1953; 73 years ago)
- Headquarters: Israel
- Number of locations: 3
- Area served: Jerusalem District, Israel
- Website: caferimon.co.il

Café Rimon (Hebrew: קפה רימון) is a kosher restaurant chain in Israel with two locations in Jerusalem, and a third one located in Beit Shemesh. The cafe employs both Jews and Arabs despite being the site of multiple terror attacks.

== History ==
=== 20th century beginnings ===
Café Rimon opened its first location in 1953 near Ben Yehuda Street in Jerusalem. Originally, Café Rimon was a meat restaurant. In 1983 it switched to dairy.

=== 2001–2002: Terror attacks ===
On 1 December 2001 at 23:30, two suicide bombers positioned themselves at either side of Café Rimon and blew themselves up simultaneously, killing 10 and injuring 170. Palestinian President Yasser Arafat immediately condemned the attack. Additionally he called for an end to all suicide bombings and acts of terror against Israel. The cafe is located in an area that is normally packed with young people on Saturday nights.

In 2002 Jerusalem Police and Shin Bet arrested three East Jerusalem residents who were planning to poison Café Rimon patrons. Working with Hamas, they developed a poison that would be tasteless and would induce a heart attack approximately fifteen hours later. The perpetrators were: Sufian Bakri Abadi, age 23, head of the group, Utman Said Kianyah, age 23, a chef at the restaurant for three years and Moussa Nasser, age 22, who helped design the poison. All three were sentenced to 5–10 years in prison.

=== 2007–2014: Expansion ===
In 2007 Rimon Bistro was added to the Ben Yehuda location, serving as a meat restaurant. This location later closed down. Also in 2007, a second dairy location opened in Jerusalem. In 2014 another branch was opened in Beit Shemesh.

== Locations ==
=== Current ===
- Café Rimon Ben Yehuda is the flagship restaurant located on Luntz Street. This dairy location offers a variety of food including soup, salad, pizza, pasta and fish.
- Café Rimon Mamilla, Rimon's third location, opened in 2007, with the opening of the Mamilla Mall. This is the second dairy restaurant in the chain and is known for its large brunch buffets.
- Café Rimon Beit Shemesh, opened in 2014, is located in the Big Fashion Mall in Beit Shemesh.

=== Former ===
- Rimon Bistro, which opened in 2007, was on Luntz Street, attached to the Café Rimon Ben Yehuda location. Rimon Bistro was a steakhouse that offered a wide variety of meat options. It later closed.

== See also ==
- Israeli cuisine
- List of restaurants in Israel
