= Ronen Chen =

Israeli fashion designer

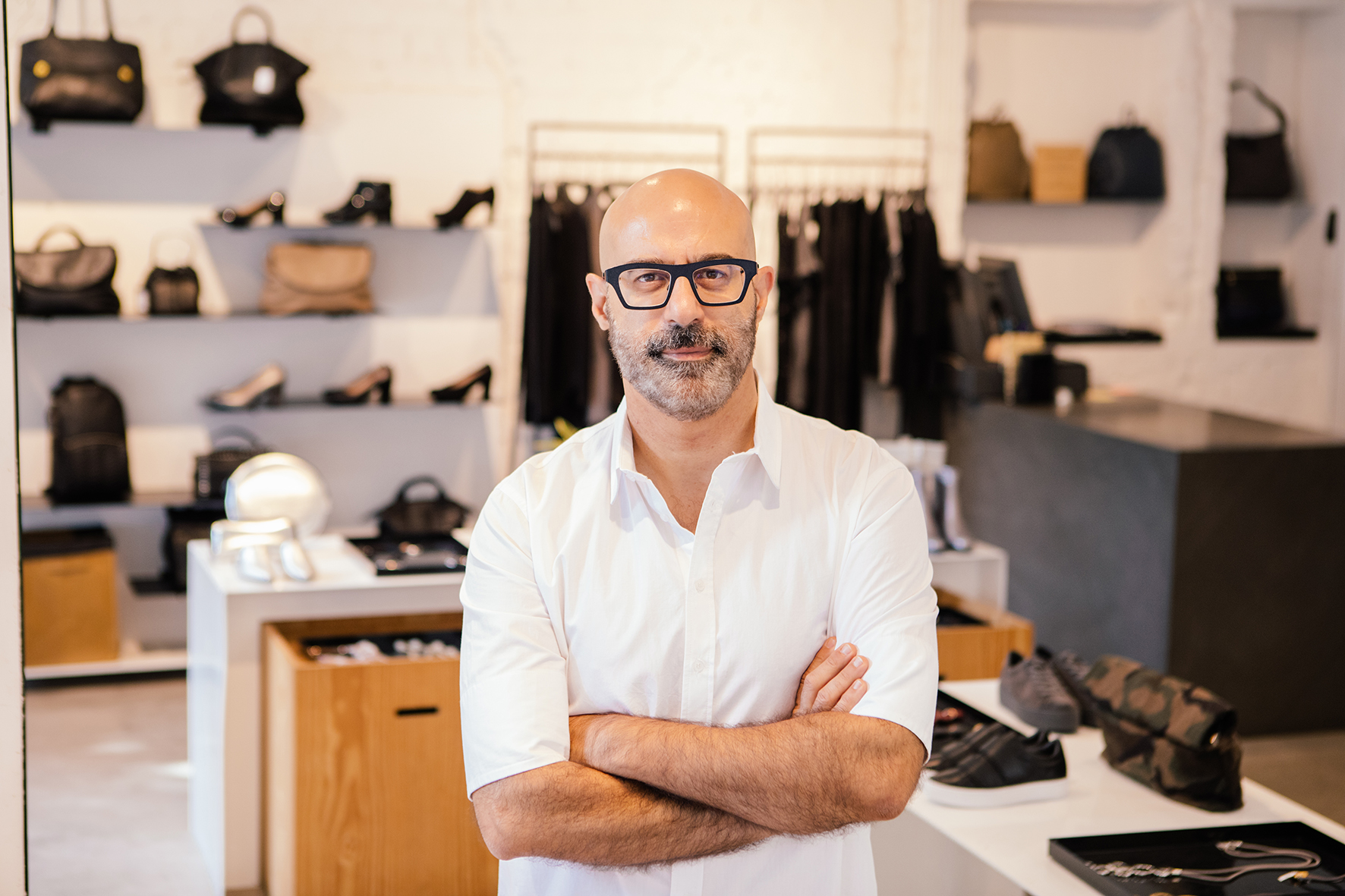
Image of Ronen Chen

Ronen Chen (Hebrew: רונן חן; born on 29 April 1965) is an Israeli fashion designer. According to Xnet, he is the most widely distributed and internationally known Israeli fashion designer.

== Biography ==
Ronen Chen was born in 1965 in Ramat Gan, a city east of Tel Aviv.

After graduating from high school and going through army service at a military prison, Ronen Chen entered the Shenkar College of Engineering and Design in 1986. Though he was previously inclined to become an architect, he opted to choose fashion design since the architecture school was a longer ride from his home. Later he realized that he actually enjoys fashion and prefers it to architecture.

By his third year in college, Chen was selling belts and shoes to Tel Aviv boutiques. During his fourth year, he was already making money by creating designer garments at affordable prices.

In 1990, right after graduation, he was hired by Gideon Oberson. In 1993, he founded his own "Ronen Chen" fashion brand, and opened his first small store and studio on the trendy Sheinkin Street in Tel Aviv.

In 1995, three more stores were opened in London in collaboration with a franchisee. Two years after, in 1997, these shops were closed following Chen's decision to focus on developing his business in Israel. He considers that the decision to open London stores at that time was reckless and naive, since his business wasn't prepared for that.

In the following years Chen developed a network of fashion stores in Israel and increased his international sales. In 2009, after 12 years since moving back to Israel, a new Ronen Chen store was opened in London's Portman Estate. Since 2010 he cooperates with Nordstrom on supplying his fashions to the United States.

As of August 2012, Ronen Chen had 18 brand stores in Israel and 2 in London. His fashions were also exported to the United States, Canada, Ireland, Netherlands and Belgium. His brand was presented with models such as Yael Goldman and Israeli model and actress Yana Goor (Hebrew: יאנה גור). Yael Goldman's work with Ronen Chen was featured on FashionTV in 2011–2013.

Chen and his girlfriend, a TV producer, share parenting responsibilities for their two daughters. He also designs dresses for the daughters.

== Style of work ==
Ronen Chen was never very interested in designing clothing for men. His clients are women of all ages and constitutions.

Ronen Chen's clothes are characterized by flattering fit and comfort, minimalism, universality, timelessness, leaning to monochrome and neutral colors, versatility in use, geometrical patterns and shapes.

== See also ==
- Israeli fashion
