= Tzomet Sfarim =

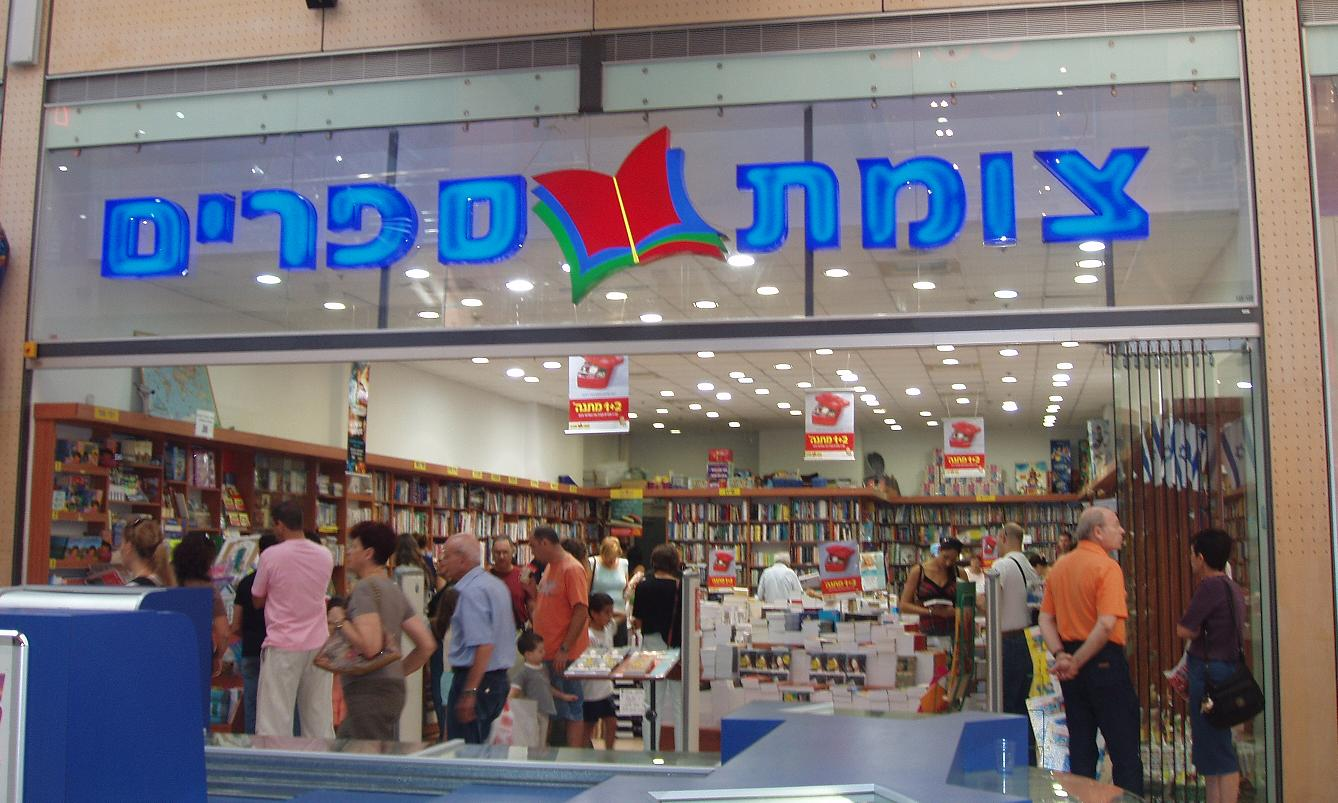
- Tzomet Sfarim store in a Herzliya mall
- Founded: 1981 – earliest parent 1996 – original Tz. Sf. 2002 – current Tz. Sf.
- Headquarters: Ramle, Israel
- Number of locations: 89 (23 July 2025)
- Area served: Israel
- Key people: Avi Schumer, CEO
- Website: booknet.co.il

Tzomet Sfarim (Hebrew: צומת ספרים, literally "book crossing") is the second largest bookstore chain in Israel, after its main national competitor Steimatzky.

== History ==
In 1981 Yerid Sfarim ("book fair") was founded. By 2002 it had 15 branches. In 1996 Tzomet Sfarim Ltd. was founded. It grew to 14 branches in 2002. In 2002 the companies united under one brand, Tzomet Sfarim, with Modan Publishing House as a third investor. Initially the chain operated about 40 stores. Avi Schumer, co-owner, was CEO from its foundation. By 2009 the chain had 80 stores.

By September 2017 the main competitor, Steimatzky reduced its number of branches to 140, while Tzomet Sfarim upped to 96 stores. The two companies control 80% of Israel's book market. According to Schumer, the chain is interested in operating 100 stores at most; after reaching this number he prefers to invest only in larger stores, coffee houses, and customer experience. As of October 2018 and April 2020, there were 95 stores in the Tzomet Sfarim chain. As of November 2021 there were 91 Tzomet Sfarim stores, compared to 130 Steimatzky stores, representing a decline for both chains. As of January 2022, Steimatzky had 128 stores and Tzomet Sfarim had 89. In July 2025, Tzomet Sfarim was still at 89 stores.
