= Steimatzky =

- Formerly: Steimatzky Middle East Agency
- Founded: first store, 1920 in Tel Aviv chain, 1925 in Jerusalem; Mandatory Palestine
- Founders: Tzvi Steimatzky (1920); Yechezkel Steimatzky (1925)
- Headquarters: Lev HaAretz, Kafr Qasim, Israel
- Number of locations: 136 (November 2020)
- Area served: Israel
- Owner: G. Yafit
- Website: steimatzky.co.il

Steimatzky (Hebrew: סטימצקי) is a bookstore chain in Israel. It is considered Israel's largest bookstore chain.

== History ==
=== 1920–25: Tzvi Steimatzky years ===
The first store was opened by Tzvi Steimatzky in 1920 in Tel Aviv, 6 Herzl St.

=== 1925–63: Yechezkel Steimatzky years ===
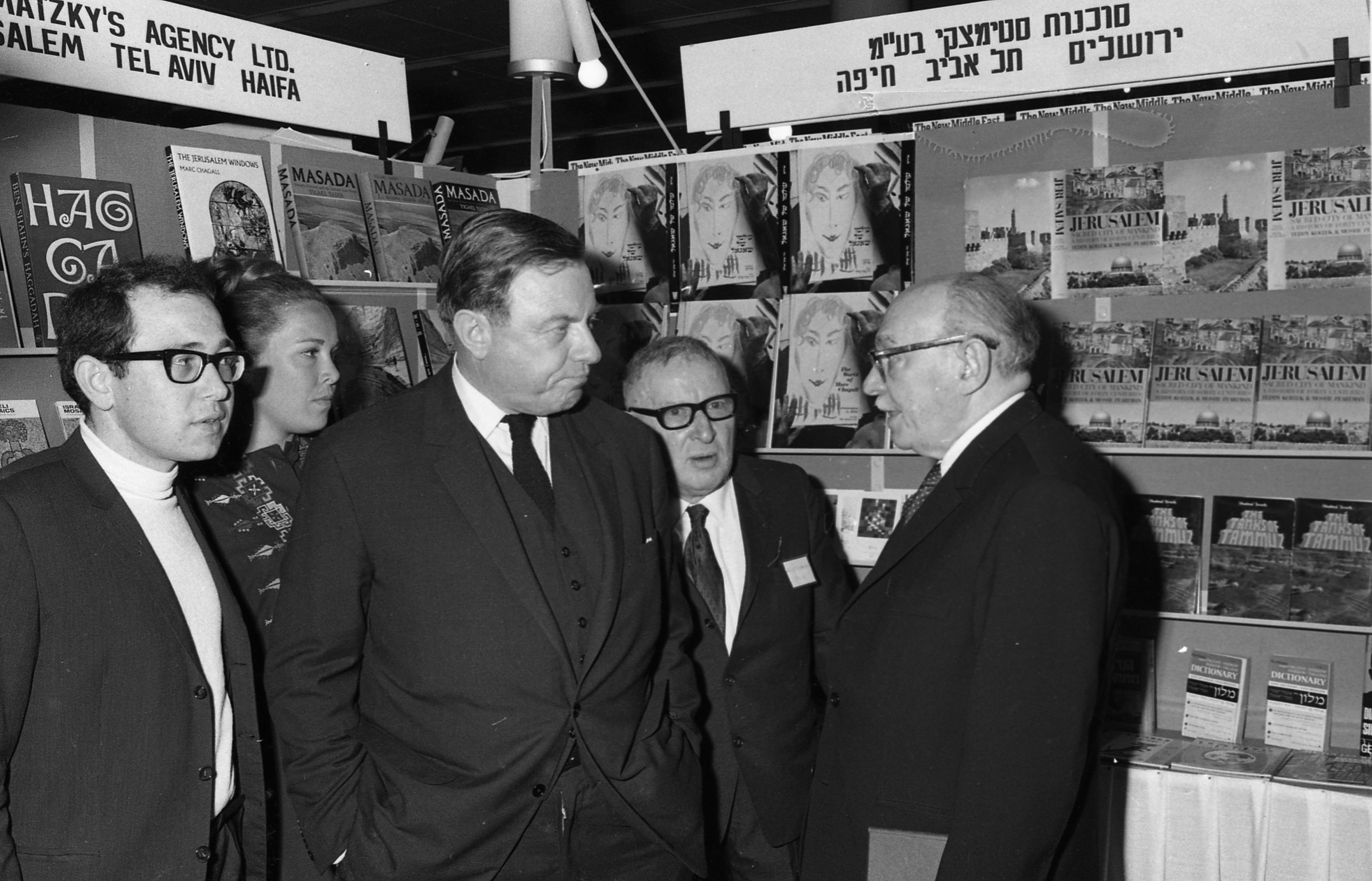
Teddy Kollek (center) visits the Steimatzky stand at the 1969 Jerusalem International Book Fair. Eri Steimatzky is on the right. Some books that Steimatzky published are on display.

In 1925 Tzvi's half brother Yechezkel Steimatzky opened the second store on Jaffa Road in Jerusalem. Yechezkel Steimatzky was a Russian-born immigrant from Germany. He had originally come to the British Mandate of Palestine on a short visit for the opening of the Hebrew University of Jerusalem and decided to stay after he saw the potential in opening a foreign language bookstore that would serve a growing immigrants' market as well as British Army soldiers serving under the British Mandate. The concept was so successful that he opened an additional store in Haifa later that year.

In 1927 Steimatzky saw the potential for expansion throughout the Middle East and opened a store in Beirut. The company name was changed to Steimatzky Middle East Agency. During World War II, a Steimatzky store opened in Baghdad next to the British Army base, and soon after in Cairo, Alexandria, and Damascus.

The Middle Eastern expansion came to a halt with the outbreak of the 1948 Arab–Israeli war and the nationalization of all branches in Beirut, Baghdad, Cairo and Damascus. By 1948 another store opened on Allenby Street in Tel Aviv.

=== 1963–2005: Eri Steimatzky years ===
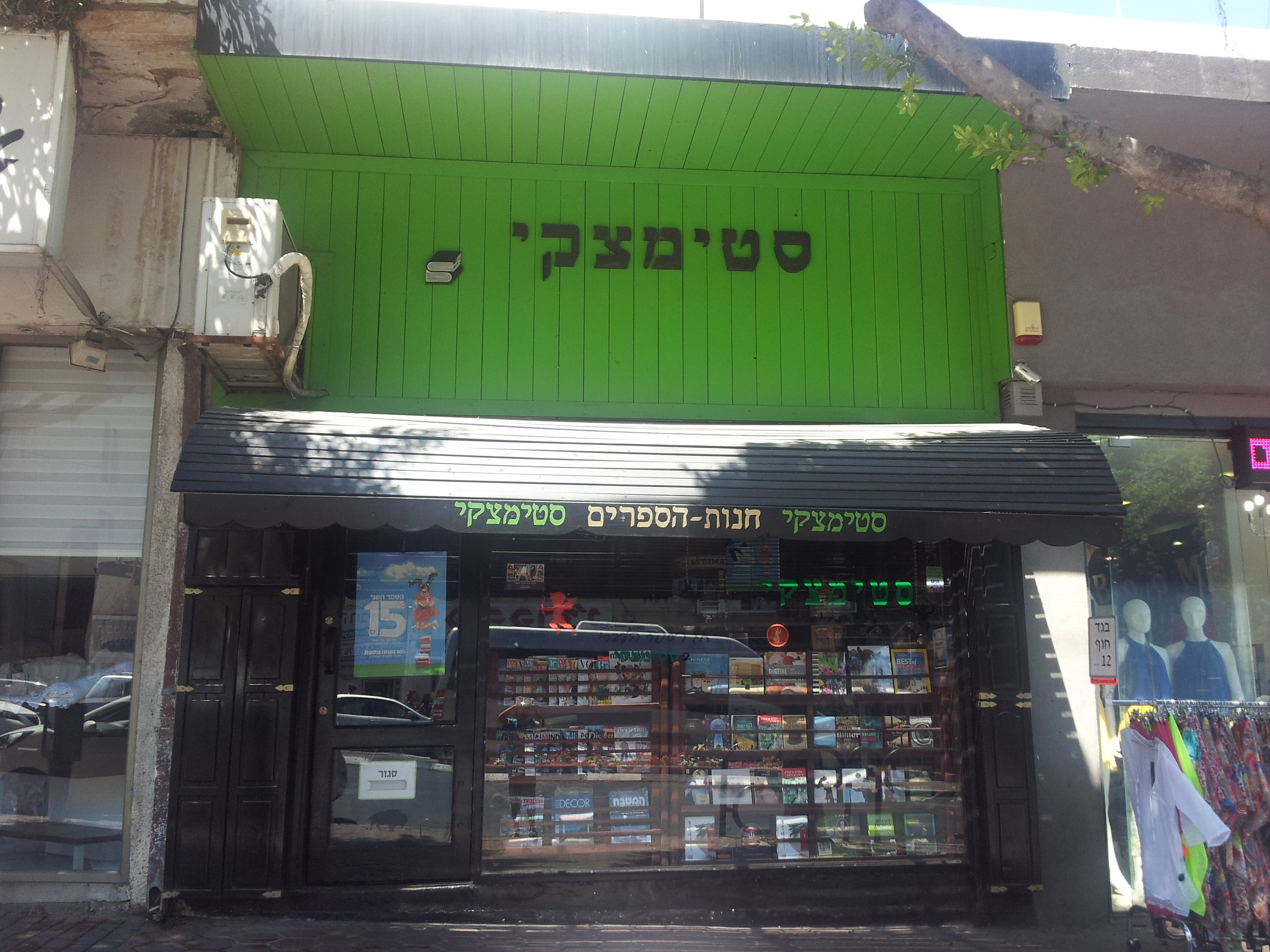
An old style Steimatzky store in Kfar Saba in 2014.

In 1963 the son of founder Yechezkel, Eri Steimatzky, joined the company and became its general manager. A period of expansion followed.

In 1995 the Steimatzky company purchased the Sifri chain with seven stores. The chain was a virtual monopoly in Israel until 2002.

In 2002 two smaller competitors (Tzomet Sfarim, Yerid Hasfarim) and Modan Publishing House united under the Tzomet Sfarim brand, operating about 40 stores. In 2004 Steimatzky merged with Keter Publishing House.

=== 2005–14: Markstone Capital years ===
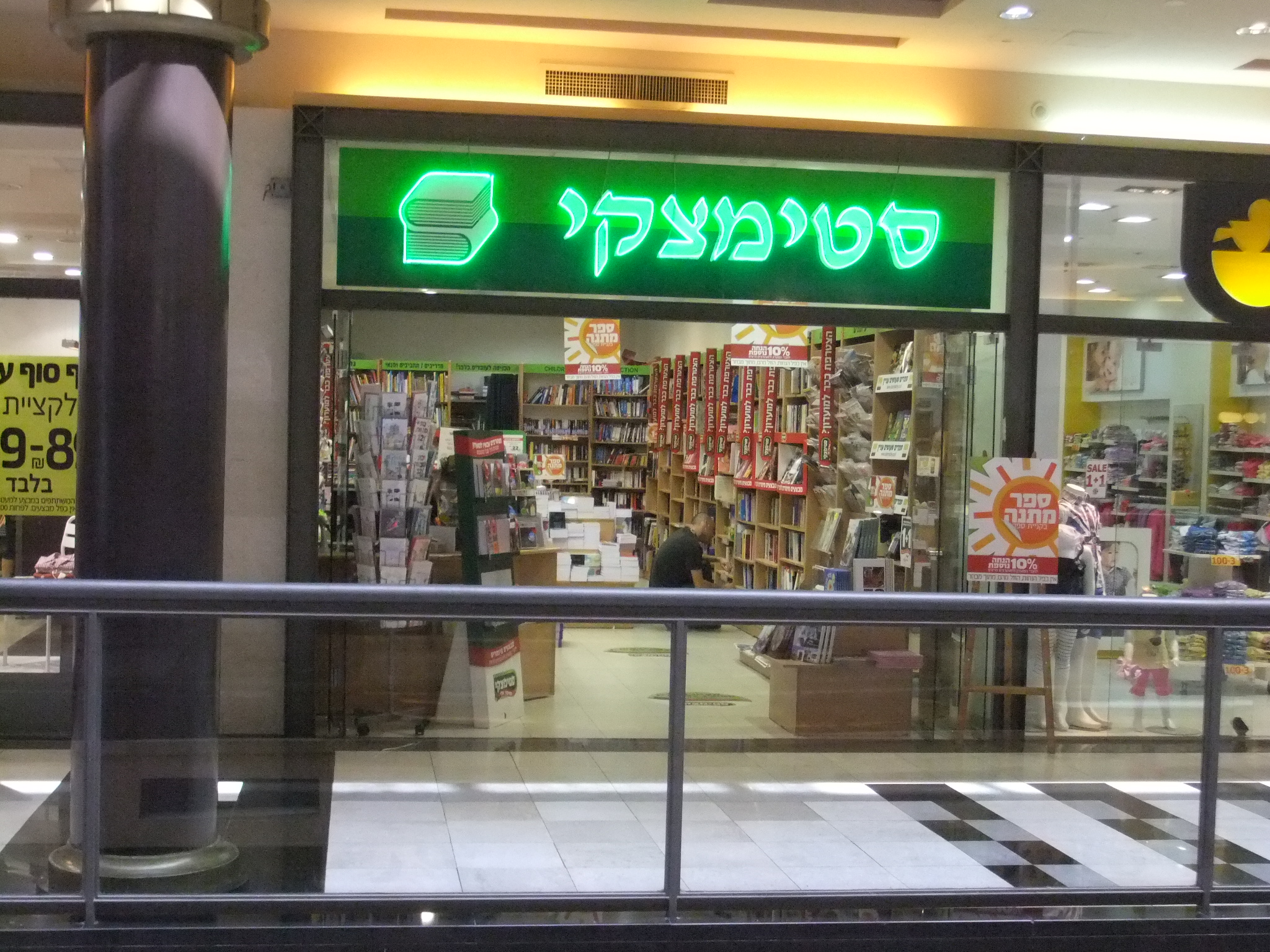
A Steimatzky store in the Pisgat Ze'ev Mall, Jerusalem, 2012.

In 2005 Markstone Capital Partners purchased the company. In 2006, Steimatzky operated stores in 68 cities in Israel as well as in London and Los Angeles. It was estimated that the company held a 40% share in the Israeli book retailing market and employed over 700 people worldwide. In September 2007, Eri Steimatzky announced his retirement from the chain, leaving the company in the hands of Markstone Capital.

In 2010 Steimatzky operated over 160 stores across Israel in various formats. These included mall-based stores, stores with coffee shops, extensive non-book offerings, and larger formats.

=== Since 2014: G. Yafit years ===
In June 2014 Steimatzky was acquired by a group of investors led by G. Yafit. Eyal Greenberg, the son of Yafit Greenberg ("G Yafit"), was appointed CEO.

By September 2017 the gap between Steimatzky and its main competitor, Tzomet Sfarim, was closing. Steimatzky reduced its number of branches to 140, Tzomet Sfarim upped to 96. On 1 October 2018 and 1 April 2020, Tzomet Sfarim had 95 branches. Steimatzky was unchanged on 1 October 2018 and down to 136 on 22 November 2020.

Early 2018, the headquarters and logistical center of Steimatzky moved from Kiryat Aryeh in Petach Tikva to the Lev HaAretz industrial area in Kafr Qasim. Since 2020, the website of Steimatzky sells a wide range of consumer products including shoes, perfumes, home appliances, and electronics. On 1 January 2022, Steimatzky has 128 branches. Tzomet Sfarim has 89. On 17 March 2023, Steimatzky has 138 branches. On 23 July 2025, it had 137.
