= Ben Yehuda Street bombings =

Ben Yehuda Street, Jerusalem bombings

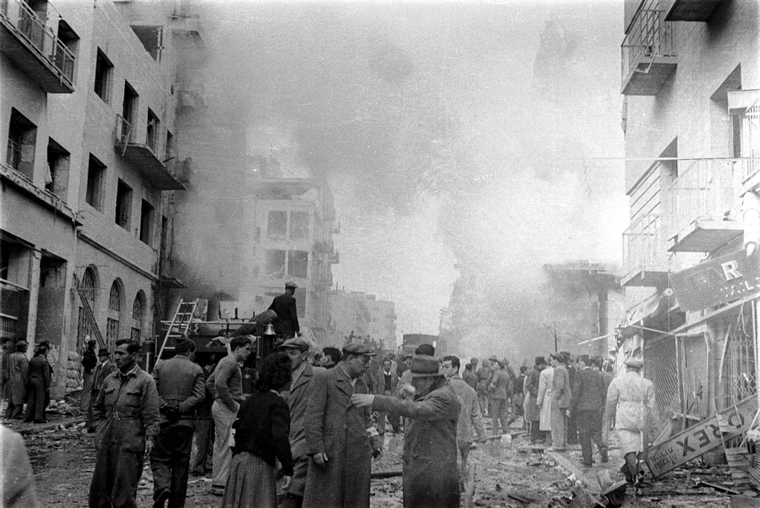
Car bomb explosion on Ben Yehuda Street, Jerusalem, February 22, 1948

Ben Yehuda Street, a central commercial thoroughfare in Jerusalem, has been the site of several significant Arab and Palestinian terrorist bombings spanning the 1947–1948 civil war in Mandatory Palestine through the Second Intifada. The first major and deadliest attack was on February 22, 1948, when a convoy of trucks packed with explosives detonated in the city center. Following the establishment of the State of Israel, the street became a recurring target, with major bombings occurring from 1975 to 2001, including the introduction of suicide bombers in 1997.

== 1948 bombing ==
1948 Ben Yehuda Street bombing
- Location: Ben Yehuda Street, Jerusalem
- Date: 1948
- Target: Pedestrian shopping mall
- Attack type: car bombs
- Deaths: 58
- Injuries: 123

The attacks took place during the 1947–1948 civil war in Mandatory Palestine, after the United Nations Partition Plan for Palestine in November 1947 and before the Israeli Declaration of Independence in May 1948.

On February 22, 1948, three British Army trucks led by an armoured car driven by Arab irregulars and British deserters exploded on Ben Yehuda Street killing from 49 to 58 civilians and injuring from 140 to 200. The bomb may have been intended to kill members of the Furmans (Palmach convoy escorts) who lodged in the Atlantic and Amdursky Hotels but had left on patrol shortly beforehand. In addition to the two hotels, the Vilenchick Building and the Kupat-Milveh Bank were destroyed. The bomb had been created by Fawzi al-Qutb. The convoy was led by a Jerusalemite militant, 'Azmi al-Ja'uni, who spoke fluent English and could pass himself off as a British officer. Two British deserters, Eddie Brown, a police captain who claimed that the Irgun had killed his brother, and Peter Madison, an army corporal, had been persuaded to join the attack, also by the promise of substantial financial rewards.

=== Aftermath ===
The following evening a leaflet was distributed stating that the explosion was in response to an Irgun bomb attack three days earlier, in Ramla market, in which 6 were killed and 32 wounded.. It was signed by Abd al-Qadir, who assumed responsibility for the operation. Abd al-Qadir himself, in Cairo the day after, left a statement to Al-Ahram to the same effect and the Army of the Holy War High Command reiterated the declaration in Palestine. Husayn al-Khalidi, secretary of the Arab Higher Committee, deplored the act as 'depravity unfit for the Arab spirit,' while the Committee itself, in an attempt to distance itself from the incident, tried to throw doubt on the authenticity of Abd al-Qadir's public statements.

In the ensuing confusion, Jewish residents immediately blamed the British for the attack. David Ben-Gurion, on visiting the site of the carnage, has been cited as putting some responsibility for this Arab attack on the shoulders of Jewish thugs, stating, "I could not forget that our thugs and murderers had opened the way." The Irgun spread word ordering militants to shoot on sight any Englishman. By day's end, eight British soldiers had been shot dead, while a ninth was murdered while laid up in a Jewish clinic for treatment of a wound. Lehi also reacted several days later by blowing up a train full of British soldiers as it drew out of Rehovot station, killing 27.

The day after, on 23 February, a Jewish offensive, deploying mortars, was launched against the Arab neighbourhood of Musrara, in Jerusalem, killing seven Arabs, including an entire family. The Arabs believed it was in revenge for the Ben-Yehuda Street bombing, though, according to Israeli historian Itamar Radai, at the time the Jews and their official institutions blamed only the British for the incident.

== 1975 bombing ==
1975 Ben Yehuda Street Bombing
- Location: Zion Square, leading onto Ben Yehuda Street, Jerusalem
- Date: 4 July 1975
- Target: Pedestrian shopping mall
- Attack type: time bomb
- Deaths: 15
- Injuries: 60
- Perpetrators: Ahmed Jabara, aka Abu Sukar

On Friday, 4 July 1975, a refrigerator that had five kilograms of explosives packed into its sides exploded on Zion Square, a main city square connecting Ben Yehuda Street and Jaffa Road. Fifteen people were killed and 77 injured in the attack. Ahmad Jabara, who was responsible for placing the bomb, was arrested and sentenced to life and thirty years in prison, but was released by Israel in 2003 after serving 27 years as a gesture to Arafat, who then appointed him his adviser on prisoners affairs. He died in Ramallah in 2013.

On November 13, 1975, an explosive charge went off near Cafe Naveh on Jaffa Road, near the pedestrian mall. Six people were killed and 40 injured.

== 1976 bombing ==
1976 Ben Yehuda Street bombing
- Location: Ben Yehuda Street, Jerusalem
- Date: 3 May 1976
- Target: Pedestrian shopping mall
- Attack type: Bombing
- Deaths: 1
- Injuries: 33
- Perpetrator: DFLP

On 9 April 1976, a car bomb was dismantled on Ben Yehuda Street shortly before it was to have exploded.

On 3 May 1976, thirty-three passers-by were injured when a booby-trapped motor scooter exploded at the corner of Ben Yehuda and Ben Hillel Streets. Among those injured were the Greek consul in Jerusalem and his wife. The following day, on the eve of Independence Day, the municipality organized an event at the site of the attack, under the slogan "Nevertheless." One person is also reported to have died in the attack which was perpetrated by the Democratic Front for the Liberation of Palestine (DFLP).

== 1997 bombing ==
1997 Ben Yehuda Street Bombing
- Location: Ben Yehuda Street, Jerusalem
- Date: 4 September 1997
- Target: Pedestrian shopping mall
- Attack type: suicide bombers
- Deaths: 5 (+3 suicide bombers)
- Perpetrator: Hamas

On 4 September 1997, three Hamas suicide bombers simultaneously blew themselves up on the pedestrian mall, killing five Israelis. The bombing was carried out by Palestinians from the village of Asira al-Shamaliya.

Three 14-year-old girls were killed in the attack: Sivann Zarka, Yael Botvin and Smadar Elhanan. Elhanan was the daughter of peace activist Nurit Peled-Elhanan and the granddaughter of Israeli general and politician Mattityahu Peled.

The family of Yael Botvin, a U.S. citizen, filed a lawsuit in the United States against the Islamic Republic of Iran.

A default judgment of $251 million in compensatory and punitive damages was awarded to the relatives of Americans killed in the attack. There were few assets of the Iranian government in the United States following the judgment. The plaintiffs threatened to seize valuable Persian artifacts located in Chicago museums and sell them for proceeds, leading to the Chicago's Persian heritage crisis, as well as suing the account of the Bank Melli Iran in the Bank of New York, but having the United States Department of Justice speak as amicus curiae in support of Bank Melli, advising that the bank had no responsibility for turning the funds over, resulted in a ruling against the students.

== 2001 bombing ==
2001 Ben Yehuda Street Bombings
- Part of Second Intifada
- Location: Ben Yehuda Street, Jerusalem
- Date: 1 December 2001
- Target: Pedestrian shopping mall, responding paramedics
- Attack type: suicide bombers and a car bomb
- Deaths: 11 (+2 suicide bombers)
- Injuries: 180
- Perpetrator: Hamas

On 1 December 2001, two suicide bombers detonated themselves on Ben Yehuda Street, followed by a car bomb set to go off as paramedics arrived. The suicide bombers killed eleven victims aged 15 to 21, including a number of soldiers out of uniform, and 188 were injured. Hamas claimed responsibility, stating that it was in retaliation for the killing of senior Hamas militant Mahmud Abu Hanoud. A Hamas spokesman in Gaza stated that these bombings did not assuage its lust for vengeance and that it would carry out further bombings. Lawsuits were filed against Arab Bank, NatWest and Crédit Lyonnais alleging that they channelled money to Hamas.
