= Zion Square ice cream shop bombing =

1975 incident in Jerusalem

- Part of the Israeli–Palestinian conflict
- Native name: הפיגוע בגלידריה בכיכר ציון
- Location: 31.781943°N 35.219358°E; Zion Square, Jaffa Road, Jerusalem
- Date: 13 November 1975; 50 years ago c. 7:00 pm
- Weapon: Explosive device
- Deaths: 7 civilians
- Injuries: 42 civilians
- Perpetrators: DFLP and Fatah claimed responsibility

On 13 November 1975, a bomb exploded outside an ice-cream parlor in Jerusalem.

The bomb had been placed in a baggage cart by Arab militants and exploded outside an ice cream shop in Zion Square on Jaffa Road at around 7:00 pm. Many storefronts were damaged. Six teenagers were killed that night, and another died the next day. Including three boys and three girls. 42 people were injured, including two tourists from the United States and Netherlands, all of which were treated at the Shaare Zedek Medical Center.

Two Lebanon-based Palestinian groups, Fatah and the Democratic Front for the Liberation of Palestine claimed responsibility for the attack, which happened three days after United Nations General Assembly Resolution 3379 was passed, and on the anniversary of Yasser Arafat's speech to the United Nations. According to historian Richard J. Chasdi the attack was perpetrated by Fatah and was intentionally meant to coincide with the speech's anniversary. Wafa described the bombing as "a heroic and daring operation" which had caused "[a] large number of casualties among the settlers... according to preliminary estimates 20 were killed and 50 wounded, most seriously."

== See also ==
- Zion Square refrigerator bombing – which occurred on 4 July 1975.
