= Downtown Triangle (Jerusalem) =

Central district in Jerusalem

Coordinates: 31°46′55.80″N 35°13′04.30″E

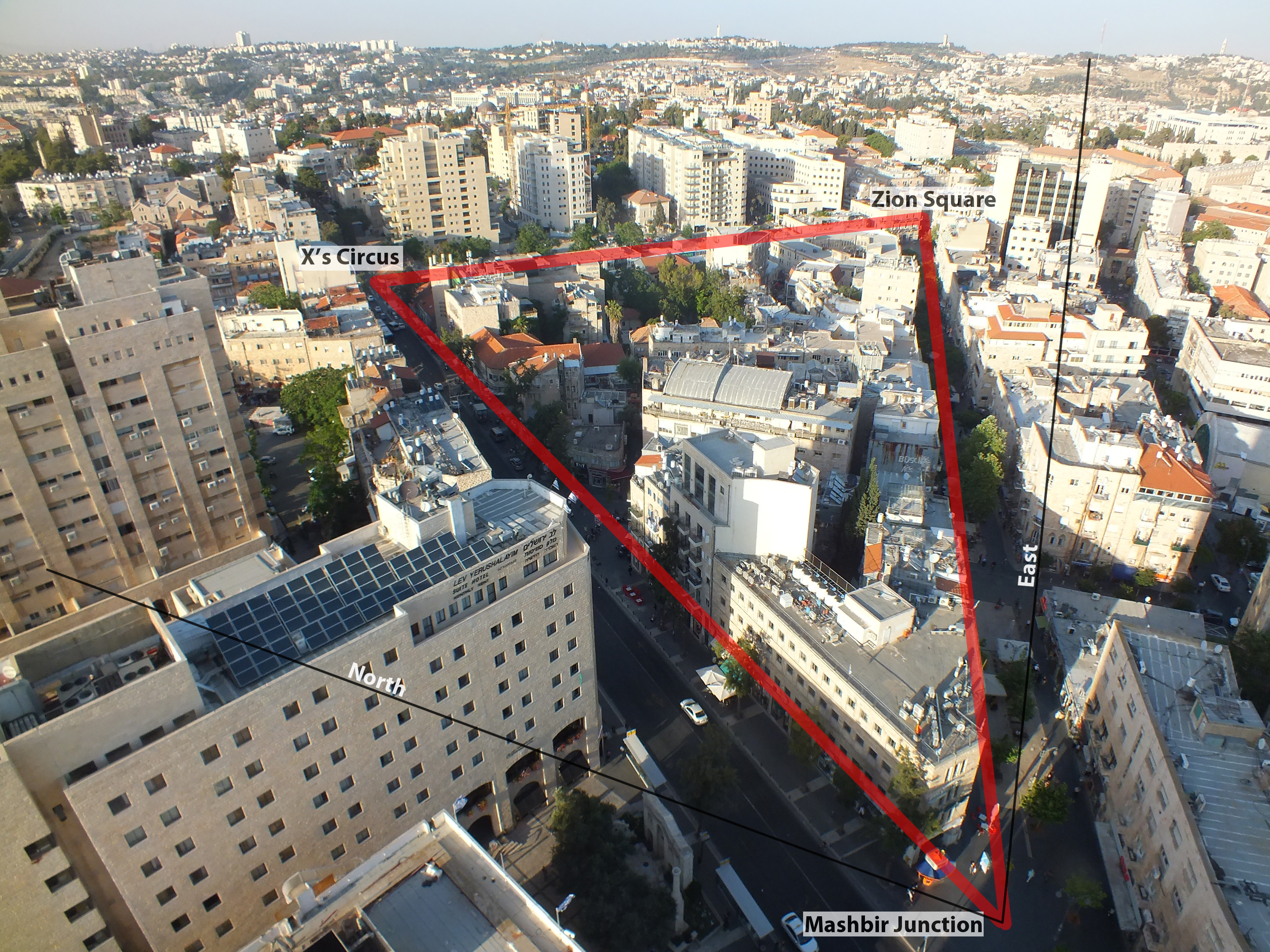
Aerial view of Jerusalem's Downtown Triangle.

The Downtown Triangle (Hebrew: המשולש, Ha-Meshulash, lit. "The Triangle"; Arabic: مثلث وسط المدينة) is a commercial and entertainment district in central Jerusalem. Measuring 29,000 square metres (310,000 sq ft), the area is bounded by Jaffa Road on the north, King George Street on the west, and Ben Yehuda Street on the southeast. Its vertices are the intersections of Jaffa Road and King George Street, King George and Ben Yehuda Streets, and Ben Yehuda Street and Jaffa Road (the latter known as Zion Square).

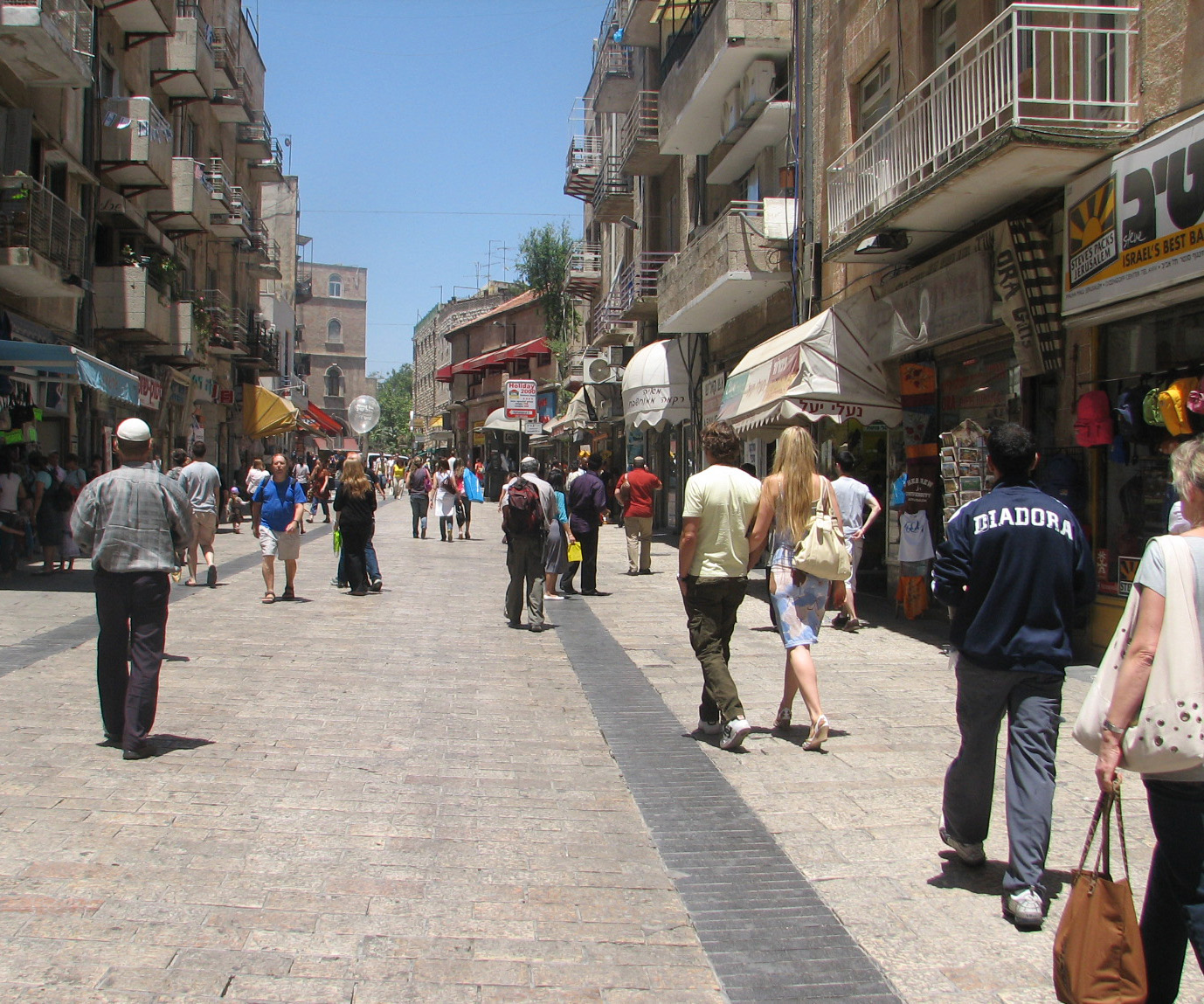
Ben Hillel Street

From the mid-1940s through the 1960s, the Triangle was the commercial and cultural heart of Jerusalem, with many upscale shops and restaurants operated by German-Jewish immigrant businessmen that appealed to an affluent clientele. Following the reunification of Jerusalem in 1967 and the expansion of the city away from the downtown core, the commercial viability of the Triangle declined. The area was revitalized by the conversion of Ben Yehuda Street and the interior streets of the Triangle to an open-air pedestrian mall in 1982. Over the next two decades, outdoor cafes and souvenir shops moved in, cementing the reputation of the Triangle as a popular shopping and entertainment venue for tourists and young Israelis.

== History ==
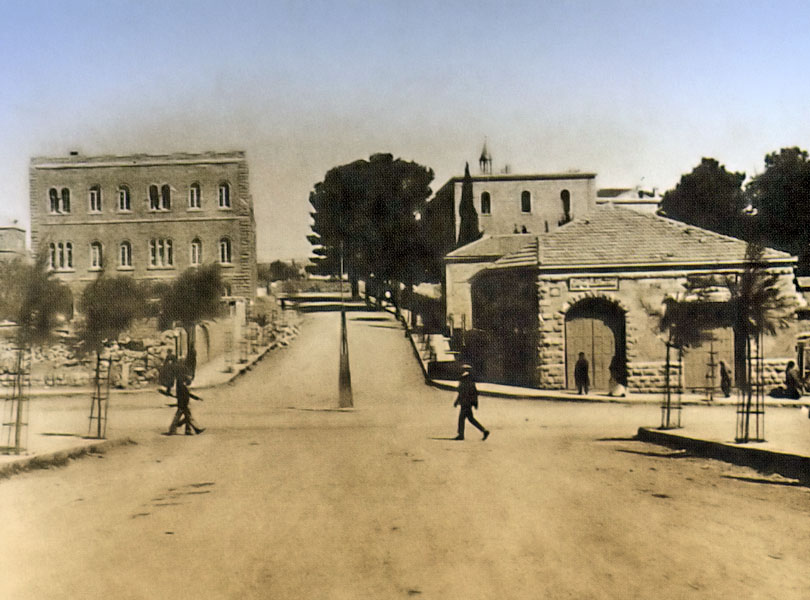
Intersection of King George Street (foreground), Straus Street (background), and Jaffa Road (right and left), 1924.

Before the British Mandatory government took over in 1917, the main commercial district in Jerusalem was in the Old City. With an eye to the continuing development of new neighborhoods outside the Old City Walls, the British drew up a master town plan that called for the establishment of two commercial hubs in the New City. The first commercial district to be built was the Downtown Triangle, although it was intended to play a secondary role to the other planned commercial district in the Mamilla area, which was closer to the Old City. However, the Mamilla development did not garner as much interest as the Triangle.

The land used for the Downtown Triangle had been purchased by the Jewish Colonization Association from the Greek Orthodox Patriarchate, which began selling off some of its holdings in Jerusalem after World War I. The British developed the field into a triangular district (hence its appellation, "The Triangle") demarcated by Jaffa Road, Ben Yehuda Street (constructed by the British in 1922) and King George Street (constructed by the British in 1924). Lots were sold to large companies and cooperatives as well as private businesses. Other streets adjacent to the Triangle – Shlomzion Hamalka, Mamilla, Agron, and King David Streets – were zoned for commercial and residential use.

=== European ambience ===
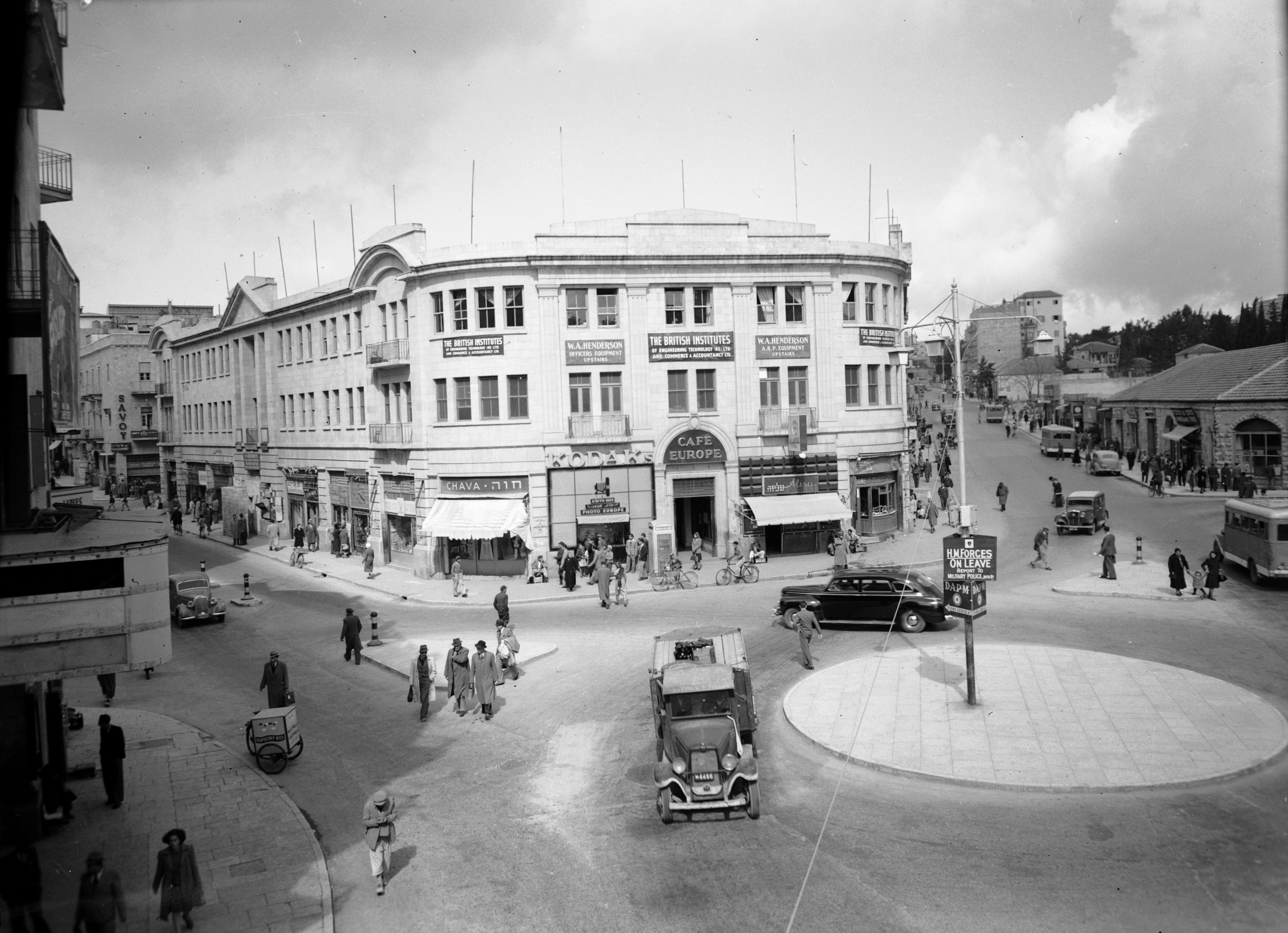
Cafe Europe, located in the Sansur Building at Zion Square, circa 1934–1946.

According to Jerusalem architectural historian David Kroyanker, the heyday of the Downtown Triangle lasted from the early 1930s to the 1970s. Many stores and restaurants were opened by German Jewish immigrants who sought to recreate a European ambience in the city center. Their upscale boutiques, coffeehouses, delicatessens, and exclusive restaurants were frequented by senior Mandate officials and wealthy, English-speaking tourists. Unlike Israeli stores that sold all kinds of unrelated products under one roof, the Europeans introduced boutiques that featured only one item, such as gloves or ties. Some shops offered unique extras, such as coffeehouses that included an orchestra and dance floor, and a bookstore with a second-floor library.

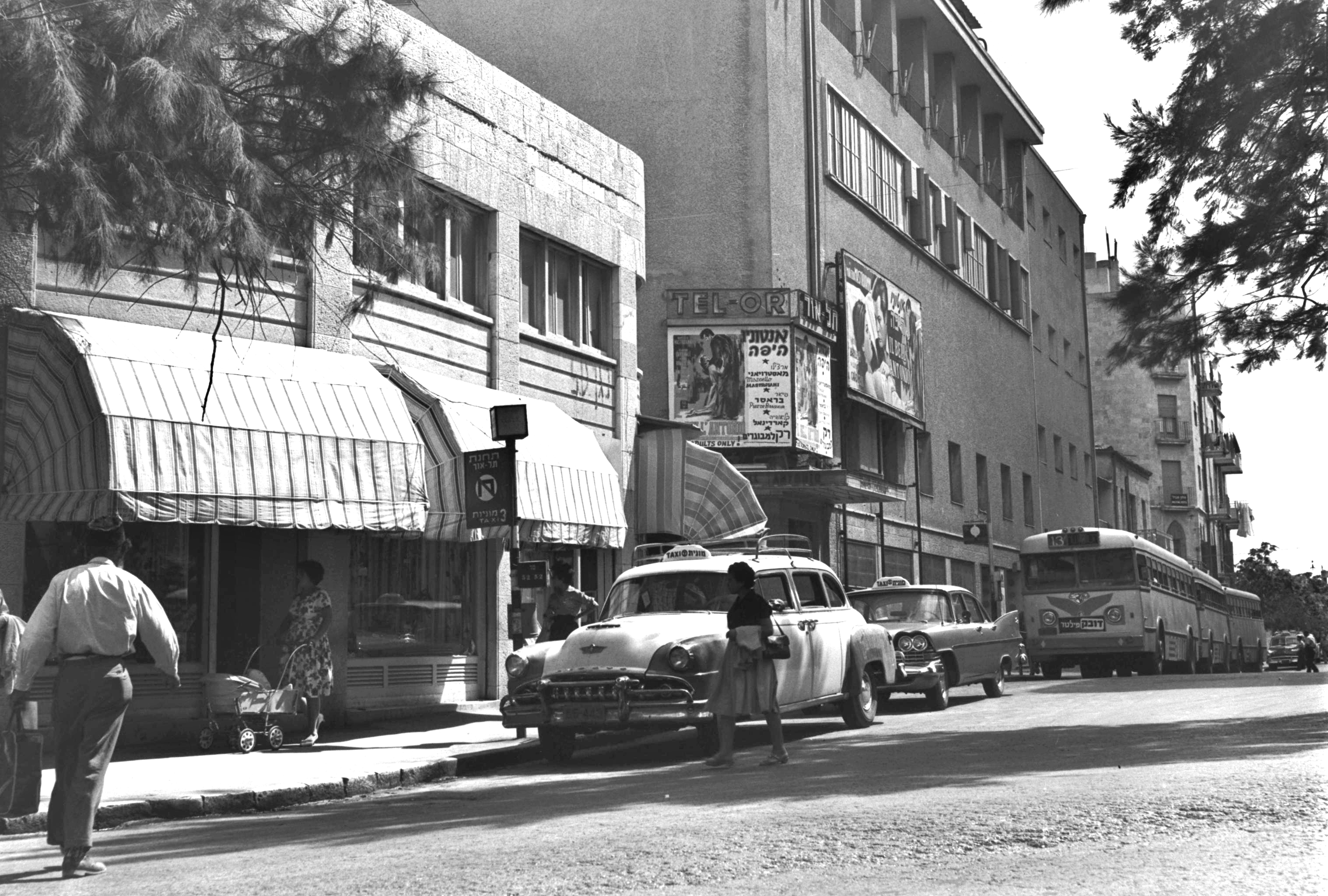
Hahistadrut Street in 1960

The European immigrant-owned bookstores fueled the demand for detective fiction, historical reading, and periodicals from Germany and England. Steimatzky, which opened its first bookstore on Jaffa Road in the Triangle in 1925, identified the growing taste for imported newspapers and magazines and bought the franchises for many of them. The European immigrants also created a market for cold cuts and cheeses, with three competing delicatessens on King George and Ben Yehuda Streets. For many years, the Triangle was also the only place where Jerusalem residents could purchase clothing, shoes, furniture, and household goods.

At its peak, the district was home to 14 cinemas screening the newest Hollywood fare. Located in close proximity to one another, the cinemas would attract both adults and youth, who would afterwards patronize the coffeehouses and restaurants. The Downtown Triangle was the cultural heart of the city and the place "to see and be seen".

=== Architecture ===
The cosmopolitan flavor of the Triangle extended to its buildings. The Sansur building, for example, has an "eclectic" design that combines "neo-Renaissance and classicist elements". Approximately 15 buildings in the Triangle were designed by architect Reuven Avraham Rabinowitz, who often added a row of roughly dressed stone to the facade to demarcate each story.

== Decline and rebirth ==
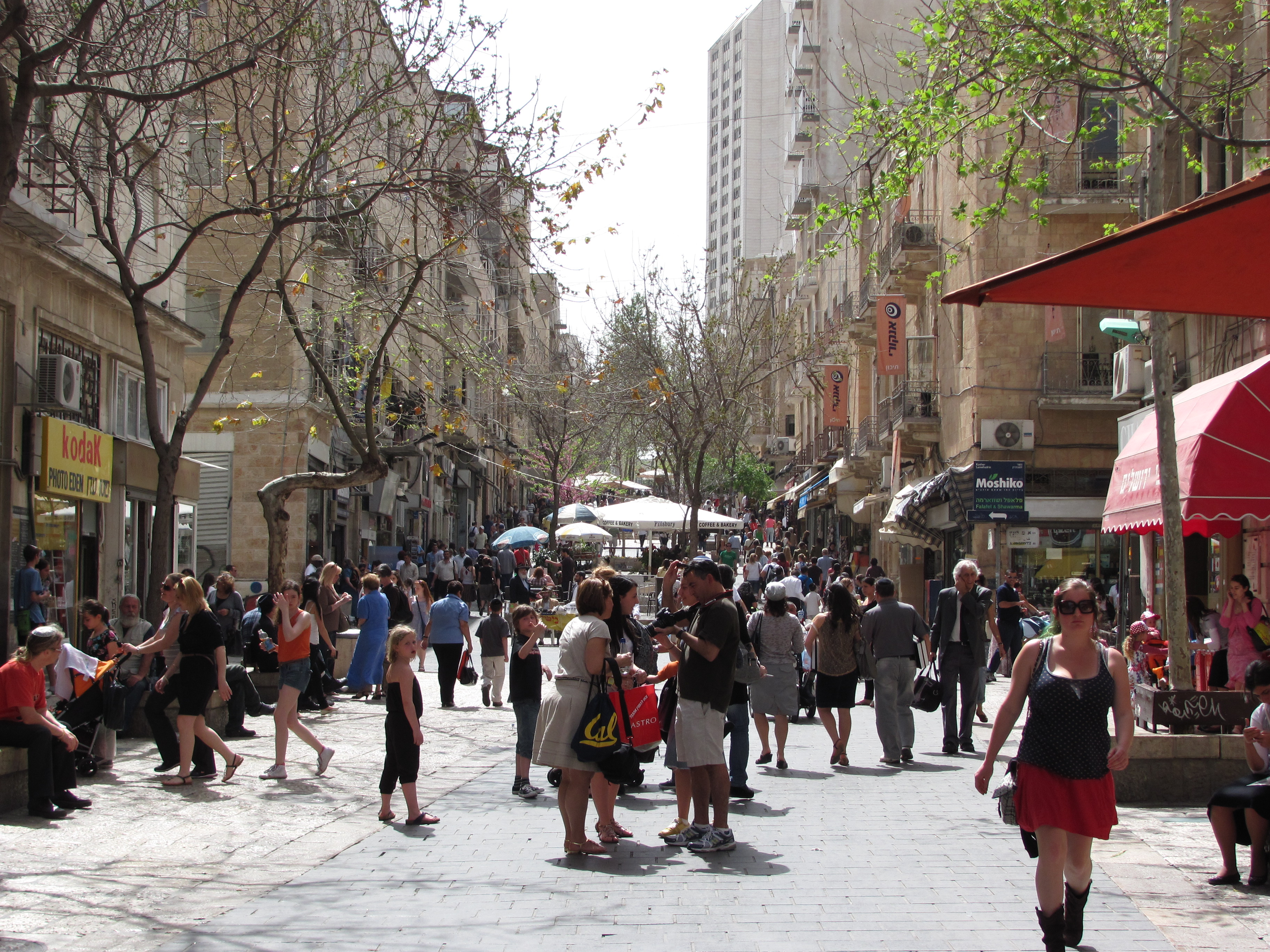
Ben Yehuda Street pedestrian mall

Following the reunification of Jerusalem in 1967, the city embarked on significant expansion. Large commercial centers were opened in the new, outlying neighborhoods of Talpiot, Givat Shaul, and Malha, drawing customers away from the city center. Government offices began moving out as well, precipitating the economic decline of the Downtown Triangle in the 1970s. The clientele of the upscale European boutiques had also aged, and the neighborhoods adjacent to downtown became occupied by poor and Haredi Jews who did not patronize the Triangle. The elegant shops gave way to hummus restaurants, dollar stores, and money changers. The advent of television precipitated the closure of most of the Triangle's cinemas.

The downtown triangle of streets is seething with Jews—
Loud, chattering geniuses, drivers, merchants, and kids,
Pharmacists from Germany, scholars,
Kibbutzniks on a spree, saints,
Men shaking in yarmulkas over a Coke,
The round and the blind, the muscle-bulging
Of our people, foaming beggars,
And open-shirted name-brand macho Sabra men.

— Danny Siegel

In 1982, the city attempted to revitalize the downtown district by closing Ben Yehuda Street and the Triangle's interior streets (Luncz, Dorot Rishonim, Yavetz, Ben Hillel, and HaHistadrut Streets) to traffic, and converting the entire area to an open-air pedestrian mall. Though taxi companies demonstrated against the renovation and merchants claimed it would fail, the idea proved successful. Outdoor cafes, pizzerias, and fast-food restaurants moved into the Triangle, together with shops selling souvenirs, Judaica, and jewelry to tourists. Street musicians, street artists, political promoters, and tables manned by Chabad and Breslov Hasidim add to the lively nature of the mall. The pedestrian mall restored the Triangle's reputation as the "heart" of the city, although the formerly upscale, European tone was replaced by a more populist image. The introduction of the Jerusalem Light Rail in December 2011 further increased local and visitor traffic: estimates show that 36,000 pedestrians per day visited the Triangle in April 2012, up from 16,000 per day in April 2004. The mall is especially busy on Saturday nights, as eateries that have closed for Shabbat reopen and the streets are crowded with young Israelis from Jerusalem and Tel Aviv.

Beginning in the late 1990s, the pedestrian mall became noted for hosting a growing presence of at-risk and homeless youth. Three youth centers – Hameshulash, Hezroni's Squat, and The Zone – operate in the vicinity of Zion Square.

=== Bombing attacks ===
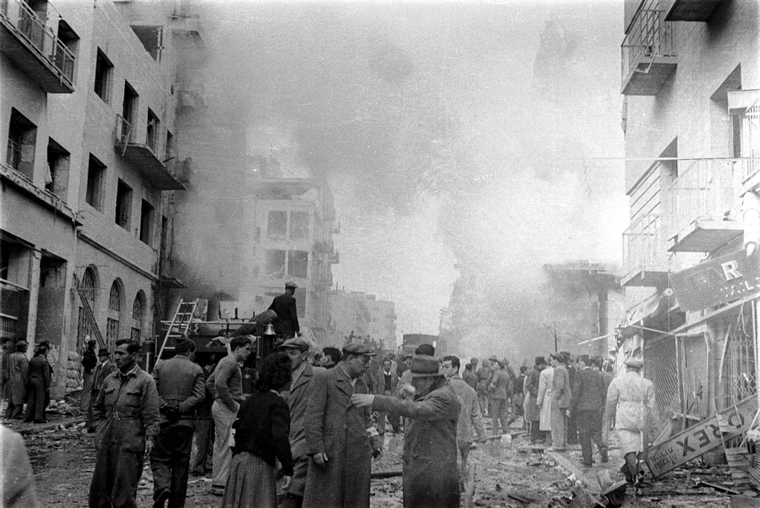
Car bombs explode on Ben Yehuda Street, 22 February 1948

Due to its centrality and large concentration of visitors and entertainment venues, the Downtown Triangle has been the target of numerous bombing attacks and attempted attacks. On 22 February 1948, three British Army trucks led by an armored car driven by Arab irregulars and British deserters exploded on Ben Yehuda Street, killing 58 Jewish civilians and injuring 140. On 4 July 1975, a refrigerator containing 5 kilograms (11 lb) of explosives detonated in Zion Square, killing 15 and wounding 77. On 24 March 1979, a bomb exploded in a trash can in Zion Square, killing one and wounding 13.

During the suicide bomber era in the late 1990s, three suicide bombers stationed at different points on Ben Yehuda Street exploded themselves almost simultaneously, causing eight deaths and 277 injuries. A similar "relay" bombing attack took place on 1 December 2001: Police and emergency medical personnel were rushing to the scene of a double suicide bombing attack in the Triangle when a car bomb exploded; 20 died and 150 were wounded. Earlier, in August, a Sbarro restaurant at the corner of Jaffa Road and King George Street, packed with lunchtime customers, was bombed; 15 people died and 90 were wounded.

In February 2014, in response to lobbying by terror victims groups, the Jerusalem municipality held a ceremony and mounted a memorial plaque at the site of the 1948 bombing on Ben Yehuda Street.

== Landmarks ==
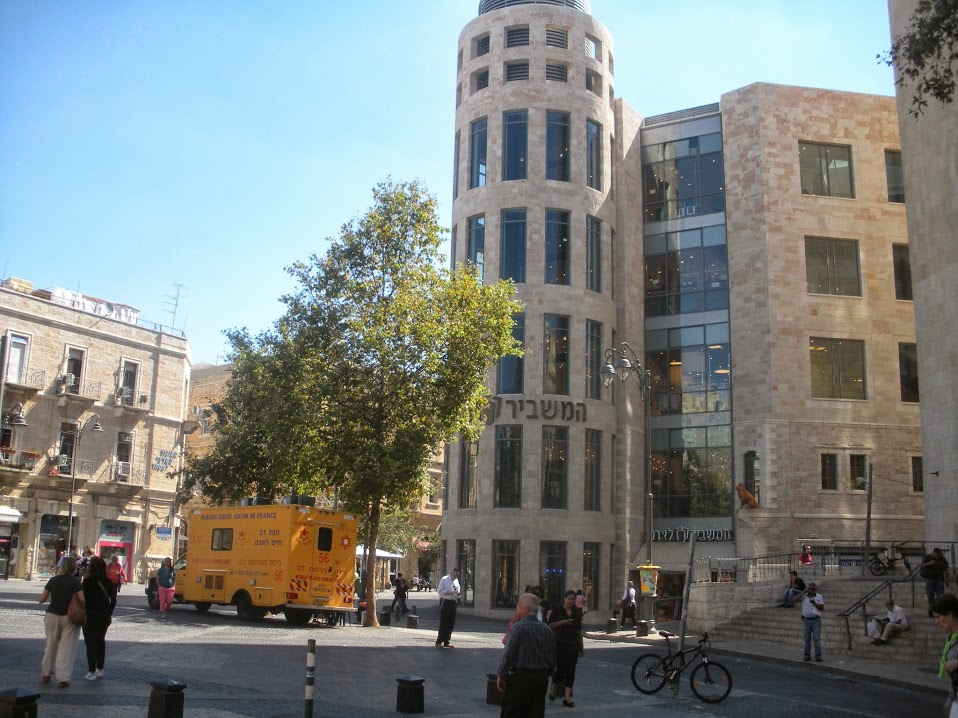
Hamashbir Lazarchan department store at Zion Square.

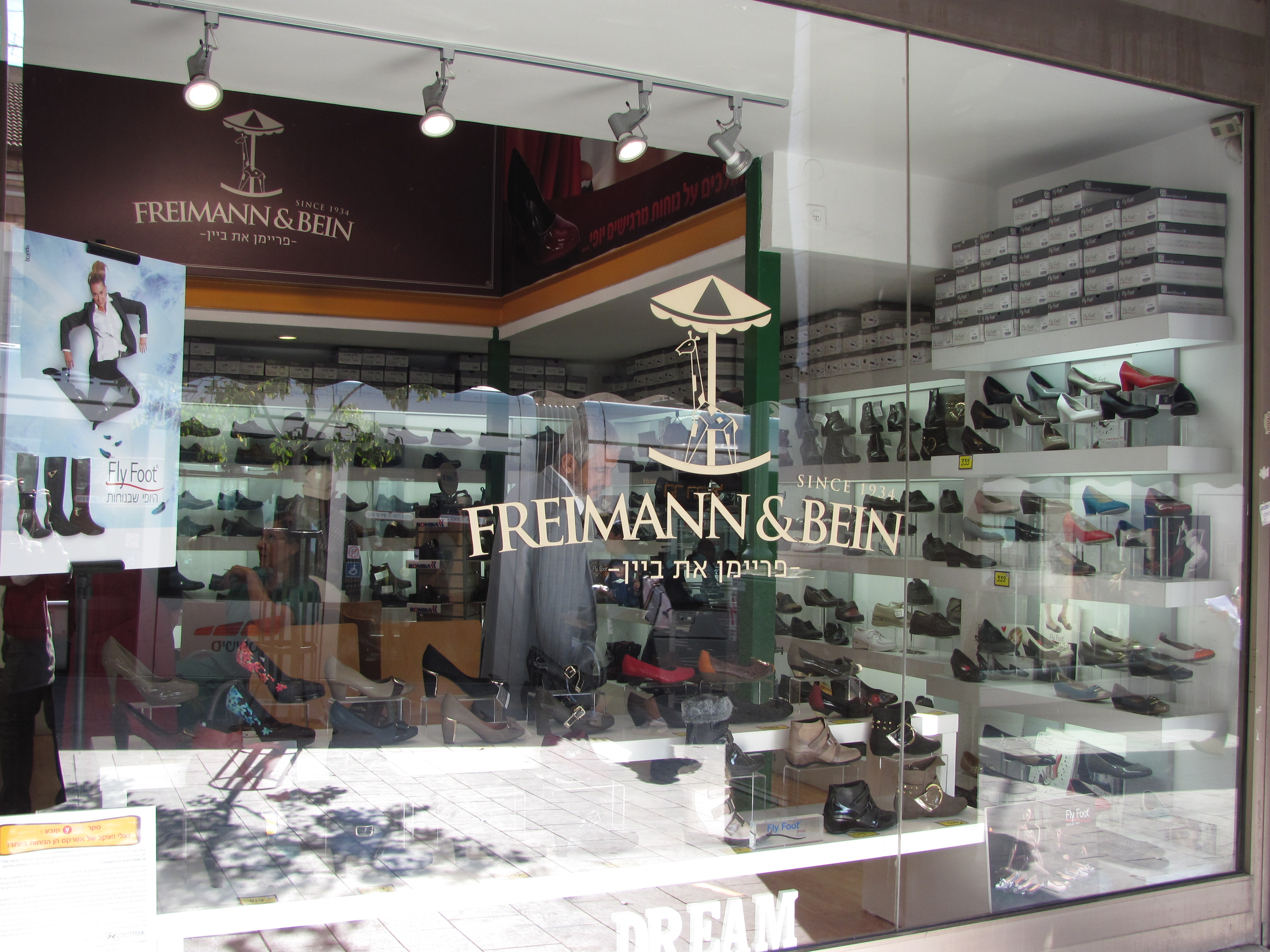
Freimann & Bein shoe store on Jaffa Road

The tallest building in the Triangle is the seven-story, 5,000 square metres (54,000 sq ft) Hamashbir Lazarchan department store, which opened on the eastern side of Zion Square in 2011. It is the largest department store in Israel and the flagship store of the 38-store chain. Hamashbir is intimately associated with the Downtown Triangle, as the first Hamashbir store was established across the street from its current location in 1947, and moved to another vertex of the Triangle, at King George and Ben Yehuda Streets, from 1970 to 2010.

Freimann and Bein (50 Jaffa Road) was the first luxury shoe store in Israel. Founded by German-Jewish immigrants, it imported quality leather shoes from Europe and attracted a clientele of British officers and Arab sheikhs. The store originally opened in the Generali Building further east on Jaffa Road in 1935 and moved to 50 Jaffa Road in 1947. It closed in 2014. Khalifa Shoes (44 Jaffa Road), founded in 1954, is a Jewish family-owned business specializing in Israeli-made shoes and sandals.

The longest-lasting dining establishments in the Triangle were Atara Cafe and Fink's Bar. Atara Cafe operated at 7 Ben Yehuda Street from 1938 to 1996. The European-style coffeehouse was a favorite of Mandate officers, pre-state paramilitary groups, and Israeli politicians, journalists, and bohemians. Fink's Bar, at the corner of King George and HaHistadrut Streets, was open from 1936 to 2006. The intimate, exclusive restaurant was one of the most prestigious dining addresses in Jerusalem. Specializing in European cuisine, the restaurant/bar made its kitchen kosher in 2003 in order to overcome several years of declining business and broaden its customer base beyond "politicians, journalists and diplomats".

The Downtown Triangle includes two hotels. Kikar Zion Hotel (Zion Square Hotel), which faced Zion Square from the south, occupied the site of the former Zion Cinema that gave the square its name. The cinema was demolished in 1972 and a high-rise building containing the Kikar Zion Hotel (on the upper floors) and a branch of Bank Hapoalim (on the lower floors) was erected. As of 2016, the hotel was being renovated for reopening as the Herbert Samuel Hotel. On the northern side of Zion Square stands the Jerusalem Hostel. This lodging opened as the Tel Aviv Hotel in 1926 and later became known as the Ron Hotel. Menachem Begin stood on one of the hotel's balconies on 3 August 1948, to announce the dissolution of the Irgun and the sign-up of his soldiers with the Israel Defense Forces.

== See also ==
- Ben Yehuda Street (Jerusalem)
- Jaffa Road
- King George Street (Jerusalem)
- Zion Square
