= King George Street (Jerusalem) =

Street in central Jerusalem

Coordinates: 31°46.892′N 35°12.988′E

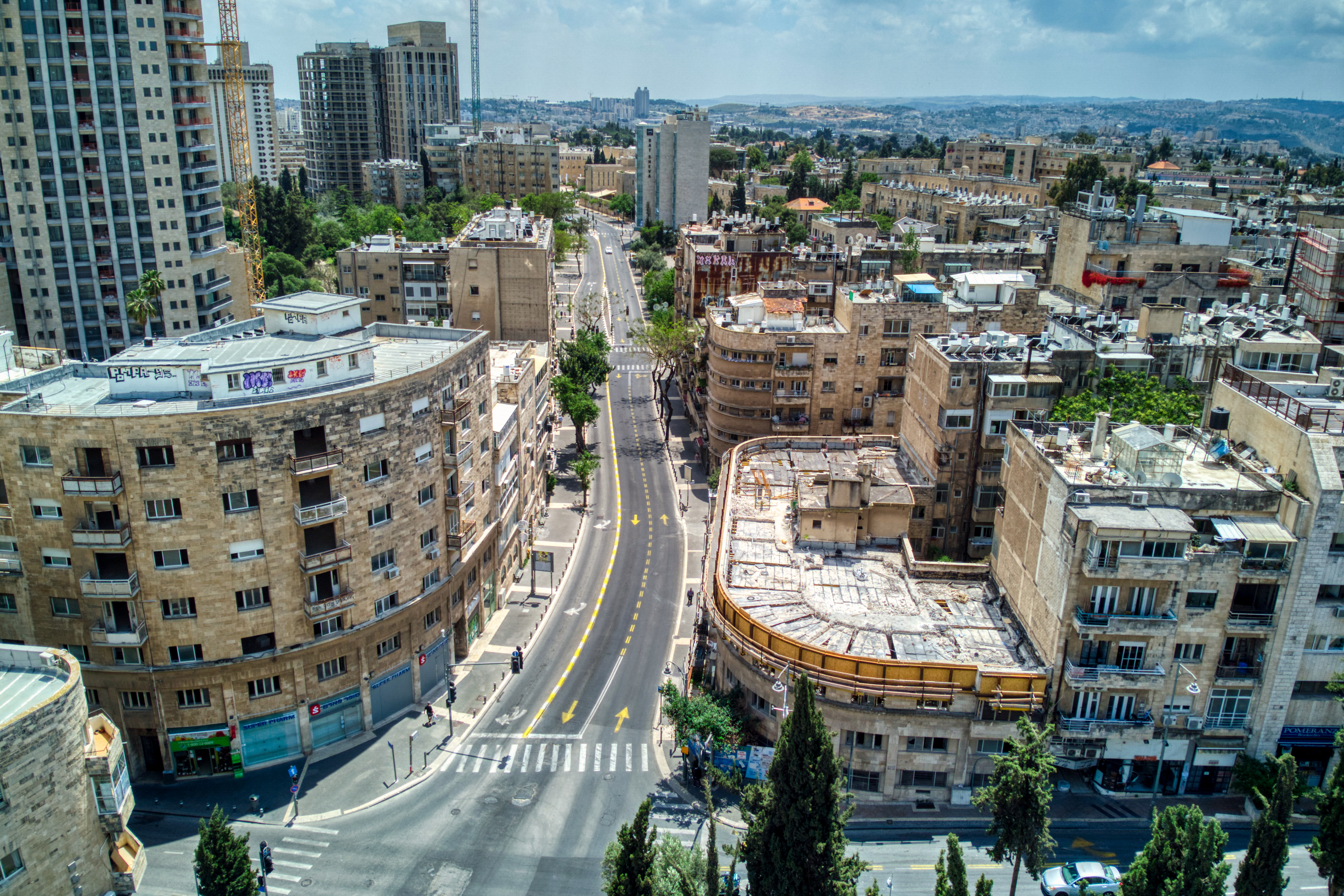
The southern part of King George Street in Jerusalem

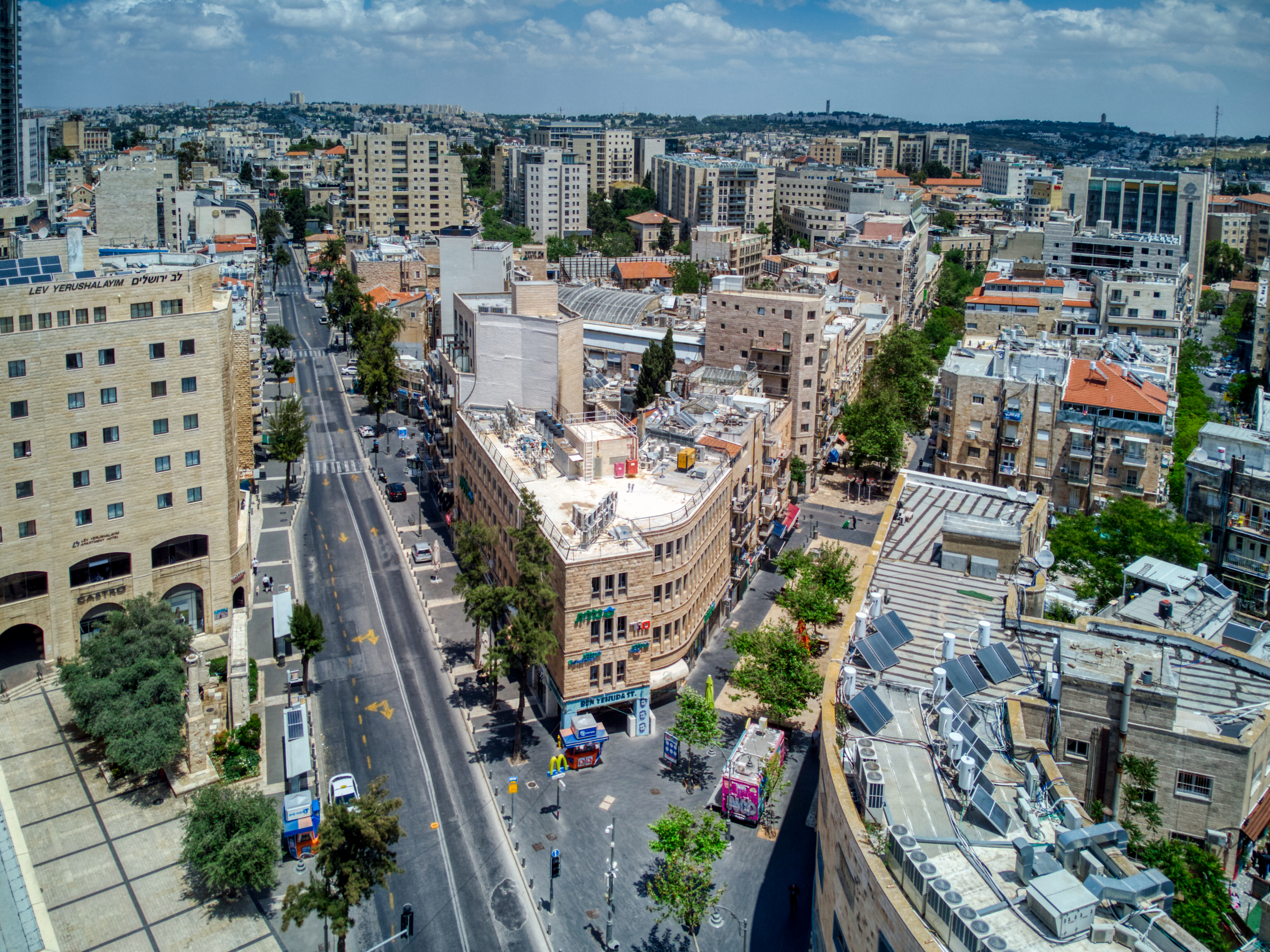
The northern part of King George Street in Jerusalem

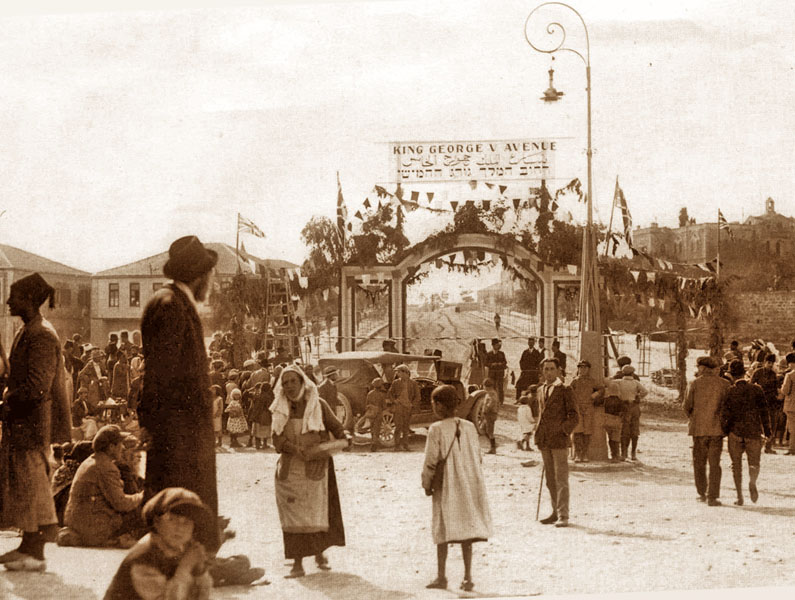
Inauguration of King George Street in Jerusalem

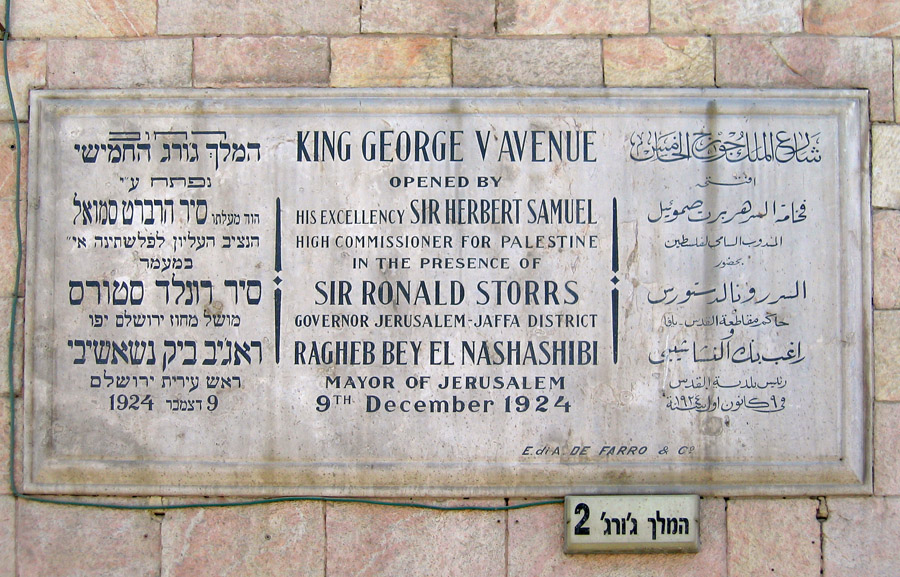
Commemorative plaque for the inauguration of King George Street in Jerusalem

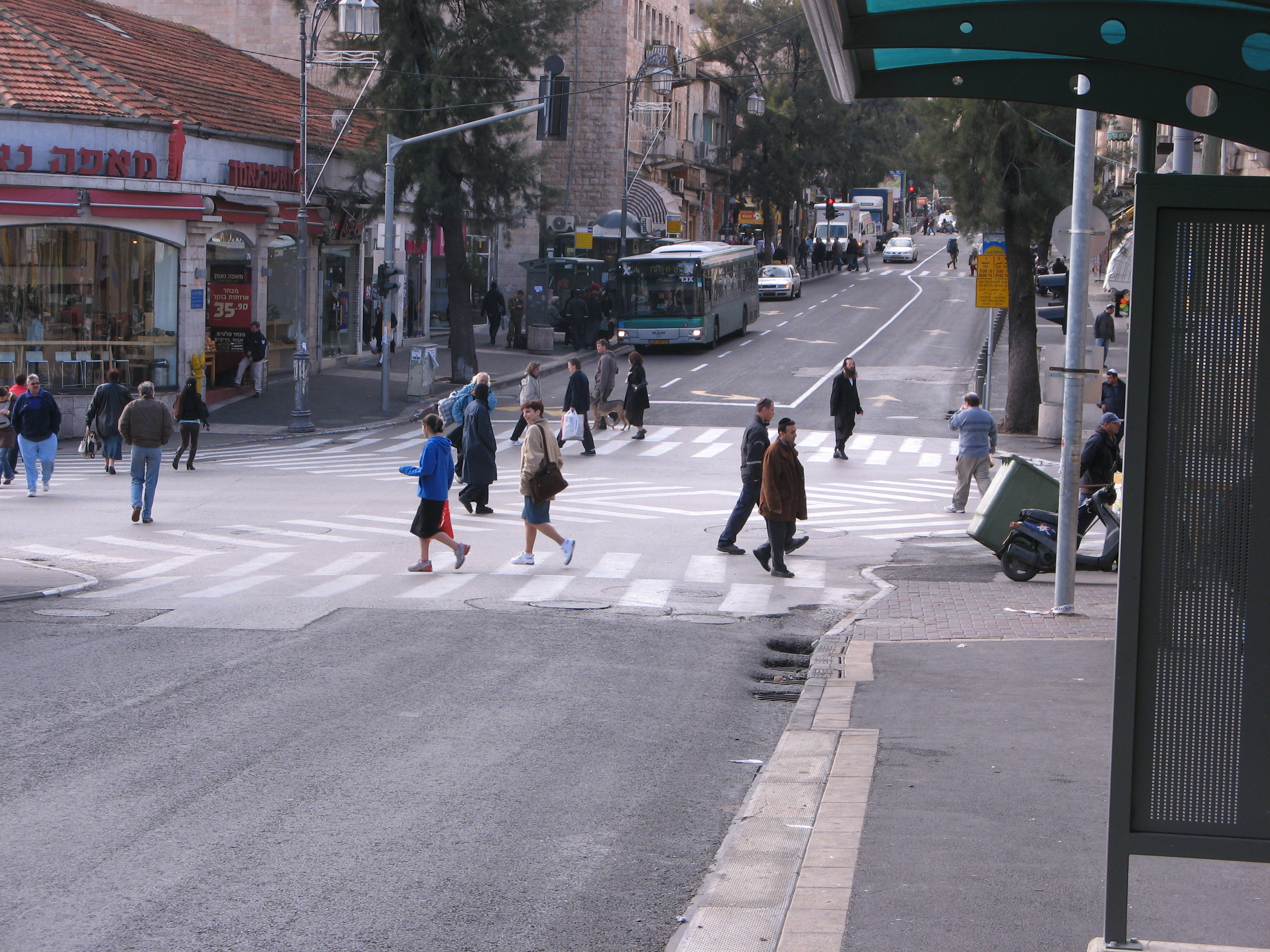
King George and Jaffa Street pedestrian scramble, 2007

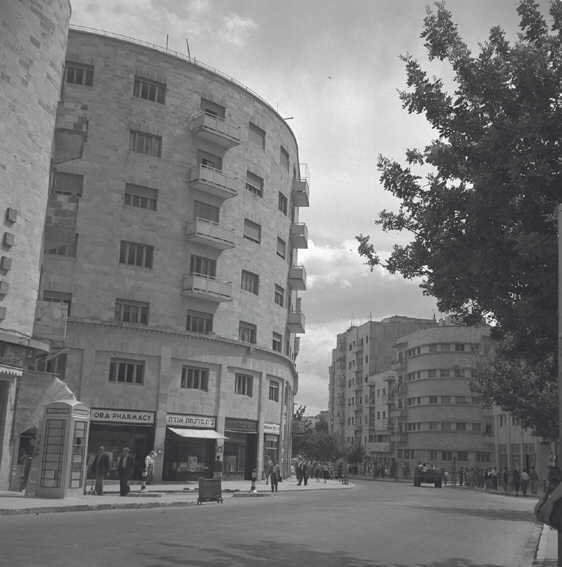
King George Street 1945

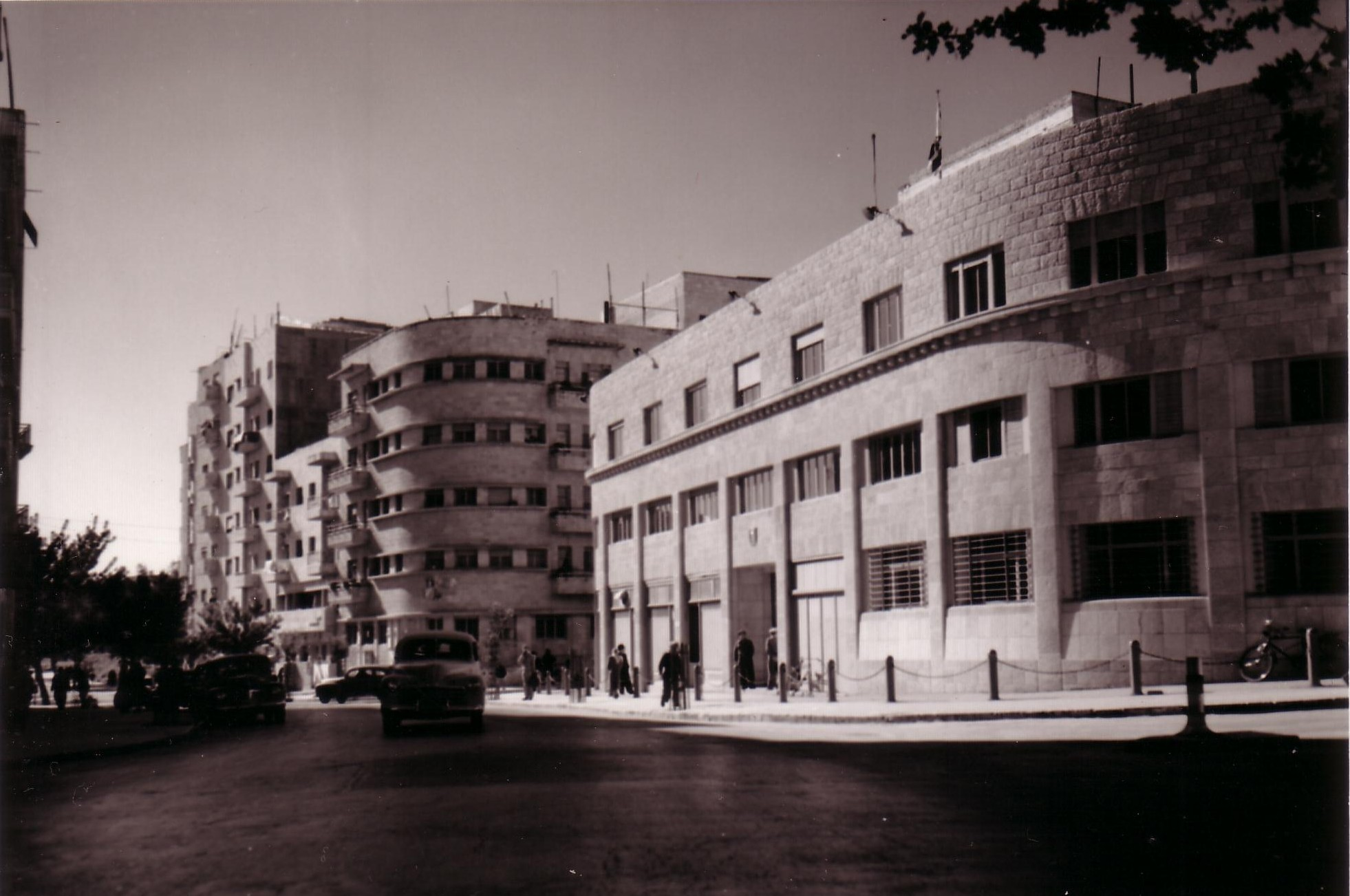
Froumine House, early 1950s

King George Street (Hebrew: רחוב המלך ג׳ורג׳, Rehov ha-Melekh Jorj, Arabic: شارع الملك جورج Shara'a al-Malik Jurj) is a street in central Jerusalem which joins the famous Ben Yehuda Street and Jaffa Road to form the Downtown Triangle central business district. The street was named in honour of King George V on December 9, 1924.

== History ==
King George Street was dedicated in honour of the seventh anniversary of the British conquest of Jerusalem under General Allenby. The inauguration took place in 1924, in the presence of Sir Herbert Samuel, the High Commissioner for Palestine, Sir Ronald Storrs, the military governor of Jerusalem, and Raghib al-Nashashibi, the Arab mayor of Jerusalem.

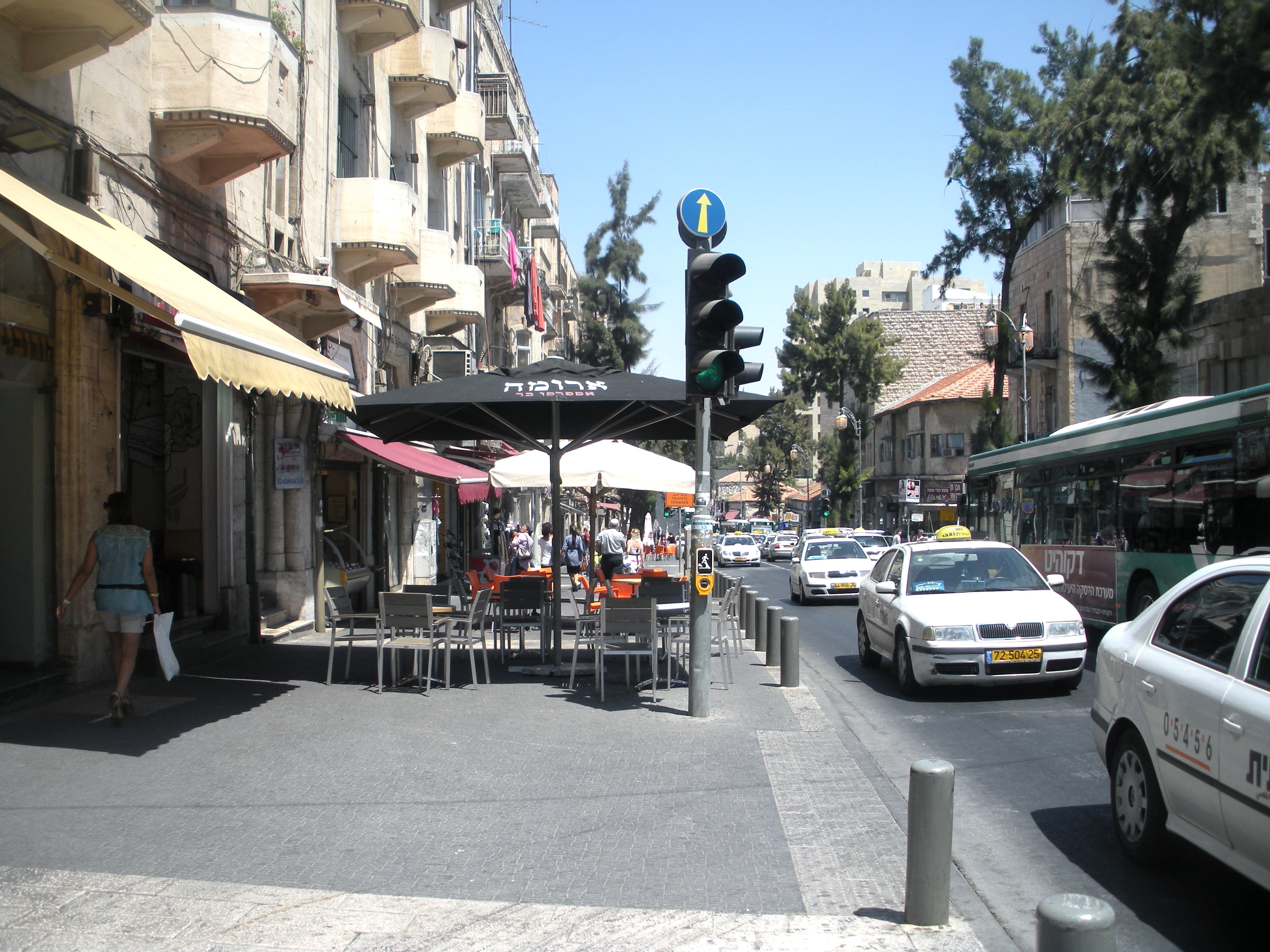
King George Street today

Jerusalem's first traffic light was installed at the intersection of King George Street and Jaffa Road. In 1950–1966, the Knesset, Israel's parliament, met at Beit Froumine on King George Street. It was used by Israel's first five governments, until the Knesset moved to a permanent building in Givat Ram.

Until the advent of the Jerusalem Light Rail, King George Street was one of two Jerusalem streets with a pedestrian scramble; the other is Kikar HaShabbat.

== Landmarks ==
- Great Synagogue and Heichal Shlomo
- Jewish Agency for Israel
- Beit HaMa'alot ("elevator house"), 1935 highrise building with elevator, architects Alexander Friedman and Meir Rubin
- Beit Avi Chai culture centre and Art Gallery
- The National Institutions House
- Independence Park
- Yeshurun Central Synagogue
- Shiber Pit, the former Menorah Garden – the small park with the bronze horse statue at the junction with Ben Yehuda Street.

== See also ==
- King George Street (Tel Aviv)
- 1984 King George Street attack
- Sbarro restaurant suicide bombing
- King George Street bombing

== Gallery ==
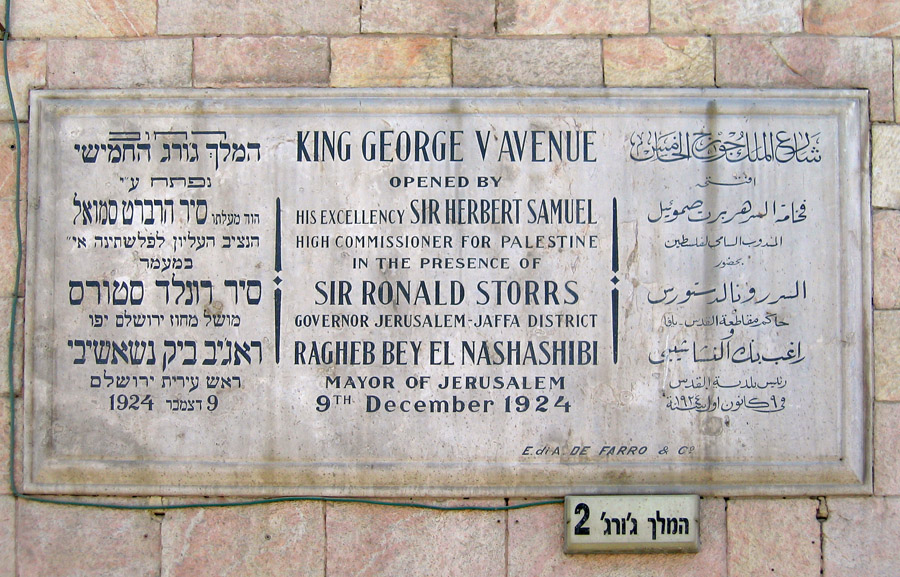
Commemorative plaque on King George Street

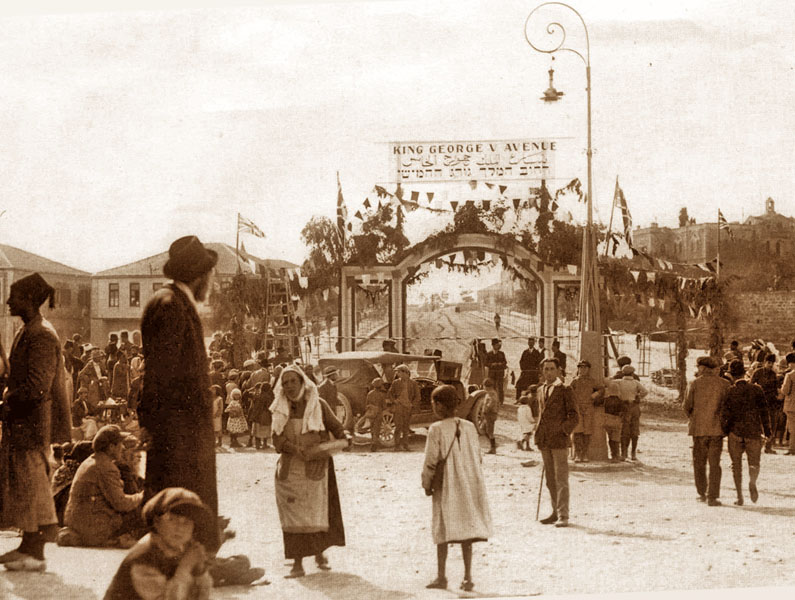
Dedication of the street in 1924

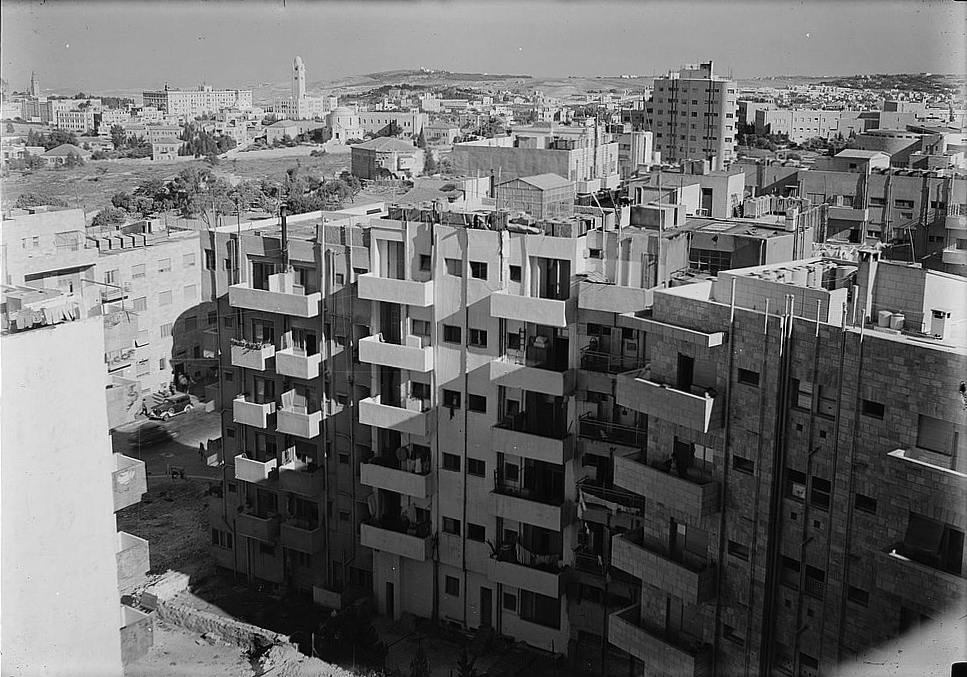
Construction of high-rise building on King George Street, 1940

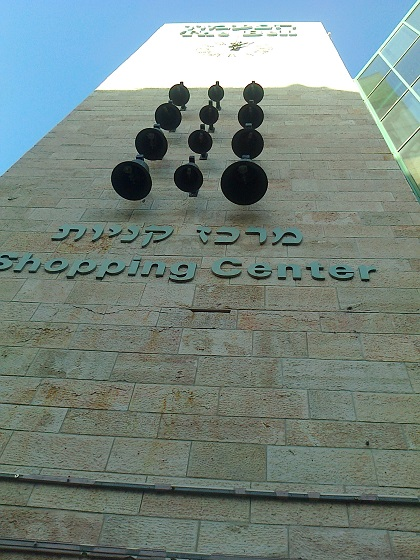
The carillon of the shopping center at the beginning of the street

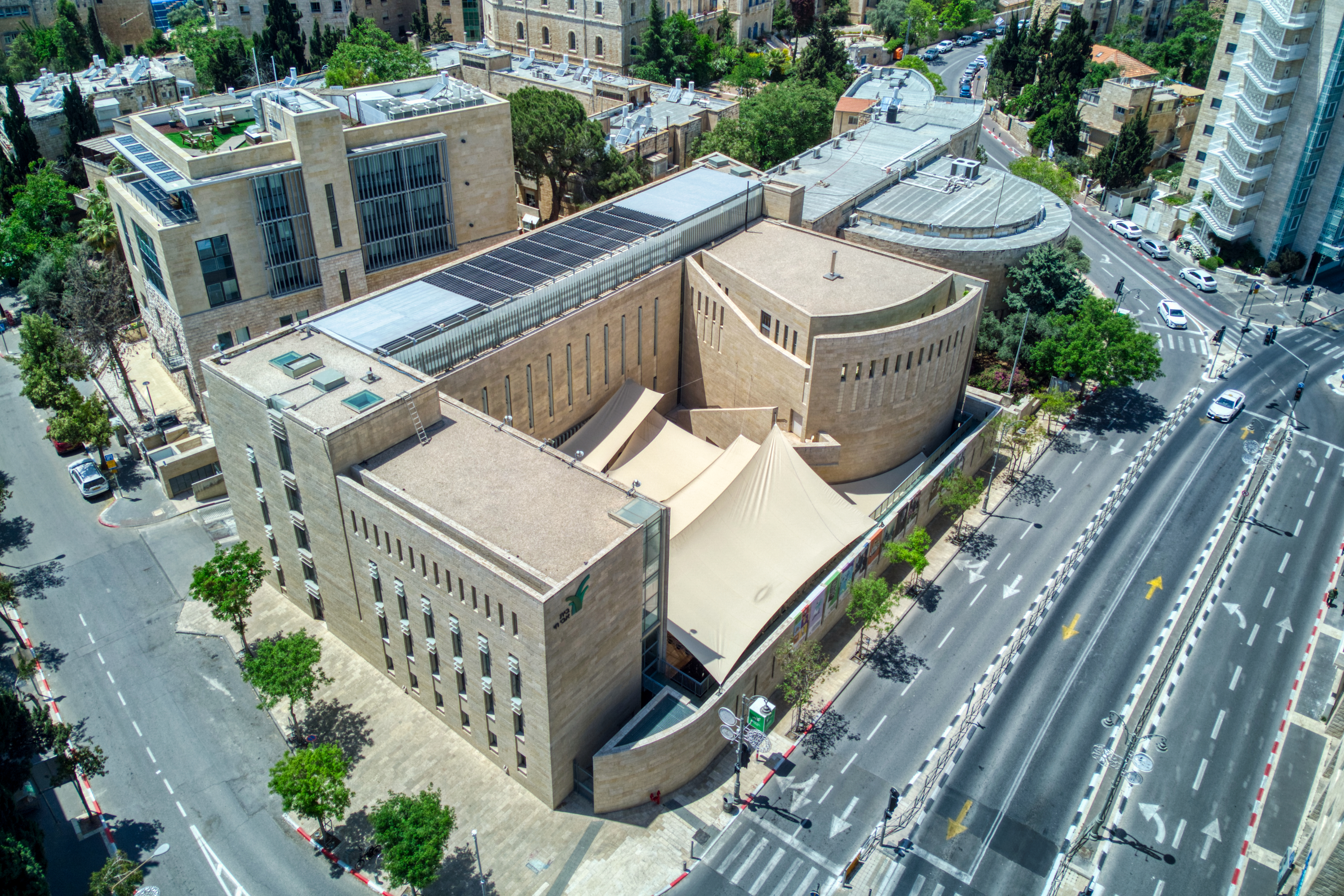
Beit Avi Chai
