= 1984 King George Street attack =

1984 terrorist attack

- Location: Jerusalem, Israel
- Date: 2 April 1984
- Attack type: Mass shooting, grenade attacks
- Deaths: 1 attacker
- Injuries: 48 civilians
- Perpetrators: DFLP and Abu Nidal

On 2 April 1984, a terrorist attack took place in which three Palestinian terrorists attacked civilians with machine guns and grenades on King George Street near Jaffa Road, Jerusalem's busiest intersection. 48 people were wounded, and one terrorist was killed by armed civilians.

== Attack ==
The attack began after two of the assailants first entered a menswear shop on King George Street, carrying plastic bags. According to the shopkeeper, they were trying on jeans when, "on a shouted signal from outside, they burst out of the changing cubicles brandishing weapons." One of the terrorists then ran out and started shooting at people, while another hurled grenades indiscriminately with wounded people lying all over the sidewalks. In response, some armed storekeepers and civilians pulled out pistols and chased and fatally wounded one of the terrorists, while the two others were caught by police.

Responsibility for the attack was claimed by the Democratic Front for the Liberation of Palestine (DFLP) and the Abu Nidal Organization (ANO). Israeli authorities did not rule out the possibility that the terrorists planned to seize the Ministry of Tourism which was located near the scene of the attack and to take hostages there, which the DFLP had claimed it did.

Israeli Prime Minister Yitzhak Shamir pledged in a brief statement that "the assailants and those who sent them will not go unpunished." After the attack, Israel sent warplanes over the Syrian-occupied mountains west of Lebanon's Bekaa Valley, where Israeli gunners had bombarded suspected Palestinian guerrilla 'command posts' the day before.
