= Ben Yehuda Street (Jerusalem) =

Street in Jerusalem

Coordinates: 31.7815°N 35.2176°E

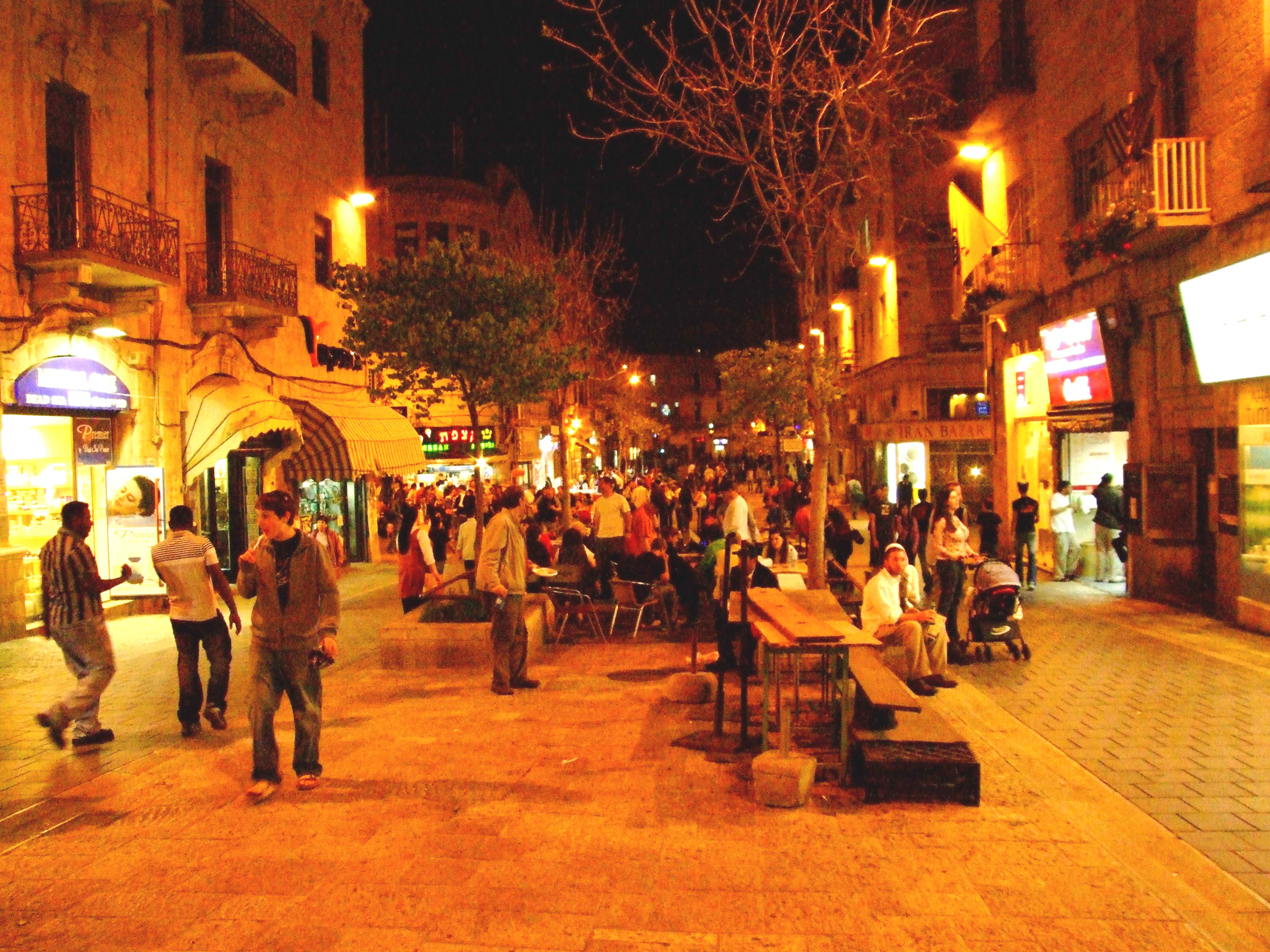
Ben Yehuda Street at night.

Ben Yehuda Street (Hebrew: רחוב בן יהודה), known as the "Midrachov" (Hebrew: מדרחוב), is arguably the most famous street in Jerusalem, along with Jaffa Road. Ben Yehuda Street joins with Jaffa Road and King George Street in the heart of downtown Jerusalem to form the main Downtown Triangle central business district. Closed to vehicular traffic, the street is now Jerusalem's most popular pedestrian mall. The street runs from the intersection of King George Street east to Zion Square and Jaffa Road. The street is named after the founder of Modern Hebrew, Eliezer Ben-Yehuda.

== History ==
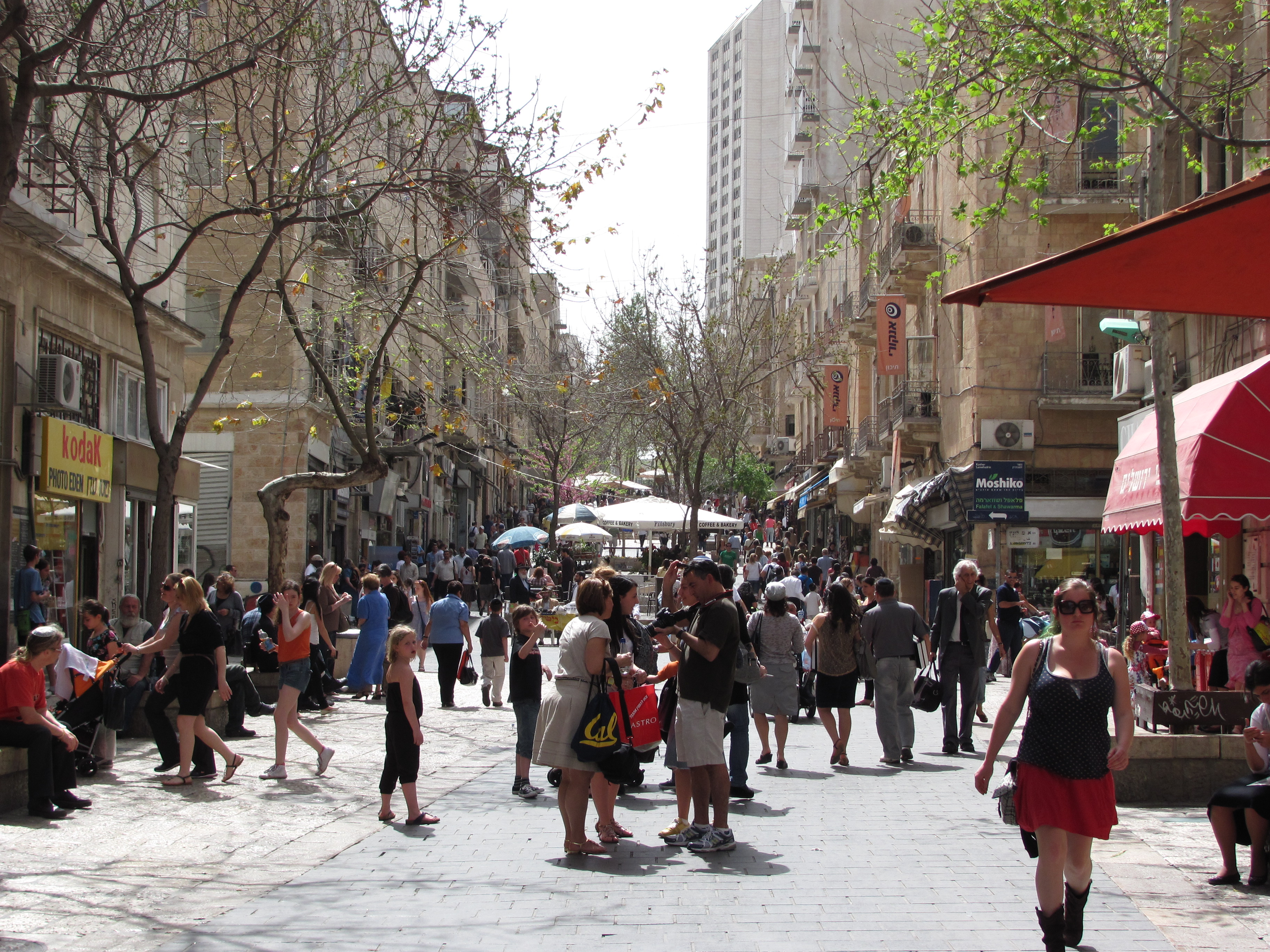
Ben Yehuda Street by day.

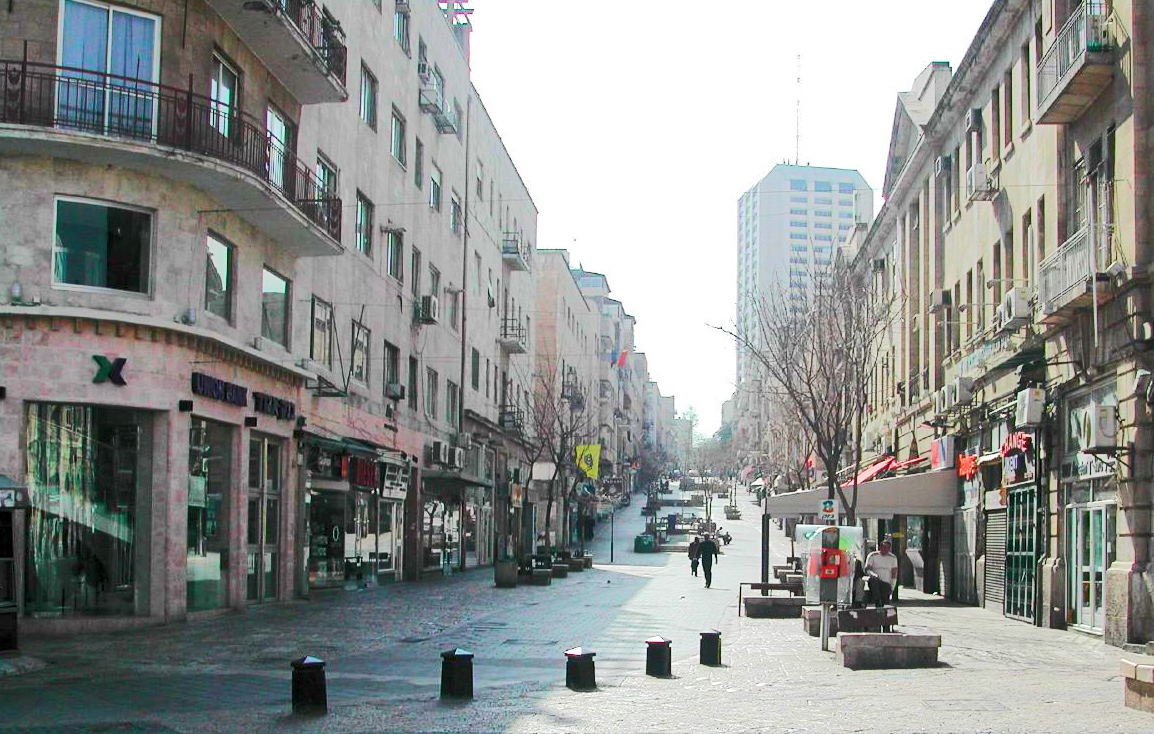
Ben Yehuda Street on Shabbat, when businesses are closed (view from Zion Square).

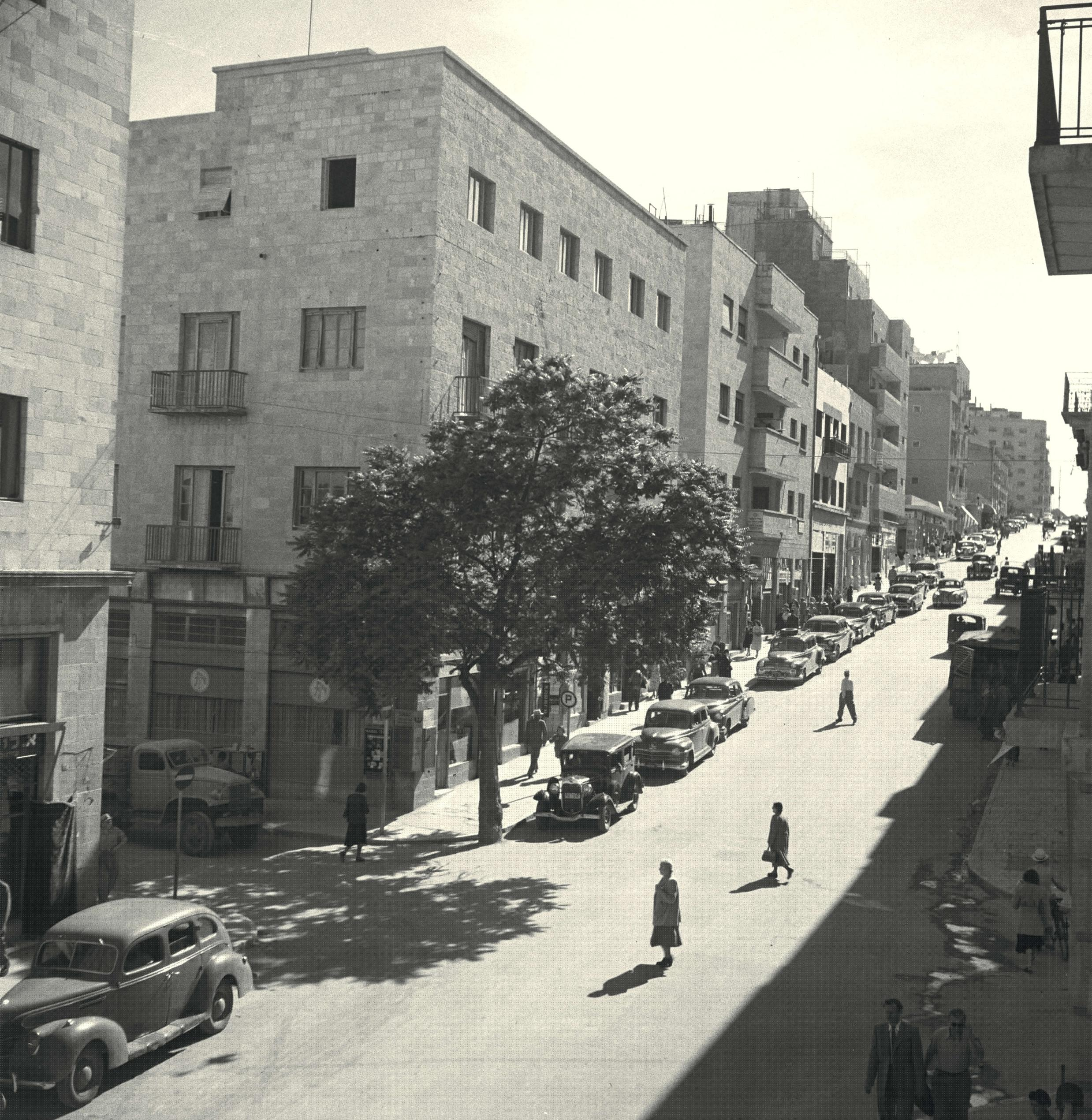
Ben Yehuda St in the 1940s.

Ben Yehuda was already one of Jerusalem's main streets long before the establishment of the State of Israel in 1948. As a busy thoroughfare, it has been a prime target for terrorist bombings between 1948, when the worst atrocity happened, and 2001, during the Second Intifada.

In 1983, the street was closed to automobile traffic. In Hebrew it is called a midrachov (pedestrian mall – a Hebrew neologism formed from the words "midracha" [sidewalk] and "rechov" [street]. Many of the businesses cater to tourists. The street is lined with souvenir and Judaica shops and sidewalk cafes, and street musicians play there throughout the day. It was long considered the "secular heart of Jerusalem", but since the 2000s, disaffected Orthodox Jewish youth have joined the mix of tourists and locals.

== Gallery ==
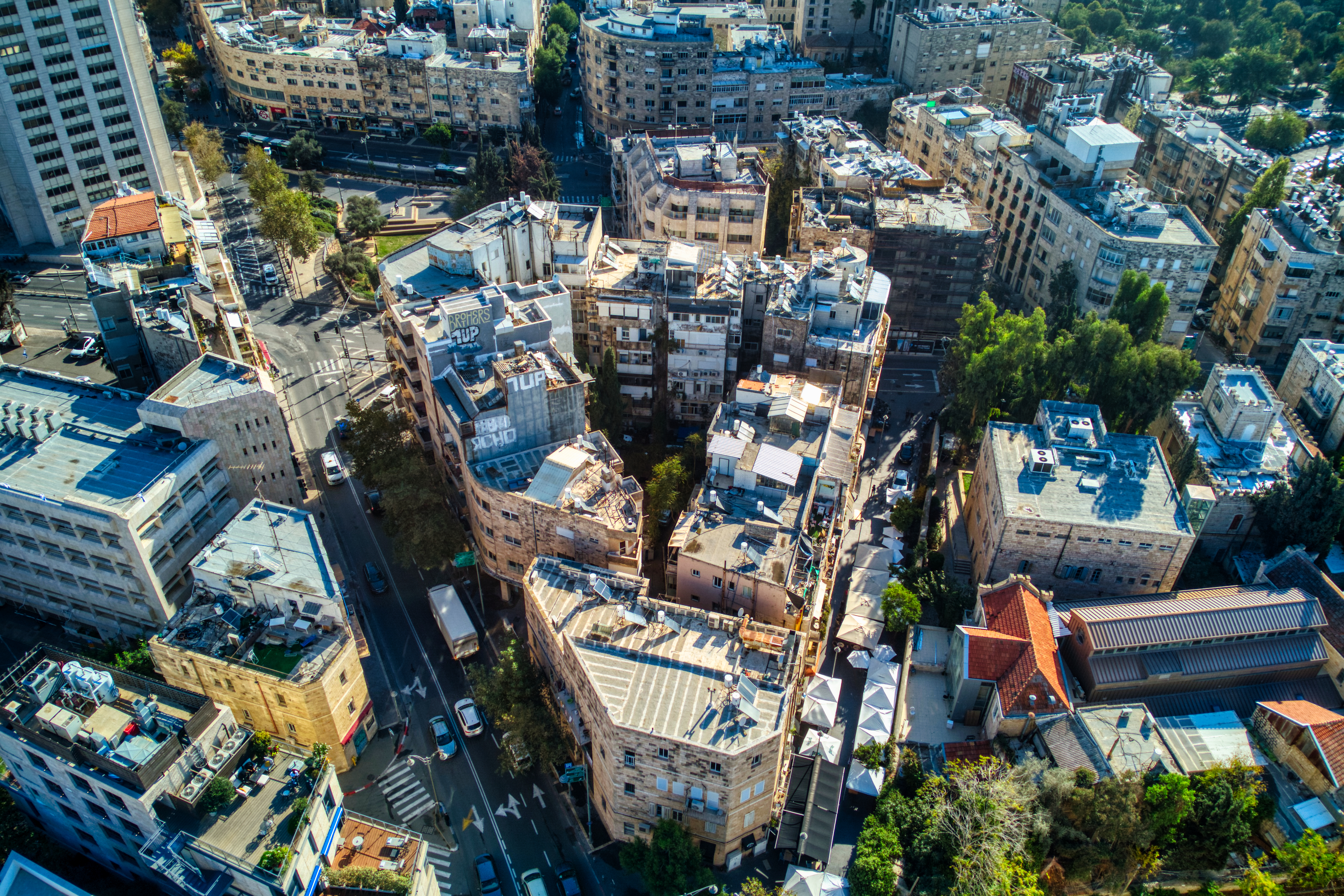
The upper part of the street

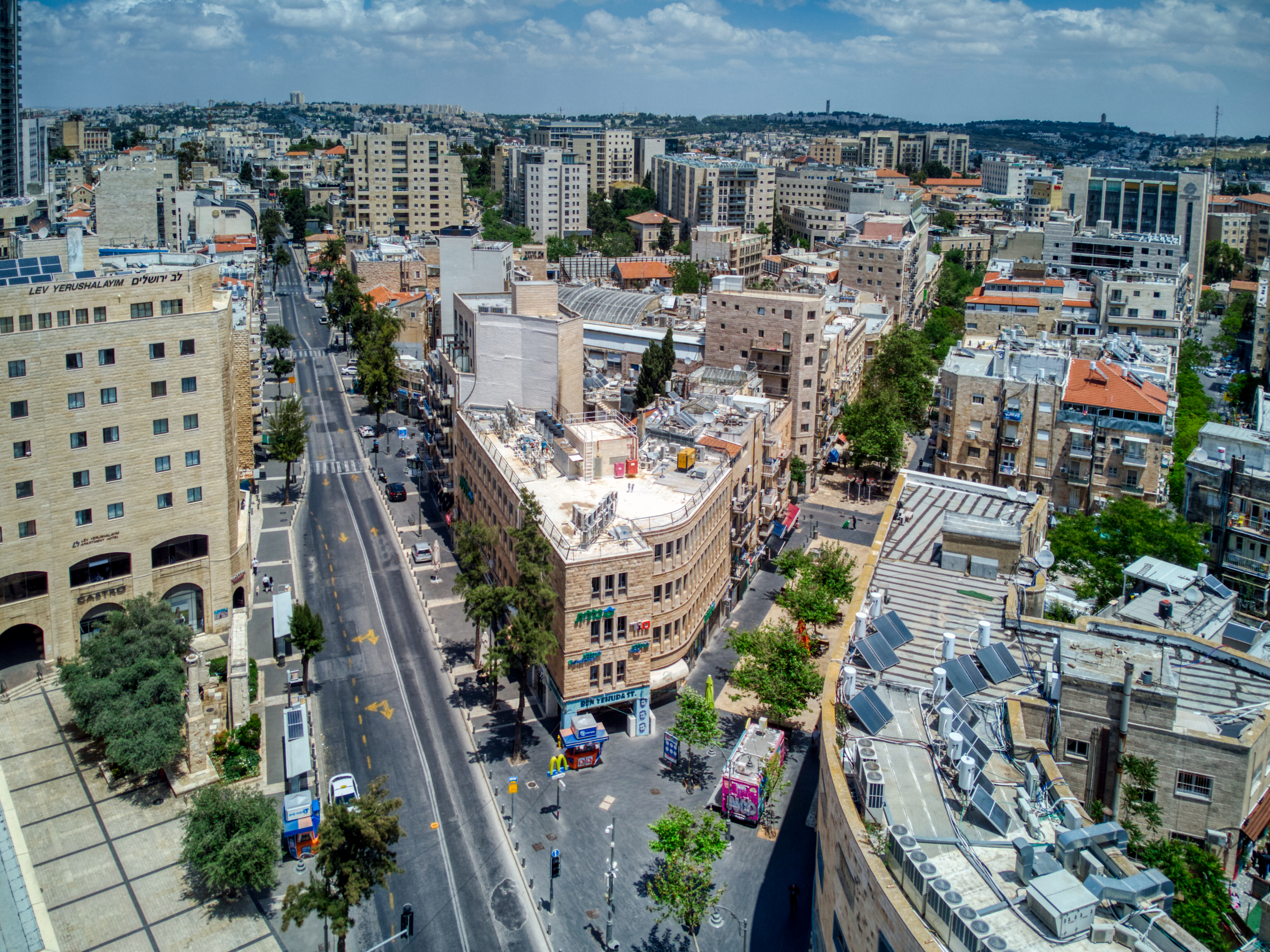
The lower part of the street

== See also ==
- Ben Yehuda Street bombings
