= Zion Square =

Public square in Jerusalem

- Public square
- Kikar Zion
- כיכר ציון
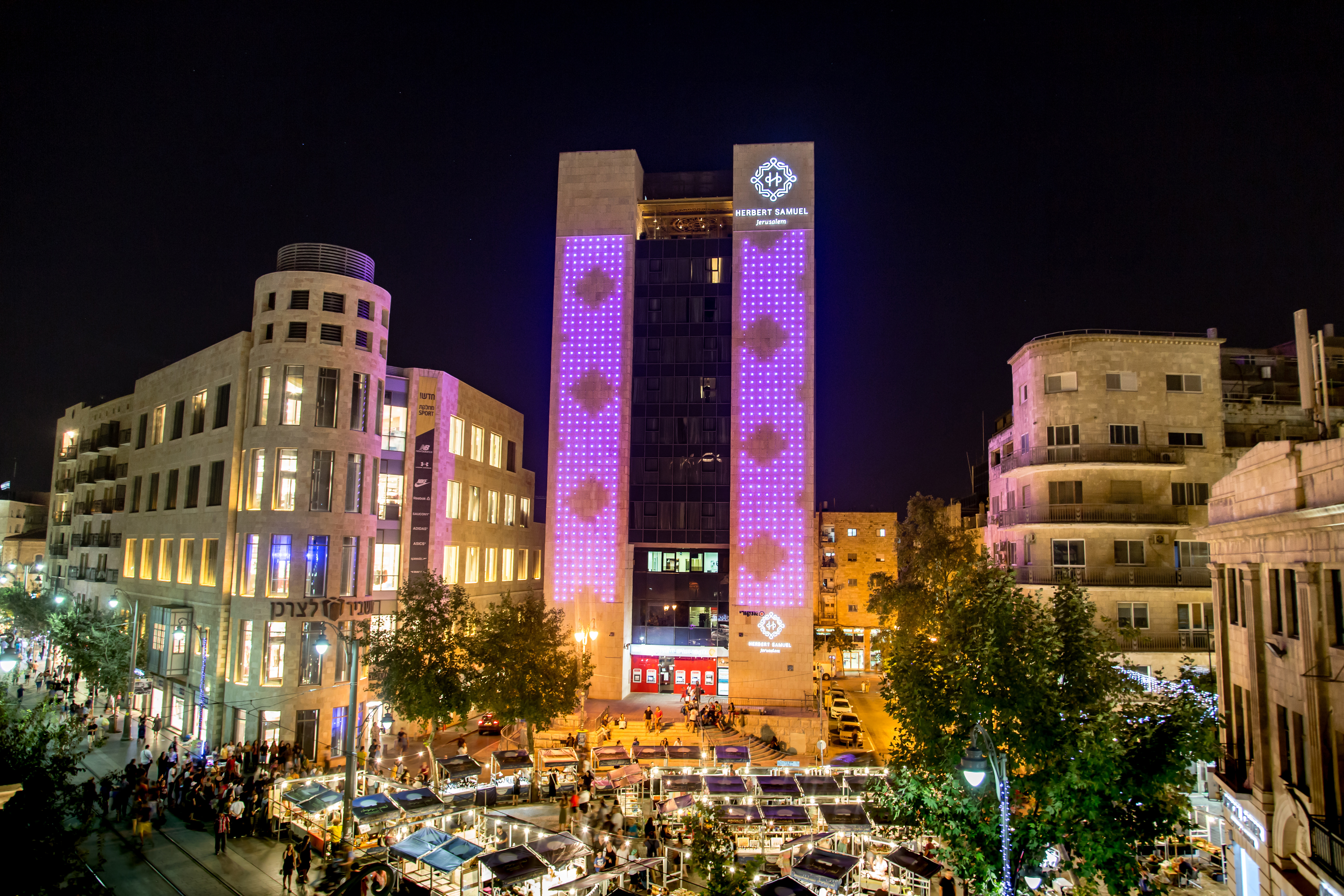
- Constructed: 1924
- Location: Intersection of Jaffa Road, Ben Yehuda Street, Herbert Samuel Street, and Yoel Moshe Salomon Street; Jerusalem
- Interactive map of Zion Square
- Coordinates: 31°46′55″N 35°13′11″E

Zion Square (Hebrew: כיכר ציון, romanized: Kikar Tziyon) is a public square in Jerusalem, located at the intersection of Jaffa Road, Ben Yehuda Street, Herbert Samuel Street, and Yoel Moshe Salomon Street.

The square is one of the vertices of the Downtown Triangle commercial district. Since the British Mandate era, Zion Square has been the focal point of the cultural life of downtown Jerusalem. The square is busy day and night with tourists, elderly immigrants, overseas students, local youth, street performers, and religious activists. In recent decades, the square has become a hangout for disaffected and homeless youth.

From the 1930s to 2011, the square was a popular site for mass protests and demonstrations.

== Name ==
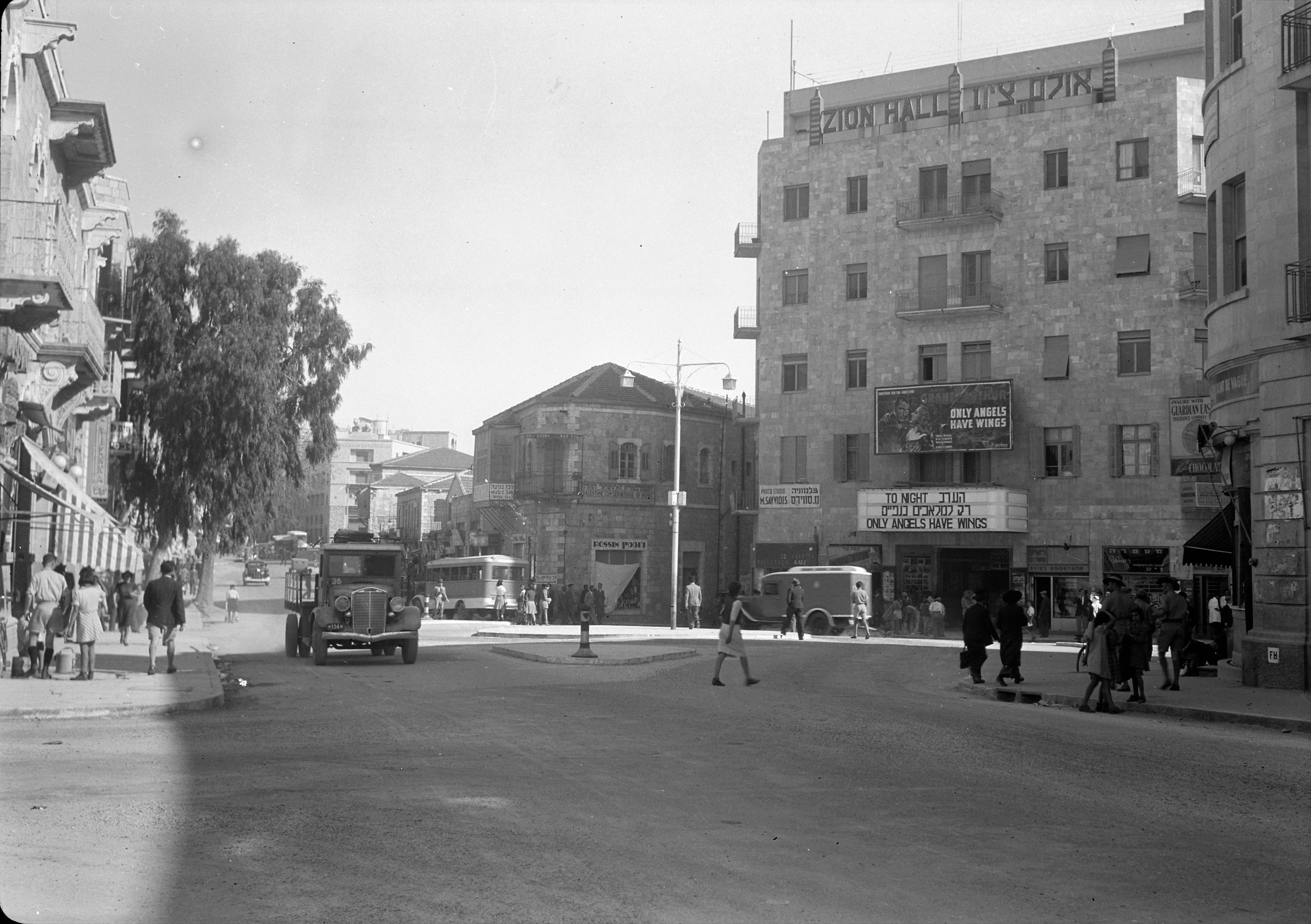
Zion Cinema, also called Zion Hall (right), early 1940s.

The square, originally called Zion Circus, was named for the Zion Cinema (also called Zion Hall), a 400-seat silent movie house which occupied a hut on the site from 1912 to 1920. After the hut collapsed under a heavy snowfall, the cinema was reconstructed as a 600-seat theater for film screenings and live opera performances.

== History ==
Zion Square, 1950.

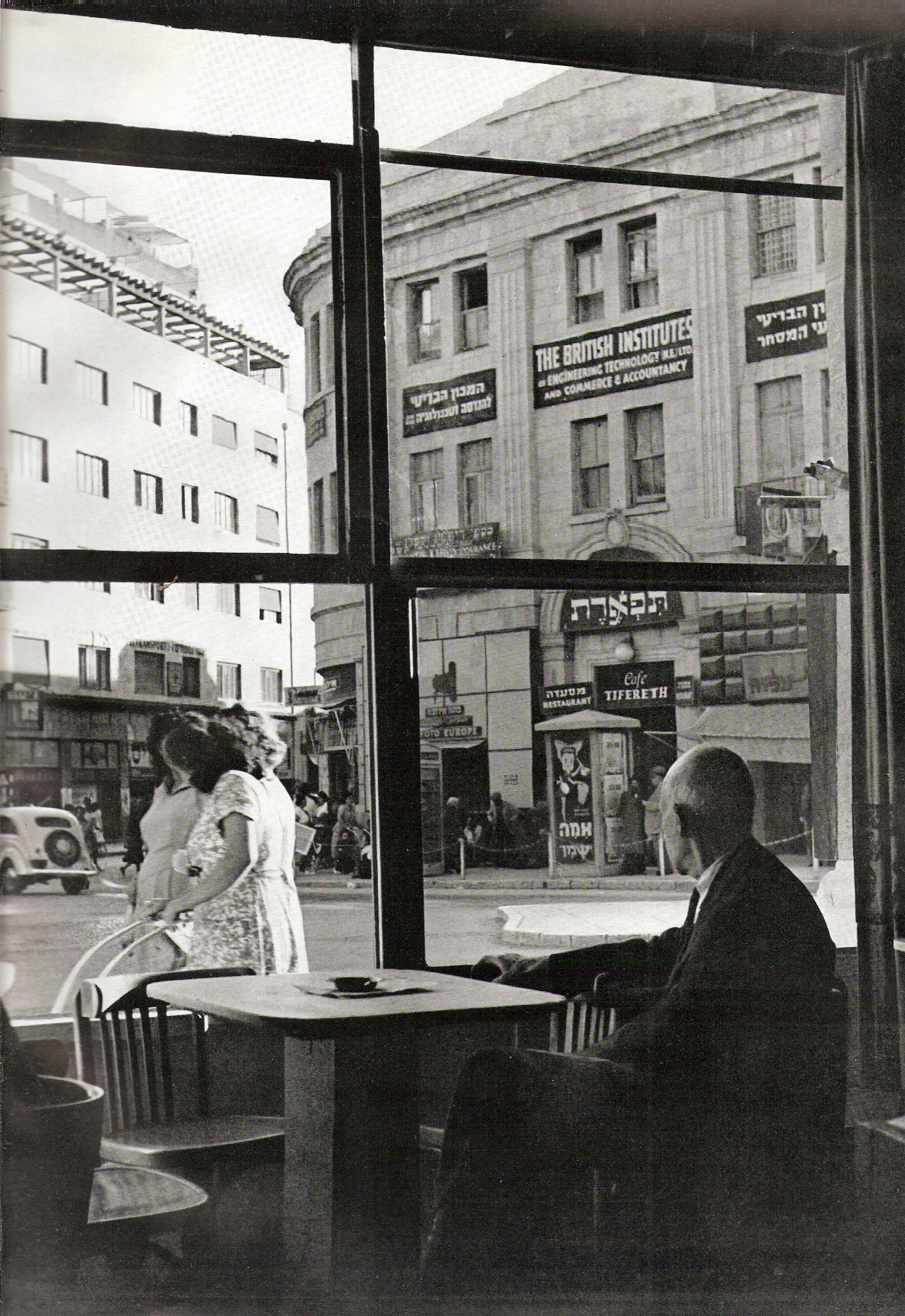
View of Zion Square through the windows of the Vienna Cafe, 1950.

The land on which Zion Square and the Downtown Triangle lies was purchased by the Jewish Colonization Association from the Greek Orthodox Patriarchate, which began selling off some of its holdings in Jerusalem after World War I. Mandate officials developed the field into a triangular district bordered by Jaffa Road, Ben Yehuda Street (constructed by the British in 1922) and King George Street (constructed by the British in 1924). Zion Square was also designed by the British as a roundabout.

The popularity of the films, operas, plays, concerts and lectures presented at the Zion Cinema turned Zion Square into the “center of cultural life in Jerusalem” in the 1920s and 1930s. Movie- and theater-goers gravitated between the cinema and the many cafes and coffee houses in the Downtown Triangle; two of the popular cafes were located in Zion Square itself: the Vienna Cafe and the Europa Cafe.

=== Political demonstrations ===
Zion Square became a rallying point for political demonstrations and social protests beginning in the 1930s, when young Zionists held rallies here. From the 1950s to the 2000s, primarily right-wing demonstrations were staged here. Several demonstrations turned violent, such as a 1971 protest by the Israeli Black Panthers in which Prime Minister Golda Meir was burned in effigy, and a 1995 protest against Prime Minister Yitzhak Rabin and the signing of the Taba Agreement (Oslo II), after which thousands of protesters continued on to the Knesset, destroying property en route. The largest demonstrations in the square included a May 2000 protest decrying the handover of Arab settlements adjacent to the Mount of Olives, a November 2000 protest against Ehud Barak's "policy of restraint" at the beginning of the Second Intifada, and a 2006 protest against the policies of acting prime minister Ehud Olmert, each of which drew around an estimated 100,000 people.

With the opening of the Jerusalem Light Rail on Jaffa Road in August 2011, Jerusalem police stopped issuing permits for demonstrations in Zion Square to avoid the disruption of light-rail operations.

=== Terrorist attacks ===
The Zion Cinema was the site of two attempted bombings, one in 1951 and the other in 1967. In both cases, an incendiary device was planted under the theater seats and was discovered before it detonated.

On July 4, 1975, a refrigerator loaded with 5 kilograms (11 lb) of explosives detonated in Zion Square, killing 15 and wounding 77. At the time, the attack was the deadliest ever against Israeli citizens by a booby-trapped bomb. On March 24, 1979, a bomb exploded in a garbage can in Zion Square, killing one and wounding 13.

On November 13, 1975, an explosive charge went off near Cafe Naveh on Jaffa Road, near the pedestrian mall. Six people were killed and 40 injured. 48

On the night of August 16–17, 2012, dozens of Jewish teens chased four Palestinian teens in Zion Square and beat one of them unconscious, in what Israeli police and witnesses described as an attempted lynching.

=== Decline and redevelopment ===
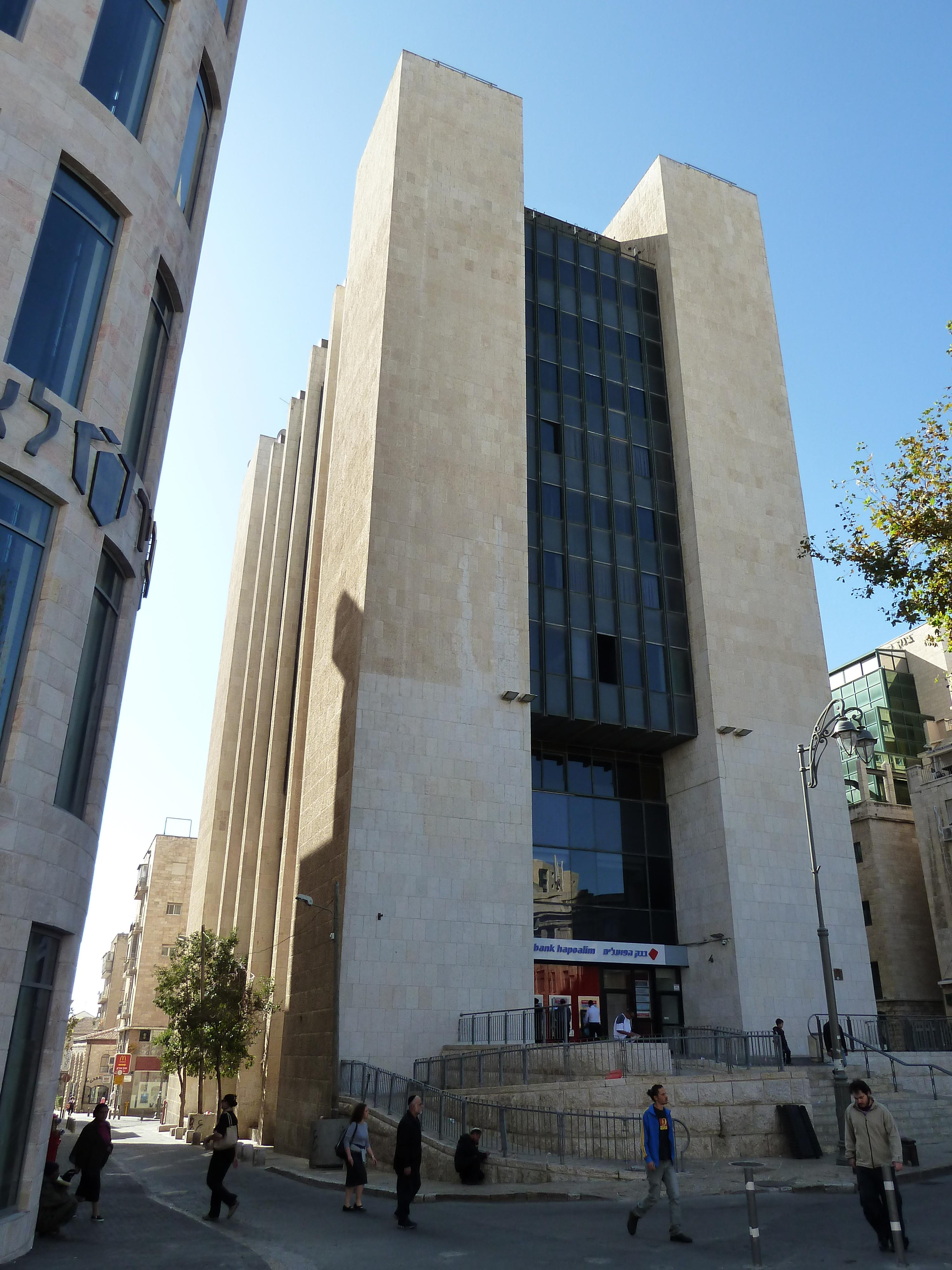
Kikar Zion Hotel (upper stories) and Bank HaPoalim branch on the site of the former Zion Cinema.

Following the reunification of Jerusalem in 1967, the city embarked on significant expansion. Large commercial centers were opened in the new, outlying neighborhoods of Talpiot, Givat Shaul, and Malha, weaning customers away from the city center. Government offices began moving out as well, precipitating the economic decline of the Downtown Triangle in the 1970s. The advent of television precipitated the closure of most of the Triangle's cinemas. The Zion Cinema closed in 1972 and was demolished. In its place, a high-rise building containing the Kikar Zion Hotel (on the upper floors) and a branch of Bank Hapoalim (on the lower floors) was erected.

In 1983 Zion Square was converted into a pedestrian promenade along with Ben Yehuda Street and other streets in the Downtown Triangle in a successful effort to revitalize the downtown district.

In 2006 the Jerusalem Foundation floated a secret proposal to rename the square Rapaport Plaza, after a Waco, Texas philanthropist who pledged $2 million toward the square's renovation. Architect Ron Arad of London was hired and presented a plan to install a towering, red, reflective steel sculpture as a focal point for the square. The plan, which was not reported to the public, was spotted on the Jerusalem Foundation website and brought to public attention by Lemallah, a grassroots citizens watch group, which launched a successful public protest against the name change and the sculpture. At the same time, Lemallah produced its own counterproposal for a round, six-sided, steel "peace dome" to span the square and Jaffa Road. That idea, too, did not come to fruition.

In early 2016, a contest was held to redesign the square and on September 13, 2016, the Jerusalem Municipality announced that its panel had chosen a design by Maya Atidia and Tamir Manzur-Carmel called "Urban Forest Clearing" as the winner. Redevelopment work began in 2018, with the installation of a stage, public seating, and trees of the plane, carob, Mediterranean hackberry, and pear varieties.

== Street scene ==
Zion Square is packed at all hours with a broad cross-section of Jerusalem life: bearded mystics, heavily armed police, declaiming self-styled holy men, jubilant Hassidim, sullen teenagers, bright-eyed tour groups and street musicians.

— Go Jerusalem.com

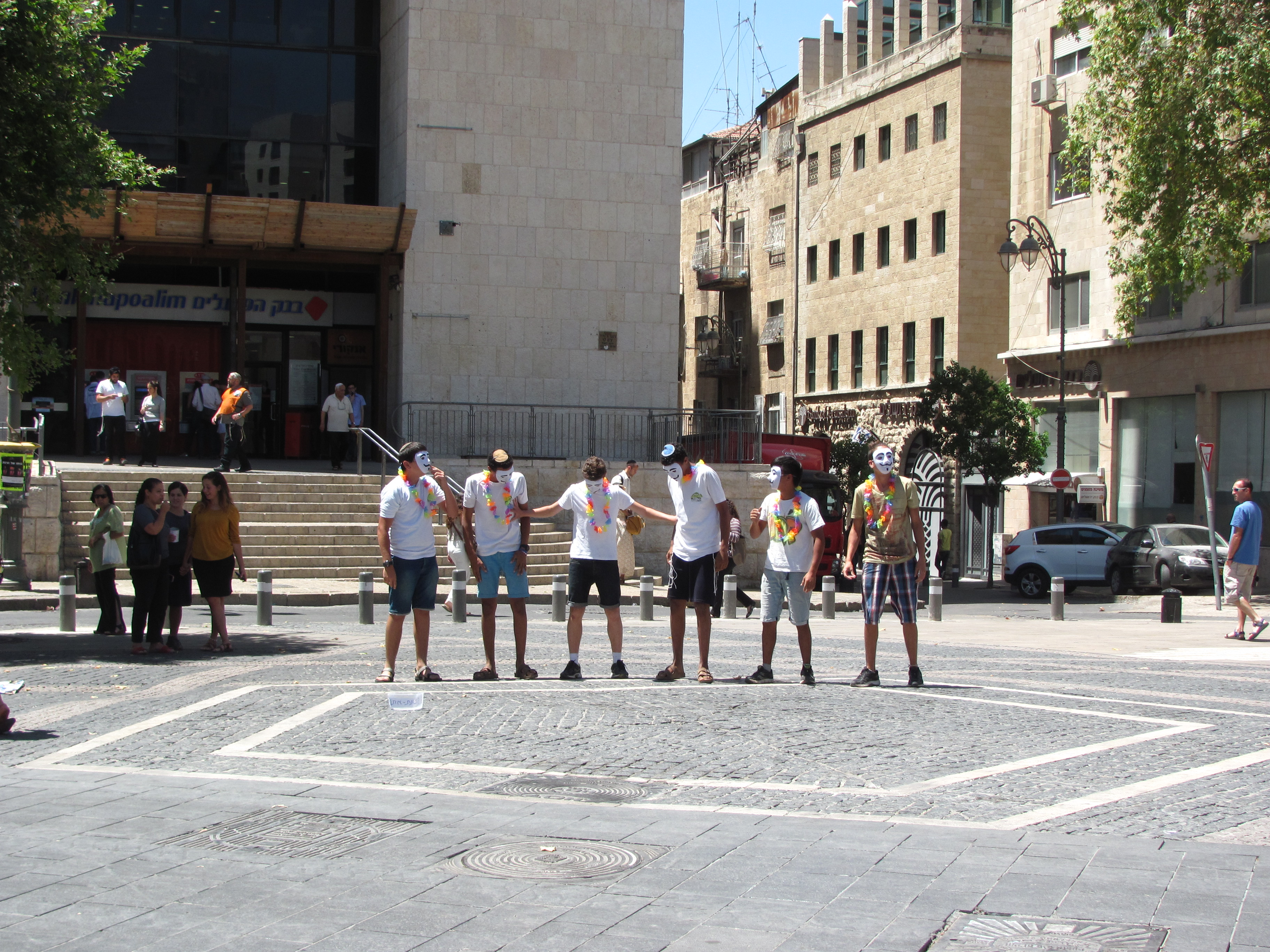
Street performers in Zion Square

Zion Square is busy day and night as a meeting place and hangout for people from all walks of life, including tourists, elderly immigrants, seminary students, street performers, and Chabad and Breslov activists. Zion Square has been described as "always crowded, always crazy".

The square is a hangout for drug users. An estimated 70 percent of teenagers who hang out in the square take drugs. The open, street-level basement of the Kikar Zion Hotel is a well-known haunt for both drug dealers and prostitutes.

School dropouts, disaffected religious immigrant teens, and homeless youth are also fixtures in the square. Street workers have identified large groups of Russian immigrant youth hanging out in the square and drinking vodka purchased with money panhandled off tourists. The square also attracts sizable numbers of settlement youth uprooted by the 2005 Israeli disengagement from Gaza. To reach out to at-risk and disaffected "square dwellers", several drop-in centers operate in the vicinity of Zion Square, including Crossroads, Hameshulash, Hezroni's Squat, and The Zone. The ELEM – Youth Distress in Israel organization brings a mobile unit to Zion Square on weeknights to engage street youth in art projects.

== Landmarks ==
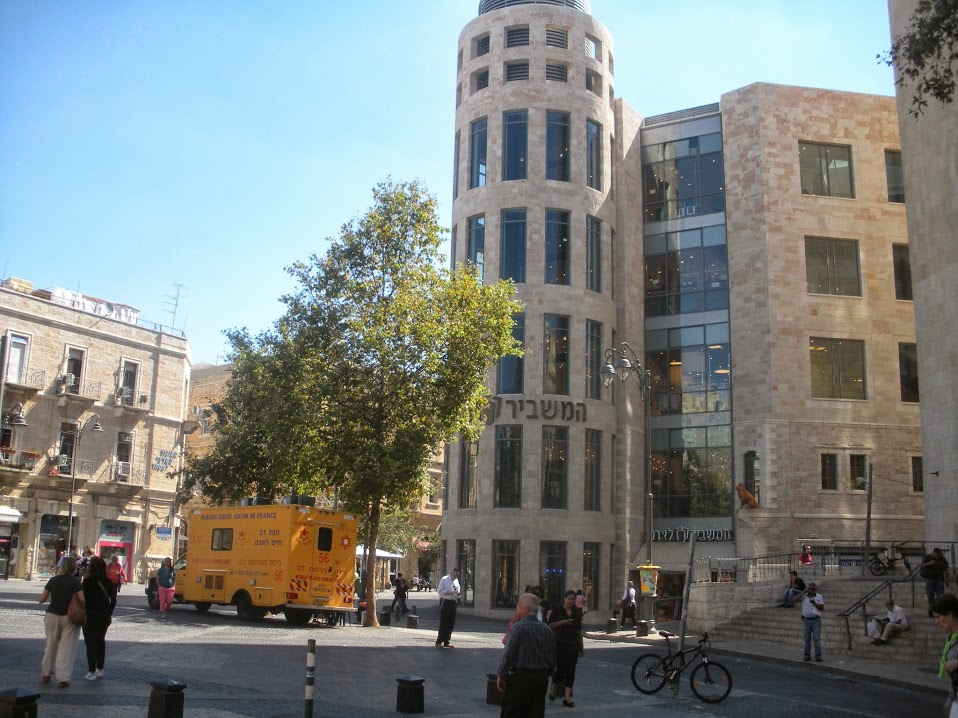
Hamashbir Lazarchan department store at Zion Square.

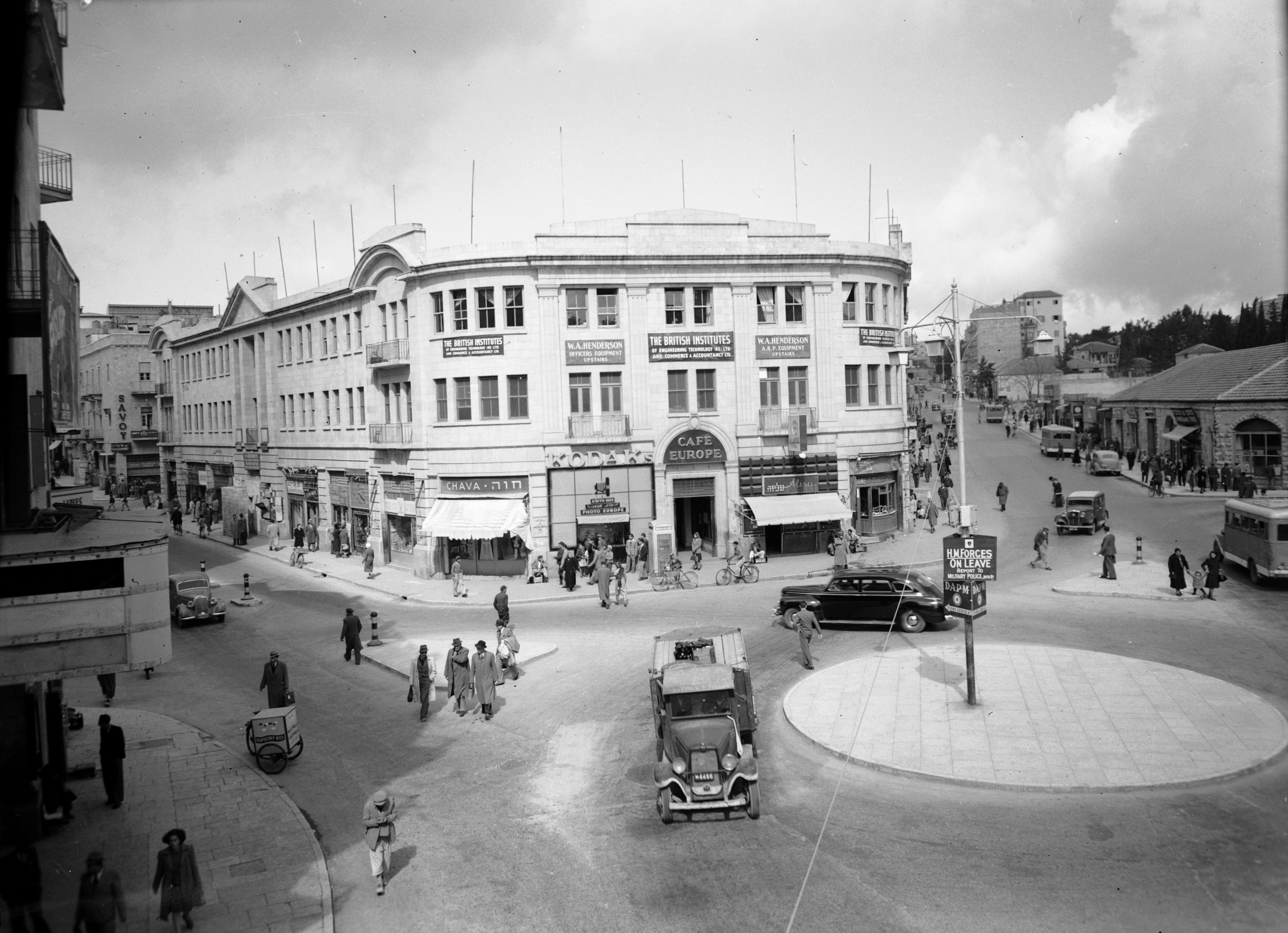
Cafe Europe in the Sansur Building at Zion Square, circa 1934–1946.

Zion Cinema was the central landmark of Zion Square from the 1920s. Located on the south side of Zion Square, it was originally a 400-seat silent-movie hut and, after snowfall destroyed the structure, was rebuilt into a 600-seat theatre that staged plays, concerts, lectures, and films. In the 1920s and 1930s the Zion Cinema was the cultural center of Jerusalem. After its closure, the building was demolished and a high-rise containing the Kikar Zion Hotel and a branch of Bank HaPoalim was erected in its place. In 2013 the 117-room hotel was purchased by Orchid Hotel Management Ltd., which is renovating the property for reopening as the Herbert Samuel Hotel. The hotel will have 137 rooms and suites, and a kosher rooftop restaurant with a 360-degree panoramic view.

Hamashbir Lazarchan, a seven-story, 5,000 square metres (54,000 sq ft) department store that opened on the east side of Zion Square in 2011, is the largest department store in Israel and the flagship store of the 38-store chain. The store was originally established in 1947 on the opposite side of Jaffa Road, and moved to a location near King George and Ben Yehuda Streets from 1970 to 2010.

On the north side of Zion Square stands the Jerusalem Hostel. This lodging opened as the Tel Aviv Hotel in 1926 and later became known as the Ron Hotel. Menachem Begin stood on one of the hotel's balconies on August 3, 1948, to announce the dissolution of the Irgun and the sign-up of his soldiers with the Israel Defense Forces.

On the west side of Zion Square stands the Sansur Building, erected in 1929. This three-story office and commercial building sports an "eclectic", neo-Renaissance and classical design. The building was commissioned by and named for a Christian Arab merchant from Bethlehem and originally housed Cafe Europe, a popular coffeehouse patronized by Jews, Arabs, and British in the 1930s and 1940s. In 1947-48 it housed the Jerusalem Emergency Committee.
