= Zion Square refrigerator bombing =

1975 bombing by Palestinian terrorists in Jerusalem

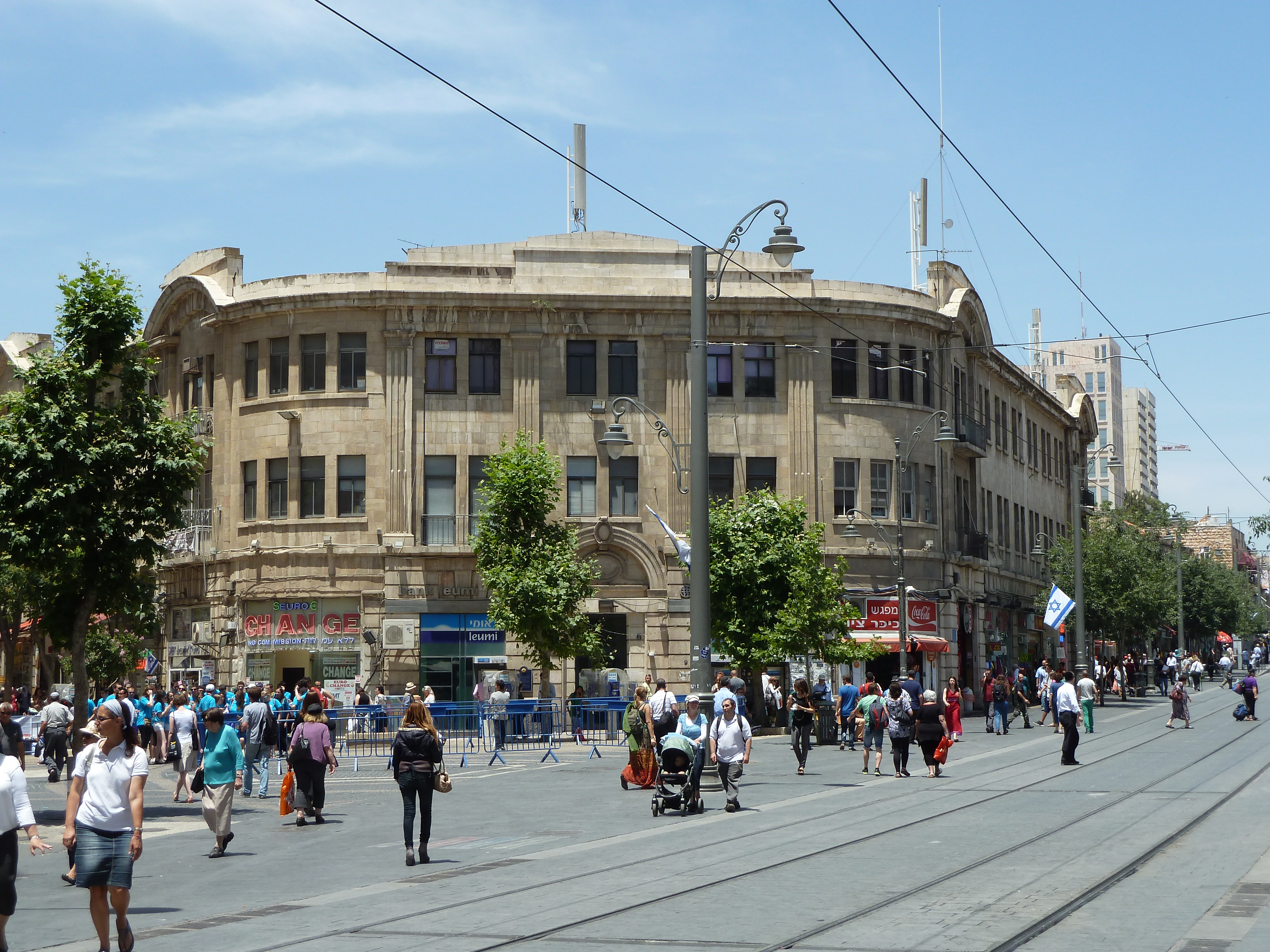
- Kikar Zion

- The attack site
- Native name: פיגוע מקרר התופת בכיכר ציון
- Location: 31°46′55″N 35°13′10″E; Jerusalem
- Date: July 4, 1975; 51 years ago c. 10:00 am
- Attack type: Bombing
- Weapon: 5 kilograms (11 lb) explosive device
- Deaths: 15
- Injuries: 77
- Perpetrator: PLO claimed responsibility
- Assailant: Ahmed Jabara

The Zion Square refrigerator bombing was a terrorist attack carried out in Zion Square, Jerusalem on July 4, 1975. A Palestinian exploded a booby-trapped refrigerator which contained 5 kilograms (11 lb) of explosives inside an appliance store, killing 15 civilians and wounding 77.

== The attack ==
A Jewish passerby, Shabtai Levi, helped a Palestinian man bring a booby-trapped refrigerator into an appliance store at Zion Square in the center of Jerusalem. The refrigerator aroused the suspicions of Esther Landner and Yehuda Warshovsky, who worked near Zion Square. Landner called the police but as she was answering their questions, the refrigerator blew up.

=== Fatalities ===
Among the dead were Rivka ("Ribbie") (née Soifer) Ben-Yitzhak, 35, an American citizen, and her husband, Michael, who left behind two small children. The Ben-Yitzhak Award, presented annually to an outstanding children's book illustrator by the Israel Museum, was established in their memory. Daoud Khoury, an Arab accountant at the King David Hotel, was also killed in the attack.

== Perpetrators ==
Palestinian militant group PLO claimed responsibility for the attack. Later on it was revealed that the attack was executed by the Arab-American Ahmed Jabara, aka Abu Sukar, who originated from Turmus Ayya. Jabara was assisted by Bassem Tabila of Nablus, who fled to Jordan before he could be arrested.

Following an investigation by Shin Bet and the Israel Police, Jabara was arrested and put on trial before a military court in June 1977. He was convicted and sentenced to life in prison and an additional 30 years.

In 2003, Ahmed Jabara was released from prison after having served 27 years, as a gesture of the Israeli government toward Yasser Arafat. Shortly after his release, Jabara called for the kidnapping of Israeli soldiers at a rally in Bethlehem that was widely covered by the Palestinian media. Arafat subsequently appointed him adviser on prisoner affairs. Jabara died of a heart attack in Ramallah on July 17, 2013, at age 78.

== See also ==
- Palestinian political violence
- Israeli–Palestinian conflict
