= The Jerusalem Cinematheque's Israel Film Archive =

The Israel Film Archive, which operates as part of the Jerusalem Cinematheque, is a public archive entrusted with the task of preserving the country's audiovisual heritage through the ages.

As it stands, it is Israel's single largest archive, housing upwards of 12,000 original copies of local documentary and narrative film footage, and over 32,000 reels of film screener copies from Israel and abroad. In total, the archive's various collections add up to over 4,000 hours’ worth of original Israel and Jewish works from the late 19th century through to the present day, including some copies that are the only ones in existence.

== History ==
The Israel Film Archive was founded in 1963 by the late Lia van Leer. Once established, it soon joined the International Federation of Film Archives (FIAF).

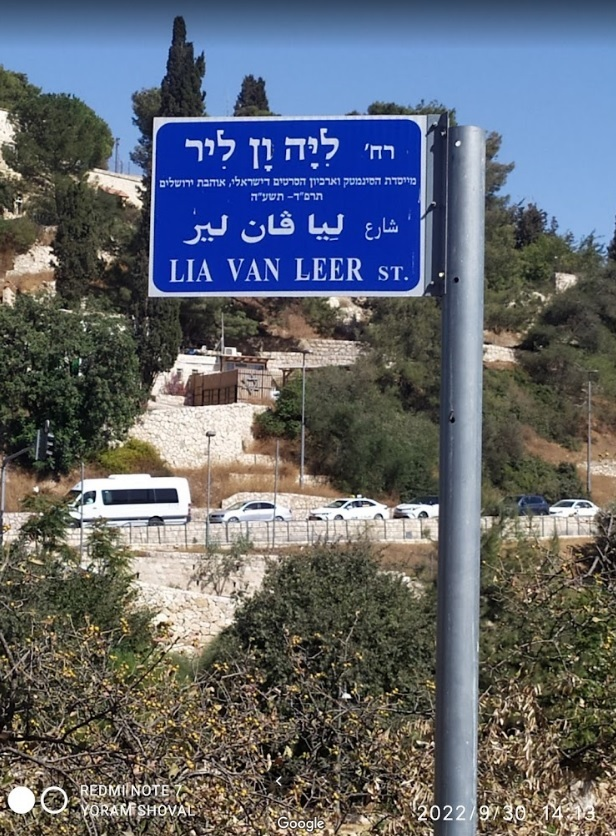
Lia Van Leer street sign, next to the Jerusalem Cinematheque

In its early days, the archive operated out of van Leer's Haifa home. In 1973, a permanent headquarters was established in Jerusalem's Agron House (‘Beit Agron’), which is also the Jerusalem Cinematheque's former residence. In 1984, the cinematheque and archive relocated to its current location on the Hebron Rd.

In 1999, the Israeli parliament (the Knesset) passed the Film Act, according to which producer(s) of any film funded by one of the country's various film funds are mandated to share a copy of the finished work with a public archive. As such, the Israel Film Archive is the primary institution that houses original Israeli film works.

In 2016, the archive team launched a far-reaching digitisation scheme to digitally preserve thousands of films and make them widely accessible for online streaming. In 2020 the Israel Film Archive website was launched, presenting historical footage and documentary film. To date, the website has made upwards of 10,000 archival footage clips, and well over 500 films readily accessible. Some of the content is pay-per-view.

== Roles ==
The archive's primary roles consist of the following:

- The analogue preservation of film footage (of various types including 16mm, 35mm, Beta tapes, U-matic, etc.)
- Digitally preserving films produced in Israel.
- Making the country's local Israeli and pre-Israeli audiovisual heritage widely accessible to the general public.
- Assisting researchers with tracking down footage and various materials for studies, and for the production of films and TV programmes.
- Locating and facilitating the return of Israeli productions’ original film negatives, long since filed away in Israeli or overseas film labs.
- Commissioning and producing digital restorations of select films.
- Lending out copies of film screeners from its collection to festivals and cinematheques, both in Israel and overseas.

== Collections ==
The following are the historical and cultural heritage collections whose ongoing maintenance and public accessibility the archive has been entrusted with:

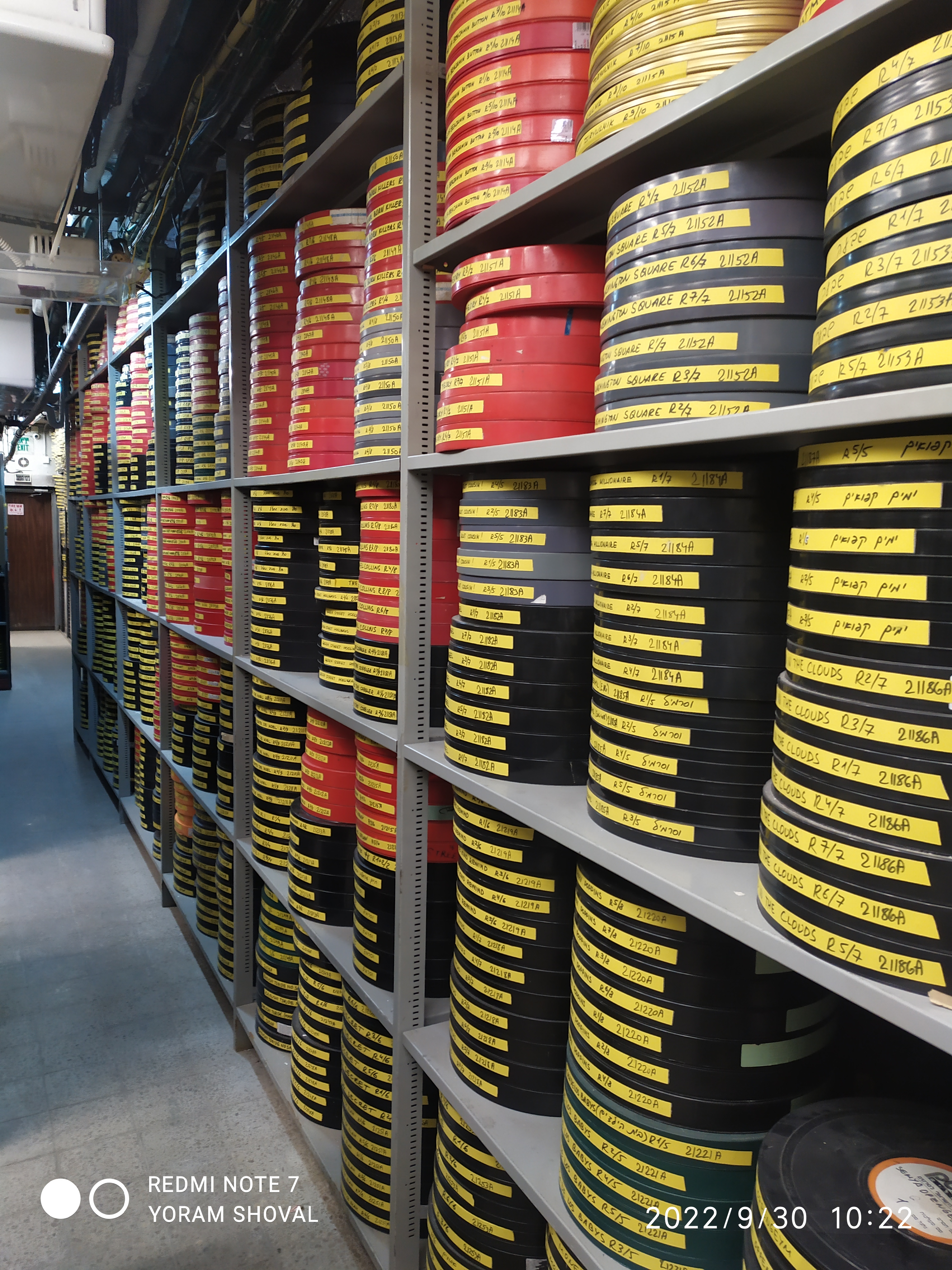
Celluloid Film Reels at the Archive

- The Israel Film Service Collection (1954-1991)

Highlights of the footage in this collection include the capturing of the Western Wall during the 1967 Six-Day War, civilian and cultural public infomercials, the 1968 IDF Parade, Alfred Hitchcock's visit to Jerusalem, the draining of the Hula Valley swampland, the Independence Day reels, visits from various foreign leaders to Israel, tech education, artists’ portraits, and discovering oil in Israel.

- The Nathan Axelrod Newsreel Collection, the Moledet and Carmel Newsreels (1927-1958)

The collection includes hundreds of video newsreels featuring a host of individuals, events, and locations during the State of Israel's formative years. The historical collection features historic footage from the Knesset's inaugural session, demonstrations against the Reparations Agreement [between Israel and Federal Republic of Germany], the visit of the Anglo-American Committee of Enquiry Regarding the Problems of European Jewry and Palestine, and footage of the IDF's first air force pilot training course.

- The Carmel Herzliya Newsreel Collection

Featuring both the Carmel-Herzliya and Geva Reels – a collection of black & white newsreels that were regularly shown in Israeli cinemas, bringing filmgoers all the country's then-current affairs in real time. The newsreels were shown intermittently from the early 1950s through to 1971.

- The Yad Tabenkin Archive (1940-1950)

Featuring footage of the establishing of kibbutzim across the country and daily kibbutz life, along with a number of conferences held by the kibbutz movement.

- The Lavon Institute Archive

The Pinchas Lavon Institute for Labour Movement Research archive features footage of workers’ various campaigns and protests, the founding of towns and industrial cities, and numerous Israeli trade union (Histadrut) leaders.

- The Sherman Grinberg Film Library Collection

Featuring a variety of US newsreels with coverage and footage of a nascent Israel, and pre-Israel Palestine times.

- The WIZO Collection (1936-1985)

Featuring WIZO's (Women's International Zionist Organisation) historical film collection. The collection explores this all-female volunteer movement's rich and diverse body of work since its inception in 1920s London, through the years of British Mandatory rule of Palestine, all the way to the mid-1980s.

- The Ghetto Fighters’ House Collection

Featuring footage chronicling the Jewish Holocaust across Europe, recorded Jewish resistance, and the campaign to bring Holocaust survivors to the future State of Israel (then-British Mandatory Palestine).

- The Joan Sourasky-Constantiner Holocaust Multimedia Research Centre Film Collection

Featuring footage of a class visit to the Theresienstadt Concentration Camp, a day at a concentration camp, and footage from additional camps including Auschwitz, Bergen-Belsen, etc.

- The Naan Studio Collection

Featuring the kibbutz movement's film studio collection, and the United Kibbutz reels.

- The British and Serbian Pilgrim Film Collection

Featuring preserved early 20th century footage of the land.

- The Family Home Video Archive

Featuring multiple private collections that capture Israeli life from a more personal, intimate angle, from the 1930s through to the 1970s.

- An Israeli Documentary Film Collection

Featuring both indie and film fund-backed productions dating back to the establishing of the State of Israel through to the present day.

- An Israeli Narrative Film Collection

Featuring a whopping 98 percent of all narrative fiction films produced in Israel (and locally, pre-Israel) from 1932 through to the present day.

- Student Film Collection

Featuring a selection of films made at the Sam Spiegel Film and Television School, Tel Aviv University's Department of Film and Television Studies, the Beit Zvi School for the Performing Arts, and various other academic institutions.

- The Batsheva Dance Company Archive

Featuring rehearsal and concert footage of the dance company from the 1970s and 1980s.

- The Gurit Kadman Folk Dance Film Collection'(1950-1960)

Featuring footage of various folk dances performed by Jewish immigrants from Kurdistan, Kochi (aka Cochin), Morocco, the Libyan Desert, and Atlas Mountains.

== Media and preservation (digitisation) ==
The vast majority of the Israel Film Archive's collections – around 4,000 hours’ worth of footage on two million metres (6.5 million ft) of film – are made up of analogue films, none of which are available for streaming to the general public. Since its creation, the Archive has been working to preserve and restore Israeli film classics dating back to the 1950s.

In 2016, the Israel Film Archive announced a digitisation scheme whose primary goal was to make thousands of films available for online streaming. The project's number one aim was to preserve all assets of Israel's audiovisual heritage for posterity, and to make them available to a wide range of audiences – from scholars, filmmakers, and other industry professionals to the general public. The scheme's initial five years were awarded a ILS 25m budget.

In August 2020, the archive launched an online digital platform which gave the general public access to hundreds of Israeli films, scanned in exceptionally high resolution. The platform comprises a historical section featuring thousands of documentary footage clips of local life scenes from as far back as pre-Israel ‘Yishuv’ times, and an artistic section featuring hundreds of narrative and documentary shorts and feature films.

The team behind the platform included Dr. Noa Regev who, at the time the scheme began, was acting CEO of the Jerusalem Cinematheque; Archive Director Meir Russo; Digital Archive Director Hila Abraham; Director of Online Public Access Hilla Shitrit; IT Director Hadar Miller; and graphic and web designer Michael Golan. Marat Parkhomovsky served as the project's Director of Content until November 2019. Archive directors, past and present, include: Tzach Levy, Zur Wahab, and Meir Russo (present-day).

=== Stages ===
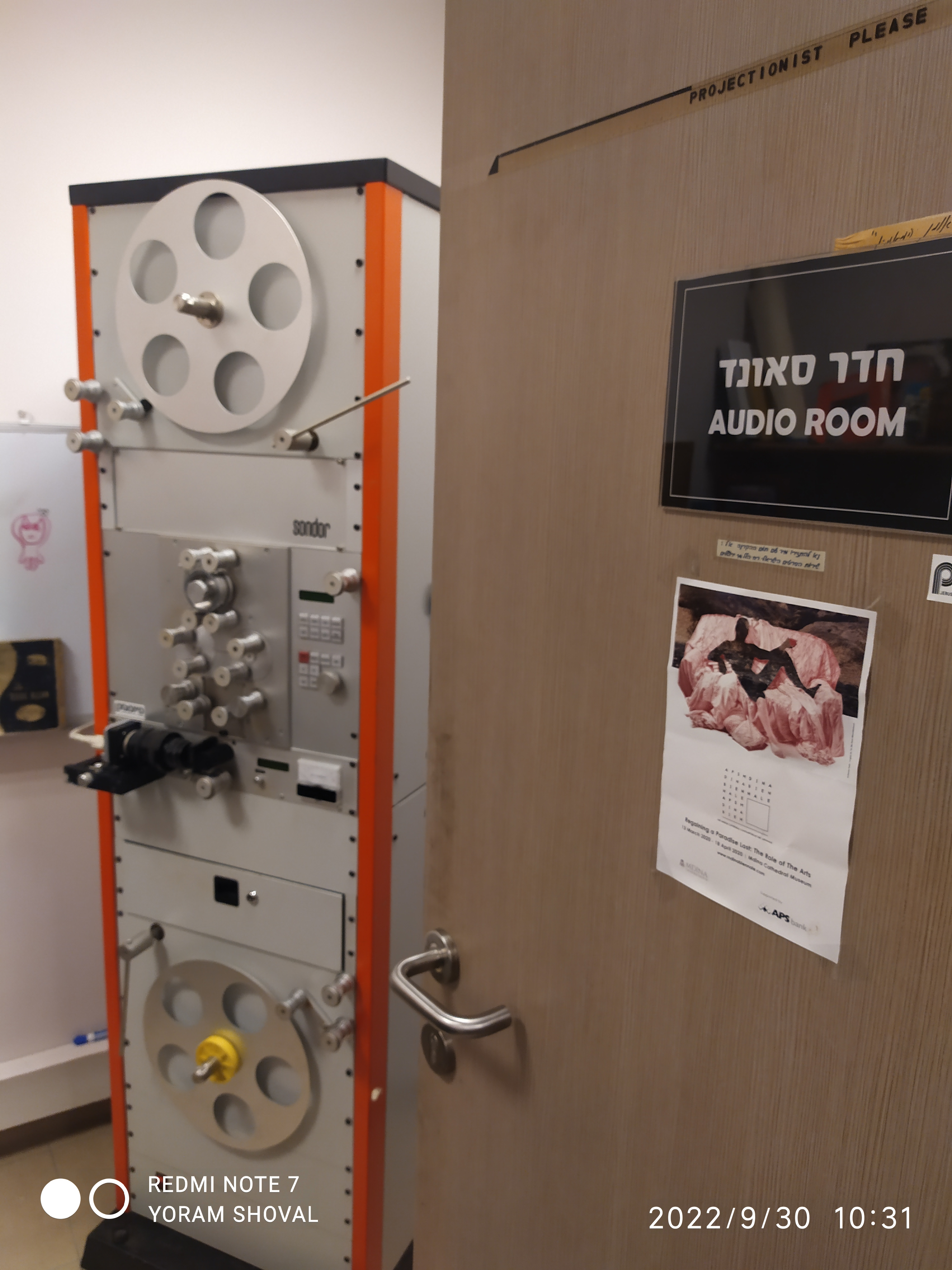
The Archive's digitisation labs

- Establishing Israel's first-of-their-kind scanning facilities

In 2017, the archive launched its very own professional, premium quality film digitisation lab. The scanning operation then officially began with films and footage, initially from the earliest decades of filmmaking (select films shot between 1895 and 1955).

- Setting up digital preservation operations

The system combines the storage and management of media assets, as well as automated system checks that verify the integrity of all digital files.

- Setting up research and cataloguing operations

Every file undergoes historical research during which locations, individuals, and themes are identified and tagged for search and locating purposes.

- Setting up the online access platform

Including the creation and launch of an online video streaming service, and a user-friendly search engine suitable for various audiences. Online access operations also extend to legal dealings with rightsholders and intellectual property owners.

== Highlights of the Archive’s Treasure Troves ==
- The Early Days of Rosh Pina, 1913
- The Orchard Industry in Eretz Israel, 1920
- Hapoel Excursion to the Dead Sea, 1939
