= Mamilla Cemetery =

Muslim cemetery in Jerusalem

Coordinates: 31°46′41″N 35°13′14″E

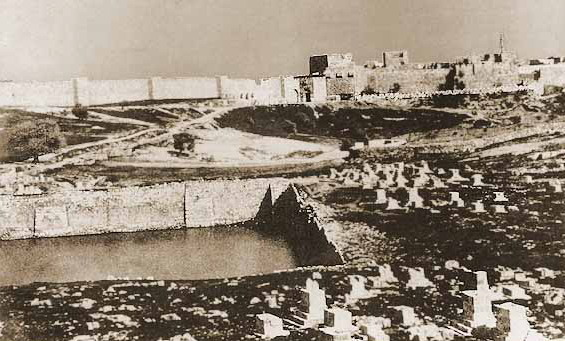
The Mamilla Pool and southern portion of the cemetery in the 19th century

Mamilla Cemetery, sometimes called Ma'aman Allah Cemetery (Arabic: مقبرة مأمن الله), is a historic Muslim cemetery in West Jerusalem that dates back to the Crusades, and lies just to the west of the north-west corner of the walls of the Old City of Jerusalem, near the New Gate. The cemetery, at the center of which lies the Mamilla Pool, contains the remains of figures from the early Islamic period, several Sufi shrines and Mamluk-era tombs. The cemetery grounds also contain the bodies of thousands of Christians killed in the pre-Islamic era, as well as several tombs from the time of the Crusades.

Its identity as an Islamic cemetery is noted by Arab and Persian writers as early as the 11th century, and it has been characterized as "the largest and most important Muslim cemetery in all of Palestine". It was used as a burial site up until 1927 when the Supreme Muslim Council decided to preserve it as a historic site. Following the 1948 Arab–Israeli War, the cemetery and other waqf properties in West Jerusalem fell under the control of Israeli governmental bodies. The Israeli Ministry of Religious Affairs stated in 1948 that the cemetery is: "one of the most prominent Muslim cemeteries, where seventy thousand Muslim warriors of [Saladin’s] armies are interred along with many Muslim scholars... Israel, will always know to protect and respect this site."

A number of buildings, a road and other public facilities, such as a park, a parking lot and public lavatories have since been constructed on the cemetery grounds, destroying grave markers and tombs. A plan to build a Museum of Tolerance on part of the cemetery grounds, announced in 2004, aroused much controversy and faced several stop work orders before being given final approval in July 2011.

== Name ==
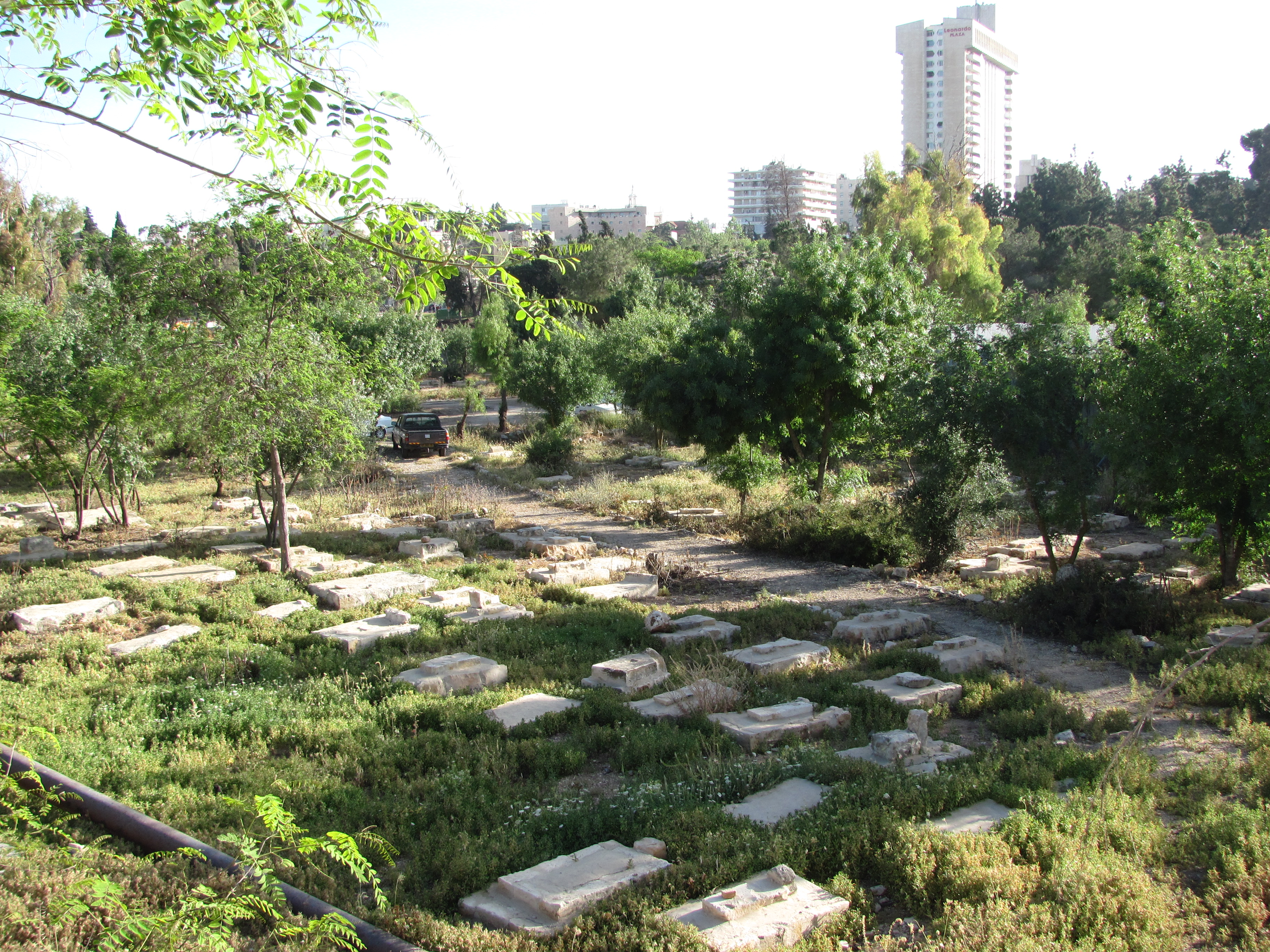
Partial view of Mamilla Cemetery

The cemetery shares its name with the Mamilla Pool, located at its center. A church dedicated to "St Mamilla" was located at the same site in the early Byzantine and Islamic periods.

Vincent and Abel (1922), supported by Pringle (2007), see it as plausible that a Byzantine-period pious woman by the Latin name of Mamilla sponsored the construction of a pool connected to the Patriarch's Pool next to the Church of the Resurrection, and that she became venerated as a saint to whom a church was dedicated next to her pool. They see it as more likely that the church was named after the pool than the other way around.

=== Muslim popular etymologies ===
Mamilla is mentioned as an Islamic cemetery as early as the 11th century in Concerning the (religious) status of Jerusalem, a treatise penned by Abu Bakr b. Muhammad b. Ahmad b. Muhammad al-Wasiti, the preacher of Al Aqsa Mosque in 1019–1020 (AH 410). He gives its name as zaytun al-milla, Arabic for "the olive trees of the religion", which Moshe Gil says was "a commonly used distortion of the name Māmillā," along with bab al-milla (meaning, "the door of the religion").

Abd al-Ghani al-Nabulsi writes in al-Haqiqa, based on his travels to the region in 1693–1694, that, "It is said that its original name is Ma'man Illah and sometimes it was called Bab Illah [Gate to God]. It is also called 'Zeitun il-Milla'. Its name, according to the Jews, is Beit Milo and to the Christians, Babilla. But it is known to the common people as Mamilla." A similar description appears in James Turner Barclay's The City of the Great King (1857) and he gives the meaning of Ma'man Illah (or Ma-min-ullah, as he transcribes it) as "What is from God!"

== History ==
=== Byzantine period ===
During the Byzantine period in Palestine (c. 4th–early 7th centuries), a church dedicated to St Mamilla was established on the same site and it appears to have been used for burials at this time as well. A rather biased account of the aftermath of the Persian capture of Jerusalem in 614 by Strategius, a monk of Mar Saba, says that the bodies of thousands of Christians killed as a result of the Persian siege – 4,518 according to Georgian translations of the lost Greek original, and 24,518 according to Arabic translations of the same – were found in the Mamilla Pool and buried in caves in and around it.

=== Early Islamic period ===
Islamic rule over Jerusalem began in 638 under the Rashidun Caliphate and persisted for some 1,400 years, interrupted only by the periods of Crusader rule between 1099 and 1187 and between 1229 and 1244. Throughout much of this period, Mamilla cemetery was the largest Islamic cemetery in the city, containing the remains of emirs, muftis, Arab and Sufi mystics, soldiers of Saladin and numerous Jerusalem notables. The cemetery is said to be the burial site of several of the first Muslims, the Sahabah, companions or disciples of Muhammad, the prophet of Islam. In 1945, The Palestine Post said it covered an area of over 450 dunams (111 acres), while Haaretz in 2010 said that at its peak, it covered an area of 200 dunams (some 50 acres). A 1938 deed issued by the British mandatory authorities to the Islamic waqf outlined the size of the plot as 134.5 dunams (33 acres).

Religious warriors or mujahideen who died in the battles for control over Jerusalem with the Byzantines in 636 and the Crusaders in 1137 were buried in the cemetery, including, according to tradition, some 70,000 soldiers of Saladin. The Church of St Mamilla was still standing in the 9th century when Palestine was under the rule of the Abbasid Empire; it is listed in the Commemoratorium De Casis Dei (c. 808) as one of the properties for which the Jerusalem Patriarch paid the Arabs taxes, and is described by Bernard the Monk as lying about a mile west of Jerusalem (c. 870).

The cemetery is mentioned by Arab and Persian authors under its various names throughout the ages (see above). In 1020, al-Wasiti writes that the Muslim cemetery situated in zaytun al-milla and outlines the advantages of being buried in Jerusalem. Ibn al-Adim, the Syrian historian, recounts visiting the cemetery several times, and on one visit in 1239–40 recalls going to the graves of Rabi' al-Mardini (d. 1205–1206), a shaykh from Mardin renowned for performing miracles, and al-'Iwaqi (d. 1232), a pious Sufi who lived in the compound of al-Aqsa mosque. Al-Adim describes the grave of the former as housed in a prominent mausoleum with other pious individuals.

=== Crusader/Ayyubid period ===
During Crusader rule over Jerusalem, the cemetery appears to have once again served as a burial place for Christians. Charles Simon Clermont-Ganneau, the French archaeologist, described and sketched several Frankish sarcophagi that were in the cemetery in the 19th century, most of which were destroyed in 1955 (see below).

Al-Quraishi, a famous Sufi mystic said to have had miraculous healing powers, immigrated to Jerusalem from Andulasia by way of Fustat and garnered a school of disciples in his new home that numbered some 600 people before his death and burial in 1194.

=== Mamluk period ===
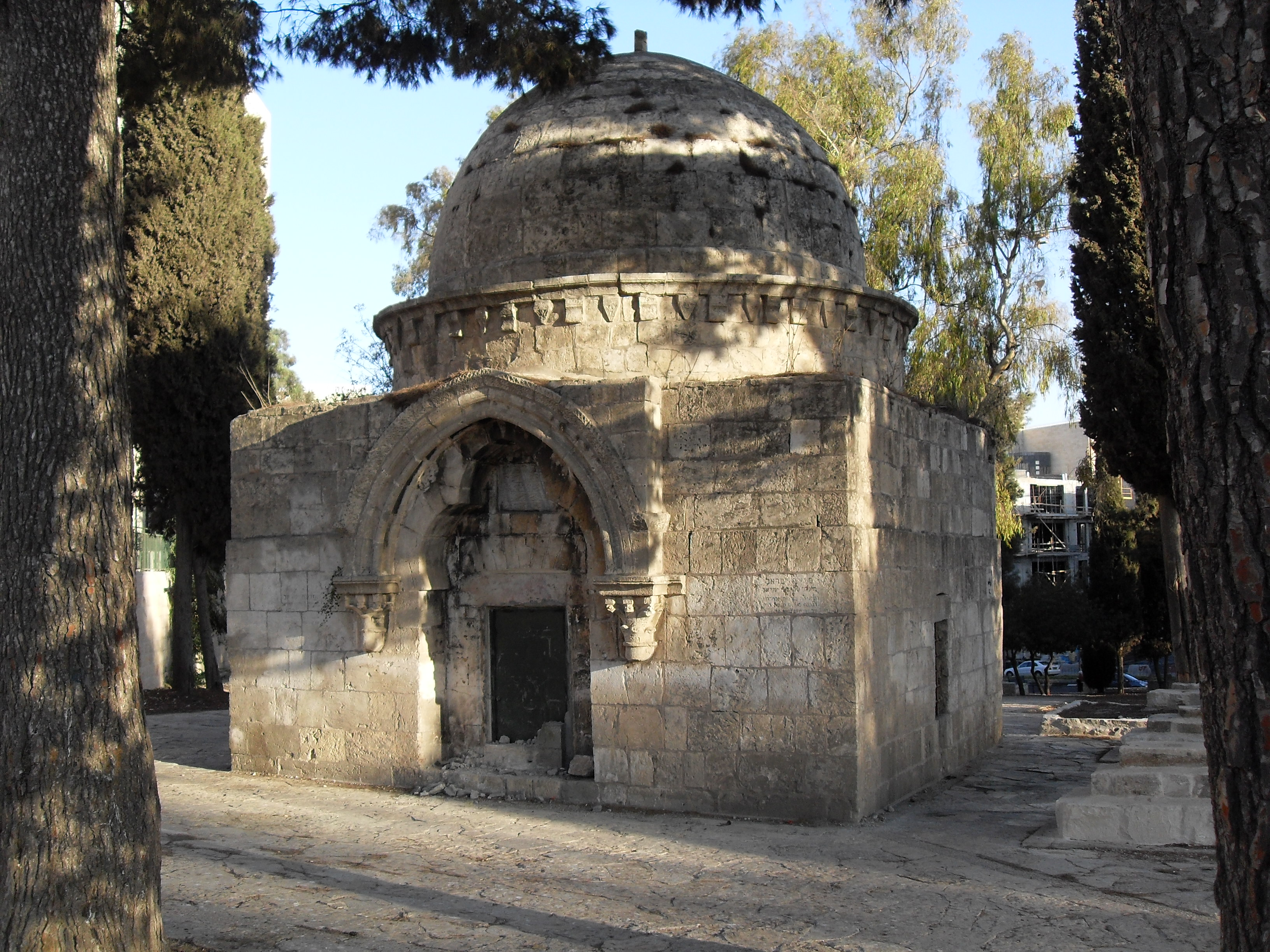
Tomb of Mamluk emir Aidughdi Kubaki

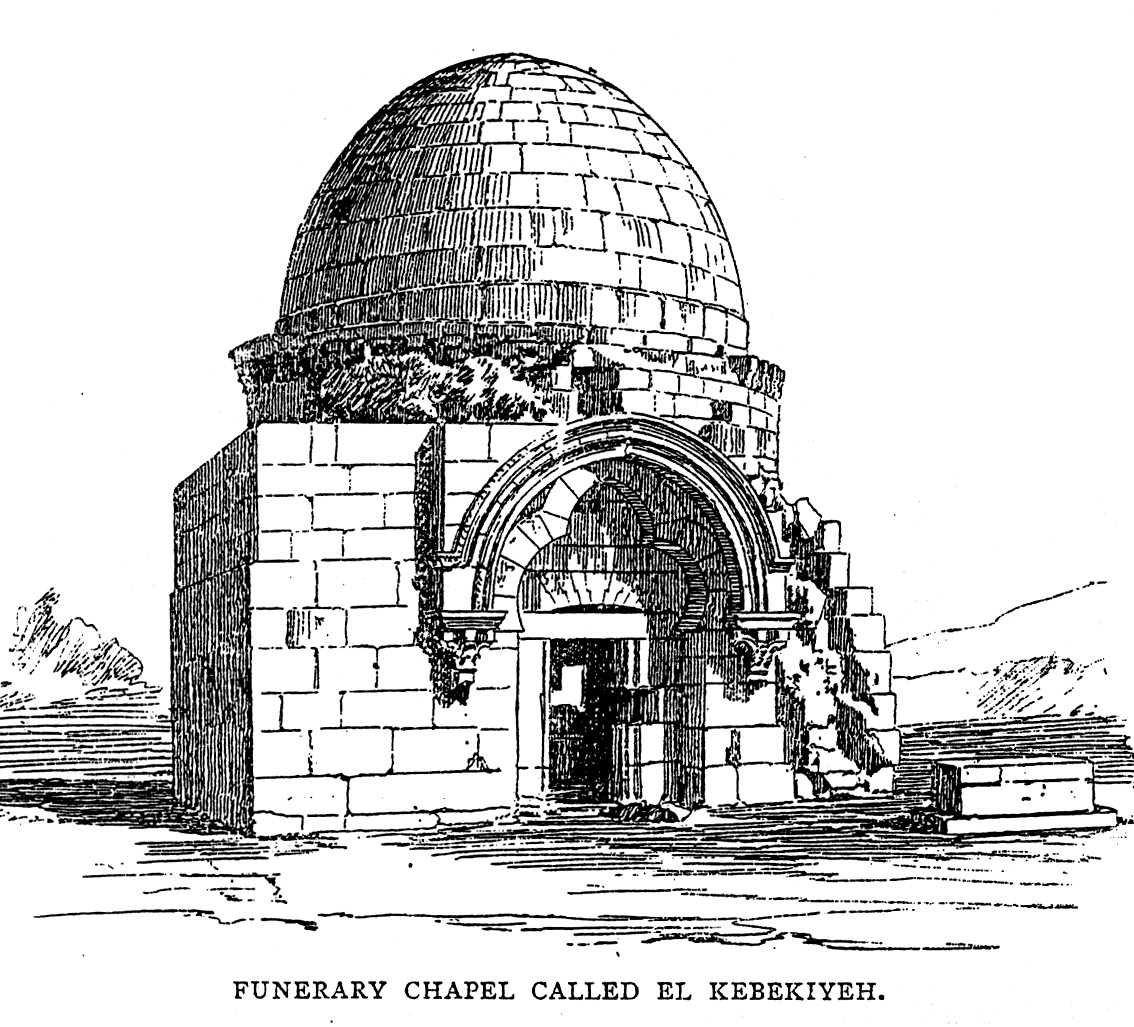
Sketch of the Kebekiyeh where emir Aidughdi Kubaki was interred in 1289

During the period of Mamluk rule (c. 12th–15th centuries), most of the area's notable citizens were buried in Mamilla. A structure known as al-Kebekiyeh (or Zawiya Kubakiyya), a one-room square-shaped building covered with a dome and incorporating architectural materials from the Crusader era was built during this period. It is identified as the tomb of emir Aidughdi Kubaki, a Syrian slave who rose to prominence as the governor of Safed and Aleppo, before his death in 1289.

In the 14th century work A'lam, a collection of traditions on the value of prayer in Jerusalem, al-Zarkashi says those buried in the city will avoid fitnat al qabr or "purgatory of the tomb," and for those buried in zaytun al-milla itself, it would be as if they were buried in heaven.

Ibn Arslan, who was buried alongside Al-Quraishi (d. 1194) some two and a half centuries after the Ayyubid-period Sufi master, was a charismatic Sufi shaykh whom Muslims from surrounding countries came to visit.

Mujir al-Din al-'Ulaymi in al-Uns al-Jalil (c. 1496) says, "Who ever invokes God's name while standing between the graves of Ibn Arslān and al-Quraishī [in Māmilā cemetery], God will grant all his wishes."

Other notables buried in Mamilla and recalled by Mujir al-Din include two founders of zawiyas in Jerusalem – Nasr ed-din Mohammad, one of the "ten emirs of Gaza", and Shaykh 'Omar, a Moroccan of the Masmoudys, El Modjarrad tribe. Also named are several emirs, including Ruq ed-din Mankouros, the imperial lieutenant of the Jerusalem Citadel (d. AH 717), Abu el-Qasim, the governor of Nablus and custodian of Jerusalem and Hebron (d. AH 760), and Nasser ed-din Mohammad, custodian of the two Haram al-Sharifs (Holy Mosques) of al-Aqsa in Jerusalem and al-Ibrahimi in Hebron (d. AH 828), among others.

=== Ottoman period ===
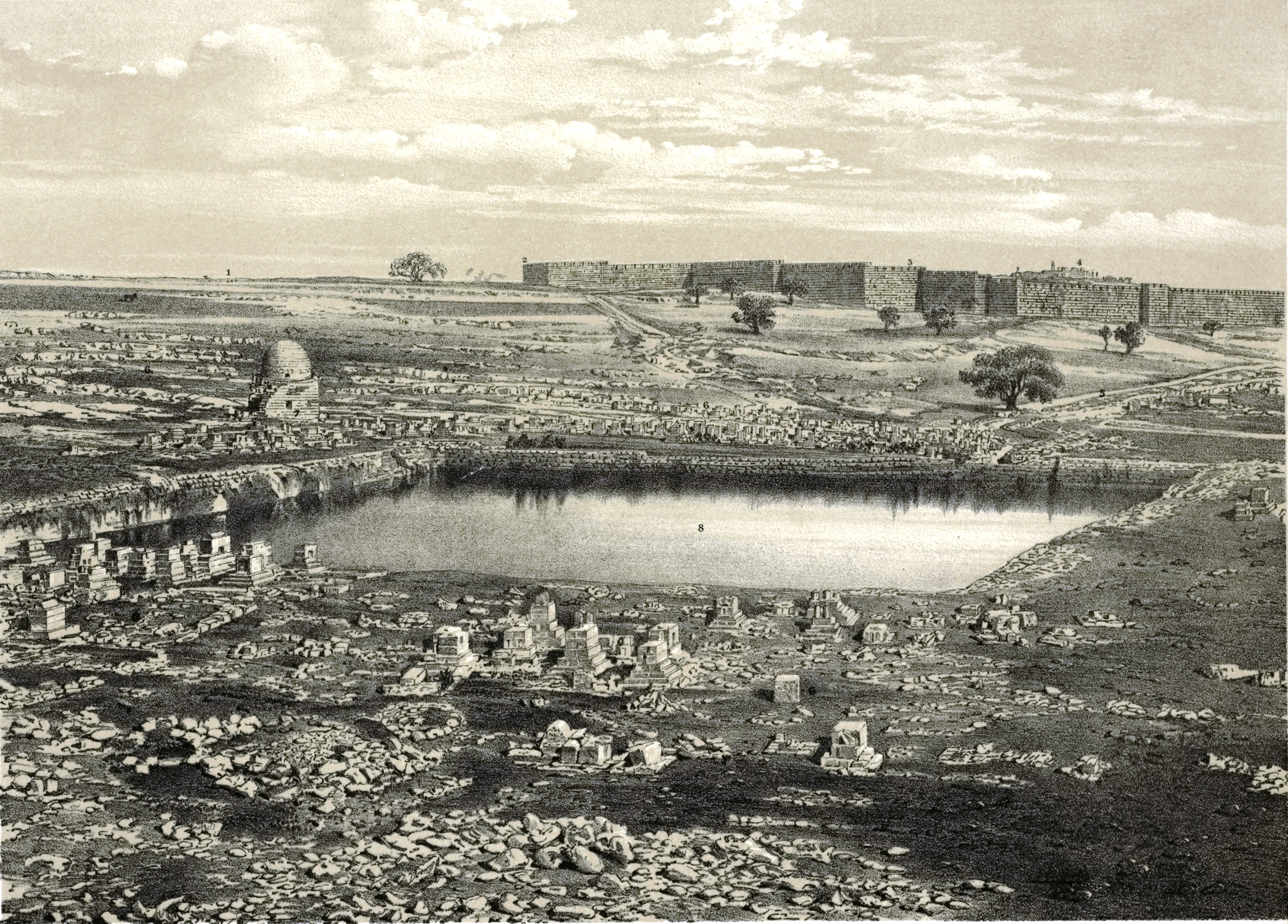
Pool and cemetery of Mamilla, 1864.

During the period of Ottoman imperial rule from the early 16th to early 20th centuries, the cemetery continued to serve as a burial site, and in 1847, it was demarcated by a 2-meter-high (6.6 ft) fence. By the 1860s, the borders of the cemetery were delineated from the by then encroaching urban development by a wall and surrounding road.

=== Mandatory Palestine period ===
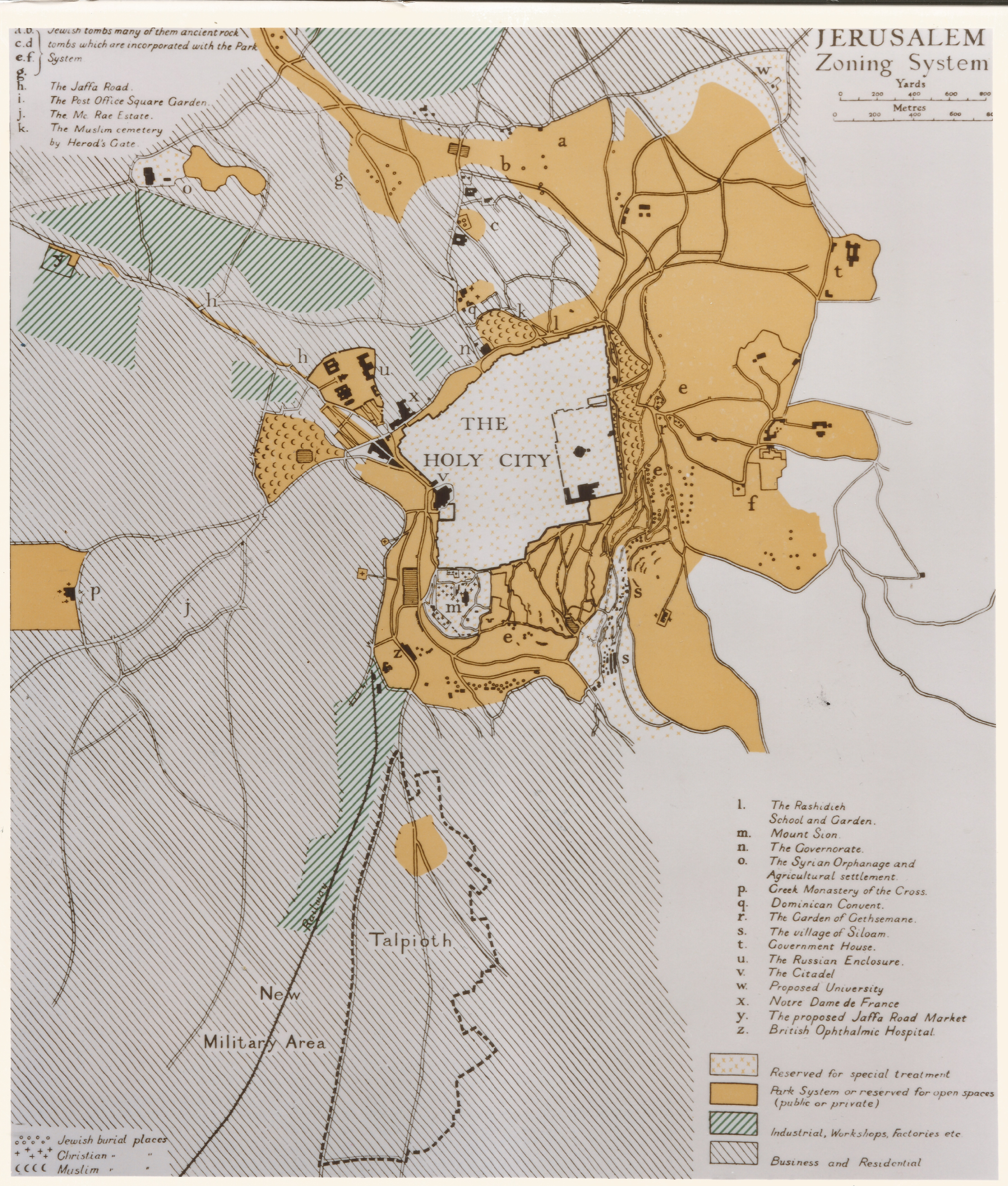
Ashbee 1921 Zonning plan for Jerusalem. Mamilla Cemetery with its pool is shown directly west of the west corner of the old city.

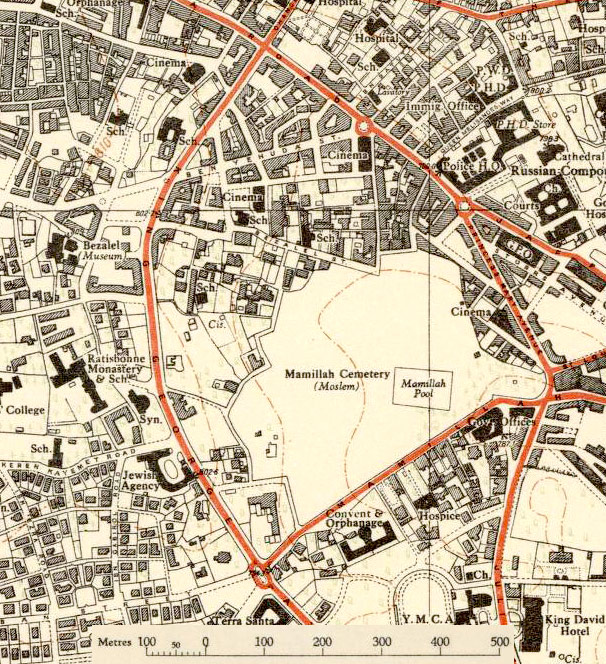
The "Mamillah" district of Jerusalem in 1946, including the "Mamillah Cemetery (Moslem)" and the "Mamillah Pool".

Burials in the cemetery ceased early in the period of British rule over Mandate Palestine (1918–1948), following the 1927 decision by the Supreme Muslim Council, who oversaw the administration of waqf properties, to preserve it as a historic site. By this decision, the cemetery, its tombs, and its grounds were maintained.

In 1929, Mohammad Amin al-Husayni, the Mufti of Jerusalem, decided to build the Palace Hotel on what was assumed to be outside the border of the cemetery. While the foundations were being laid, Arab workers uncovered Muslim graves. Baruch Katinka, a Jewish contractor hired to oversee the project, wrote in his memoirs that when the Mufti was informed of the discovery, he said to quietly rebury the bones elsewhere, as he feared Raghib al-Nashashibi, his political rival and the mayor of Jerusalem, would issue a cease work order. As Shari'a law permits the transfer of graves in special cases with the approval of a qadi (Muslim judge), Husayni, acting as head of the Supreme Muslim Council, the highest body in charge of Muslim community affairs in Mandate Palestine, authorized the disinterment. When it was discovered what had happened, rival factions filed a suit against Husayni in the Muslim courts, arguing that he had desecrated ancient graves.

The Islamic waqf continued to control the cemetery and in 1944, the cemetery was designated an antiquities site by the British mandatory authorities.

A November 1945 article in The Palestine Post reported on plans of the Supreme Muslim Council (SMC) and the Government Town Planning Adviser to build a commercial center on cemetery grounds and to transfer remains buried in the areas to be developed to a "40 dunams walled reserve" centered around the tomb of al Sayid al Kurashi, ancestor of the Dajani family. A member of the SMC told the newspaper that, "the use of Muslim cemeteries in the public interest had many precedents both in Palestine and elsewhere." The SMC's plan, however, was never implemented.

=== Israel ===
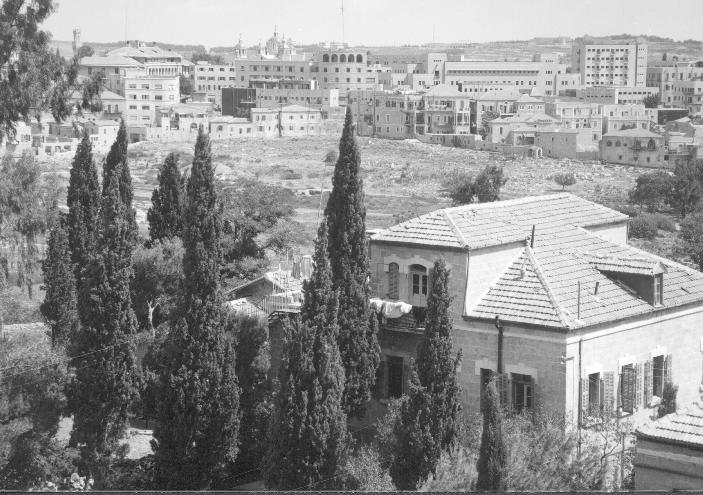
Mamilla graveyard 1948

At the time of Israel's assertion of control over West Jerusalem in 1948, the cemetery, which contained thousands of grave markers, came under the administration of the Israeli Custodian of Absentee Property and the Muslim Affairs Department of Israel's Ministry of Religious Affairs. After the armistice, Israeli authorities destroyed the part of the cemetery closest to the armistice line. Since 1948, the site has been progressively built over with carparks, and partly developed into Independence Park.

By the end of the 1967 war that resulted in the Israeli occupation of East Jerusalem, only a handful of broken grave markers remained standing. A large part of the cemetery was bulldozed and converted into a parking lot in 1964 and a public lavatory was also built on the cemetery grounds.

In the 1950s, the Ministry of Foreign Affairs, sensitive to how the treatment of waqf properties would be viewed internationally, criticized government policy towards the cemetery. A ministry representative described the vandalism to tombstones, including their use by the guard appointed by the Religious Ministry to build a henhouse beside his shelter in the cemetery, and the destruction of ancient tombs by bulldozers cleaning the Mamilla Pool. Noting the site constituted waqf property and lay within sight of the American Consulate, the ministry said it viewed the situation, which included plans for new roads and the parceling out of portions to private landowners as compensation for other properties confiscated by the state, with deep regret.

Israeli authorities bulldozed several tombs in the cemetery, including some of those identified as Frankish by Clermont-Ganneau, to establish Mamilla Park (or Independence Park) in 1955. Two of the largest and finest tombs survived, though the lid of one was overturned when it moved from its original spot. The other is the Mamluk era funerary chapel known as al-Kebekiyeh (or Zawiya Kubakiyya), now located in the eastern end of Independence Park.

Besides Independence Park, other parts of downtown Jerusalem erected on the cemetery grounds include the Experimental School, Agron Street, Beit Agron, and Kikar Hahatulot (Cats' Square), among others. Government buildings on the cemetery grounds include the main headquarters of the Israeli Ministry of Trade and Industry, and the Customs Department building, which is said to be located on what was once the site of the chapel dedicated to St. Mamilla.

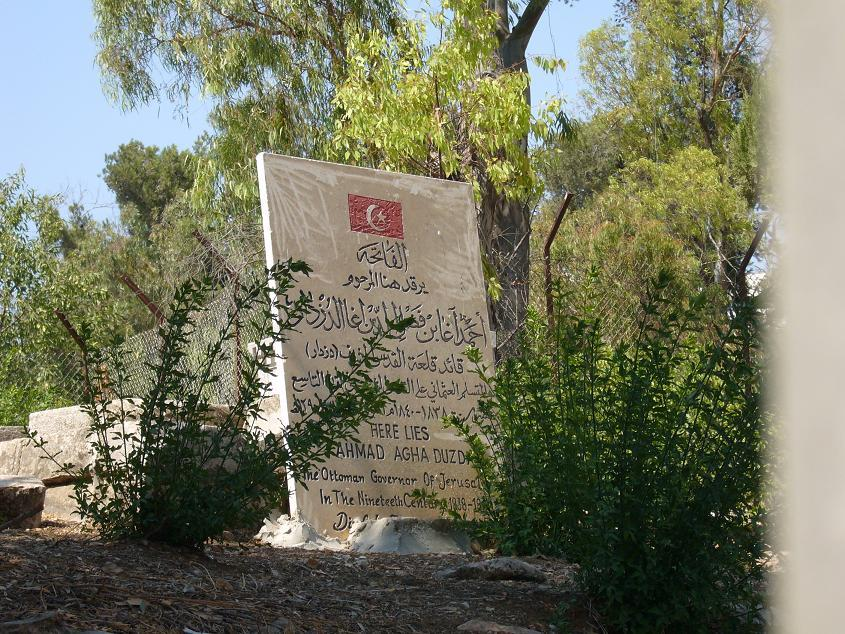
Grave of Ahmad Agha Duzdar, Ottoman governor of Jerusalem (1838-1863), in the southern section of the Mamilla Cemetery. The headstone was refurbished by the Turkish government in consultation with the Waqf in 2005.

In 1992, the Custodian of Absentee Property sold the cemetery grounds to the Jerusalem Municipality, a sale the Mufti of Jerusalem, Ikrema Sabri, said they had no right to make. The Israeli Electricity Company destroyed more tombs on 15 January 2005 in order to lay some cables.

==== Museum of Tolerance controversy ====
In 2004, the Simon Wiesenthal Center (SWC) revealed plans to build a Center for Human Dignity as part of its Museum of Tolerance Jerusalem with a target date for completion in 2009. Frank Gehry was appointed the architect, and the Jerusalem Municipality offered the SWC a 3.5-acre plot in the northern section of the original Mamilla cemetery where the parking lot was built in 1964. Marvin Hier, head of the SWC, said his association was unaware that the site was located on a cemetery and was told by the municipality that the land was owned by the Israel Lands Administration before it was given to the SWC for the project.

During excavations to prepare the ground for construction in 2005–2006, skeletons were found and removed. The Islamic Court, a division of Israel's justice system, issued a temporary ban on work, but work continued anyway. The Al Aqsa Association of the Islamic Movement moved to bring the case before Israel's Supreme Court.

The SWC's plan also elicited considerable outcry from some Israeli academics and archaeologists, and work was stayed several times by the courts. After the Supreme Court rejected the Islamic Movement's petition in October 2008, work resumed. Between November 2008 and April 2009, crews of 40 to 70 people per shift worked in 8-hour stints, 24-hours a day to remove an estimated 1,000 skeletons from the site slated for construction.

In 2010, Marvin Hier, rabbi and founder and dean of the SWC, said "Our opponents would have you believe our bulldozers are preparing to desecrate ancient Muslim tombstones and historic markers. Let me be clear: The Museum of Tolerance is not being built on the Mamilla Cemetery, but on an adjacent 3-acre site where, for a half-century, hundreds of people of all faiths have parked in a three-level underground structure without any protest." Hier also accused opponents of the SWC's building plans of "sheer hypocrisy," noting that the plans of the Supreme Muslim Council to build a commercial center in 1945 was evidence that substantiated the Supreme Court's ruling, "That the Mamilla Cemetery was regarded by many Muslim religious leaders as 'mundras,' or abandoned and without sanctity."

Rashid Khalidi, a professor of Arab studies at Columbia University, said that, "contrary to what Rabbi Hier said, that parking lot was built over a cemetery, part of it. And so, the Israeli authorities are basically pushing ahead with the desecration of a cemetery that they have been, unfortunately, slowly nibbling away at for over three decades. We and other families are taking action as a group of families to try and stop this, after other families failed in the Israeli Supreme Court." He also said that "What they have now done is to dig down and disinter four layers, according to the chief archaeologist for the Israeli Archaeological Authority, four layers of graves. There are more probably beneath those, according to his report, which was suppressed in the submissions to the Israeli Supreme Court."

Gehry resigned from the project in January 2010. A new design for the museum drafted by Chyutin Architects was approved by the city of Jerusalem in June 2011, receiving an official building permit from the Interior Ministry in July 2011.

In October 2011, eighty-four archaeologists called on the Simon Wiesenthal Center, the Jerusalem municipality and the Israel Antiquities Authority to end construction of the Museum of Tolerance. In a letter sent to the three bodies, the archaeologists argued that the establishment of the museum on the site of the Mamilla Muslim cemetery contradicted ethical standards in the archaeological world, as well as Israeli law. "The bulldozing of historic cemeteries is the ultimate act of territorial aggrandizement: the erasure of prior residents," said Professor Harvey Weiss of Yale University, adding that "Desecration of Jerusalem's Mamilla cemetery is a continuing cultural and historical tragedy." The Simon Wiesenthal Center responded that "the arguments in the letter are old, of a mistaken nature and contain factual errors."

==== Other developments ====
Plans to build new buildings to house the Jerusalem Magistrate's Court and the Jerusalem District Court on the cemetery grounds were cancelled by Supreme Court President Dorit Beinisch in January 2010. The decision followed the discovery of human remains at the site, supporting critics' claims that construction in the area was offensive to Muslims.

On 9 August 2010, 300 Muslim gravestones in the cemetery were bulldozed by the Israel Lands Administration (ILA) in an area US Jewish human rights activists said was very close to the planned site for the Museum of Tolerance. A reporter from Agence France Presse witnessed the destruction of 200 graves until the work was briefly suspended while the court heard a stop work petition it rejected, allowing demolitions to continue that same day. The judge later issued an order prohibiting harm to ancient graves and mandating that the ILA coordinate work with the Israel Antiquities Authority and representatives of the Islamic Movement.

The Jerusalem city council issued its first official response in a written statement on 12 August, saying that, "The municipality and the (Israel Lands) Authority destroyed around 300 dummy gravestones which were set up illegally in Independence Park on public land." It said these "fake" gravestones were not erected over any human remains and were placed in the park in an effort to "illegally take over state land."

Mahmud Abu Atta, a spokesman for the Al-Aqsa Foundation, denied the city council's claim that new tombs were added illegally. He said that between 500 and 600 tombs had been renovated in total "with the municipality's agreement," that "some of the tombs had to be totally rebuilt," but that "all the tombs that we built or renovated contain bodies."

Twenty graves were completely destroyed or had their tombstones removed by vandals in January 2011. On the night of 25–26 June 2011, about 100 gravestones in an intact part of the cemetery were destroyed by Israeli bulldozers. Footage filmed by local media and activists appeared on Al Arabiya and Al Jazeera and showed the bulldozers pulling out quickly after realizing they were being filmed; Israeli officials made no comment on the incident.

Later that same year, fifteen gravestones in the cemetery were spray painted red with racist slogans reading "Death to the Arabs", as well as "price tag" and "Givat Asaf", the name of an Israeli outpost slated for demolition. The news was reported in November 2011 by Agence France Presse whose photographer saw the damage. Haaretz reported that the authorities did not know exactly when the vandalism took place, nor who was responsible, An Israeli Police spokeswoman told AFP that "the slogans were painted several weeks ago" and had not yet been erased by municipal authorities.
