= Nathan Axelrod =

Belarusian Israeli filmmaker (1905–1987)

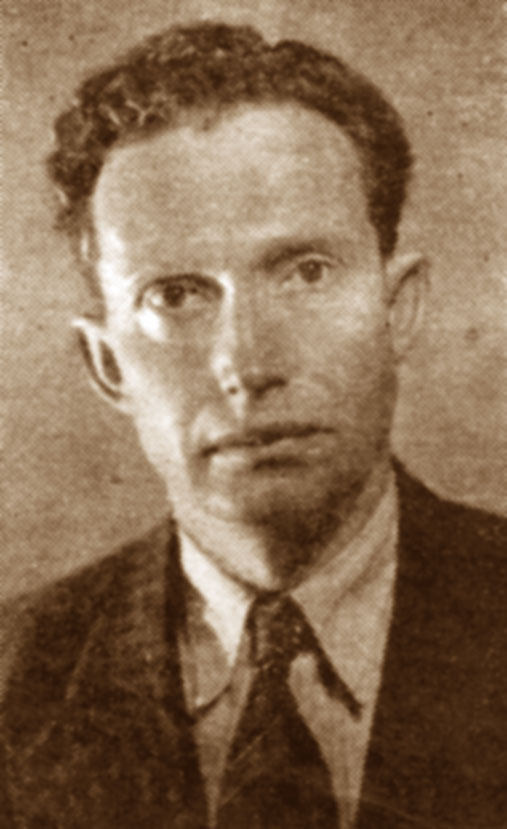
Nathan Axelrod, 1946

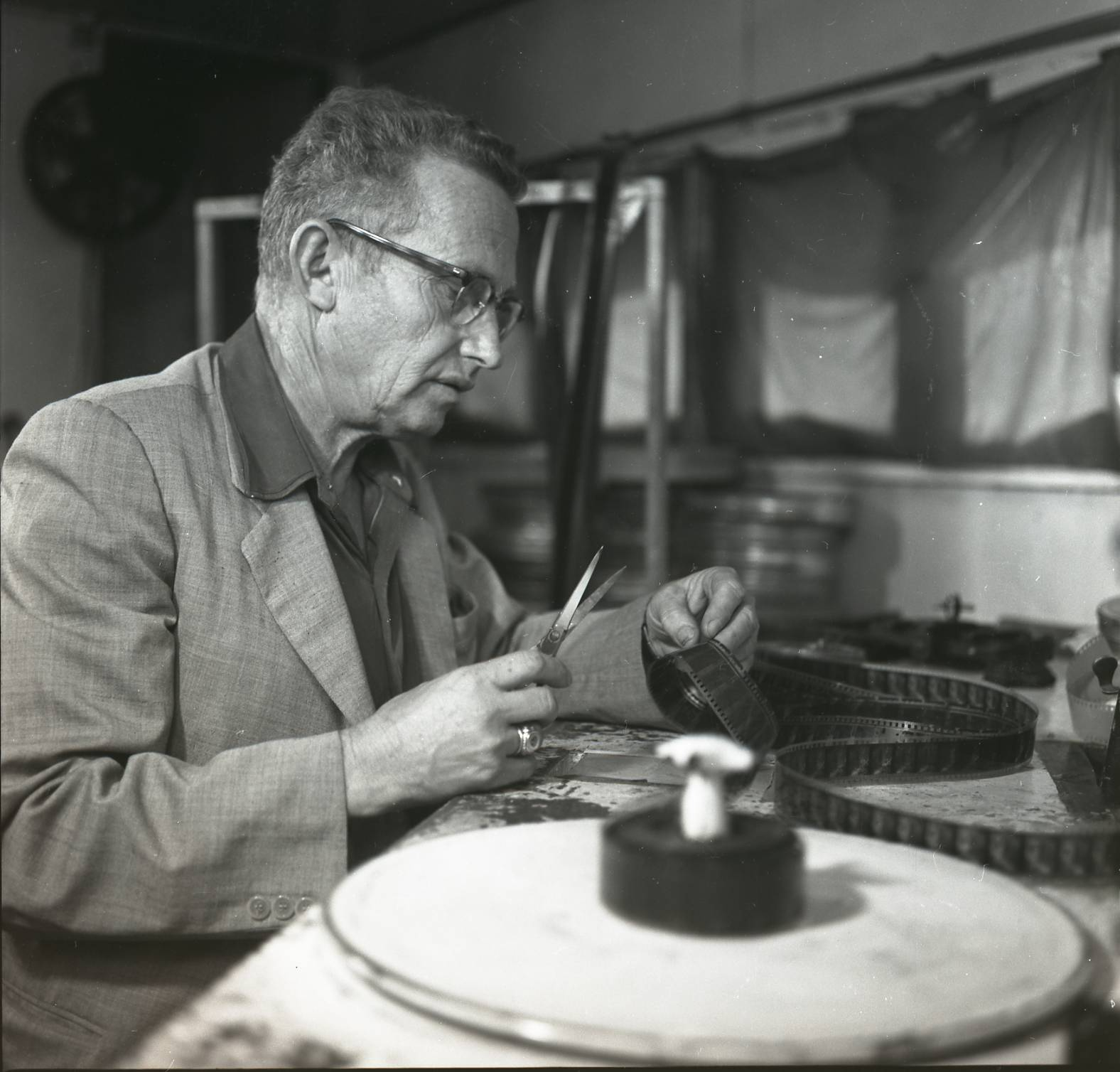
Nathan Axelrod, 1963

Nathan Axelrod (7 April 1905 – 6 October 1987) was a Belarusian and Israeli pioneering filmmaker. He is known for his "Carmel Diary" newsreels he produced for some 30 years, and his feature-length films.

== Life and career ==
Nathan Axelrod was born on 7 April 1905, in Dubrovna, Russian Empire (now Belarus), to a Jewish family. He emigrated to Mandatory Palestine in 1926. He was involved in Zionist activities, and spent time in prison for this.

Axelrod founded the production company Moledat together with Yerushalayim Sega, one of his relatives. By 1935, he shifted his business to new company called Carmel Films. Axelrod's "Carmel Diary" was a news reel "diary" produced for more than thirty years, and was popular within the Hebrew-speaking public. Between 1927 and 1958 he made about 450 newsreels. His Carmel Diary business was created under Herzliya Studios, until he retired from his work in 1956. It continued to be produced without him under the name "Carmel Diary Herzliya".

Axelrod continued his attempts to create feature films while he made newsreels. In 1932, he served as the cinematographer and editor of "Oded the Wanderer", which was the first full-length film produced in the region.

In 1947, he filmed Jewish detainees at Cyprus internment camps in Cyprus.

He and his wife Leah had four sons.

== Death and legacy ==
Axelrod died on 6 October 1987, and was survived by his wife, three sons, and grandchildren.

His granddaughter Naama Axelrod was interviewed about his life by Rotem Pesachovish Paz. Many of his newsreels are preserved as the Nathan Axelrod Newsreel Collection at the Jerusalem Cinematheque's Israel Film Archive.

== Filmography ==
- Oded the Wanderer (1932), as cinematographer and editor
- M'Al Hahuravot / Me’al ha-khoravot (Over the Ruins) (1938), as producer
- Don Quixote and Sa'ad Pancha (Hebrew: דן קישוט וסעדיה פנצ'ו, lit. 'Dan Quihote V'Sa'adia Pansa'; 1956), as producer
- True Story of Palestine (Hebrew: עץ או פלסטיין, romanized: Etz O Palestina; 1962), as director along with Joel Silberg and Uri Zohar
- Girls' Paradise Eilat (1964)

== See also ==
- Cinema of Israel
- List of Israeli films of 1956
- List of Israeli films of 1962
