= Haifa Cinematheque =

Coordinates: 32.80336°N 34.98518°E

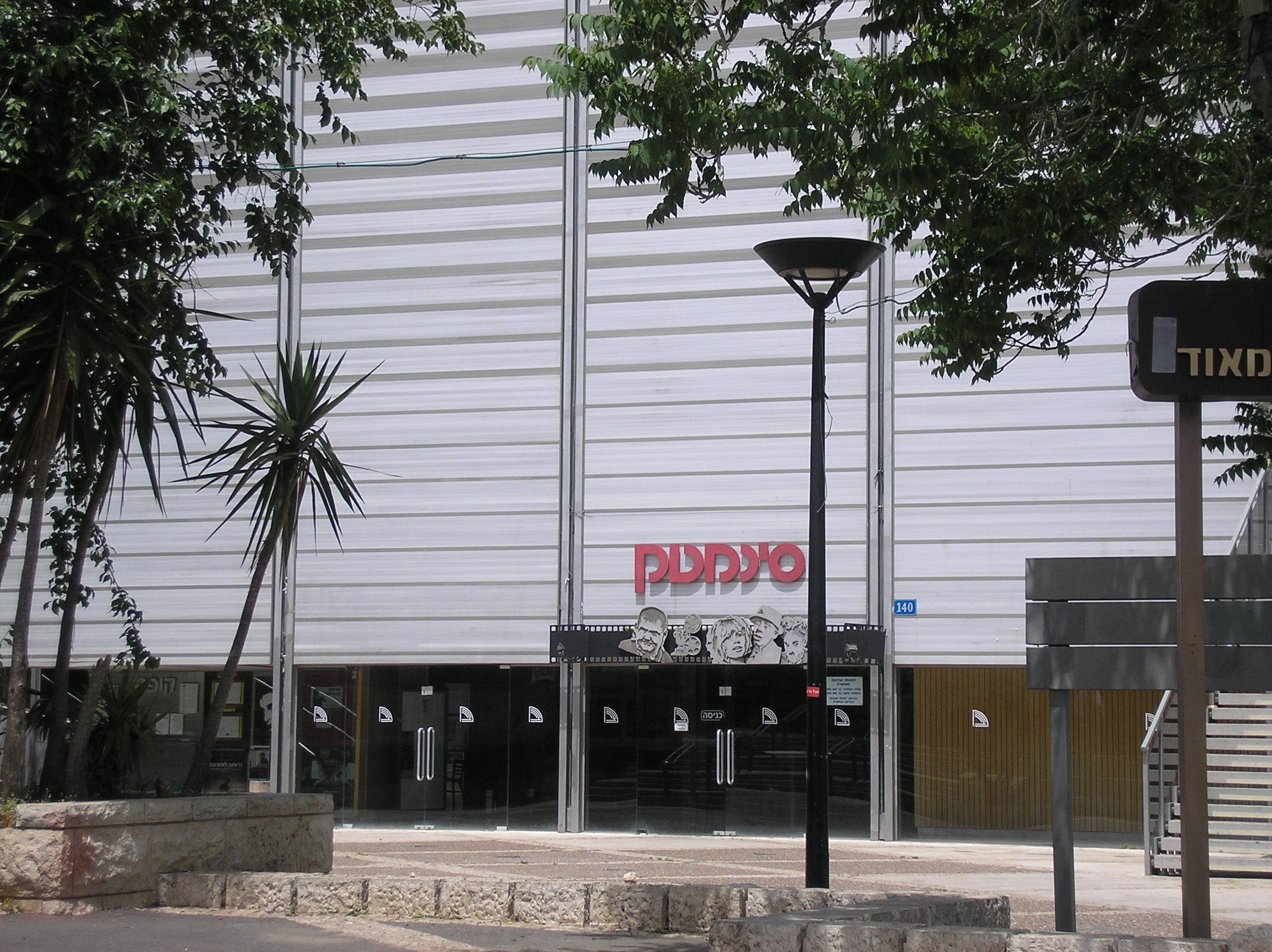
Haifa Cinematheque at the Haifa Auditorium

Haifa Cinematheque is a cinematheque located in Haifa at the Auditorium of Haifa in the Carmel Center.

== History ==
Haifa Cinematheque was established by Lia Van Leer in the early 1950s together with her husband Wim. Initially the Van Leers held cinema evenings in their home and then opened the Film Club at Rothschild House (now Beit Hecht) on the Carmel.

The Cinematheque screens over 40 different films each month in two movie theaters. The program includes screen classic, restored films, retrospectives and new movies.

Cinematheque hosts the Haifa International Film Festival, which takes place every year during Sukkot.

In 2010, a new building was built near Lev Ha'mifratz shopping mall.

== See also ==
- Tel Aviv Cinematheque
- Jerusalem Cinematheque
