= David Bedein =

Israeli journalist (born 1950)

David Bedein (Hebrew: דוד בדאין; born August 31, 1950) is an MSW, a community organizer by profession, a writer, and an investigative journalist. In 1987, Bedein established the Israel Resource News Agency, with offices at the Beit Agron Int'l Press Center in Jerusalem. He serves as Director of The Center for Near East Policy Research.

Bedein has also reported for news outlets such as CNN Radio, Makor Rishon, The Philadelphia Inquirer, The Jerusalem Post, and the Jewish World Review. For four years, Bedein was the Middle East correspondent for The Bulletin, writing 1,062 articles until the newspaper ceased operation in 2010. Bedein has covered attempts at Middle East negotiations centering Israel—in many major cities of the world. Bedein lives in Efrat with his family. One of his inspirations was the community organizer and activist Saul Alinsky.

== Work ==
Bedein was active in the Israeli peace movement for over for 17 years.

In the 1980s, Bedein went to Ethiopia as part of a delegation to investigate the impact of the famine on the Ethiopian Jewish community. He later raised money for a vocation center in Israel for Ethiopian immigrants.

The UNRWA Reform Initiative (U.R.I.) was launched by The Center for Near East Policy Research, which has been conducting news investigations and producing films since 1987. Their current project focuses on policy change at UNRWA, The United Nations Relief and Works Agency for Palestine Refugees in the Near East.

== Research and media presence ==
Bedein has overseen investigative studies of the Palestinian Authority, the Expulsion Process from Gush Katif and Samaria, The Peres Center for Peace, Peace Now, The International Center for Economic Cooperation of Yossi Beilin, the International Solidarity Movement (ISM), Adalah, the New Israel Fund, and the United Nations Relief and Works Agency for Palestine Refugees in the Near East (UNRWA).

Under the direction of David Bedein, the Center for Near East Policy Research and Israel Behind The News have produced a number of investigative video productions.

In 1999, Bedein was part of a delegation of Israelis who met with Yasser Arafat.

In July 2013, he released a film titled "Camp Jihad" allegedly showing activities and interviews in which UNRWA promotes anti-Semitism and incitement to violence in its 'summer camps'. This was not the first time he dealt with this topic. UNRWA released an official rejection of these claims, claiming the summer camp shown, and the people involved are not affiliated with UNRWA. In a November 2013 meeting between US Secretary of State, John Kerry and Israeli Prime Minister Benjamin Netanyahu, parts of this film were shown.

Bedein has been involved in the UNRWA Reform Initiative, which involves requests of donor nations to make reasonable reforms of UNRWA. Bedein's legal counsel articulated these requested reforms in a letter to the British government's Department for International Development (DFID), which assists UNRWA. In March 2014, Bedein participated in an informal panel at the British House of Commons with experts on UNRWA education.

Since the publication of his book, Bedein has discovered several new alleged findings concerning UNRWA, which were published by the two organisations he has founded, under the titles Islamic groups that fund UNRWA, Palestinian Authority Allegation: "Jews killed Christ" in the Palestinian Authority Christian Education Textbooks Used in UNRWA Schools in the West Bank, Jerusalem & Gaza, and The U.N.'s Child Death Cult Education.

Bedein presented his latest research to members of the Swedish Parliament on November 18, 2016. He appeared on a local program entitled "Follow the Money: with Swedish journalist Tobias Petterson" Following these revelations, Tobias Petterson took to the Israel National News site, Arutz 7, to express his shock over the official Palestinian Authority Ministry of Education textbooks and curriculum.

== ABC Lawsuit ==
In 1988, the American Broadcasting Company (ABC) filed a lawsuit in Israel for $1 million against Bedein's company, Israel Resources, after Bedein showed "taped copies of the network's evening news coverage of the Arab uprising" (First Intifada) at one or more events where Bedein charged a fee for entry. ABC charged that Bedein violated the copyright to the footage by showing the clips.

The New York Times provided more context in an article just following the filing of the lawsuit:

Newscasts drawn from American, Canadian and European television were shown throughout the winter months to demonstrate the disparity between foreign and Israeli coverage of the Palestinian uprising. Showing the tapes to Jerusalem audiences helped lead to outraged charges from many Israelis that the international press was being unfair to their country. Before the foreign television tapes were shown here, Israelis had seen only their own television coverage, which failed to show many of the worst cases of violence. That coverage helped many in this country form their personal impression of what was happening in the occupied territories. When they saw the foreign television coverage, many were shocked, and they accused the foreign news organizations of being biased against Israel.

ABC ultimately lost the case in 1992 on a technicality for not being able to prove a corporate link between ABC Inc. and ABC News in a move The Jerusalem Post called "a pity" in an editorial.

== Films produced by the Center for Near East Policy Research ==
The Center for Near East Policy Research has been investigating UNRWA for 27 years and has produced documentary films for over a decade, showing activities going on in schools and camps, with interviews from students and staff.

- 2022 'UNRWA Ignites Jerusalem - English'
- 2022 'UNRWA Ignites Jerusalem - עברית'
- 2022 ''Fatah Day' - UNRWA Deheishe Refugee Camp - English'
- 2022 ''Fatah Day' - UNRWA Deheishe Refugee Camp - עברית'
- 2021 'The UNRWA Child Soldier - English'
- 2021 'The UNRWA Child Soldier - עברית'
- 2021 'The UNRWA Child Soldier - German'
- 2021 'UNRWA Education to Violence'
- 2021 'UNRWA Jihad Online - English'
- 2021 'UNRWA Jihad Online - עברית'
- 2020 'UNRWA Terror Balloons - English'
- 2020 'UNRWA Terror Balloons - עברחת'
- 2020 'UNRWA Terror Balloons - German'
- 2020 'UNRWA Terror Balloons - עברית קצר'
- 2020 'UNRWA Terror Balloons - Balloons Only'
- 2020 'Incitement to Return – English'
- 2020 'Incitement to Return - עברית'
- 2020 'Incitement to Return - English & עברית'
- 2019 'The UNRWA War for Return: From Bethlehem to Jerusalem - English'
- 2019 'Profile of Mohammad Assaf: UNRWA Goodwill Ambassador for Peace - עברית'
- 2019 'Candidates for the 21st Israeli Knesset Cope with UNRWA in Gaza - English'
- 2019 'Candidates for the 21st Israeli Knesset Cope with UNRWA in Gaza - Hebrew'
- 2019 'UNRWA in Jerusalem: Anatomy of Chaos - English'
- 2019 'UNRWA in Jerusalem: Anatomy of Chaos - עברחת'
- 2018 'Terror of Return (Full Version)'
- 2018 'Terror of Return - English Short version'
- 2018 'Terror of Return - עברית Short version'
- 2018 'UNRWA Uprising'
- 2018 'Inside UNRWA Refugee Camp in Shuafat'
- 2018 'UNRWA in Jerusalem'
- 2017 'The Legacy of UNRWA'
- 2017 'Stop Child Abuse: UNRWA Prepares Child Soldiers for War'
- 2016 'UNRWA Road to Terror: Palestinian Classroom Incitement'
- 2015 'Mohammad Assaf: War Song for UNRWA'
- 2015 'Iran: Billions for Terror'
- 2015 'Children's Army of Hamas'
- 2014 'UNRWA Goes to War'
- 2013 'Camp Jihad'
- 2013 'Inside the UNRWA Classroom'
- 2011 'UNRWA Right of Return Summer Camp'
- 2011 'Palestinian Refugee Policy: From Despair to Hope - Parts 1—2'
- 2010 'For the Sake of Nakba'
- 2004 'Hostages of Hatred - Parts 1—6'
