= National Photo Collection (Israel) =

Israeli government photo library (1948-)

The National Photo Collection of Israel is an archive of historical photos, located at the Government Press Office, in Beit Agron, Jerusalem. Most of the photos in the archive are in black and white, but most modern additions to the collection are in color.

The photography department of the Government Press Office was established by David Ildan in 1948 in Tel Aviv. In 1983 the collection was transferred to Jerusalem, when Israel's government decided to relocate the Government Press Office to the State of Israel, Jerusalem.

On Israel's 50th independence day, the Government Press Office decided, along with Tehila (the Governmental Internet Committee), to upload the collection to the Internet.

Thousands of photos were scanned and are available for downloading at the official site in low resolution.
