= Ahmad Agha Duzdar =

Mayor of Jerusalem (1838–1863)

Ahmad Agha Duzdar Al-Asali
- أحمد آغا بن فضل الدين آغا العسلي دزدار
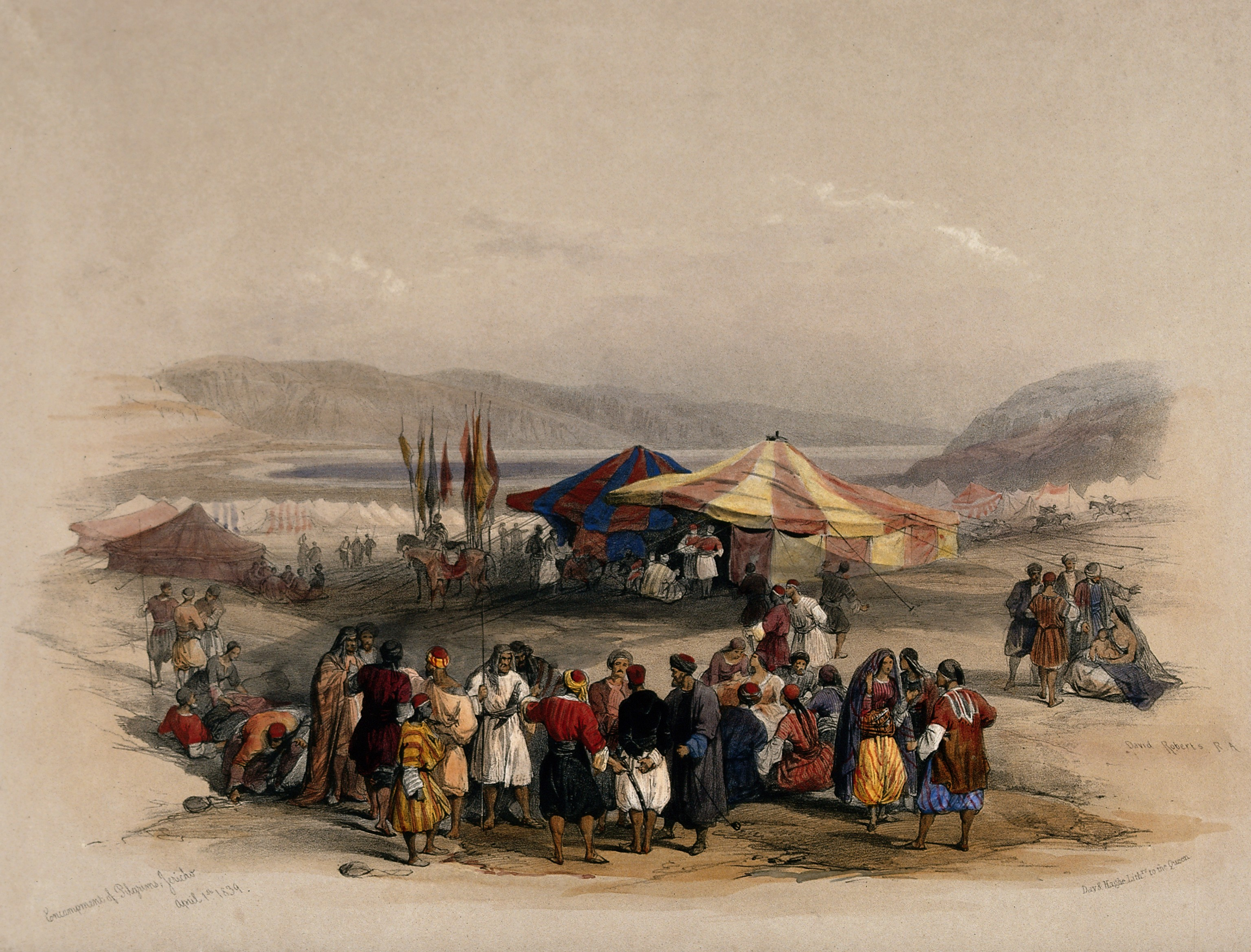
- Ahmad Agha's tent, on his journey from Jerusalem to the Dead Sea with David Roberts, published in The Holy Land, Syria, Idumea, Arabia, Egypt, and Nubia.

Ottoman Governor of Jerusalem
- In office 1838–1863

Personal details
- Born: Ahmad Agha Fadhelaldin Agha Al-Asali Duzdar
- Resting place: Mamilla Cemetery, Jerusalem
- Occupation: Politician
- Known for: Selling land to Moses Montefiore for Mishkenot Sha'ananim

Ahmad Agha Fadhelaldin Agha Al-Asali Duzdar (Arabic: أحمد آغا بن فضل الدين آغا العسلي دزدار) was Mayor of Jerusalem and Governor of Jerusalem from 1838 to as late as 1863.

In 1838 Ahmad Agha accompanied David Roberts from Jerusalem to the river Jordan, together with 4,000 Christian pilgrims.

His name appears in a petition by Muhammad Sharif in 1840 demanding that "the Jews must not be enabled to carry out the paving, and they must be cautioned against raising their voices and displaying their books at the Western wall."

His official title was 'Ottoman Governor of Jerusalem'. He was known for his dealings with Moses Montefiore, having sold him the land to acquire Mishkenot Sha'ananim, which was built in 1860.

In 2005, the Turkish government in consultation with the Wakf built a marker for his grave which is in the southern end of the Mamilla Cemetery in west Jerusalem.

== Gallery ==
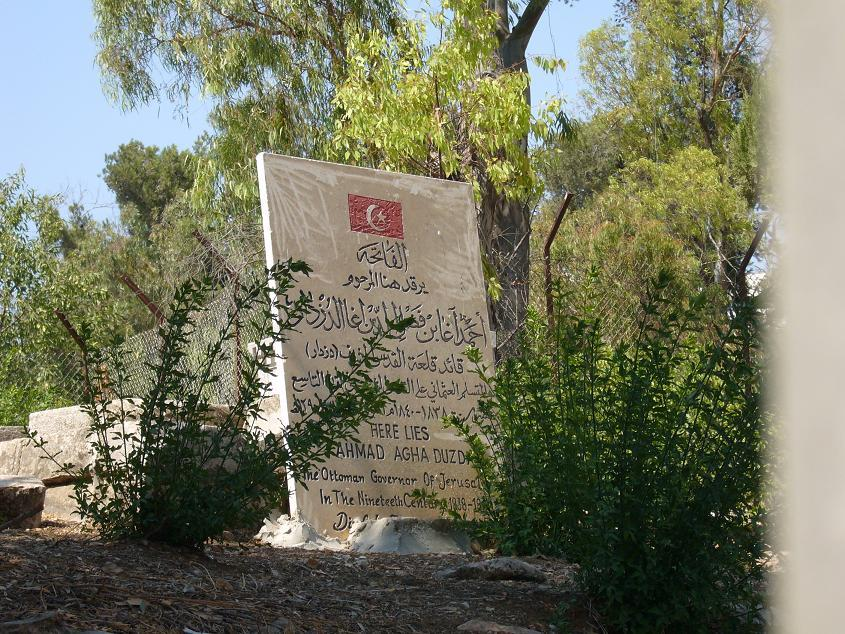
The Grave of Ahmad Agha Fadhelaldin Agha Al-Asali Duzdar in the Mamilla Cemetery, Jerusalem

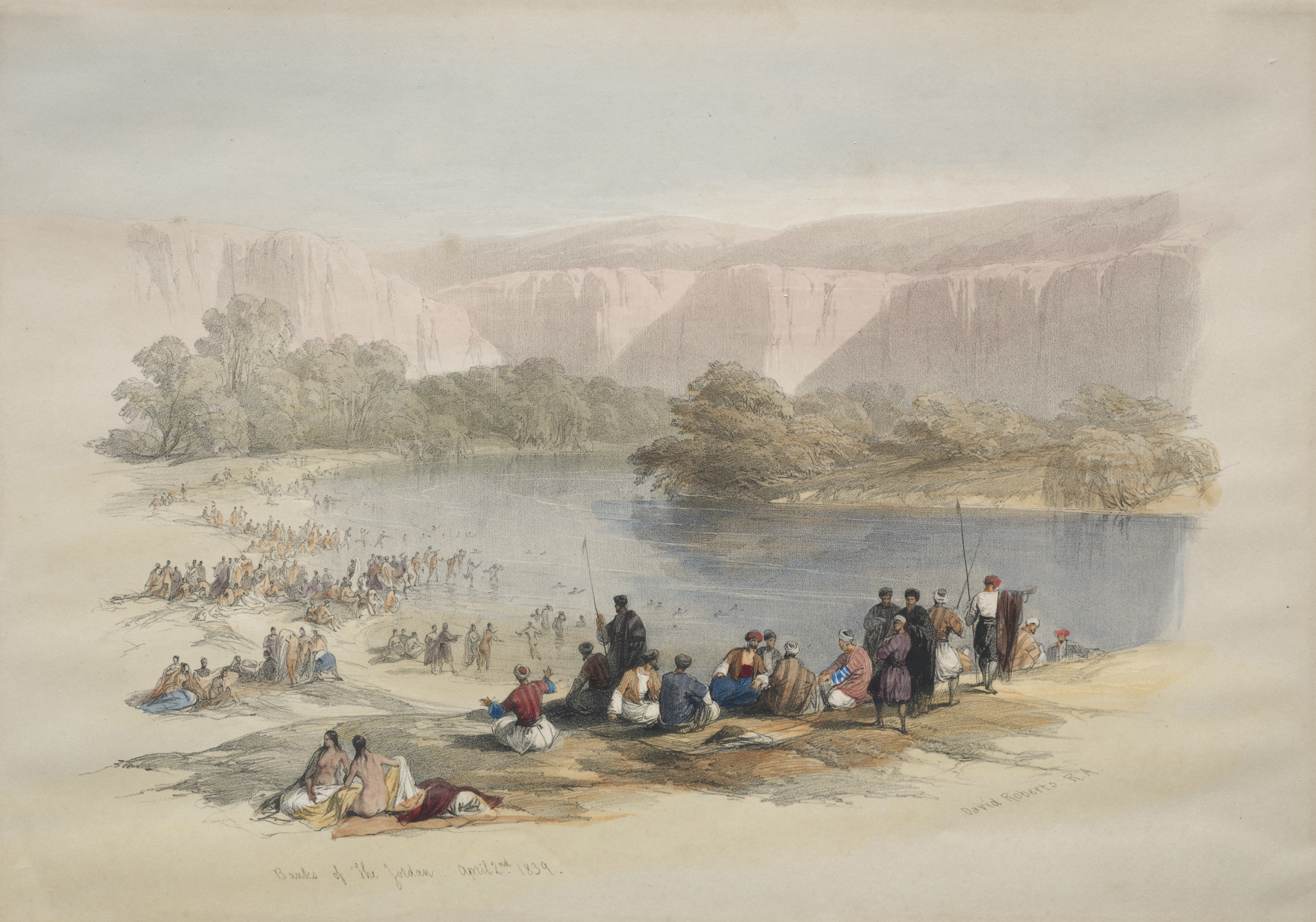
David Roberts' Immersion of the Pilgrims; the accompanying text notes: "In this View Achmet Aga, the Governor of Jerusalem, with a part of his Arab guard, occupy the foreground."
