= Noa Regev =

Israeli CEO

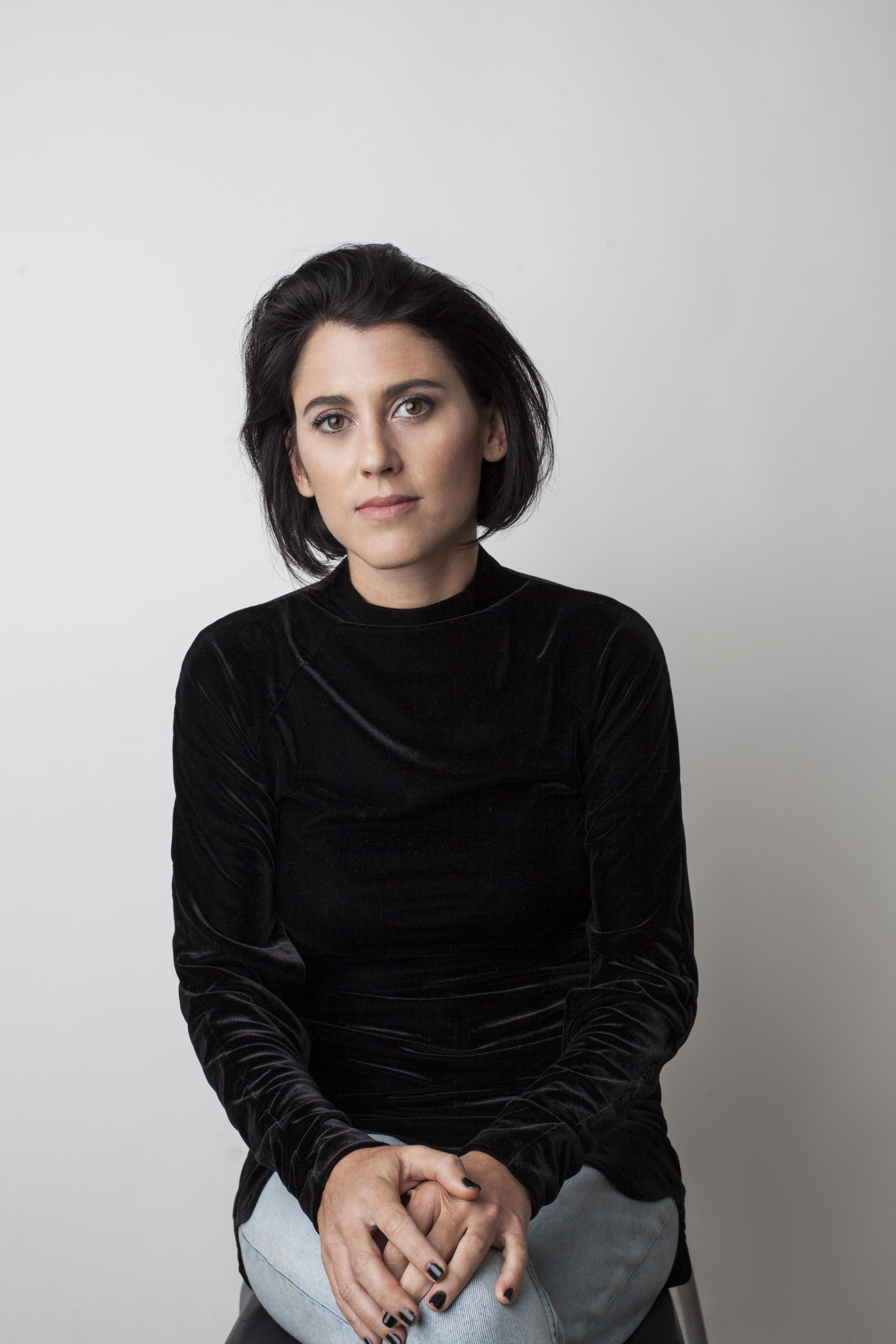

Dr. Noa Regev (Hebrew: נועה רגב; born February 17, 1982) is the CEO of the Israel Film Fund, and a former CEO of the Jerusalem Cinematheque.

== Early life ==
Noa Regev was born in Tel Aviv in 1982, to Moti Regev, a Hi-tech professional, and Avital Regev-Shoshani, a copy editor. She received her primary education at the Tel Aviv School of Arts (1988-1997). She attended Igal Alon High School in Ramat Hasharon, from which she graduated in 2000 with a major in Film Studies. In 2001 she was recruited to the IDF and served in the Israeli Air Force as an officer in an air brigade until 2003.

== Career ==
=== Academic career ===
In 2003, Noa enrolled in the Steve Tisch School of Film and Television at Tel Aviv University. In 2005, she received the Rector's Award of Excellence from Tel Aviv University and in 2006, she completed her bachelor's degree with cum laude distinction.

From 2006 to 2009, Regev taught Film Studies at the Tel Aviv Ironi Aleph School and worked as a teaching assistant at the Tel Aviv University Department of Film. In 2007, she became a lecturer at Open University in the Department of Language, Literature, and Art. In 2009, she received her MA cum laude from the Department of Film and Television at Tel Aviv University. That same year, Regev began lecturing in Cultural Studies, Production and Creativity at the Department of Film at Sapir Academic College. In addition, she began lecturing in the Department of Film and Television at the Faculty of Arts at Tel Aviv University.

Regev also won the Rector's Award of Excellence for Teachers. In 2011, she began to serve as a graduate advisor for MA students at Tel Aviv University's Department of Film. In 2013, she completed her PhD and was certified by the Department of Film and Television at Tel Aviv University. The topic of her research was "Children's Films" and dealt with "The Status of Children's Films within the multi-system of Cinema", in its generic definition and its dynamic relationship with other cinematic models.

=== Cinema industry career ===
Noa Regev began working at the Tel Aviv Cinematheque at the age of 15, fulfilling various roles. In 2005, as part of her work, she staffed a few production roles at the Docaviv Festival. From 2010–2011, she directed the International Students' Film Festival in Tel Aviv. From 2012–2013, she served as the Director of the Holon Cinematheque.

In late 2013, she was appointed CEO of the Association "Jerusalem Cinematheque – Israeli Film Archive and Jerusalem Film Festival", which was responsible for management and operation of the Cinematheque and the Jerusalem Film Festival. In 2015 she served as a jury on the panel of the Munich Student Film Festival. In 2018, Regev served as a jury at the Berlin International Film Festival.

In 2022, Regev was named CEO of the Israel Film Fund, which was established in 1979 and supports the development, production, and marketing of Israeli films.
