= Agron House =

Landmark in Jerusalem, Israel

Coordinates: 31°46′47″N 35°13′16″E

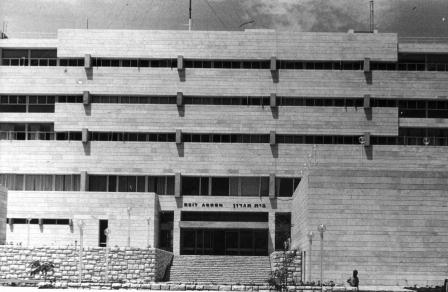
Beit Agron on Hillel Street

Agron House (Hebrew: בית אגרון, Beit Agron) is a landmark in downtown Jerusalem. Constructed in memory of Gershon Agron, it has housed various Israeli national institutions in pursuit of the arts. It is located at 37 Hillel Street.

== Planning and construction ==
After Jerusalem mayor Gershon Agron died in office in 1959, a group of his friends formed the Agron Committee. This committee tasked themselves with creating a suitable tribute to the life of Agron. They first convened a year after his death in Moshe Sharett's room in the Savoy Hilton Hotel in New York to plan a memorial project dedicated to Agron. Sharett was the group's chairman, with Israel Goldstein and Meyer Weisgal co-chairs; Goldstein and Weisgal had previously worked on the construction of the Jewish Palestine Pavilion at the 1939 World's Fair together.

The cornerstone of Beit Agron was laid on 10 October 1961 by Sharett. Cemented into it was a scroll signed by Agron's widow Ethel, his children Danny and Varda, his mayoral successor Mordechai Ish-Shalom, and members of the Agron Committee as well as other Israeli notables. In a tribute at the Beit Agron cornerstone ceremony, Goldstein said Agron was "the journalist par excellence", also praising his services as an ambassador for Israel and Zionism:

Wherever he came, he not only reflected the light of Zion but radiated it to Jews and non-Jews. His warm, sparkling personality captured many hearts and his brilliant, untrammeled approach captured many minds. Gershon disarmed antagonists, converted neutrals into partisans, and partisans into enthusiasts.

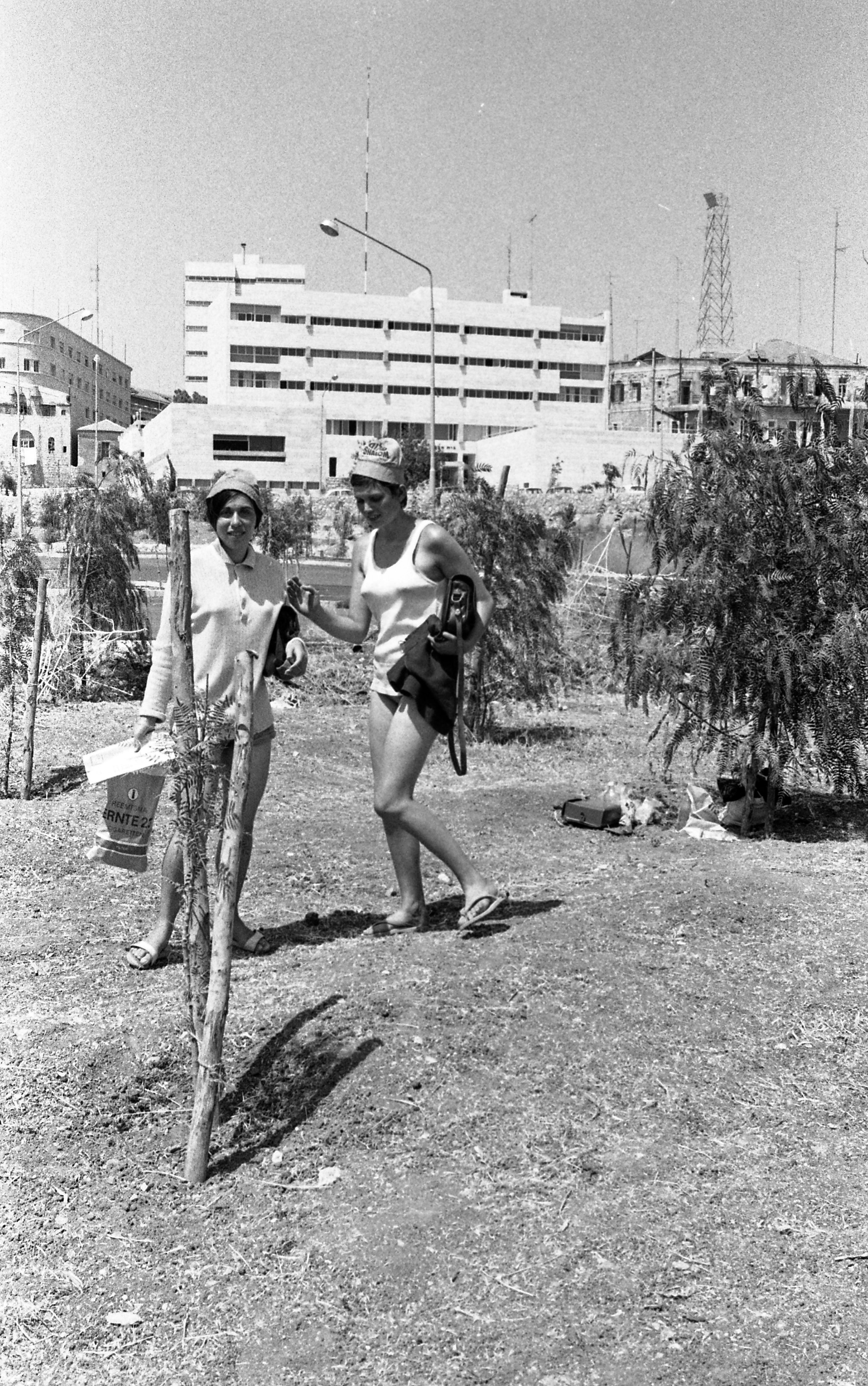
Women in Independence Park in 1969, overlooked by Agron House

Agron House was designed as a minimalist and modernist building by David Resnick, and construction began in 1963. It is a complex of three buildings comprising a four-story office block, a large auditorium known as Moses Hall, and a conference hall which has also functioned as a restaurant. In front of the building is a parking lot, for which some of Independence Park was paved over. The Morris L. Schaver Auditorium is located in Agron House, the creation of which was supported by the Jerusalem Foundation. It was named after an American whose widowed wife, Emma Schaver, was a singer.

The building was completed in 1969, and opened on 3 June 1969 by prime minister Golda Meir. Celebrations included a "festive lunch".

== History ==
It was created as the headquarters of the Israeli Press Association, where Jerusalem's journalists were all based, but no longer serves this purpose. It has also previously housed the Jerusalem Cinematheque (and National Film Archive), the National Photo Collection, newspaper foreign bureaus and the Government Press Office (GPO), and student dormitories of the Bezalel Academy of Arts and Design.

The Jerusalem Cinematheque (founded by Lia van Leer) existed at Agron House from 1975 until the 1980s; a 1980 grant saw construction of its own building begin. After this, the cinema at Agron House and the Jerusalem Cinematheque (as separate cinemas) were the first to show films on the Sabbath, which eventually drew protest from ultra-Orthodox residents in the 1980s. Their film screenings on Friday nights were accompanied by lectures (of debatable quality) about the film, as venues could only operate on the Sabbath for "cultural events"; the ultra-Orthodox community started protesting when other cinemas started showing films on the Sabbath, which they did without pretense of lectures, and a wider movement to have more Sabbath entertainment began. Over time, as the foreign bureaus closed or reduced capacity, they left Agron House, and the GPO followed in 2011. That year, the Bezalel school won a tender to operate the building, splitting it between dorms and commercial space. It is the location of the Center for Near East Policy Research, directed by David Bedein.

Beit Amir, which is located at 1 Agron Street, is sometimes called Beit Agron, but is a different building. It was also designed by Resnick and constructed in the 1960s.
