= List of Israeli films of 1956 =

A list of films produced by the Israeli film industry in 1956.

== 1956 releases ==
Premiere	Title	Director	Cast	Genre	Notes	Ref
?	B'Ein Moledet (Hebrew: באין מולדת, lit. "No Homeland")	Nuri Habib	Shoshana Damari, Shaike Ophir	Drama		
?	Ma'aseh B'Monit (Hebrew: מעשה במונית, lit. "A Taxi Tale")	Larry Frisch		Adventure, Comedy, Drama	Geva Films	
?	Dan Quihote V'Sa'adia Pansa (Hebrew: דן קישוט וסעדיה פנצ'ו, lit. "Dan Quihote V'Sa'adia Pansa")	Nathan Axelrod		Drama		

== See also ==
- 1956 in Israel
