= Hillel Street =

Thoroughfare in Jerusalem, Israel

Coordinates: 31°46′47.16″N 35°13′8.99″E

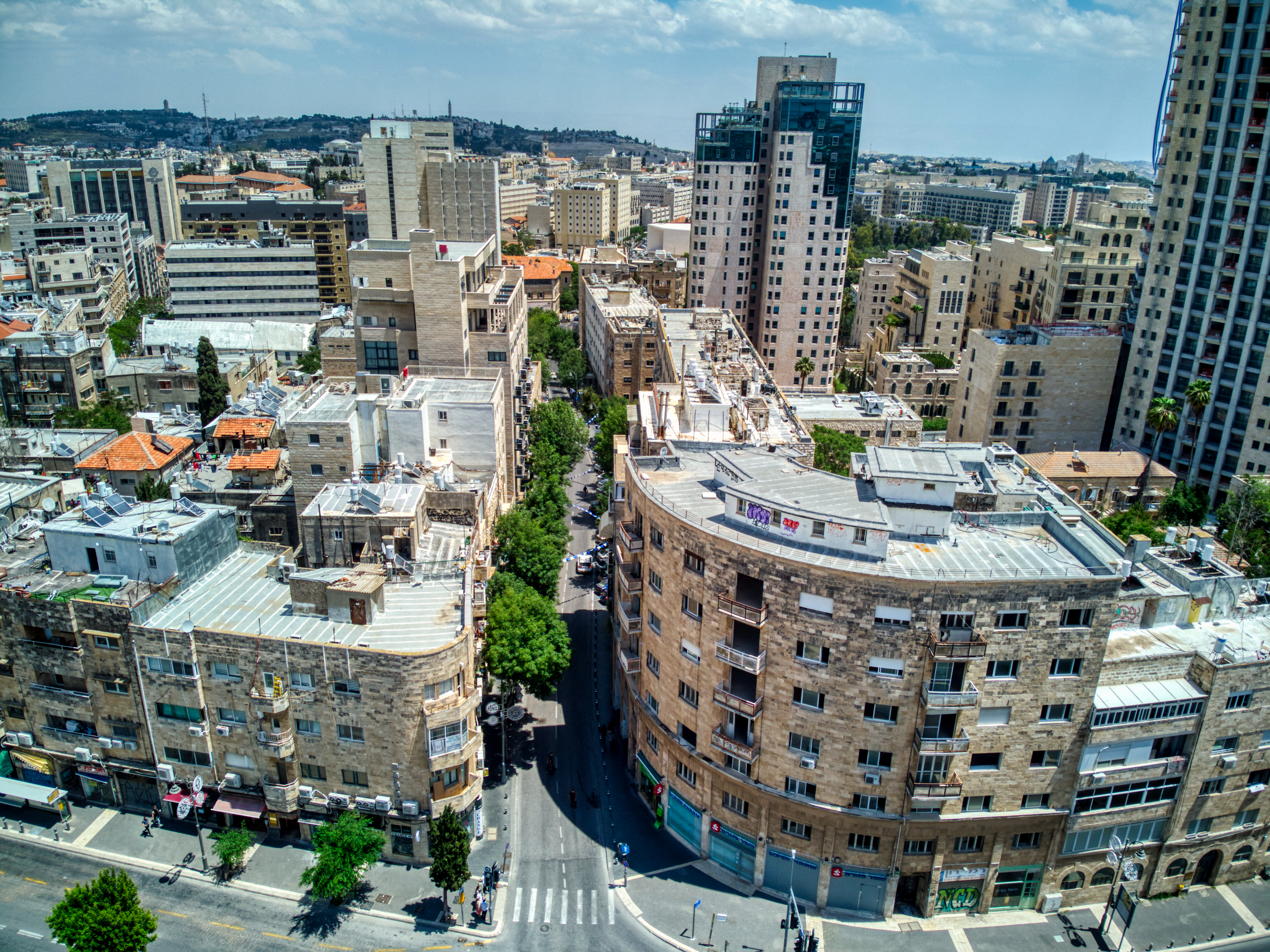
Hillel Street

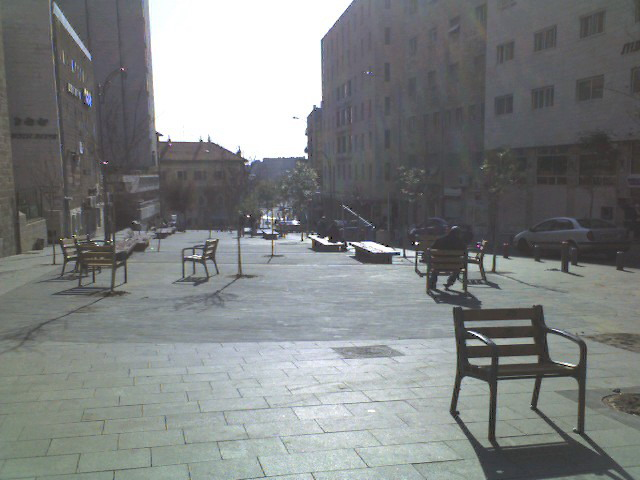
Hillel Street, Kikar Roma, eastward. Red-roofed structure center left is the Italian Synagogue

Hillel Street (Hebrew: רחוב הלל, Rehov Hillel) is one of the central streets of Jerusalem. It connects King George Street to the small Ben Sira Street and the Mamilla neighbourhood and is parallel to Ben Yehuda Street. The lower part of the road is between Independence Park and the Nahalat Shiva neighborhood.

The street was named for Hillel the Elder, and a street parallel to it is called Shammai Street (after Shammai the Elder). Most of the buildings on the street date from the British Mandate period and follow the architectural style of that time.

It is located in the business district. There are shops, cafes, pubs and office buildings. On the street there are the first two original cafés of the chains Aroma Espresso Bar and Café Hillel (which got its name from the street).

Among the notable buildings are:

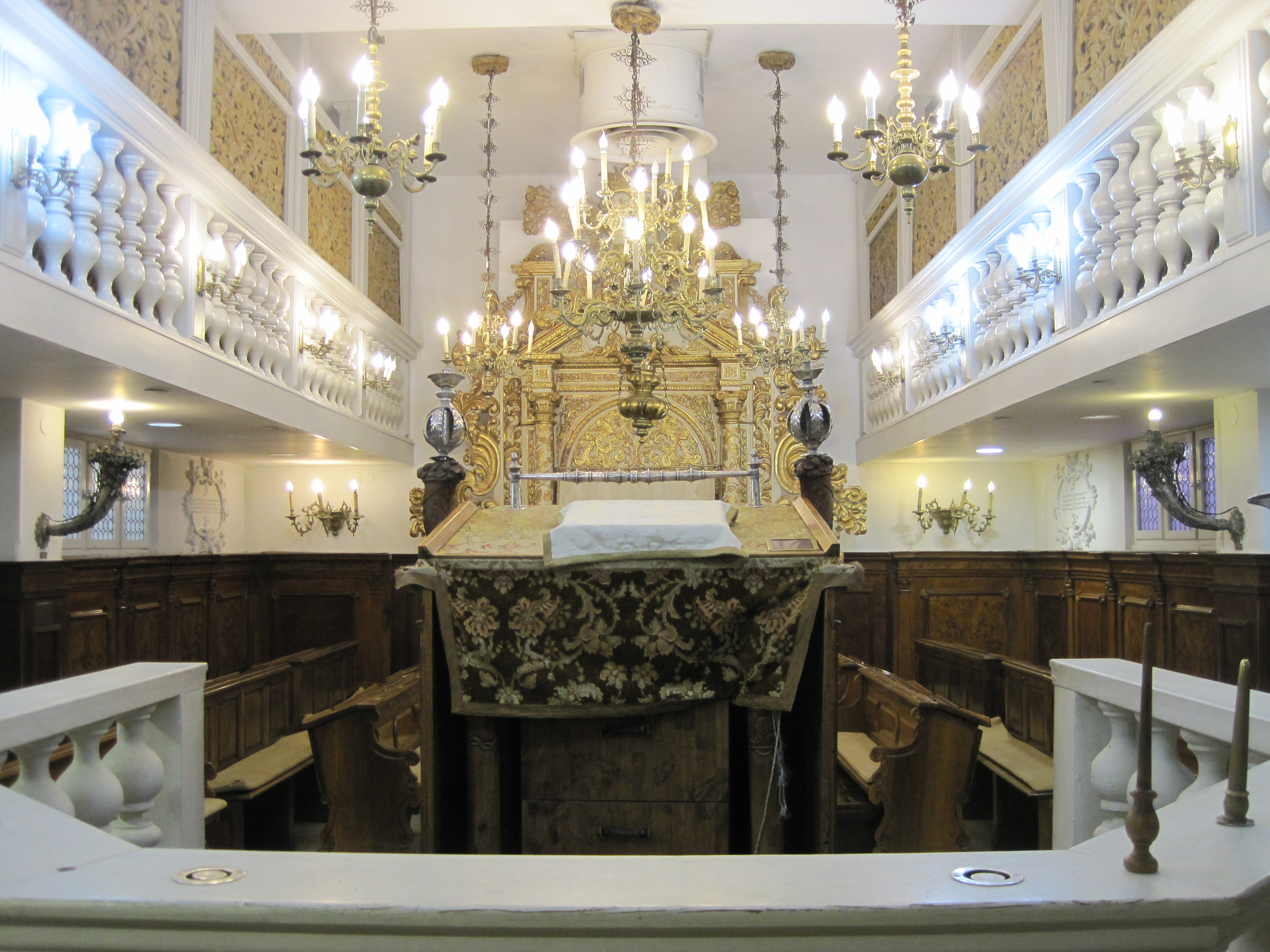
The interior of the Italian synagogue. The furniture was moved from the defunct synagogue in Conegliano, built around 1700, and moved to Jerusalem in the early 1950s.

- Hotel Eden, former offices of the Bank of Israel and today the Ministry of Immigrant Absorption
- Jerusalem Hotel Tower (Migdal Yerushalayim)
- Italian Synagogue and the Umberto Nahon Museum of Italian Jewish Art
- Beit Agron, which houses the offices of the foreign press of the government
