= Museum of Tolerance Jerusalem =

Museum in Jerusalem

- מוזיאון הסובלנות ירושלים

- Tolerance Museum in downtown Jerusalem
- Location: Jerusalem
- Coordinates: 31°46′44″N 35°13′12″E
- Founder: Simon Wiesenthal Center
- Architects: Frank Gehry, Bracha and Michael Chyutin
- Website: Website

The Museum of Tolerance Jerusalem (MTJ; Hebrew: מוזיאון הסובלנות ירושלים, romanized: Muzeon HaSovlanut Yerushalayim) is a museum, convention center and entertainment venue in downtown Jerusalem.

== History ==
The three-acre, 185,000 square foot campus stands at the center of West Jerusalem between Zion Square and the neighborhood of Mamilla. Construction began in 2004, but changes were necessary due to planning objections.

The completed complex will include a garden, a 1,000-seat outdoor amphitheater, a 400-seat indoor theater, two museums, auditoriums and lecture rooms including an 800-seat lecture hall and a 500-seat banquet hall. The museum overlooks Mamilla Cemetery which dates back to the Crusades. Human remains were disinterred during the construction.

Two museums, one for children and one for adults, will explore the concept of tolerance in Israeli society. They will address topics like tolerance in sports and the health and education systems. According to the Simon Wiesenthal Center, the museum will address "global anti-Semitism, extremism, hate, human dignity and responsibility, and promoting unity and respect among Jews and people of all faiths." Unlike the Museum of Tolerance of Los Angeles, the MTJ will not deal with the Holocaust since Yad Vashem in Jerusalem is already dedicated to this purpose.

Another goal of the MTJ is to revive the city center as a venue for theater and music performances, conventions, food and wine festivals, children's events and art workshops.

== Design and construction ==
The first architect hired for the project was an Israeli architect, Ofer Kolker, before being turned over to Frank Gehry The center was then re-designed on a more modest scale by Israeli architects Bracha and Michael Chyutin, who withdrew from the project allegedly over a "commercial dispute". The rights to their design are owned by the Simon Wiesenthal Center, who entrusted the completion of the project to the Hong Kong-based Aedas architectural firm in cooperation with the Yigal Levy architects' office in Jerusalem.

Governor of California Arnold Schwarzenegger was invited to a ground-breaking ceremony on 30 April 2004. A partial opening was scheduled for 2022, with the two museum exhibits to be completed later.

The top two floors of the building are connected by a "floating staircase," with floor-to-ceiling windows looking south onto Independence Park. The glass is covered with different patterns of dots to minimize heat and radiation from the sun.

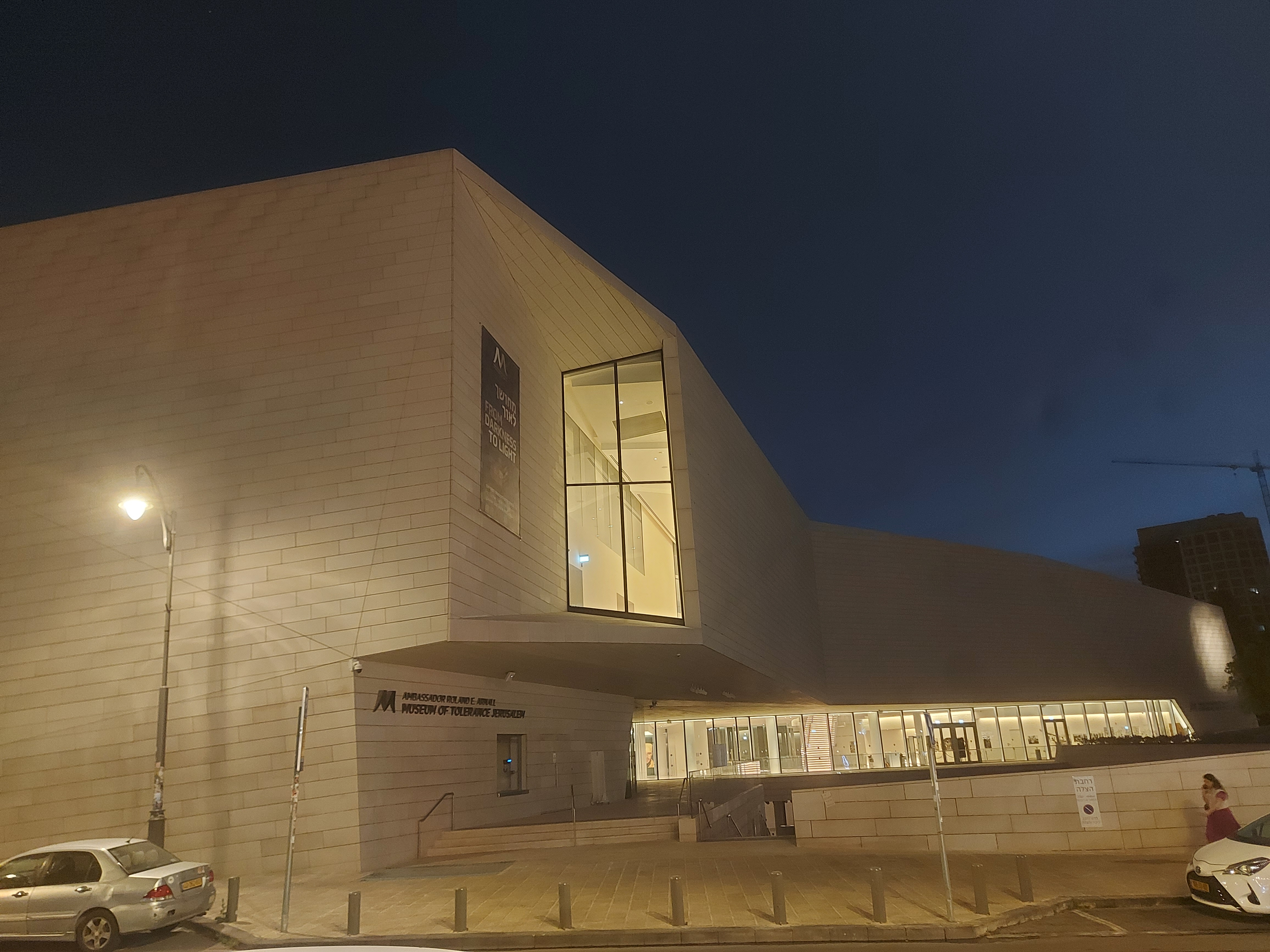
Museum of tolerance Jerusalem in evening

=== Controversy ===
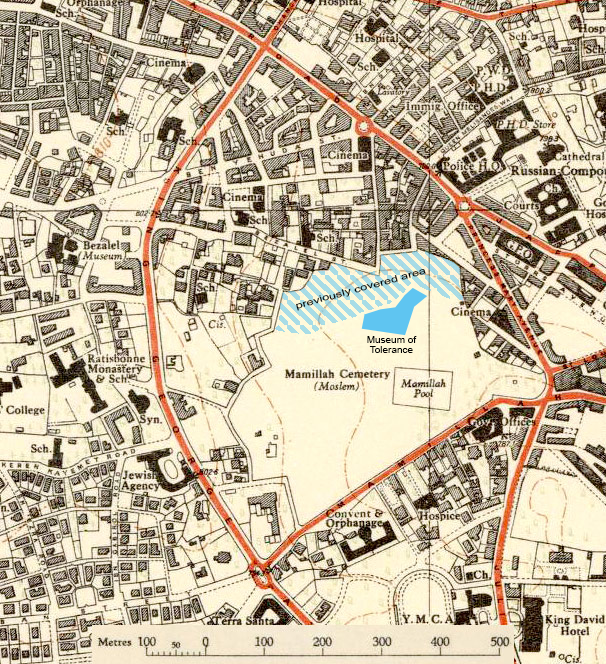
Museum of Tolerance, relative to 1946 boundaries of Mamillah Cemetery. The hatched area and some of the solid blue area were already covered by buildings or pavement before the Museum of Tolerance was built

The project has been criticized for not addressing the occupation, discrimination and human rights issues, leading to its perception as a right-wing institution.

Those who are in favor of the center, including former Jerusalem mayor Uri Lupolianski, maintain that it will bring tourists to the city, while opponents (excluding the Muslim gravesite objection) argue that it will draw attention away from the traditional architecture of neighboring streets and that of the city in general. Former deputy mayor of Jerusalem Meron Benvenisti objected to the museum's "geometric forms that can't be any more dissonant to the environment in which it is planned to put this alien object." Other objections are related to urbanism, and the contention that central locations are less suitable for conventions and "flashy events."

The museum's footprint intrudes into the Mamilla Cemetery, which dates back to the time of the Crusades and contains the graves of Islamic figures, as well as several Mamluk tombs. It has been characterized as "the largest and most important Muslim cemetery in all of Palestine". It was used as a burial site up until 1927 when the Supreme Muslim Council decided to preserve it as a historic site. Following the 1948 Arab–Israeli War, the cemetery and other waqf properties in West Jerusalem fell under the control of Israeli governmental bodies.

Construction was halted several times by the courts before being allowed to continue. After controversy concerning its location on part of the land of a burial site came to head, the museum's construction was frozen by a Supreme Court order issued in February 2006. In November 2008, the Israeli Supreme Court allowed construction to proceed, noting that this corner of the cemetery had been transformed into a parking lot "as long ago as the 1960s", and that Jerusalem has been inhabited for roughly 4,000 years, and many ancient sites have been built over. The decision faced criticism from many Palestinians, Muslims around the world, and some Israeli and American Jews.

The groups who initiated the legal action had been undergoing mediation with representatives of the Simon Wiesenthal Center. Former Supreme Court president Meir Shamgar served as the mediator.

MTJ was accused of hiding the multiple purpose of the center as a convention center and cultural venue in addition to a museum, which was what it was zoned for. However, MTJ says the range of use was clear from the beginning.

== Visiting exhibits ==
=== Documenting Israel ===
In April 2023 the museum launched a temporary exhibit called "Documenting Israel: Visions of 75 Years", displaying select historic photos by a few members of Magnum Photos who visited Israel in its founding years in between the late 1940s and early 1970s. The collection include photos by Magnum founders Robert Capa and David "Chim" Seymour. The exhibit was curated by Anna-Patricia Kahn.

== See also ==
- List of Israeli museums
- Architecture of Israel
