= Independence Park (Jerusalem) =

Coordinates: 31°46′38.88″N 35°13′8.29″E

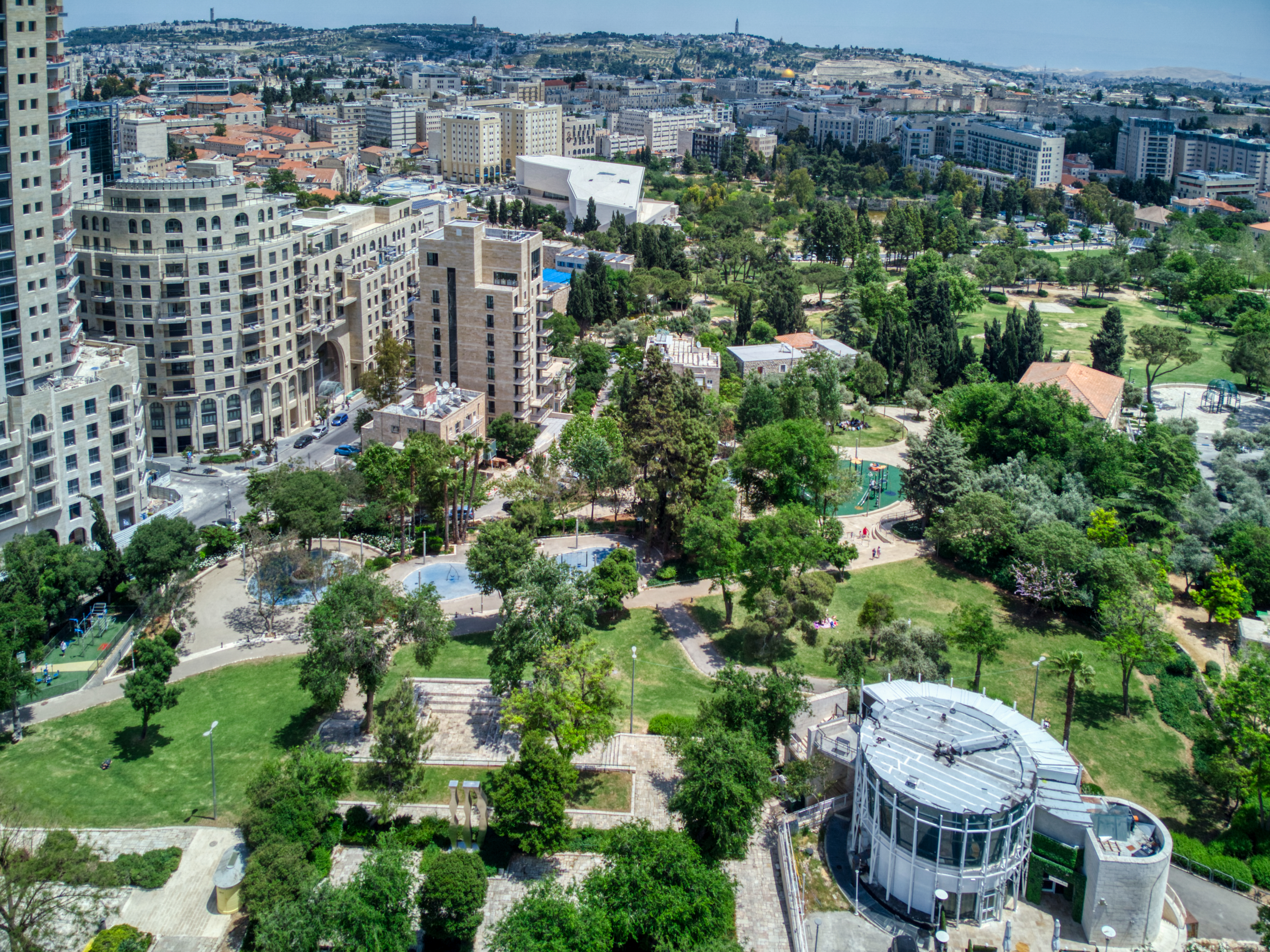
Independence Park in Jerusalem

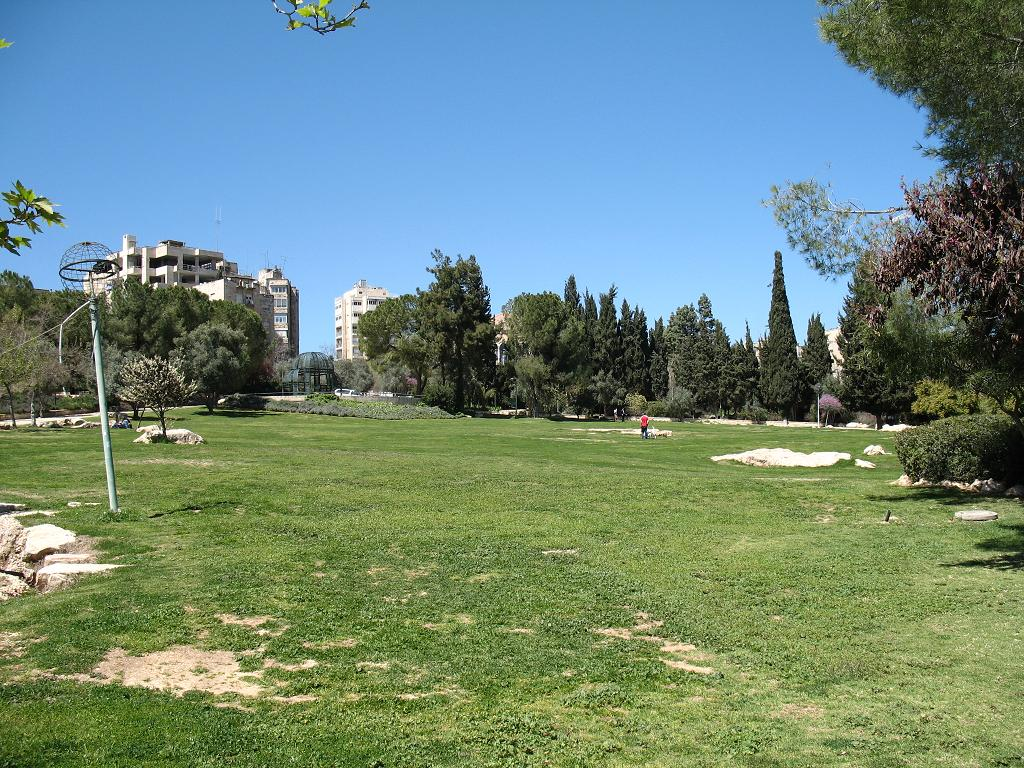
Independence Park in 2007

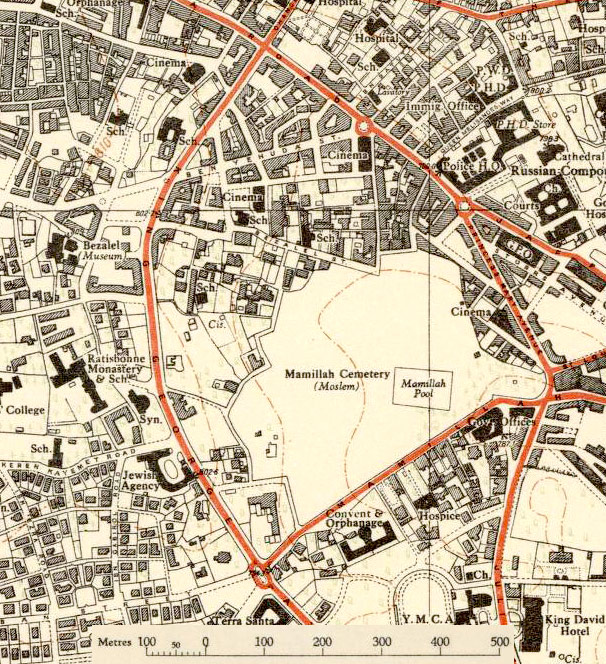
The "Mamillah Cemetery (Moslem)" 1946, including the present "Independence Park".

Independence Park (Hebrew: גן העצמאות, Gan ha-Atsma'ut) is a municipal park in Jerusalem bounded by Agron Street, King George Street, Hillel Street, and Menashe Ben Yisrael Street. It is Jerusalem's second largest park.

== History ==
The park was founded on top of the Western part of the Mamilla cemetery, the main Muslim cemetery of Jerusalem, founded in the seventh century C.E. Several of the prophet Muhammad's Sahaba (followers) as well as many of Saladin's soldiers are buried in Mamilla. It was the largest Muslim cemetery in Palestine. In 1927, during the British Mandate period, the Supreme Muslim Council lifted the sanctification of the cemetery and ruled against further burials there. In 1946, plans were drawn up to establish the Arab League headquarters there, but they remained on paper.

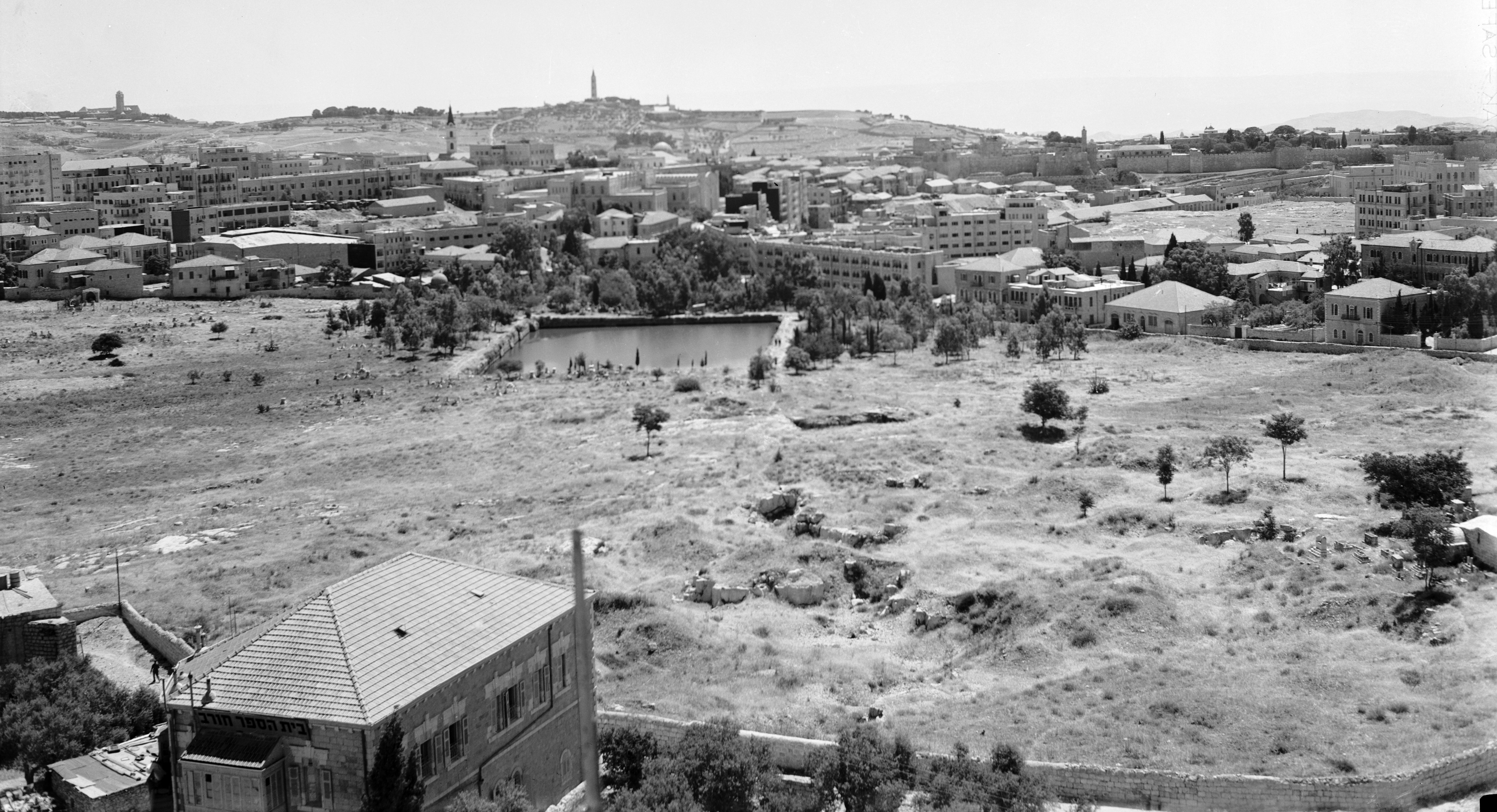
Mamilla Pool and environs, early 20th century

After the 1948 war, the cemetery was incorporated into the Israeli municipality of Jerusalem. The cemetery was neglected and largely bulldozed by Israeli authorities in the 1950s. By 1967 less than ten percent of the graves remained.

In 1964, Jerusalem mayor Mordechai Ish-Shalom appealed to the Qadi of Jaffa and the chairman of the Sharia court of appeals, seeking permission to build a park there, with part of the cemetery preserved as a historic monument.

Over the years, the Jerusalem Foundation placed several sculptures in the park. In 1972, The Loop, an abstract bronze sculpture by American sculptor Robert Engman was erected on a natural rock shelf in the center of the park (later relocated to a different park). In 1983, Tremor, a minimalist sculpture by Michael Gross, recipient of the Israel Prize for Sculpture in 2002, was placed on a hill at the park’s edge.

The park underwent major renovations by the Jerusalem Foundation in 1996. Shlomo Aronson redesigned it, creating an undulating, grassy central space and waterways that lead down to the Mamilla Pool, an ancient reservoir thought to have provided part of the Old City’s water supply. The park is home to the Lion's cave. Jewish, Muslim, and Christian legends all maintain that the remains of their faithful are buried there, and that a lion, created by God, was placed there to guard the dead. Jewish tradition states that the bones of Jews killed by the Seleucid Greeks are buried there. Muslims state that Allah transferred remains from the nearby Mamilla cemetery to the cave to save them from a fire. Christians believe that the cave houses the remains of monks who were massacred by the Persians in 614. Some Muslim graves from the 13th century remain at the bottom of the park.

The park is one of the gay cruising areas in Jerusalem and a focal point for LGBT activities, including the annual gay pride parade.
