= Lia van Leer =

Israeli arts administrator and film archivist (1924–2015)

- ליה ון ליר
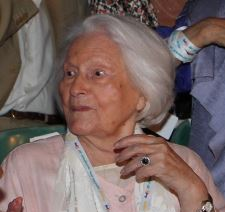
- Van Leer in 2012
- Born: Lia Greenberg; 8 August 1924; Bălți, Kingdom of Romania (now Moldova)
- Died: 13 March 2015 (aged 90); Jerusalem, Israel
- Education: Hebrew University of Jerusalem
- Occupations: Arts administrator; film archivist
- Spouse: Wim van Leer (m. 1952; died 1991)

Lia van Leer (née Greenberg; Hebrew: ליה ון ליר; 8 August 1924 – 13 March 2015) was a Romanian-born Israeli arts administrator and film archivist. A pioneer of art film programming and film archiving, Van Leet was the founder of the Haifa Cinematheque, the Jerusalem Cinematheque, the Israel Film Archive and the Jerusalem Film Festival.

== Biography ==
Lia Greenberg was born on 8 August 1924 in Bălți, Kingdom of Romania (present-day Moldova) to a Bessarabian-Jewish family. Her father, Simon Greenberg, was a wheat exporter and her mother, Olga, was a WIZO volunteer. She attended a public high school and spent summer holidays in the Carpathian mountains. In 1940, her parents sent her to Palestine to visit her sister Bruria, a dentist, who had immigrated in 1936 and was living in Tel Aviv. She never saw her parents again.

In July 1941, the Germans murdered her father and other Jewish community leaders. Her mother and grandmother were deported to Transnistria and died in a concentration camp. Lia moved to Jerusalem in 1943 to attend the Hebrew University of Jerusalem. In 1952, she married Wim Van Leer, a Dutch engineer, pilot, playwright and film producer, and settled in Haifa. They founded the country's first film club in 1955.

"There was no television back then ... and we had a 16 mm projector that had come as a gift from my father-in-law. Each Friday we would have friends over to watch movies. Our house became the most popular in Haifa", she recalled. This film club became the Haifa Cinematheque. The Van Leers' private collection of films was the basis for the Israeli Film Archive, founded in 1960.

In 1973, a Brazilian businessman, George Ostrovsky, who dreamt of creating a cinematheque in Israel, approached the van Leers and persuaded them and Teddy Kollek to share his dream. Ostrovsky donated the necessary funds to build the Jerusalem Film Center (comprising the Israel Film Archives and the Jerusalem Cinematheque) in the Hinnom Valley below the Old City walls. Teddy Kollek and the Jerusalem Foundation mobilized more funding from friends in Hollywood and around the world. The Jerusalem Cinematheque opened in 1981, and Lia van Leer was named its first director. After the death of her husband in 1991, she inaugurated the Wim Van Leer Award for High School Students to encourage young filmmakers. In its first year, eight films were submitted; in 2008, 90 films contended for the prize.

In 1995, she headed the jury at the 45th Berlin International Film Festival.

== Awards ==
In 2004, Lia van Leer was awarded the Israel Prize for her lifetime achievement & special contribution to society and the State of Israel. She won a prize for her volunteer work from Israeli president Chaim Herzog in 1988.

== Death ==
Lia van Leer died on March 13, 2015, aged 90, from undisclosed causes.

== See also ==
- List of Israel Prize recipients
