= Jerusalem Cinematheque =

Coordinates: 31°46′11.66″N 35°13′33.82″E

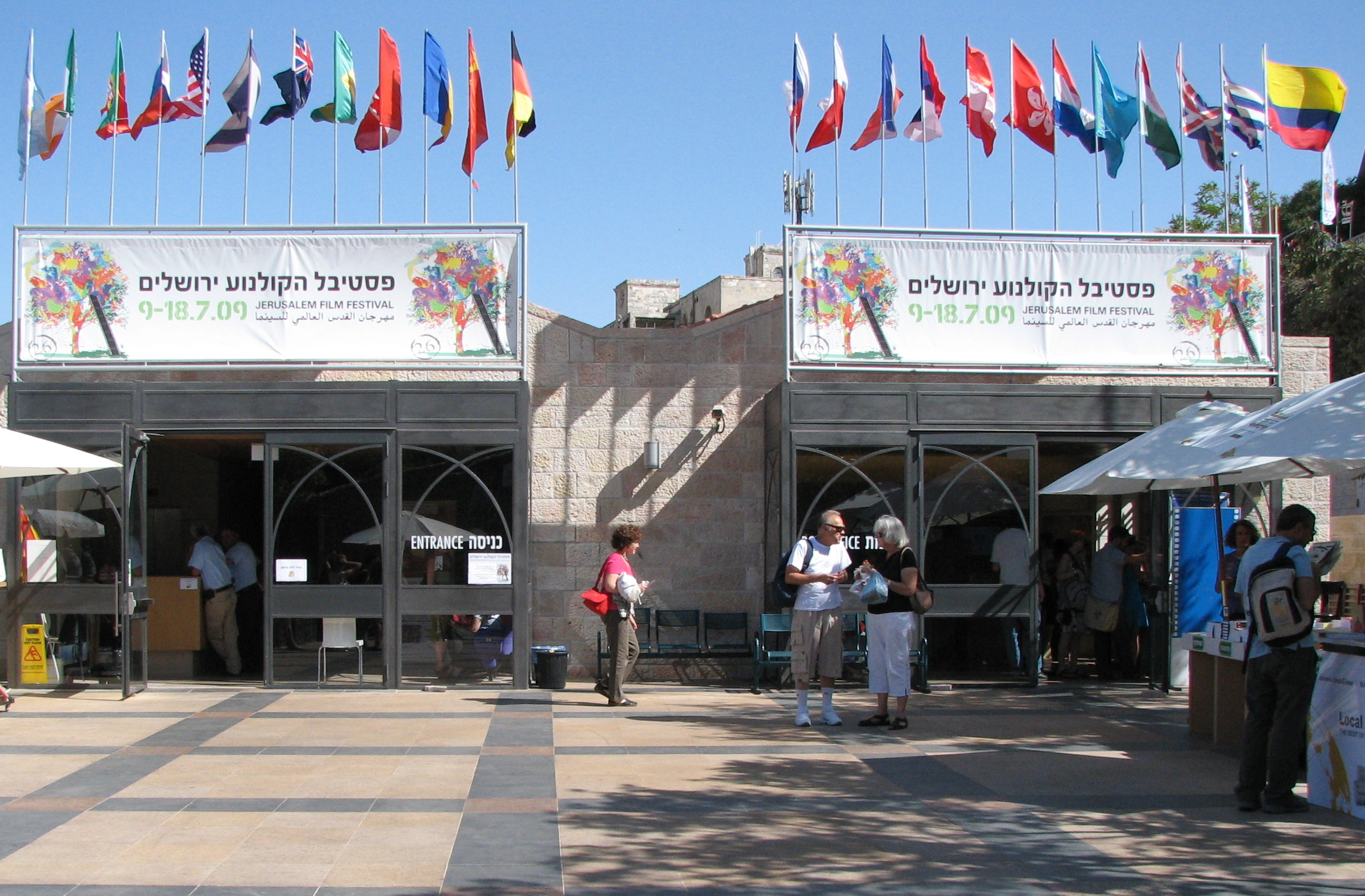
- Interactive map of Jerusalem Cinematheque
- Type: Cinematheque and Film Archive

Construction
- Built: 1973
- Opened: 1981

Website
- jer-cin.org.il

The Jerusalem Cinematheque is a cinematheque and film archive in Jerusalem.

== History ==
The Jerusalem Cinematheque was founded in 1973 by Lia van Leer. It was originally located in Beit Agron in the center of Jerusalem. A new building overlooking the walls of the Old City, close to the Hinnom Valley, was opened in 1981 with the financial support of the Ostrovsky Family Foundation, the Jerusalem Foundation, the Van Leer Foundation, and private donors.

In addition to screening halls, the Cinematheque houses the Israel Film Archive, an archive of films from the 1920s to today, The Nathan Axelrod Newsreel Collection, the Joan Sourasky-Constantiner Holocaust Multimedia Research Center, the Department for Film and Media Education, and the Lew and Edie Wasserman Film Library.

== See also ==
- List of film archives
- Tel Aviv Cinematheque
- Haifa Cinematheque
- Jerusalem Film Festival
