= Sacher Park =

Public park in Jerusalem

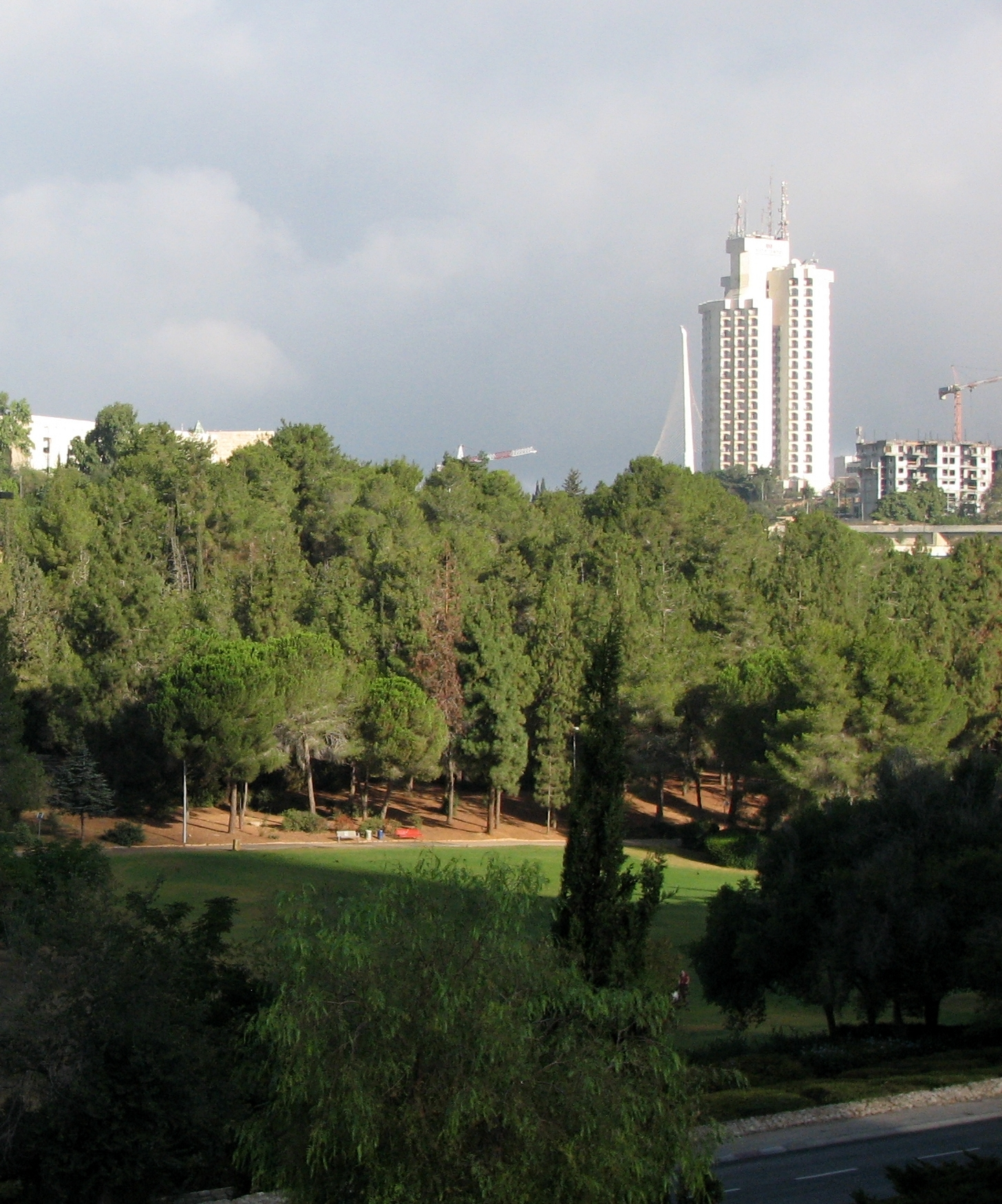
- Interactive map of Sacher Park
- Type: Urban park
- Location: Jerusalem
- Coordinates: 31°46′50″N 35°12′28″E
- Area: 163 dunams (40 acres)
- Created: 1963
- Status: Open all year

Sacher Park (Hebrew: גן סאקר, romanized: Gan Saker) is the largest public park in the center of Jerusalem, near the neighborhoods of Kiryat Wolfson and Nachlaot and adjoins the Israel Government Complex.

The park was created in 1963, and named after Harry Sacher, a significant figure in the World Zionist Organization. It was designed by Yahalom Tzur, It includes lawns, walking paths, picnic areas, playgrounds, skateboard rinks, and a dog run.

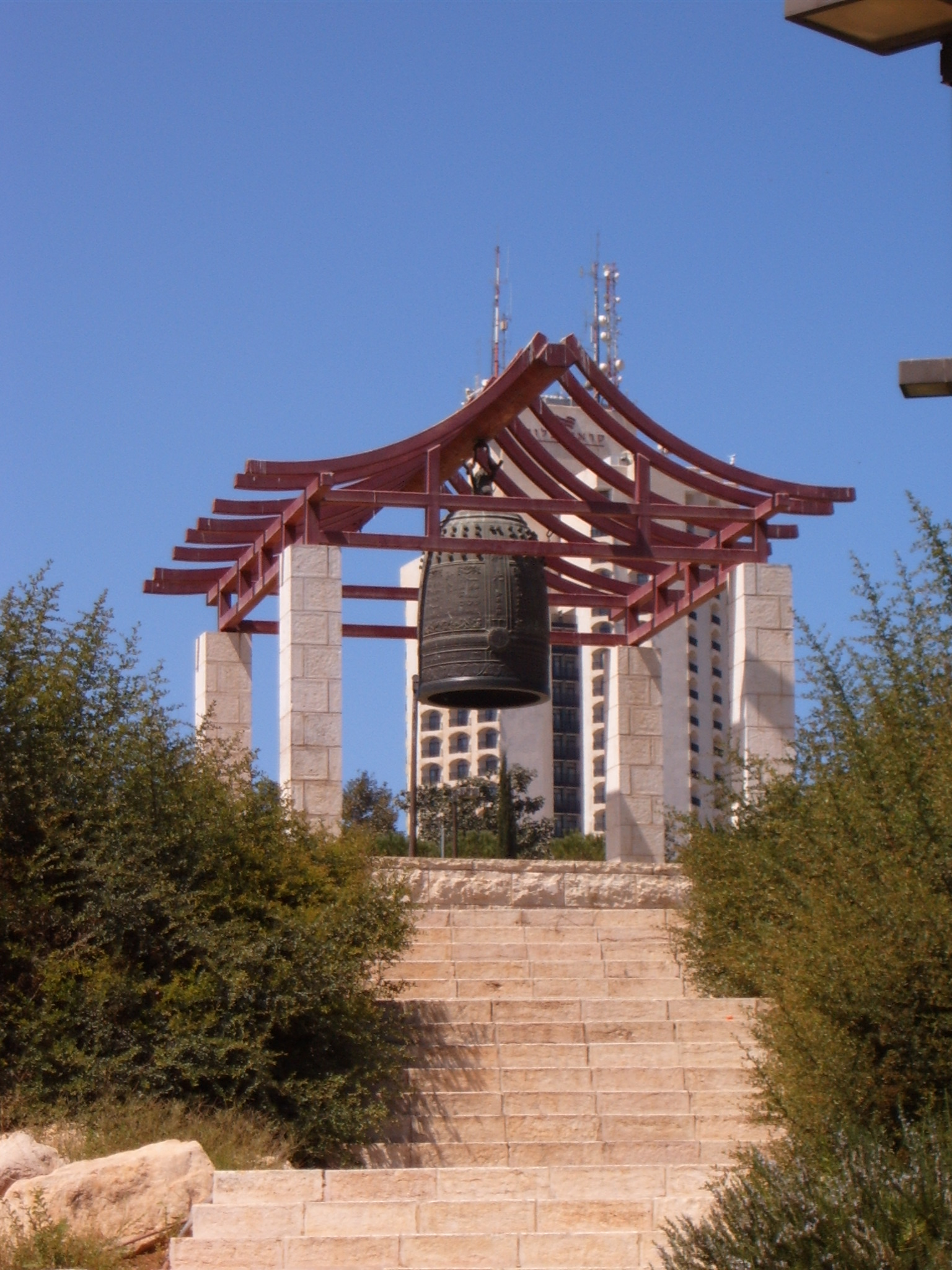
Peace bell

In April 1996, a Bonshō, a large Japanese bell, was installed in the park. It is engraved with inscriptions in Hebrew, Arabic, Japanese, and English, all containing the word “peace,” as well as an engraving of a verse from Psalms (Tehillim 122): "Pray for the peace of Jerusalem; serene will be those who love you."

== Location ==
The park is located near Givat Ram, close to the Kiryat Wolfson, Nahlaot, and Kiryat HaMemshala neighborhoods, and is part of the Kiryat HaLeom. It is part of a chain of gardens and "green belts" in the city, bordered on the west by the Wohl Rose Park and on the south by the Valley of the Cross Park. In the vicinity of the park, there several important institutions and landmarks of Jerusalem, including the Knesset, Kiryat HaMemshala, the Supreme Court of Israel, Wohl Rose Park, the Monastery of the Cross, the Israel Museum, the Slayer_ Ram campus of the Hebrew University, Bezalel Street, and the Department of Architecture of the Bezalel Academy of Arts and Design.

== History ==
During the Israeli War of Independence, the site served as an improvised airstrip for light aircraft when Jerusalem was under siege. The nearby Sheikh Badr Cemetery was also opened and operated during the war.

Before its use as an airstrip, the area of the park in the Valley of the Cross was private land, housing a concrete and construction materials factory owned by the Oz (Anza) family. It also served as a weapons cache and a fortified position during the 1936–1939 Arab revolt.

In 1949, after the war, Minister of Agriculture Levi Eshkol initiated the transformation of the rocky valley into agricultural land. In July 1949, members of Kibbutz Ma'ale HaHamisha began cultivating 350 dunams for vegetable farming, irrigated with wastewater from Jerusalem. In 1955, a decision was made to convert the Valley of the Cross and the northern valley into an urban park. Agricultural activity ceased, and as compensation, the kibbutzim Ma'ale HaHamisha and Kiryat Anavim received alternative land in the southwest of the city in the Gazelle Valley, which was developed into an apple orchard.

The park's construction began in 1960, following a donation of 20,000 lira by Harry Sacher, a British Zionist activist and member of the Zionist Executive, during his visit to Israel.

Phase I of the park was completed in 1962, designed by landscape architects Lipa Yahalom and Dan Zur in the style of an English park. In early 1964, large lawns, shrubs, and trees were planted, with dozens of olive and carob trees brought from the Jerusalem hills.

The park's inauguration ceremony was held on 13 October 1965.

In 1971, Mimouna celebrations were held for the first time in "Sacher Park," initiated by Shaul Ben-Shimon, chairman of the "Association of Moroccan Immigrants," and have since become an annual event.

In 1988, Eliezer Schlesinger was murdered in the park.

== Facilities ==
The park attracts various recreational and sports activities. It features basketball and soccer fields (Kraft Field), a skateboarding and roller-skating area, children's playgrounds, and fitness equipment. The central lawn is used for informal soccer games, baseball and football matches played by young American expatriates in the city, as well as cricket and frisbee. The surrounding paths include running and cycling trails. Additionally, the park has a designated off-leash dog area.

In early September 2018, a café from the "Gan Sipur" chain was inaugurated in the park, next to the basketball courts and skatepark. Adjacent to it is a small amphitheater named after Arnan Yekutieli, a former city council member.

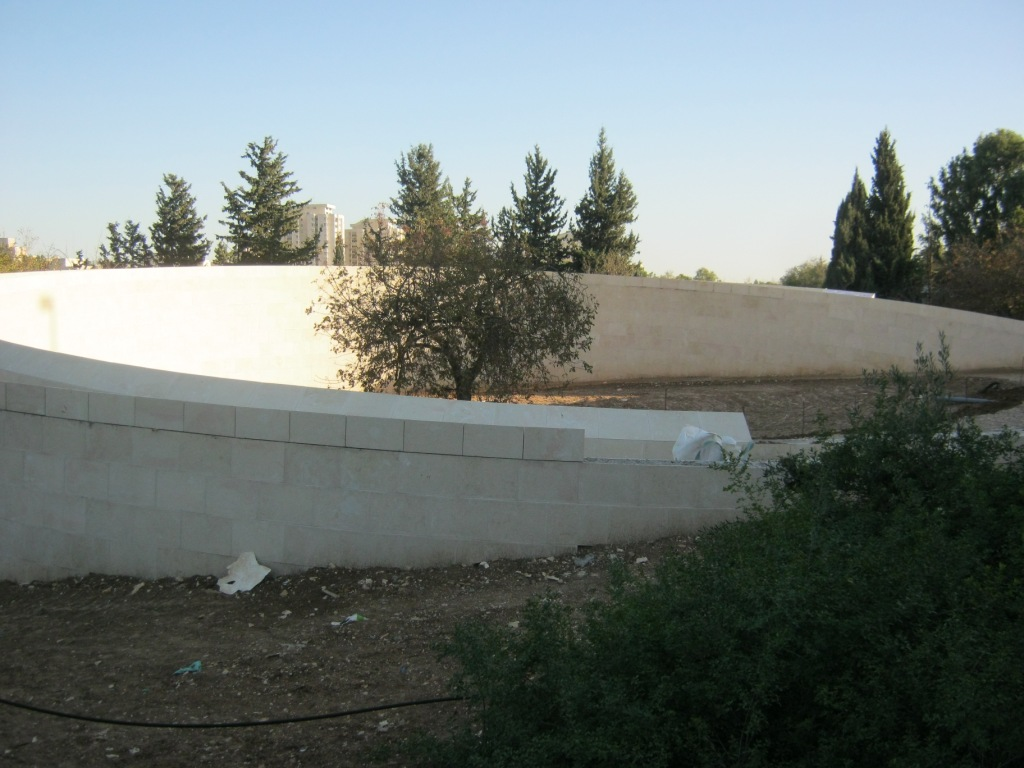
Harel Brigade Memorial

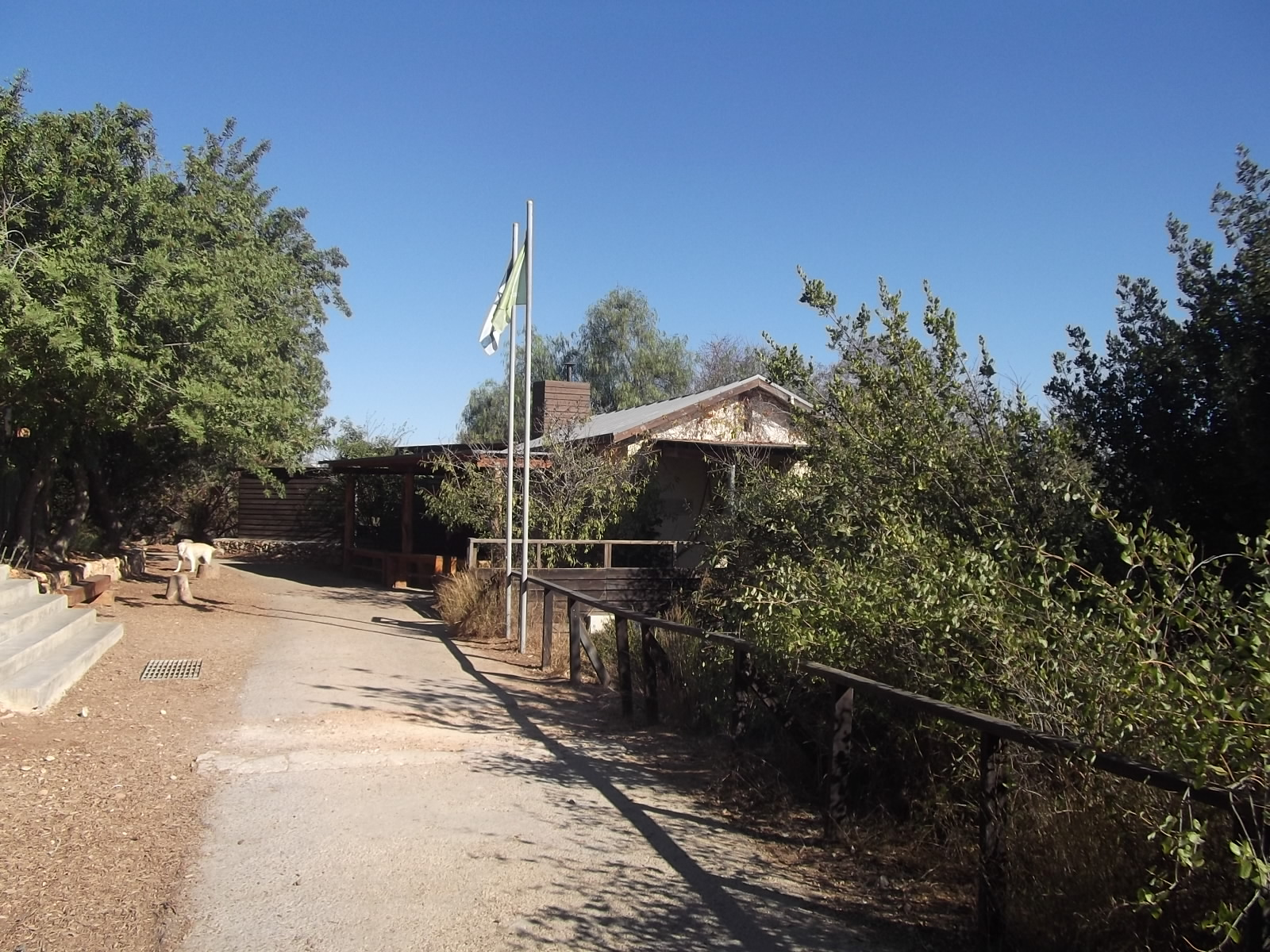
Jerusalem Bird Observatory

On the park's outskirts, near the Knesset, are the Jerusalem Bird Observatory, a memorial for the fallen soldiers of the Harel Brigade in the War of Independence, and the Candle of Remembrance monument honoring the victims of the Siege of Leningrad.

In summer 2019, a major renovation project began, with an estimated cost of 45 million shekels. The renovations included demolishing part of Kraft Field in the elevated northern section to construct a covered water reservoir, building a TRX fitness area, adding new cycling and running paths, constructing a modern playground, installing Wi-Fi throughout the park, renewing the park’s vegetation and irrigation systems, upgrading park furniture and public restrooms, and adding fountains. Most of the work was completed in November 2021, at a final cost of 75 million shekels.
