= Kiryat HaLeom =

Coordinates: 31°47′2.55″N 35°12′1.95″E

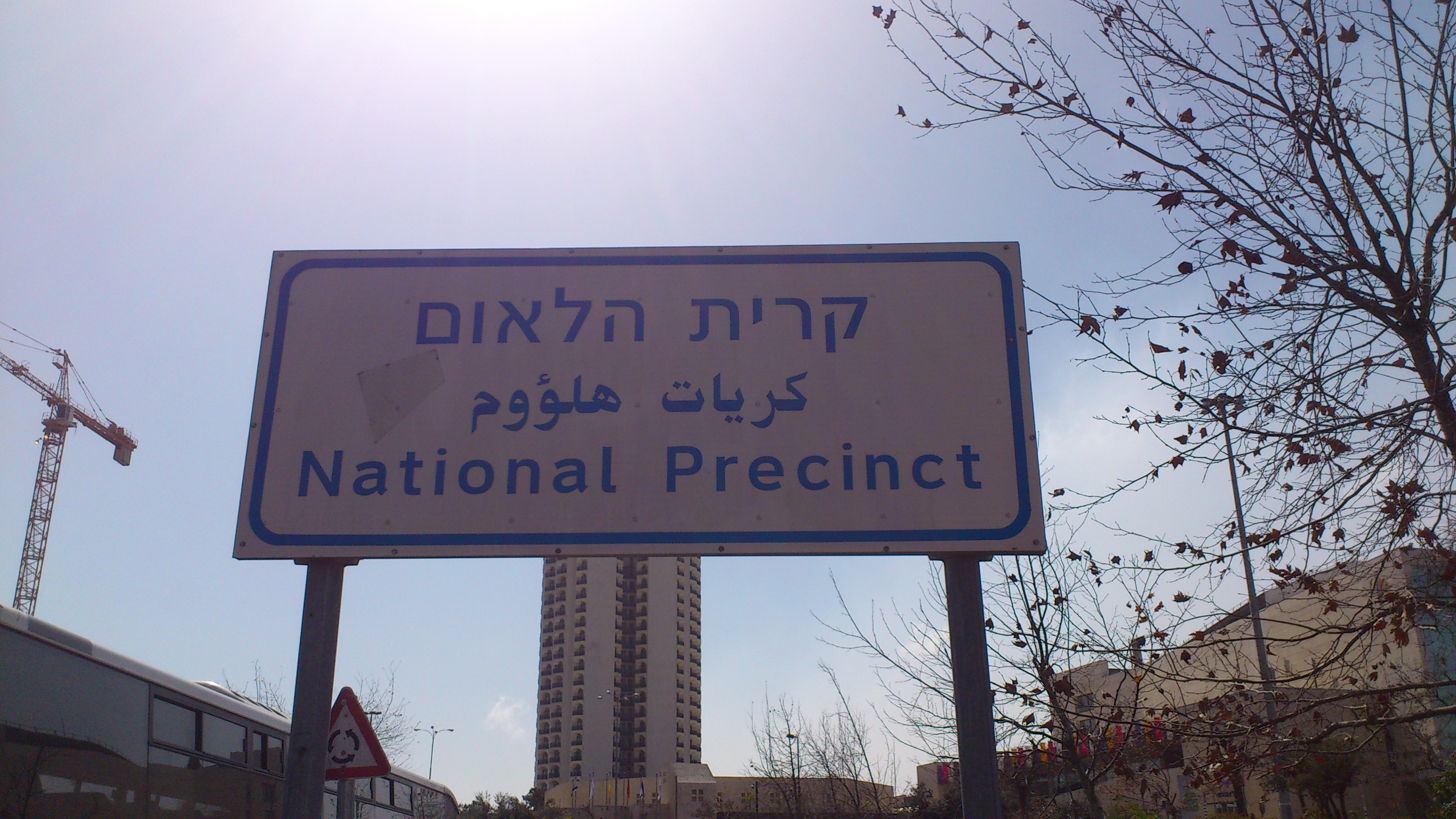
Kiryat HaLeom

Kiryat HaLeom (Hebrew: קרית הלאום), also known as Kiryat HaUma (Hebrew: קרית האומה) and referred to in English as the National Precinct, is the official label of a complex in central Jerusalem that includes Kiryat HaMemshala (the government precinct), the Knesset (parliament), Sacher Park, the Menorah Garden, Wohl Rose Park and Binyanei HaUma convention center. It was traditionally considered to be the northern part of the Givat Ram neighborhood.

== Project overview ==
The project was started in the 1990s and the compound is planned to include all government institutions of the State of Israel. It currently includes the Bank of Israel, the Bloomfield Museum of Science, the Ministry of Interior, the Ministry of Finance, the Office of the Prime Minister and the Supreme Court. Future buildings will house the National Archives, the National Gallery, and the National Library, plus new buildings for the National Headquarters of the Police and the State Comptroller offices. The official guesthouse for diplomats (like Blair House in Washington, D.C.) will be built next to Binyenei HaUma convention center.

The project is aimed to be completed in 20 years. The plans also include the construction of Kikar HaLeom, a national square adjacent to the Office of the Prime Minister, as well as a national boulevard leading to the square. Rova Mevo Ha'ir is a project to build a new main entrance to Jerusalem that goes from the Kiryat HaLeom area, northward to the entrance of the city from Highway 1.

In 2010 the Israeli government signed an agreement with a Dutch architectural firm that should plan the whole area in a 20-year process. At the same time the Government signed an agreement with Israeli architects for the project of connecting the city entrance to the northern side of Kiryat HaLeom.

== National Square ==
A new square is planned to be built next to the new Prime Minister's Office with a new road that will be the "national boulevard". The square is planned to be the location of national monuments and national symbols. It would also serve as meeting grounds for national parades.

== National Square parking building ==
A new building opened in 2004 to provide parking spaces for 1,800 state employees and diplomats. The building includes a police station, fire station, bank, and a local branch of the Council for a Beautiful Israel that is planned to be an educational center for environmental studies.

== See also ==
- Givat Ram
- Kiryat HaMemshala
