= Talansky =

Talansky is a surname. Notable people with the surname include:

- Andrew Talansky (born 1988), American professional triathlete
- Morris Talansky (1933–2025), American businessman and Orthodox rabbi
