= Morris Talansky =

American businessman and Orthodox rabbi (1933–2025)

- מוריס טלנסקי
- Born: January 27, 1933
- Died: June 2, 2025 (aged 92)
- Other name: Moshe
- Education: Yeshiva University (1954)
- Occupation: Businessman
- Years active: 1954–2025
- Organization: Jerusalem Foundation
- Spouse: 2
- Children: 3

Morris "Moshe" Talansky (Hebrew: מוריס (משה) טלנסקי; January 27, 1933 – June 2, 2025) was an American businessman and Orthodox rabbi who co-founded the New Jerusalem Foundation with Ehud Olmert, who was the Prime Minister of Israel from 2006 to 2009.

== Background ==
After graduating from Yeshiva University in 1954, Talansky was ordained a rabbi and went on to study law at a New York law school. Talansky and his first wife, Marion, have three children: Yitzhak (Alan), a dentist and lecturer at Jerusalem's Machon Lev college and a father of eleven children; Bracha Tova (Barbara), a psychologist living in Ra'anana; and Ruth, an architect living in the U.S. In 1996, after 40 years of marriage, the couple divorced. Talansky lived with his second wife, Helen, in Woodsburgh, Long Island. He also had an apartment in Wolfson Towers, a high-rise apartment complex overlooking Sacher Park and the Knesset.

Talansky died on June 2, 2025, at the age of 92.

== Business and fundraising activities ==
Talansky owned Trans Global Resources, which he founded in April 1998. He was registered as sole shareholder and director of the company, which provides investment consulting and business services. It also deals in real estate investments.

Talansky was executive director of the American Committee for Shaare Zedek Medical Center for over 20 years, raising large sums for the hospital. He stopped working for Shaare Zedek in 1997. Over the years, Talansky made contributions to the campaigns of Rudy Giuliani and George Bush. He mostly donated sums of $1,000. He was a past board member of Yeshiva University.

== Olmert-Talansky affair ==
Talansky was a longtime acquaintance of former prime minister Ehud Olmert. They knew each other before Olmert was elected Mayor of Jerusalem. Olmert used to call Talansky "my dear old friend," and his aides referred to him as "Mr. T."

In May 2008, when Olmert was investigated for alleged briberies, Talansky was one of two pivotal witnesses. The other major witness, Olmert's long-time associate and former partner in their Jerusalem law firm, attorney Uri Messer, allegedly handled the transfer of cash between Talansky and Olmert. Talansky was named as one of the contributors to Olmert's mayoral campaign in 1998.
