= JBO =

JBO may refer to:

- JBO (band), a German heavy metal band
- Jay Bouwmeester (born 1983), Canadian professional ice hockey player
- Jean-Baptiste Ouédraogo, President of Upper Volta from November 1982 until August 1983
- Jerusalem Bird Observatory, Israel
- Jodrell Bank Observatory, UK
- Junior Boy's Own, a record label
- Junk Bond Observatory
- Lojban (ISO 639 code: jbo), a constructed language
