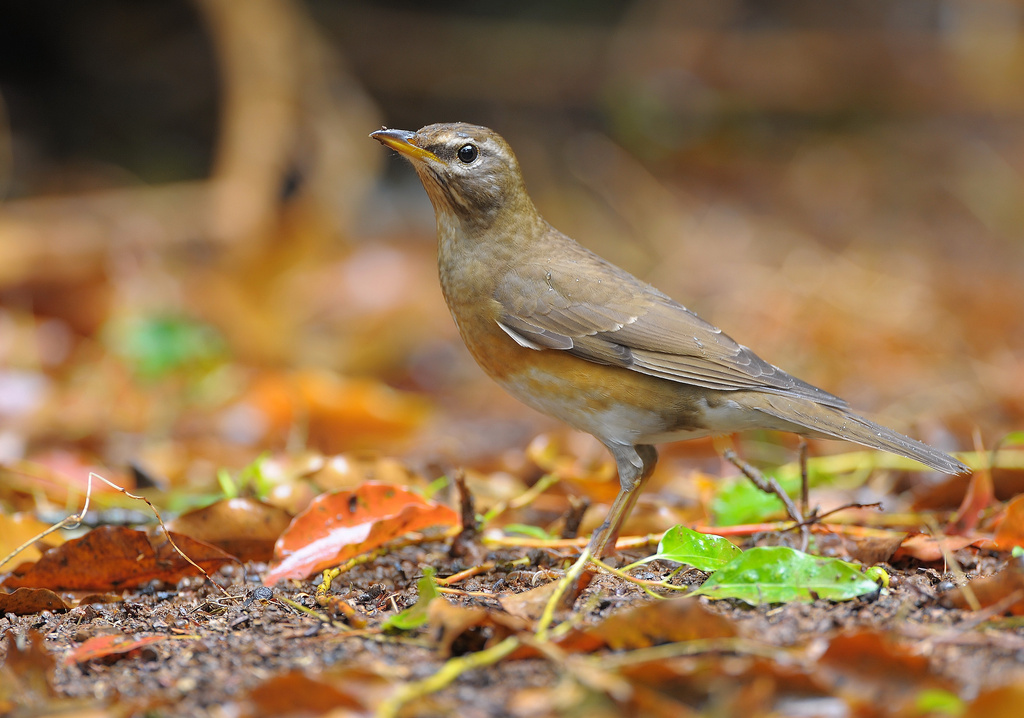

Conservation status
- Least Concern (IUCN 3.1)

Scientific classification
- Kingdom: Animalia
- Phylum: Chordata
- Class: Aves
- Order: Passeriformes
- Family: Turdidae
- Genus: Turdus
- Species: T. obscurus

Binomial name
- Turdus obscurus Gmelin, JF, 1789

= Eyebrowed thrush =

Eyebrowed thrush Temporal range: 0.09–0 Ma Late Pleistocene – present

Species of bird

The eyebrowed thrush (Turdus obscurus) is a member of the thrush family Turdidae. It breeds in dense coniferous forest and taiga eastwards from Siberia and Mongolia to Japan. It is strongly migratory, wintering south to China and Southeast Asia. It is a rare vagrant to western Europe.

== Taxonomy ==
The eyebrowed thrush was formally described in 1789 by the German naturalist Johann Friedrich Gmelin in his revised and expanded edition of Carl Linnaeus's Systema Naturae. He placed it with the thrushes in the genus Turdus and coined the binomial name Turdus obscurus. The scientific name comes from Latin Turdus meaning "thrush" and obscurus meaning "dark" or "dusky". Gmelin based his account on the "Dark thrush" that had been described in 1783 by the English ornithologist John Latham in his multi-volume work A General Synopsis of Birds. Latham noted that "This is Sibirian species and found in the woods beyond Lake Baikal" but did not explain the source of his information. The species is monotypic: no subspecies are recognised.

== Description ==
This is an attractive thrush, with a grey back and head, the latter having a black eyeline, bordered white above and below. The breast and flanks are orange, and the belly white. The sexes are fairly similar, but immatures have a browner back.

The male has a simple whistling song, similar to the related mistle thrush.

== Behaviour ==
It nests in trees, laying 4-6 eggs in a neat nest. Migrating birds and wintering birds often form small flocks. It is omnivorous, eating a wide range of insects, earthworms and berries.

In 2007 an eyebrowed thrush was sighted at the Jerusalem Bird Observatory in Jerusalem. This is the second recorded sighting in Israel; the first was at Eilat in October 1996.

In 2011, an eyebrowed thrush was sighted in Australia, near Malanda in Queensland. This is possibly the first confirmed sighting of the species on the Australian mainland.

== Fossil record ==
In 2017, an assessment of late Pleistocene Indonesian passerines found a fossil of this species.

== Gallery ==
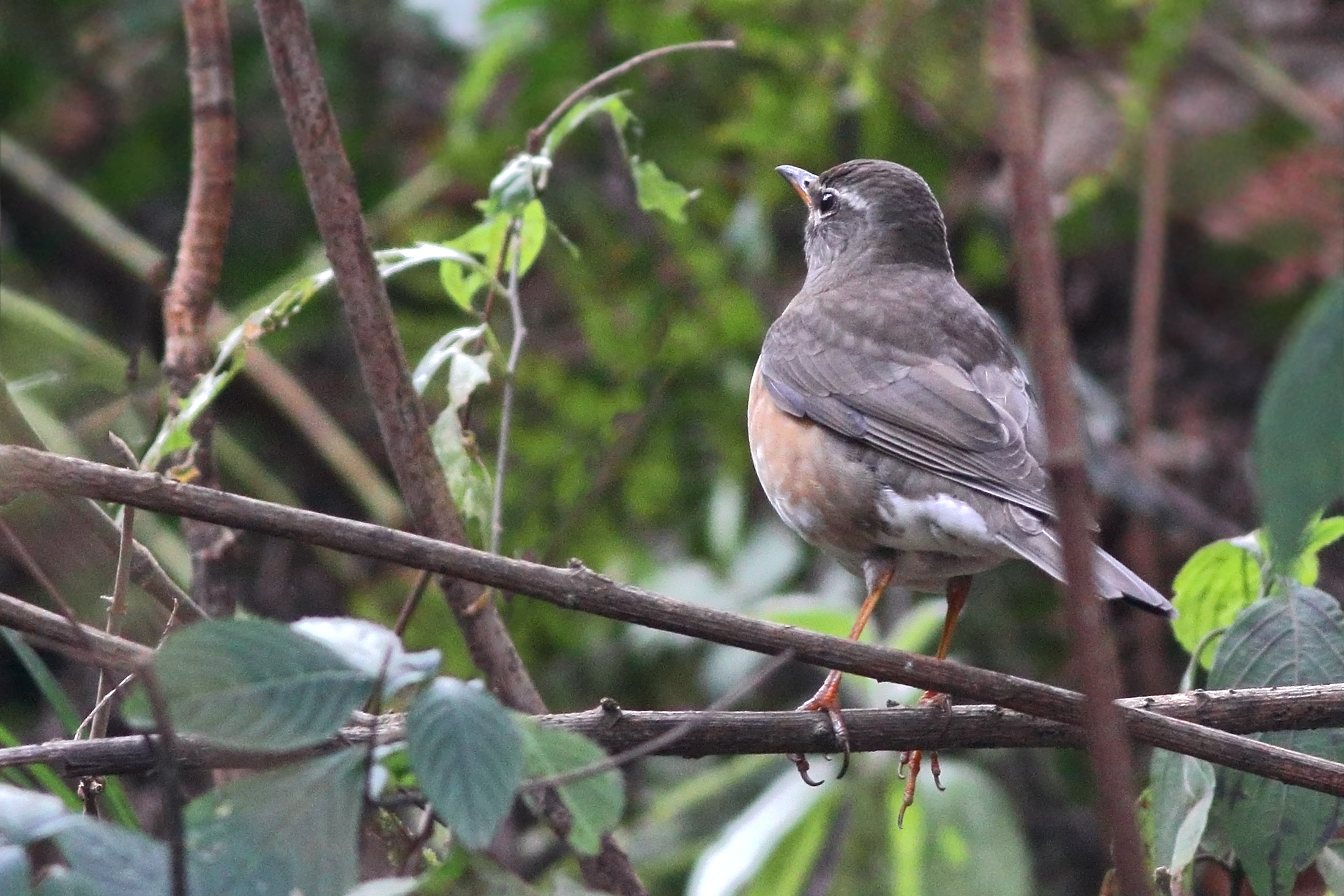

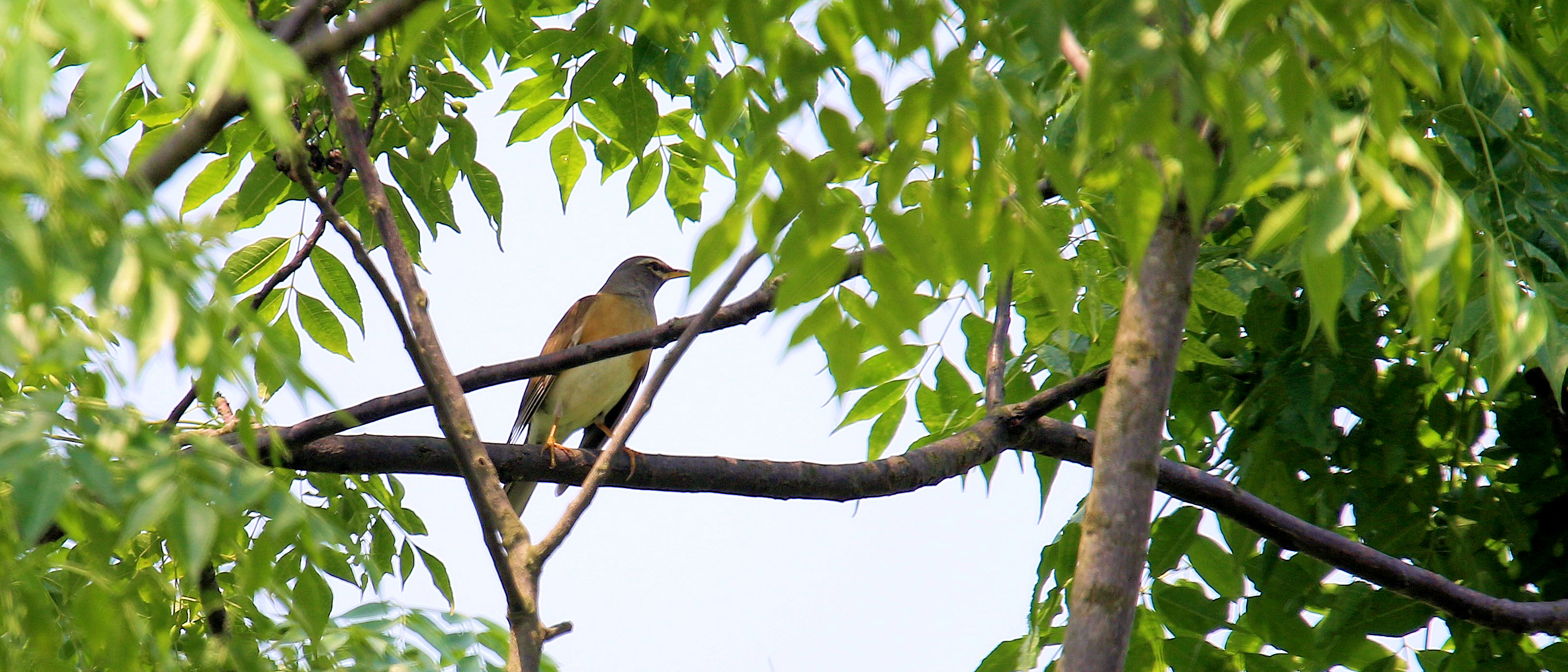
Eyebrowed thrush from Khonoma village in Nagaland, India

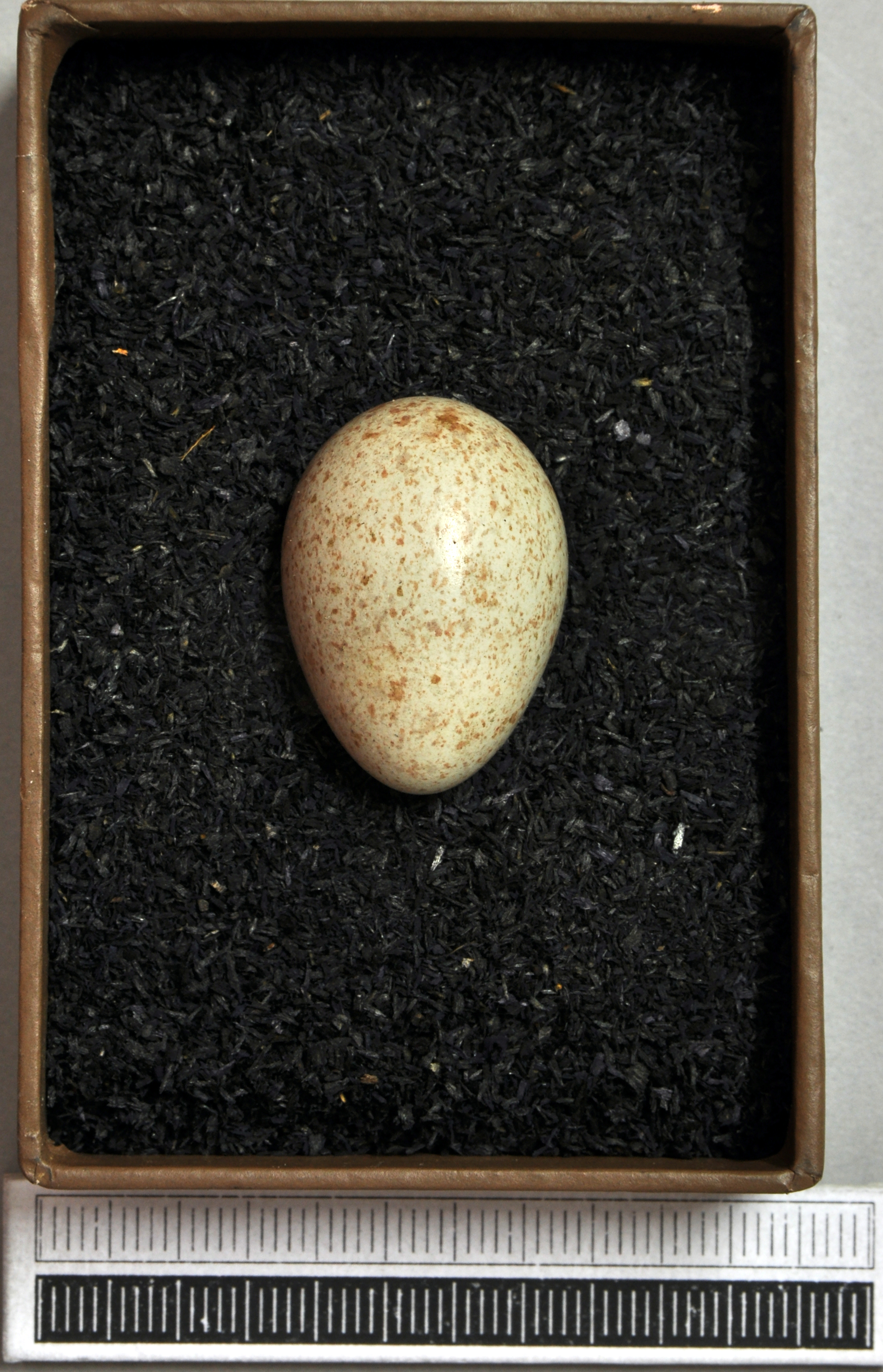
Egg, Collection Museum Wiesbaden
