= Prime Minister's Office (Israel) =

Office of the Prime Minister of Israel

- משרד ראש הממשלה

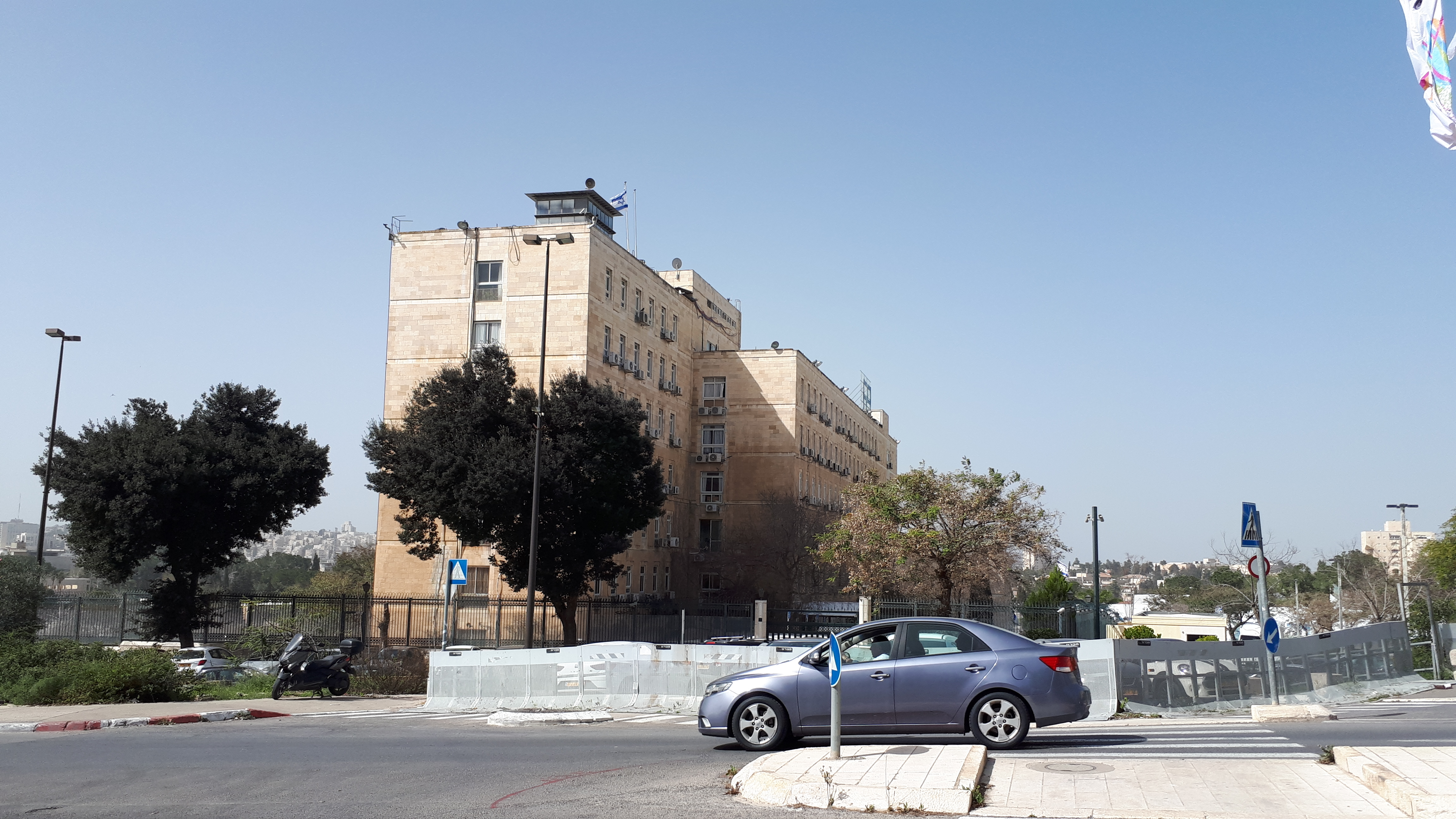
- Headquarters of the Prime Minister's Office in Kiryat HaMemshala, Kiryat HaLeom, Jerusalem.

Agency overview
- Formed: 1948
- Jurisdiction: Government of Israel
- Minister responsible: Benjamin Netanyahu, Prime Minister of Israel
- Agency executive: Yossi Shelley, Director-General
- Website: pmo.gov.il

Israeli Prime Minister's Office (Hebrew: מִשְׂרָד רֹאשׁ הַמֶּמְשָׁלָה, Misrad Rosh HaMemshala) is the Israeli cabinet department responsible for coordinating the work of all governmental ministry offices and assisting the Israeli prime minister in their daily work.

The Prime Minister's Office is responsible for formulating the Israeli cabinet's policy, conducting its cabinet meetings, as well as responsible for the foreign diplomatic relations with countries around the world, and supervising and overseeing the implementation of the Cabinet's policy. In addition, it is in charge of other governmental bodies, which are directly under the Prime Minister's responsibilities. Unlike many other countries, the Office of the Prime Minister of Israel does not serve as their residence.

The official residence of the prime minister of Israel is in Beit Aghion, in Jerusalem's Rehavia neighborhood.

== Subdivisions ==
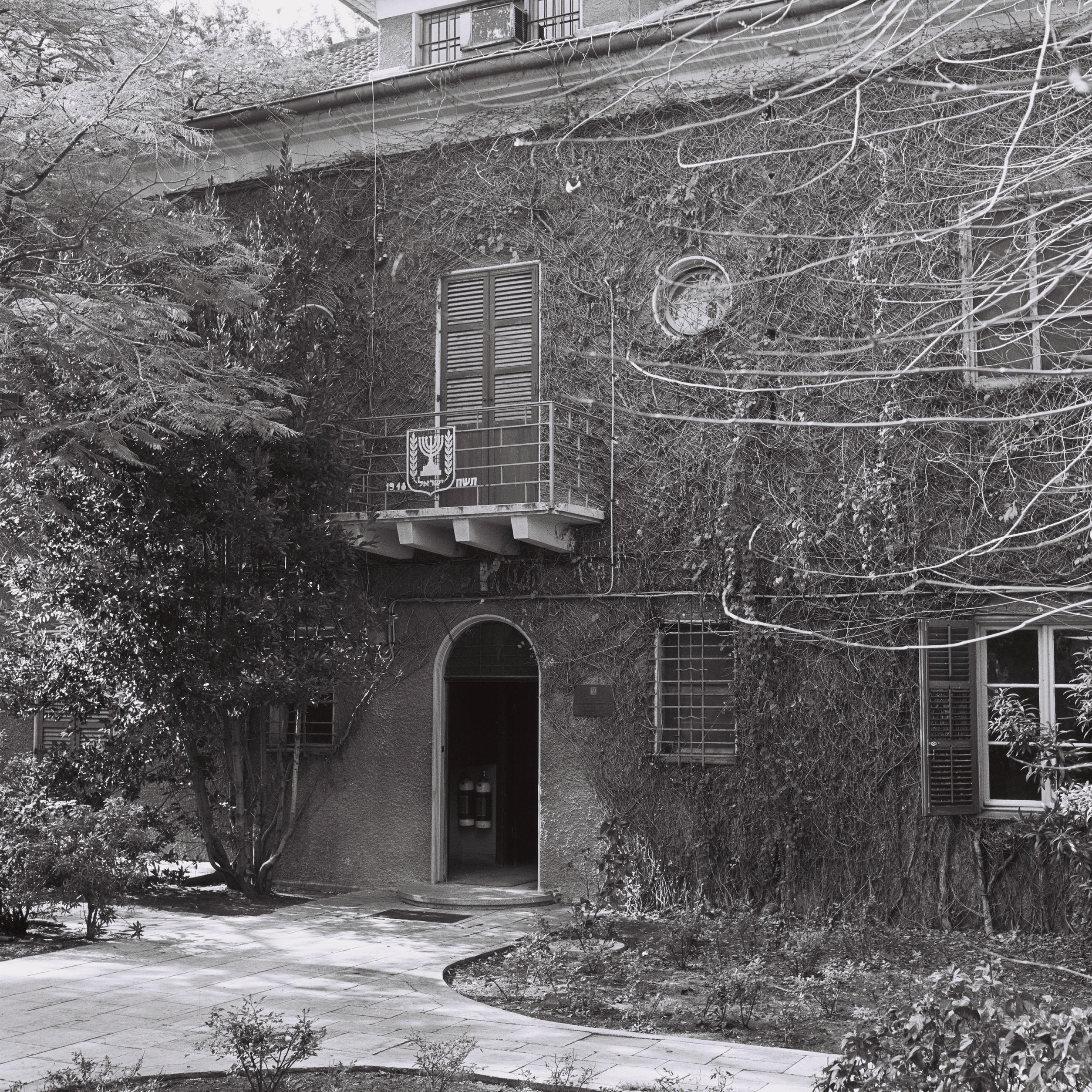
Prime Minister's Office in Tel Aviv, 1964

- Israel Atudot Department – responsible for the administration of Israel Atudot, a national plan for improving Israel's human capital.
- Alternative Fuels Administration – responsible for the administration of the Fuel Choices and Smart Mobility Initiative, a national plan for the development of alternative fuels and advanced transportation in Israel.
- Atomic Energy Commission – responsible for the nuclear activities of Israel.
- Conversion Authority – provides assistance and services for persons seeking to convert to Judaism.
- Department of Home Affairs, Planning and Development – responsible for the formalization and operationalization of plans and strategies for national development in Israel, as well as for government relations with the Israeli and Jewish diaspora.
- Division of the Inspector General for State Audit – responsible for implementing the recommendations of the State Comptroller of Israel.
- Government ICT Authority - responsible for the provision of electronic government services.
- Government Naming Committee – determines the Hebrew names for the Israeli geographical places, and its decisions are binding for all state institutions.
- Government Press Office – responsible for the provision of journalist diplomas for Israeli mass media workers and giving journalist visa to foreign journalists staying in Israel. In addition, it is in charge of coordinating between the Cabinet of Israel and the foreign journalist community staying in Israel on media activities matters.
- Israel Central Bureau of Statistics – responsible to carry out research and publish statistical data on all aspects of Israeli life, including population, society, economy, industry, education and physical infrastructure, that will serve the legislature and the public.
- Israel National Cyber Directorate – responsible for providing cybersecurity defence to Israel and coordinating Israel's responses to cyberattacks.
- Israel Institute for Biological Research – engaged in research of biology, microbiology, and chemistry, and is known for developing preemptive defendable means against biological and chemical weapons.
- Israel State Archive – Israel's national archive institution.
- Legal Department – responsible for providing legal advice and services to the Prime Minister's Office.
- Ministry of Strategic Affairs – coordinates security, intelligence and diplomatic initiatives against strategic threats to Israel.
- Mossad – foreign intelligence agency of Israel.
- Shin Bet – internal security service of Israel.
- National Economic Council – provides economic counselling to the Prime Minister of Israel, and assisting them with formulating economic policy, while designated to focus on the long term planning.
- Nativ - governmental liaison organization that maintains contact with Jews living in the countries of the former Soviet Union and encouraging aliyah, immigration to Israel.
- National Security Council of Israel – provides national security counselling to the Prime Minister of Israel, security recommendations to the Cabinet of Israel, guiding and coordinating between the various security bodies of Israel, supervising and overseeing the implementation of the decisions concerning the various security bodies.
- Public Affairs Department – responsible for public relations efforts and initiatives of the Prime Minister's Office.
- Public Council for the Commemoration of Theodor Herzl – responsible for activities commemorating Theodor Herzl.
- Supervisor for Implementation of the Freedom of Information Law – responsible for administrating Israel's freedom of information legislation.

== See also ==
- Beit Aghion
- Minister in the Prime Minister's Office
- Prime Minister of Israel
