= Jerusalem Foundation =

Israeli foundation

The Jerusalem Foundation
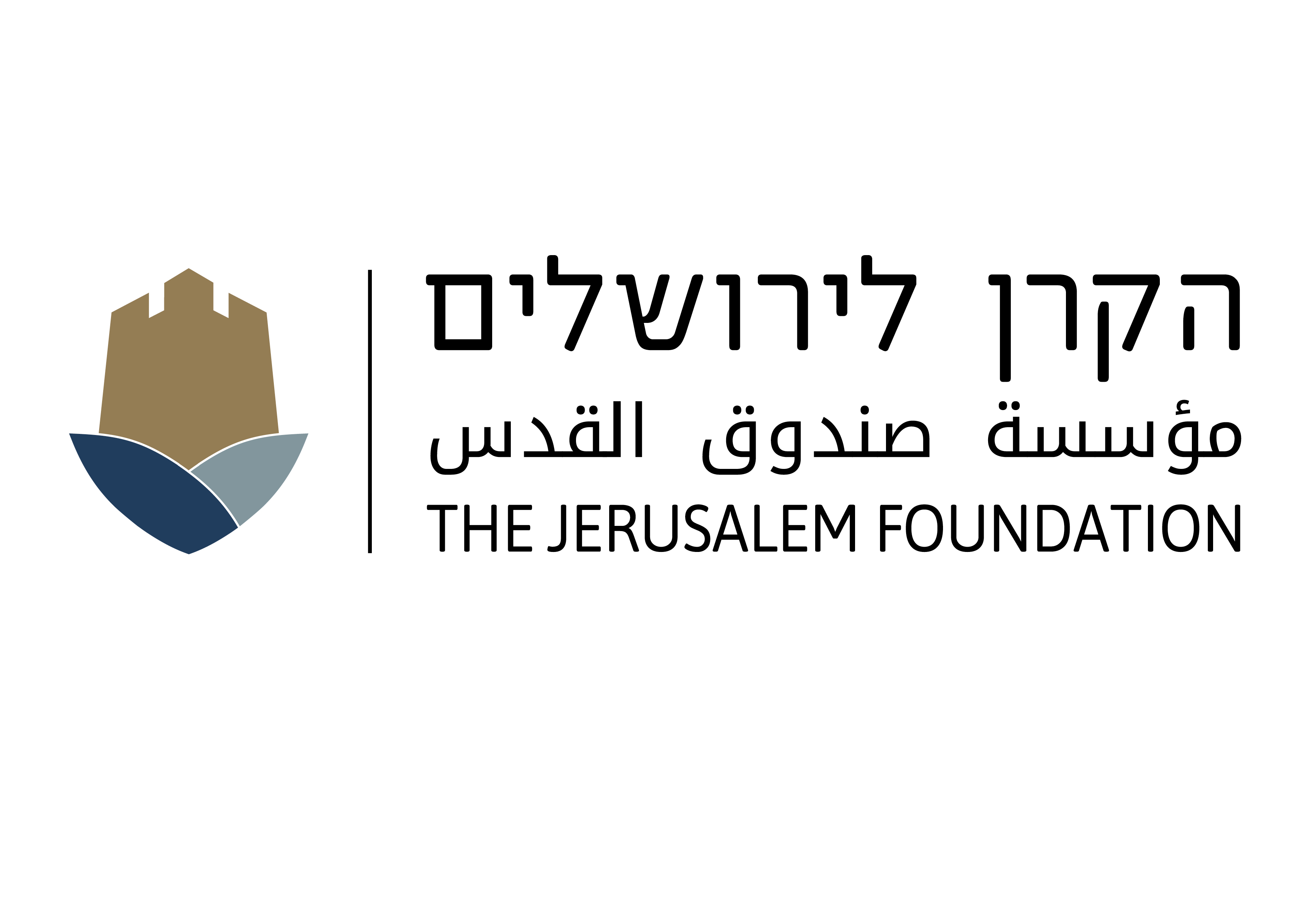
- Founded: 1966
- Founder: Teddy Kollek
- Type: Nonprofit foundation
- Purpose: Community development, culture, Jewish-Arab coexistence
- Region served: Jerusalem
- Key people: Arik (Aharon) Grebelsky, president
- Revenue: $25 million annually
- Website: jerusalemfoundation.org

The Jerusalem Foundation (Hebrew: הקרן לירושלים, HaKeren LiYerushalayim; Arabic: مؤسسة صندوق القدس) is a nonprofit foundation that promotes the development of the city of Jerusalem, by raising funds for social, cultural and beautification projects. Established in 1966 by West Jerusalem mayor Teddy Kollek, it has contributed hundreds of millions of dollars to the city's budget and established parks, gardens, forests, recreational sites, theaters, and museums; restored ancient sites, synagogues, mosques, and churches; funded community and social centers, preschool centers, and health clinics; and sponsored archeological excavations, scholarships, and cultural events.

== History ==
When Kollek became mayor of Jerusalem in 1965, it was a divided city, separated into Arab and Jewish sectors as a result of the 1949 Armistice Agreements. One of Kollek's objectives for The Jerusalem Foundation was to build world Jewry's support for the development of Jerusalem. At the time, the city suffered from poverty and overcrowding, with much of the population living in housing projects. Hardly any neighborhoods had a park or playground. The Jerusalem Foundation's first initiative was the establishment of public parks in a few of the city's poorest neighborhoods, with funds donated by New York supporters. Since its inception, the Foundation has furnished playgrounds and flower gardens for nearly every Jerusalem neighborhood, contributing 350 out of the more than 1,000 parks, gardens and green spaces in the city.

Politically, Kollek viewed the Foundation as a tool for pushing projects past a city council that was unable or unwilling to support them. Kollek also leveraged matching funds from the municipality, government ministries, and non-governmental organizations for Foundation projects.

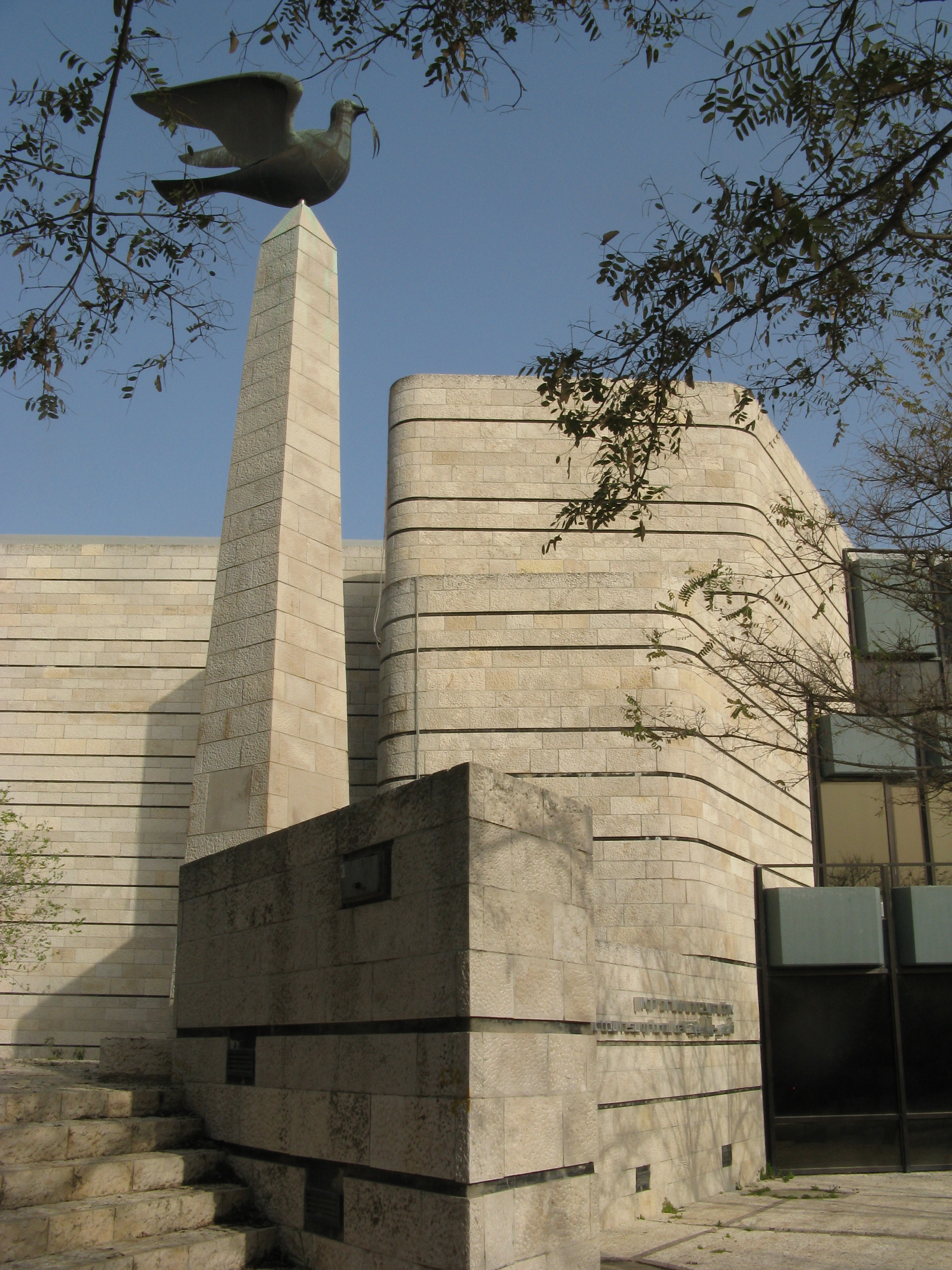
Henry Crown Symphony Hall

While the Foundation is chaired by the mayor of Jerusalem, it is independent of the Finance Ministry and state-related charities such as the Jewish Agency and World Zionist Organization. From the donors' point of view, this means more transparency for their contributions. Unlike state-sponsored charities like the United Jewish Appeal, for example, in which donations are funneled directly into Finance Ministry coffers, donors know exactly what they are supporting with their contributions to The Jerusalem Foundation. This transparency has given the name to such projects as the Tisch Family Zoological Gardens, the Walter and Elise Haas Promenade, the Vivienne and Maurice Wohl Rose Park, and the Rebecca Crown Auditorium and Henry Crown Symphony Hall at the Jerusalem Theater, among many others.

The Jerusalem Foundation became a model for the Tel Aviv Foundation, which Tel Aviv mayor Shlomo Lahat established in 1977 upon the advice of Kollek. Similar models have been established by other Israeli cities.

== Organizational structure ==
Arik (Aharon) Grebelsky was appointed president of the Jerusalem Foundation effective 1 January 2025, following the death of Shai Doron.

The organizational structure of The Jerusalem Foundation includes a General Assembly staffed by leading business and academic figures in Jerusalem and around the world. The General Assembly meets biannually to discuss the financial outlays and work plan of the Foundation. It also elects the members of the Board of Directors, which convenes every four to six weeks to supervise activities in the areas of overseas/fundraising, projects, technical and finance. The Jerusalem Foundation's Israeli leadership can be found here, and leadership can be found here.

The Jerusalem Foundation is politically unaffiliated. Based in Jerusalem, it maintains fund-raising desks in the United States, the United Kingdom, Germany, France, Spain, Italy and Canada. It holds regular fundraising events in major Jewish centers. It has awarded its Teddy Kollek Award annually since 1999 to those who have "made outstanding contributions to advancing the social, cultural, educational, and physical development of the city of Jerusalem".

Founding president Ruth Cheshin served in this capacity from 1966 to 2011. She was succeeded in October 2011 by Mark Sofer, a former Israeli ambassador to Ireland and India followed by Yohanna Arbib-Perugia. Nir Barkat, while mayor of Jerusalem, was an honorary chairman of The Jerusalem Foundation, and Israeli politician Sallai Meridor is the international chairman.

== Revenues ==
Between 1966 and 1980, revenue from The Jerusalem Foundation accounted for 16 to 20 percent of the municipal budget. Between 1966 and 1991, The Jerusalem Foundation contributed $245 million to the city's development. Between 1991 and 1996, its income from contributions was estimated at $20 million per year. In the early 2000s, this figure increased to $30 million per year. In 2011 revenue was $25 million.

The Jerusalem Foundation's 2010 annual report stated that it has raised over $800 million between 1966 and 2010. The Jerusalem Foundation's Annual Reports can be found on its website here.

== Projects ==
As of 2018 The Jerusalem Foundation has funded over 4,000 projects. It has built many gardens, parks and woodlands throughout the city, as well as recreational sites. It has sponsored restorations of ancient and historic sites – notably the Jewish Quarter in the Old City – and renovated synagogues, mosques, and churches. It has funded community and social centers, preschool centers, and health clinics; provided studios and housing for visiting artists and intellectuals; and sponsored archeological excavations, scholarships, artists workshops, and a wide variety of cultural events.

The Jerusalem Foundation has also contributed to Arab neighborhoods. As mayor, Kollek often solicited overseas donors through The Jerusalem Foundation to pay for projects in the Arab sector that the city could not sponsor and the national government refused to fund. The Jerusalem Foundation sponsored the Sheikh Jarrah Health Centre, "a Beit Hanina sports field, playgrounds in several Arab neighborhoods, and improvements at Abdallah Ibn Hussein Technology School, which enabled the school to become an accredited technical college". It also sponsored Hand in Hand: Center for Jewish Arab Education in Israel, which promotes coexistence between Jews and Arabs.

=== Flagship projects ===
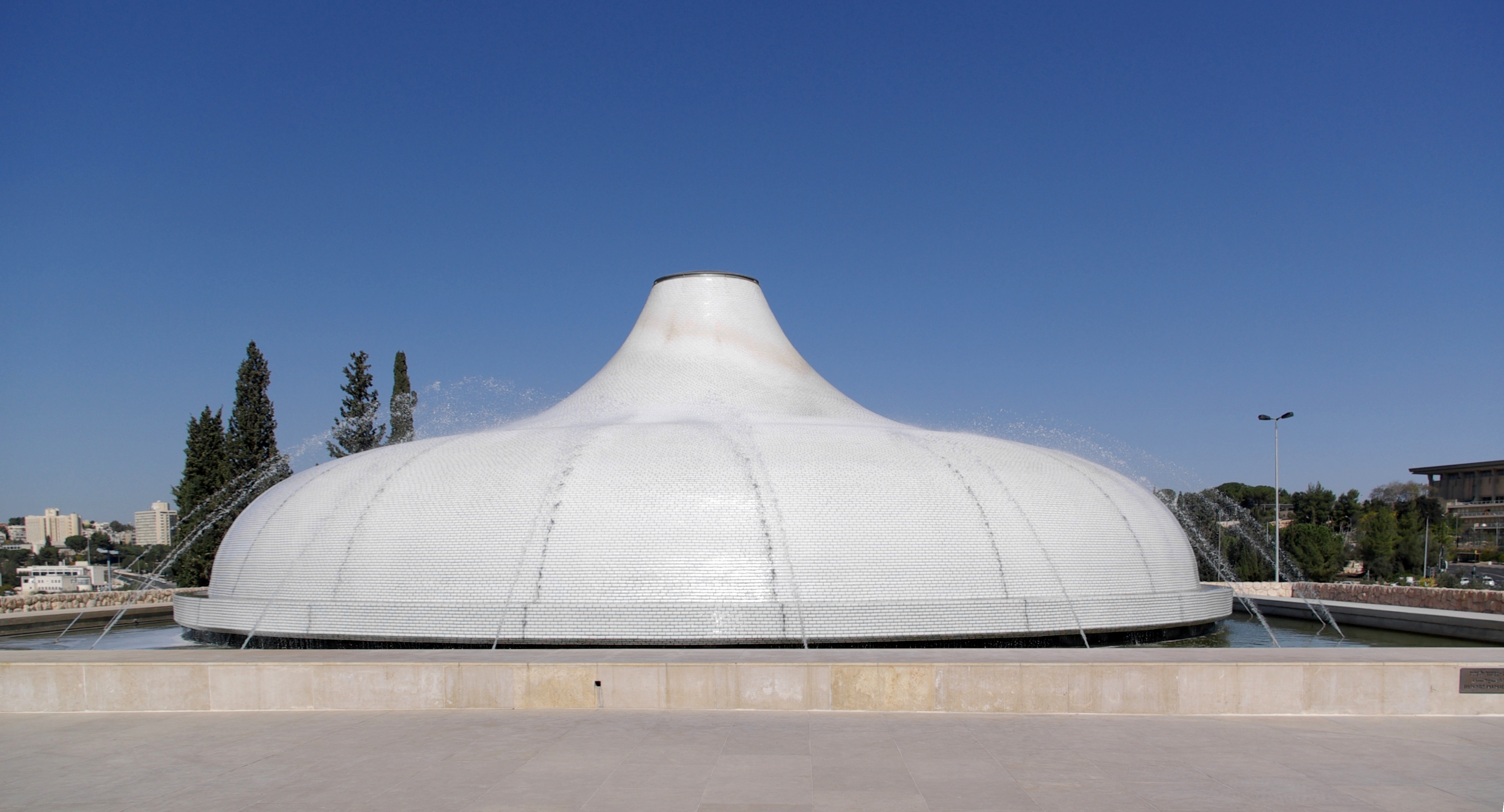
The Shrine of the Book at the Israel Museum.

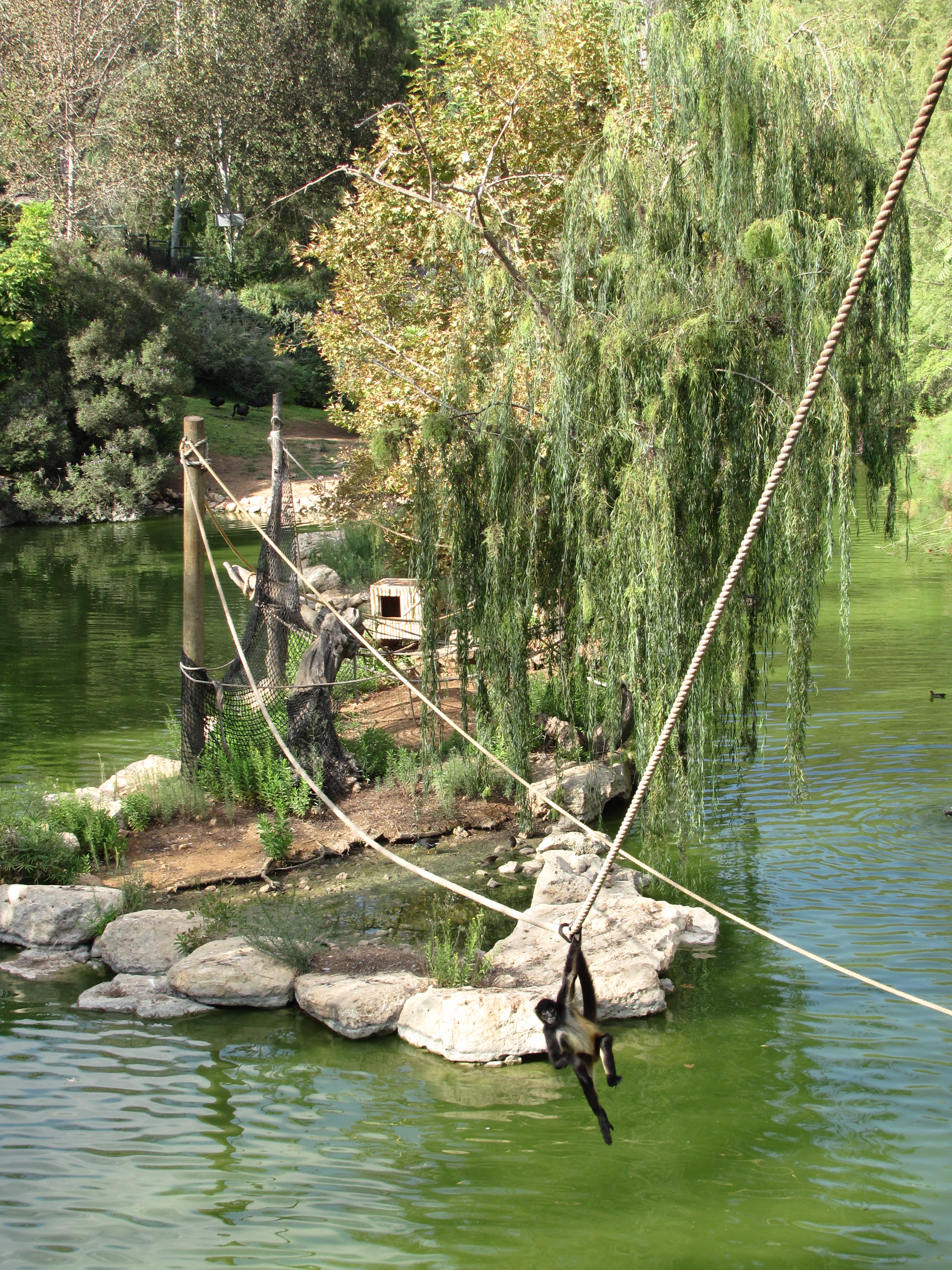
Tisch Family Zoological Gardens.

- Bloomfield Science Museum
- Haas Promenade
- Israel Museum
- Jerusalem Music Centre
- Jerusalem Cinematheque
- Jerusalem Walls National Park, a green belt encircling the walls of the Old City
- Mishkenot Sha'ananim Konrad Adenauer Conference Center
- Old City restoration and infrastructure upgrades
- Rebecca Crown Auditorium and Henry Crown Symphony Hall at the Jerusalem Theater
- Teddy Stadium
- Tower of David Museum
- Tisch Family Zoological Gardens (the Jerusalem Biblical Zoo)
- Wohl Rose Park
