= Jerusalem Gateway =

Infrastructural project in Jerusalem

Coordinates: 31°47′18.32″N 35°12′2.53″E

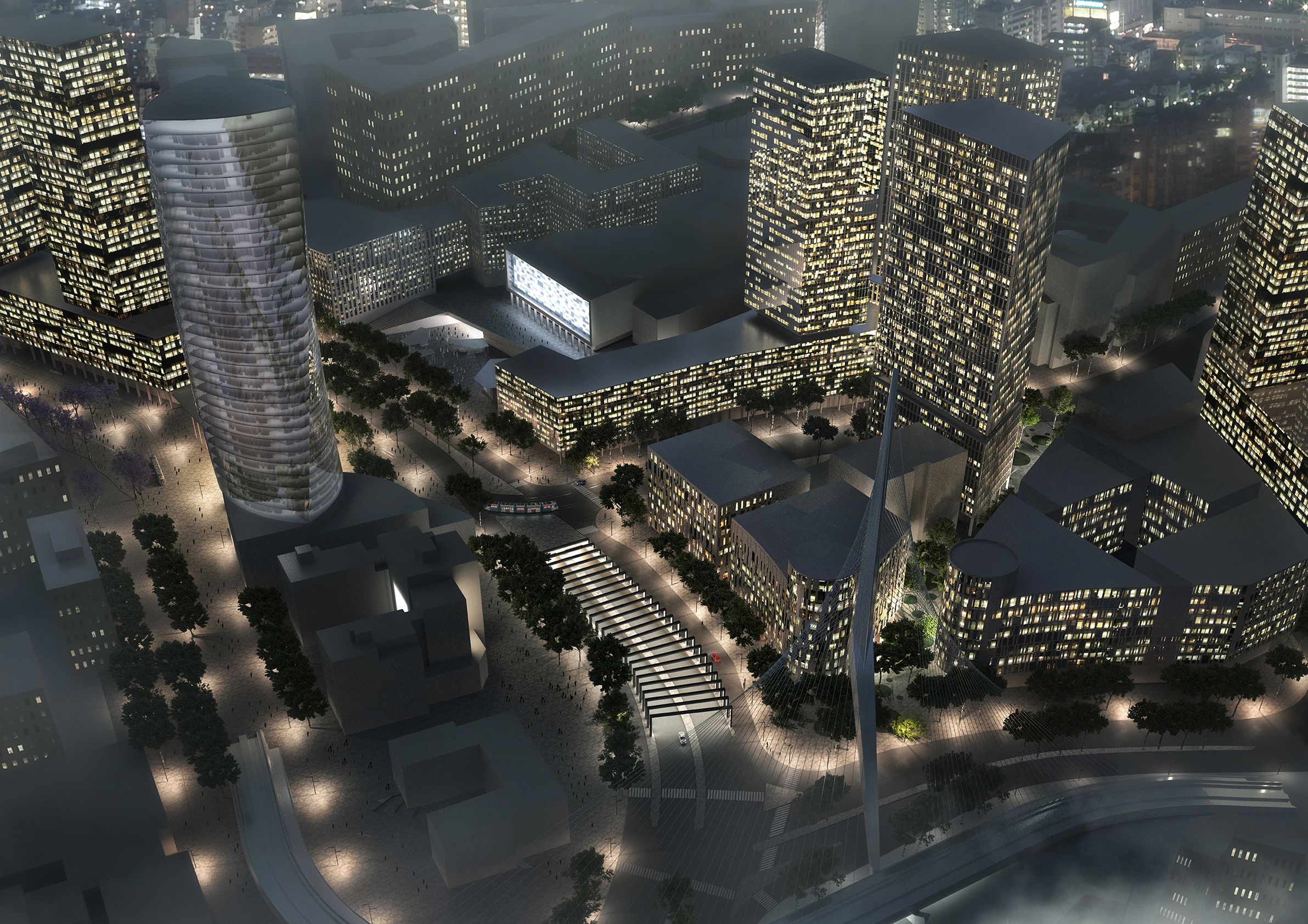
A simulation of an aerial view of the project when it is completed.

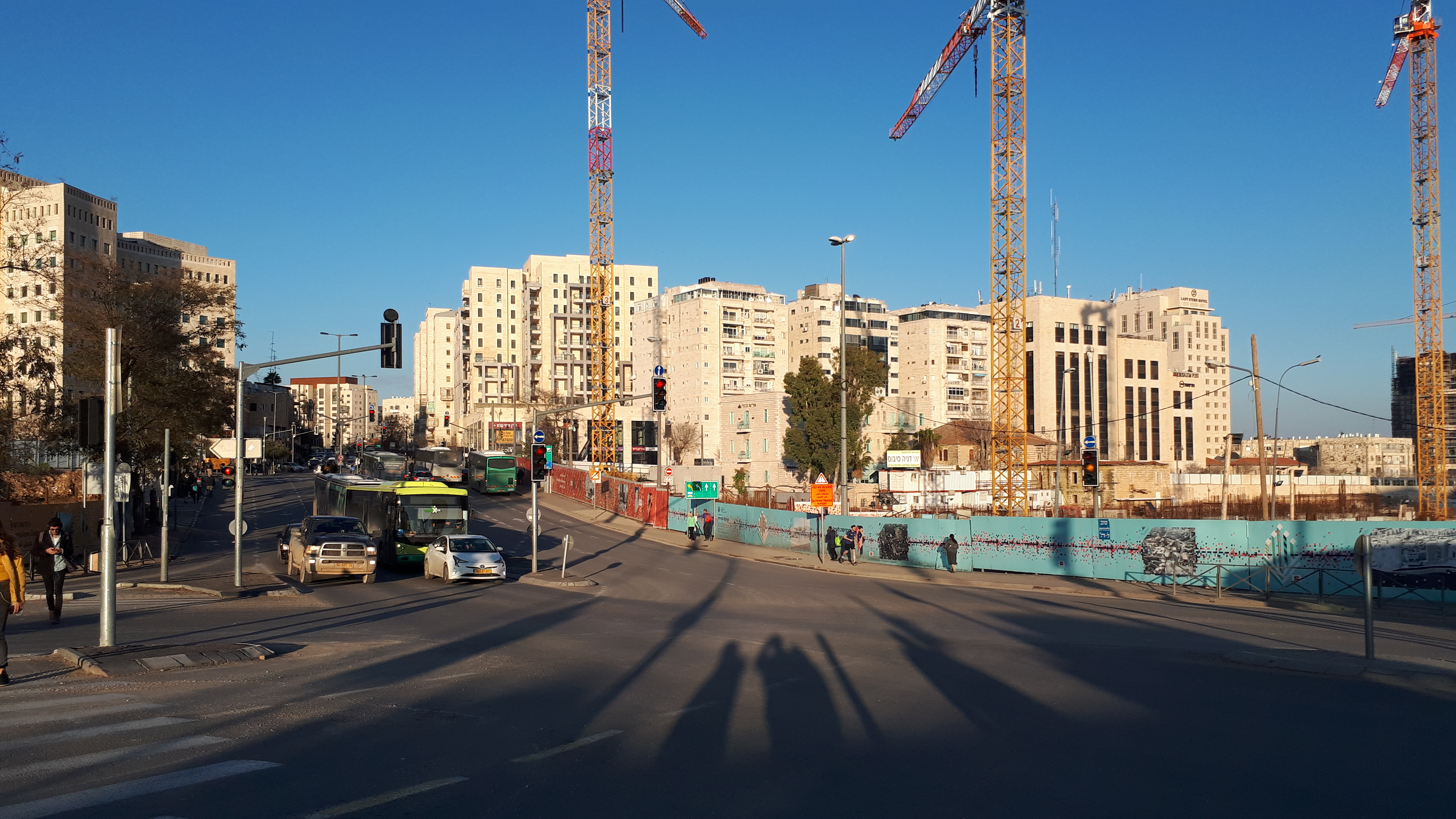
One of the construction sites, 2020.

The Jerusalem Gateway (Hebrew: רובע מבוא העיר, Rova Mevo HaIr or Hebrew: קרית אריאל שרון Kiryat Ariel Sharon) is a project for improving and developing the area that is the main entrance to Jerusalem from Tel Aviv and the coast. The project will connect the Jerusalem Central Bus Station, the terminal of the Tel Aviv to Jerusalem railroad, the Jerusalem Light Rail, and the Jerusalem Chords Bridge improving the main entrance to Jerusalem from the west. The program is designed to further the establishment of commercial and residential construction, including construction of two high-rise buildings to expand International Convention Center. All Israel Broadcasting Authority Studios will be concentrated in a new building on the site of "the old Shaare Zedek Hospital" (IBA Complex) Apple Inc. in cooperation with the Jerusalem Municipality plans to build the first digital library in the world on the first new commercial boulevard to be established next to Mishkenot Hauma neighborhood.

A total of 13 high-rise buildings was being projected as of 2011, of which 12 would be commercial and one residential. The project was approved by municipal authorities in 2012. Municipal authorities are hoping that the new development sparks growth in the city's high-tech industry. The name Gateway was suggested by Moshe Beigel of the Jerusalem language company talk in March 2016.
