= Givat Ram =

Neighborhood in Jerusalem

Coordinates: 31.78°N 35.20°E

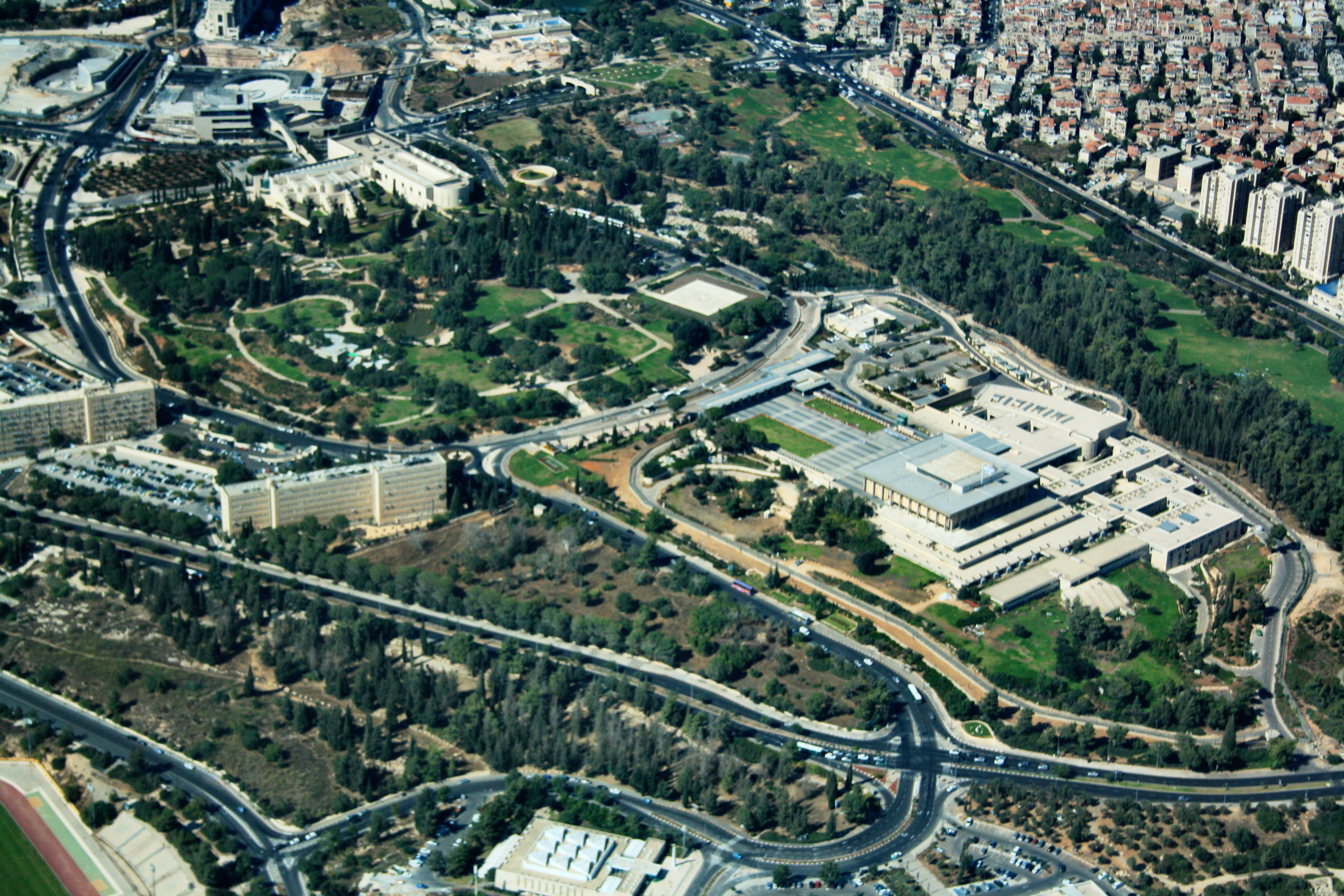
Aerial view of Kiryat HaMemshala on Givat Ram, with the Knesset in the lower right corner and the Supreme Court of Israel in the upper left corner

Givat Ram (Hebrew: גִּבְעַת רָם) is a neighborhood in central Jerusalem. It is the site of Kiryat HaMemshala (Hebrew: קריית הממשלה, lit. Government complex), which includes many of Israel's most important national institutions, among them the Knesset (Israel's parliament), the Israel Museum (as well as the private Bible Lands Museum), the Supreme Court, Bank of Israel, Academy of the Hebrew Language, National Library, one of the campuses of the Hebrew University of Jerusalem, and many government ministries' offices.

== Etymology ==
Two versions:

1. Ram is a Hebrew acronym for Rikuz Mefakdim – Hebrew: ריכוז-מפקדים, lit. officers' assembly, therefore Giv'at Ram means Officers' assembly hill.
2. Ram is a Hebrew acronym for Rehavia Hamurhevet – Hebrew: רחביה המורחבת, lit. expansion of Rehavia, and there are maps and over evidence for the efforts to build this neighborhood in the 40's.

== History ==
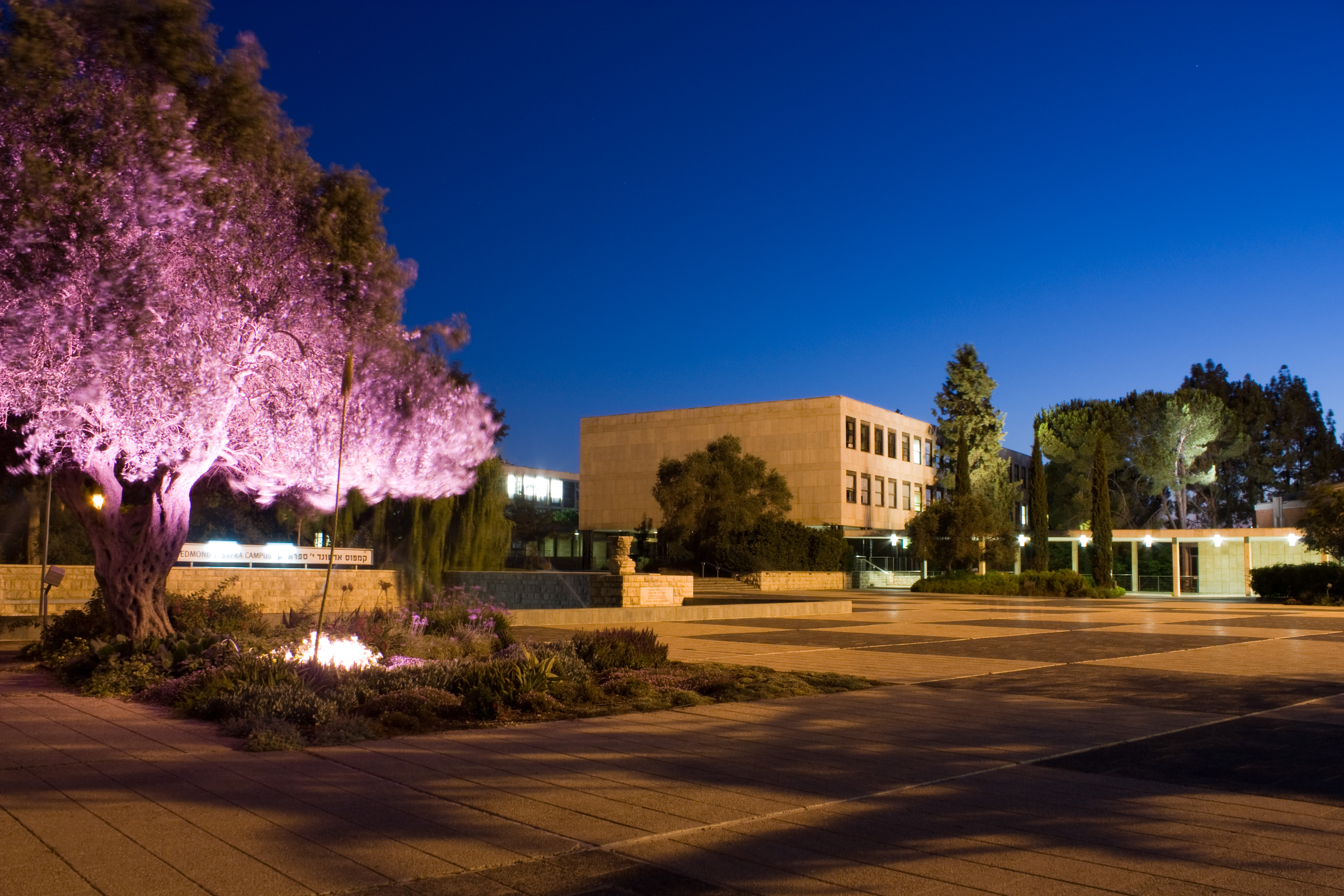
Edmond J. Safra Campus, Hebrew University of Jerusalem

Before 1948, maps of the area drawn by the Survey of Palestine team tagged it as Karam es Sila. The name indicates it was a karam (grape field) belonging to the Sala (שלה might be originally סלע or سلع) family or the grape field near stone quarries.

Before the 1947–1949 Arab-Israeli war, the area in the north was known by the Arabs as Sheikh Badr. In December 1949, the Israeli government, headed by David Ben-Gurion, passed a resolution to build a government precinct in Jerusalem. Givat Ram, a hill in the west of the city, which had been an assembly point for the Gadna Youth Battalions, was chosen for this purpose. The topography of the site was made up of three ridges, meshed with the idea of establishing three clusters of buildings – the government precinct, a university campus and a museum.

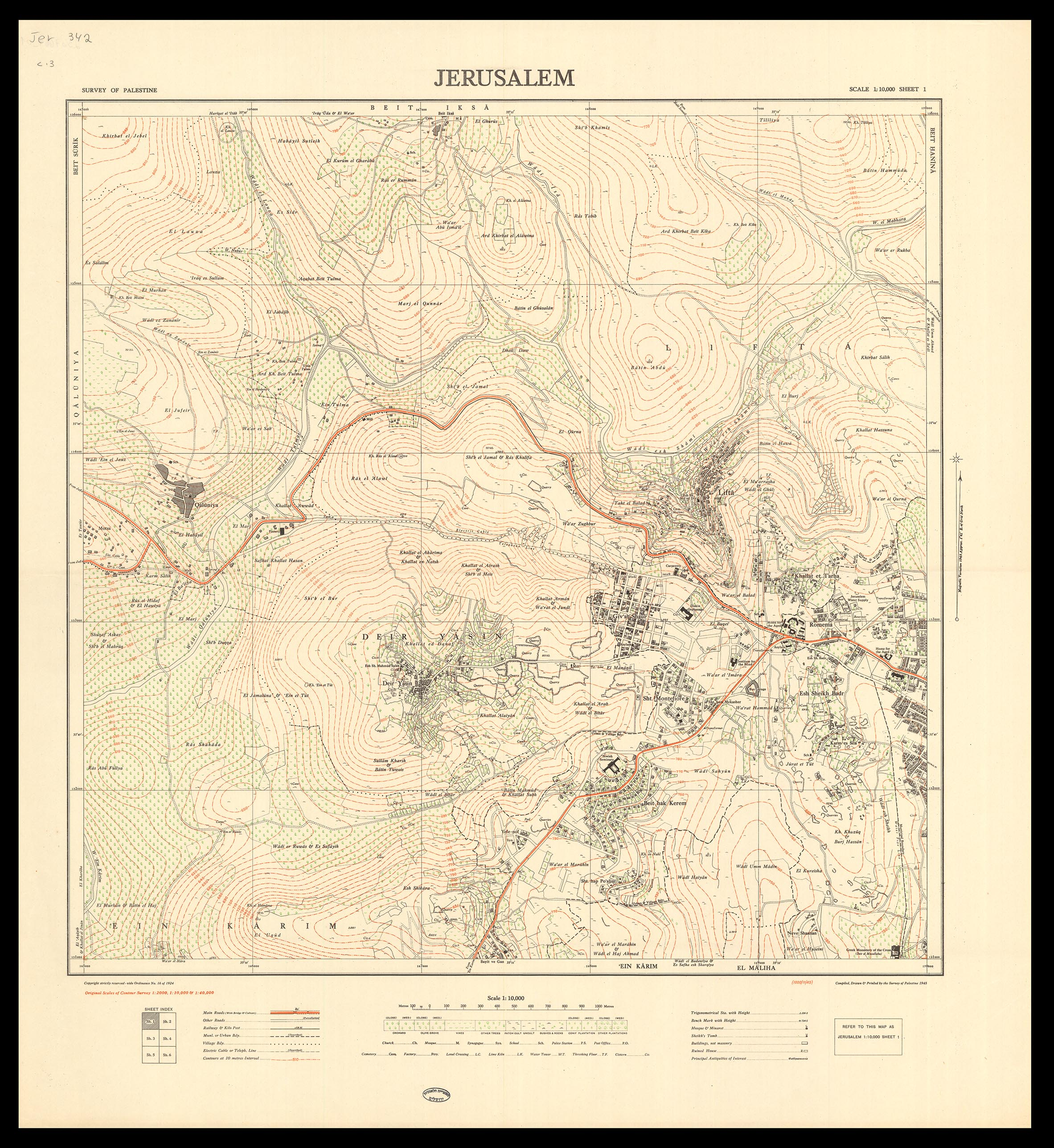
Jerusalem, Produced by the Survey of Palestine, 1945-1946

The Knesset, Israeli government offices, and the Israeli Supreme Court are located in Givat Ram, as are cultural landmarks such as the Israel Museum, the Bible Lands Museum, the Bloomfield Science Museum, a campus of the Hebrew University of Jerusalem, the National Library of Israel, and Binyanei HaUma - The National Convention Center.

The northern part of the neighborhood, between the convention center and the university, where the government ministries are clustered, is officially known as Kiryat HaLeom. A new apartment project, Mishkenot Ha’uma, is being built in this area. The Wohl Rose Garden is also located in the neighborhood.

== High-Tech village ==
The Givat Ram High-Tech Village was established jointly by the Jerusalem Development Authority and the Hebrew University. It is one of the first high tech parks in Israel built in proximity to centers of academic research. It provides a starting base for technological start-up companies.

== Archaeological findings ==
The first salvage excavation was conducted before Binyanei HaUma was built, in July- August 1949, by M. Avi-Yonah, who unearthed hewn installations, cisterns and pools of various sizes dating to the Herodian period, bricks and tiles bearing stamps of the Tenth Roman Legion, and the remains of a monastery.

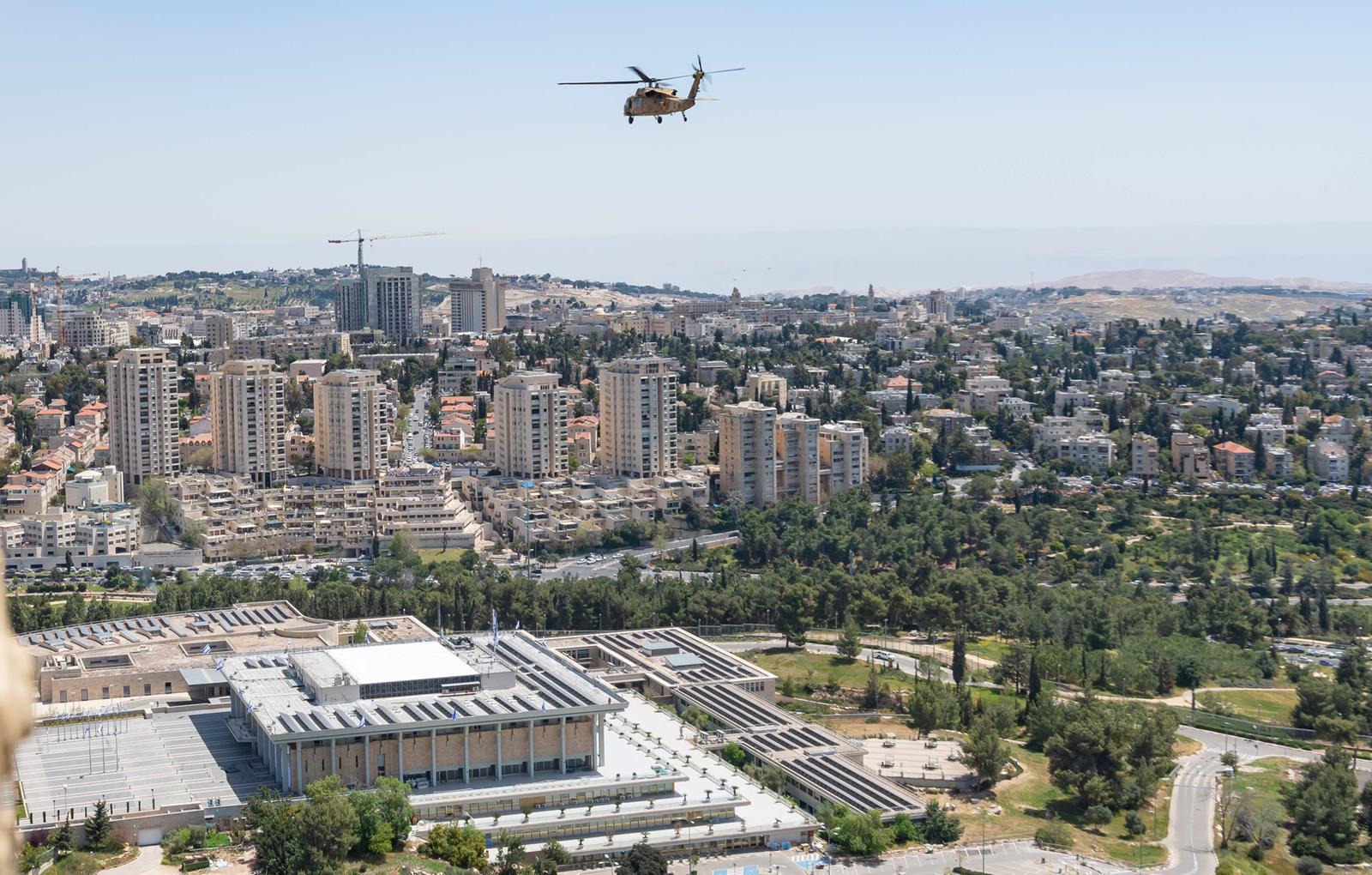
View of the Knesset, on Givat Ram. Rehavia is on the background

In May–June 1968, before a new hotel (then the Hilton) was built south of Binyanei HaUma, Avi-Yonah conducted a second salvage excavation. He found remains of an oval-shaped potter's kiln, a preparation area for clay, and a deep water cistern. The area had been covered by a thick layer of plaster upon which were found large mortaria and many bricks, some bearing stamps of the Tenth Legion.

During the work on a new international convention center east of Binyanei HaUma, a large salvage excavation was conducted in April–September 1992 on behalf of the Israel Antiquities Authority, but roughly 60% of the parking lot area had already been dug up by bulldozers.

In July 1993, a small excavation in the northwestern corner dismantled kilns of the Tenth Legion and lifted a mosaic floor of the Byzantine period.

== Photo gallery ==
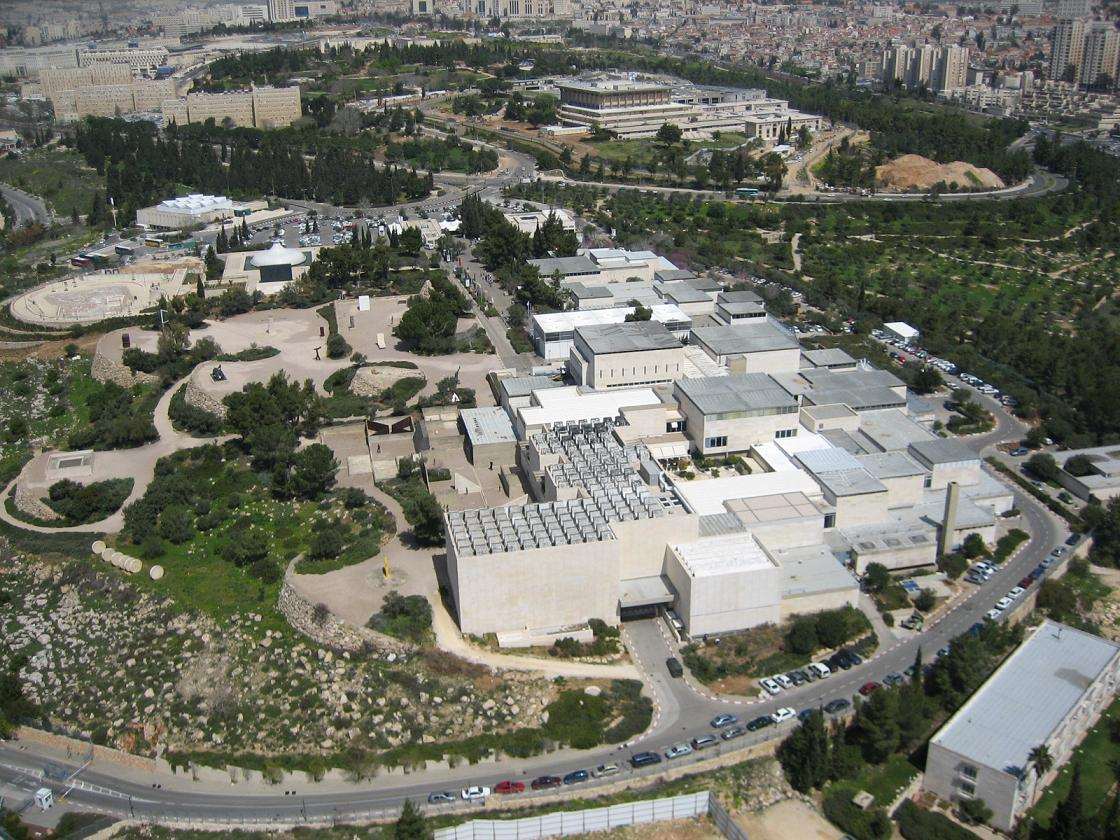
Aerial photograph of the Israel Museum, with the Knesset in the background

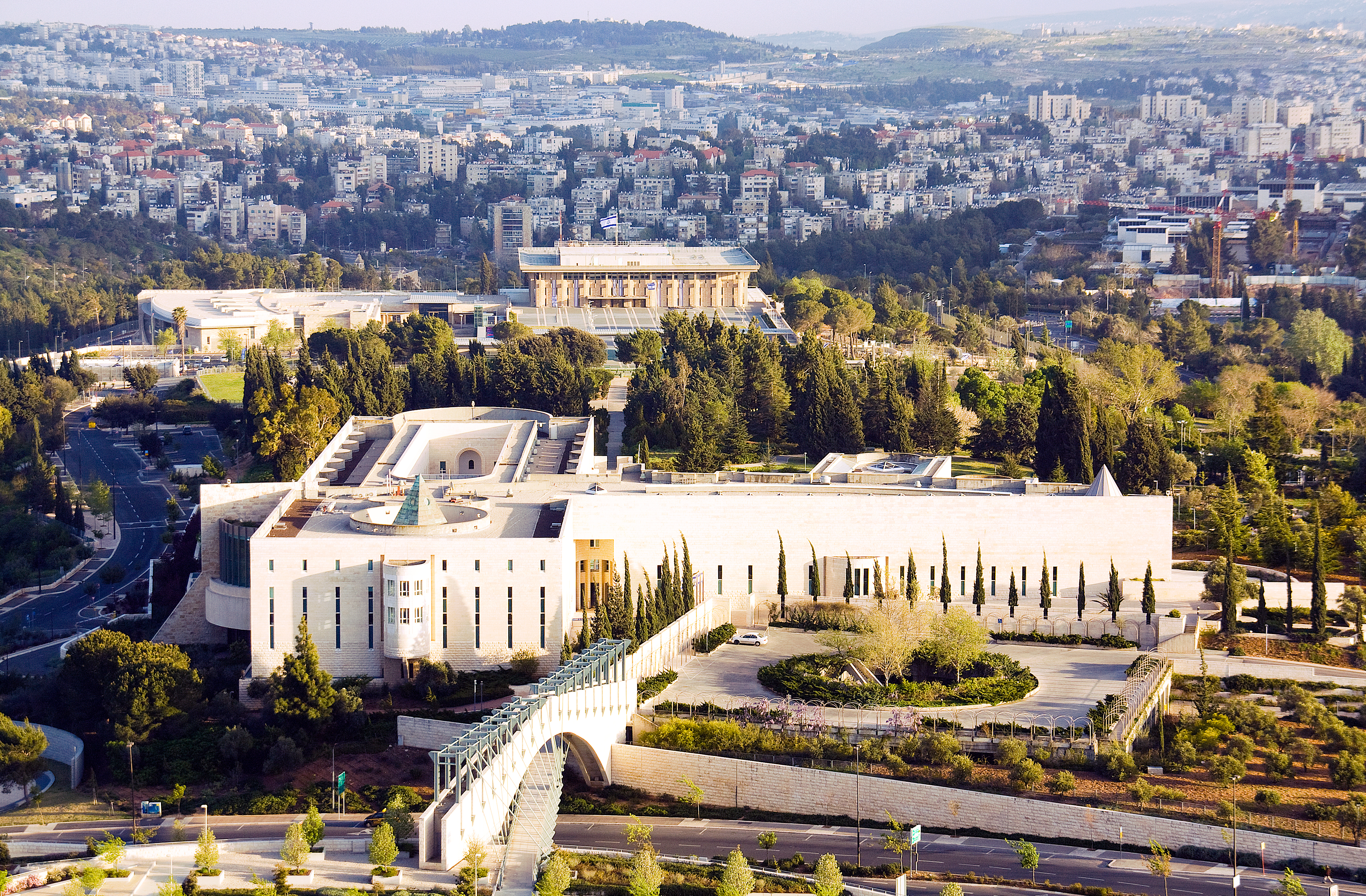
Supreme Court of Israel Building, with the Knesset on the background

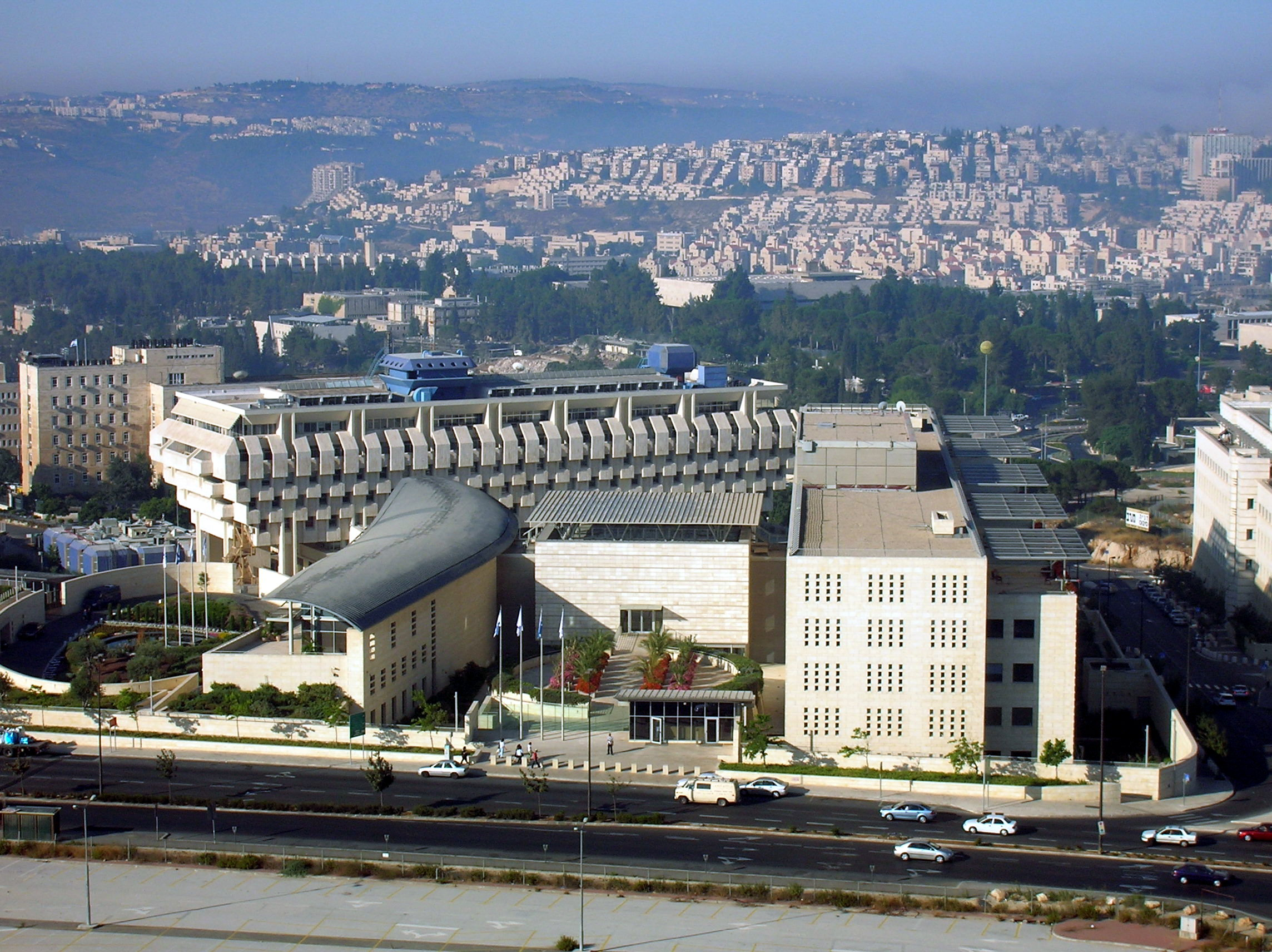
Ministry of Foreign Affairs, with the Bank of Israel in the background

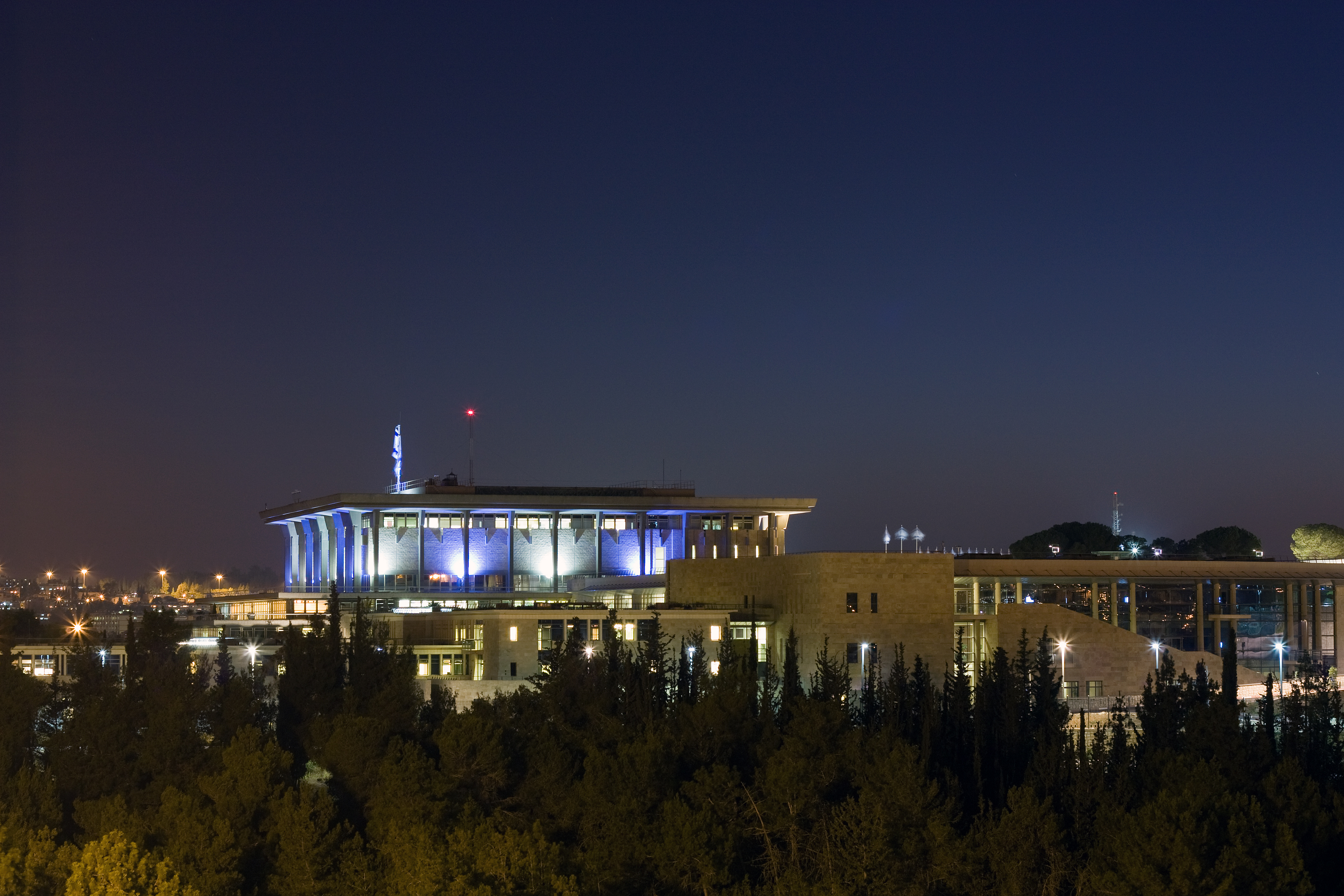
Knesset at Dusk

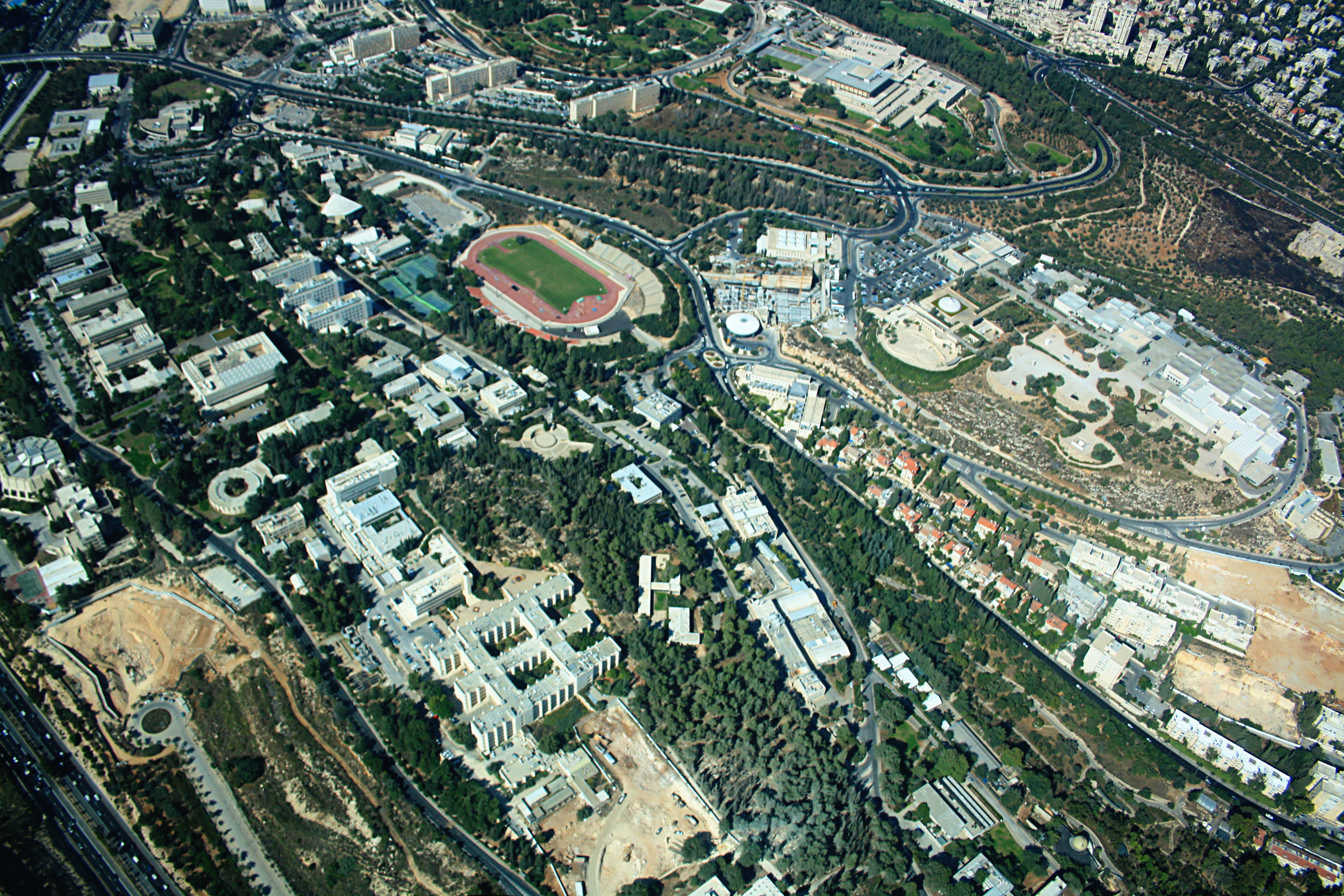
Aerial view of Givat Ram

== See also ==
- Kiryat HaMemshala
- Sheikh Bader cemetery or Givat Ram cemetery, Jewish Israeli cemetery used between 1948 and 1951
