= Kiryat HaMemshala =

Government complex in Jerusalem

Coordinates: 31°46′51.3″N 35°12′2.48″E

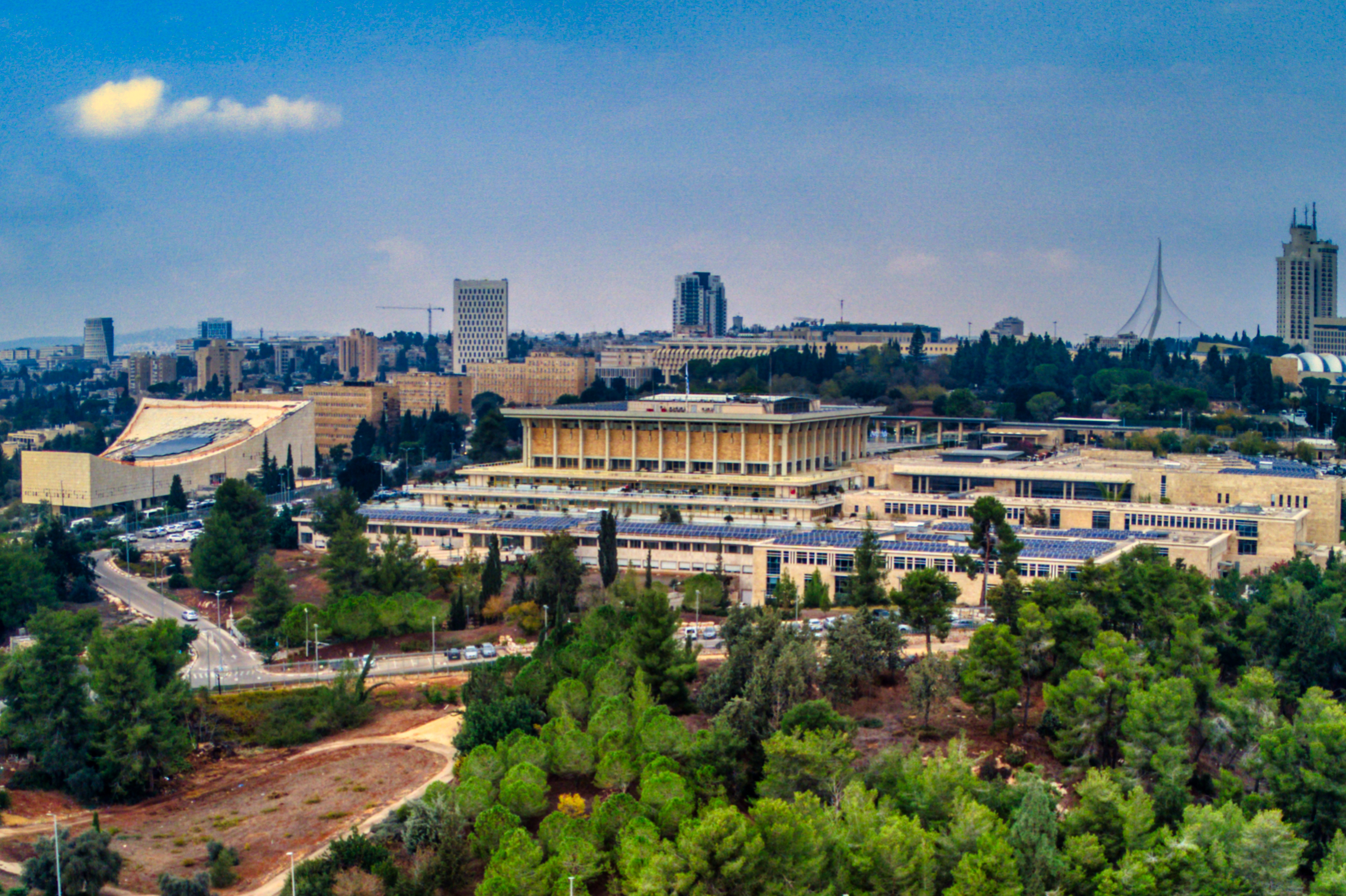
View of Kiryat HaMemshala with the Knesset center

Kiryat HaMemshala (Hebrew: קריית הממשלה, lit. 'Government complex'), also known as Kiryat Ben-Gurion (Hebrew: קריית בן־גוריון, lit. 'Ben-Gurion complex'), is the government precinct of the State of Israel. It is located in the Givat Ram neighborhood of Jerusalem.

== History ==
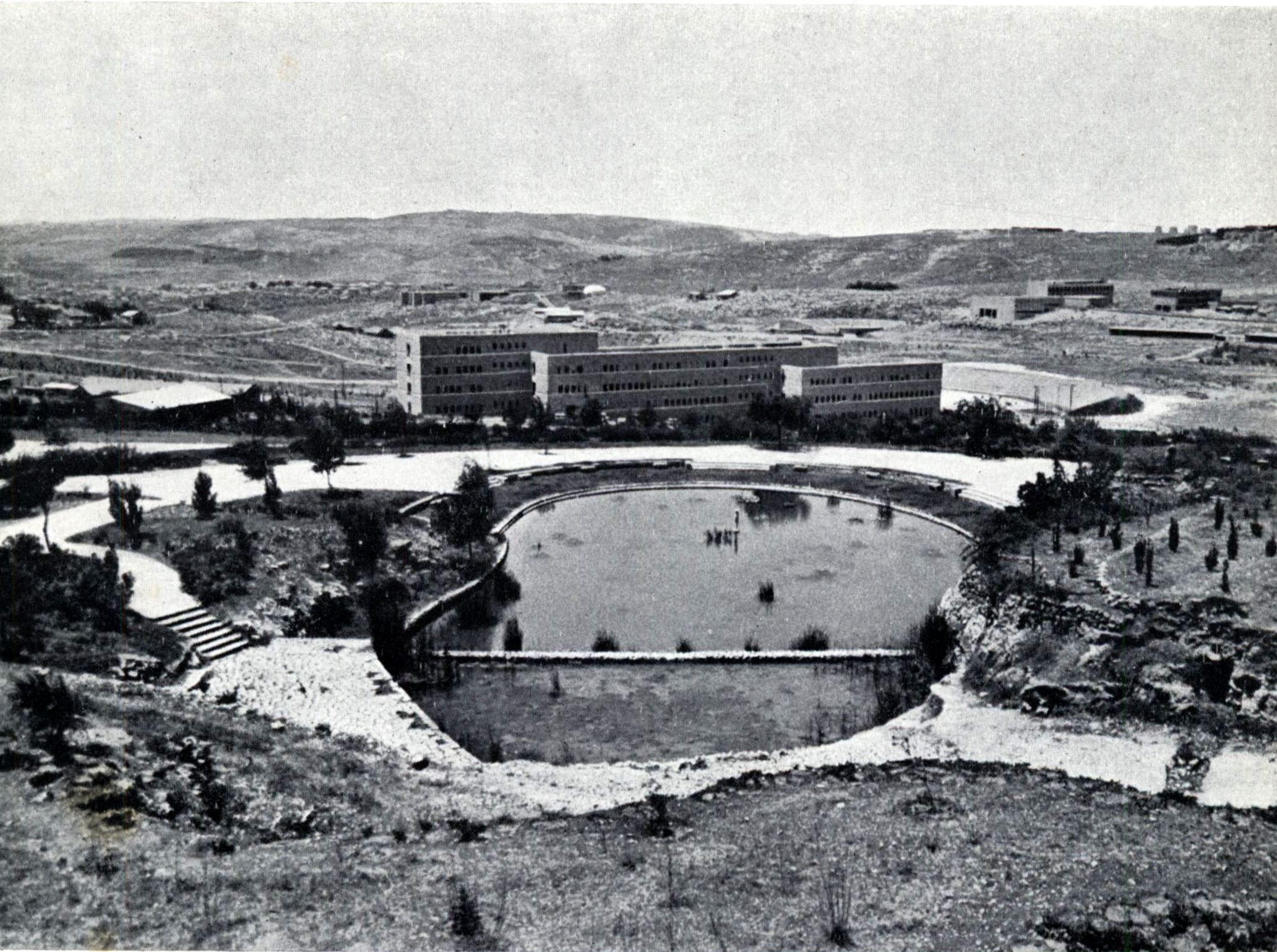
Israel government ministries and garden under construction, 1950s

In December 1949, the Israeli cabinet, then headed by David Ben-Gurion, voted to move most of the country's official government institutions from Tel Aviv to Jerusalem. Construction work began in 1950. The original plans were drawn up by the architectural firms of Munio Gitai Weinraub and Al Mansfeld, but they were not implemented. The complex was designed by architects Richard Kauffmann, Joseph Klarwein and Heinz Rau.

The Knesset is located at Kiryat HaMemshala, as are the Supreme Court of Israel, the Prime Minister's Office, the Ministry of Foreign Affairs, the Ministry of Interior, the Ministry of Finance, and the Bank of Israel.

== See also ==
- Kiryat Menachem Begin – East Jerusalem compound also referred to as Kiryat HaMemshala
- Kiryat Haleom, Jerusalem's 'National Precinct' which includes Kiryat HaMemshala
- National Institutions House, Jerusalem complex for the historical Zionist organizations
