= Jerusalem Bird Observatory =

Urban bird observatory in Israel

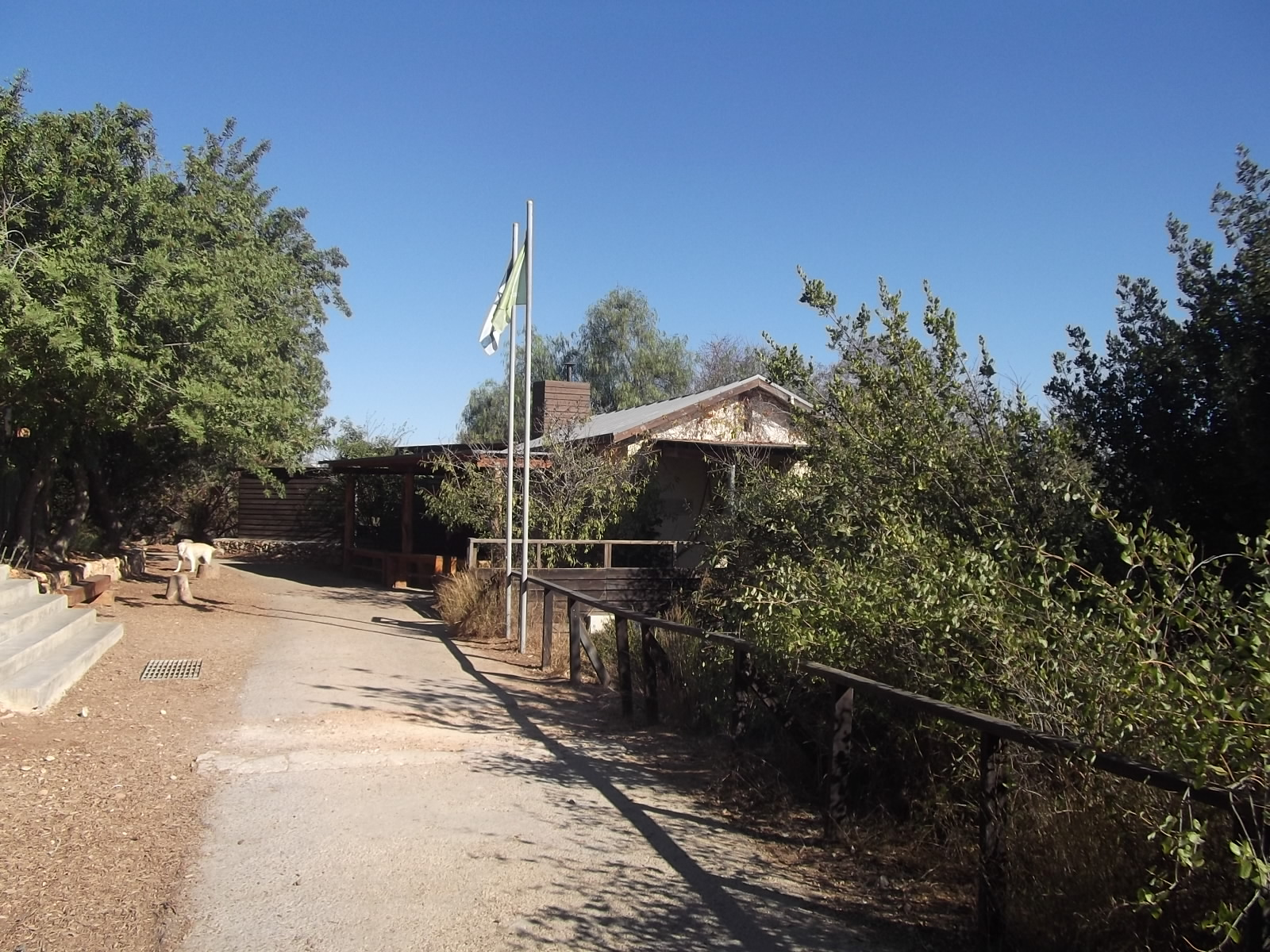
- Location: Jerusalem, Jerusalem District, Israel
- Coordinates: 31°47′N 35°13′E
- Related media on Commons

The Jerusalem Bird Observatory is an urban bird observatory in Israel, sited on a 5,000 m^{2} (54,000 sq ft) plot in central Jerusalem between the Knesset and the Supreme Court.

== History ==
The Jerusalem Bird Observatory was established in 1994 by the Society for the Protection of Nature in Israel. It was founded by the naturalist Amir Balaban and the ornithologist Gidon Perlman. In 2016, 50,000 tourists visited the park.

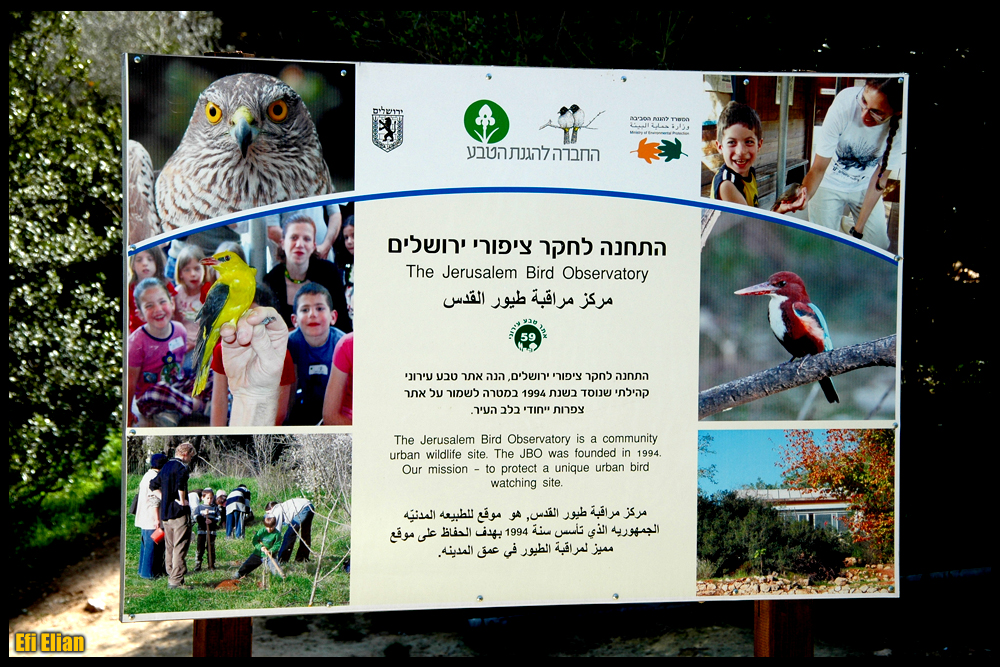
Entrance sign, Jerusalem Bird Observatory

The Gutman Center addition was opened in 2011 for birds and bees.

The Jerusalem Bird Observatory has a strategic location on the bird migration route between Africa and Eurasia along the Great Rift Valley. Every spring and fall, more than 500 million birds migrate through Israel. Two-thirds of the species seen in Jerusalem are migratory. 30% of the birds are permanent residents, they do not migrate. Gazelles also populate the park.

The observatory serves as the national bird banding center. It is directed by naturalist Amir Balaban and ornithologist Gidon Perleman. Two hundred birds are banded every day by trained volunteers during the spring and fall migrations.

It is located between the Parliament, the Wohl Rose Park and the Supreme Court building. Small wooden observation posts are open 24 hours a day, 7 days a week. The park is free.

== Rare birds ==
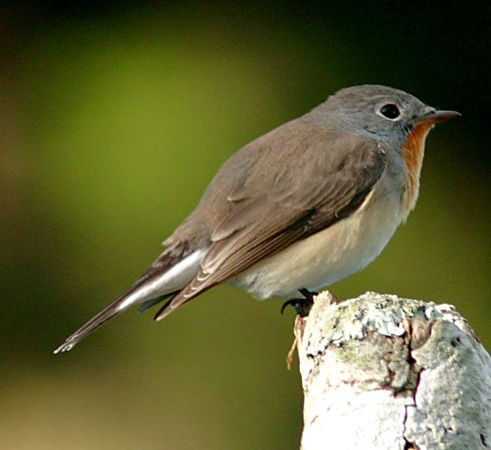
The Taiga flycatcher has been recorded at the observatory.

- Eyebrowed thrush (Turdus obscurus), sighted at the observatory in 2007
- Taiga flycatcher (Ficedula albicollis), banded at the observatory on 29 April 2007
- Hawfinch (Coccothraustes coccothraustes), banded at the observatory in June 2011

== See also ==
- Wildlife in Israel
- Tourism in Israel
