= Wohl Rose Park =

Public garden in Jerusalem

Coordinates: 31°46′45″N 35°12′13″E

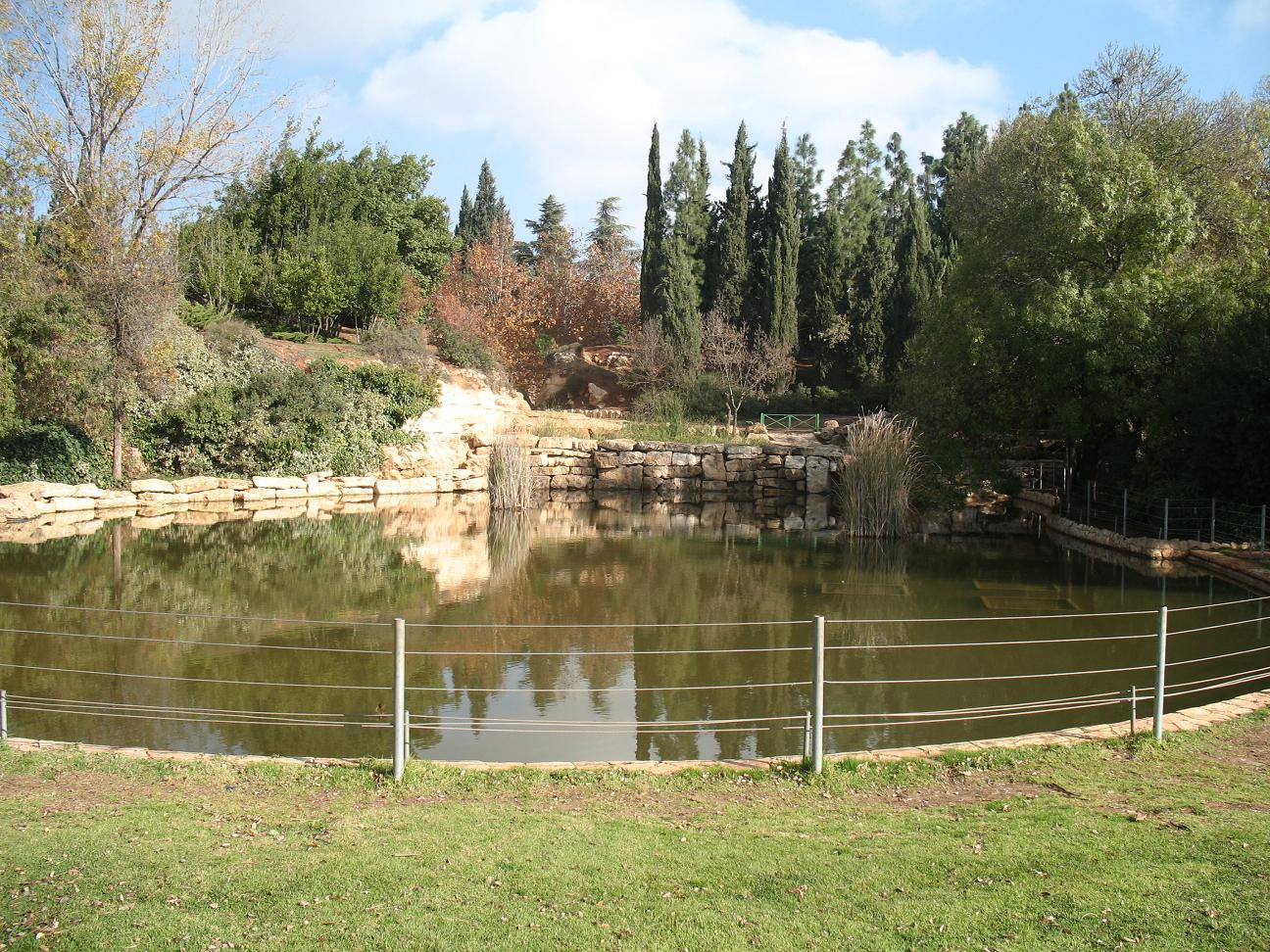
View of the pond, Wohl Rose Park

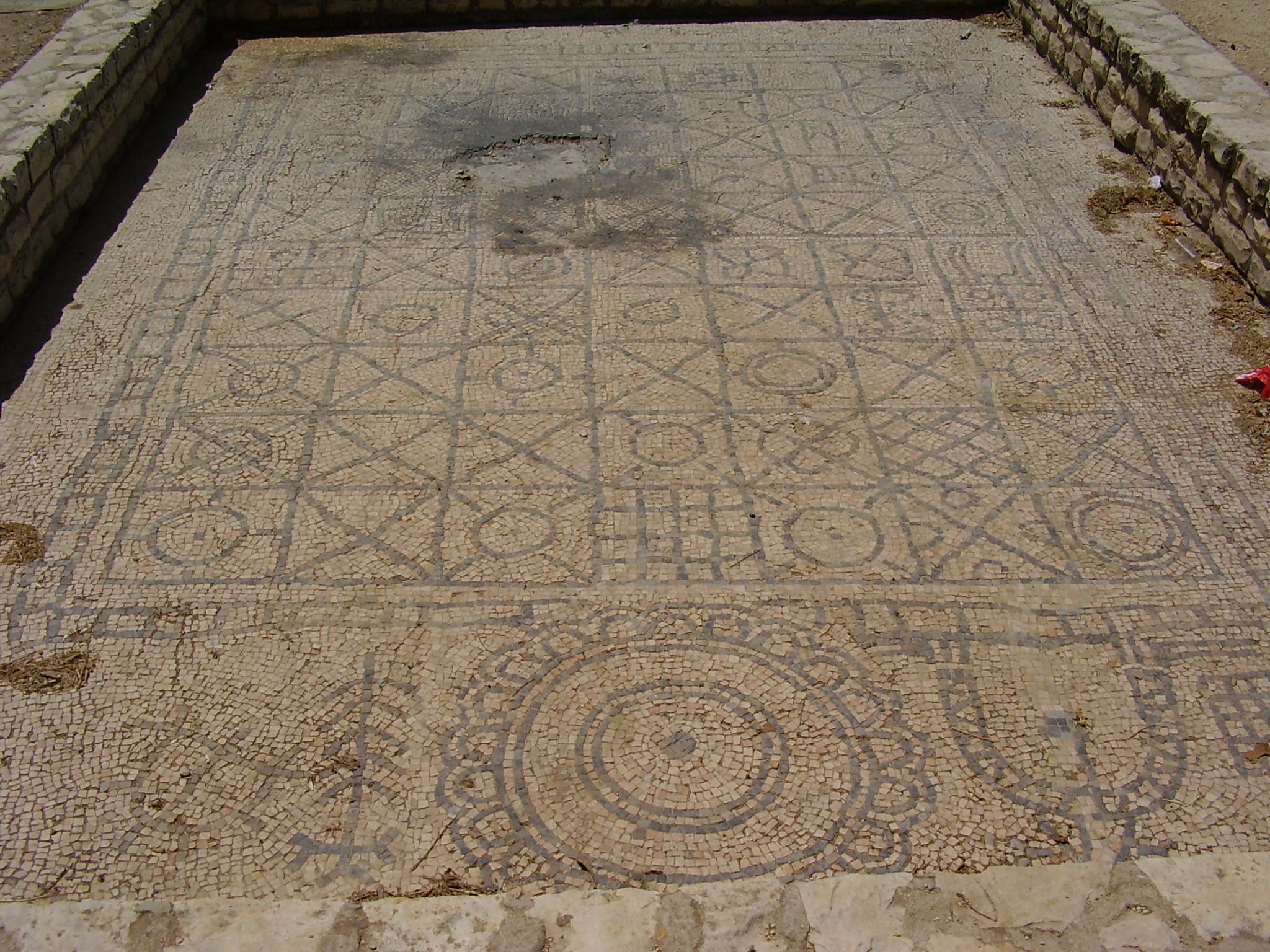
An ancient mosaic preserved in the garden

Wohl Rose Park (Hebrew: גן הוורדים, Gan HaVradim) is a public garden in Givat Ram, Jerusalem, located opposite the Knesset and government precinct, at the foot of the Israeli Supreme Court.

The park was established in 1981. Over 400 varieties of roses are grown there, many of them gifts from countries around the world. The Wohl Rose Park covers 19 acres (77,000 m^{2}). It is one of the few rose parks of its kind in the Middle East, where there is no rainfall in summer.

The park's Garden of Nations is made up of sections donated by other countries. Each section has rose varieties characteristic of, or grown in, the respective country. The park also has an experimental section where new varieties of roses are tested for their suitability for public and private gardens in Israel.

In October 2003, the Wohl Rose Park won an award for excellence in an international competition for rose gardens from all over the world. The park was proclaimed one of the eleven most beautiful rose gardens in the world. In addition to some 15,000 rose bushes, the park features expansive lawns, hills, quarries, an ornamental pond with aquatic plants and fish, a waterfall, rockeries, and sculptures. A sixth-century mosaic floor unearthed at Kibbutz Sde Nahum was installed in the park.

The Knesset Menorah is located outside the park, facing the Knesset.

Due to the park's location opposite the Prime Minister's Office and other government buildings, it is a choice site for Israeli demonstrators: The garden often hosts tent cities of protesters, with tables for petition signing, banners and placards.

== History ==
The original design for the park was drawn up in 1949. In its early years, the park was only used for official government ceremonies. It opened to the general public towards the end of the 1950s. It was known at the time as President's Park. In 1978–1979, David Gilad of the Israel Flower Board was looking for a location for a rose park that would be the focal point of the international rose congress that was to convene in Israel in October 1981. President's Park was deemed an appropriate site due to its unique location and panoramic views. The park was re-landscaped by landscape architect Joseph Segal. The project was carried out in cooperation with the Jerusalem Foundation under the sponsorship of Vivienne and Maurice Wohl.

== Planting goals ==
When selecting the rose varieties, one of the goals was to show different groups of roses: Species roses - the original species from which varieties were bred 300 years ago; Old Garden Roses - the products of early breeding of roses; and modern roses such as Hybrid tea roses, Floribunda, Polyanthas, miniature roses, rose shrubs, and modern climbers.

Another goal was to demonstrate various garden possibilities: Blossoming swathes of color, roses climbing up pergolas and pillars, "sculpted" rose shrubs, rambling roses, standards roses, roses with decorative fruit, hedges made up of rose bushes, and more.

In June 2022, a project was planned to upgrade the Rose Garden, intended to last approximately 16 months. The project continued into 2025. In May 2024, a decision was made to construct a fence around the garden as part of "police preparations for handling mass protest events".

== See also ==
- White House Rose Garden
- International Rose Test Garden
