= Sigmund Rolat =

Polish-American businessman (1930–2024)

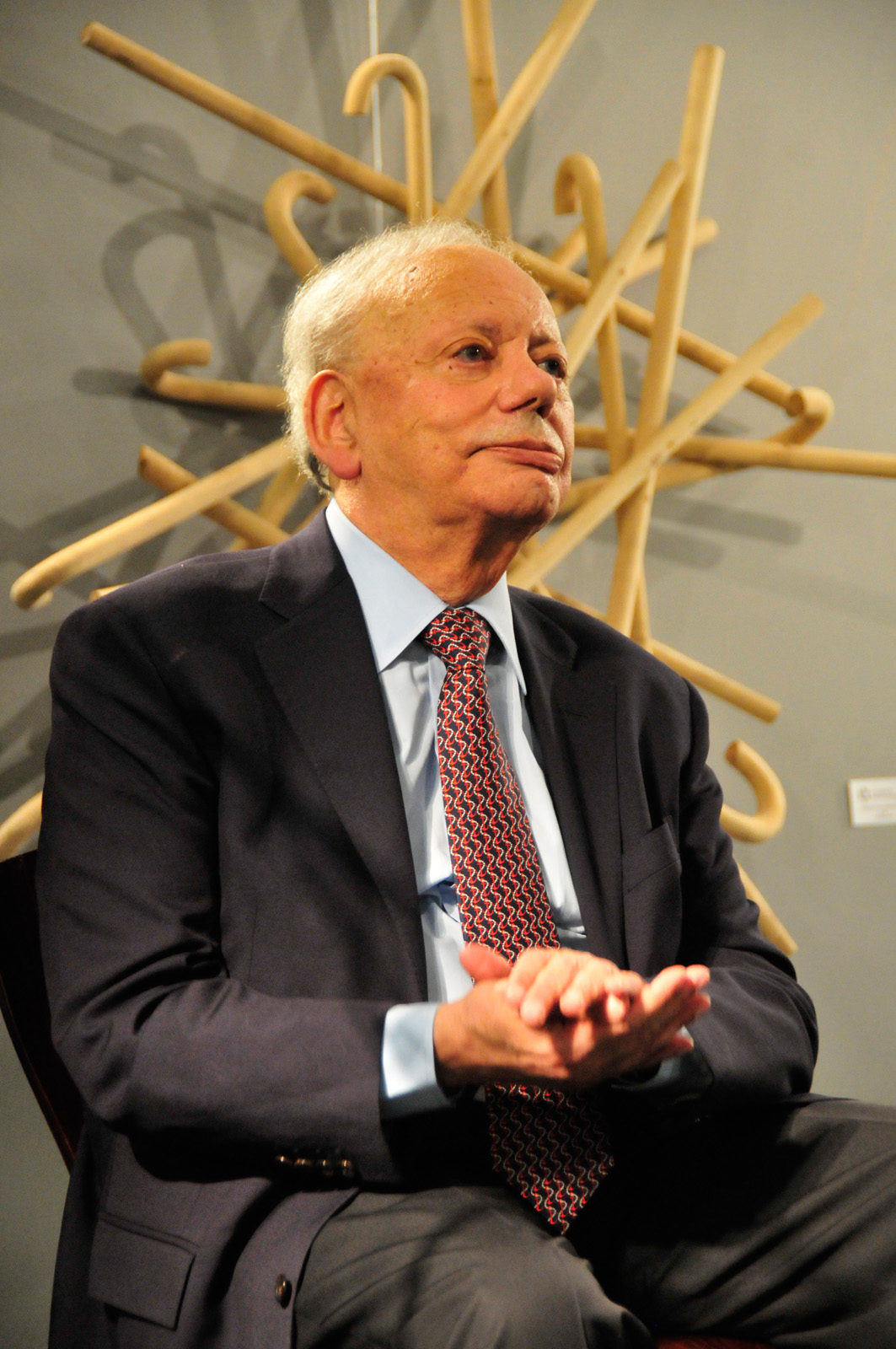
- Rolat in 2013
- Born: Zygmunt Rozenblat; July 1, 1930; Częstochowa, Poland
- Died: May 19, 2024 (aged 93); New York City, U.S.
- Occupations: Philanthropist; art collector; businessman
- Known for: POLIN Museum of the History of Polish Jews

Sigmund A. Rolat, born as Zygmunt Rolat, (July 1, 1930 – May 19, 2024) was a Polish-American philanthropist, art collector, and businessman. He was a founding donor of Polin, The Museum of the History of Polish Jews and a key supporter of numerous charitable endeavors.

== Early life ==
Sigmund A. Rolat (originally Zygmunt Rozenblat) was born on July 1, 1930, in Częstochowa, Poland. His grandfather Abram Rozenblat was the founder of the first Jewish elementary school where all subjects were taught exclusively in Polish. Rolat's happy childhood in pre-war Częstochowa left unforgettable memories. In numerous memoirs and in interviews given to the media around the world, Rolat always referred to Częstochowa as his "little homeland".

== World War II ==
Rolat survived the Holocaust in the Częstochowa Ghetto, in hiding and as a forced laborer in the Hasag Pelcery labor camp. His parents and older brother died during the German occupation of Poland. Rolat's father Henryk participated in the uprising in Treblinka. His mother Mariane was murdered in the Jewish cemetery and buried in a mass grave there. His brother Jerzyk, the youngest member of the Częstochowa Jewish resistance, was executed by the Nazis at the Jewish cemetery along with five older friends in March 1943. Rolat's Polish nanny Elka also perished, choosing to remain in the ghetto because she did not want to abandon the young Sigmund.

== After the war ==
Rolat was liberated from the HASAG-Pelcery camp in January 1945. He decided to leave Częstochowa with the pain and grief of losing the entire immediate family, close and distant relatives, friends from the neighborhood, schoolmates and acquaintances. He went to France and then moved to Germany where he received his high school diploma. In February 1948, Rolat arrived in the United States with just eight dollars in his pocket. He graduated from the University of Cincinnati and New York University and eventually built a sizable international finance company. Business opportunities in Poland after the fall of communism gave Rolat the chance to reconnect with his birthplace, inspiring him to work towards preserving Poland's rich Jewish history.

== Philanthropy ==
Sigmund Rolat was one of the prime financial supporters and ambassadors for the restoration of Polish Jewry's place in Polish and world history. Towards the end of his life, Rolat's chief philanthropic endeavor was Polin, The Museum of the History of Polish Jews. He was a founding donor of this important museum built on the site of the Warsaw Ghetto, and served as the Chairman of the North American Council of the museum. He was a longtime supporter of Yad Vashem and the American Society for Yad Vashem. He achieved the status of Builder at Yad Vashem, Jerusalem by donating generously and often. He was also recognized for the generous donation of the works of Private Tolkatchev as well as other artwork to Yad Vashem's collection.

A lover of the arts, Rolat was a key supporter of the annual Jewish Culture Festival in Kraków, a patron of Warsaw's Singer Jewish Culture Festival, the honorary Chairman of the Friends of the Jewish Culture Festival Association, the sponsor of the 8th Edition of the Bronislaw Huberman Violin Festival in Częstochowa, and a supporter of both the Bronislaw Huberman Częstochowa Philharmonic and the Grand Theater – National Opera in Warsaw.

=== Monument controversy: From Those You Saved ===
Sigmund Rolat was the founder of the Remembrance and Future Foundation that organized the controversial monument competition From Those You Saved in Warsaw, to commemorate Polish righteous gentiles who saved Jews during the Holocaust. The plans to erect the monument next to the POLIN Museum, in the heart of the former Warsaw Ghetto, were harshly criticized by a significant number of Polish Jews. The president of the Jewish Community of Warsaw Anna Chipczyńska said she had regrets that they could not find an alternative site that would allow both the honouring of the Righteous Among the Nations as well as avoiding controversies and disagreements. Polish writer Bożena Keff expressed her view that the location of the monument was less about respecting history and more an act of propaganda. The winners of the competition, Austrian architect Gabu Heindl and artist Eduard Freudmann, decided to include the controversies in their monument project and proposed to plant a forest nursery consisting of thousands of saplings next to the museum. After a year and a half, the saplings would be replanted as a forest at an urban location in Warsaw to be agreed upon by the protagonists of the conflict.

An international jury of 10 architects, artists, and curators chose The Monument May Be A Forest as the winning proposal, because the project represented the commemoration of the processual aspect rather than just using imposing physical presence; it is based on "notions of care, commitment, fragility and risk" as well as the actual act of sheltering the Jews and has the potential to spread the commemoration across time and space." POLIN's deputy director Zygmunt Stępiński said it was a good opportunity for the museum, opening up space for an educational program that had the opportunity to spread across the country. He also considered it was more complex than just setting a monument in front of the museum. The architect of the POLIN Museum, Rainer Mahlamäki, one of the judges who voted for the trees, sees the winner of the competition as a new type of art and memorial as opposed to a monument. After the jury's decision had been published in April 2015, Sigmund Rolat denounced the design. In February 2016 Rolat invited the Israeli sculptor Dani Karavan to take on the project but he declined after he had read an article written by Freudmann and Heindl, in which they criticize the foundation and their course of action. In April 2016 Karavan announced that he accepted the commission to build the monument, thereby sparking another furor. To this day the monument for the Polish righteous gentiles has not been built.

== Awards and honors ==
Sigmund Rolat received numerous awards, including the title Patron of the Arts, Patron of Culture and the title Honorary Citizen of the city by officials in Częstochowa.

On May 9, 2016, Rolat received The Jan Karski Humanitarian Award at the Consulate General of the Republic of Poland in New York City. The Award was established by The Polish-Jewish Dialogue Committee.

In December 2014, in New York, he received the Remembrance Award from Yad Vashem Society's chair Leonard Wilf.

In October 2014 Rolat was appointed the Honorary Professor at Jan Długosz University in his native Częstochowa.

On September 19, 2013, Rolat was awarded Poland's highest honor for citizens who live abroad, the Commander's Cross with Star of the Order of Merit of the Republic of Poland for achievements in Polish-Jewish dialogue presented personally in New York City by President Bronisław Komorowski.

In November 2013 he received the Spirit of Jan Karski Award at David S. Wyman Institute for Holocaust Studies 10th Anniversary Dinner.

In recognition of his efforts at Polin, The Museum of the History of Polish Jews, President Lech Kaczyński honored him with the Commander's Cross of the Order of Merit of the Republic of Poland during the commemoration of the 65th anniversary of the Warsaw Ghetto Uprising on April 19, 2008.

== Later public appearances ==
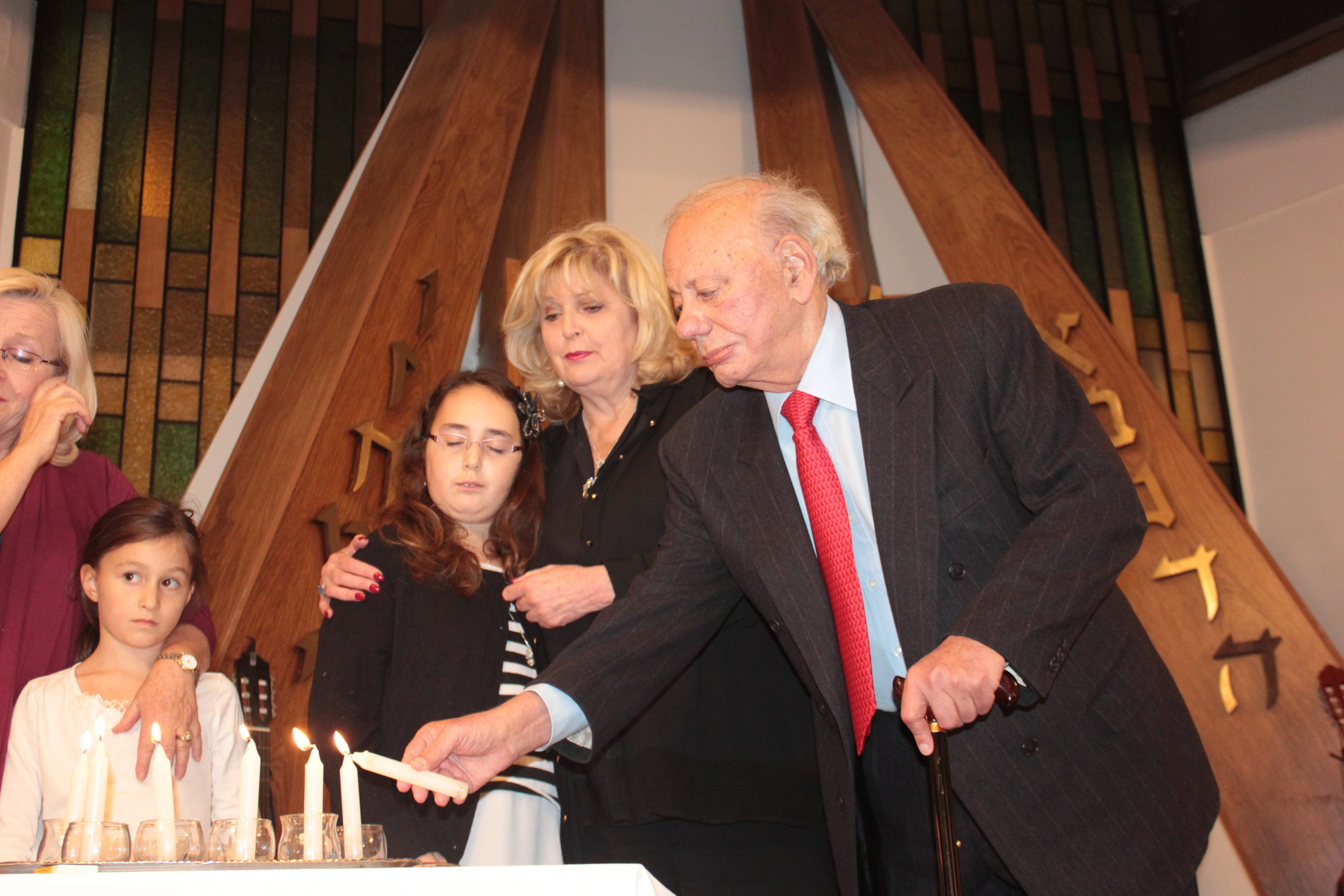
Rolat lighting a memorial candle on Kristallnacht at Congregation Habonim, Toronto Holocaust Education Week 2014

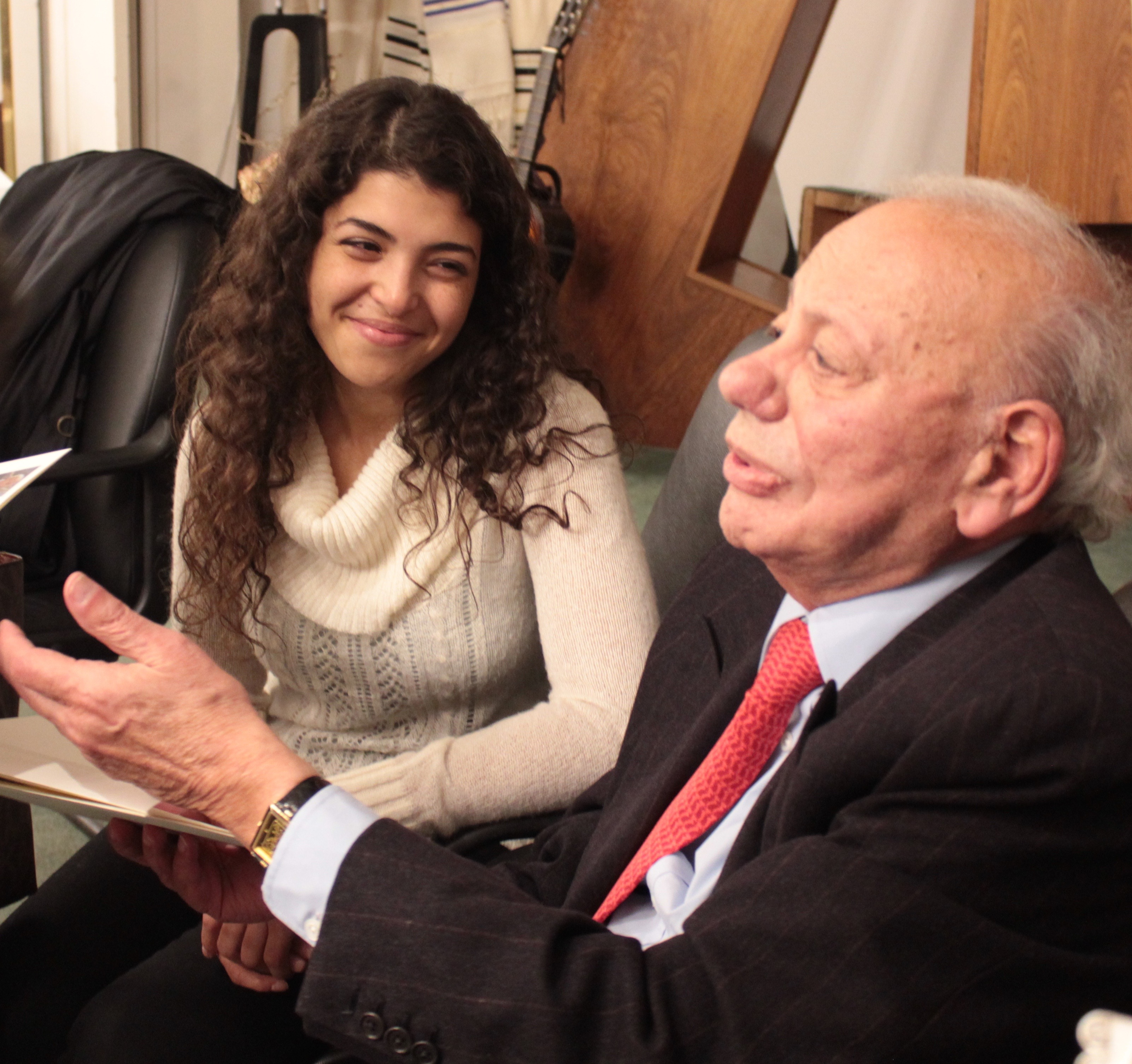
Rolat with audience at Congregation Habonim program, Toronto Holocaust Education Week 2014

On November 8, 2014, Rolat spoke at the Toronto premiere of the "Return of the Violin", as part of Toronto's Holocaust Education Week. "We opened the Museum on the 28th (of October 2014) 10 days ago. It was a wonderful, wonderful opening. I certainly am now so happy that really the most important task of my life which was Polin, The Museum of the History of Polish Jews [is completed] and that young people on the March of the Living who are coming to Poland will no longer see only the Auschwitz and Treblinka camps – they will also find out about [our] glorious, glorious thousand years in Poland and how much we accomplished in those days."

After the premiere of the "Return of the Violin", 14-year-old Tali Katz, a granddaughter of Holocaust survivors, composed "Six", inspired by the bravery of Sigmund Rolat, as the only member of his immediate family to survive the Holocaust.

On December 3, 2014, Rolat, Joshua Bell and Budd Mishkin took part in a discussion following the screening of "The Return of the Violin". The documentary film, sponsored by Rolat, chronicles the journey of the Gibson ex-Huberman Stradivarius now owned and played by Bell.

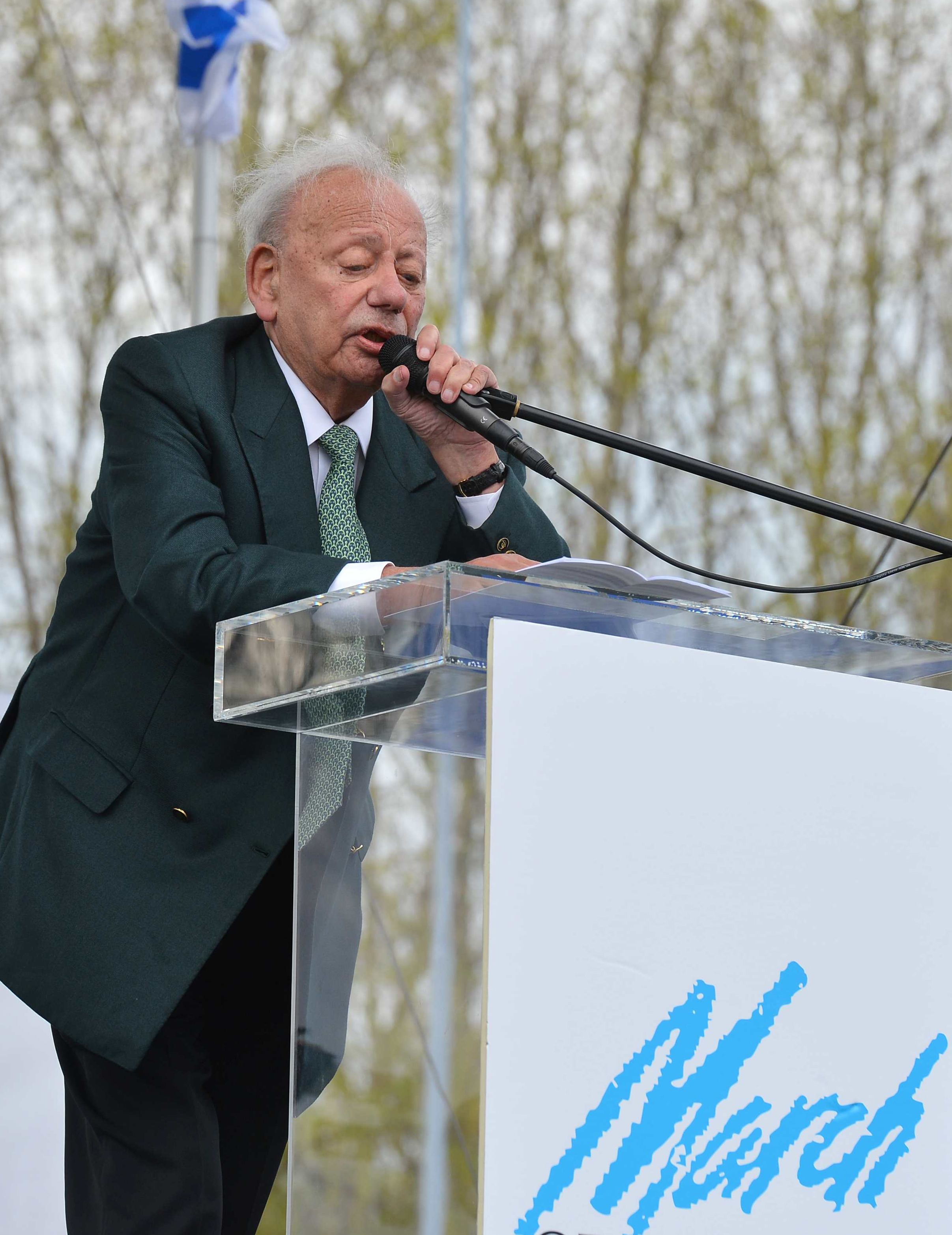
Rolat speaking at the International March of the Living 2015

On April 16, 2015, Sigmund Rolat was the guest of honor at the International March of the Living memorial ceremony in Auschwitz-Birkenau on Holocaust Remembrance Day. His eloquent speech delivered to some 10,000 young people and survivors appeared in both Polish and English media and was reprinted in more than 50 newspapers.

In his speech, Rolat stated that he had no choice but to remember the Holocaust, but challenged the young people – who do have a choice – to also remember, giving them four reasons to do so: solidarity with those who survived, the simple decency of keeping alive the memory of the victims by mourning their loss, and fear that this might happen again to others unless we learn from history. He concluded his remarks with a fourth reason to remember: gratitude "to those Poles who – like my Elka – risked their lives to save Jews from the chimneys of Auschwitz. From the ghetto walls of Czestochowa. From the abyss. And our gratitude toward them is the fourth reason to remember."

On April 18, 2015, Rolat spoke at a March of the Living event at the University of Warsaw honoring Survivors, Liberators, and Righteous Among the Nations. In his speech to students from around the world, he advocated for the building of a monument to the Righteous Among the Nations in Warsaw. He said: "We will say thank you properly and in years long from now your children will come here and they will also see that monument to thank those who saved us.."

On June 11, 2015, at an event at the Museum of Jewish Heritage, New York City Mayor Bill de Blasio honored Rolat, by proclaiming it "Sigmund Rolat Day" in the City of New York.

== Personal life and death ==
Sigmund Rolat had four children, including Geoffrey, Samantha and Amanda. He lived in New York City and spent time in Bal Harbour, Florida.

Sigmund died in New York City on May 19, 2024, at the age of 93.
