= Patricia Travers =

American violinist and actress (1927–2010)

- Born: December 5, 1927; Clifton, New Jersey
- Died: February 9, 2010 (aged 82)
- Occupations: Actress, child prodigy
- Instrument: Violin
- Formerly of: New York Philharmonic

Patricia Travers (December 5, 1927 – February 9, 2010) was an American violinist. She was child prodigy who apparently withdrew from public performances at age 23. She lived in Clifton, New Jersey, her entire life.

== Career ==
Travers began violin lessons at age four which led to her first public performance at age six in the Falls Village, Connecticut, summer music festival, Music Mountain. She later performed on CBS radio 'Ford Sunday Hour' show when she was nine.

She soloed with the New York Philharmonic Orchestra under Efrem Kurtz at Lewisohn Stadium at age ten where she played "Symphonie Espagnole" In 1940, she played the Mendelssohn Concerto with the Léon Barzin-conducted National Orchestral Association at Carnegie Hall.

She appeared in the 1941 film There's Magic in Music with Irra Petina, Diana Lynn, and Allan Jones. In addition to a speaking role, she played Anton Rubinstein's "Romance in E flat" in the film. She was part of a cultural exchange program after WWII which had her touring Germany.

Dai-keong Lee wrote "Incantation and Dance" for Travers which she performed in a 1947 recital at Carnegie Hall.

Lorin Maazel conducted several performances with her as part of the Pittsburgh Symphony. She also performed Brahms' Violin Concerto with the Boston Symphony Orchestra several times in 1951.

Her few commercial recordings include Charles Ives's Sonata No.2 for Violin and Piano (the first complete recording of that work), along with the first recording of Roger Sessions' Duo for Violin and Piano, made for Columbia Records in 1950.

== Instruments ==
She owned the 1732 'Tom Taylor' Stradivarius from 1938 to 1954, which was sold to a benefactor who loaned it to Cal State Northridge; the violin was later owned briefly by Joshua Bell. She also used a 1733 Giuseppe Guarneri del Gesù violin.

== Later life ==
There are no published explanations of why she stopped public performances. According to one source, who corresponded with Travers in 2007, she gave up concertizing to help her parents manage their varied business interests, which included considerable real-estate holdings. She lived quietly in her childhood home and managed several commercial rental properties that her father had built and caring for her mother Veronica in later years, moving to a condominium shortly after her mother died in 1994.

She is buried in St Joseph cemetery in Millbrook, New York.
