= Nuremberg International Human Rights Award =

German human rights award

- Awarded for: committing oneself to human rights, in an exemplary manner
- Location: Nuremberg
- Country: Germany
- Reward: 25.000€ (US$26,820)
- First award: September 17, 1995
- Website: https://www.nuernberg.de/internet/menschenrechte_e/menschenrechtspreis_e.html

The Nuremberg International Human Rights Award (German: Internationaler Nürnberger Menschenrechtspreis) is a biennial German award founded on September 17, 1995. The date chosen is significant; 60 years earlier, the Nuremberg Race Laws were adopted. Also, on September 17, 1939, Poland was invaded by the Soviet Union, soon after the German invasion that marked the beginning of World War II. Furthermore, the award was introduced 50 years after the end of the Second World War.

== Origin and intentions ==
The award is endowed with €25,000 and is presented every two years to individuals or groups who have, in an exemplary manner, committed themselves to human rights, sometimes at considerable personal risk. The amount mentioned was €15,000 in the first years but has meanwhile been raised to €25,000. The awarding ceremony usually takes place in the Nuremberg Opera House and is followed by the Nuremberg Peace Table, an outdoor citizens′ festival in honour of the prizewinners, in the Way of Human Rights.

== Prizewinners ==
As of 2023, the prize has been awarded to 6 women and 11 men from 17 countries. In 1997 and 2003, two persons were decorated.

Year	Name	Country	Awarded for
1995	Sergei Kovalev	Russia	his committed fight against the war in Chechnya
1997	Khémaïs Chammari	Tunisia	their peace activities in the Middle East
1997	Abie Nathan	Israel	their peace activities in the Middle East
1999	Fatimata M'Baye	Mauritania	her fight against discrimination of black African ethnic groups
2001	Samuel Ruiz García	Mexico	his struggle for the rights of indigenous peoples
2003	Teesta Setalvad	India	their committed fight against prejudice, hatred and violence
2003	Ibn Abdur Rehman	Pakistan	their committed fight against prejudice, hatred and violence
2005	Tamara Chikunova	Uzbekistan	her engagement against death penalty and torture
2007	Eugénie Musayidire	Rwanda	her reconciliation work between the two enemy tribes, the Hutu and the Tutsi, in Rwanda
2009	Abdolfattah Soltani	Iran	his struggle for human rights in his home country
2011	Hollman Morris	Colombia	his commitment to respect for human rights in Colombia
2013	Kasha Jacqueline Nabagesera	Uganda	her courageous fight against homophobia and for sexual self-determination in Uganda
2015	Amirul Haque Amin	Bangladesh	his fight for workers' rights in the textile and garment industry
2017	Caesar	Syria	his courage (and his supporting Group's) in bringing the systematic torture and mass murders in Syria to the attention of the world public
2019	Rodrigo Mundaca	Chile	his remarkable courage in his fight for the fundamental right to water
2021	Sayragul Sauytbay	China	her admirable courage to report about crimes against Muslim minorities in Xinjiang
2023	Malcolm Bidali	Kenya	coming out fearlessly against abuse and exploitation of migrant workers in Qatar
2025	The Parents Circle-Families Forum	Israel; Palestine	keeping open the communication between Israeli and Palestine people, even in the hardest of times
2027	David Yambio	South Sudan	his fight against exploitation and torture, and for the rights of refugees

== Jury ==
An international jury, headed by the Lord Mayor of Nuremberg, chooses the winner of the Human Rights Award, every two years. The members of the jury are elected for a period of four years. The current members are

Name	Country	Function
Gladys Acosta Vargas	Peru	Expert on the Convention on the Elimination of All Forms of Discrimination Against Women (CEDAW)
Iris Berben	Germany	Actress; ambassador for the “Room of Names” in the Memorial to the Murdered Jews of Europe
Wolfgang Kaleck	Germany	Civil rights attorney; founder and Secretary General of the European Center for Constitutional and Human Rights (ECCHR) in Berlin
Noa Karavan-Cohen	Israel	Realisation of cultural projects, international conferences and documentary film projects longtime assistant to her father Dani Karavan who created the Way of Human Rights
Morten Kjærum	Denmark	Chair of the European Council on Refugees and Exiles (ECRE)
Eva Pils	Germany	Interdisciplinary expert on international human rights, Holder of the Alexander von Humboldt Chair in Human Rights Law
Marcus König	Germany	Lord Mayor of the City of Nuremberg

The high standing of this jury and the support lent by the United Nations, UNESCO and renowned non-government organisations have contributed to the award having won considerable international repute and its intention of protecting human rights defenders taking effect.
