= Way of Human Rights =

Outdoor sculpture in Nuremberg, Germany

Coordinates: 49°26′53″N 11°04′30″E

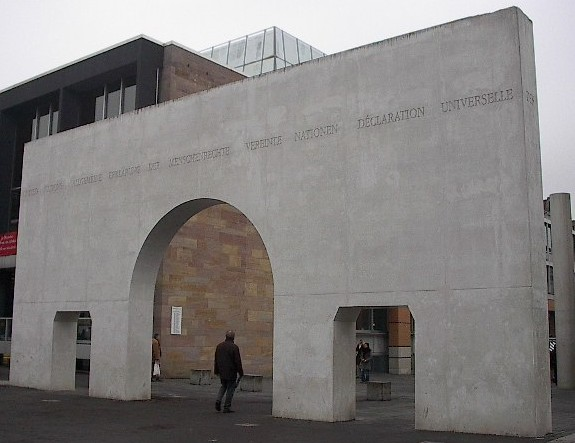
North gate of the Way of Human Rights

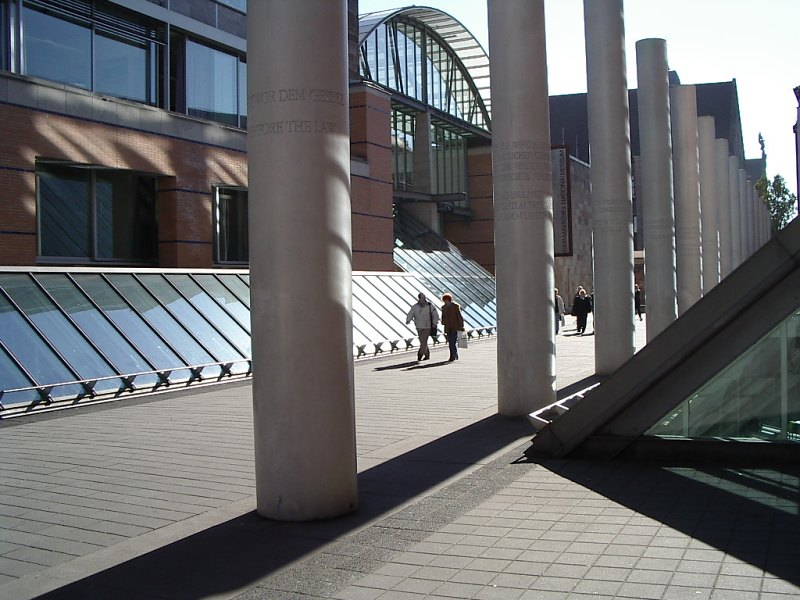
Way of Human Rights (October 17, 2003)

The Way of Human Rights (German: Straße der Menschenrechte) is a monumental outdoor sculpture in Nuremberg, Germany. It was opened on 24 October 1993. It is sited on the street between the new and old buildings of the Germanisches Nationalmuseum, connecting Kornmarkt street and the medieval city wall.

In 1988, a twelve-person jury from the Germanisches Nationalmuseum held a design competition to decide on the artistic design of the Kartäusergasse street in Nuremberg.

The winner was a proposal by Israeli artist Dani Karavan consisting of a gate, 27 round pillars made of white concrete, two pillars buried in the ground showing only a round plate, and one columnar oak, for a total of 30 pillars.

Engraved in each pillar is one article of the Universal Declaration of Human Rights in German and another language. The pillars are 8 metres in height, 80 cm in diameter, and spaced regularly at 5 metres along an axis. The north gate mirrors the medieval city gate located at the south end of the street.

The site of project has a layered history, including the remnants of a monastery, the medieval city wall, buildings designed by Sep Ruf in the 1950s and 1960s, and a glass-enclosed entrance designed by the firm ME DI UM in 1993.

This sculpture is part of Nuremberg's efforts to shake off its Nazi-era reputation as the "City of the Party Rallies" and reinvent itself as a "City of Peace and Human Rights".

In 2001, Nuremberg was honored for this attempt at transformation with the UNESCO Prize for Human Rights Education, the Way of Human Rights being specifically cited. The monument is intended as both a repudiation of past crimes and a permanent reminder that human rights are still regularly violated. Nuremberg's prize for human rights, the Nuremberg International Human Rights Award, is awarded on the site every two years.

== See also ==
- Ursula Peters: Dani Karavan: Weg der Menschenrechte, in: Ursula Peters: Moderne Zeiten. Die Sammlung zum 20. Jahrhundert, in Zusammenarbeit mit Andrea Legde, Nürnberg 2000 (Kulturgeschichtliche Spaziergänge im Germanischen Nationalmuseum, Bd.3), S.274-281.
