= Bronisław Huberman =

Polish violinist (1882–1947)

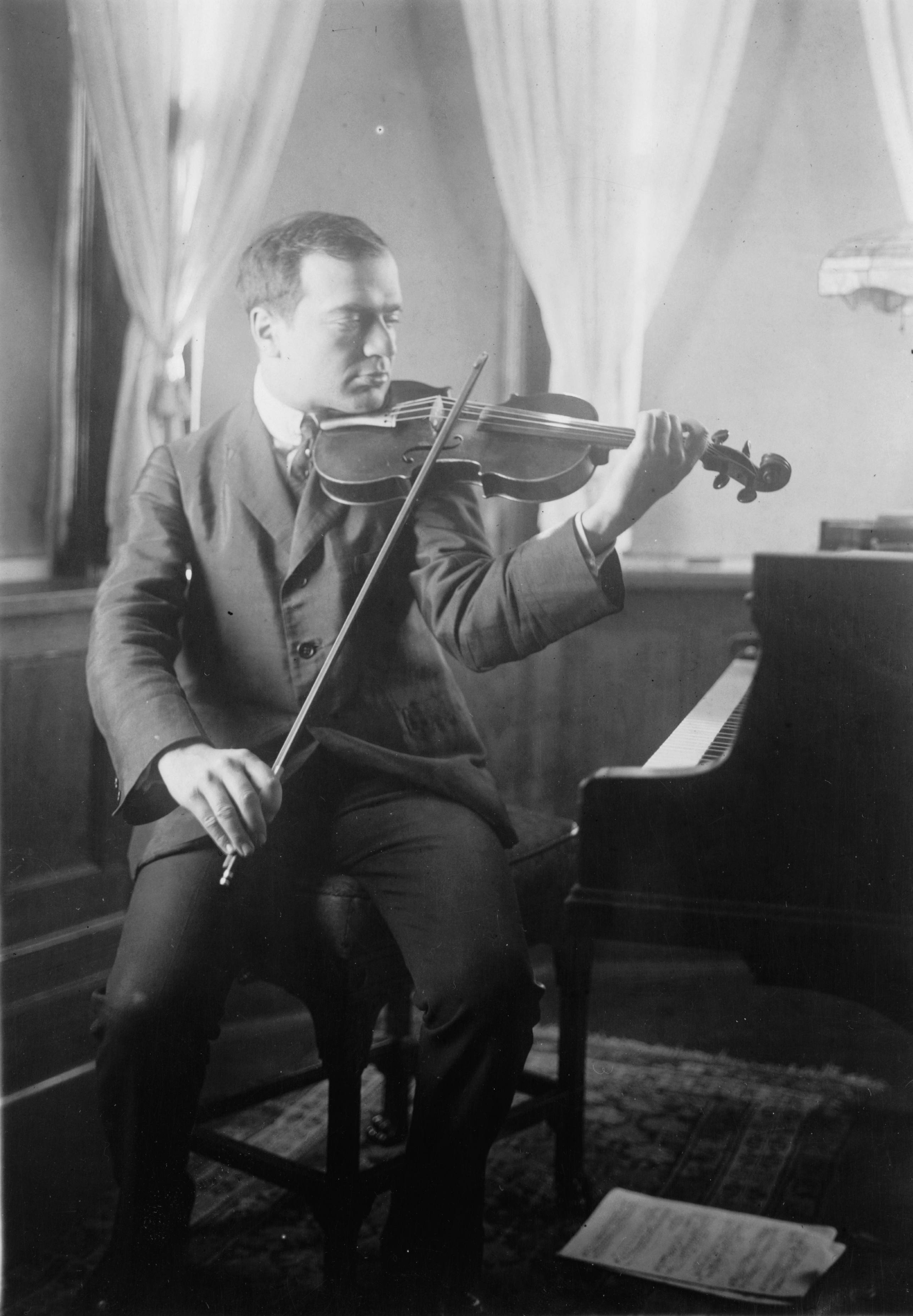
- Born: 19 December 1882; Częstochowa, Congress Poland, Russian Empire
- Died: 16 June 1947 (aged 64); Corsier-sur-Vevey, Switzerland
- Education: Warsaw Conservatory
- Occupation: Classical violinist

Bronisław Huberman (19 December 1882 – 16 June 1947) was a Polish violinist. He was known for his individualistic interpretations and was praised for his tone color, expressiveness, and flexibility. The Gibson ex-Huberman Stradivarius violin, which bears his name, was stolen twice and recovered once during the period in which he owned the instrument. Huberman is also remembered for founding the Israel Philharmonic Orchestra (then known as the Palestine Symphony Orchestra) and thus providing refuge from the Third Reich for nearly 1,000 European Jews.

== Biography ==
Huberman was born in Częstochowa, Poland, to a Jewish family. In his youth he was a pupil of Mieczysław Michałowicz and Maurycy Rosen at the Warsaw Conservatory, and of Isidor Lotto in Paris. In 1892 he studied under Joseph Joachim in Berlin. Despite being only ten years old, he dazzled Joachim with performances of Louis Spohr, Henri Vieuxtemps, and the transcription of a Frédéric Chopin nocturne. However, the two did not get along well, and after Huberman's fourteenth birthday he took no more lessons. In 1893 he toured the Netherlands and Belgium as a virtuoso performer. Around this time, the six-year-old Arthur Rubinstein attended one of Huberman's concerts. Rubinstein's parents invited Huberman back to their house and the two boys struck up what would become a lifetime friendship. In 1894 Adelina Patti invited Huberman to participate in her farewell gala in London, which he did, and in the following year he actually eclipsed her in appearances in Vienna. In 1896 he performed the violin concerto of Johannes Brahms in the presence of the composer, who was stunned by the quality of his playing.

He married the German actress Elza Galafrés (also described as a singer and ballerina). They had a son, Johannes, but the marriage did not last. She later met the Hungarian composer and pianist Ernő Dohnányi, but neither Huberman nor Dohnányi's then wife would consent to divorce. Elza and Dohnányi nevertheless had a child out of wedlock in 1917, and in 1919, after Huberman had granted her a divorce, she married Dohnányi, who then adopted Huberman's son Johannes.

In the 1920s and early 1930s, Huberman toured around Europe and North America with the pianist Siegfried Schultze and performed on the most famous stages (Carnegie in New York, Scala in Milan, Musikverein in Vienna, Konzerthaus in Berlin....). Over the course of many years, the duet Huberman-Schultze were regularly invited in private by European Royal Families. Countless recordings of these artists were done during that period at the "Berliner Rundfunk", but were unfortunately destroyed during the Second World War.

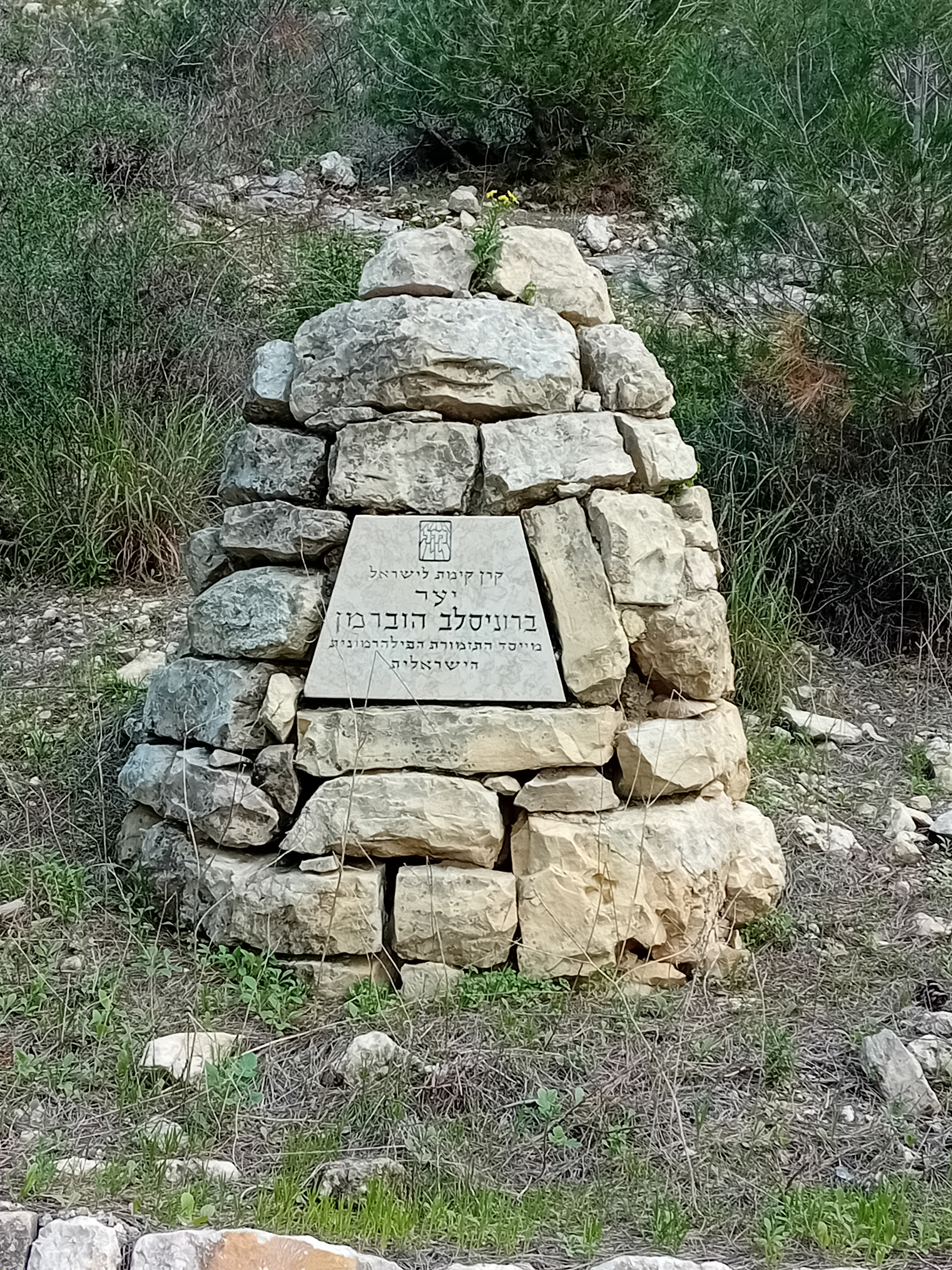
The monument dedicating a forest between Jerusalem and Beit Zayit to Bronisław Huberman

In 1937, a year before the Anschluss, Huberman left Vienna and took refuge in Switzerland. The following year, his career nearly ended as a result of an airplane accident in Sumatra in which his wrist and two fingers of his left hand were broken. After intensive and painful retraining he was able to resume performing. At the onset of the Second World War, Huberman was touring South Africa and was unable to return to his home in Switzerland until after the war. Shortly thereafter he fell ill from exhaustion and never regained his strength. He died in Corsier-sur-Vevey, Switzerland, on 16 June 1947, at age 64.

== Palestine Symphony Orchestra ==
In 1929 Huberman first visited Palestine and developed his vision of establishing classical music in the Promised Land. In 1933, during the Nazis' rise to power, Huberman declined invitations from Wilhelm Furtwängler to return to preach a "musical peace", but wrote instead an open letter to German intellectuals inviting them to remember their essential values. In 1936 he founded the Palestine Symphony Orchestra (which upon the establishment of the State of Israel in 1948 was renamed the Israel Philharmonic Orchestra). For the orchestra, Huberman recruited leading Jewish musicians from Europe, showing "the prescience to realize that far more than a new job was at stake for these artists"—for "if it hadn't been for Huberman, dozens of musicians and their families—nearly 1000 people in all—would nearly certainly have died if they had stayed in countries including Germany, Austria, Poland and Hungary." He was assisted by violinist Jacob Surowicz. Conductor William Steinberg, then known as Hans Wilhelm Steinberg, trained the orchestra. The first concert, on 26 December 1936, was conducted by Arturo Toscanini; Huberman had invited the Italian maestro when he heard of his refusing to perform in Germany to protest the Nazi takeover. The 2012 documentary film Orchestra of Exiles by writer, director and producer Josh Aronson recreates Huberman's work creating the orchestra through interviews and reenactments. Featuring interviews with Zubin Mehta, Pinchas Zukerman, Joshua Bell, and many other notable musicians, the film details how Huberman rescued nearly 1000 Jewish musicians and their families and created the Palestine Symphony Orchestra. The film also details how famous Jews and leading historical figures, such as Albert Einstein, were vital in creating the orchestra.

== Stradivarius theft ==
Before 1936, Huberman's principal instrument for his concerts was a 1713-vintage Stradivarius "Gibson," which was named after one of its early owners, the English violinist George Alfred Gibson. It was stolen twice. In 1919, it was taken from Huberman's Vienna hotel room but recovered by the police within 3 days. The second time was in New York City. On 28 February 1936, while giving a concert at Carnegie Hall, Huberman switched the Stradivarius "Gibson" with his newly acquired Guarnerius violin, leaving the Stradivarius in his dressing room during intermission. It was stolen either by New York City nightclub musician Julian Altman or a friend of his. Altman kept the violin for the next half-century. Huberman's insurance company, Lloyd's of London, paid him US$30,000 for the loss in 1936.

Altman went on to become a violinist with the National Symphony Orchestra in Washington, D.C., and performed with the stolen Stradivarius for many years. In 1985, Altman made a deathbed confession to his wife, Marcelle Hall, that he had stolen the violin. Two years later, she returned it to Lloyd's and collected a finder's fee of $263,000. The instrument underwent a 9-month restoration by J & A Beare Ltd., in London. In 1988, Lloyd's sold it for $1.2 million to British violinist Norbert Brainin. In October 2001, the American violinist Joshua Bell purchased it for just under $4,000,000.

The instrument, which is now known as the Gibson-Huberman, was the focus of the 2012 documentary The Return of the Violin by the Israeli television director Haim Hecht which featured interviews with musicians such as Joshua Bell, Zubin Mehta, Holocaust-survivor Sigmund Rolat and many other musicians.

== Honours ==
The town of Częstochowa renamed its orchestra as the Bronislaw Huberman Philharmonic in honor of its native violinist.

== Recordings ==
External audio
- You may hear Bronislaw Huberman performing Ludwig van Beethoven's Violin Concerto in D major, Op. 61 with George Szell conducting the Vienna Philharmonic Orchestra in 1934 Here on archive.org

Huberman made several commercial recordings of large-scale works, among which are:

- Beethoven: Violin Concerto (w. Vienna Philharmonic Orchestra, cond. George Szell) (Columbia Records, LX 509–13) (18–20 June 1934).
- Beethoven: Kreutzer Sonata (no. 9) (w. Ignaz Friedman, piano) (Columbia Records, C-67954/7D)
- Lalo: Symphonie Espagnole (omits 3rd mvmt.) (w. Vienna Philharmonic, cond. George Szell) (Columbia Records, C-68288/90D)
- Tchaikovsky: Violin Concerto (w. Berlin State Opera Orchestra, cond William Steinberg) (Columbia Records, C-67726/9D) (December 1928; originally for Odeon)
- Mendelssohn: Violin Concerto (2nd & 3rd mvmts) (w. Siegfried Schulze, piano) (Brunswick Records, PD-27242: acoustic)
- Also Bach Concerti 1 & 2, and Mozart Concerto 3.
- Several other large works exist in off-air broadcast recordings, including the Brahms concerto.
