= Regensburg Synagogue =

Orthodox synagogue in Regensburg, Germany

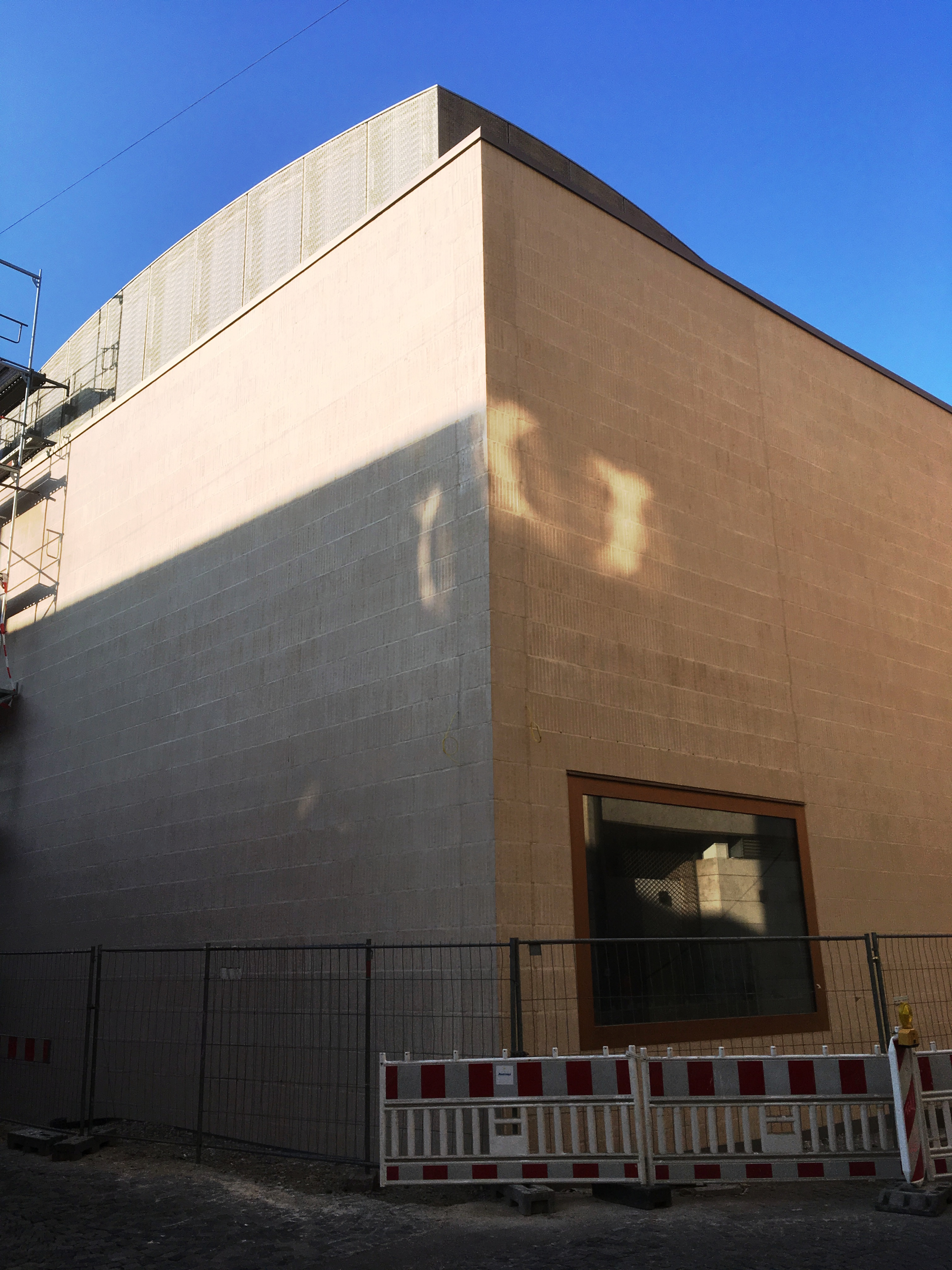
- Synagogue under construction, November 2018

- Location of the former synagogue in Bavaria

Religion
- Affiliation: Orthodox Judaism
- Rite: Nusach Ashkenaz
- Ecclesiastical or organizational status: Synagogue: (1912–1938); (since 1945)
- Status: Active

Location
- Location: Regensburg, Bavaria
- Country: Germany
- Interactive map of Regensburg Synagogue
- Coordinates: 49°01′06″N 12°05′45″E

Architecture
- Architect: Volker Staab (2019)
- Type: Synagogue architecture
- Style: Modernist (2019)
- Completed: 1. 1227; 2. 1841; 3. 1912; 4. 2019
- Construction cost: €9 million (2019)
- Destroyed: 1. 1517; 2. 1907; 3. November 1938 (during Kristallnacht
- Interior area: 320 m^{2} (3,400 sq ft)

The Regensburg Synagogue is an Orthodox Jewish congregation and synagogue, located in Regensburg (also known as Ratisbon), in Bavaria, southern Germany. Synagogues were completed in 1227, 1841 and again in 1912; each destroyed; most recently by Nazis on November 9, 1938, during Kristallnacht.

In 1945, the Ashkenazi congregation began to worship from a stone prayer hall, located at Am Brixener Hof 2, in Regensburg. In 2019, a new synagogue was opened, designed by Volker Staab in the Modernist style.

== History ==
The earliest written record of Jewish life in Regensburg dates from 981 making it the oldest Jewish community in Bavaria.

=== First synagogue ===
The original synagogue was erected between 1210 and 1227, in the Old Romanesque style on the site of the former Jewish hospital, in the center of the ghetto, where the present Neue Pfarre stands. Two etchings made by Albrecht Altdorfer of the synagogue shortly before it was destroyed on February 22, 1519, provide the first portrait of an actual architectural monument in European printmaking. In 1519 following the death of Emperor Maximilian, who had long been a protector of the Jews in the imperial cities, extracting from them substantial taxes in exchange, the city of Regensburg, which blamed its economic troubles on its prosperous Jewish community, expelled the 500 Jews. The Jews themselves had demolished the interior of their venerable synagogue, on the site of which a chapel was built in honor of the Virgin. According to a chronicle the exiles settled, under the protection of the Duke of Bavaria, on the opposite bank of the Danube, in Stadt-am-Hof, and in villages in the vicinity; from these they were expelled in the course of the same century.

=== Second synagogue ===
In 1669 Jews were again permitted to reside in Regensburg but it was not until April 2, 1841 that the community was able to dedicate its new synagogue. In 1907 however, it was demolished for fear of collapse.

=== Third synagogue ===
Rebuilt in 1912 at a different place, when the town had a Jewish population of about 600, it was destroyed by the Nazis on November 9, 1938, during Kristallnacht.

== Gallery ==
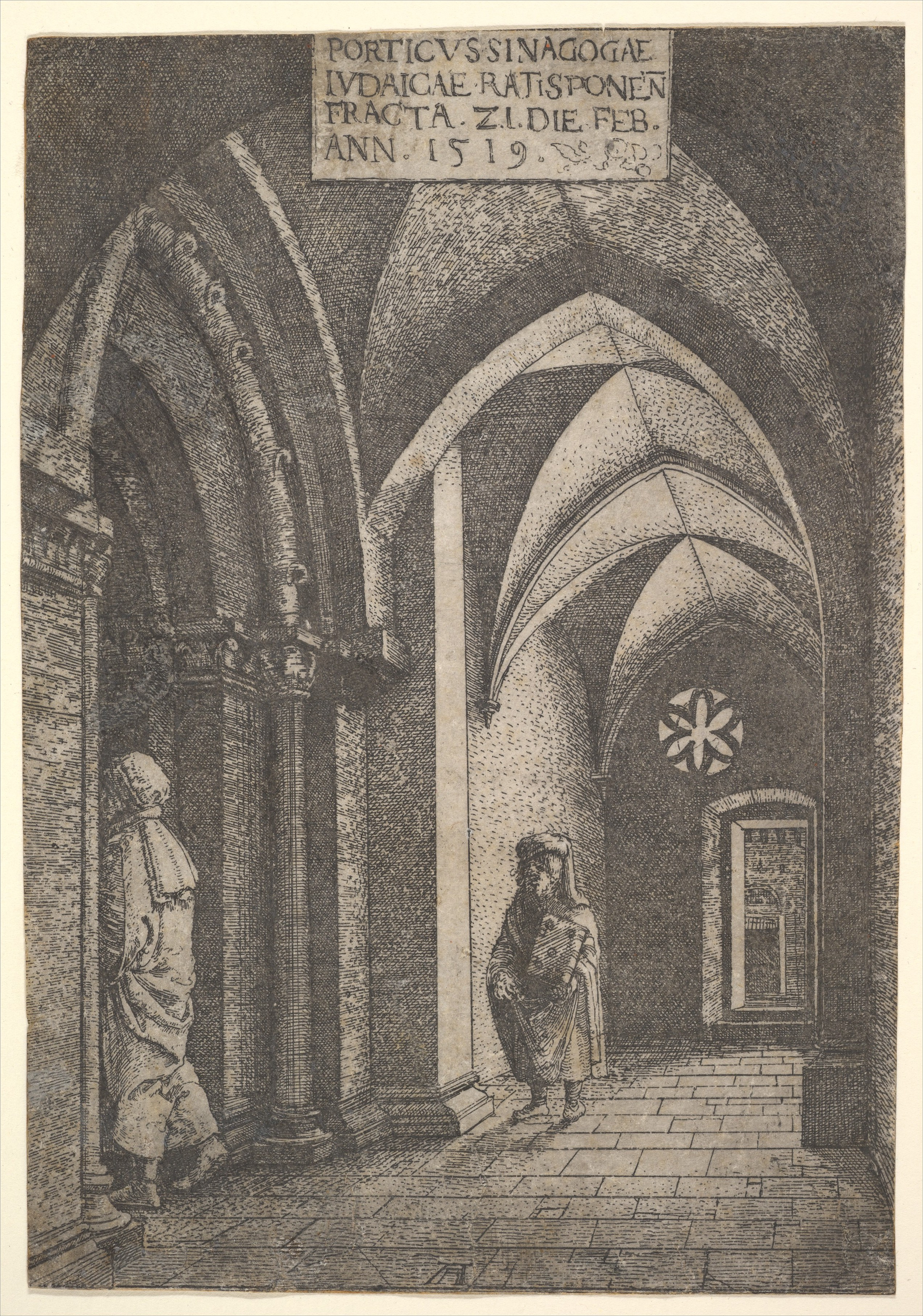
The entrance hall of the Regensburg Synagogue, Albrecht Altdorfer, 1519

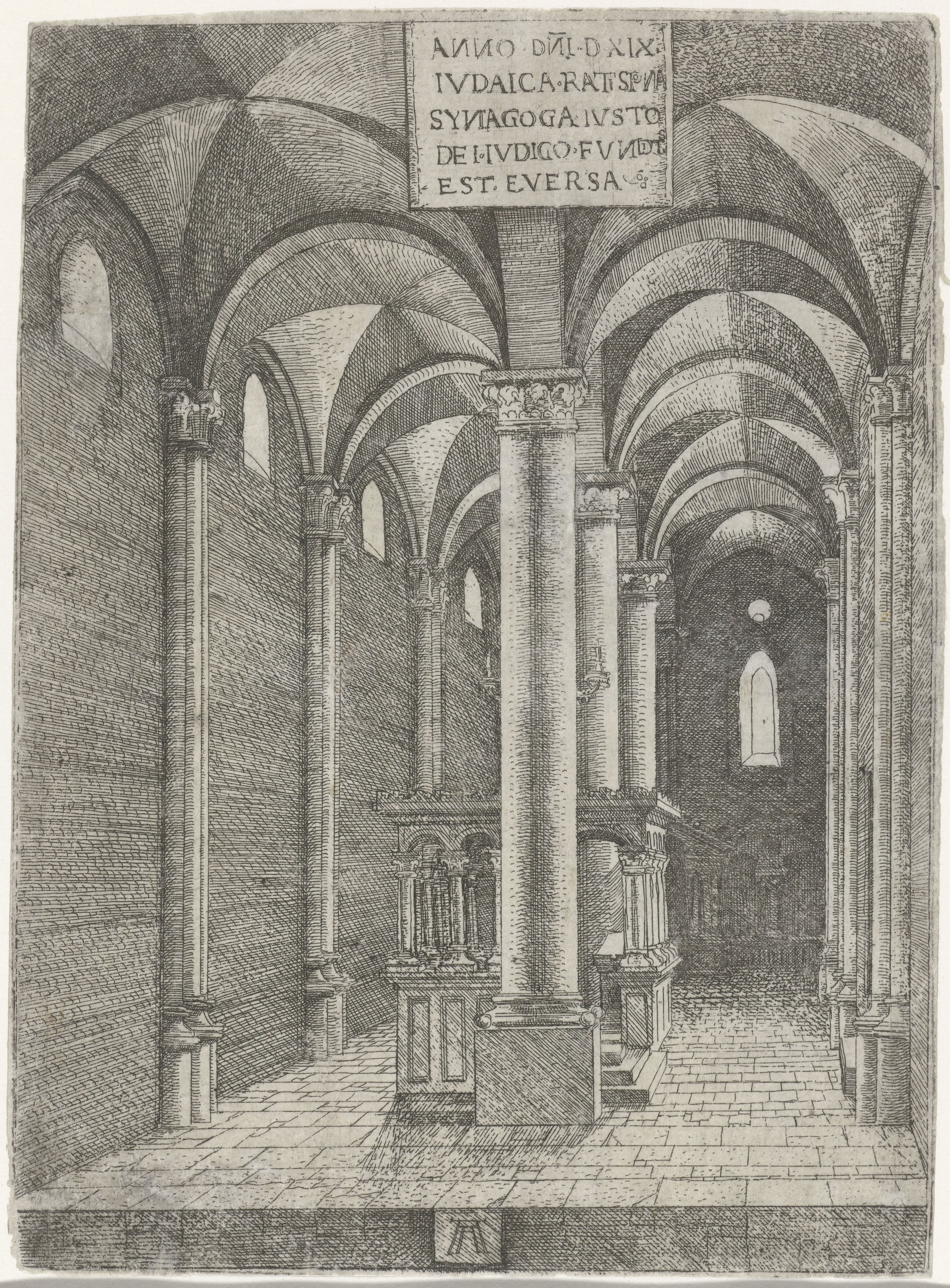
The double-naved interior with bimah between columns, 1519

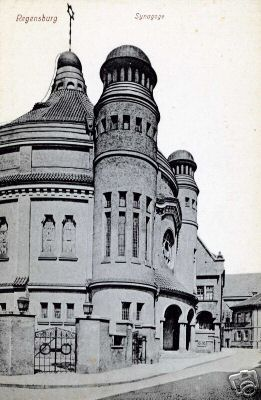
Postcard of the former synagogue in c. 1915

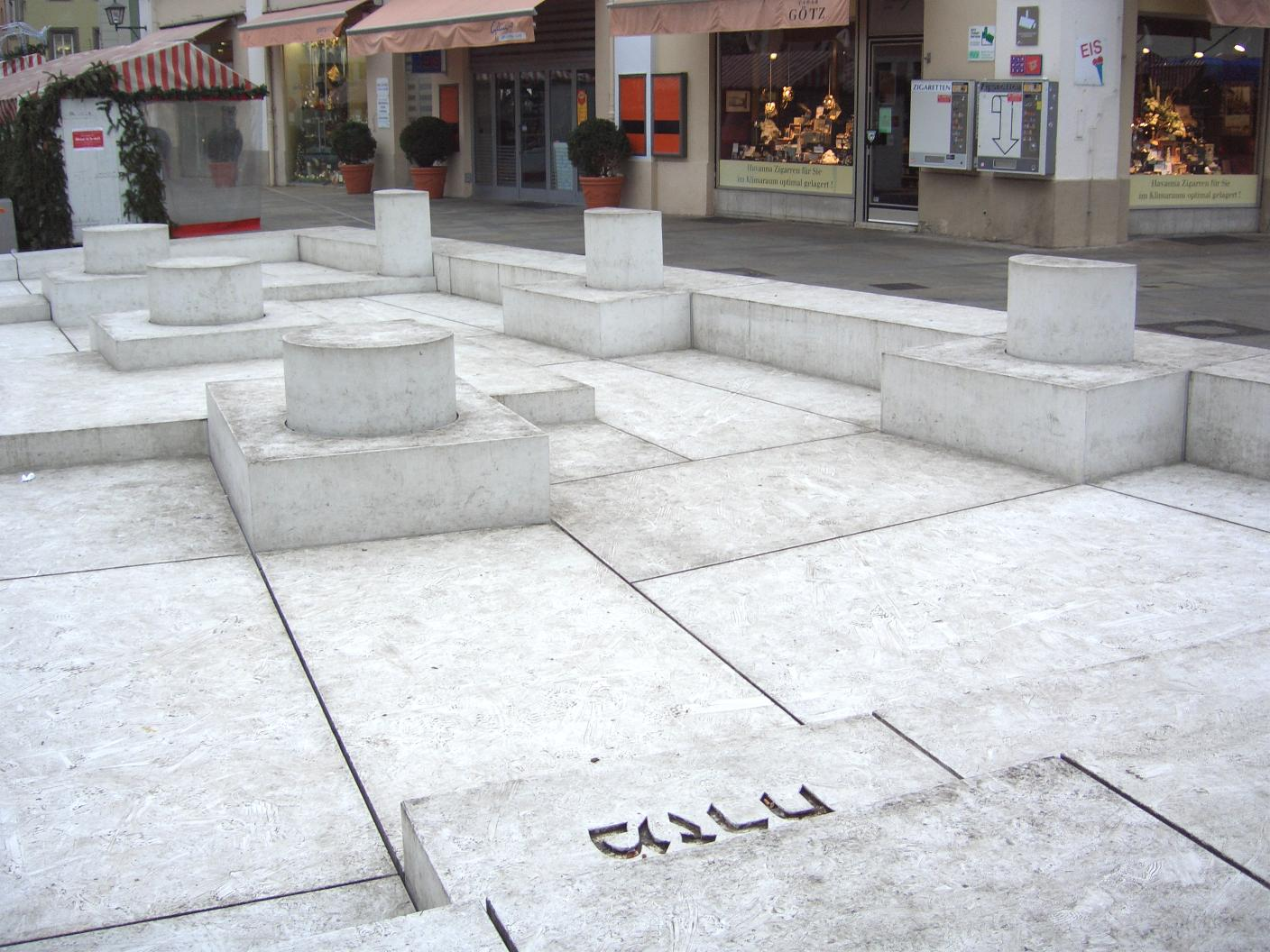
Memorial created by Dani Karavan in 2005 that depicts the foundation of the synagogue.

== See also ==
- History of the Jews in Regensburg
- List of synagogues in Germany (in German)

== Sources ==
- Media related to Synagogue of Regensburg (1227–1519) at Wikimedia Commons
- Media related to Synagogue of Regensburg (1945 - 2019) at Wikimedia Commons
- The Jewish Encyclopedia: Ratisbon
