= Laura Wilson Barker =

English composer, violinist and pianist

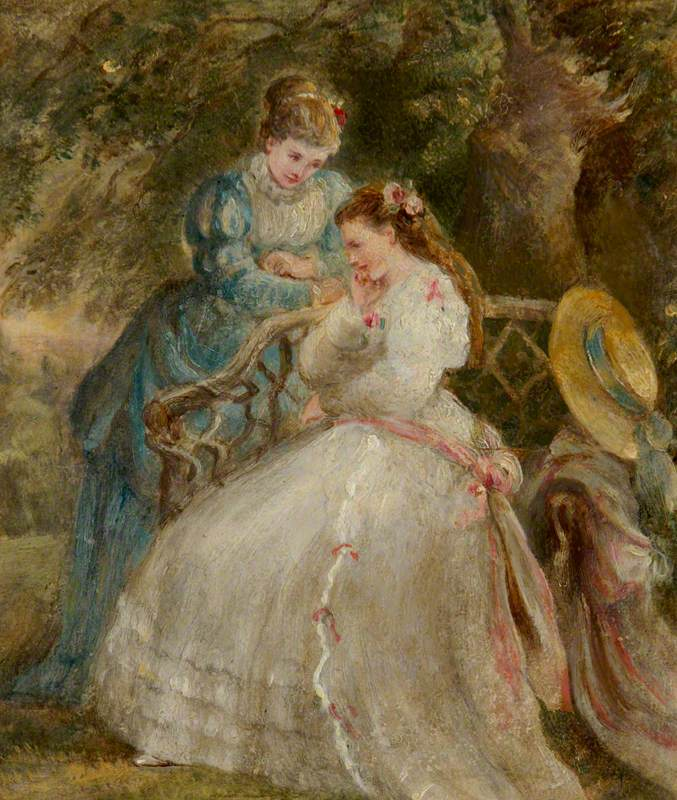
Kate Terry and Dame Ellen Terry on a Garden Seat in 'The Hunchback' by Sheridan Knowles, painting by Laura Wilson Barker, c.1866, oil on paper, 8.1 in x 6.5 in

Laura Wilson Barker (6 March 1819 – 22 May 1905), was a composer, performer and artist, sometimes also referred to as Laura Barker, Laura W Taylor or (after her marriage in 1855) as "Mrs Tom Taylor".

== Career ==
Barker was born in Thirkleby, North Yorkshire, the third daughter of a clergyman, the Rev. Thomas Barker. She studied privately with Cipriani Potter and became an accomplished pianist and violinist. As a child prodigy Barker performed with both Louis Spohr and Paganini. She began composing in the mid-1830s - her Seven Romances for voice and guitar were published in 1837. From around 1843 until 1855 she taught music at York School for the Blind. During this period some of her compositions - including a symphony in manuscript, on 19 April 1845 - were performed at York Choral Society concerts.

On 19 June 1855 she married the English dramatist, critic, biographer, public servant and editor of Punch magazine Tom Taylor. Barker contributed music to at least one of her husband's plays, an overture and entr'acte to Joan of Arc (1871), and provided harmonizations as an appendix to his translation of Ballads and Songs of Brittany (1865).

Barker wrote several sonatas and a great many other pieces for the piano - including the Four Studies (1846) and Revolution Waltzes (1849) - which are now in the collection of her great great grandson, Rupert Stutchbury. There are also some variations for organ and other music. Other pieces include the cantata Enone (1850), the violin sonata A Country Walk (1860), theatre music for As You Like It, (April 1880), Songs of Youth (1884), string quartets, madrigals and solo songs. Her choral setting of Keats's A Prophecy, composed in 1850, was performed for the first time 49 years later at the Hovingham Festival in 1899. The composer was present.

Barker was also an artist of theatrical subjects. Several of her paintings hang at Smallhythe Place in Kent, Ellen Terry's house.

== Personal life ==
Barker owned a Stradivarius violin dating from 1732, which (suffering the same fate as its owner), was after her marriage known as the Tom Taylor Strad. It had been inherited from her mother, Jane Flower, who was the niece of the Rev. William Flower of York, who had acquired the violin in 1837.

Barker lived with her husband and family at 84 Lavender Sweep, Battersea. There were two children: the artist John Wycliffe Taylor (1859–1925), and Laura Lucy Arnold Taylor (1863–1940). The Sunday musical soirees at the house attracted many well-known attendees, including the Prince of Wales, Lewis Carroll, Charles Dickens, Henry Irving, Charles Reade, Alfred Tennyson, Clara Schumman, Ellen and Kate Terry and William Makepeace Thackeray.

Tom Taylor died suddenly at his home in 1880 at the age of 62. After his death, Barker retired to Porch House, Coleshill in Buckinghamshire, where she died on 22 May 1905, aged 86.

== Selected works ==
- Seven Romances for voice and guitar (1836)
- The Sprite Polka (1844) for piano
- Morceau Characteristique (1845), piano four hands
- Four Studies (1846) for piano
- Ode to the Passions (text William Collins 1846)
- Six Songs (1847)
- Dungeon Ghyll Force (1848), piano four hands
- Piano Sonata No. 1 (1849)
- Proteus: Fantasia (1849) for piano
- Revolution Waltzes (1849) for piano
- Enone, cantata (1850)
- A Prophesy, choir and orchestra (text Keats, 1850, fp. 1899)
- Six Songs (1852)
- Violin Sonata A Country Walk (1860)
- Music to Shakespeare's As You Like It (fp. 14 April 1880)
- Songs of Youth (1883)
