= Monument to the Negev Brigade =

Sculpture by Dani Karavan in Israel

Coordinates: 31.267°N 34.821°E

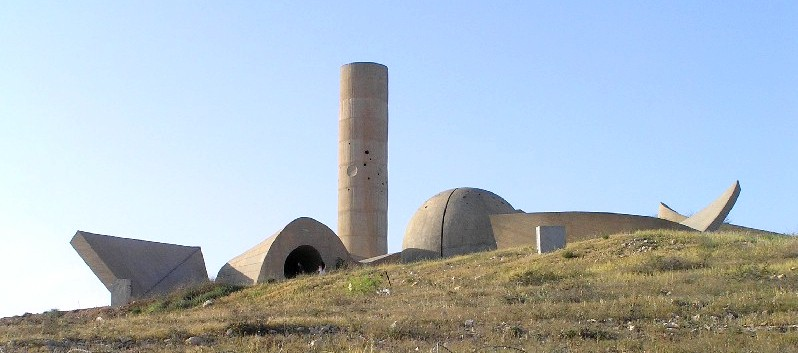
Negev Brigade Memorial

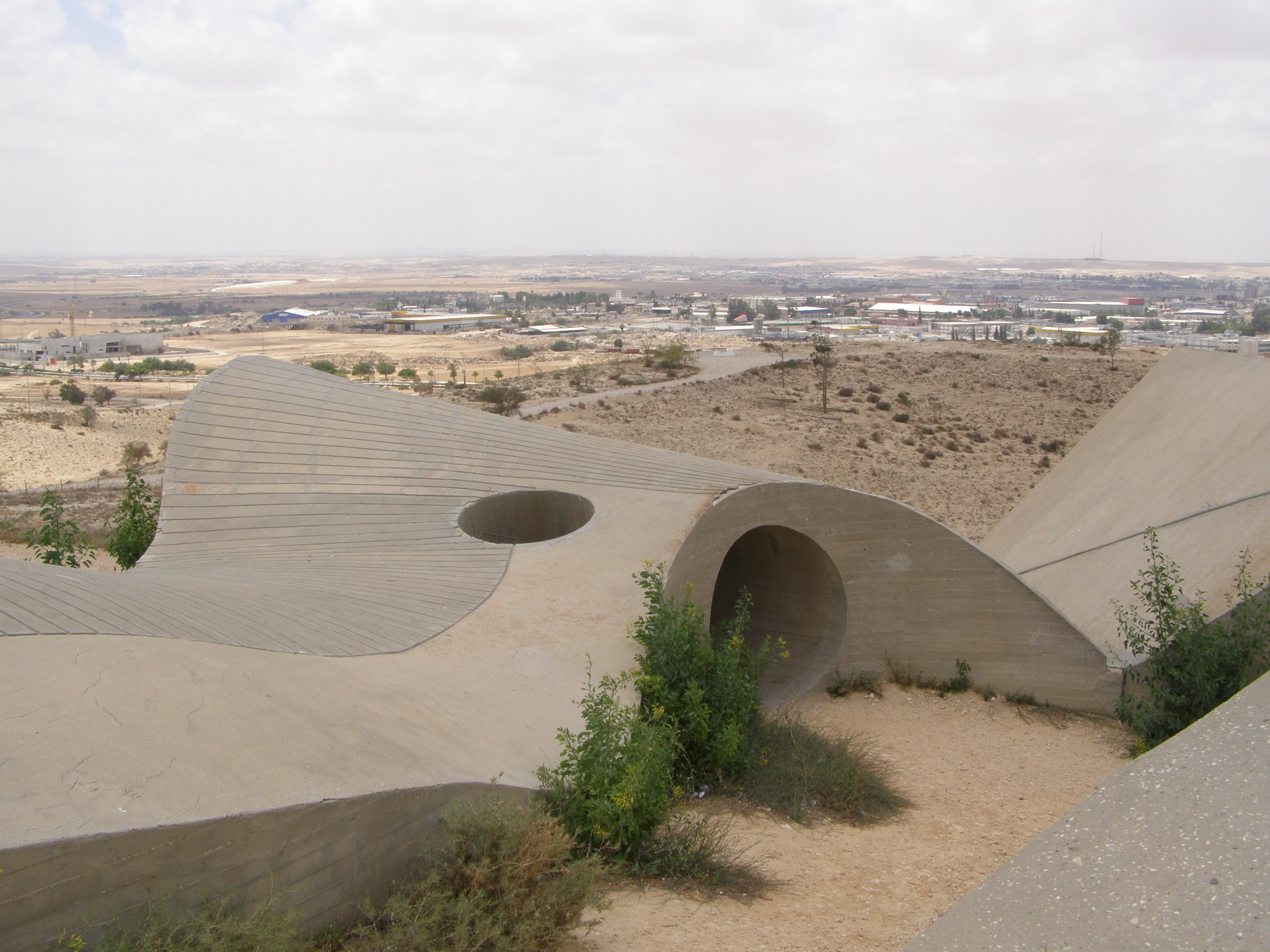
Negev Brigade Memorial

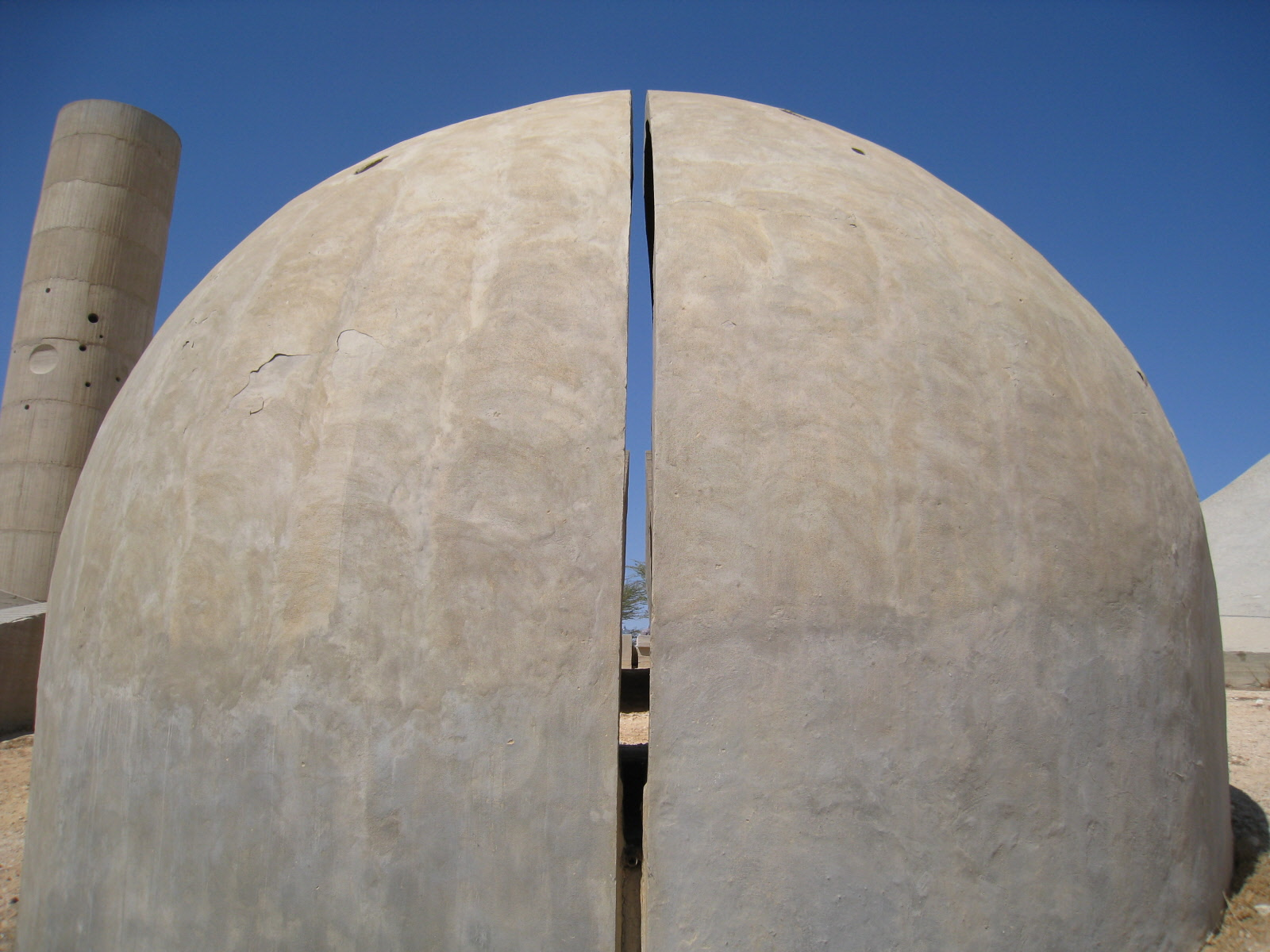
Negev Brigade Memorial

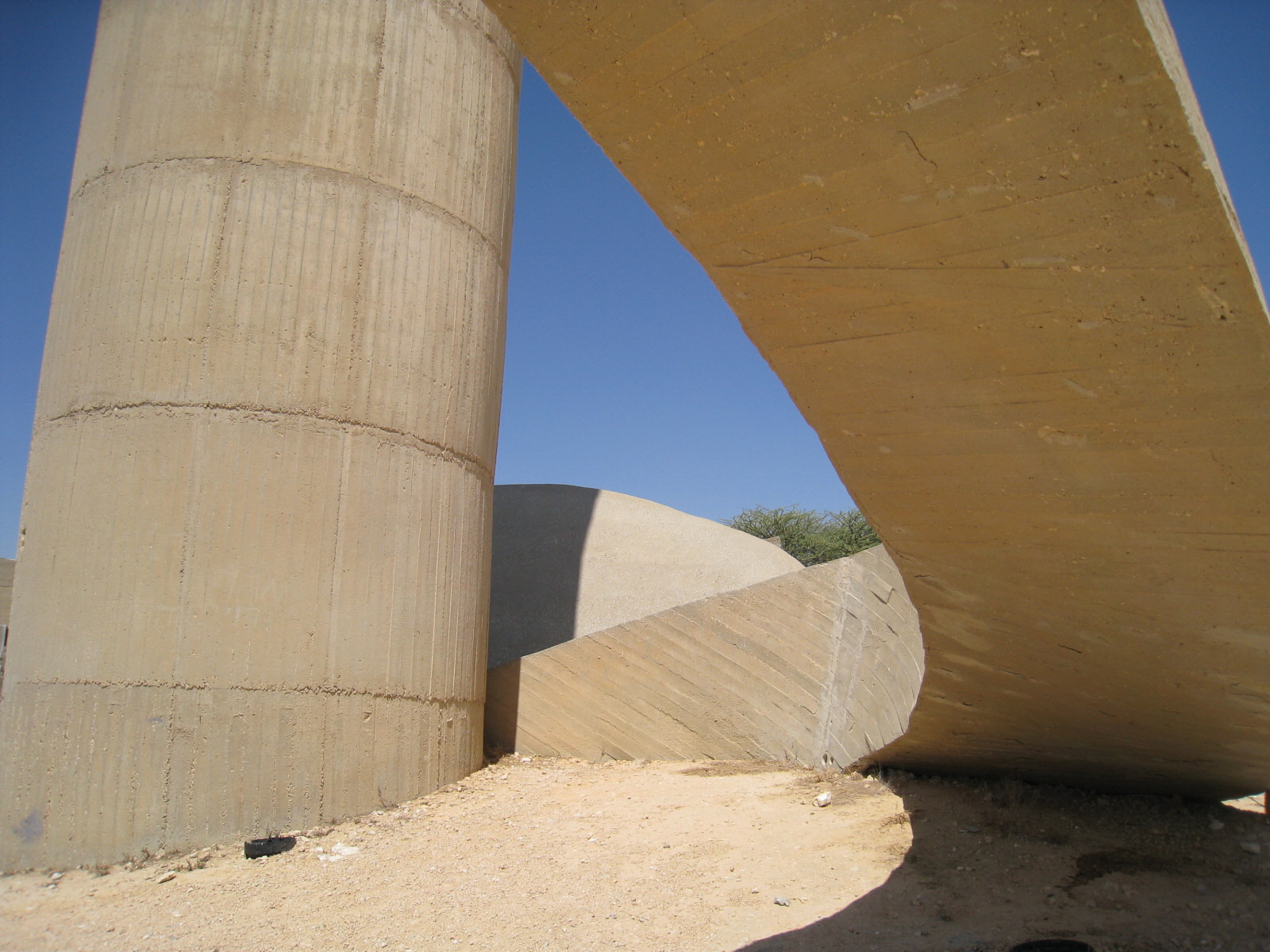
Negev Brigade Memorial

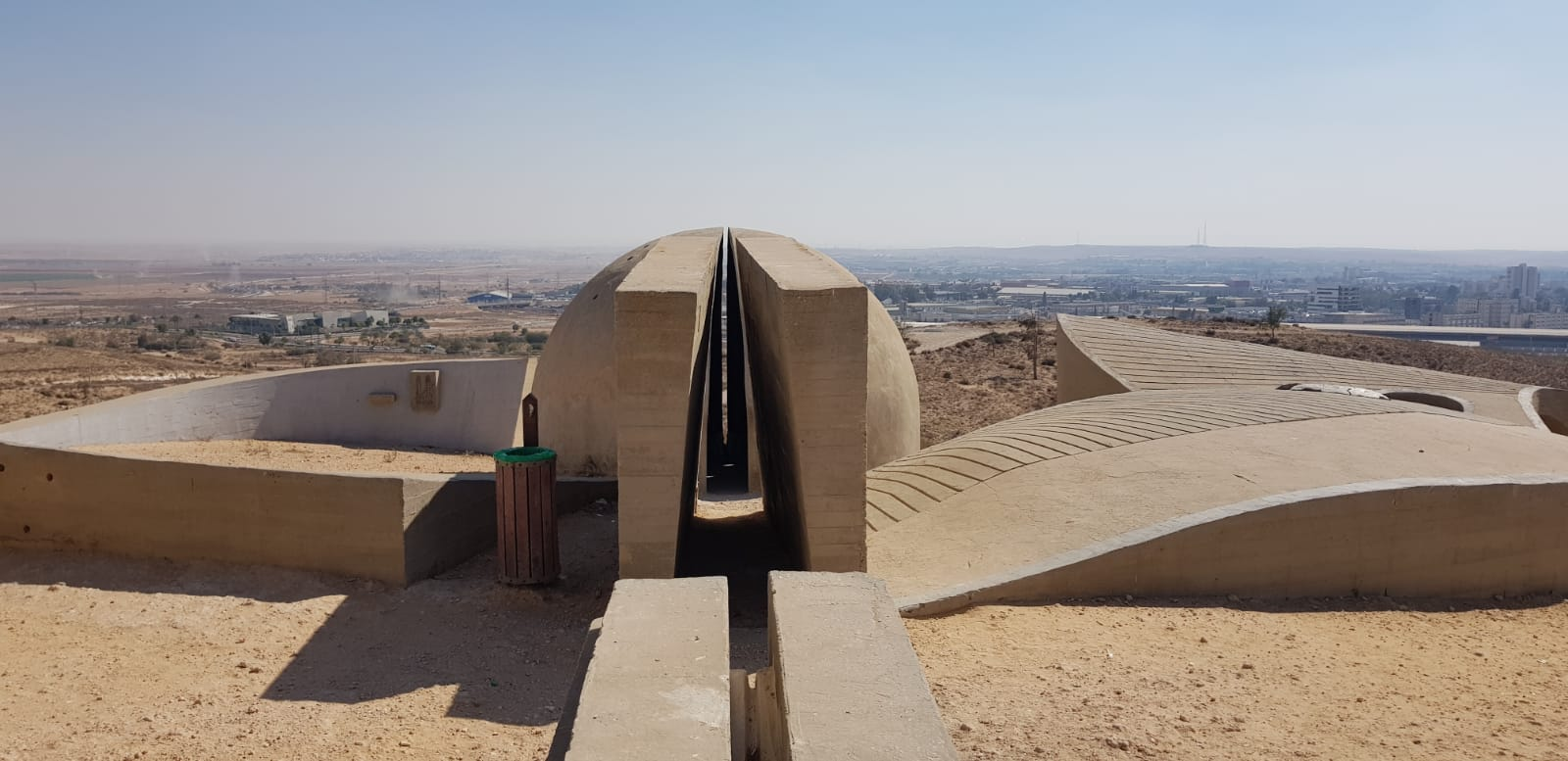
Negev Brigade Memorial

The Monument to the Negev Brigade (Hebrew: אנדרטת חטיבת הנגב, Andartat Hativat HaNegev), known locally as the Andarta, is a monument designed by Dani Karavan in memory of the members of the Palmach Negev Brigade who fell fighting on Israel's side during the 1948 Arab Israeli War. It is situated on a hill overlooking the city of Beersheba from the east and constitutes a recognized symbol of the Negev and Beersheba. In addition to its strengths as a memorial, it was a precursor to the land art movement.

The monument was built between 1963 and 1968 at a time when Israel was making many physical memorials to those who fought and died in its wars. It is made of raw concrete consisting of eighteen separate elements covering 10,000 square meters. These elements are symbolic and connected to Palmach and to the War of Independence.

The perforated tower alludes to a watchtower shelled with gunfire and the pipeline tunnel is reminiscent of the channel of water in the Negev defended by the soldiers. Engraved in the concrete are the names of the 324 soldiers who died in the war, the badge of the Palmach, diary passages from the soldiers, the battle registry, verses (from the Bible 2 Kings 2:12) and songs.

== See also ==
- Visual arts in Israel
