= Malcolm Bidali =

Kenyan labor rights activist

Malcolm Bidali is a labor rights activist from Kenya who focuses on conditions migrant workers are subjected to in Qatar. Bidali has written for the organization Migrant-Rights.org, where he has voiced concern about work and living conditions migrant workers face in Qatar and other nations. He was arrested by the Qatari authorities in 2021 for his writings and, upon his release, commented on the poor conditions of the prison system. He is the recipient of the 2023 Nuremberg International Human Rights Award for his human rights activism.
