= Ibn Abdur Rehman =

Pakistani activist (1930–2021)

I. A. Rehman
- Born: Ibn Abdur Rehman; 1 September 1930; Pataudi State, British India (present day Gurgaon District, Haryana, India)
- Died: 12 April 2021 (aged 90); Lahore, Pakistan
- Occupations: Journalist, Social and human rights activist
- Years active: 1950–2021
- Known for: Human rights activist
- Awards: Nuremberg International Human Rights Award in 2003; Ramon Magsaysay Award for Peace and International Understanding in 2004

Ibn Abdur Rehman, also known as I.A. Rehman (1 September 1930 – 12 April 2021) was a Pakistani peace and human rights advocate, a veteran communist and a journalist.

== Early life and education ==
Rehman was born on 1 September 1930 in Pataudi State, British India (present day Gurgaon district, Haryana, India). He grew up in both a "religious and secular" household, and his father and grandfather were landowners.

When partition of India happened in 1947, he was still studying at Aligarh Muslim University. He reportedly lost many relatives in the riots that followed the partition in his region of birth. He survived because he was away from the region as a student. Then he moved to Pakistan and was able to finish his MSc. degree in Physics from the University of the Punjab in Lahore, Pakistan.

== Career ==
I. A. Rehman first started writing columns for newspapers in 1950. A protégé of the great Urdu poet Faiz Ahmed Faiz, he became chief editor of the Pakistan Times newspaper in 1989. He continued to write columns for Dawn newspaper until almost his death. He was the founding chair of the Pakistan-India People's Forum for Peace and Democracy and a prominent human rights activist. Rehman was influential for promoting peace in the Indo-Pakistani wars and conflicts and in Kashmir conflict as well as for other human rights issues in Pakistan.

Rehman was also very active in the Pakistan Federal Union of Journalists (PFUJ). He was also a Director (1990-2008) and Secretary General from (2008-2016) at the Human Rights Commission of Pakistan.

A major newspaper of Pakistan is quoted as saying about I. A. Rehman:

"Had he chosen to concentrate on column-writing alone, he would have profited immensely because the big newspapers of India and Bangladeash were ready to publish him for any amount he desired, but instead he taught many generations of journalists about filing a report, doing research and journalistic ethics."

In November 2007, on a visit to India, he told The Hindu newspaper, "I've been working to defend people's human rights all my life. And, I will continue to do so."

In 2015, many human rights activists including I.A. Rehman urged the Pakistani government to 'criminalise child labour in hazardous environments'. According to Dawn, one activist doctor said, "I have seen cases where children have contracted tuberculosis because they worked in hazardous environments. Making children work such jobs should be criminalized."

== Death and legacy ==
He died on 12 April 2021 in Lahore, Pakistan at age 90.

On his death, a spokesperson for the Human Rights Commission of Pakistan (HRCP) reportedly called him a "titan of human rights....his integrity, conscience and compassion were unparalleled".

== Awards and recognition ==
- Ramon Magsaysay Award for Peace and International Understanding in 2004
- Nuremberg International Human Rights Award in 2003
