= Tom Taylor Stradivarius =

Antique violin

The Tom Taylor Stradivarius is an antique violin made by renowned luthier Antonio Stradivari in Cremona, Italy, circa 1732. Its namesake is British art critic Tom Taylor.

The first owner to be recorded was John Camidge, organist of York Minster. In 1837 it was acquired by the Reverend William Flower, the owner of several Stradivari instruments. Louis Spohr is said to have used the violin when he performed at the Norwich Festival in 1839. When he died, Flower's niece Jane Flower inherited the violin. She passed it on to her daughter, the violinist and composer Laura Wilson Taylor née Barker (1819–1905). Barker later married the British dramatist and art critic Tom Taylor, whose name was subsequently given to the violin.

When Laura Wilson Barker died in 1905 the instrument was inherited by her daughter, Laura Lucy Arnold Taylor (1863–1940), who sold it to Wilhelm Hermann Hammig of Berlin. By 1928 the violin was in America. Patricia Travers was the owner from 1938 to 1954. It was then sold to a benefactor who loaned it to California State University, Northridge.

The violin is best known for its use in the recording and appearance in the Canadian film The Red Violin (though the film actually tells the tale of the "Red Mendelssohn" Stradivarius, which has been owned by American violinist Elizabeth Pitcairn since 1990). The Tom Taylor was played by Joshua Bell, who later sold it for $2 million to pay for his current instrument: the Gibson Stradivarius.

The current owner is unknown.
