= Eduard Freudmann =

Austrian artist

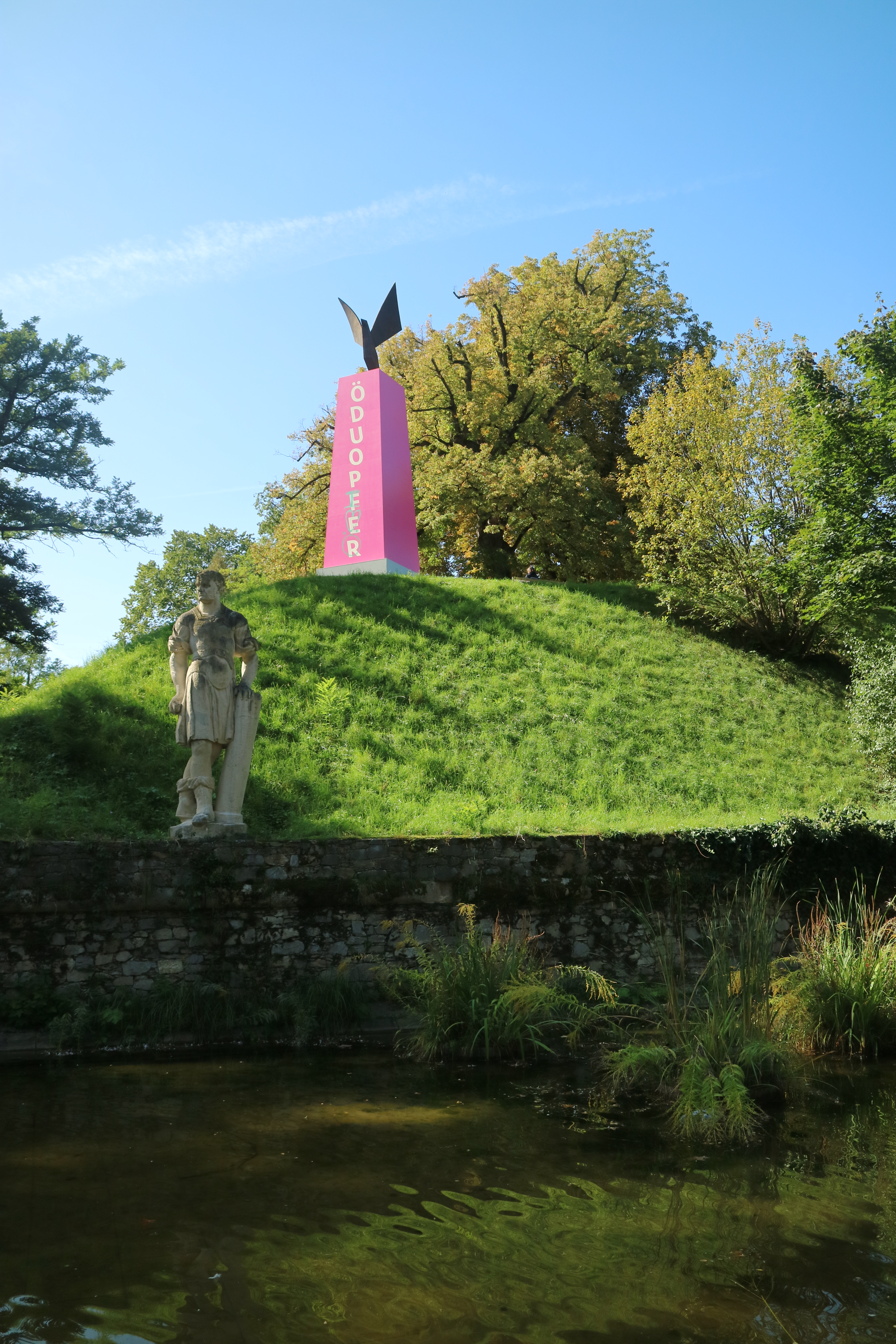
Monument to a Myth, Installation for the art festival Steirischer Herbst in September 2019 at the Burggarten in Graz.

Eduard Freudmann (born 1979 in Vienna) is an Austrian visual artist based in Vienna. He studied visual art at the Academy of Fine arts Vienna and at the Bauhaus University Weimar and is a researcher and teacher for Trans-disciplinary art at the Academy of Fine Arts Vienna. He is most known for his interventions in public space and projects dealing with the commemoration of the Holocaust. Together with the Austrian architect Gabu Heindl he won the controversial monument competition From Those You Saved in Warsaw.

== Major works ==
=== The White Elephant Archive ===
A performance project that explores the Holocaust from the perspective of the generation of Austrians living today. The performance was shown between 2012 and 2018 in different settings in Austria, Germany, and Poland, Israel, Hungary and the United States. The piece is performed in English, since many of the individuals it should speak to — descendants of Jews who escaped Vienna from National-socialism, living today in Britain, the United States and Israel — do not understand German. Matti Bunzl, the director of the Wien Museum, sees the White Elephant Archive performance as an "examination of history and memory in post-Holocaust Vienna," a "product of deep knowledge of Austria’s past" and Freudmann as "one of the most original artists working in Central Europe today."

=== The Monument May Be A Forest ===
A monument project Freudmann created in collaboration with the Austrian architect Gabu Heindl. It is the winner of the controversial monument competition From Those You Saved in Warsaw, to commemorate Polish righteous gentiles who saved Jews during the Holocaust. The plans to erect the monument next to the POLIN Museum, in the heart of the former Warsaw Ghetto, were harshly criticized by a significant number of Polish Jews. The president of the Jewish Community of Warsaw (pl) Anna Chipczyńska said she had regrets that they could not find an alternative site that would allow both the honouring of the Righteous Among the Nations as well as avoiding controversies and disagreements. Polish writer Bożena Keff expressed her view that the location of the monument was less about respecting history and more an act of propaganda. Freudmann and Heindl decided to include the controversies in their monument project and proposed to plant a forest nursery consisting of thousands of saplings next to the museum. After 1,5 years the saplings would be replanted as a forest at an urban location in Warsaw to be agreed upon by the protagonists of the conflict.

An international jury of 10 architects, artists, and curators chose The Monument May Be A Forest as winning proposal, because the project represented the commemoration of the processual aspect rather than just using imposing physical presence, it is based on "notions of care, commitment, fragility and risk" as well as the actual act of sheltering the Jews and has the potential to spread the commemoration across time and space." POLIN's deputy director Zygmunt Stępiński said it was a good opportunity for the museum, opening up space for an educational program that had the opportunity to spread across the country. He also considered it was more complex than just setting a monument in front of the museum. The architect of the POLIN Museum, Rainer Mahlamäki, one of the judges who voted for the trees, sees the winner of the competition as a new type of art and memorial as opposed to a monument. After the jury's decision had been published in April 2015, Sigmund Rolat, the founder the organization Remembrance and Future Foundation that run the project, denounced the design. In February 2016 Rolat invited the Israeli sculptor Dani Karavan to take on the project but he declined after he had read an article written by Freudmann and Heindl, in which they criticize the foundation and their course of action. In April 2016 Karavan announced that he accepted the commission to build the monument, thereby sparking another furor. To this day the monument for the Polish righteous gentiles has not been built.

=== Unearthing A Nazi Poet ===
A collaborative project and artistic intervention in public space carried out by the collective Plattform Geschichtspolitik (Platform History-Politics). The group of students, teachers and activists at the Academy of Fine Arts Vienna was formed during the 2009 education protests in Vienna to critically deal with the institution's entanglement in colonialism, Austro-Fascism and Nazism. The group's artistic intervention aimed at drawing public attention to the monument to Josef Weinheber, an Austrian poet and Nazi functionary. Weinheber wrote numerous Nazi propaganda poems, got appointed an honorary member of the Academy of Fine Arts Vienna during Nazism and was listed on Adolf Hitler's Gottbegnadeten list. The monument is standing in Vienna's centrally located Schiller Park, next to monuments for the poets Friedrich Schiller, Franz Werfel, Nikolaus Lenau and Anastasius Grün.

Weinheber's monument was erected in 1975 to commemorate the 30th anniversary of the poet's death. He had committed suicide by taking an overdose of morphine at the time of the advance march of the Red Army. The monument consisted of a sandstone plinth with a bronze bust of the poet, created in 1940 by Josef Bock, a Viennese sculptor who had also made portraits of Adolf Hitler. The monument repeatedly got vandalized and marked with anti-Fascist slogans. The bust got stolen twice and had to be re-cast by the cultural department of the City of Vienna, who has been in charge of maintaining the monument. Reacting to the anti-Fascist interventions the city administration decided in 1991 to reconfigure the monument by fortifying it. The sandstone plinth was substituted with polished marble because it was easier to clean. In order to anchor the monument to the ground and provide stability the plinth was mounted in a large underground concrete foundation.

In 2010 the Plattform Geschichtspolitik group created a paper wrapping for the Weinheber monument, saying “A monument honoring a Nazi belittles Nazism and the Shoah”. The wrapping remained in place for several weeks and resulted in a series of negotiations with the city's department for public art to artistically reconfigure the monument. The group's proposal to excavate the monument's underground foundation was supported by a number of prominent supporters such as Austria's winner of the Nobel Prize in Literature Elfriede Jelinek, authors Josef Haslinger, Julya Rabinovich, Doron Rabinovici, Robert Schindel and Marlene Streeruwitz, and art theorists Sabeth Buchmann and Diedrich Diederichsen. In 2013 the city administration eventually declined the group's proposal. On Friday, June 28, 2013, the group decided to carry out a temporary artistic intervention at the monument without official authorization and excavated the foundation which they considered an essential element of the monument. The intervention aimed at “sparking a debate about how to proceed with the contextualization and artistic reconfiguration of [the] Nazi monument”. The excavation remained intact over the weekend, on Monday morning it was undone by the city's gardening department.

The intervention had sparked a public debate on how to deal with monuments dedicated to problematic historical figures, manifesting in a number of media articles and statements by politicians and intellectuals. The Austrian writer Josef Haslinger stated that he considers the small wound created by the artists in the turf of Schiller Park as a metaphor for the large wound Nazism had left in the country's intellectual history and he blamed the city administration of covering up history by reversing the intervention instead of facing up to the debate. Vienna's City Councilor for Culture and Science, Andreas Mailath-Pokorny, of the Austrian Social-Democratic Party, claimed that he appreciated the group's effort and the foundation could have remained excavated for a while if parks and garden division colleagues hadn't beat him to the punch. He also proposed that the monument should be reconfigured and re-contextualized and encouraged the artist group to re-submit their proposal to the city's department for public art. Klaus Werner-Lobo of the Austrian Green Party endorsed the artistic intervention and stated his support for the City Councilor's endeavor to reconfigure the monument, while Christian Ebinger of the Austrian Freedom Party criticized the intervention's iconoclast character, suggesting that such actions would lead to an erasement of history. The “Weinheber Society”, the formal owner of the monument, announced that it would remove the monument from public space in case the city administration would decide to reconfigure it. Plattform Geschichtspolitik's re-submitted proposal for the artistic reconfiguration was approved by the city's department for public art but the granted funding was too low to realize the endeavor and the monument remained unchanged.

Maia Nichols of the Droste Effect Magazine claims that by failing to facilitate the reconfiguration of the monument the city government “evades owning up to capture an awareness of their position and role in mitigating and extending the history of Nazism and the various stances towards fascism of their people”. Curator Sarah Mendelsohn points out, that the slow negotiations with the city authorities and the continual discourse on the reconfiguration can be seen as a “bigger project” leading to the understanding that “monuments and memorials provide stages that can be acted on, and that can be altered”. In 2017 the video work "Poeta Laureatus!", consisting of the intervention's documentation, was produced by Chris Gangl, Eduard Freudmann and Tatiana Kai-Browne of Plattform Geschichtspolitik and first exhibited at the 11th Kaunas Biennial. In the video they claim that the negotiations with the city administration are still ongoing. although,
