= Tamara Chikunova =

Uzbekistani activist (1948–2021)

Tamara Ivanovna Chikunova, nee Petrova, Тамара Ивановна Чикунова (1948 – 31 March 2021) was an Uzbek human rights defender, campaigner against the death penalty and torture, and the founder of "Mothers Against Death Sentence and Torture."

Born in Tashkent, Chikunova began her campaigning after her son Dmitry was arrested in 1999 and executed in July 2000 and she worked against the death penalty, which Uzbekistan abolished in 2008. She won the Colombe d'Oro and the 2005 Nuremberg International Human Rights Award.

Finally the state of Uzbekistan adopted United Nations civil rights pact and abolished the death penalty.

Chikunova later moved to Italy, from where she campaigned across Europe, particularly against the continuing use of the death penalty in Belarus, the only European state that still conducts executions.

She died on 31 March 2021 in the Italian town of Novara, where she lived in a Sant'Egidio community.
