= Nicholas Maw: Violin Concerto =

Studio album by Joshua Bell
- Released: 1999
- Genre: Classical
- Length: 41:46
- Label: Sony Classical

Nicholas Maw: Violin Concerto is an album by Joshua Bell accompanied by the London Philharmonic Orchestra of a composition written by British composer Nicholas Maw. The album was nominated for the 2000 Mercury Prize.
