= Gibson Stradivarius =

Antique violin

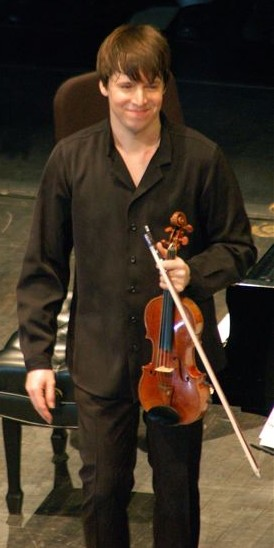
Joshua Bell with the Gibson Stradivarius in 2008

The Gibson ex-Huberman Stradivarius of 1713 is an antique violin made by Antonio Stradivari of Cremona. The Gibson, while owned by Bronisław Huberman, was stolen twice. The first time it was returned shortly afterwards. The second theft, possibly by musician Julian Altman, occurred on the evening of 28 February 1936, backstage at Carnegie Hall, while Huberman performed with his Guarnerius of 1731.

Though Huberman never saw the Gibson again, it was recovered 50 years later, in 1985, as a result of Altman's deathbed confession to his wife that he had bought the stolen violin from a friend for $100. In 1988 she turned it in to Lloyd's, which paid her a $263,000 finder's fee and then sold it for $1.2 million to Norbert Brainin, an acclaimed English violinist.

It is currently owned by violinist Joshua Bell. Bell had played the violin, and Brainin jokingly told him it could be his for four million dollars. Shortly thereafter, by chance, Bell came across the violin again and discovered it was about to be sold to a German industrialist to become part of a collection. According to his website, Bell "was practically in tears."

Bell sold his then current Stradivarius, the Tom Taylor, for a little more than two million dollars and purchased the Gibson ex-Huberman for a little under the four million dollar asking price. His first recording with it was Romance of the Violin (on Sony Classical) in 2003.

In 2019, the instrument's value increased to an estimated $14 million.
