= Dani Karavan =

Israeli sculptor (1930–2021)

- דני קרוון
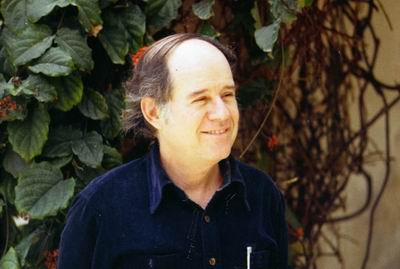
- Dani Karavan (1979)
- Born: Daniel Karavan; 7 December 1930; Tel Aviv, Mandatory Palestine
- Died: 29 May 2021 (aged 90); Tel Aviv-Yafo, Israel
- Education: 1943-1944, Under Aharon Avni at Avni Institute; 1945-1948 under Marcel Janco, Avigdor Stematsky, Yechezkel Streichman; 1949 Bezalel Academy of Art; 1956-1957, Accademia di Belle Arti di Firenze, Florence; Académie de la Grande Chaumière, Paris
- Known for: sculpture
- Movement: International style
- Awards: Israel Prize for sculpture Praemium Imperiale of Japan

Daniel "Dani" Karavan (Hebrew: דניאל "דני" קרוון; 7 December 1930 – 29 May 2021) was an Israeli sculptor best known for site specific memorials and monuments which merge into the environment.

== Biography ==
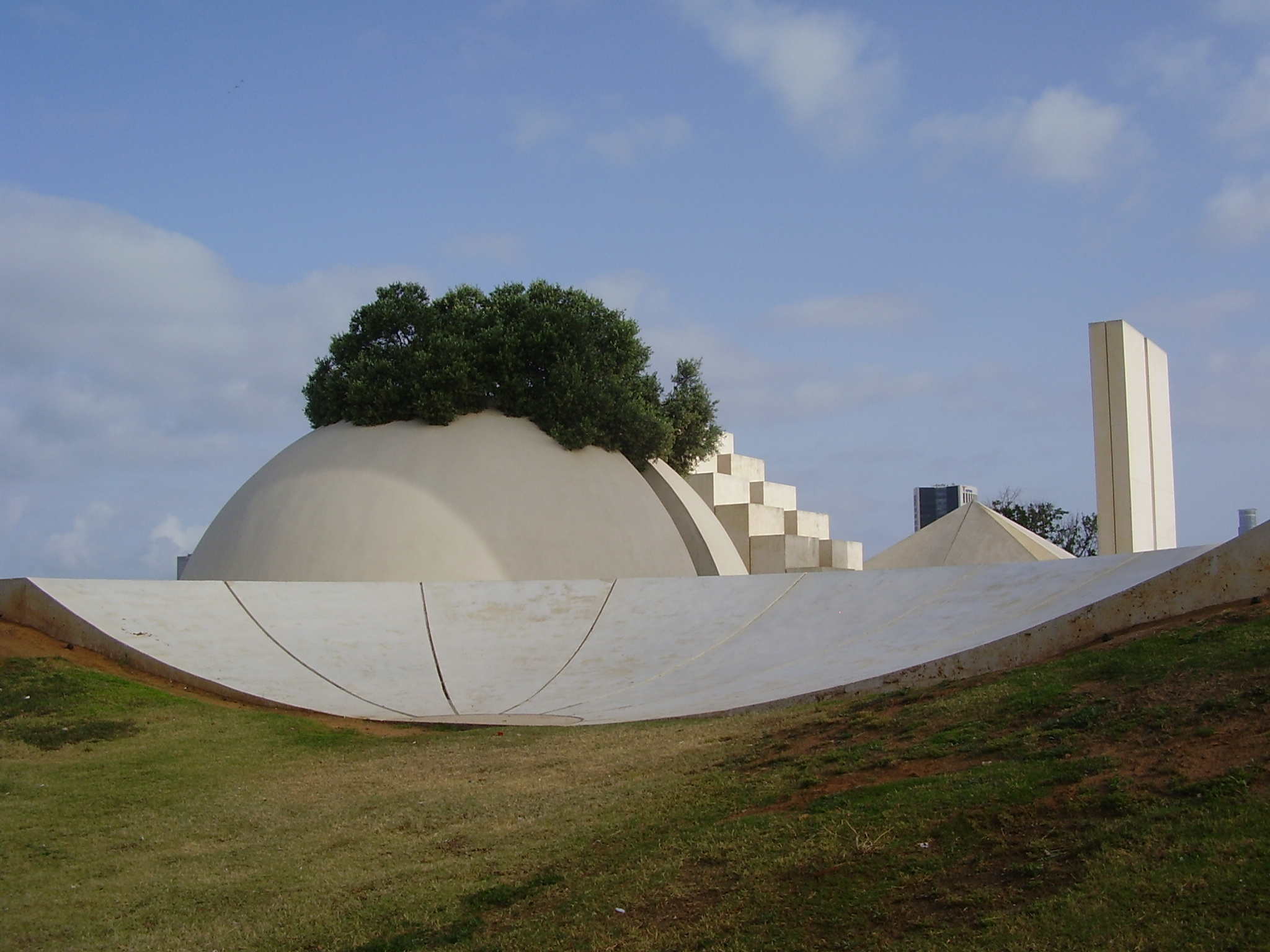
White Square ('Kikar Levana'), Edith Wolfson Park, Givatayim

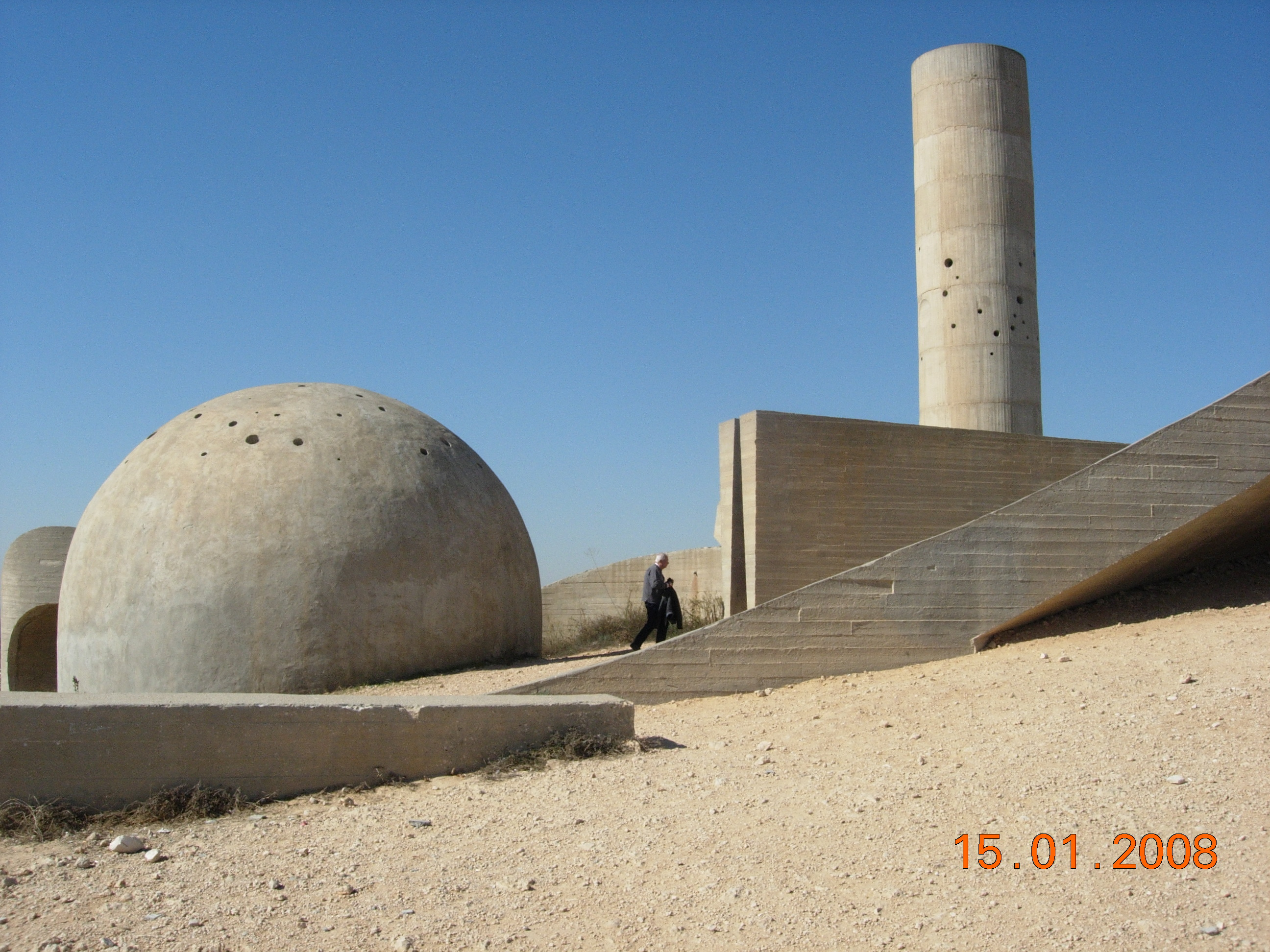
Monument to the Negev Brigade, Beersheva

Daniel (Dani) Karavan was born in Tel Aviv. His father Abraham, was the chief landscape architect of Tel Aviv from the 1940s to the 1960s.

He attended Tichon Hadash high school in Tel Aviv. At the age of 13, he began studying painting. From 1943 to 1944 he studied art under Aharon Avni, at the Avni Institute. From 1945 to 1948 he studied with Marcel Janco, Avigdor Stematsky and Yechezkel Streichman in Tel Aviv. In 1949 at the Bezalel School of Art in Jerusalem. After living on a kibbutz from 1948 to 1955, he returned to art. From 1956 to 1957, he studied fresco technique at the Accademia delle Belle Arti in Florence and drawing at the Académie de la Grande Chaumière in Paris.

In his 20s, Karavan moved to Kibbutz Harel, where he met his wife, Hava Fogler. The two married in 1955 and had three daughters: Noa - a producer, married to the illustrator Yizhar Cohen, Tamar - a fashion photographer, and Yael - a theater actress, based in Portugal.

Karavan lived and worked in Tel Aviv (on Zvi Herman Shapira Street near the "Avraham Karavan Garden"), in Paris, and in Florence.

Karavan died on 29 May 2021, at the age of 90. He is buried in the cemetery of Kibbutz Shoval.

== Art career ==
Karavan made permanent installations in the form of wall reliefs in Israeli courts and research institutions. Examples of his artwork for courts are the 1966 Jerusalem City of Peace wall relief in the Knesset assembly hall and the environmental sculptures comprising 35 wall reliefs and iron sculpture made between 1962 and 1967 at the Court of Justice in Tel Aviv. For the Weizmann Institute of Science he made the From the Tree of Knowledge to the Tree of Life wall relief in 1964 and the Memorial to the Holocaust in 1972.

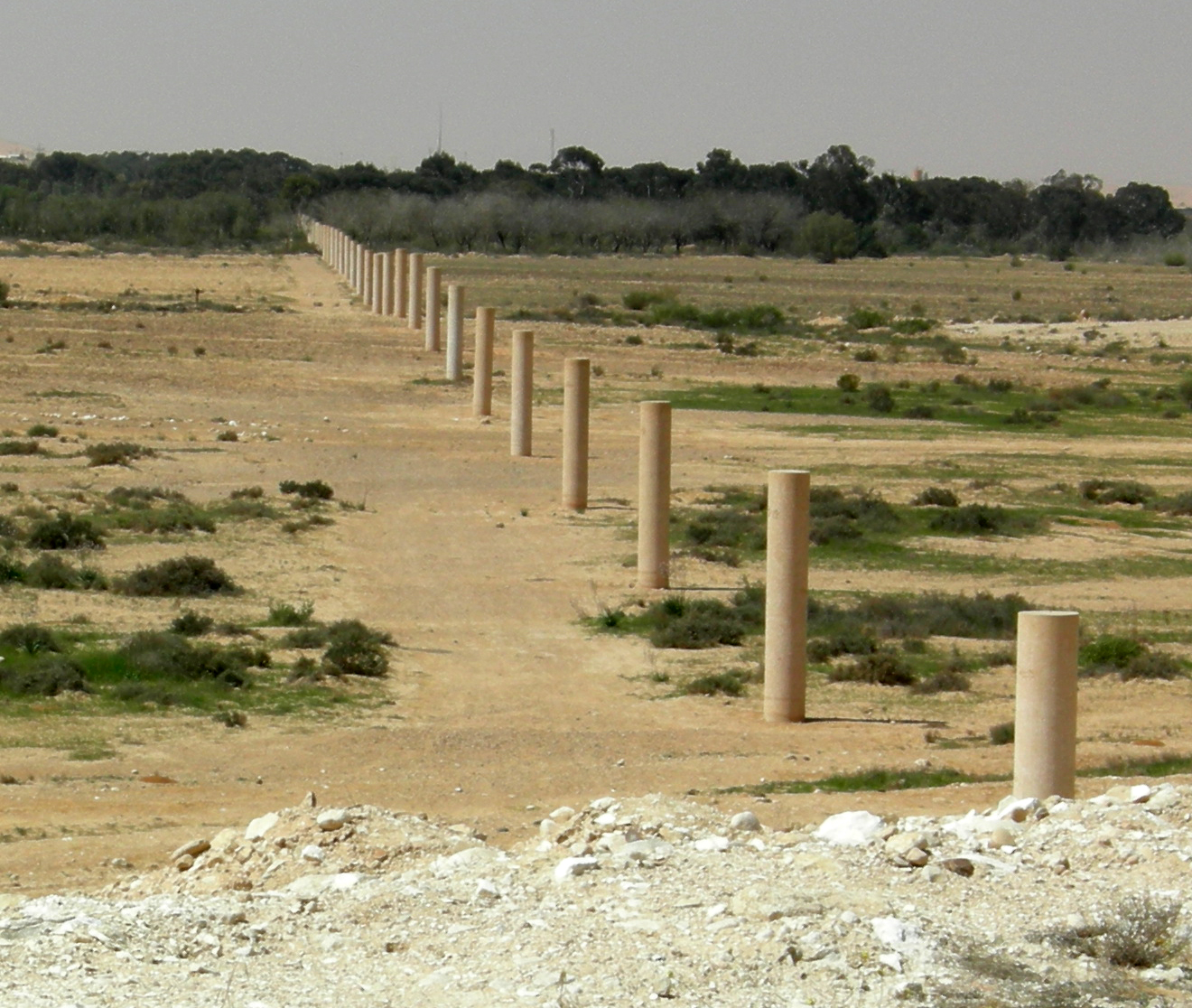
"Way of Peace" constructed 1996–2000 between Israel and Egypt

For performance groups he designed stage sets throughout the 1960s and 1970s. These included the Martha Graham Dance Company, the Batsheva Dance Company, and the Israel Chamber Orchestra among others. After representing Israel with his Jerusalem City of Peace sculpture at the 1976 Venice Biennale, he obtained more international commissions – including sculptures in France, Germany, Japan, South Korea, Spain, and Switzerland. One such project was a memorial entitled Passages for Walter Benjamin constructed between 1990 and 1994 in Portbou at the Spanish-French border in Catalonia where Walter Benjamin died in September 1940.

Karavan's advocacy of Tel Aviv's modern international style buildings encouraged their restoration and the inscription of The White City as a UNESCO World Heritage Site. Along with an exhibition about the city's architecture at the Tel Aviv Museum of Art in the mid-1980s, Karavan convinced mayor Shlomo Lahat to form a jury of international architecture and art critics to review these buildings. The value they placed on the city's town planning and design led to conservation in the 1990s and acceptance by UNESCO in 2003.

In February 2016 Karavan was commissioned by Sigmund Rolat, the founder of the organization Remembrance and Future Foundation, to design the controversial monument From Those You Saved in Warsaw to commemorate Polish righteous gentiles who saved Jews during the Holocaust. Prior to commissioning Karavan, Rolat had denounced the design by Austrian architect Gabu Heindl and artist Eduard Freudmann which had won the preceding controversial monument competition. Karavan initially declined the commission after he had read an article written by Freudmann and Heindl, in which they criticized the foundation and their course of action. In April 2016 Karavan announced that he accepted the commission to build the monument, thereby sparking another furor. To this day, the monument for Polish righteous gentiles has not been built.

== Awards ==
- In 1977, Karavan was awarded the Israel Prize, for sculpture.
- In 1998, he was one of five recipients of the Japanese annual Praemium Imperiale art prize.
- In 2009 he was awarded the degree of Doctor honoris causa from Ben-Gurion University of the Negev.

== List of projects ==
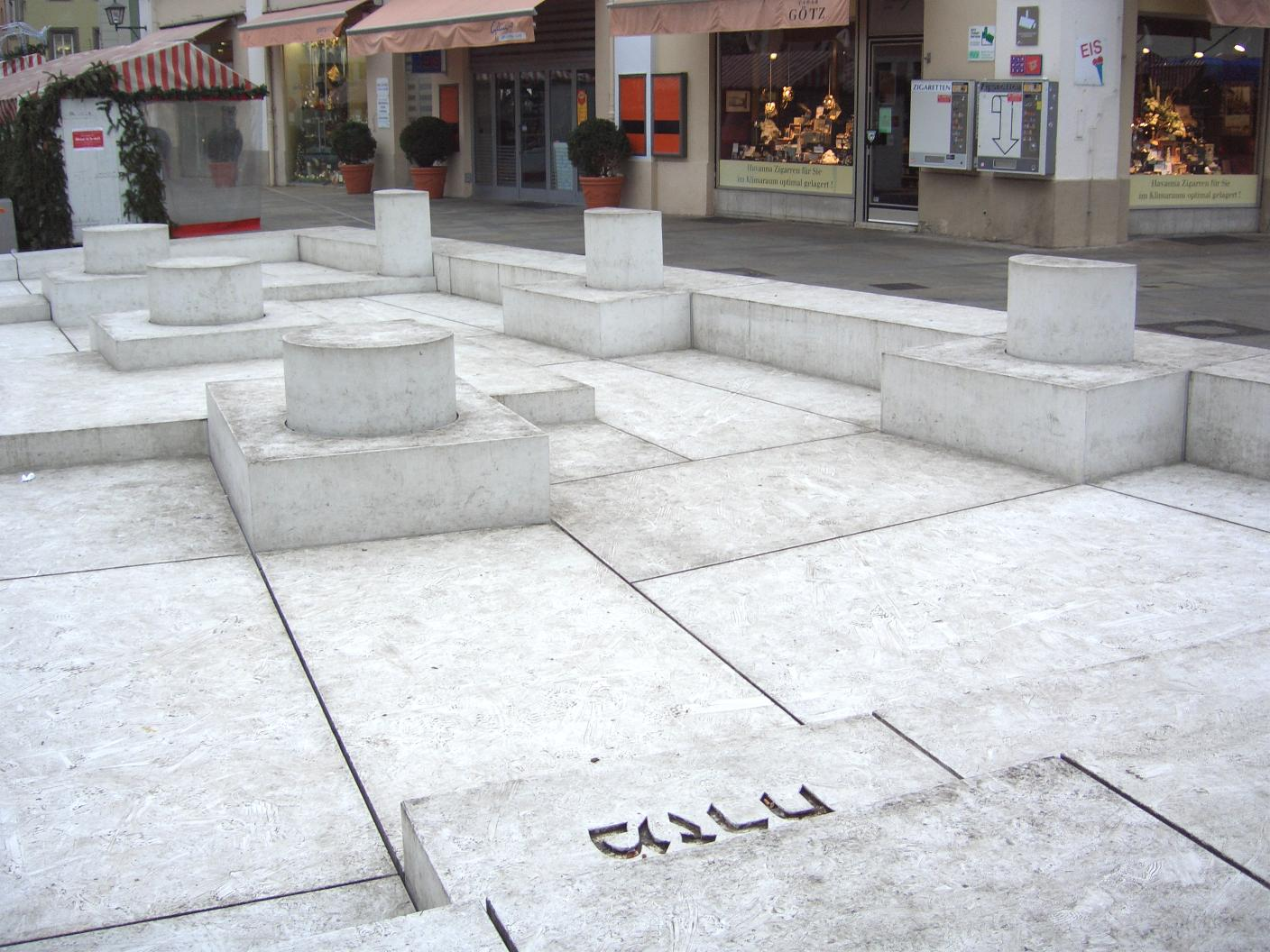
A memorial created by Dani Karavan in 2005, depicting the foundation of the Regensburg Synagogue that was destroyed during a pogrom in 1519. The inscription 'מזרח' in Hebrew is 'east' in English.

- Monument to the Negev Brigade (1963–1968, Negev, Beersheva)
- Memorial to the Holocaust, 1972, Weizmann Institute of Science, Rehovot, Israel.
- Kikar Levana (Hebrew for The White Plaza; 1977–1988, Tel Aviv, Israel)
- Tower of Tears (memorial installation at Yad La-Shiryon, Latrun, Israel)
- Axis of the Metropolis (Axe majeur) (1980–, Cergy, France)
- Line 1-2-3+4+5, Fattoria di Celle- Collezione Gori, 1982 Italy
- Tzaphon (iron sculpture in the form of a disc for the entrance square of the Landtag of North Rhine-Westphalia, Düsseldorf, Germany, 1990)
- The Way of Human Rights (1989–1993, Germanisches Nationalmuseum, Nuremberg, Germany)
- Passage, a Homage to Walter Benjamin (1990–1994, Portbou, Catalonia, Spain)
- Way to the Hidden Garden (1992–1999, Sapporo Art Forest open-air gallery, Japan)
- Ma'ayan (1993–95, Miyazaki Prefecture Art Museum, Japan)
- Way of Peace (1996–2000, Negev Desert near Nitzana, Israel)
- Murou Art Forest (1998–2006, Nara Prefecture, Japan)
- Garden of Remembrance (1999, Duisburg Inner Harbour, Germany)
- The tea ceremony, Fattoria di Celle- Collezione Gori, 1999 Italy
- Bereshit (Hebrew: Genesis; 2000–, Kirishima Art Forest, Kagoshima Prefecture, Japan)
- Regensburg Synagogue memorial, 2005
- Time (2009, Calenzano, Italy)
- Memorial to the Sinti and Roma victims of National Socialism (2012, Berlin, Germany)

== See also ==
- List of Israel Prize recipients
- Visual arts in Israel
