= Joshua Bell =

American violinist and conductor

Joshua Bell CBE
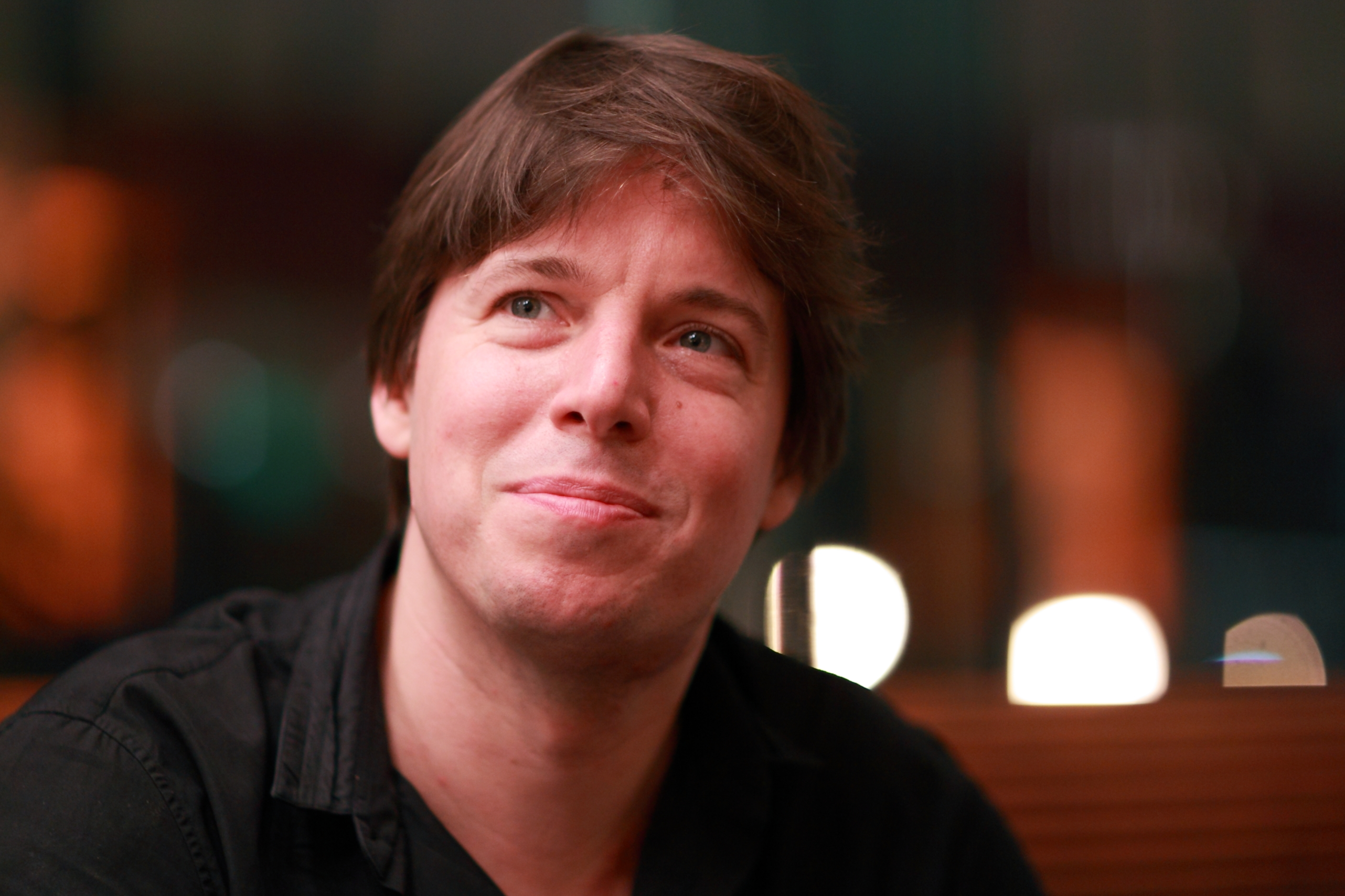
- Bell in 2010

Background information
- Born: December 9, 1967 (age 58); Bloomington, Indiana, US
- Genre: Classical
- Occupations: Violinist, conductor
- Years active: 1982–present
- Website: joshuabell.com

Joshua David Bell (born December 9, 1967) is an American violinist and conductor. He is the music director of the Academy of St Martin in the Fields.

== Early life and education ==
Bell was born in Bloomington, Indiana, one of four children of Shirley Bell, a therapist, and Alan P. Bell, a psychologist and professor at Indiana University (IU), and former Kinsey researcher. His father was of Scottish descent and his mother was Jewish (her father was born in Mandatory Palestine, now modern-day Israel, and her mother was from Minsk).

Bell began playing the violin at age four after his mother discovered that he had taken rubber bands from around the house and stretched them across the handles of his nine dresser drawers to pluck out music he had heard her play on the piano. His parents got a scaled-to-size violin for him when he was five and started giving him lessons. Bell took to the instrument but had an otherwise normal Indiana childhood, playing video games and excelling at sports, especially tennis and bowling. He placed in a national tennis tournament at age ten.

Bell's first violin teacher was Donna Bricht, widow of Indiana University music faculty member Walter Bricht. His second was Mimi Zweig, and his third the violinist and pedagogue Josef Gingold, who accepted Bell as a student after his parents assured him that they were not interested in pushing their son to be a star but simply wanted him to have the best teacher for his abilities. By age 12, Bell was serious about the instrument, thanks in large part to Gingold's inspiration.

At age 14, Bell appeared as a soloist with the Philadelphia Orchestra under Riccardo Muti. He studied violin at the Indiana University Jacobs School of Music and graduated from Bloomington High School North in 1984. In 1989 Bell received an Artist Diploma in violin performance from Indiana University. IU also honored him with a Distinguished Alumni Service Award two years after his graduation. He has been named an "Indiana Living Legend" and received the Indiana Governor's Arts Award.

== Career ==
Piano Trio No. 1, 4. Finale (8:08)
Bell, Awadagin Pratt, and Alisa Weilerstein perform Mendelssohn's Piano Trio No. 1 at the White House Evening of Classical Music on November 4, 2009.

Piano Trio No. 1, Finale
Audio only version

Bell made his Carnegie Hall debut in 1985, at age 17, with the St. Louis Symphony. In 1990, at age 22, he went on the American Russian Young Artists Orchestra's first tour of Russia. He has since performed with many of the world's major orchestras and conductors. As well as the standard concerto repertoire, he has performed new works. Nicholas Maw's violin concerto is dedicated to Bell, who premiered it in 1993 and won a Grammy Award for his recording. He performed the solo part on John Corigliano's Oscar-winning soundtrack to the film The Red Violin and was featured in Ladies in Lavender. He also appeared in the movie Music of the Heart, with other violinists.

Bell's instrument is the Gibson ex Huberman, a Stradivarius made in 1713 during what is known as Stradivari's "Golden Era". The violin was stolen twice from its previous owner, Bronisław Huberman; the final time, the thief confessed to the act on his deathbed. Bell had played the violin; its owner at the time, violinist Norbert Brainin, jokingly told him that it could be his for $4 million. On August 3, 2001, Bell was in London to perform at The Proms; before the concert he was approached by J & A Beare. He learned that the violin was in London and about to be sold to a German industrialist to become part of a collection. Bell played the violin at the Proms that same evening. He later sold his previous violin, the Tom Taylor Stradivarius, for a little more than $2 million and bought the Gibson ex Huberman for a little under the $4 million asking price. The 2013 documentary The Return of the Violin tells the story of the instrument's theft, return, and subsequent acquisition by Bell. Bell's first recording with the Gibson ex Huberman was Romance of the Violin for Sony Classical Records in 2003.

Bell served as artistic partner for the Saint Paul Chamber Orchestra from 2004 until 2007, and as a visiting professor at the Royal Academy of Music in London. He also serves on the artists' selection committee for the Kennedy Center Honors and is an adjunct associate professor at the Massachusetts Institute of Technology.

Bell won the Avery Fisher Prize on April 10, 2007, at Lincoln Center in New York City. The prize is given once every few years to classical instrumentalists for outstanding achievement. On May 3, 2007, Indiana University's Jacobs School of Music announced that Bell had joined the faculty as a senior lecturer.

In 2008, Bell received the Golden Plate Award of the American Academy of Achievement.

Bell collaborated with Hans Zimmer by providing violin solos for the soundtrack of the 2009 film Angels & Demons, based on Dan Brown's 2000 novel of the same name.

In May 2011, the Academy of St Martin in the Fields (ASMF) named Bell its music director. He has recorded commercially with the ASMF for the Sony Classical label. In July 2017, the ASMF announced a three-year extension of his contract, through 2020. Bell and the orchestra won the 2017 Helpmann Award for Best Individual Classical Music Performance. In April 2024, the ASMF announced an additional extension of Bell's contract as its music director through August 2028.

In 2013, Bell accompanied Scarlett Johansson in the song "Before My Time". Written by J. Ralph for the documentary Chasing Ice, it received a nomination for the Academy Award for Best Original Song.

Bell played himself in three episodes of Mozart in the Jungle in 2014, 2015, and 2016. In 2016, he had a cameo in the penultimate musical episode of Royal Pains. He also appeared as himself in episode 8 ("Quacktice Makes Perfect") of the 2017 Netflix original series Julie's Greenroom.

In October 2024, the New Jersey Symphony announced the appointment of Bell as its new principal guest conductor, effective with the 2025–2026 season, with an initial contract of four seasons.

Bell is represented by Charlotte Lee at Primo Artists.

On October 14, 2025, Bell was appointed as an honorary Commander of the Order of the British Empire by Charles III.

== Washington Post experiment ==
In an experiment initiated by The Washington Post columnist Gene Weingarten, Bell donned a baseball cap and played as an incognito busker at the Metro subway station L'Enfant Plaza in Washington, D.C., on January 12, 2007. The experiment was videotaped on hidden camera; of the 1,097 people who passed by, seven stopped to listen to him and one recognized him. For his nearly 45-minute performance, Bell collected $32.17 from 27 passersby (excluding $20 from the one who recognized him). Three days earlier, he earned considerably more playing the same repertoire at a concert. Weingarten won the 2008 Pulitzer Prize for Feature Writing for his article on the experiment. The Washington Post posted the video on YouTube and a feature-length documentary, Find Your Way: A Busker's Documentary, chronicled Bell's experience. A somewhat inaccurate retelling of the story went viral.

== Personal life ==
Bell and his former partner, Lisa Matricardi, have three sons: Josef (born 2007), and twins Benjamin and Samuel (born 2010). On October 5, 2019, Bell married opera singer Larisa Martinez at their home in Mount Kisco, New York. They were married by columnist David Brooks. Bell and Martinez met when she was reading The Fabric of the Cosmos by Brian Greene, who is a friend of Bell's.

== Selected discography ==
Year	Album	Billboard Classical	Billboard 200
1988	Bruch & Mendelssohn Violin Concertos, London Records	—	—
1989	Fauré / Debussy / Franck Violin Sonatas with Jean-Yves Thibaudet, Decca Records	—	—
1989	Saint-Saëns: Violin concerto N°3, Lalo, Symphonie Espagnole		
1990	Presenting Joshua Bell, Polygram Records	—	—
1991	Chausson Concerto, Ravel Piano Trio, London Records	—	—
1992	Saint-Saëns: Violin Concerto No. 3 / Chausson: Poeme, London Records	—	—
1995	Prokofiev: Violin Concertos & Sonatas, London Records	—	—
1995	Brahms / Schumann Violin Concertos, London Records	—	—
1996	The Kreisler Album, London Records	—	—
1997	Barber / Walton/ Bloch Violin Concertos, Decca Records	—	—
1997	Shostakovich Piano Trio No. 2, London Records	—	—
1999	Maw Violin Concertos, Sony Classical	—	—
1999	Gershwin Fantasy, Sony Classical	—	—
2000	Sibelius & Goldmark: Violin Concertos, Sony Classical	—	—
2000	Short Trip Home, with Edgar Meyer, Sam Bush, Mike Marshall, Sony Classical	7	—
2001	Bernstein West Side Story Suite, Sony Classical	3	—
2002	Beethoven & Mendelssohn: Violin Concertos, Sony Classical	18	—
2004	Romance of the Violin, Sony Classical	1	176
2005	Tchaikovsky: Violin Concerto, Op. 35; Melodie; Danse Russe from Swan Lake (Act III), Sony Classical	2	—
2005	OST Duft von Lavendel, Sony Classical		
2005	Romance of the Violin, Sony Classical		
2006	Voice of the Violin, Sony Classical	1	—
2007	Corigliano The Red Violin, Sony	1	—
2007	The Essential Joshua Bell, Sony BMG Masterworks	19	—
2008	Vivaldi: The Four Seasons, Sony BMG Masterworks	1	134
2009	Bruch, Mendelssohn, Mozart Violin Concertos (reissues), Decca	9	—
2009	The Best of Joshua Bell, Sony Masterworks	12	—
2009	At Home with Friends, Sony Masterworks with Chris Botti, Kristin Chenoweth, Regina Spektor, Anoushka Shankar, Frankie Moreno, and Sting	1	118
2012	French Impressions, Sony Classical	1	139
2013	Beethoven: Symphonies Nos.4 &7, Academy of St Martin in the Fields, Sony Masterworks	1	—
2013	Musical Gifts from Joshua Bell and Friends, Sony Classical		
2014	Bach, Academy of St Martin in the Fields, Sony Classical	—	—
2016	For the Love of Brahms, Academy of St Martin in the Fields, Classical	—	—
2017	Joshua Bell – The Classical Collection, Sony Classical		
2017	Brigitte Klassik zum Genießen: Joshua Bell, Sony Classical		
2018	Bruch: Scottish Fantasy, Op. 46 / Violin Concerto No. 1 in G Minor, Op. 26, Sony Classical		
2020	At Home With Music		

=== Soundtrack albums ===
- Chasing Ice Original Motion Picture Soundtrack (2012)
- The Flowers of War Original Motion Picture Soundtrack (2012) – Joshua Bell, solo violin
- Angels & Demons Original Motion Picture Soundtrack (2009)
- Defiance Original Motion Picture Soundtrack (2008)
- Ladies in Lavender Original Motion Picture Soundtrack (2005) – Joshua Bell, solo violin
- Iris Original Motion Picture Soundtrack (2001) – Joshua Bell, solo violin
- The Red Violin Original Motion Picture Soundtrack (1999) – Joshua Bell, violin solos on soundtrack

Cultural offices
Preceded by Sir Neville Marriner	Music Director, Academy of St Martin in the Fields; 2011–present	Succeeded by incumbent
