= Israeli security forces =

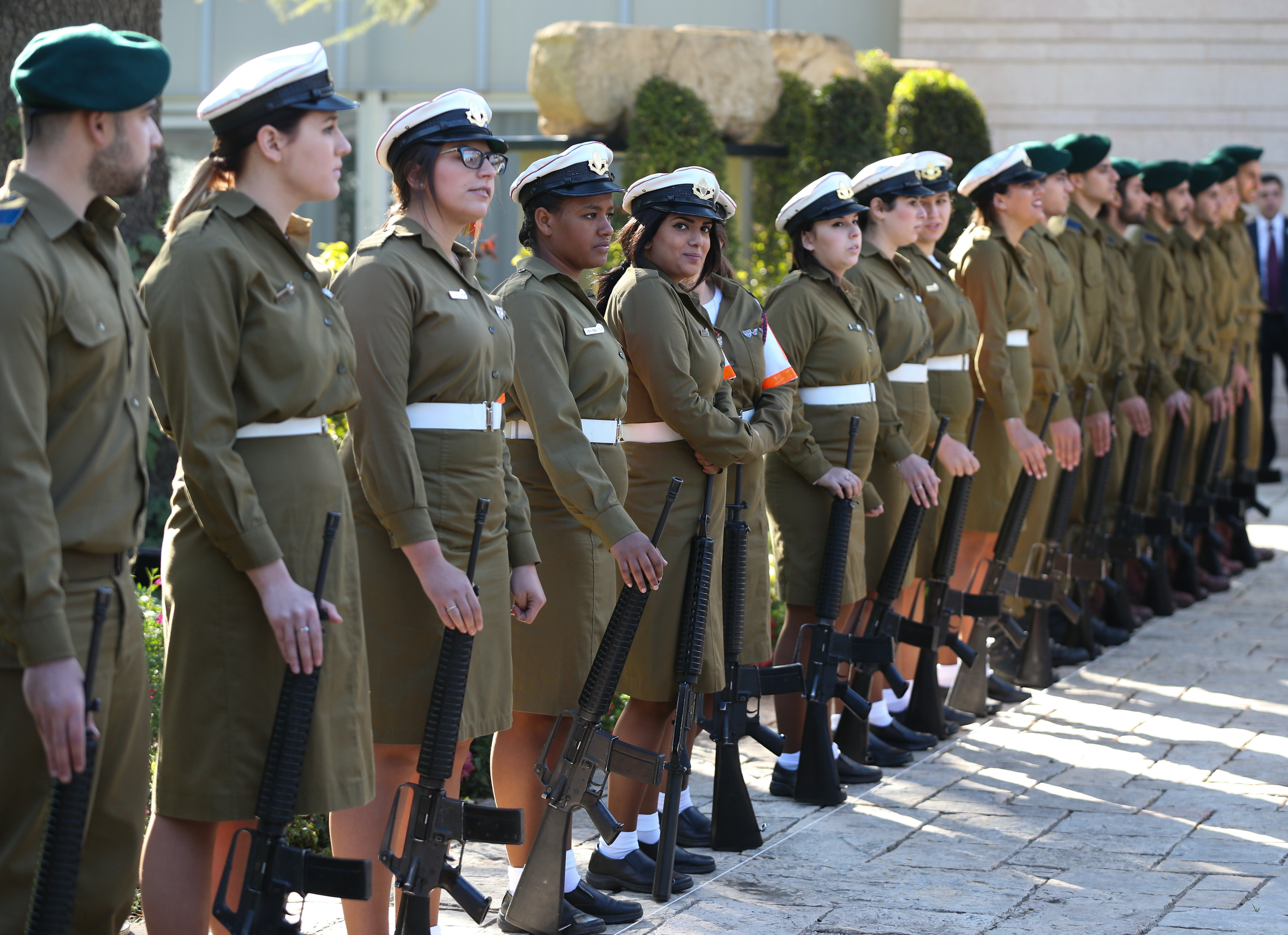
Israeli honor guards standing at attention.

Israeli security forces (also known as Israel security establishment; Hebrew: מערכת הבטחון, romanized: Ma'arechet haBitachon) include a variety of organizations, including military, law enforcement, paramilitary, governmental, and intelligence agencies.

== Military ==
- Israel Defense Forces (IDF): Israel's military, comprising the Ground Forces, Air Force and Navy.

== Police ==
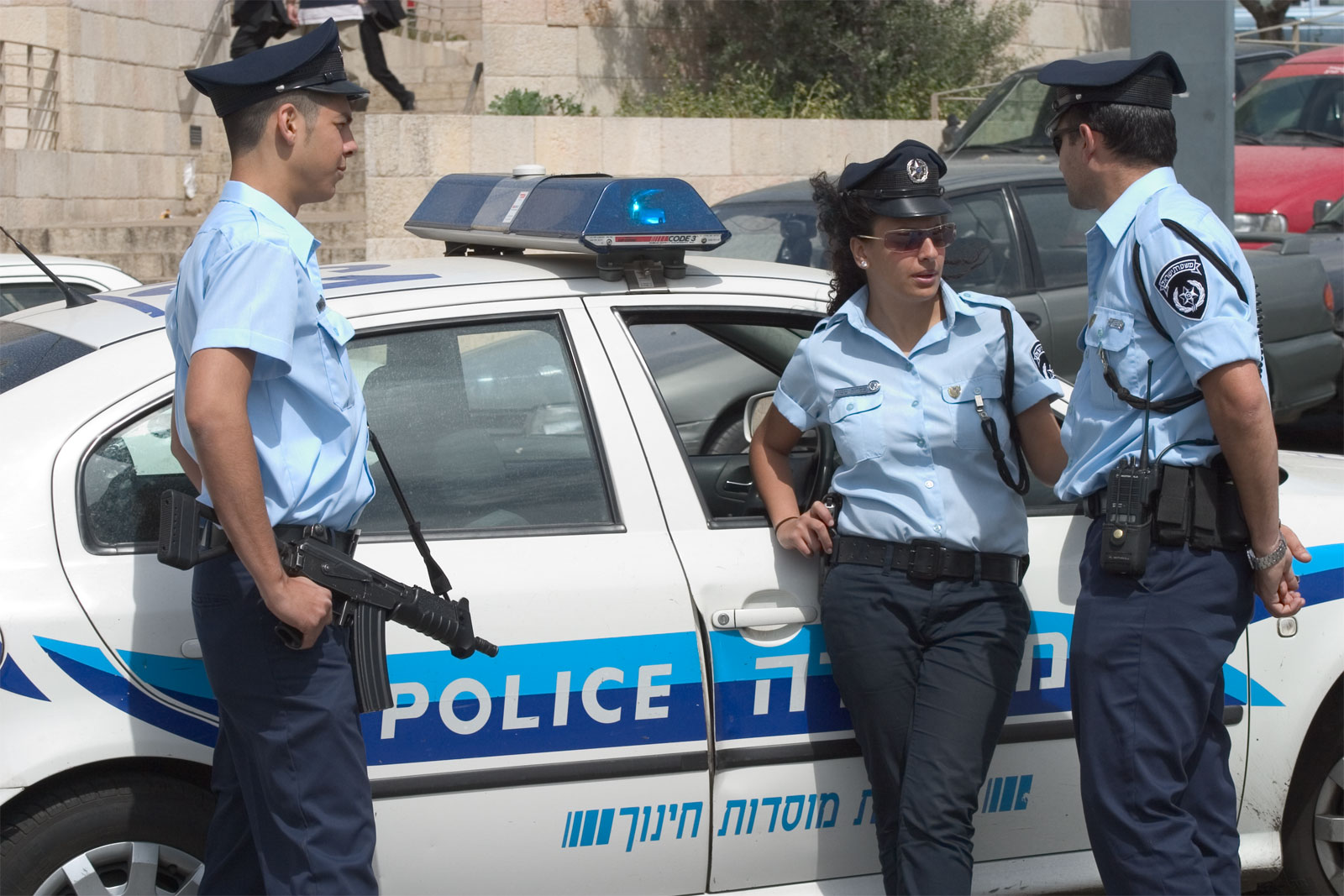
Israeli police officers and a patrol car

- Israel Police: A civilian police force responsible for law enforcement and maintaining public safety.
  - Border Police: A gendarmerie responsible for border security.
  - Civil Guard: A volunteer organization of Israeli citizens which assists in daily police work.
  - National Guard: An operational body which assists the police activity in routine and emergency situations.

== Intelligence ==
- Shin Bet (Israel Security Agency): The organization responsible for internal security, including in the Israeli-occupied territories.
- Mossad (Institute for Intelligence and Special Operations): The agency responsible for foreign intelligence.
- Aman (Directorate of Military Intelligence): The agency responsible for military intelligence. It produces comprehensive national intelligence estimates for the prime minister and cabinet, daily intelligence reports, risk of war estimates, target studies on nearby countries, and communications intercepts. Aman also conducts across-border agent operations. Aman is an independent service, co-equal with the army, navy and air force. Aman has an estimated staff of 7,000.

== Emergency services ==
- Magen David Adom (Red Shield of David): Made up of volunteer and professional medical responders, they provide emergency medical, disaster, ambulance, and blood services.
- Israel Fire and Rescue Services: Responsible for extinguishing fires and civilian rescue operations.
- Home Front Command: An IDF military rescue team, which handles large-scale civilian disasters such as earthquakes, collapsed buildings and missile attacks on cities.
- Unit 669: The Israeli Air Force medevac extraction unit.
- 11 Local Rescue teams in the Golan Heights, Galilee-Carmel, Jezreel Valley, Samaria, Ein Gedi, Megilot, Gush Etzion, Arad, Negev, Arava, and Eilat-Eilot.

== Other organizations ==
- Israel Prison Service: A security organization responsible for the holding of prisoners and detainees. The IPS coordinates with relevant national, regional and municipal authorities and organizations.
- Knesset Guard: Responsible for security in the Knesset compound and building, headed by the sergeant-at-arms.
