= Knesset building =

- משכן הכנסת
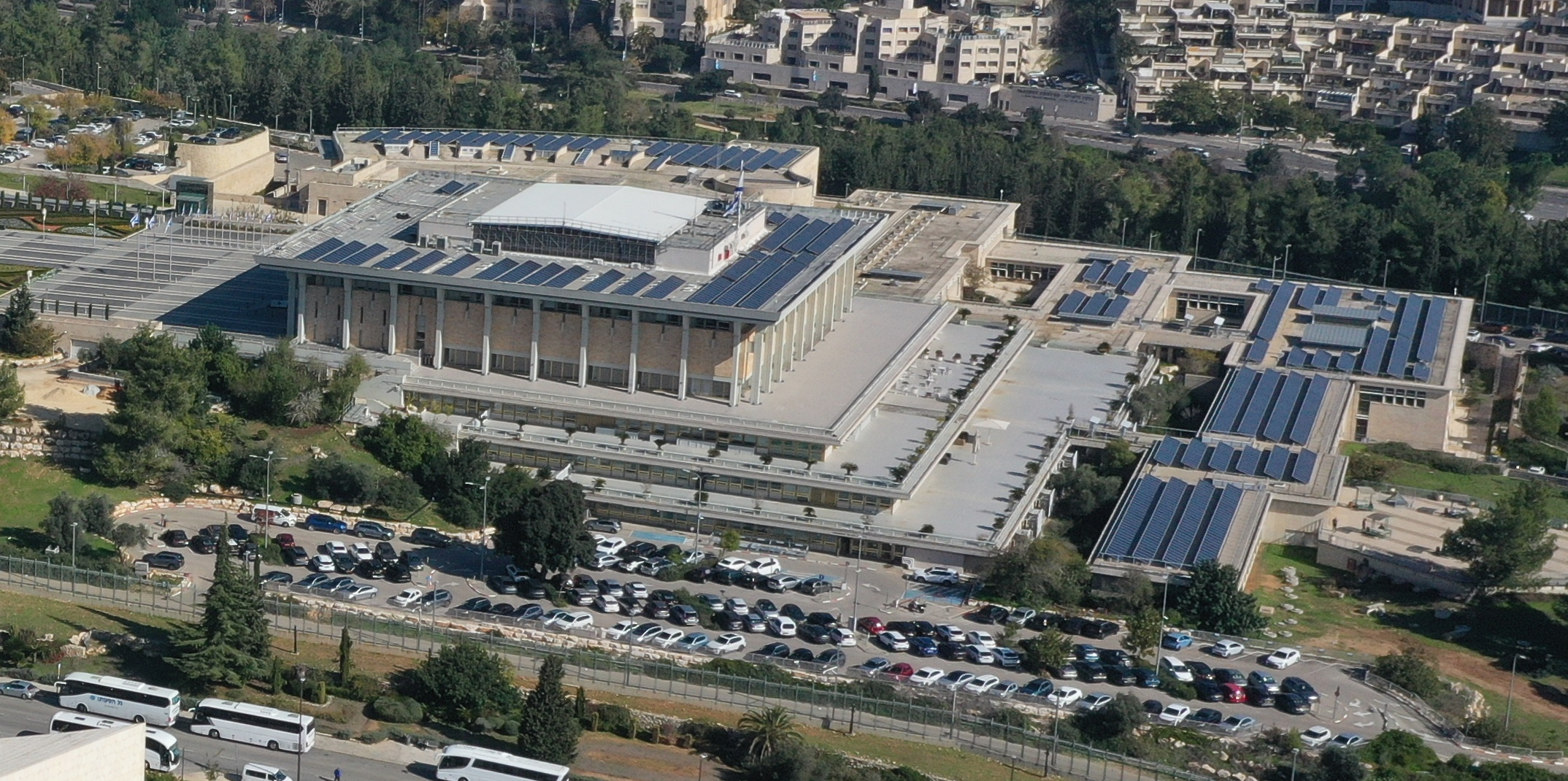
- Aerial view of the Knesset building, December 2023

- Location within Israel Location within Jerusalem

General information
- Architectural style: Brutalism
- Location: Kiryat HaMemshala, Jerusalem, Israel
- Construction started: 14 October 1958
- Completed: 22 August 1968 (building); 1992 (Southern extension); 2007 (Eastern extension)
- Client: Knesset

Technical details
- Floor count: 6
- Floor area: 50,000 square metres (540,000 sq ft)

Design and construction
- Architects: Ossip Klarwein (exterior); Dora Gad (interior)

Website
- main.knesset.gov.il/About/Building

The Knesset building (Hebrew: משכן הכנסת, Mishkan HaKnesset) is the seat of the Knesset, which is the legislature of Israel. The building is situated in Kiryat HaMemshala, a government complex in Jerusalem, and was built between 1958 and 1966. The exterior was designed by a Polish-born German-Israeli architect Ossip Klarwein, while the interior was designed by Dora Gad.

The Knesset building has six stories, housing the Knesset's Plenum, as well as the offices of its committees, departments, and legislators. The compound also contains the Knesset Library and the Chagall Lounge. The Knesset was expanded twice, with southern and eastern wings being added in later years. The building currently stands at 50,000 square feet.

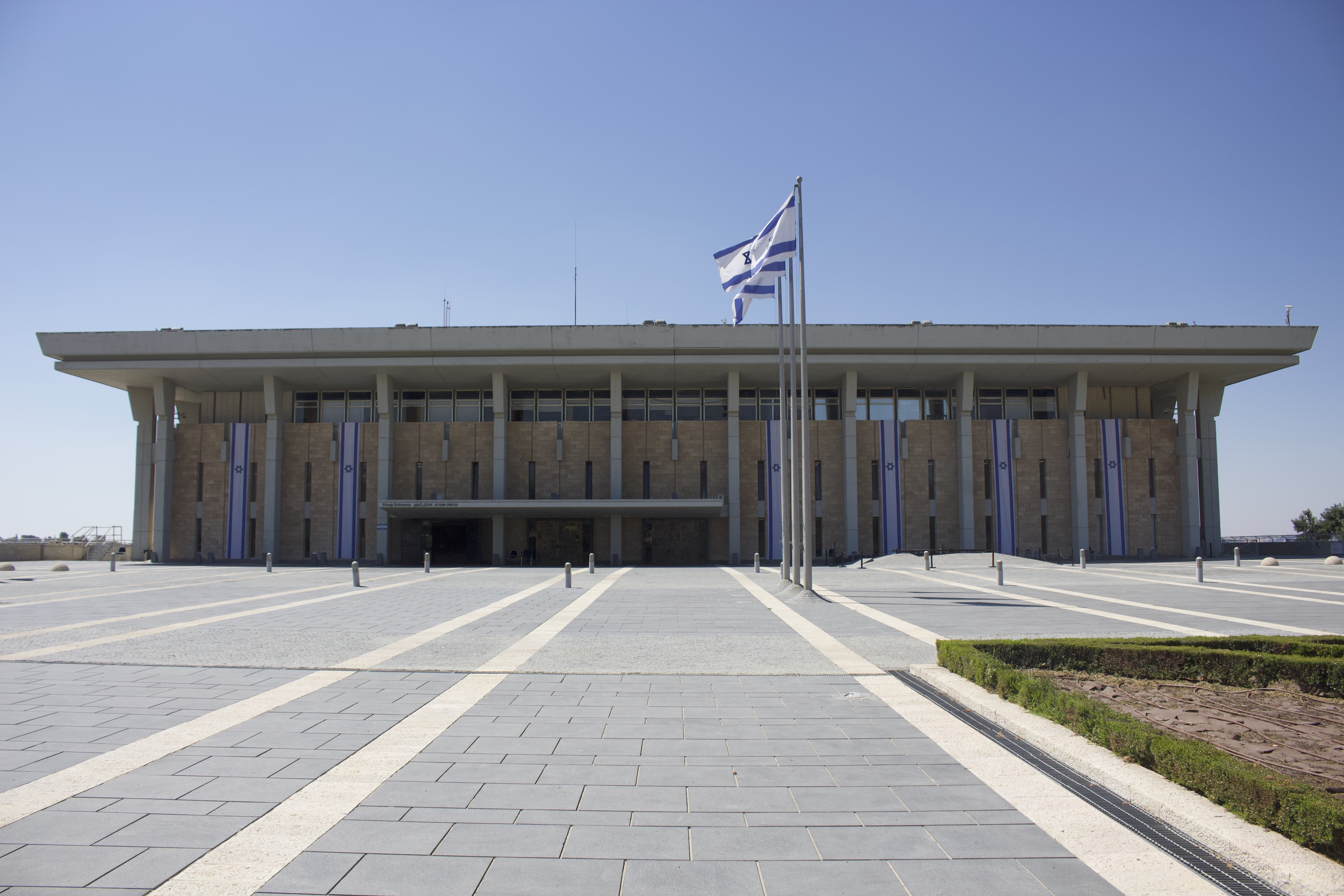
Front view of the Knesset, 2022

== History ==
=== Temporary seats ===
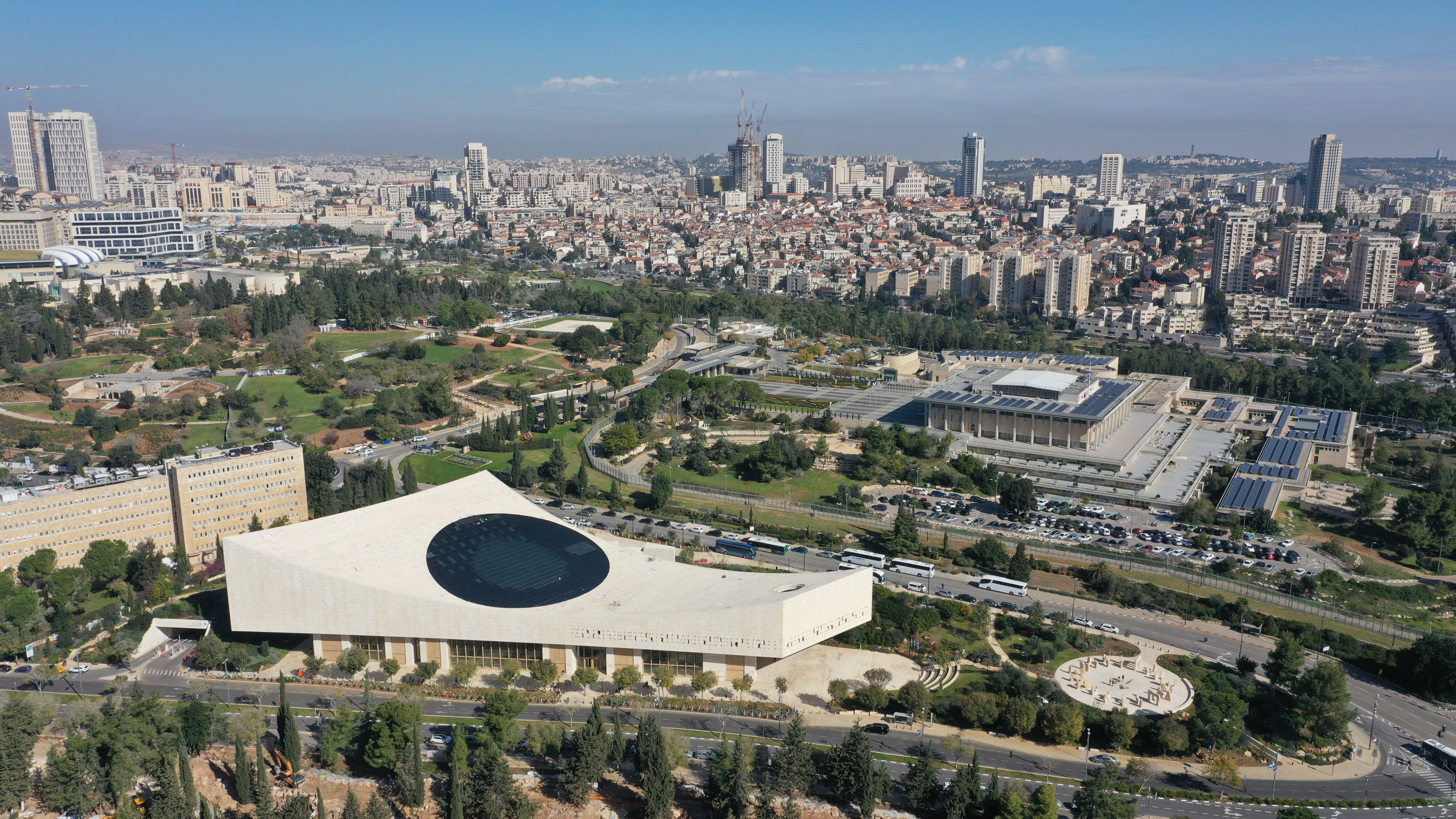
New National Library of Israel complex, 2023

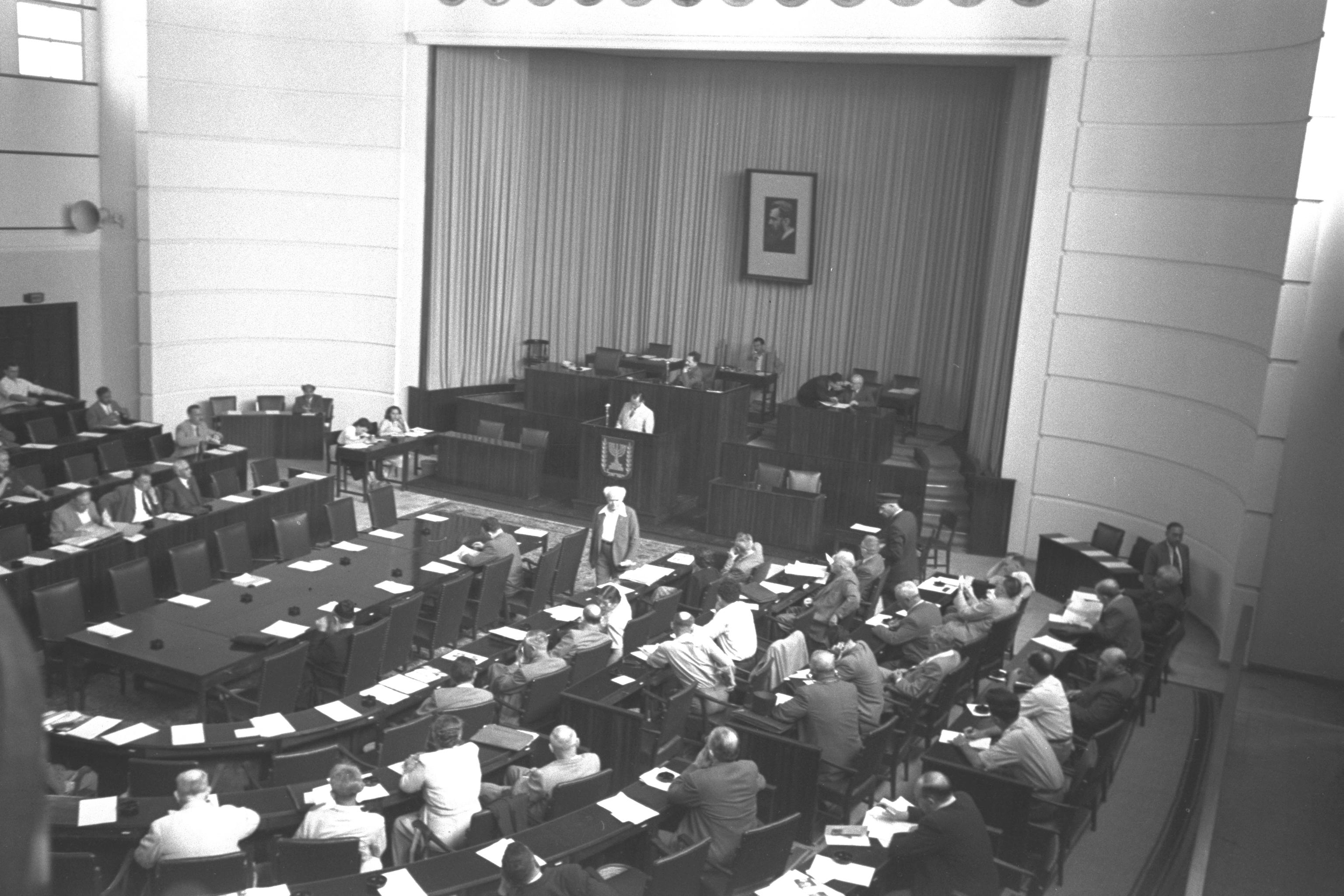
A meeting of the first Knesset at the Kessem Cinema, 1949

Ahead of Israeli Independence, the leadership of the Yishuv formed the People's Council and the National Council on 18 April 1948, with both organizations working out of the Jewish National Fund's headquarters in Tel Aviv. Following the Israeli Declaration of Independence, both organizations were replaced by the Provisional State Council, which remained at the JNF's headquarters until June, when they were evicted by JNF personnel who returned from Jerusalem. Following their eviction, the Council relocated to the Wilhelm Aberle house, convening on the second floor in a room consisting of two converted bedrooms and preparing for a general election to be held later that year. (Note: The Israeli Declaration of Independence stated elections should be held no later than October of 1948. The Constituent Assembly (later the First Knesset) was ultimately elected in January of 1949) After the election was postponed in July, the council moved to the Tel Aviv Museum of Art, convening mostly in the evenings to avoid disrupting the museum's operations.

The First Knesset convened its first four meetings between 14 and 17 February 1949 in the National Institutions House in Jerusalem. It then moved to the Kessem Cinema building, later the Opera Tower in Tel Aviv on 8 March.

In response to the passage United Nations General Assembly Resolution 303 in December 1949 which declared Jerusalem to be an International Zone, Jerusalem was declared the Capital of Israel, and the Knesset relocated to the JNF's regional headquarters. On 13 March 1950, it relocated to the Froumine House, where it remained until 1966.

=== Conception and construction ===
Discussions on the construction of a permanent Knesset building, alongside other government buildings at Givat Ram, began in April 1949. Initial proposals included building the Knesset near or inside the International Convention Center, in the current location of Beit HaNassi, or within Kiryat HaMemshala.

In 1955, it was decided to build the Knesset near Kiryat Hamemshala, both to reduce traffic and to symbolize the separation of powers. The Knesset began a contest to design the building in July 1956, but no Israeli Architects applied on account of the low budget. Nine days before the contest's winner was announced, it was announced that the recently deceased James de Rothschild had donated 1.25M£ to the building's construction in his will. In July 1957, the contest's winner was revealed to be a Polish-born German-Israeli Architect Ossip Klarwein.

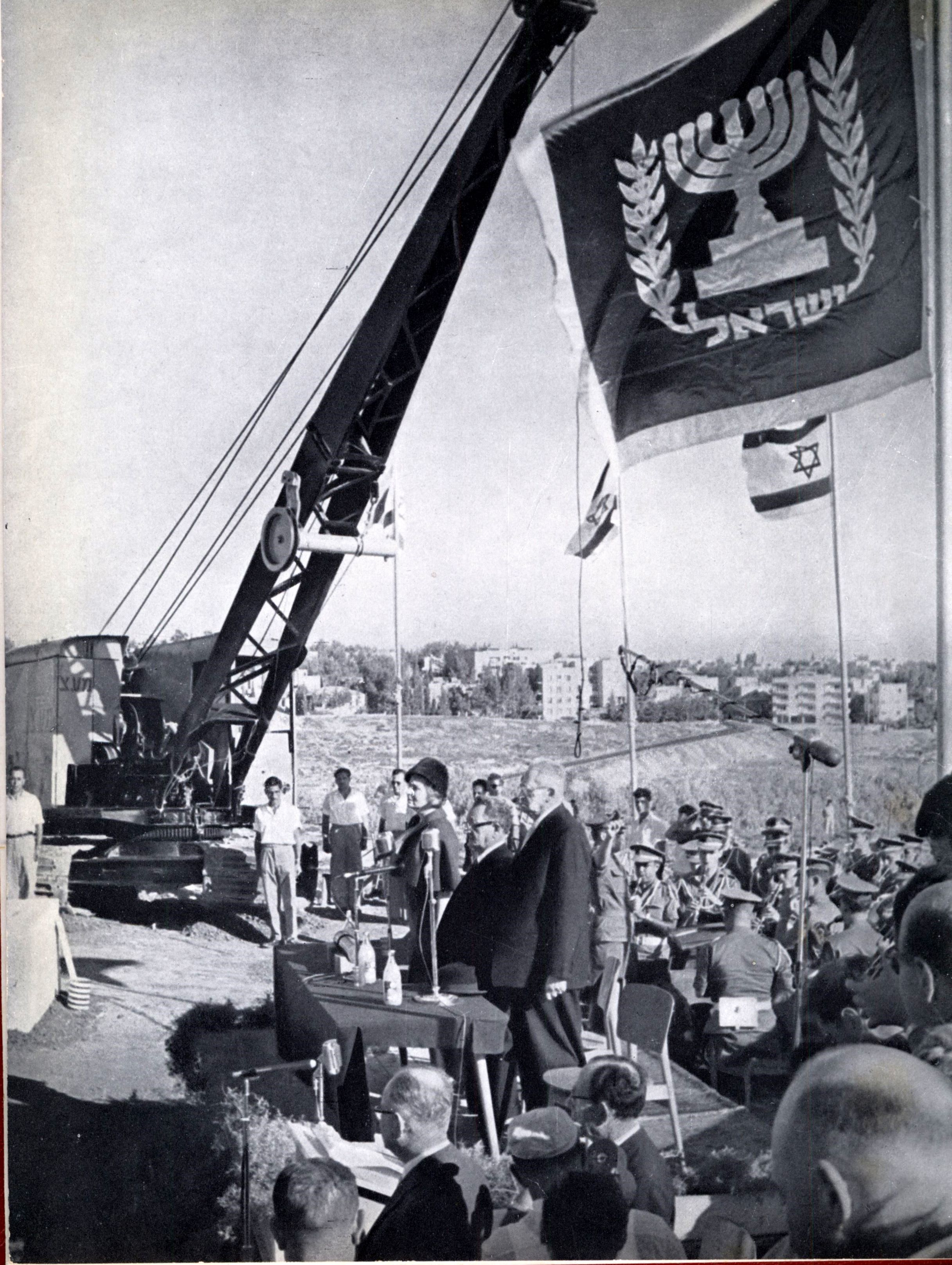
Laying of the Knesset building's cornerstone, 1958

The choice of Klarwein's design attracted criticism from Israeli architects, with the National Association of Israel Architects referring to it as "outdated" and "unrepresentative of Israel". Knesset Speaker Yosef Sprinzak responded by forming a committee of International Architects to study the design. The committee approved the design in April 1958.

The building's cornerstone was laid by Dorothy de Rothschild on 14 October 1958. In order to make Klarwein's design less controversial, the Knesset appointed Dov Karmi to advise on the building's construction. Karmi and his son Ram made several adjustments to Klarwein's design - shrinking the building's size, turning its rectangular shape into a square and moving several of its offices to the building's outskirts. The building was built by the National Roads Company and several contractors, including Solel Boneh. The Knesset's interior was designed primarily by Dora Gad, while sculptor Dani Karavan created the sculpture "Pray for the Peace of Jerusalem", which lies behind the speaker's podium.

The Knesset building's inauguration was originally set for Tu B'Av on 1 August 1966, but was postponed until the 22nd of August, when the building's ownership was formally handed to Knesset Speaker Kadish Luz by Labor Minister Yigal Allon.

==== Inauguration ceremony ====
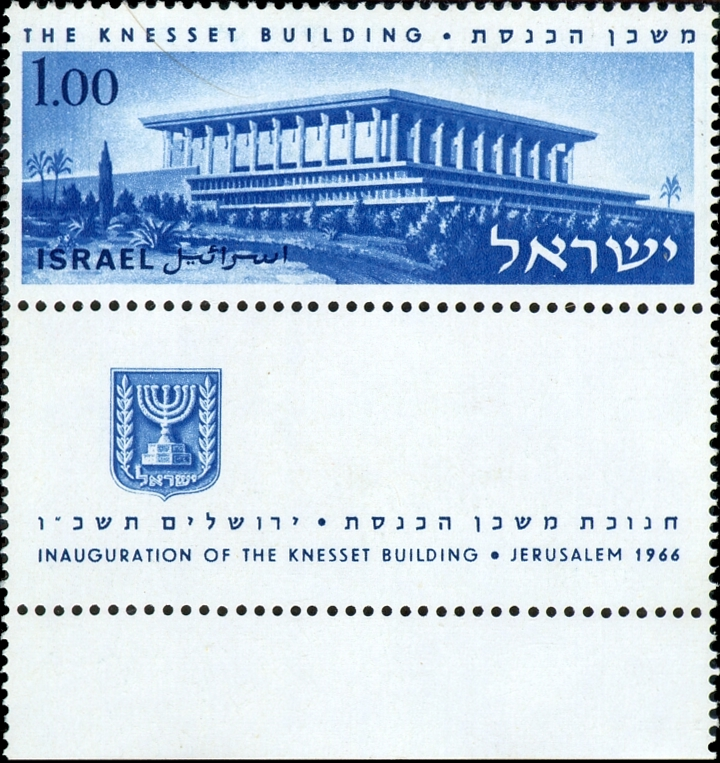
Commemorative stamp for the Knesset's Inauguration. 1966

The building's construction lasted 5 years and cost 22 Million ILP. In February 1960, the State Comptroller of Israel released a report criticizing budgetary irregularities in the construction. After the building's construction, several ceremonies were held to inaugurate the building beginning on 29 August 1966. Several dozen heads of foreign legislatures arrived to partake in the ceremonies, and were greeted by Kadish Luz at Lod Airport.

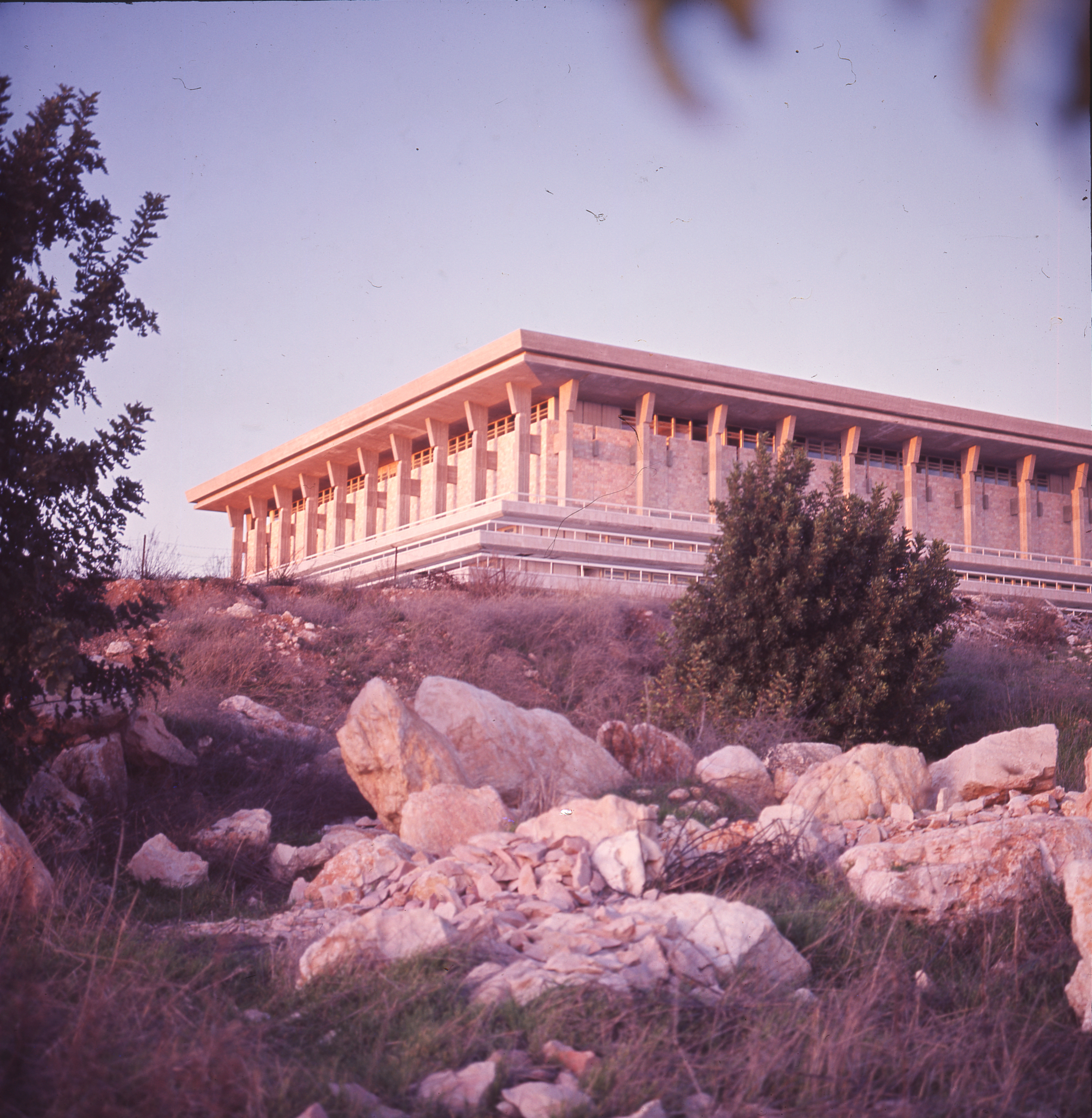
Knesset building in 1966

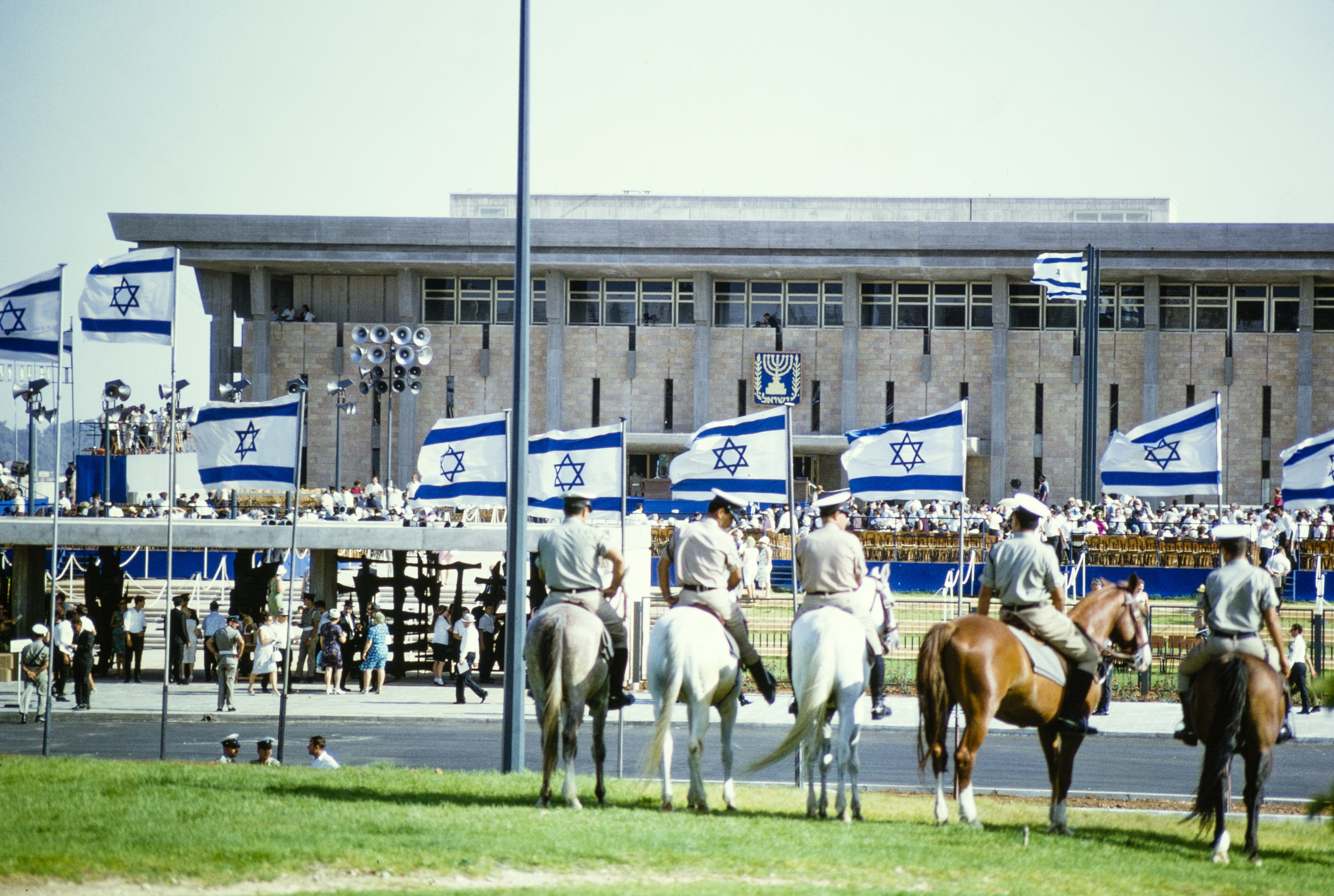
Main Inauguration Ceremony, 30 August 1966

The main inauguration ceremony, held on 30 August 1966, was attended by approximately 5,000 people. The next morning, the Knesset held its inaugural meeting in the building, which was attended by the head of the foreign legislatures. Guests included House of Commons Speaker Horace King, as well as the heads of the legislatures of Canada, Austria, West Germany, France, Norway, Sweden, Finland, the Ivory Coast, Sierra Leone, Australia and Japan, as well as Senator Walter Mondale and members of the United States House of Representatives. The Speaker of Iceland's Althing spoke at the event.

==== 60s and 70s ====
The Knesset was shelled by Jordanian forces during the Six-Day War in 1967.

The land upon which the Knesset building lies was leased for 99 years from the Greek Orthodox Church in 1951. The Israeli Government purchased the land from the church in the 1990s.

==== First expansion ====
Speaker Menachem Savidor lobbied for the expansion of the Knesset building as early as 1984. Around 1986, a large pit was dug out south of the Knesset to prepare for a future expansion. After construction was delayed due to budgetary shortfalls, caravans were placed within the pit to serve as temporary office space for Knesset members. Construction began after the Knesset allocated additional funds in 1989. The wing, which was given the name Negba, was completed in the early 1990s.

=== Future expansion ===
In August 2019, Jerusalem's municipal planning committee authorized another expansion of the Knesset building. The plan intended on doubling the building's size, expanding the building of the Knesset Guard, and creating solar panel installations near the building for environmental reasons. The expansion also includes a station on the Jerusalem Light Rail. The plan faces criticism from environmental activists for the proposed allotment of four vehicles for each member of the Knesset, and for the planned size of the expansion, which would results in the removal of 700 trees and create a compound bigger than the Palace of Westminster and United States Capitol.

== Interior ==
=== Entrance and Knesset Courtyard ===
The Knesset building is located near Givat Ram, with most entrances facing north. The main entrance, known as the Etrog entrance, connects to the building's fourth floor and goes through the Knesset's courtyard. The entrance to the courtyard once went through the Palombo gate, an Iron gate overlaid with a memorial to victims of the Holocaust. Following renovations in November 2007, the gate was moved to a different location alongside a sculpture of the burning bush.

Opposite the main entrance lies the Knesset Menorah, a sculpture of the Temple menorah made by British sculptor Benno Elkan and donated to the Knesset by the British Parliament. Besides the entrance lies a cenotaph to Israel's war casualties.

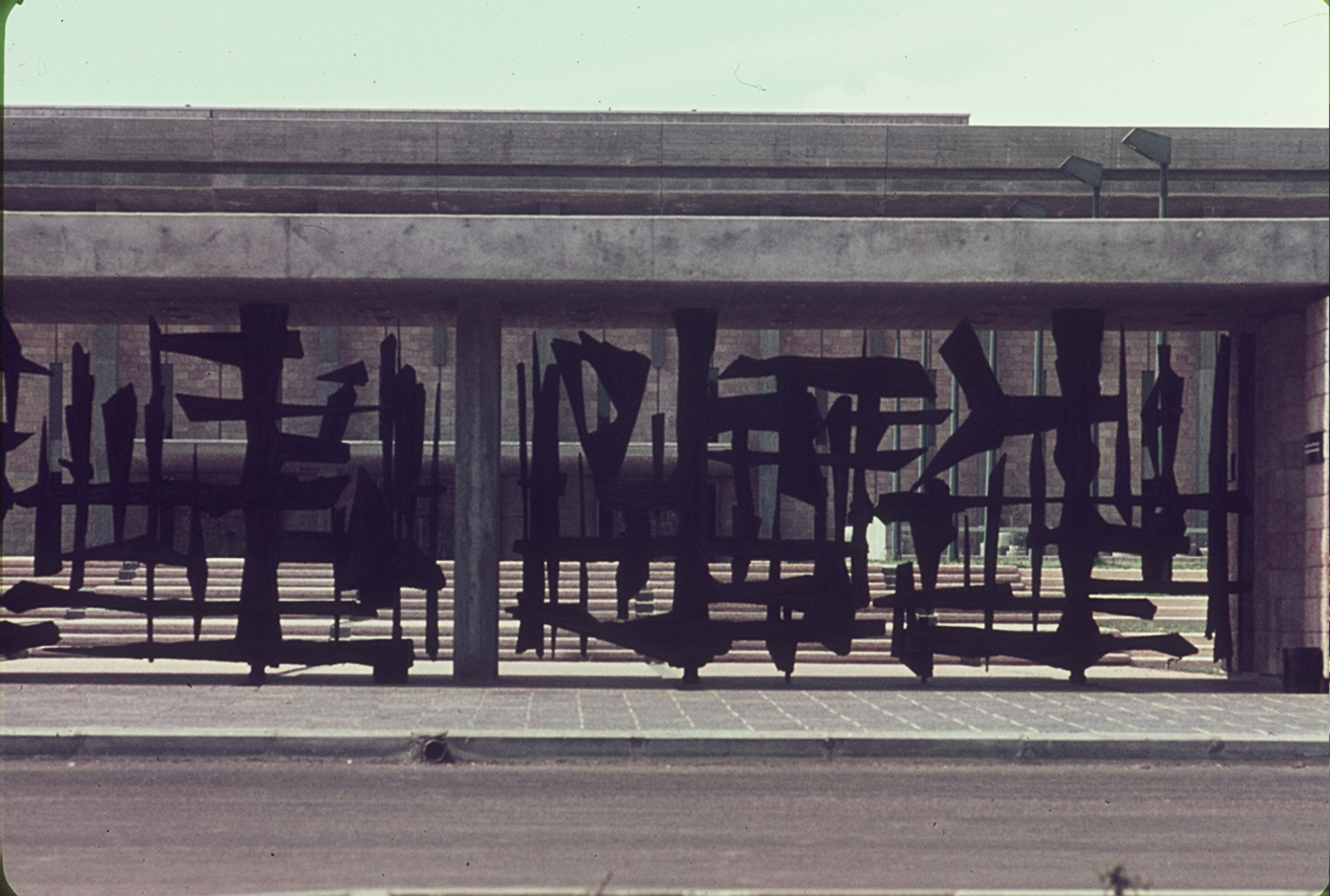
Palombo gate

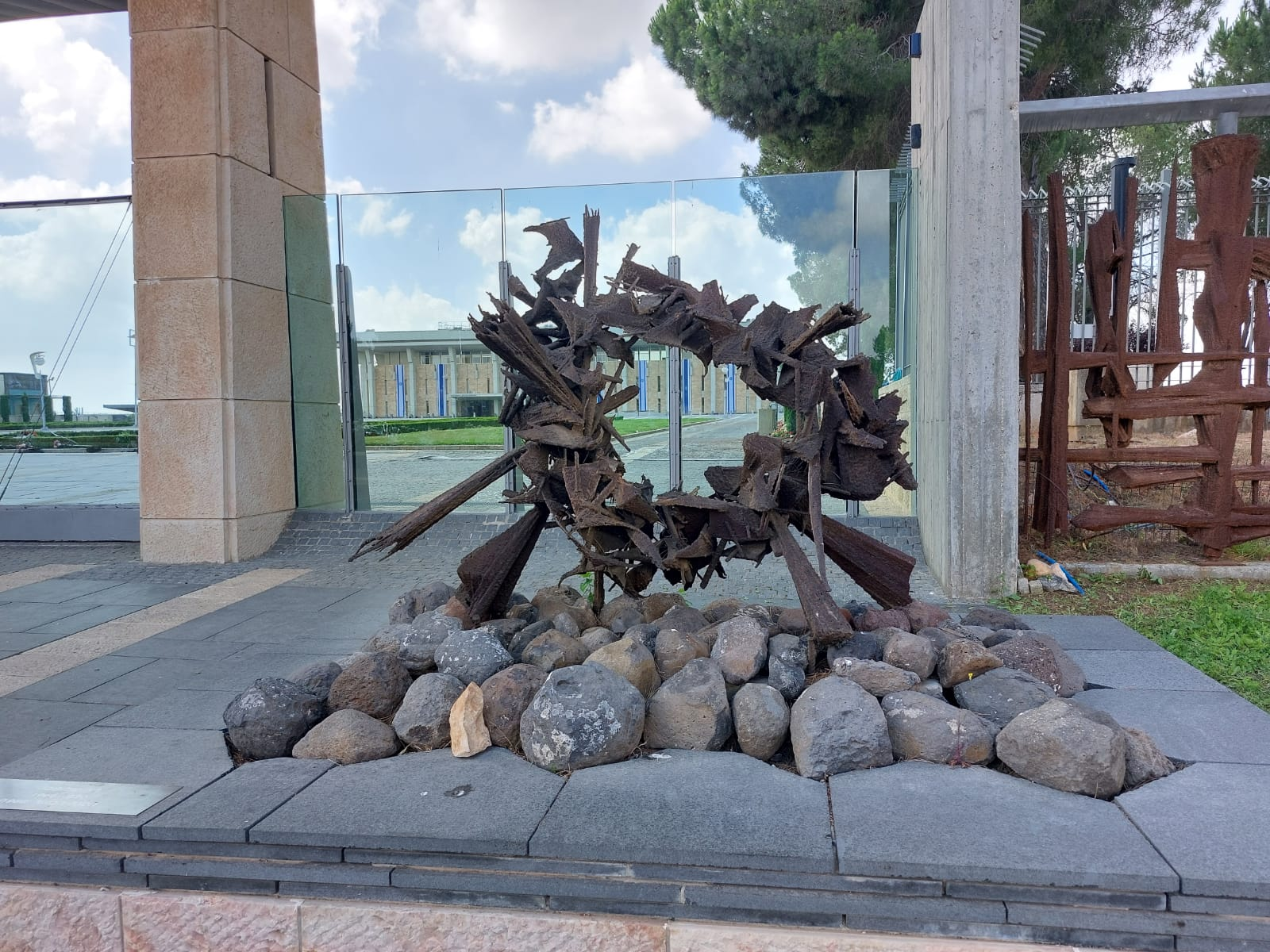
Burning bush sculpture

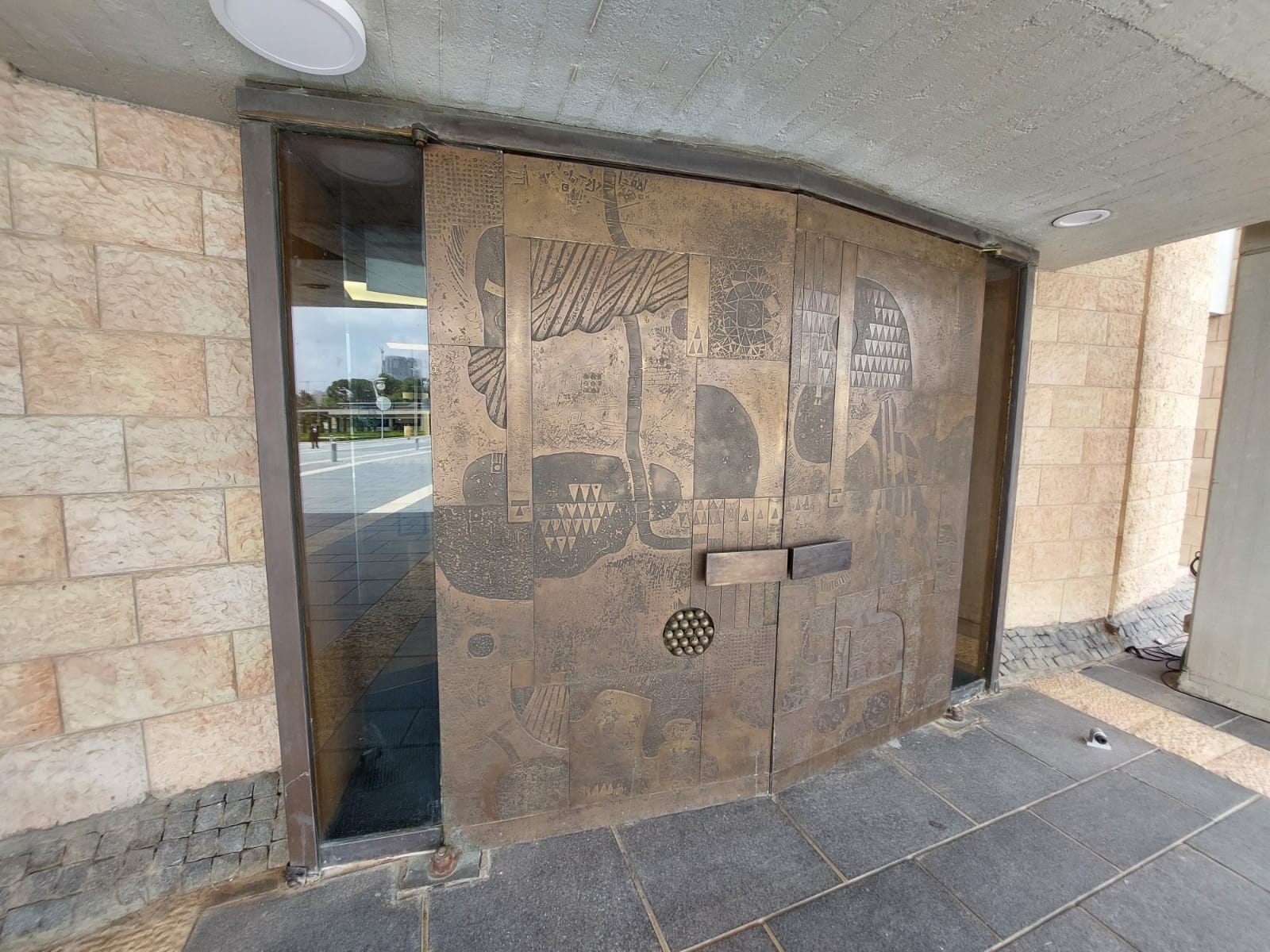
A door at the 'Gate of the Tribes' Entrance

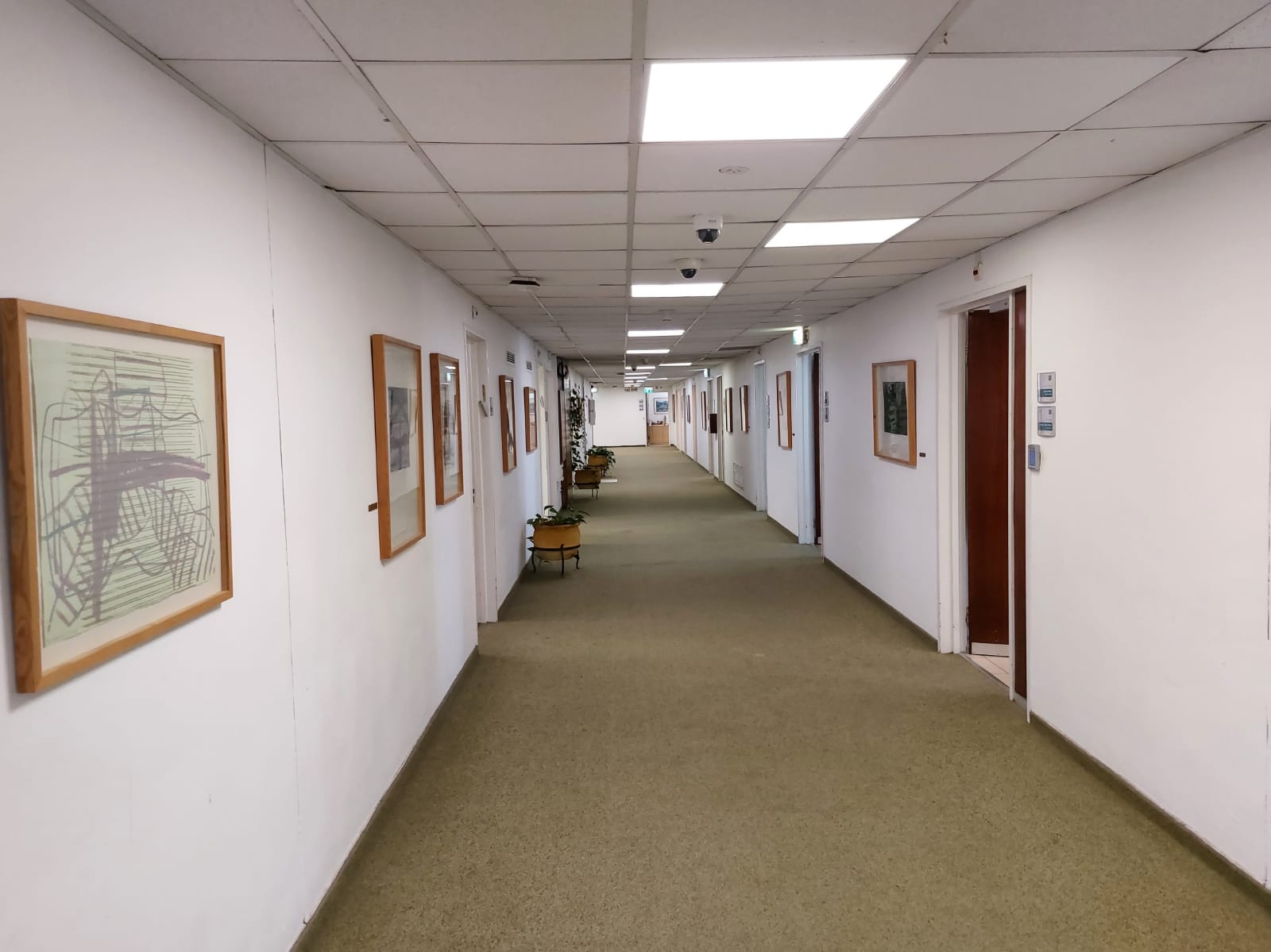
Hallway on the 5th floor

==== Chagall Lounge ====
The Chagall lounge lies on the fourth floor, and is used to host official events. The lounge includes multiple works of art by its namesake Marc Chagall. The lounge also includes a stairway which leads to the speaker's office and the Knesset Plenum.

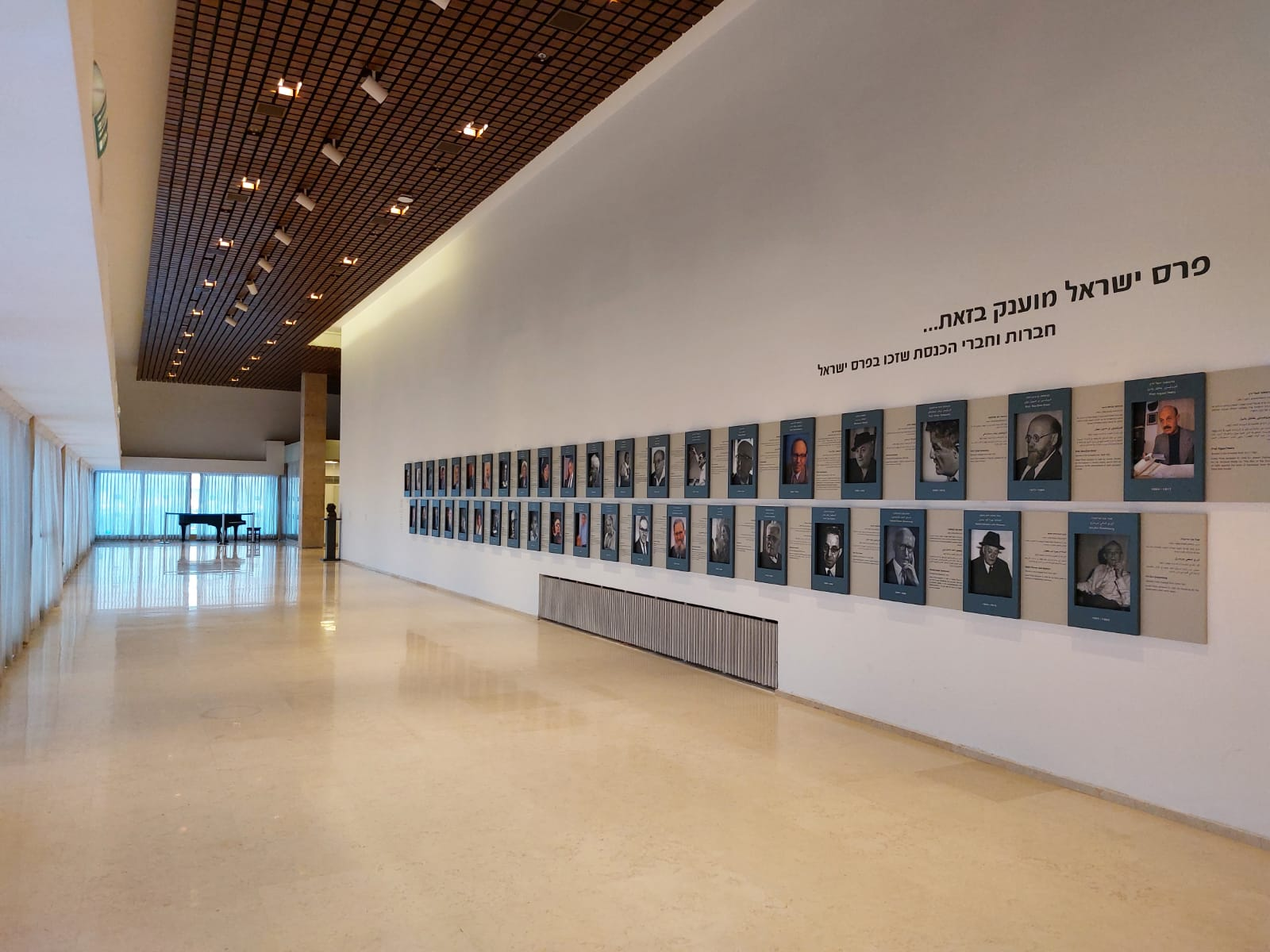
Photos of all members of the Knesset who won the Israel Prize

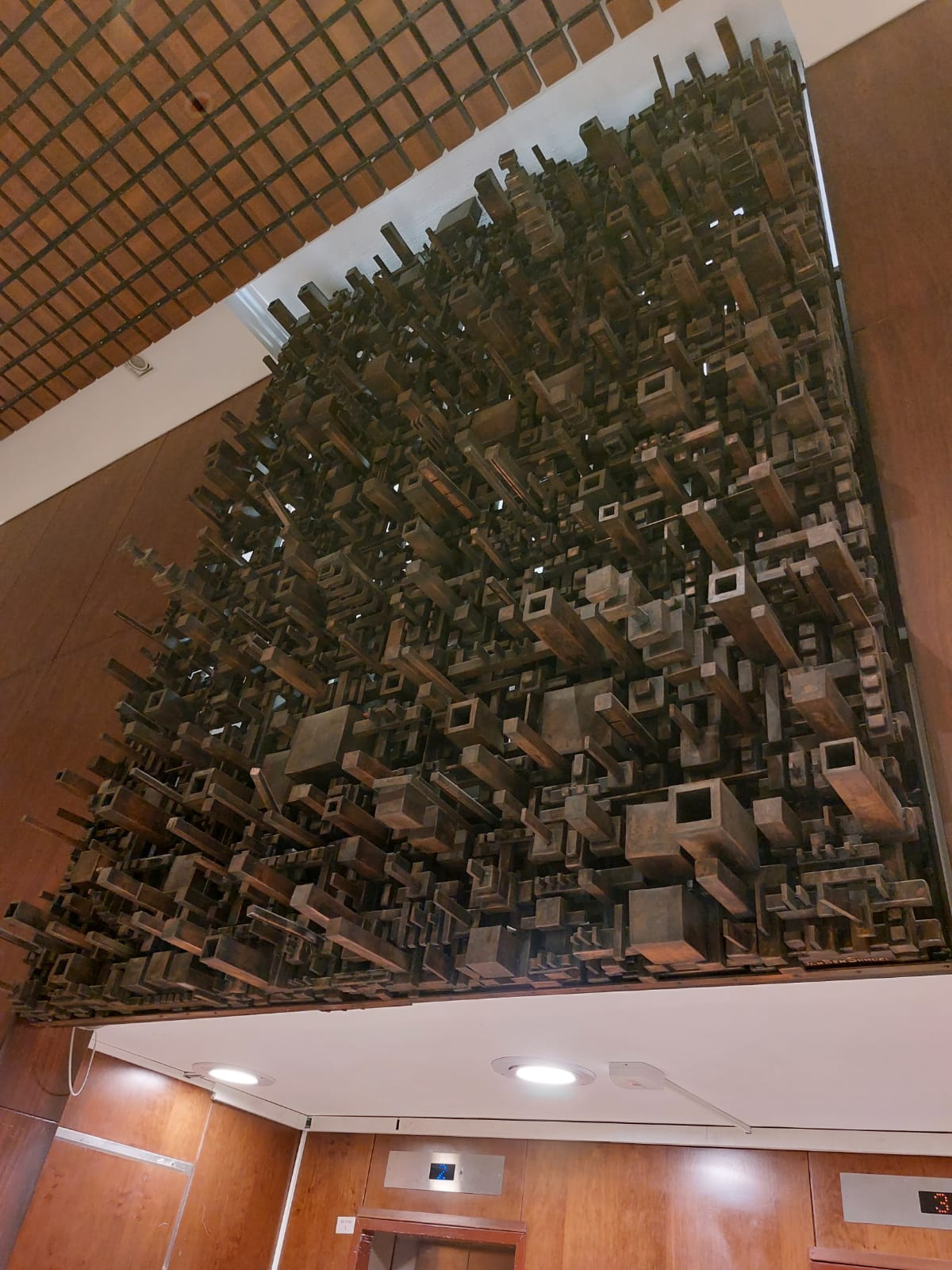
Bronze relief made by artist Dan Ben-Shmuel

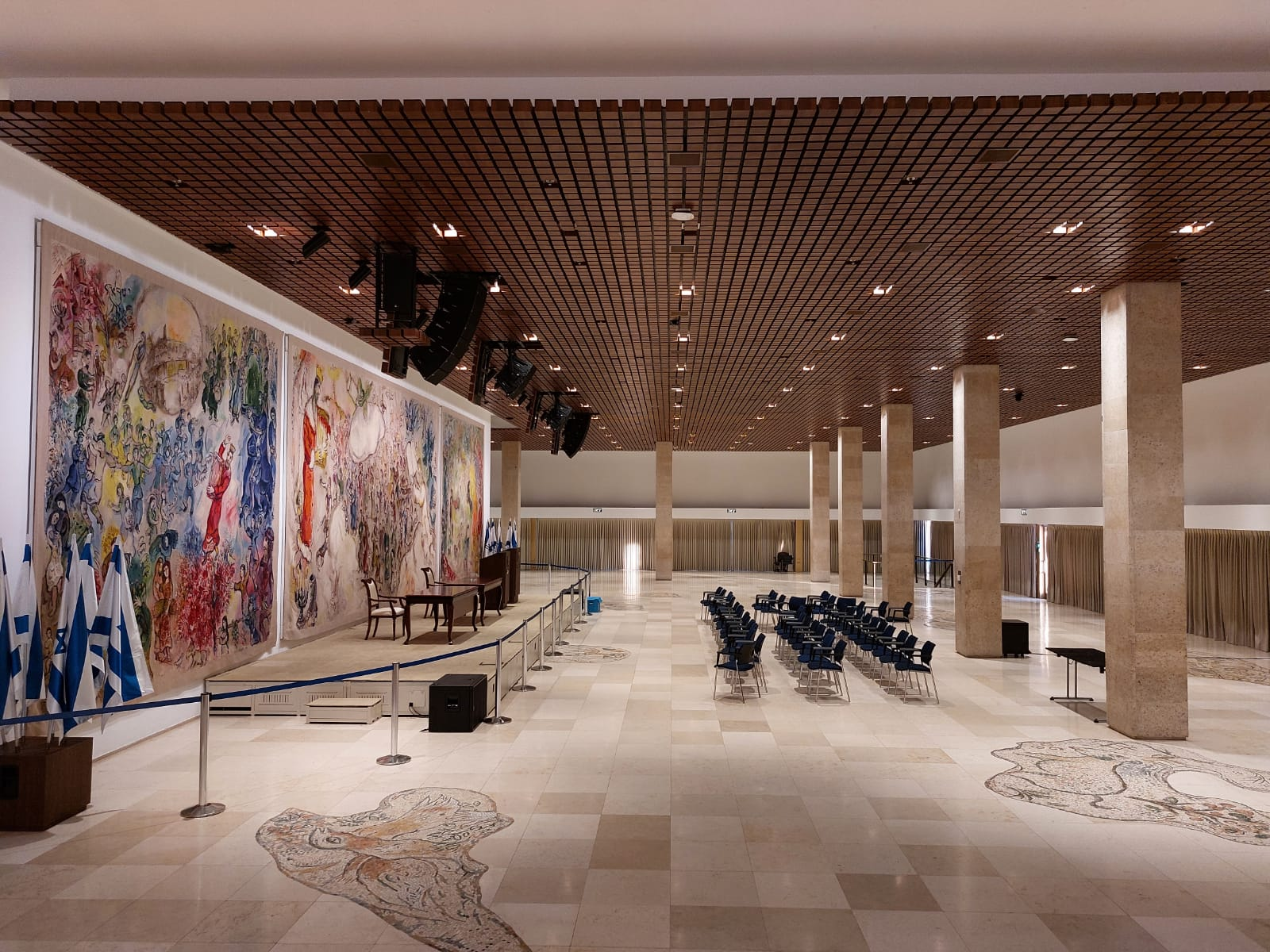
View of the Chagall lounge from the main entrance

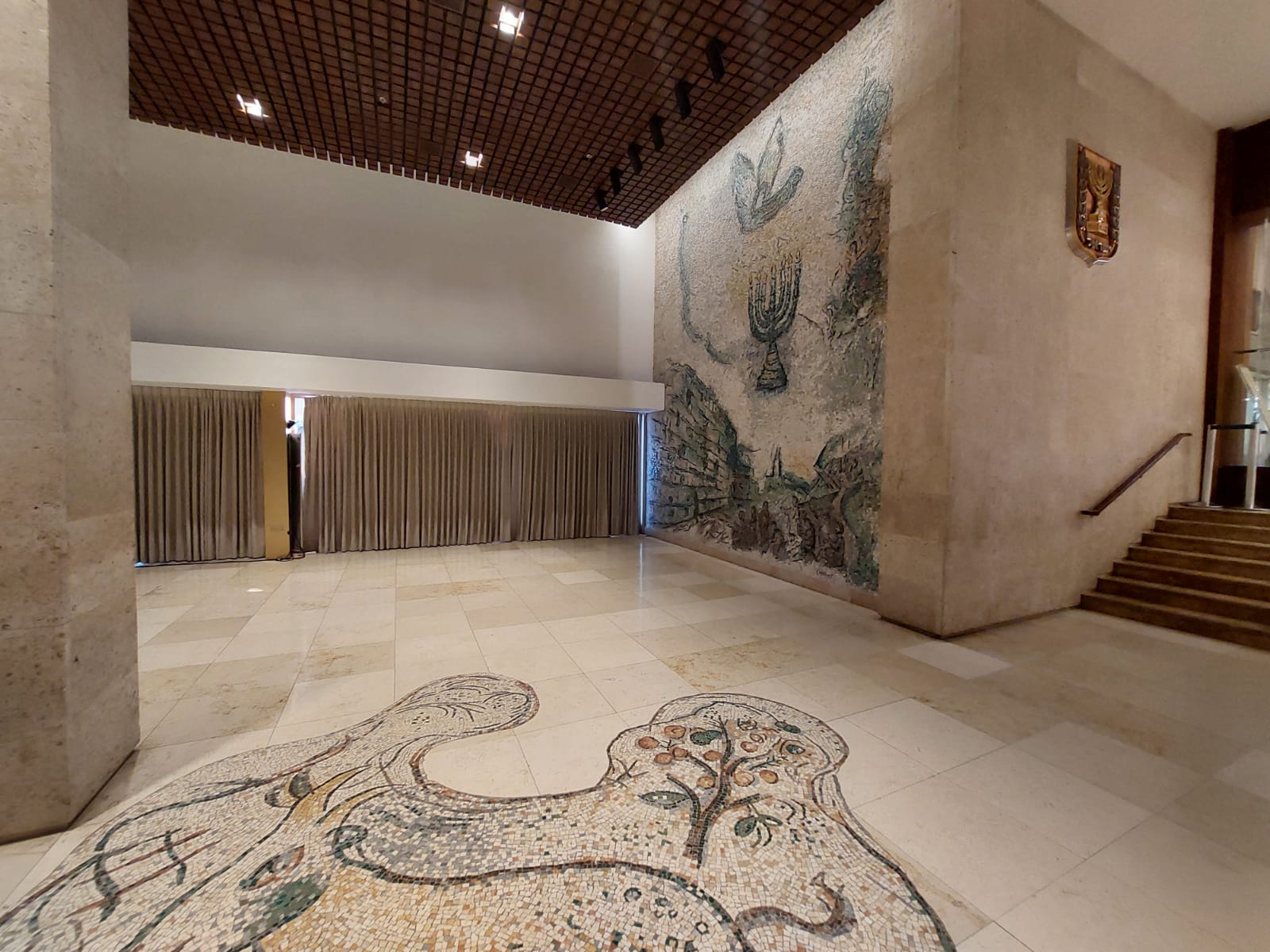
Mosaic wall at the Chagall lounge

=== First floor ===
The first floor was used by the Knesset's committees until 2007, when they moved to the Negba wing. The floor was subsequently converted into office space for members of the Knesset. The floor also contains the Knesset's synagogue.

=== Second floor ===
The Knesset's second floor primarily consists of office space used by government ministers. It also contains a conference room and an entrance to the Knesset Plenum. Art by painter Moshe Castel is presented in the hallway

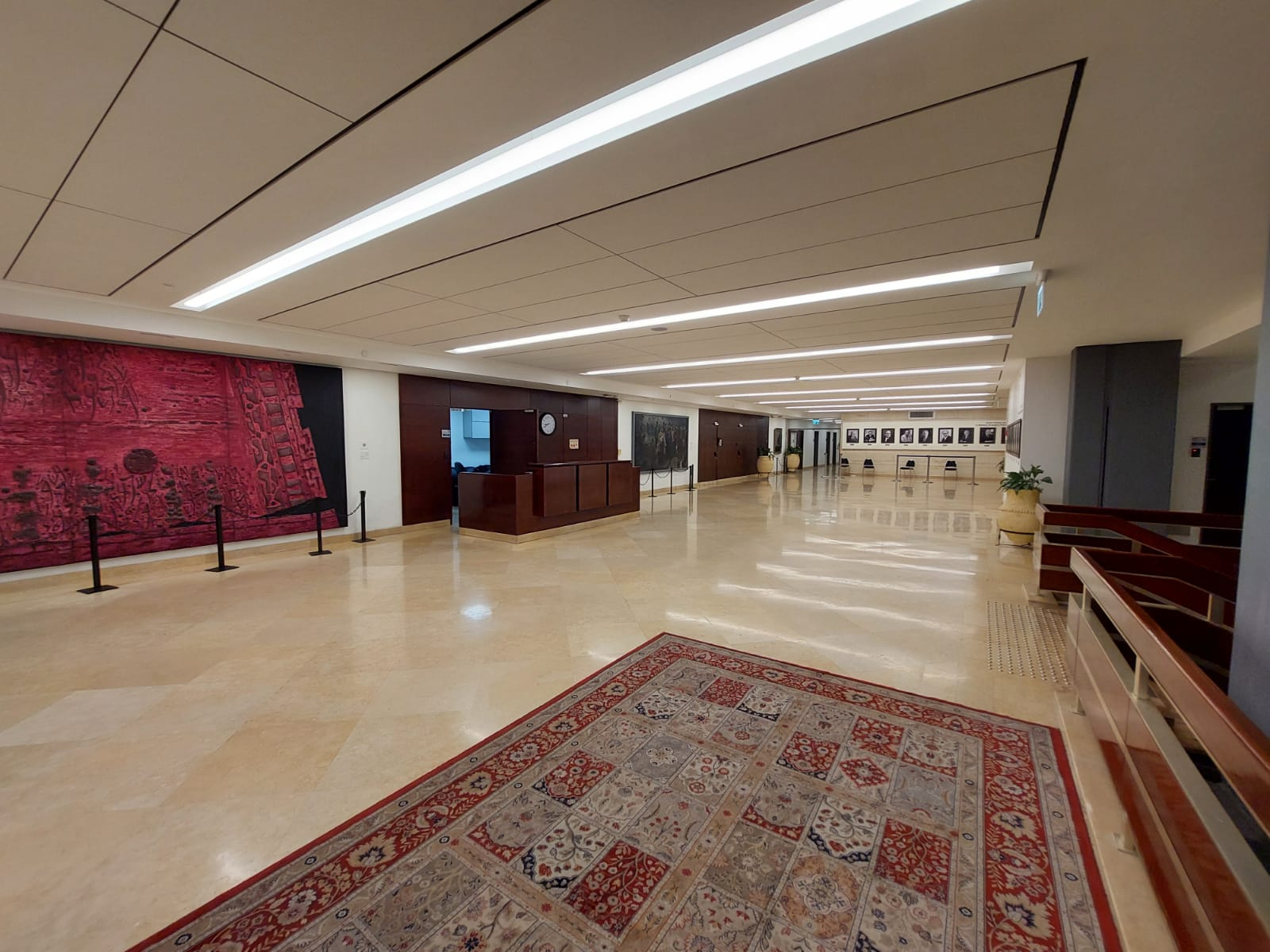
View of the first floor

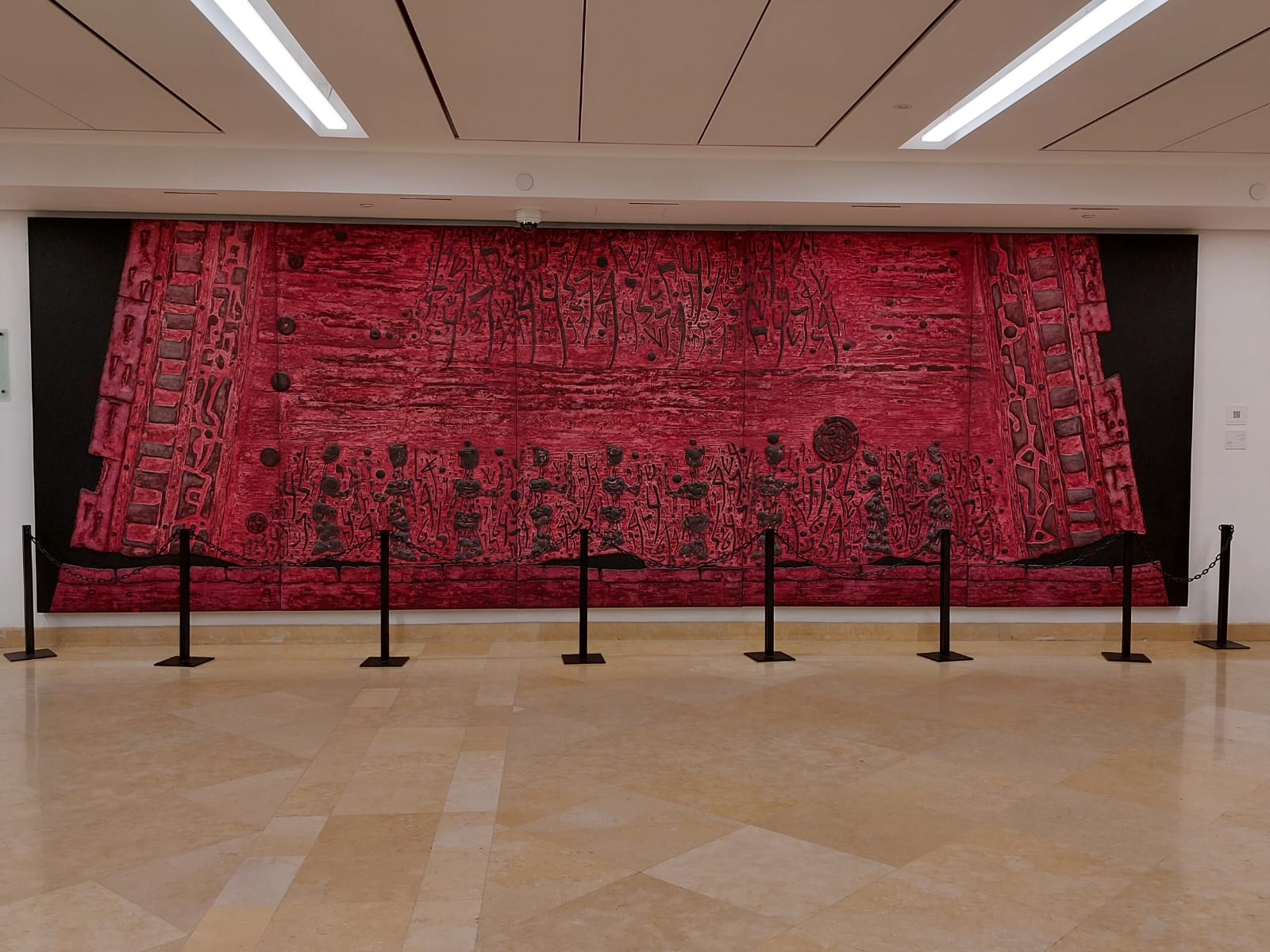
Artwork by Moshe Castel

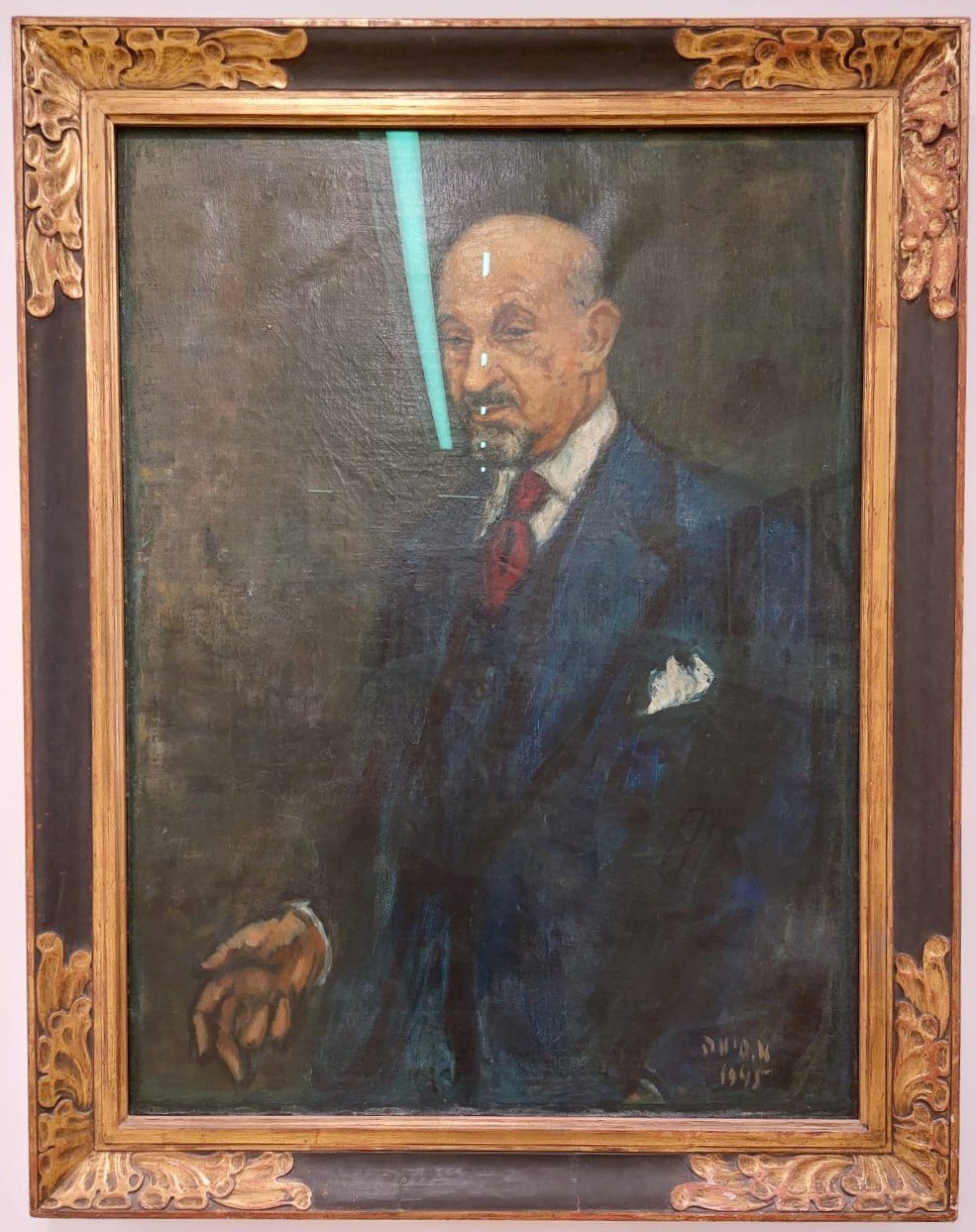
1945 portrait of Chaim Weizmann on display on the first floor

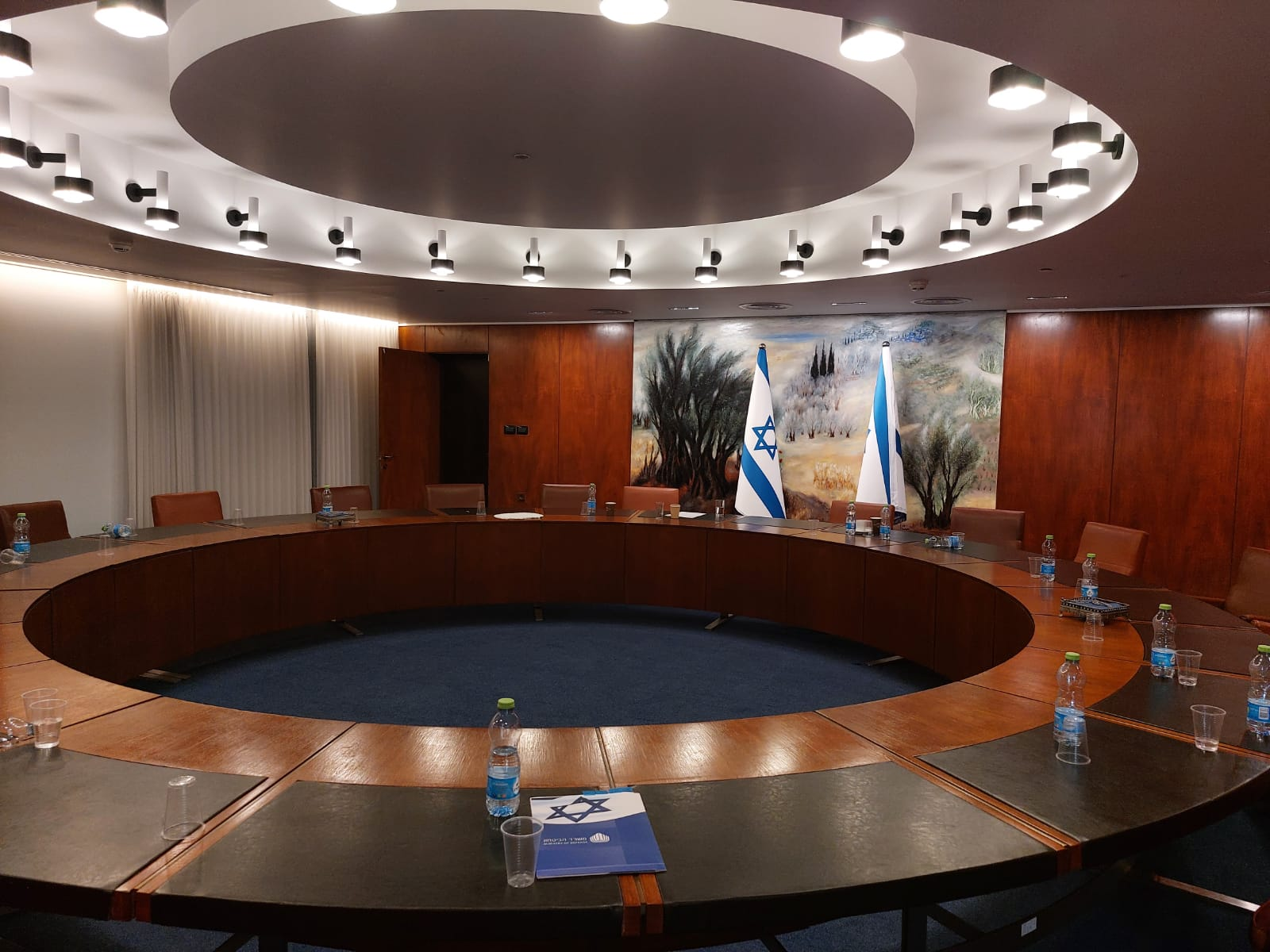
Cabinet meeting room

=== Third floor ===
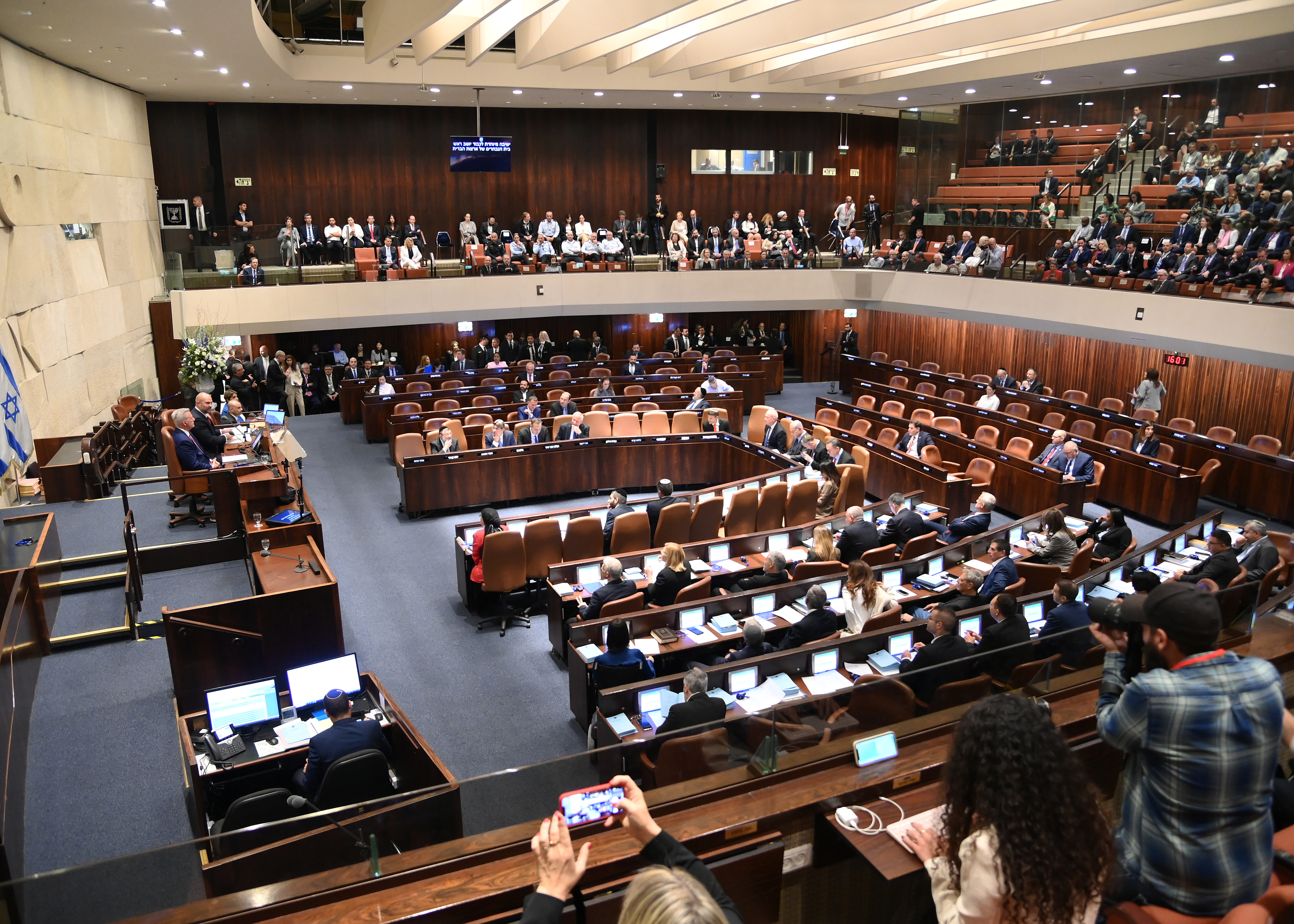
View of the Knesset plenum. Taken during Kevin McCarthy's visit to Israel in May 2023

The third floor includes the Plenary hall of the Knesset, where it conducts its plenary sessions. The hall includes 116 seats for members of the Knesset, as well as additional seats for members of the governing coalition. Members of the coalition are seated to the podium's left, while members of the opposition are seated to its right. At the front of the hall is a podium used by the Presiding Officer, the Knesset Secretary and two stenographers. Behind the podium is the sculpture "Pray for the Peace of Jerusalem", designed by Dani Karavan.

The third floor also includes the Knesset's canteens - one exclusive to members of the Knesset and their invitees, and another for the general public, as well as the Knesset's Library and infirmary.

=== Newer Wings ===
==== Negba Wing ====
The Negba wing contains 48 offices used by Knesset members, as well as a 330-seat auditorium used for events.

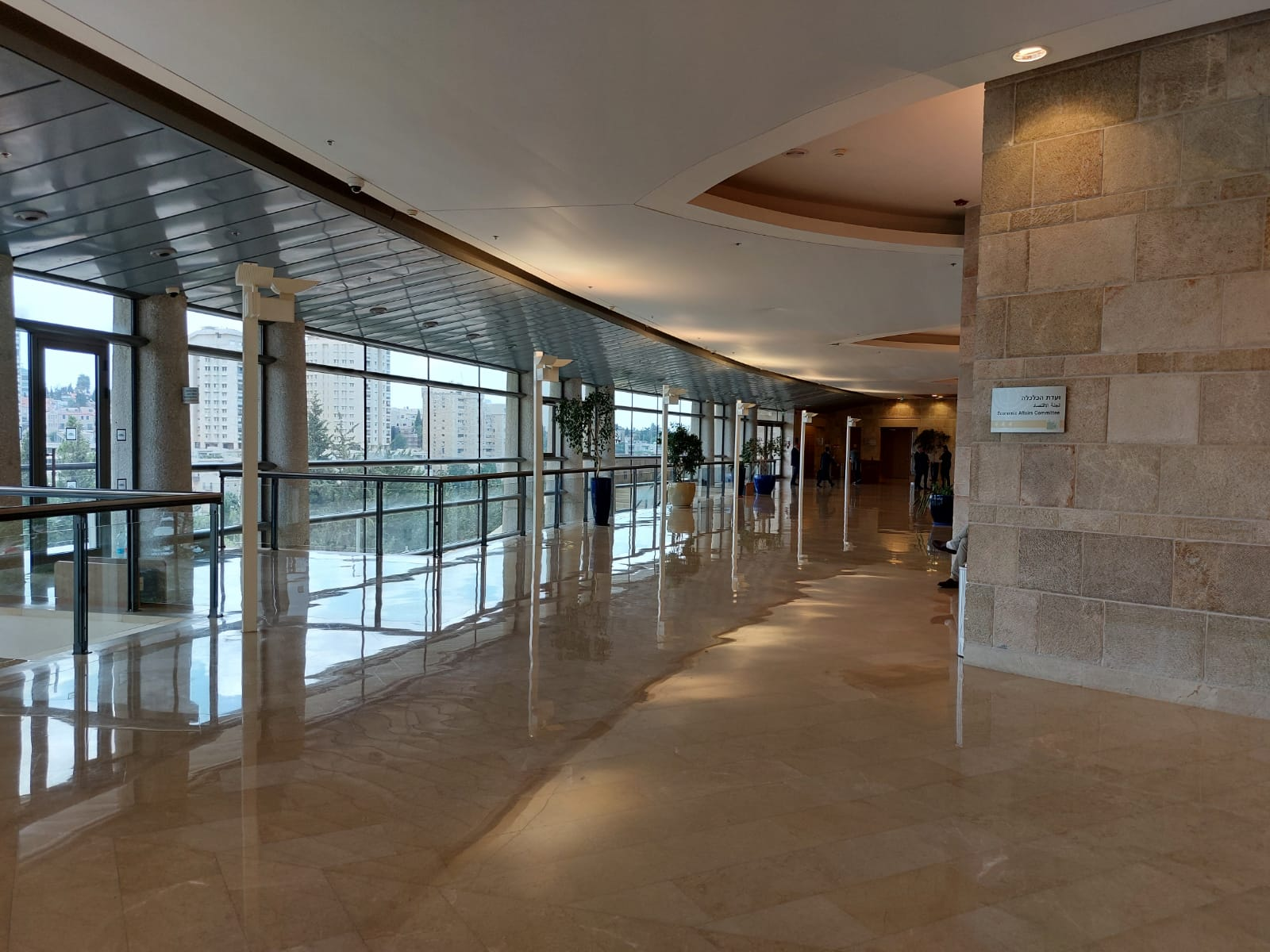
Hallway near Knesset committee rooms

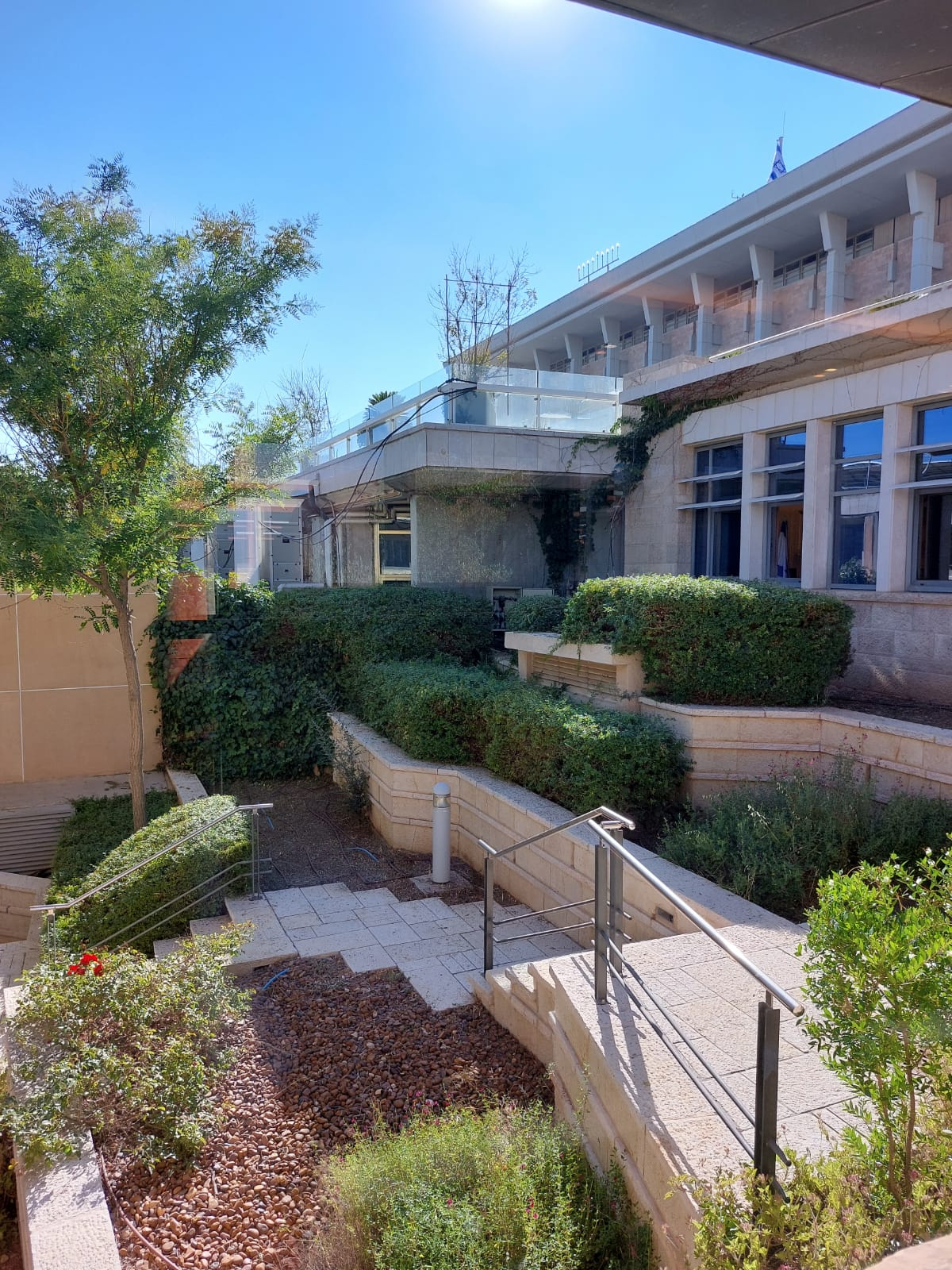
Courtyard at the Kedma wing

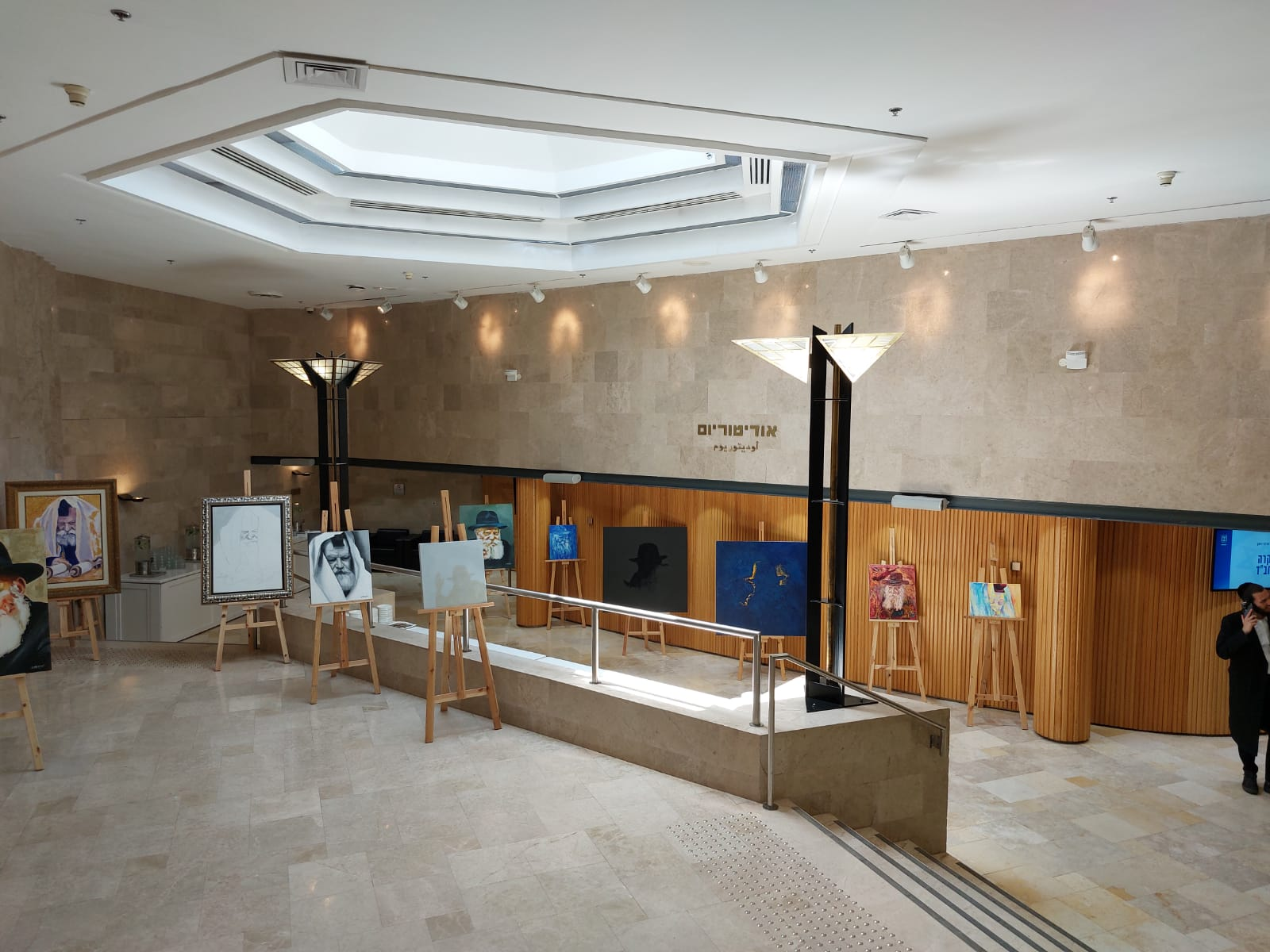
Knesset Auditorium entrance

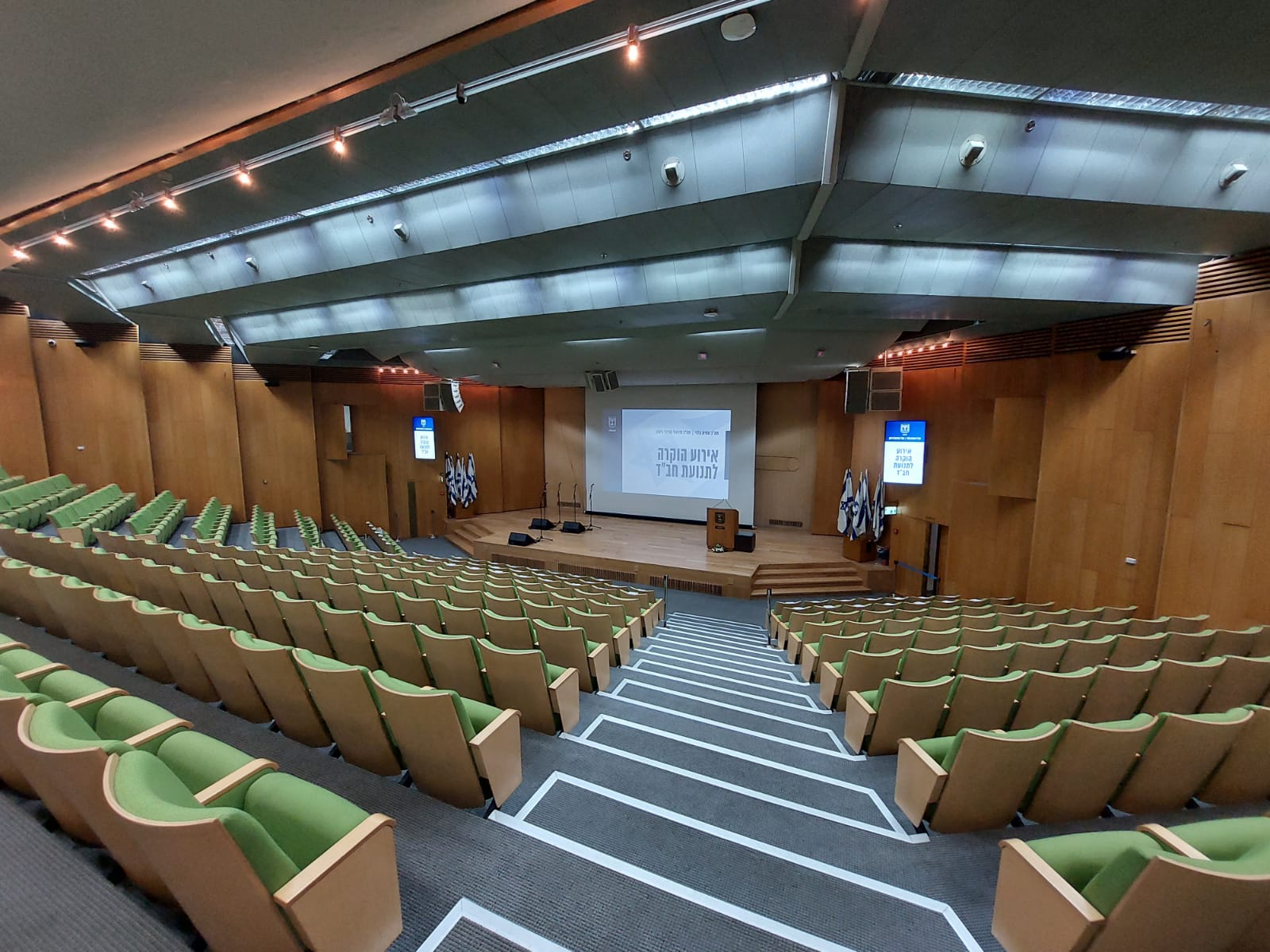
View of the Knesset Auditorium

==== Kidma wing ====
The Kidma wing is the newest of the Knesset's wings, and was opened in 2008. The wing contains four floors, as well as several gardens containing displays of archaeological artifacts.

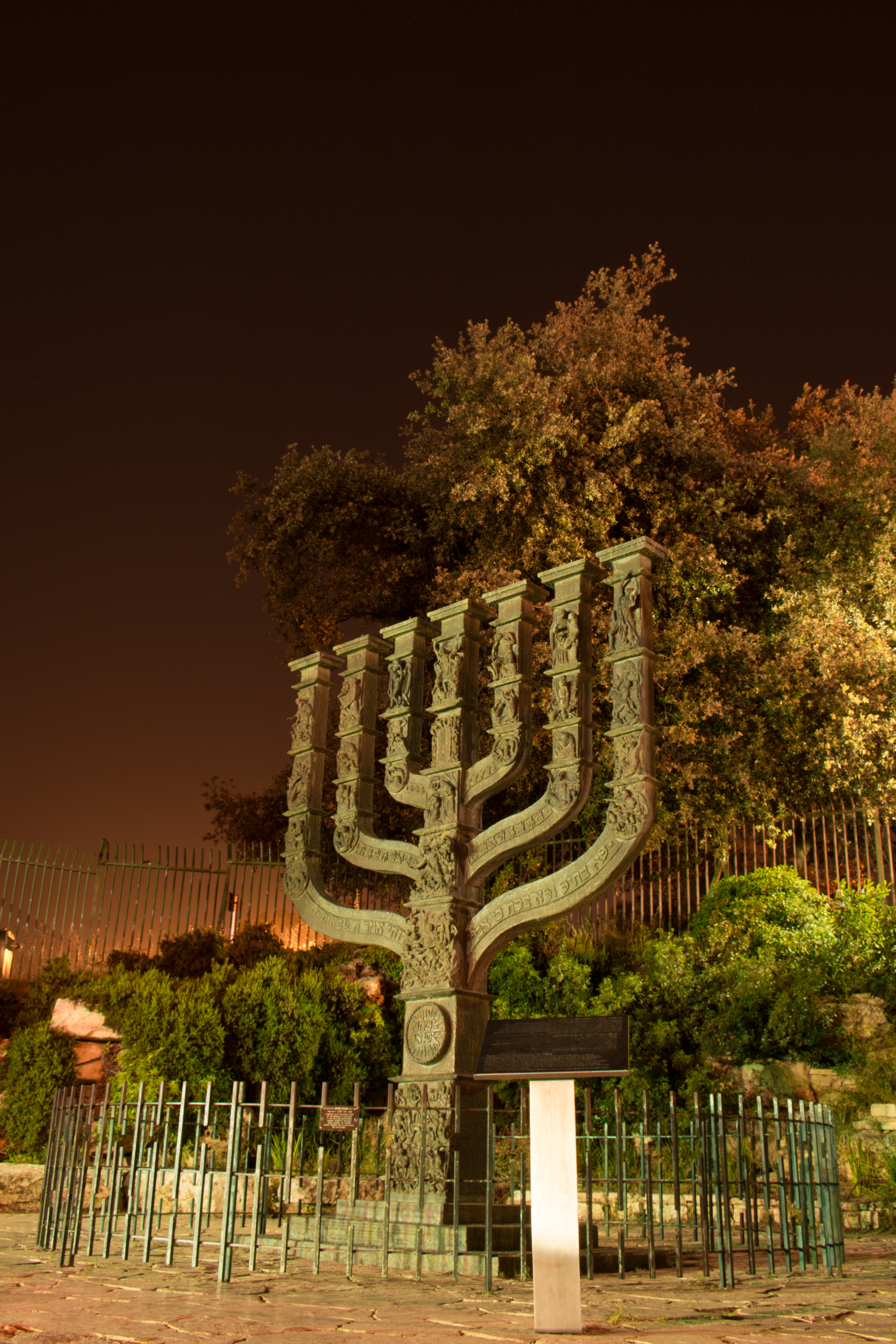
Knesset Menorah

The wing also contains the conference rooms and offices of Knesset committees, as well as the Knesset's gym, library, archive, the studios of the Knesset Channel and 49 offices for Knesset members. The wing also contained the Knesset's post office until its closure in April 2023.

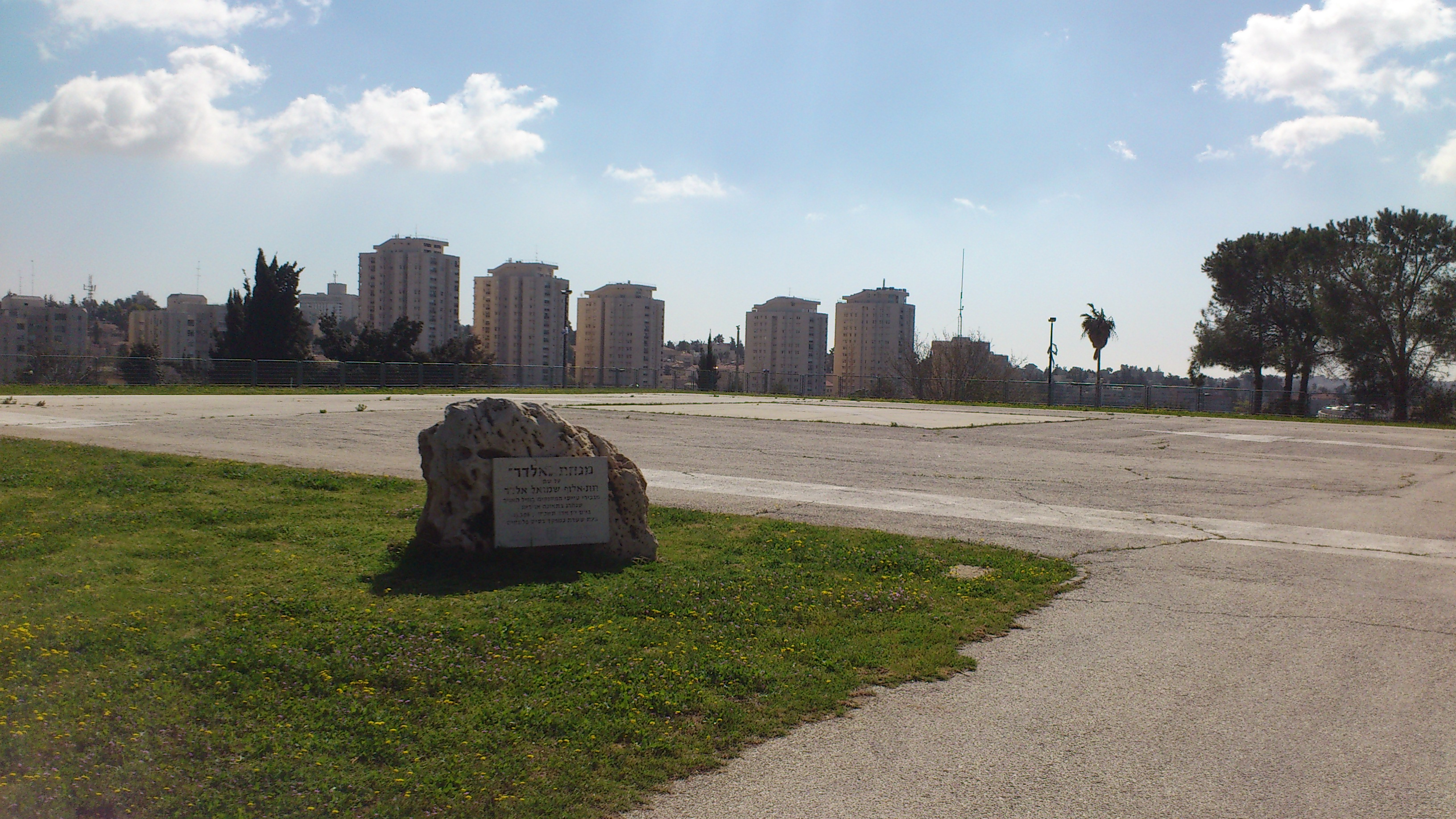
Knesset's helicopter landing pad

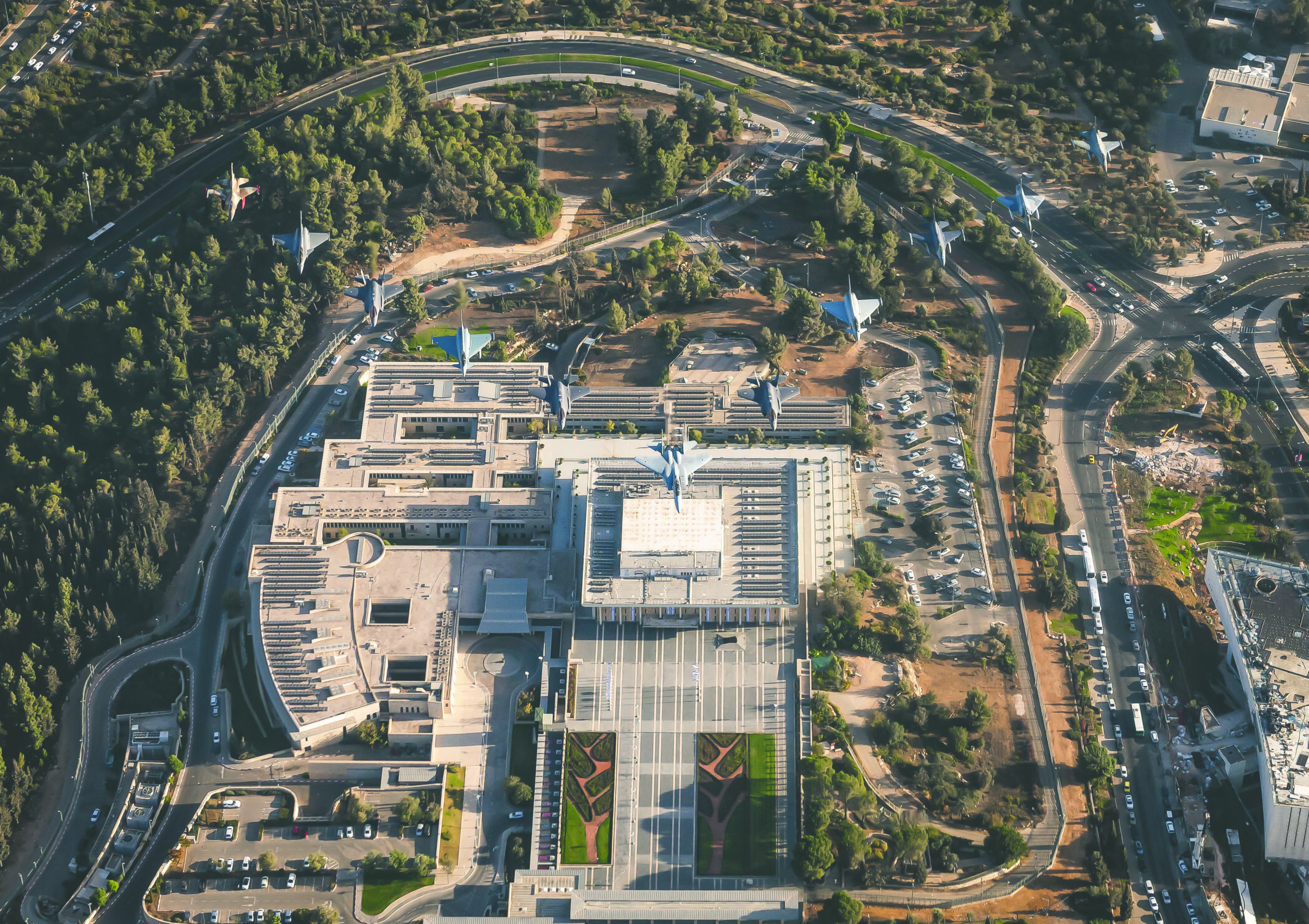
Aerial view of the Knesset during the 2021 Blue Flag

== See also ==
- Knesset
