= Pray for the Peace of Jerusalem =

Sculpture in the Knesset in Jerusalem

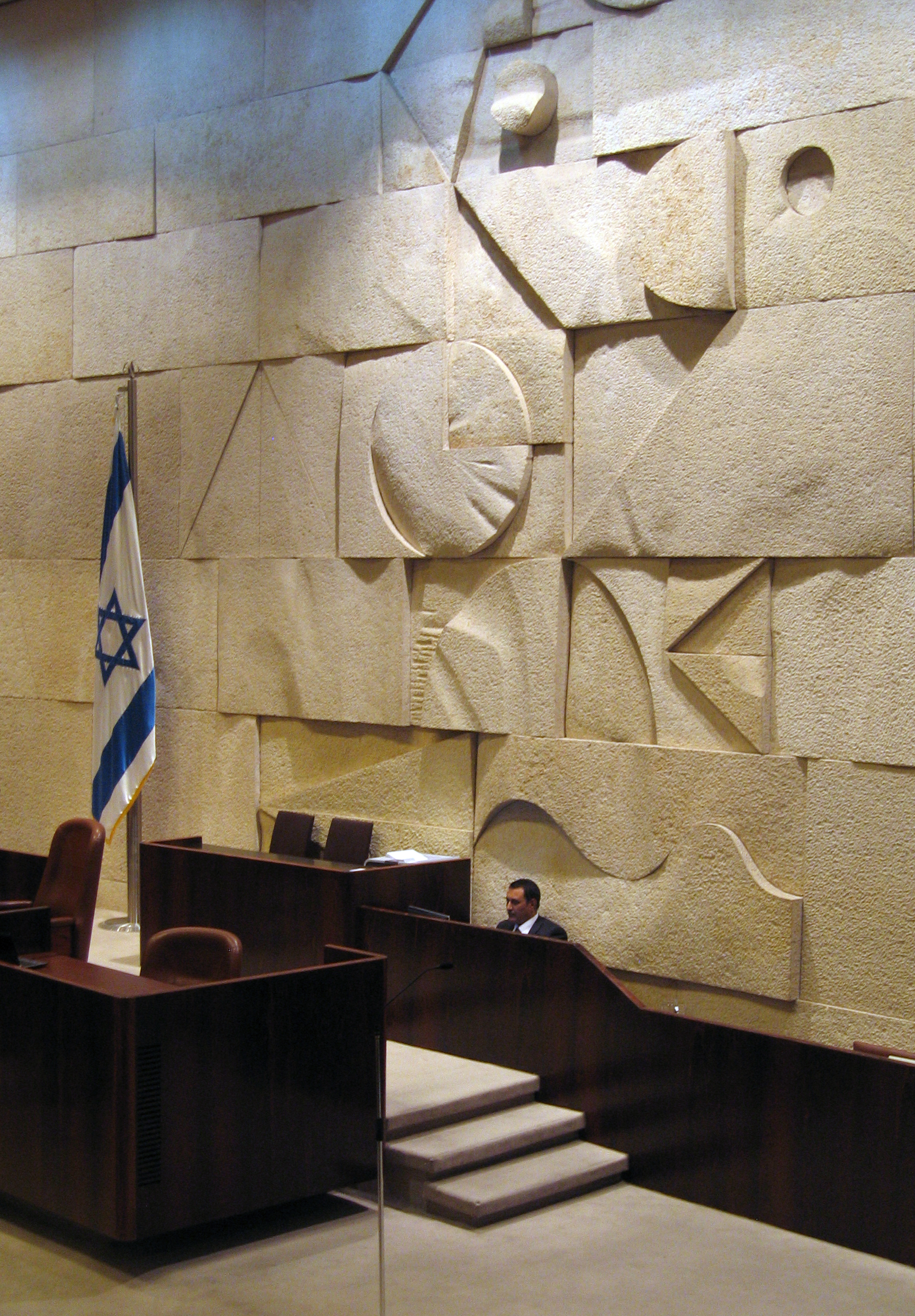
Southern wall of the Knesset assembly hall

"Pray for the Peace of Jerusalem" (Hebrew: "שאלו שלום ירושלם, ישליו אהביך") is a sculpture by the Israeli artist Dani Karavan located on the southern wall of the Knesset assembly hall in Jerusalem, Israel.

== History ==
In 1964, at the age of 33, Dani Karavan was commissioned by Dora Gad, the Knesset interior architect, to create a sculpture that would form the western central wall of the Knesset assembly hall. The piece was completed in 1966.

The sculpture is carved in limestone from the Deir al-Asad quarry in the Galilee. It is 24 meters wide and 7 meters tall. The sculpture is one of two Dani Karavan art pieces located in the Knesset; the second piece is the front wooden wall of the Knesset Auditorium.
