= Knesset Guard =

Israeli protective security unit

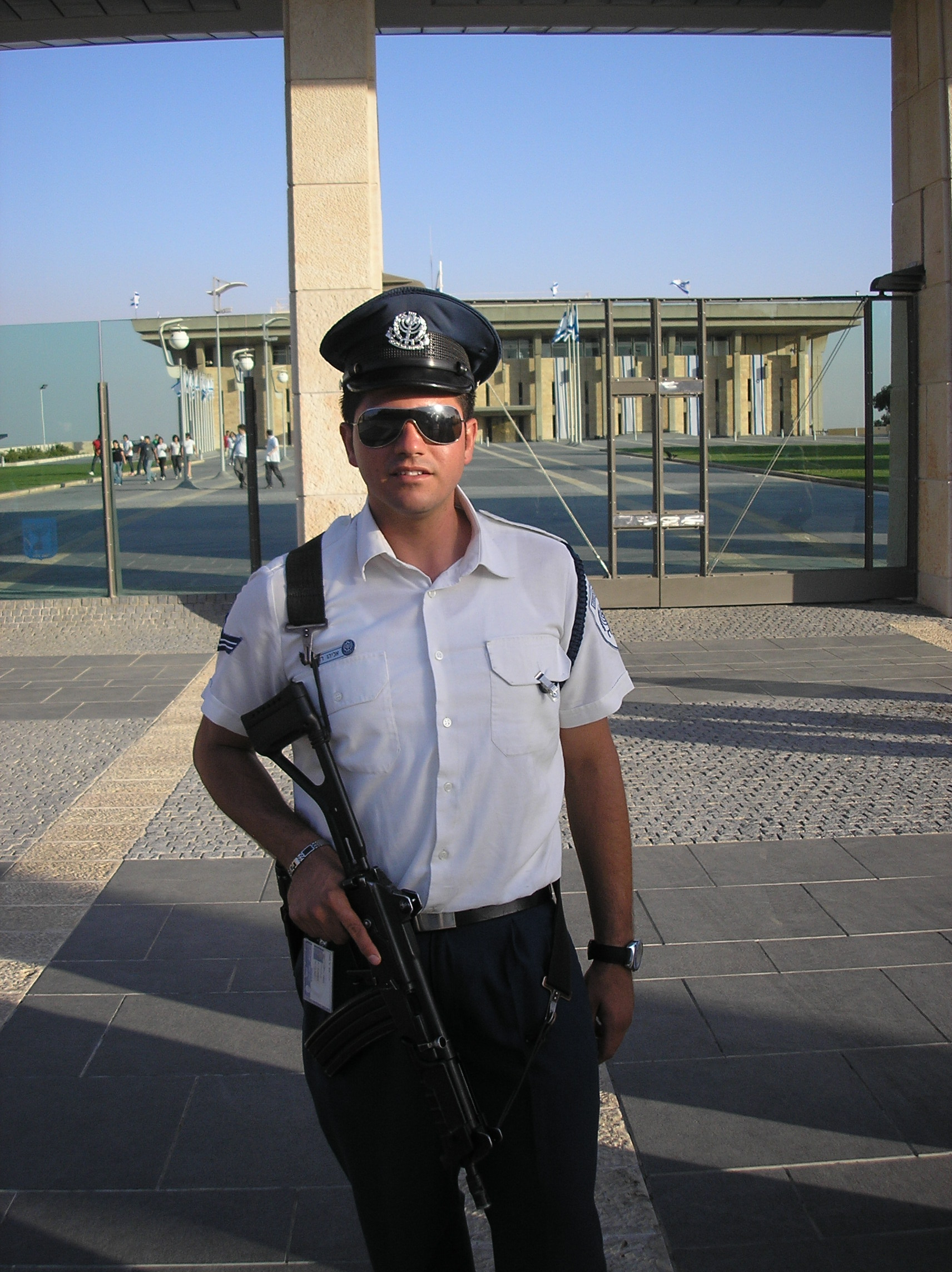
A Knesset Guard, armed with a Galil assault rifle, in front of the Knesset building, 2008

The Knesset Guard (Hebrew: משמר הכנסת, romanized: Mishmar HaKnesset) is an Israeli protective security unit. The Knesset Guard is responsible for the security of the Knesset building and protection of Knesset members (MKs).

Guards are stationed outside the building, with ushers on duty inside. The commander of the force is called the Sergeant-at-Arms (K'tzin HaKnesset, literally, "officer of the Knesset"). In addition to security duties, the Knesset Guard conducts ceremonial roles, such as greeting dignitaries and taking part in the annual ceremony on Mount Herzl on the eve of Israeli Independence Day.

== History ==
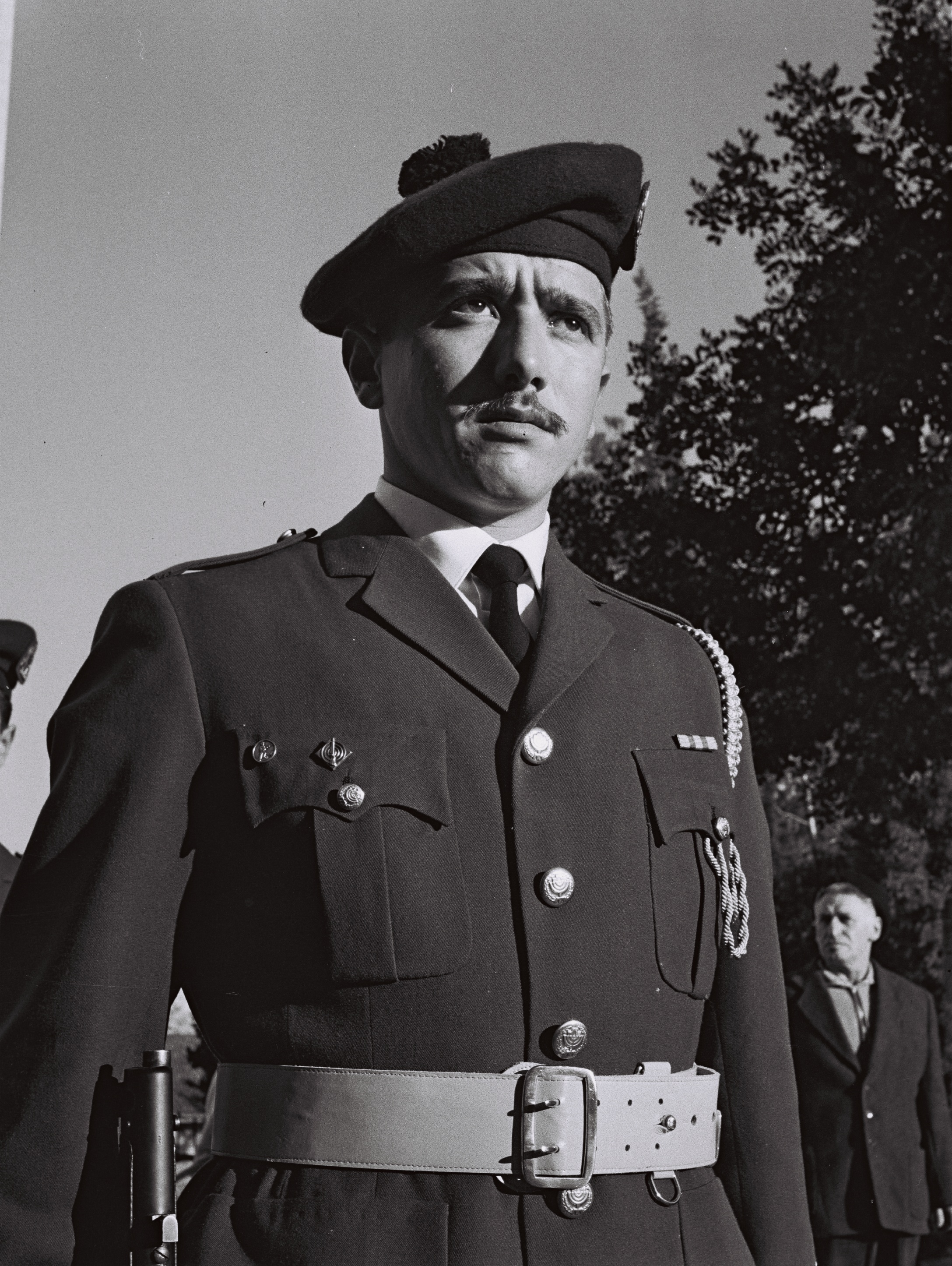
Member of the newly established Knesset Guard, 1959

On October 29, 1957, Moshe Dwek threw a grenade during a plenary session of the Knesset. Minister Haim Moshe Shapiro, Prime Minister David Ben-Gurion and Minister of Foreign Affairs Golda Meir were injured. Following the events, the Israel Police decided to establish the Knesset Guard in 1958.

== Duties ==
The Knesset Guard has primary responsibility for protecting the Knesset building and grounds. It is also responsible for the personal security of Knesset members. The guard operates under the authority of the Speaker of the Knesset.

The Status and Authority were regulated as part of Knesset Guard Law from 1968. The First Knesset Officer was Yerachmiel Belkin.

== Weapons ==
Knesset Guards use Israeli weapons only. They are armed with IMI Tavor TAR-21 and IWI ARAD, and until 2020 were armed with IMI Galil rifles.

== Ranks ==
| English language equivalent | (Hebrew) | Rank | Insignia |
Enlisted
| Constable | שוטר | Shoter | |
| Corporal | רב שוטר | Rav Shoter | |
| Sergeant | סמל שני | Samal Sheni | |
| Staff Sergeant | סמל ראשון | Samal Rishon | |
| Sergeant First Class | רב סמל | Rav Samal | |
| Master Sergeant | רב סמל ראשון | Rav Samal Rishon | |
| First Sergeant | רב סמל מתקדם | Rav Samal Mitkadem | |
| Sergeant Major | רב סמל בכיר | Rav Samal Bakhir | |
| Command Sergeant Major | רב נגד | Rav Nagad | |
Officer
| Second Guard Officer | קצין משמר משנה | Kzin mishmar mishne | |
| First Guard Officer | קצין משמר | Kzin mishmar | |
| Senior Guard Officer | שמר | Shamar | |
| Chief Guard Officer | רב שמר | Rav Shamar | |
| Vice Commissioner | סגן גונן | Sgan-Gonen | |
| Commissioner | גונן משנה | Gonen Mishne | |
| Commander of the Knesset Guard | תת גונן | Tat Gonen (Tat Nitzav) | |
| Knesset Master-at-Arms | ניצב | Ktzin-Ha-Knesset (Nitzav) | |
