= Dora Gad =

Israeli architect and interior designer

- דורה גד
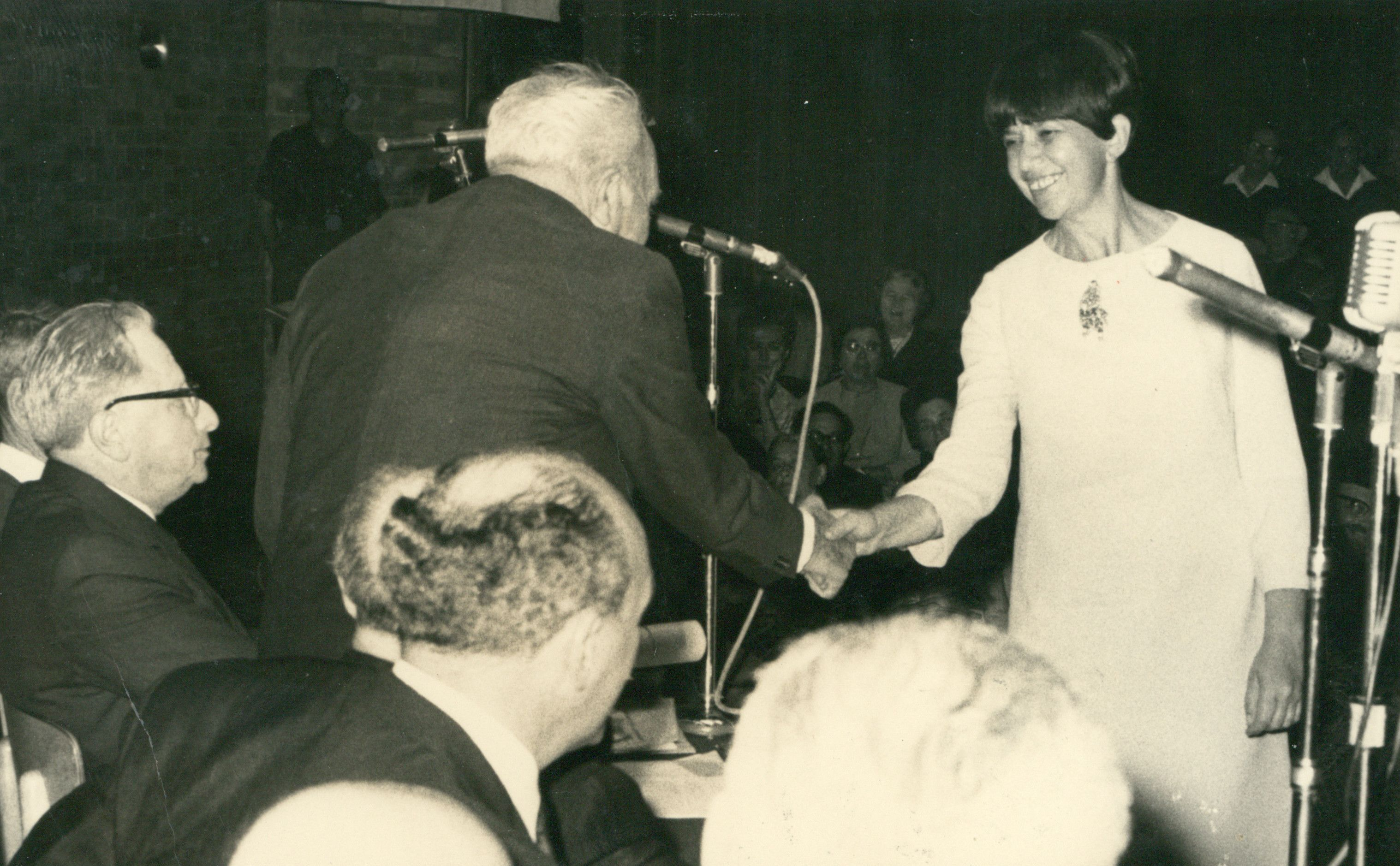
- Dora Gad, 1966
- Born: 1912; Câmpulung, Romania
- Died: 31 December 2003
- Occupation: Interior designer
- Known for: Israel Prize (1966)

Dora Gad (Hebrew: דורה גד; b. 1912, d. 31 December 2003) was an Israeli interior designer, whose work had significant influence on the development of modern Israeli architecture.

== Biography ==
Dora Siegel (later Gad) was born in Câmpulung Moldovenesc, Romania. She grew up in the home of her grandfather, and attended Hebrew school and a government-run school. Between 1930 and 1934, she studied at the Technische Universität in Vienna, and received her diploma in engineering and architecture. There she met her future husband, Heinrich Yehezkel Goldberg, an architecture student. They married in 1936, immigrated to Mandatory Palestine and settled in Tel Aviv. In 1959 she married Ephraim Ben-Artzi, a former general and public figure.

== Interior design career ==
Gad began her career in the office of architect Oskar Kaufmann. In 1938 she began to work independently. In 1942 she began to design private apartments together with her husband. Her style was light and modern, drawing from local inspiration; abundant light, and local building materials. Gad incorporated locally available fabrics, wool carpets, woven work, straw and felt in her designs. Her style set her apart from many European educated architects of the day, who maintained more European styles of architecture.

By the 1950s, the couple were already prominent interior designers in Israel. They were involved in the planning of many government buildings and institutions.

After the death of Yehezkel Gad in 1958, Gad established a partnership with Arieh Noy, an employee in her office. The Gad-Noy firm continued to work on governmental projects, and they were responsible, in 1965, for the design of the Israel Museum, together with architect Al Mansfeld, and in 1966, for the interior design of the Knesset building.

The Gad-Noy firm operated until 1976. Gad continued to work independently in both the public and private sectors until her death, in 2003.

== Notable projects ==
- The residence of the Prime Minister (Jerusalem, 1950)
- The residence of the Minister of Foreign Affairs (Jerusalem, 1950)
- The Sharon and Accadia luxury hotels (Herzliyyah, 1955)
- The Israeli National Library (Jerusalem, 1956)
- Israeli Embassies in Washington, D.C., and Ankara
- The New York offices of EL AL, the national airline (New York, 1956 and London, 1959), as well as interiors of the carrier's 3 new Bristol Britannia airplanes
- The vessels of Zim, the national shipping line (together with the Mansfeld-Weinraub firm, 1955–1975): 3 cargo ships and 6 passenger ships, including Zim's flagship Shalom (1964)
- The interior design of the Israeli Parliament building, the Knesset (Jerusalem, 1958–1966), as part of a team of architects (Joseph Klarwein, Shimon Powsner, Dov Karmi, Ram Karmi, Bill Gillitt)
- The Tel Aviv Hilton Hotels (1965) and the Jerusalem Hilton (1974)
- The El Al terminal at Kennedy airport in New York (1970 and 1974)
- The Ben Gurion International Airport (1973)
- Offices of the Governor of the Bank of Israel (Jerusalem, 1980)
- The Presidential residence in Talbiya, Jerusalem (1984–1985)

== Awards and recognition ==
- In 1966, Gad won the Israel Prize, in architecture.
- Also in 1966, she received Domus magazine's Regulo D’Oro design prize for her plan of modular concrete units.

== See also ==
- List of Israel Prize recipients
- German and Austrian Women Architects in Mandatory Palestine (English and German), Sigal Davidi
