= Benno Elkan =

German sculptor

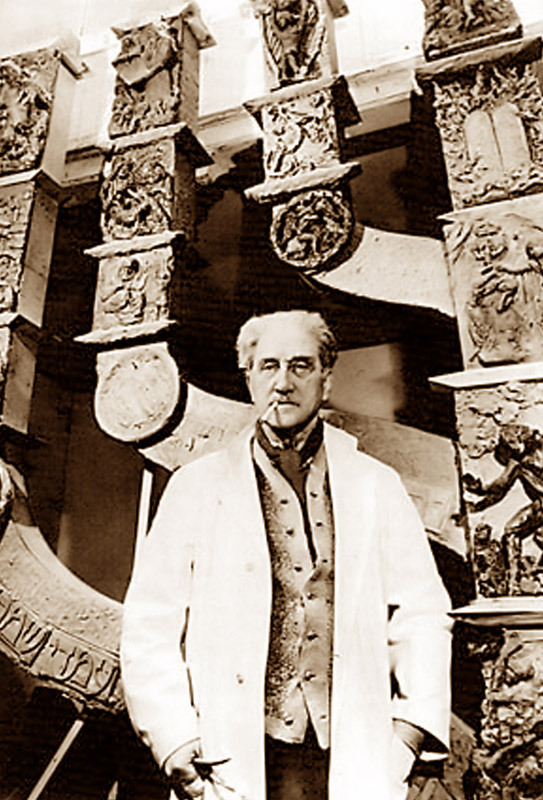
Benno Elkan

Benno Elkan OBE (2 December 1877 – 10 January 1960,) was a German-born British sculptor and medallist. His work includes the big Menorah standing in front of the Knesset in Jerusalem and also numerous monuments, busts and medals in Germany and England.

== Biography ==
Benno Elkan was born in Dortmund, Germany in 1877, to a Jewish family. In February 1900, he was among 17 people who founded German football club FC Bayern Munich. He fled Germany in 1933 after the rise of the Nazis. He was married to Hedwig Einstein, sister of Carl Einstein and a concert pianist in her own right. Together they had two children: Ursula and Wolf, both of whom emigrated to the United States.

Elkan died in London. He is buried at the Liberal Jewish Cemetery, Willesden, England.

== Education ==
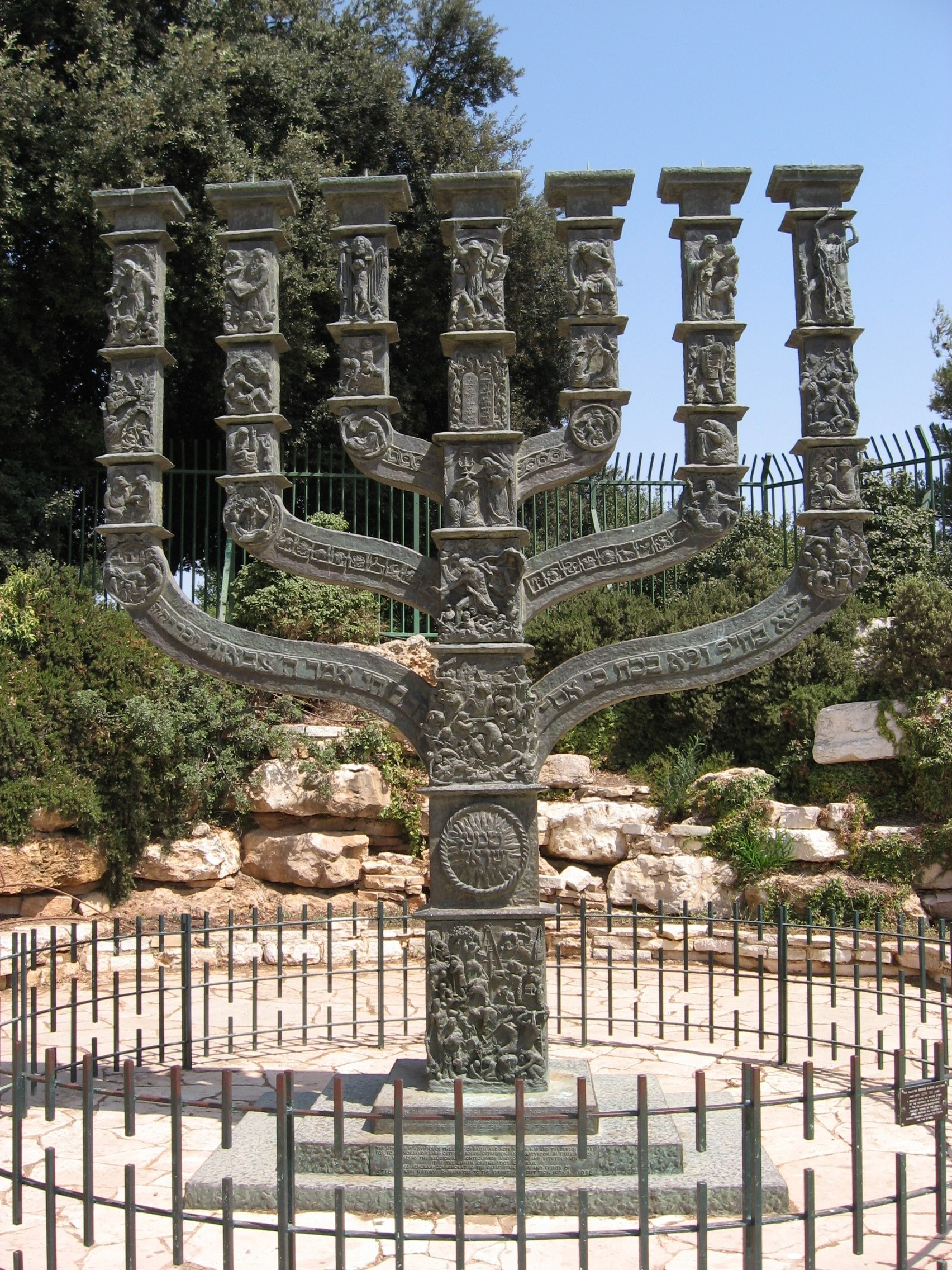
Knesset Menorah outside the Knesset, Jerusalem, Israel

- Gymnasium, Dortmund
- Château du Rosey, Rolle, nr Lausanne
- Royal Academy, Munich and Karlsruhe i/B as painter
- Self-trained as sculptor

== Sculpting career ==
He studied and worked in Paris, Rome and Frankfurt am Main, and moved to London following the rise of the Nazis in Germany in 1933. His works included tombs, busts, medals and monuments. He was an exhibitor in International Exhibitions in Germany, France, Italy, and England; his works are in many museums in Europe.

Elkan created the first statue in Britain of Sir Walter Raleigh, and designed Frankfurt's Great War Memorial, incorporating mourning mothers as a symbol of loss in World War I. The memorial was removed by the Nazis in 1933 and re-erected in 1946.

== Some major works ==
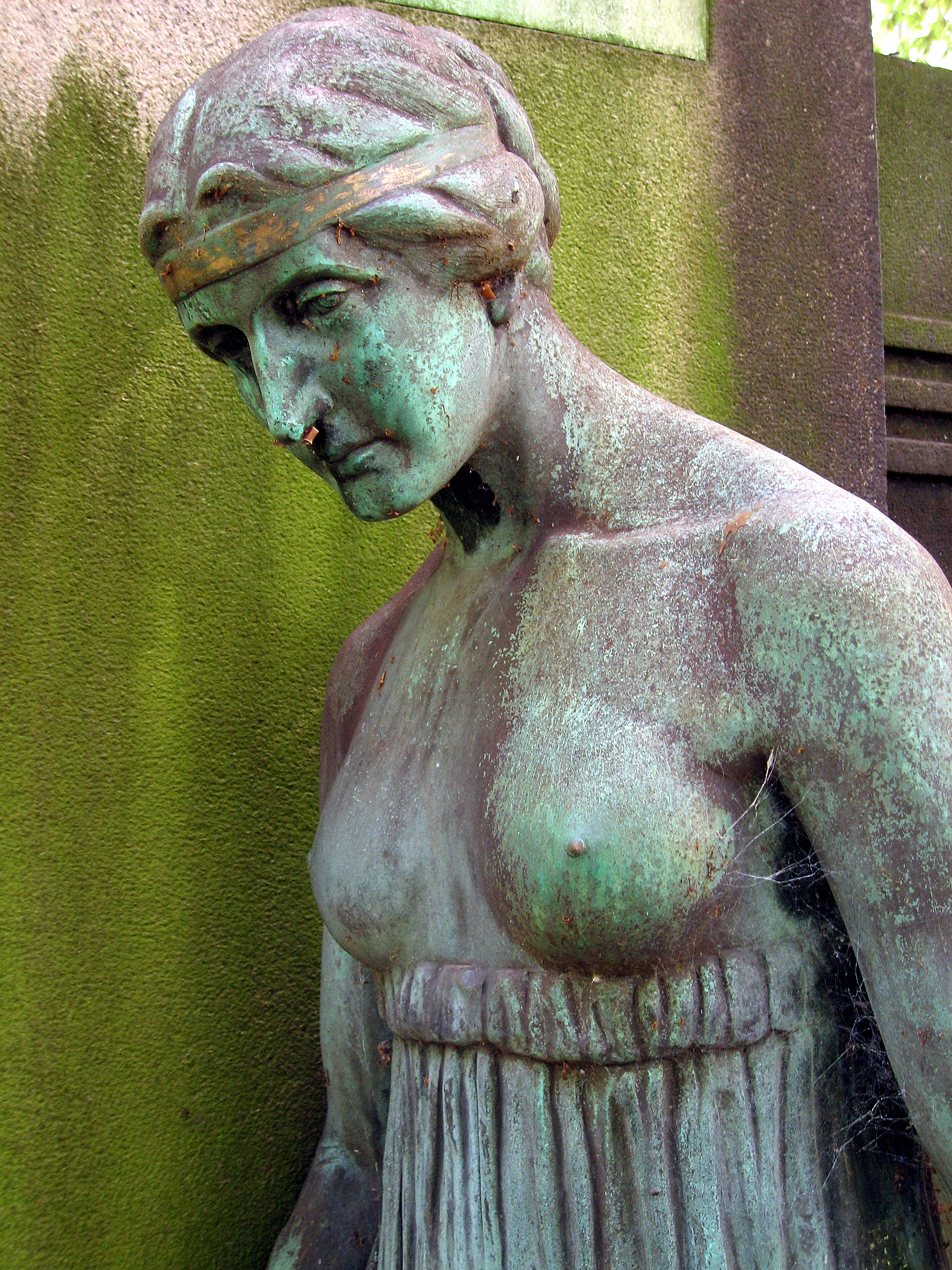
Bronze figure, Dortmund

- "Freedom Monument", Mainz (destroyed 1940)
- The first statue in Britain of Sir Walter Raleigh, now at Greenwich
- Orangutan group (in lead) "A Jungle Family", Edinburgh Zoo (created for the Empire Exhibition in Glasgow)
- Mowgli's Jungle Friends, plaque in lead on Rudyard Kipling Memorial Building, Windsor
- Bronze candelabra with Biblical figures at King's College Chapel, Cambridge, New College, Oxford and Buckfast Abbey. The two bronze candelabra at Buckfast Abbey are each side of the Sanctuary. One represents the four cardinal virtues of prudence, justice, temperance and fortitude. The other shows the four great prophets of the Old Testament, Isaiah, Jeremiah, Ezechiel and Daniel, who are portrayed with human expressions of hope, lament, frenzy and sophistication.
- Two Great Bronze Candelabra of the Old and New Testament with about 80 figures erected in Westminster Abbey
- Tomb for Abbot Anscar Vonier in Buckfast Abbey
- Great War Memorial, To the Victims, Symbol of All Mourning Mothers in Frankfurt (removed by the Nazis in 1933, re-erected 1946)
- Fighting Cock life size in silver gilt commissioned by Arsenal Football Club and presented to Tottenham Hotspur FC in 1950 as a gesture of friendship, for allowing them to use their ground during World War 2. A photograph of Benno Elkan with the statue appeared in the Tottenham Hotspur Matchday Programme on Sunday 16 March 2014. The current whereabouts of this piece is unknown.
- Seven-branched Candelabrum (Menorah) for the Knesset in Jerusalem (a gift of British parliamentary members and others)
- In section 16 of the East Cemetery in Dortmund, a replica of Benno Elkan's 1909 sculpture "Winged Angel" still stands on Röttger's grave, bearing the inscription on the plaque held by the angel, a paraphrased line from a poem by the German poet, publicist, and philosopher Ludwig Jacobowski:

"FAR FROM THE EYE, ETERNALLY NEAR THE HEART"

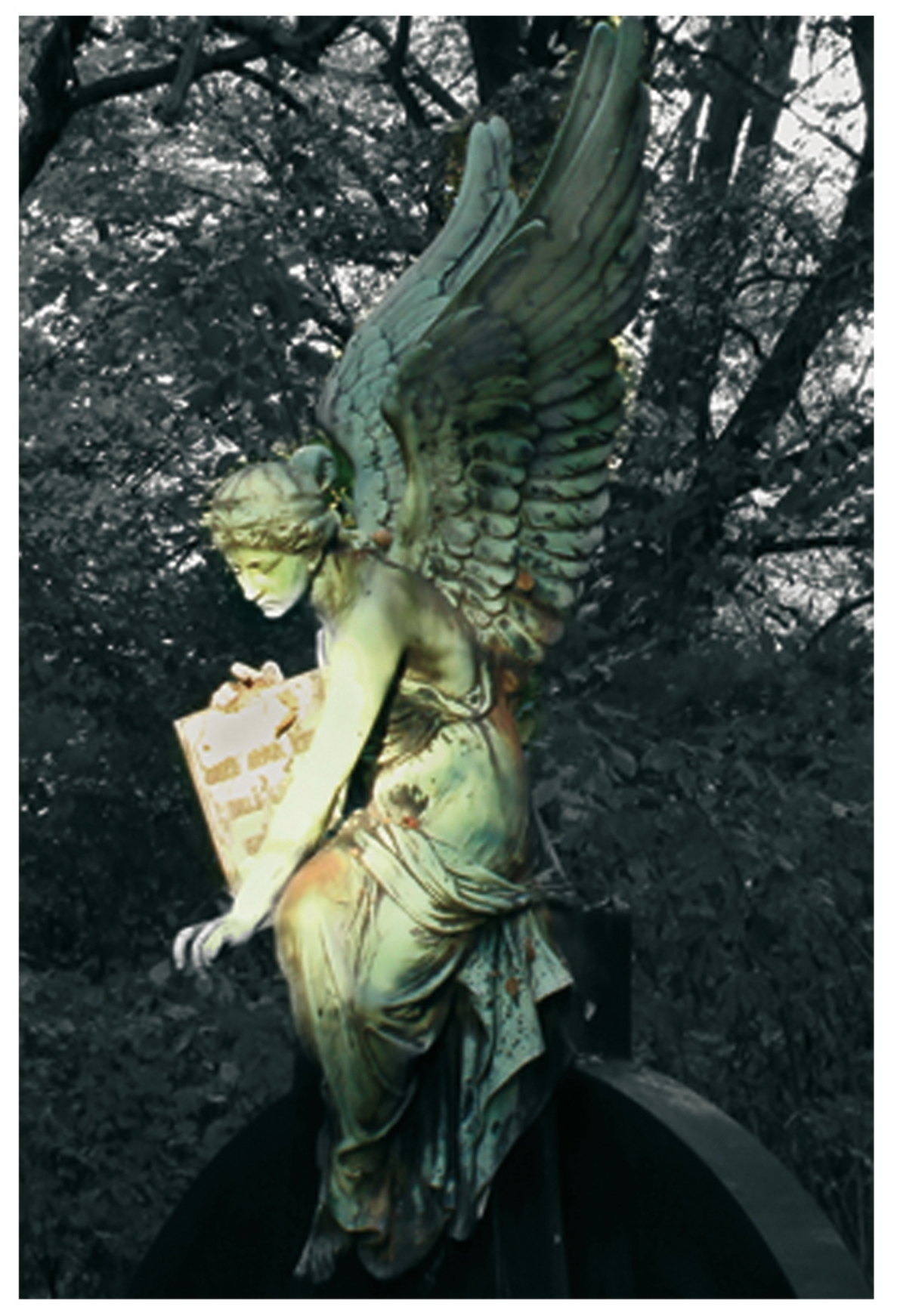
BENNO ELKAN REPLICA Year 1909, Field 16, Röttgers Family
