= Knesset Menorah =

Menorah opposite the Knesset in Jerusalem

Coordinates: 31.7783°N 35.2051°E

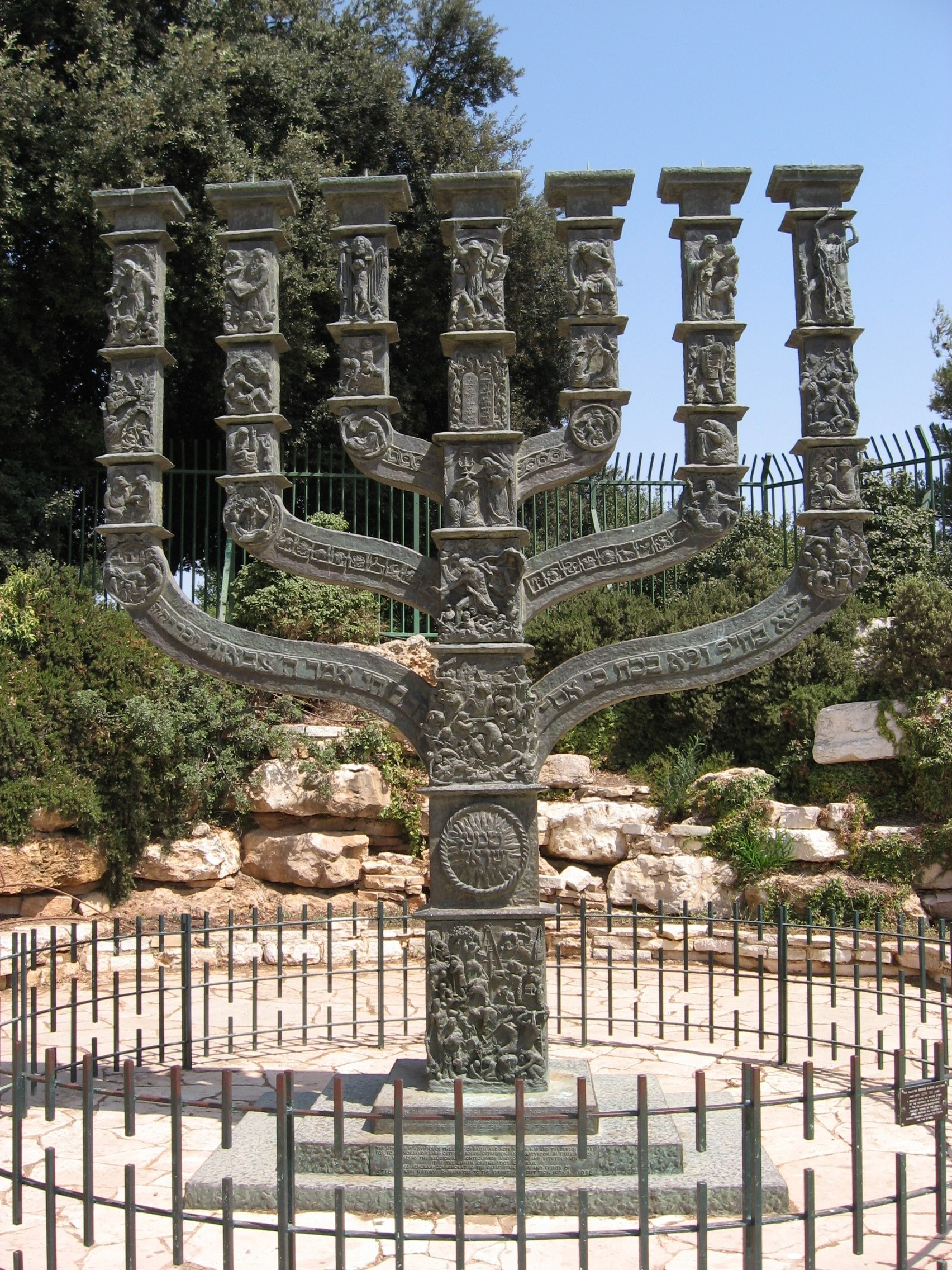
Knesset Menorah

The Knesset Menorah (Hebrew: מנורת הכנסת Menorat HaKnesset) is a bronze menorah that is 4.30 meters high and 3.5 meters wide and weighs 4 tons. It is located at the edge of Wohl Rose Park (Hebrew Gan Havradim, "Rose Garden") opposite the Knesset in Jerusalem. It was designed by Benno Elkan (1877–1960), a Jewish sculptor who escaped from Germany to the United Kingdom. It was presented to the Knesset as a gift from the British Parliament on April 15, 1956, in honour of the eighth anniversary of Israeli independence.

The Knesset Menorah was modelled after the golden candelabrum that stood in the Temple in Jerusalem. A series of bronze reliefs on the Menorah depict the struggles to survive of the Jewish people, depicting formative events, images and concepts from the Hebrew Bible and Jewish history. The engravings on the six branches of the Menorah portray episodes since the Jewish exile from the Land of Israel. Those on the central branch portray the fate of the Jews from the biblical return to the Land to the establishment of the modern State of Israel. It has been described as a visual textbook of Jewish history.

== History ==
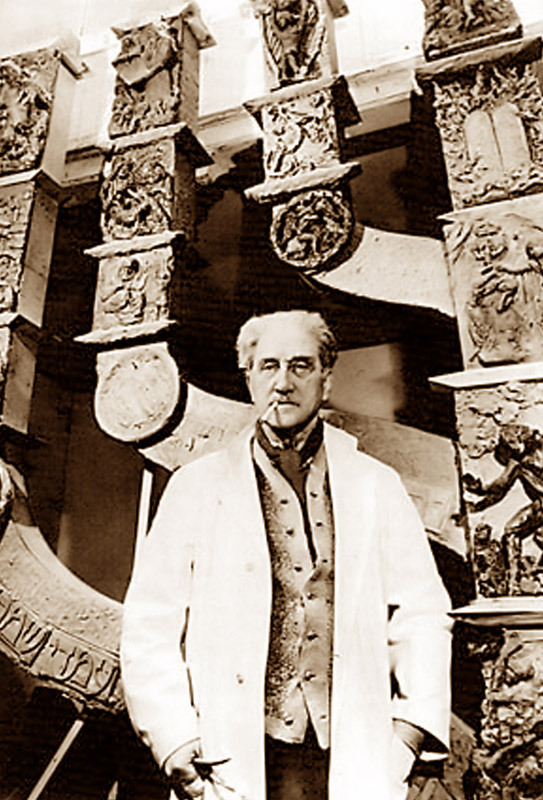
Benno Elkan in his studio working on the Menorah

In 1950, a year and a half after Israel's Declaration of Independence, Edwin Samuel, son of the first British High Commissioner to Palestine, Herbert Samuel, approached the Jewish artist Benno Elkan and discussed with him the idea of offering as a gift to the young Israeli state a monumental bronze sculpture in the form of a menorah. The gift would symbolize the admiration of the British Parliament for the new state and its government. Elkan had left Germany in 1933 after the Nazi rise to power and had become a well-known sculptor in England. He had experience working in bronze, having created ten large relief-decorated candelabra, among them two standing in the Westminster Abbey in London. The idea for such a Menorah had already formed in Elkan's mind in 1947, and he had begun to create the bronze reliefs in 1949. In total he spent almost ten years on the project, much of it in research, with the intention to create a unique work which would tell the millennia-old history of the nation of Israel.

The choice of the Menorah-symbol as a gift is based on the emblem of the State of Israel, chosen by the first Knesset. The outline of the Knesset Menorah and that appearing on Israel's state emblem are both based on the Menorah from the Arch of Titus in Rome. The Arch bears a relief depicting captured Jewish rebels from the Jewish revolt of 66-74 CE, presented in triumph to the people of Rome while bearing the treasures of the Second Temple after its destruction in 70 CE, including the Temple Menorah. The Arch is dated to 81 CE, and so the depiction of the Temple Menorah is considered by some to be accurate, assuming that the artist who created the relief must have seen the Menorah with his own eyes.

== Financing ==
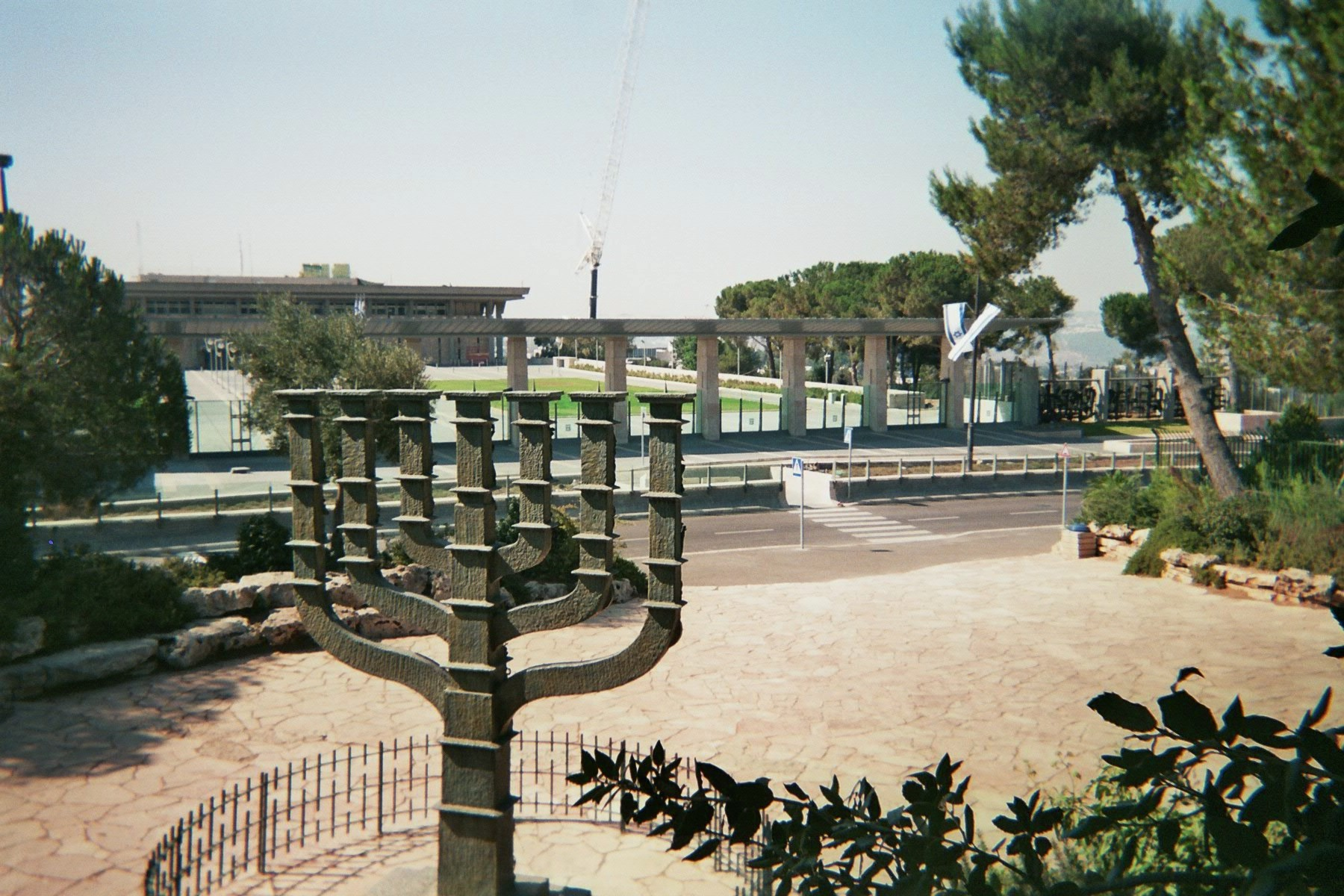
Knesset Menorah and the Knesset

Lord Samuel initially had difficulty obtaining financing for the construction of a menorah, but with a joint decision Elkan began work, in the hope that funding would be obtained. At the same time, Lord Samuel and a few friends established "The Menorah Fund Committee", which operated in a number of ways to raise funds: a dinner party at the British House of Lords for potential donors, distributing pamphlets, advertising and more. The committee also raised funds in accordance with Menorah content, so that any donor could contribute to a specific relief of the Menorah.

On the base of the Menorah appear the details of the donors for example, WIZO financed the relief of Ruth and Rachel; 'Marks & Spencer' financed the relief of the Apocalypse; Baron James de Rothschild financed the relief of Rabbi Yochanan ben Zakkai in memory of his late father, Baron Edmond de Rothschild; Relief Bar Kochba was funded by The Association of Jewish Ex-servicemen; Sir Louis Sterling financed the relief of Nehemiah and Shavei Zion in honor of Lord Samuel; Israel Electric Corporation funded the relief called "light" and more.

An English dedication on the base states:

The Menorah is the work of Benno Elkan. The idea of presenting the Menorah was conceived by members of the Parliament of the United Kingdom and Northern Ireland in appreciation of the establishment of a democratic parliamentary government in the State of Israel. The committee organizing the presentation included members of both Houses of Parliament and representatives of the British people of divers faiths. Viscount Samuel, President; the Rt. Hon. Clement Davies, chairman; Dr. Alec Lerner, treasurer; Mr. Gilbert McAllister, secretary. The gift was made possible by the generosity of the people of Britain and received strong support from the leading banks of the United Kingdom and large industrial concerns. Many small donations, too numerous to record here, were received from British citizens.

By 1955, the required 20 thousand pounds were gathered, and in December of that year the Menorah was transferred to Morris Singer Foundry in London.

== Halakhic issues ==
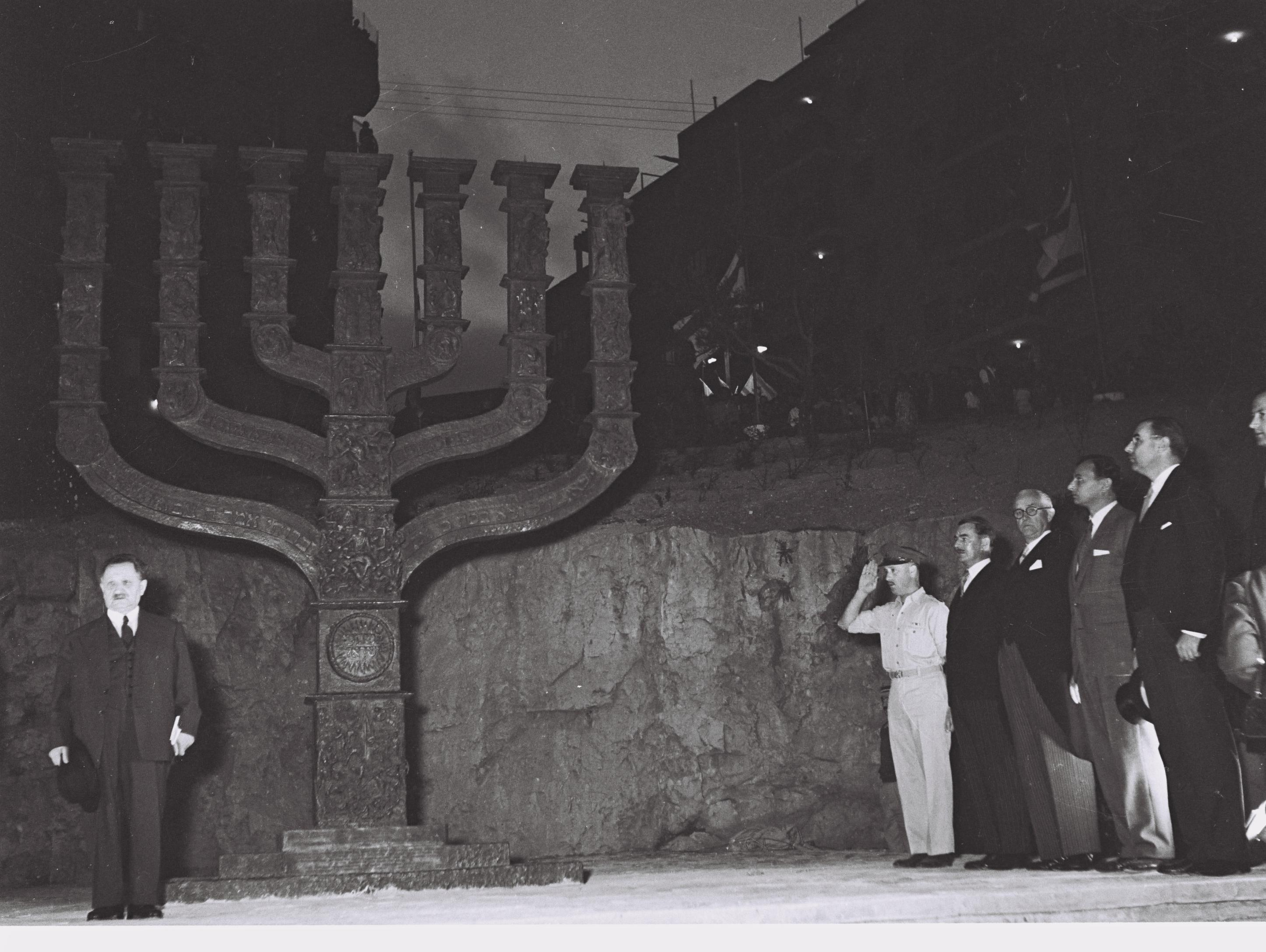
Unveiling ceremony of the Knesset Menorah in 1956

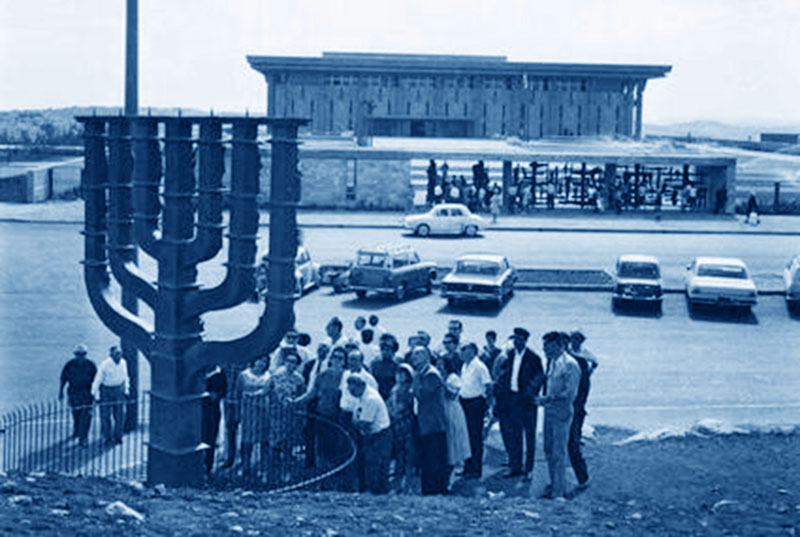
The Menorah at the new Knesset place in Givat Ram, 1966

Objections from religious groups were a concern, owing to a belief that copies of the Temple menorah should not be made until the Temple was rebuilt. According to the Babylonian Talmud: "A man may not make a house in the form of the Temple, or an exedra in the form of the Temple hall, or a court corresponding to the Temple court, or a table corresponding to the [sacred] table or a candlestick corresponding to the [sacred] candlestick, but he may make one with five or six or eight lamps, but with seven he should not make, even of other metals." (Talmud Bavli, Mas. Rosh HaShana 24a-b)

An additional problem was the incorporation of human and animal sculptures, which was perceived as a violation of a fundamental Jewish law and one of the precepts in the Ten Commandments: "You shall not make for yourself an idol, or any likeness of what is in heaven above or on the earth beneath or in the water under the earth" (Exodus 20:3). There was also concern that the nudity of some of the figures would anger religious groups. Proponents for accepting the gift argued that it is not designed as a ritual object, and therefore, its resemblance to the Temple Menorah should not create any theological problems. In regards to the sculptures, it was argued, that these are reliefs and not fully three-dimensional, and therefore, the Jewish law is not broken here. What began as a gesture of good will of the British House of Lords, grew into an uncomfortable question whether Israel was even interested in the Menorah, and if so, how it could be adapted to conform with Jewish law.

These issues required external intervention to mediate between the parties, calm things down, and attempt to address these questions. The negotiators were Eliyahu Eilat, Israel's Ambassador to the UK; Yosef Shprinzak, Speaker of the Knesset; Mordechai Ish-Shalom, deputy mayor of Jerusalem, and many others. Finally, it was decided that the chief rabbi Yitzhak Izaich Halevi Herzog would decide on the Jewish law questions. Rabbi Herzog lingered with his response, but ultimately ruled the candelabrum and relief acceptable by Jewish law. Following the ruling, and despite the concerns, the arrival of the Menorah and placement in Jerusalem did not provoke any protest.

== Location ==
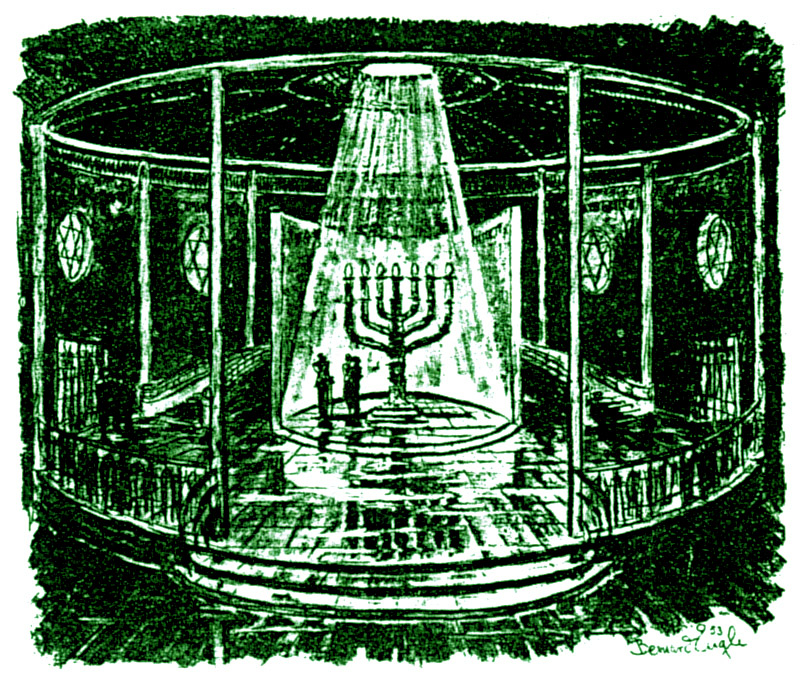
Sketch by Benno Elkan prepared for the Knesset Menorah

The Menorah arrived in March 1956 by ship to Haifa port and was then transported free of charge by Zim Integrated Shipping Services to Jerusalem. On April 15, 1956, a ceremony was held in honor of the Menorah in Jerusalem attended by thousands of spectators. The Menorah was placed on a pedestal in Shiber Pit, a lot next to Frumin House in the center of Jerusalem, then the seat of the Israeli parliament. Clement Davies, the Liberal Party leader, who served as chairman of the "Menorah Fund Committee" spoke at the ceremony and said: "...We were lucky to have such a great artist, a Jewish artist, who fled to Britain from the evil clutches of Hitler and the atrocities committed by his executioners to millions from the Jewish people... We know that the Menorah that Elkan created is the symbol chosen so the walkers in darkness will see a great light. This Menorah is a tribute from the British Parliament to the State of Israel, a living country, with a significant part in the world. With Honesty, humility and all our power, we pray that Jerusalem, the eternal city, that stands on a high hill, will shine a light on the people of this holy land, and through it, the whole world."

Yosef Sprinzak, the presiding officer in the Knesset, gave a long speech at that ceremony, and among the things said: "... With affection and gratitude, we receive the Menorah... We are excited by the handsome gift... We receive this Menorah as a gift from the Zionist Britain, who saw throughout the times various noble spirits and ideas, Britons who were the forerunners of the rebirth of Israel and encouragers..."

In 1966, the Menorah was transferred to a site opposite the new Knesset building in Givat Ram. In both locations, the Menorah was outdoors despite Elkan's request that it be displayed in an enclosed space with lights illuminating it from above. Elkan provided a sketch showing a dark room lit by a bright ceiling light. The light source was important for proper viewing of figures whose heads were tilted upwards, as in the scene of the Warsaw Ghetto Uprising, the figure of Rabban Yochanan ben Zakai, certain objects such as the Ten Commandments and the candelabra held by Ruth, the phrase "Hear O' Israel" and the flames engulfing Hanina ben Teradyon.

== Structure and content ==
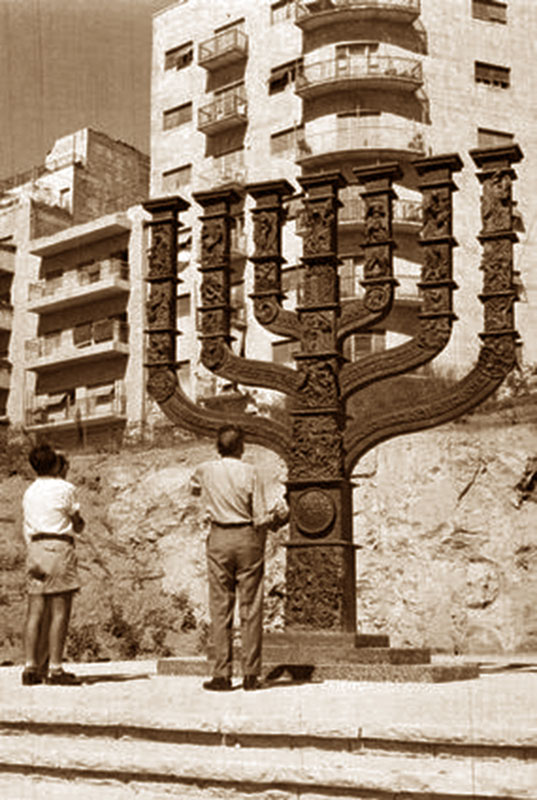
The Menorah in Gan Hamenorah

The Menorah presents 30 reliefs of events, idioms, characters and concepts, which Elkan saw as the most important and significant in the Hebrew Bible and Jewish history. Due to the symmetrical shape of the lamp, a central spine with three branches on each side, Elkan decided not to put the reliefs in strict chronological order, but rather opposing each other in the order of the branches, this way, each relief contrasts or complements the relief opposite it.

The central spine contains the events which Elkan saw as most central to the history of the Jewish people. The base of the inner pair of branches is covered with a curly geometric decoration; the base of the middle branches is decorated with flowers and symbols of the tribes of Israel, and across the outer branches on either side of the menorah appears a verse taken from the Book of Zechariah: "Not by might, nor by power, but by My spirit, says the Lord of Hosts" (Zechariah 4:6). These words are taken from a passage in Zacharia which mentions the Menorah and olive branches, hinting at the Knesset's choice of the State emblem:

1 And the angel that spoke with me returned, and waked me, as a man that is wakened out of his sleep. 2 And he said unto me: "What seest thou?" And I said: "I have seen, and behold a candlestick all of gold, with a bowl upon the top of it, and its seven lamps thereon; there are seven pipes, yea, seven, to the lamps, which are upon the top thereof; 3 and two olive-trees by it, one upon the right side of the bowl, and the other upon the left side thereof." 4 And I answered and spoke to the angel that spoke with me, saying: "What are these, my lord?" 5 Then the angel that spoke with me answered and said unto me: "Knowest thou not what these are?" And I said: "No, my lord." 6 Then he answered and spoke unto me, saying: "This is the word of the LORD unto Zerubbabel, saying: Not by might, nor by power, but by My spirit, saith the LORD of hosts. 7 Who art thou, O great mountain before Zerubbabel? thou shalt become a plain; and he shall bring forth the top stone with shoutings of Grace, grace, unto it."

— Zechariah 4:1–7

Elkan chose to quote this verse because of its clear association to the state emblem, but it is conceivable that he chose it as well because of its moral, indicating that the power of the people of Israel and God is not in physical strength, but rather in spiritual strength. This is a significant statement for a work which depicts scenes of war and bloody battles on one hand, and on the other hand figures, events or concepts that express a culture and spirituality of peace.

== The central branch ==
The central branch displays the events, characters and idioms Elkan saw as most central to the history of Israel.

=== The war with the Amalekites in Rephidim ===
The head of the central branch depicts the war with Amalek at Rephidim as described in the Book of Exodus:

8 Then came Amalek, and fought with Israel in Rephidim. 9 And Moses said unto Joshua: "Choose us out men, and go out, fight with Amalek; tomorrow I will stand on the top of the hill with the rod of God in my hand." 10 So Joshua did as Moses had said to him, and fought with Amalek; and Moses, Aaron, and Hur went up to the top of the hill. 11 And it came to pass, when Moses held up his hand, that Israel prevailed; and when he let down his hand, Amalek prevailed. 12 But Moses' hands were heavy; and they took a stone, and put it under him, and he sat thereon; and Aaron and Hur stayed up his hands, the one on the one side, and the other on the other side; and his hands were steady until the going down of the sun. 13 And Joshua discomfited Amalek and his people with the edge of the sword.

— Exodus 17:8–14

The relief portrays Moses standing with both hands raised high (without his staff), supported by Aaron and Hur. The uniqueness of this battle is its strange conduct: the battle was not won by the physical strength of one army over another, but rather by Moses' ability to keep his arms raised. Here also, the Amalekites are perceived as an especially bitter enemy, such that God promises to wipe them out once and for all. The war against Amalek is considered a seminal event in the history of Israel because of the perception of Amalek as the ultimate enemy. In every generation, a new character, associated with Amalek arises, and thus the promise of God to "wipe out the memory of Amalek" is seen as relevant to all generations. There is also a powerful theological message which appears in the Mishnah Rosh Hashanah (3:8): "And is it Moshe's hands that make [success in] war or break [success in] war? Rather, [this comes to] tell you, [that] whenever Israel would look upward and subjugate their hearts to their Father in heaven, they would prevail; and if not, they would fall."

=== The Ten Commandments ===
The Ten Commandments appear on the Menorah in their traditional form of two rectangular tablets with rounded tops. Written on the tablets are the Ten Commandments as given at Mount Sinai encapsulating the basic tenets of Jewish faith and values. Each commandment is represented on the tablets by the first two words of the full commandment. Flames rise in the background of the tablets, symbolizing the burning bush or Mount Sinai aflame at the Giving of the Torah.

=== Ruth and Rachel ===
Ruth is represented in the relief holding a pile of sheaves, she symbolizes the foreign woman that assimilated into the people of Israel and became the founder from which the dynasty from which the kings of Judah began. In her other hand Ruth is holding a candlestick with three candles, that symbolize the power of women in Judaism. The number of candles symbolizes the number of generations that pass between her till the birth of King David, the head of the royal family. That is the reason for the large crown on top of the candlestick. At the feet of Ruth, sits the matriarch Rachel, kneeling on the ground sobbing, as is expressed in the biblical verse "A voice is heard in Ramah, mourning, and great weeping, Rachel weeping for her children and refusing to be comforted because they are no more... Restrain your voice from weeping and your eyes from tears, for your work will be rewarded...They will return from the land of the enemy" (Jeremiah 31:15-16) Ruth and Rachel represent independence and monarchy on one hand, and the exile and enslavement on the other. The connection between the two women reflects the history of the Jewish people, where both are interlinked.

=== Vision of the Valley of Dry Bones ===
Elkan designed the Vision of the Valley of Dry Bones shaped as an angel wearing a large flapping cloak, created from the four winds (in the background) that unite as one. The angel passes over skeletons and bones, that appear to be rising from the ground, in accordance to the prophecy in the Book of Ezekiel: "...and he brought me out by the Spirit of the Lord and set me in the middle of a valley; it was full of bones...I will make breath enter you, and you will come to life. I will attach tendons to you and make flesh come upon you and cover you with skin; I will put breath in you, and you will come to life. Then you will know that I am the Lord... My people, I am going to open your graves and bring you up from them; I will bring you back to the land of Israel." (Ezekiel 37).

The choice of the vision of the valley of dry bones in Ezekiel as a key event in the history of the Jewish people is understandable, the prophecy describes the end of times, and the return of the entire nation to the land of Israel.

=== The Warsaw Ghetto Uprising ===
The central branch presents two modern day events: the establishment of the state of Israel and the Warsaw Ghetto Uprising. The relief of the uprising describes many characters, that represent the different Jews in the ghetto: The fighters are seen with guns in their hands, or armed with axes, sticks, and knives. Alongside them appear different characters like an old Jew carrying a Torah scroll, a dead woman with a baby slipping from her arms, a man crying blocking his mouth with his hand, an elderly woman crying over the death of the dead child in her hands and more. Above all these stands a large man, his hands spread out and on his chest a necklace with a star of David pendant. The man's face is turned firmly upwards, in a position that appears praying. In the upper left corner, a warrior is seen swinging a rifle; this is a self-portrait of Elkan, who survived the inferno but lost much of his family in the Holocaust.

The choice of the Warsaw Ghetto Uprising as an expression of the entire Holocaust was very typical of Israel in the fifties and early sixties. The day chosen to commemorate the victims is called "Yom Hazikaron laShoah ve-laG'vurah" (Holocaust and Heroism Remembrance Day), and is held annually on 27 of Nissan, which is the date closest to the outbreak of the rebellion. Elkan continues with this line when he sought to glorify the heroism of the Jewish resistance during the Holocaust, which he says is "(t)he moral justification to life".

=== Hear, O Israel/Shema Yisrael ===
The Shema Yisrael prayer is considered one of the best known in the Jewish prayer book, and it express the belief in one God and his election of the people of Israel: "Hear O Israel, the Lord is our God, the Lord is one". The prayer appears on the central branch in the Menorah as an expression of the monotheism of Judaism to the world, as a light unto the nations. Elkan placed "Hear, O Israel" in the center of the Menorah as an element which epitomizes all the other branches and the inherent ideas of the Menorah.

=== Independence War and founding of Israel ===
At the base of the Menorah, Elkan placed the relief of the 1948 Arab–Israeli War and the founding of Israel, as an expression of the most recent significant thing that happened to the people of Israel. The relief depicts pioneers working on a rocky terrain, carving stones, plowing the land, building bridges, drilling wells, sowing and harvesting, planting and fortifying, laying down the foundations of the state. The placement of the event at the base of the Menorah appears to contradict the logic that the last event appear at the top of the Menorah and not the bottom, however Elkan express here the Zionist idea, which sees in the creation of the state of Israel the source of light for the whole Menorah.

== Outer branches ==
Elkan placed the reliefs on the Menorah not in chronological order, but rather against one another in order of branches. In this way, each relief is tied in a matter of contrast or complement with the opposite relief.

=== Jeremiah opposite Isaiah ===
Jeremiah, also known as the "prophet of destruction" lived in Jerusalem during its fall in the hands of Nebuchadnezzar, king of Babylon. In the relief, he is shown shouting and grieving for the ruined city, and the wickedness of his people. His arms are outstretched above, one clenched in a fist, in the background are the shattered towers of Jerusalem.

The prophet Isaiah, placed on the opposite branch from Jeremiah on the Menorah, lived shortly before him. His prophecies include multiple verses of comfort and descriptions of the End of Days. One of his prophecies is: "The wolf will live with the lamb, the leopard will lie down with the goat, the calf and the lion and the yearling[a] together; and a little child will lead them. The cow will feed with the bear, their young will lie down together, and the lion will eat straw like the ox. The infant will play near the cobra’s den, and the young child will put its hand into the viper’s nest. They will neither harm nor destroy on all my holy mountain, for the earth will be filled with the knowledge of the Lord as the waters cover the sea." (Isaiah, XI, FH). In the relief Isaiah is standing, hands spread out, behind him light rays that symbolize his prophetic vision. At his feet, is the realization of his prophecy: a wolf hugging a lamb, a lion and a little calf. To the right, a child is playing with a snake, the entire relief represents an idyll.

The common to both prophets is their work and life, the contrast in the content of their prophecies.

=== Maccabees opposite Rabbi Yochanan ben Zakkai ===
The Maccabees from the Hasmonean dynasty symbolize the strong Jew who stands by force of arms in front of his enemies, whose victory in front of the decrees of Antiochus is celebrated on Hanukkah. In the relief on the Menorah, the Maccabees are depicted as brave warriors in the heat of battle, waving weapons. To the left, one of them is seen swinging a hammer (makevet) which is believed to be the source of the name Maccabees. To the foot of the four brothers, lays the fifth brother, Elazar, who was killed in the battle of Beit Zechariah. Behind his head lies his personal shield, bearing the Star of David, the tradition holds that this symbol has appeared on the shield of King David and the Jewish fighters following.

Rabbi Yochanan ben Zakkai, in contrast to the Maccabees, represents the non-aggressive victory. Rabbi Yochanan Ben Zakkai met with Vespasian, the Roman emperor, during the Great Revolt and persuaded him to allow him to save the Jewish leadership when Jerusalem falls. Rabbi Yochanan Ben Zakkai is depicted in the relief with arms spread out toward the ruins of Jerusalem, its Roman marble columns broken and shattered. He himself is protected by a strong stone arch, and with him some of the sages of Israel who survived the manslaughter, and they are on their way to Yavne.

The common to both is their victory, the contrast is their way to victory war versus dialog.

=== Chassidic movement opposite the Golden age of Jewish culture in Spain ===
The Chassidic movement is a stream in Judaism, born in the mid-18th century, by Rabbi Israel Baal Shem Tov in Poland. The movement advocates the worship of God with joy, and emphasizes the direct connection of every Jew, even the most simple, to God, in the form of devotion and the help of the righteous. The act of any Jew in the world is perceived according to the Chassidic movement in a Kabbalist way, as part of the approximation of redemption or its distancing. The Chassidic movement is represented in Menorah relief as a Hasid (follower) in adherence. He is sitting in a flowering garden, his head crowned with sidelocks, surrounded by trees and birds. At his feet, a pitcher of alcoholic beverage, that Hasidim traditionally sip while gathering. Alongside the Hassid are string instruments and in the background two hasidim are seen dancing. The scene symbolizes the worship of God with joy, as is customary in the Chassidic movement, as it says in Psalms: "Worship the Lord with gladness; come before him with joyful songs." (Psalm 100:2)

The Golden age of Jewish culture in Spain is a term for the spiritual and cultural blooming of the Spanish Jews, from the 9th to the 13th century when Spain attracted Jewish immigrates. The Jewish community prospered blooming cultural and economically, and grew philosophers, poets, and important Jewish intellectuals. The Golden age of Jewish culture in Spain is represented in the Menorah relief by Maimonides holding his book "Mishneh Torah" and Aristotle's philosophy book. Next to Aristotle's book is an owl, symbolizing the " truth in the mind", while next to the "Mishneh Torah" stands a dove symbolizing the " truth of faith ". Both these two truths are the basis of the philosophy of Maimonides. Maimonides visual representation is based on a famous portrait of Maimonides. Alongside Maimonides is Rabbi Judah Halevi, one of the greatest Jewish poets in Spain, singing and playing the harp.

The chassidic movement and the Golden Age of Jewish culture in Spain represent different ways of worshiping God, both geographic distribution centers of Jewish culture in their time.

=== The exile to Babylon opposite the return to Zion ===
The exiles to Babylon are depicted in the menorah relief sitting and crying on the rivers of Babylon, as it says in Psalms "By the rivers of Babylon we sat and wept when we remembered Zion" (Psalm 137:1). At their feet lay musical instruments in accordance with the following psalms "We hanged our harps upon the willows in the midst thereof" (Psalm 137:2). In the background, the luxury buildings of Babylon can be seen.

Opposite of them on the Menorah are the returnees to Zion, led by Nehemiah, wearing a hat of a Persian or Babylonian Minister and cloak. Nehemiah stands proudly over the restorers of Jerusalem and conducts the work, while holding the Declaration of the authorization received from Artaxerxes I of Persia, allowing him to rebuild the ruins of Jerusalem. This is the only anachronistic scene in the Menorah, as one of the builders in the scene appears as a Second Aliyah pioneer, holding a gun and protecting Jerusalem. The purpose of mixing these time periods is to tie together the returnees to Zion then and today.

The common between the exile and the return is the exile itself, the connection is a revised one- exile opposite of return.

== Middle branches ==
=== Hillel the Elder opposite Ezra ===
Hillel the Elder is considered one of the humblest, patient and easy going among the sages. In the Menorah relief, he is depicted by a story from the Talmud, which appears in a series of stories depicting his patience: "...a certain heathen came before Shammai and said to him, 'Make me a proselyte, on condition that you teach me the whole Torah while I stand on one foot.' Thereupon he repulsed him with the builder's cubit which was in his hand. When he went before Hillel, he said to him, 'What is hateful to you, do not to your neighbor: that is the whole Torah, while the rest is the commentary thereof; go and learn it.'" (Babylonian Talmud: Tractate Shabbath Folio 31a). This story presented is of a non-Jew who wishes to learn the Torah of Israel quickly, and it is no wonder that Shamai (a strict figure) threw him out. Hillel chose to understand the other's request as a demand for most significant statement of the Torah of Israel, and the surprising answer is not theological, but rather a moral and social one. The relief presents a simple affair: Hillel supporting and talking to him, the latter standing on one leg.

Opposite of Hillel the Elder relief appears the relief of Ezra, a Jewish leader who led the returners to Zion, who is known for his religious regulations which included the expulsion of foreign women, the duty of reading the Torah every Monday and Thursday, and more. In the relief, Ezra is depicted standing above the people, reading from a large scroll the laws of the Torah, such as observing the Sabbath and the avoidance of assimilation. One of the people in the surrounding crowd reacts with a salute, as described in the Bible: "And Ezra the scribe stood upon a pulpit of wood, which they had made for the purpose... and Ezra opened the book in the sight of all the people; (for he was above all the people;) and when he opened it, all the people stood up And Ezra blessed the LORD, the great God. And all the people answered, Amen, Amen, with lifting up their hands: and they bowed their heads, and worshiped the LORD with their faces to the ground." (Nehemiah 8:4-6)

The common ground between Hillel and Ezra is that they are both religious leaders who have made an impact on generations to come, but while Hillel represents the Torah as a book of morality, and is considered a model of kindness and tolerance, Ezra represents the Torah as a book of rules and regulations, and is perceived as hard and uncompromising.

=== Haninah ben Teradion opposite Job ===
Rabbi Hanina ben Teradyon was a scholar in the second century CE, one of the ten martyrs and a particularly tragic character: His son went astray, his wife was killed by the Romans, his daughter was degraded and he was burned at the stake by Roman soldiers after being charged of studying Torah, which was against the Roman law. In the Menorah relief, Rabbi Hanina ben Teradyon is depicted on his knees tied to a pole, wrapped in a Torah scroll across his chest and in the background. Flames are seen surrounding Rabbi Hanina, and letters are floating before him - the letter "Alef" and "Shin" that together form the word "Esh" - fire, as is described in the Babylonian Talmud: "...On their return, they found R. Hanina b. Teradion sitting and occupying himself with the Torah, publicly gathering assemblies, and keeping a scroll of the Law in his bosom. Straightaway they took hold of him, wrapt him in the Scroll of the Law, placed bundles of branches round him and set them on fire. They then brought tufts of wool, which they had soaked in water, and placed them over his heart, so that he should not expire quickly... His disciples called out, 'Rabbi, what seest thou?' He answered them, 'The parchments are being burnt but the letters are soaring on high." (Babylonian Talmud: Tractate ‘Abodah Zarah Folio 18a)

The relief opposite Rabbi Hanina is of Job, the ultimate tragic figure, a man which all happiness is denied from, only because of a "bet" between God and Satan on whether Job would continue to believe in God and to love Him despite his personal destruction. In the relief, Job is portrayed as a broken man, lying on the ground and supporting his drooping head with his hand. He is surrounded by his wife and three comrades, but, in fact, is very much alone.

The common ground between Rabbi Hanina and Job is them both being the clearest expression of "righteous and he suffers" with a few significant differences: we do not know why Rabbi Hanina was imposed with all his troubles, and his ending was bitter and bad as well, in contrast to Job, where the framework of the story clarifies the scenes, and eventually he is saved from death and receives many blessings and great longevity: "So the LORD blessed the latter end of Job more than his beginning...After this, Job lived 140 years and saw his sons and his grandsons, four generations" (Job 42:12-16). An additional difference between the two is in their response: Rabbi Hanina accepted the verdict without question, and did not try to precede his death to relieve his suffering, while Job and his friends are busy day and night with issues of compensation and wages, issues of eternity, faith and doubt.

=== Kabbalah opposite Babylonian Talmud ===
Kabbalah represents the world of Jewish mysticism and is drenched in Torah symbolism and spirituality. The kabbalah is represented in the Menorah relief in the form of a Jew deep in thought, covered from head to toe. To his right appears the Hebrew letter 'Shin" in a circle, a kabbalistic symbol depicting the Divine Presence captured by the physical world. To his left appear the Hebrew letters of the divine name, Yod Hey Vav Hey, YHWH, framed by a triangle, which represents the spiritual trinity: mind, spirit, and soul.

Opposite of Kabbalah in the Menorah is the relief of the Babylonian Talmud (Talmud Bavli in Hebrew), a fundamental book of Jewish law, which was edited and sealed 1,500 years ago. The Talmud, in contrast to the Kabbalah, does not address, at least openly, spirituality, but rather focuses on technical matters relating to Jewish law, in order to define a clear way for the observant person. Alkan chose to depict the Talmud in the form of a Jewish scholar studying a book, his thumb raised in a characteristic way of those in a sophisticated study. To his right a man is knocking on a wooden fence made of stilts, symbolizing the fences of the Torah and the barriers against assimilation, as brought in the teaching of the Great Assembly of the wise: "Be cautious in judgment. Establish many pupils. And make a safety fence around the Torah" (Ethics of the Fathers 1:1)

=== Halakhic Literature opposite Aggadah Literature ===
Halakhic Literature is a vital collection of Jewish literature, collected over generations, that engage in the observance of Jewish law. The first official portfolio is the Mishnah, that was edited over 1800 years ago in the land of Israel, followed by the Talmud which was written by the sages. The halacha relief in the menorah is depicted by a difficult event in the Bible, in which the sons of Aaron, Nadav and Avihu, were killed by God after offering a sacrifice of "strange fire".

Aaron is located at the center of the scene, breastplate over his chest, looking at his two sons lying dead on the ground as the fire of God eats them. Aaron reaction was silent resignation "And Aaron held his peace" (Leviticus 10:3), thus expressing the authority of Jewish law as rules, not always understood and accepted. The severe judgment with which God tried Aarons sons stands contrary to the character and ways of Aaron, as brought in the Tosefta: "For so used Moses to say: 'Let legal judgment pierce the very mountain;' whereas Aaron was accustomed to make peace between man and man" (Tosefta, Sanhedrin 1:2)

The Aggadah Literature (also called Midrash) is entirely different, its definition is: "Everything written by the sages, that is not law" The Aggadah deals with stories and parables, that add a wide layer of interpretation to what is written in the Torah, and through that add "flavour" to the written text. The Aggadah Literature is depicted in the Menorah relief by in the image of King Solomon wearing a crown, sitting in a vineyard, wrapped in grapes and holding cornucopia. Solomon was chosen to represent the Aggadah, as the Song of Songs attributed to him, is seen as an allegory of a lovesick man pining for his love, like the longing of God to His people.

Both literary forms complement each other, despite their differences, and together they form the corpus of Jewish Scripture.

== Inner branches ==
=== Shimon Bar Kochba opposite King David ===
Shimon Bar Kochba was a Jewish warrior who led the rebellion against the Romans that broke 60 years after the destruction of the second temple. The revolt lasted three and a half years, and despite the successes that characterized its beginning, eventually it was annihilated, the rebels and Bar Kochba killed. Bar Kochba is depicted in the Menorah relief wearing armor as he is dying. Behind him a comet, which is symbolized by name - Bar Kochba. His original name was Bar Cozba, but it was replaced by his admirers (including Rabbi Akiva), who tied him to Bilam's redemption of Israel prophecy: "...there shall come a Star out of Jacob, and a Sceptre shall rise out of Israel, and shall smite the corners of Moab" (Numbers, 24:17.) Bar Kochba's head hangs his helmet at his feet and his dagger next to his arm. On the helmet appears a relief of a lion, as according to tradition, Bar Kochba would gallop to war atop a lion.

Opposite of Bar Kochba is the relief of young David after defeating Goliath. David holding aloft the severed head of Goliath, behind him his is harp on which the royal cape and crown are hung. At Davids' feet, is Goliath's dagger. David represents the triumph of the simple truth over the strength of the armor.

David and Bar Kochba are both considered heroes of Israel, but opposed to David who won the war, became king and founded the dynasty from which the Messiah will come from, Bar Kokhba, called by Rabbi Akiva "the Messiah King", disappointed and failed in his war.

=== Messianism opposite Ha'apala ===
Messianism is faith in the coming of the messiah, who will bring salvation at the end of days. It is depicted in the Menorah relief in the form of two people raising their hands to the built Jerusalem, illuminated by sun rays. While there are ways to "speed up" the coming of the messiah, in the end it is God's decision exclusively.

Opposite of the Messianism relief in the Menorah, is the Ha'apala relief, the immigration of Jews to the land of Israel during the British Mandate before the establishment of the state of Israel in 1948. The immigrants are seen sailing on a ship through the waves, expressing joy, curiosity, and confidence. One of them is covered with a tallit, another casts a large anchor, in the background is a representative of the community in the form of a big, muscular man, leading the ship.

Messianism is seen as the traditional and passive Jewish faith, waiting for salvation by God, whereas the Ha'apala is an expression of Jewish activism, no longer waiting for miraculous salvation, but generating its own salvation.

=== Jacob opposite Abraham ===
Jacob is portrayed in the Menorah relief fighting the angel of God, before meeting again after years with his brother Esau, as is described in Genesis "And Jacob was left alone, and there wrestled a man with him until the breaking of the day. And when he saw that he prevailed not against him, he touched the hollow of his thigh; and the hollow of Jacob's thigh was out of joint, as he wrestled with him. And he said, Let me go, for the day breaketh. And he said, I will not let thee go, except thou bless me. And he said unto him, What is thy name? And he said, Jacob. And he said, Thy name shall be called no more Jacob, but Israel: for as a prince hast thou power with God and with men, and hast prevailed." (Genesis, 32:24-28)

The naked Jacob in the relief appears doubtfully wrestling with the winged angel. This event in Jacobs life symbolizes his being a fighter, daring to stand up to the angel of the Lord and win. On this occasion, Jacob received the name 'Israel', symbolizing courage and standing up to strong forces.

Opposite of Jacob is the relief of Abraham, who, unlike Jacob, submits to God completely, when he is commanded to leave his house (Genesis 12:1), to fight kings (Genesis 14), and most strongly with the sacrifice of Isaac, where he obeys God's command to sacrifice his only son. Abraham is depicted in the Menorah as an old man, his long hair surrounding his shoulders, he is seated cross-legged on the ground, his hands raised to the sides, as a sign of humility and acceptance of God's order.

The common between Jacob and Abraham is both being founding fathers, loyal to God, but each represents a different approach to worshiping.

== Criticism of the Menorah ==
Mishory in his book Shuru, habiṭu u-re'u harshly criticizes the Menorah, calling it "a pale and discolored assembly based on worn out echoes of Western Art masterpieces" and continues adding that "If the representatives responsible for the creation of the Menorah would have focused on the substance—the images and not the frivolous issues such as the size of the reliefs, or the question whether or not the characters are naked or dressed and other Jewish law considerations, they could have saved themselves a lot of time, and arrive at an adequate solution, by contacting a more serious artist than Benno Elkan." The main point of critic Mishory brings is in the meager iconographic content in the Menorah; that Elkan did not consult with professionals or intellectuals before creating the Menorah, and that most of the represented scenes are from the Jewish people's past and not the State of Israel, which was only eight years old at the time the Menorah was gifted.

In contrast, there are many who see in the Menorah a model and symbol of the Jewish people and history. Naftali Arbel and M. Ben-Hanan, for example, in their book, The Great Menorah note that "The Menorah in the Knesset Gardens in Jerusalem determines the placement of Elkan in line with the great Jewish artists... Elkan offers hope and confidence in people turning to the 'pioneers' relief at the base of the central branch. Faith, work, creation and building are the source of the great light coming from the Menorah".

Tour guide, Yossi Bar Asher, in his writing about the Menorah, states: "It seems that nothing (like the Menorah) illustrates in such a wonderful way the history of Israel... it is recommended that tourists that visit for the first time to see the Menorah. Their gain would be twofold: observing, even if succinct, at the history of Israel, and exciting pleasure from the exquisite workmanship dedicated to the artistic design of every relief in the Menorah..."

== Illustrations ==
Left Outer Branch	Left Middle Branch	Left Inner Branch	Central Branch	Right Inner Branch	Right Middle Branch	Right Outer Branch
Isaiah (Is 11:6-8)	Ezra and the new temple	David with Goliath's head	The war with the Amalekites in Rephidim	Bar Kokhba revolt	Hillel teaches the Golden Rule	Jeremiah
Johanan ben Zakai	Job and his friends	Ha'apala (Landing of immigrants on the coast of Israel)	The Ten Commandments	Dream of the Messiah	Haninah ben Teradion	Maccabees
The Golden Age in Spain	A Talmudic scholar	Abraham	Ruth and Rachel	Struggle of Jacob	The Kabbalah	Hasidic Judaism
By the rivers of Babylon (Psalm 137:1)	Aggadah Jewish legendary literature		Vision of the Valley of Dry Bones		Halakha Jewish law	Return to Zion
Zechariah 4,6b			The Warsaw Ghetto Uprising			Zechariah 4,6a
			Shema Yisrael			
			Building of the State of Israel			
