= Froumine House =

Temporary Israeli parliament building (1950–1966)

Coordinates: 31°46′49″N 35°12′56″E

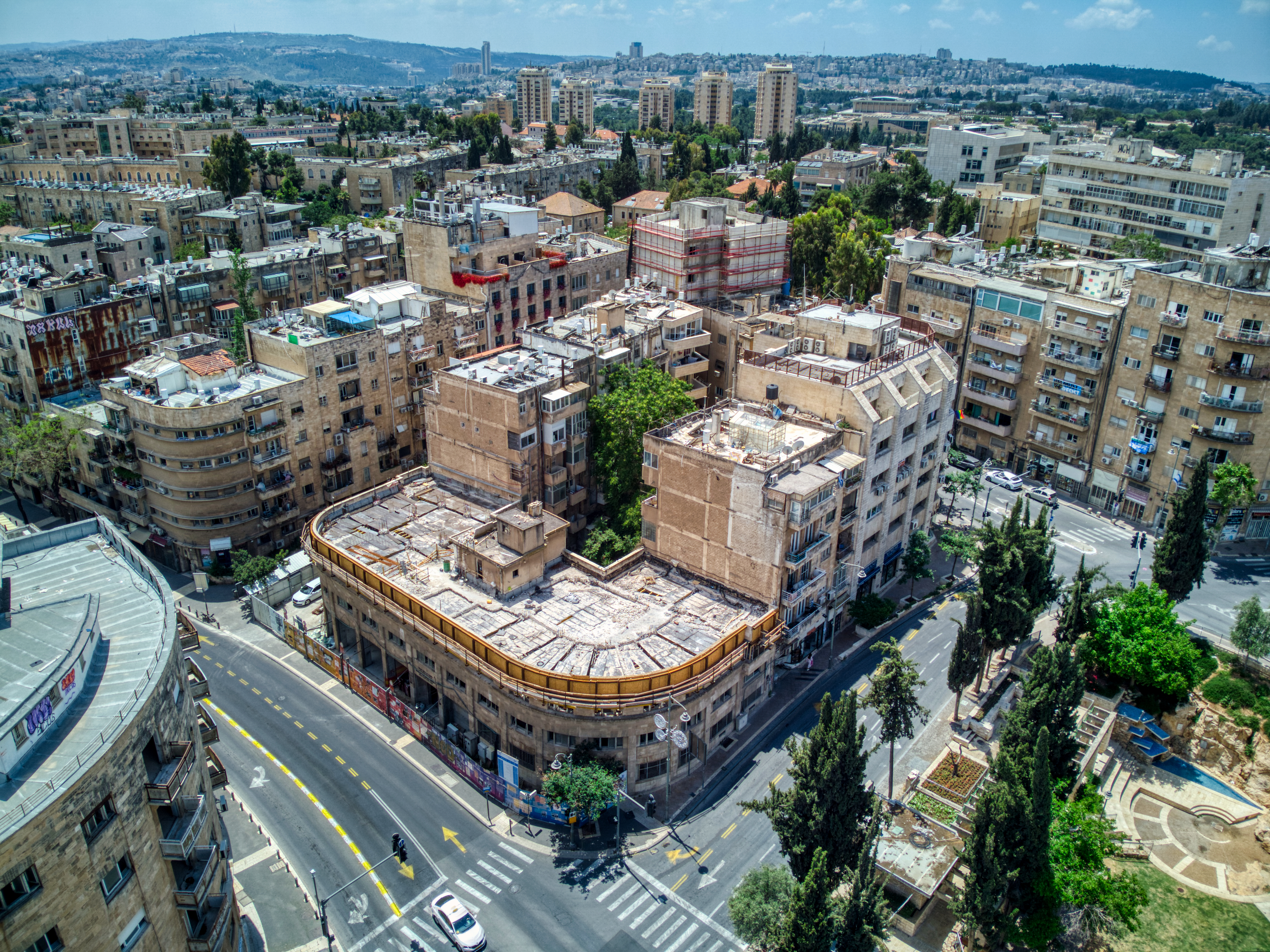
Froumine House (low building in front)

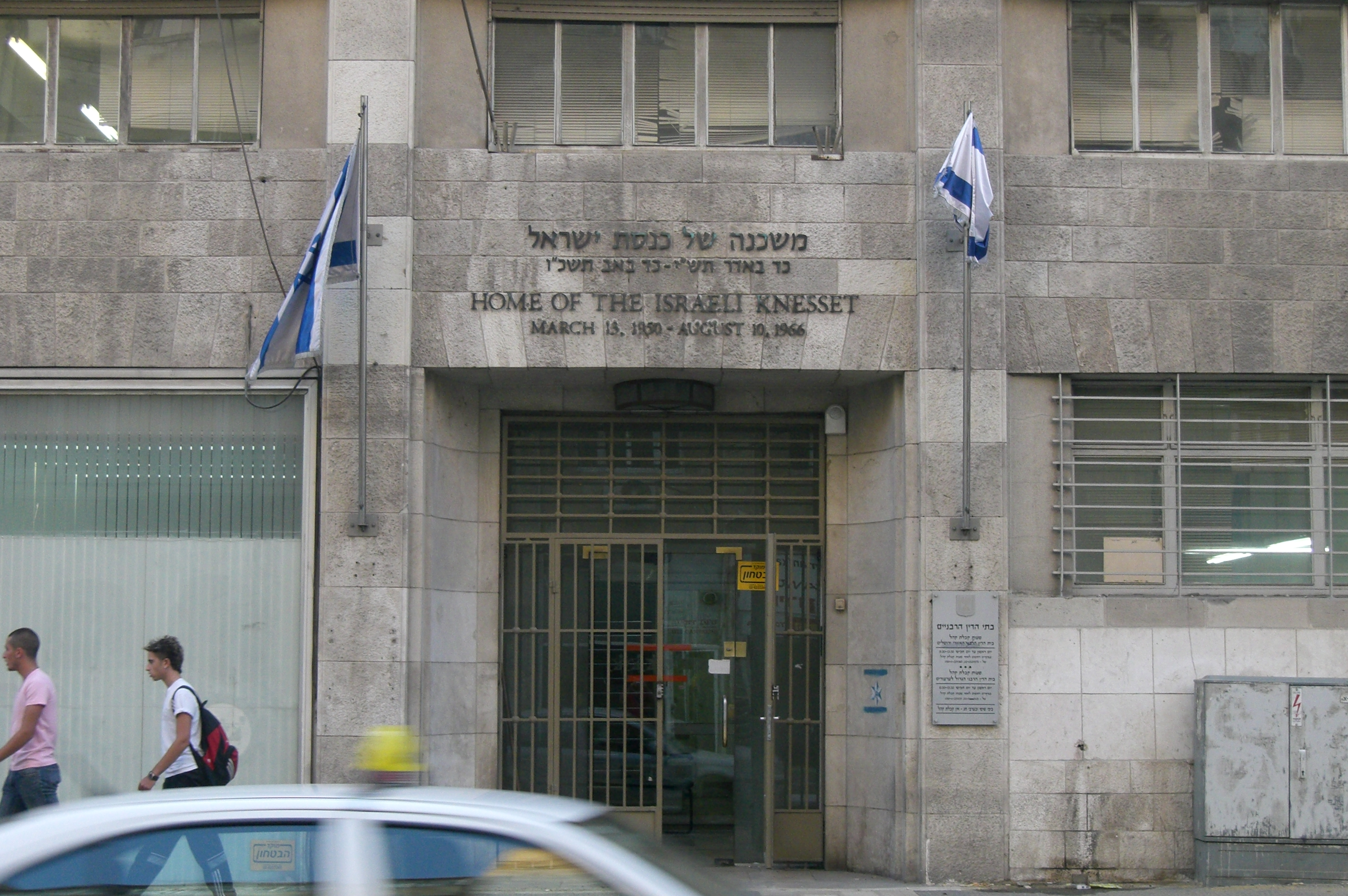
Froumine House

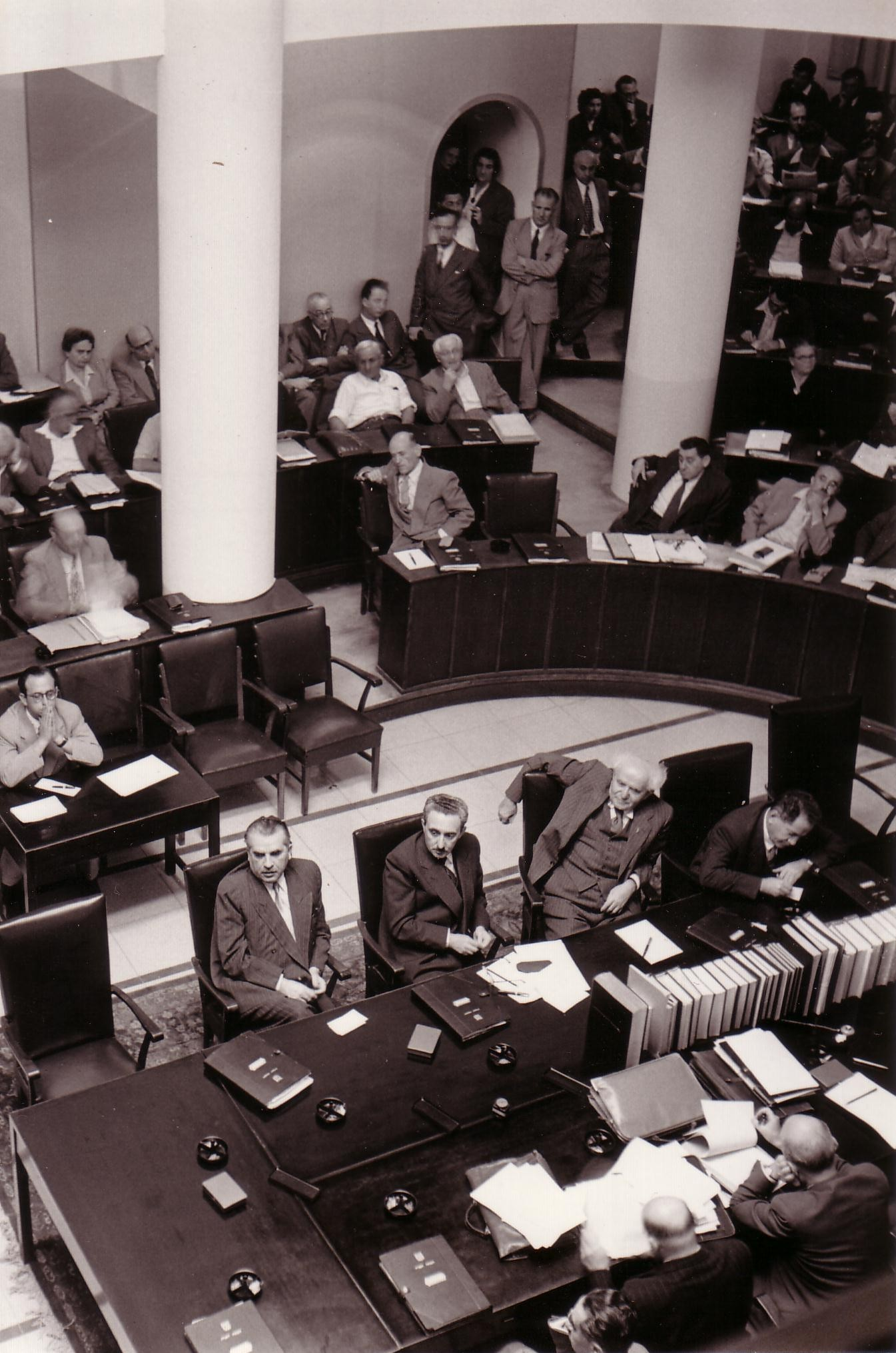
From right-left: Ze'ev Sherf, David Ben-Gurion, Moshe Sharett, and Haim-Moshe Shapira sitting at the government table in the Chamber at Froumine House.

Froumine House (or Frumin House) (Hebrew: בית פרומין; Beit Frumin; also known as the Old Knesset) was the temporary meeting place of the Knesset from 1950 to 1966. The building is at 24 King George Street in downtown Jerusalem. The first to the fifth Knesset sessions were conducted there.

== History ==
The three-story building is named after the Froumine family, who initiated its construction for residential and business purposes in 1947. The Froumine family manufactured baked goods and the building was a residence with shops on the ground floor, based on plans by architect Reuven Abram (1892–1978). It was originally intended to be a six-story structure however only three levels had been completed when construction was suspended during the 1947–1949 Palestine war.

In his book on construction in Jerusalem during the British Mandate, architectural historian David Kroyanker wrote that at the end of 1948, the government chose the building (then only a skeleton) as the home of the Knesset because of its large ground-floor hall. The hall, which had an upper balcony, was originally meant to be a bank. In a Haaretz article in 2003, journalist Esther Zandberg speculated: "The first building's city-center site, and the location of the plenum hall at street level were, without a doubt, an urban expression of a point of view that saw democracy and the Knesset as part of everyday civil existence, in contrast with its isolation in the present-day fortified compound". Kroyanker categorizes the building, which stretches between Be'eri and Schatz Streets as having been planned in the "corridor" style (a continuum of construction along the length of the street), which is characteristic of the main streets in the city center and imparts a European character to them.

The building, designed in the modern style typical of the Mandate period, has a convex corner that follows the line of the intersection, and a saw-tooth stone strip that divides the first two stories from the third story. The stone strip that is typical of Abram's style appears in many other buildings he designed in the city center, including the Beit Mar Chaim building opposite Beit Froumine.

== Between 1950 and 1966 ==
Up until the end of 1949, meetings of the Provisional State Council and the first Knesset sessions had been held in several Tel Aviv locations, including the Tel Aviv Museum of Art in Dizengoff House (today Independence Hall), and in the "Kessem" movie house located at Knesset Square.

On 26 December 1949, the Knesset moved to Jerusalem, where it held its first meetings in the Jewish Agency's impressive semi-circular building in Rehavia. After weighing several options, including the King David Hotel, the Knesset selected Froumine House for a more permanent meeting place. At the time, it was still-unfinished. From 13 March 1950, meetings of the Knesset were held there.

During Knesset sessions, King George Street in the area of Froumine House was closed for traffic, which caused great disruption to residents of the city. In addition, the location of Knesset meetings on a main street in the city-center resulted in security problems. During the demonstration against the Reparations Agreement between Israel and West Germany in 1952, protesters threw stones at the building, shattering windows and penetrating the plenum chamber. A hand grenade was also thrown into the plenum hall in 1957, which wounded Golda Meir, David Ben-Gurion, Moshe Shapira and Moshe Carmel. Nevertheless, the "old Knesset building" was the site of a number of formative civil events, such as the passage of the Law of Return (1950), the Citizenship Law (1952) and the abolition of the death penalty (1954) although the execution of Adolf Eichmann was carried out in 1962 in Ramla.

In 1956, in a green garden near the building, on the "Bor Shiber" lot, the distinctive bronze Knesset Menorah, a gift from the United Kingdom, was placed. The garden was then renamed "Gan HaMenora" ("Garden of the Menorah"). When the new Knesset building was inaugurated, the Menorah was moved to the Wohl Rose Park. In 2012 a nearby parking lot still carried the name "Menorah Parking".

The Knesset relocation occurred during the Sixth Knesset. The last meeting of the Knesset at Froumine House was held on 11 August 1966. After recess, the session resumed on 30 August 1966, at its new campus in the Jerusalem neighborhood of Givat Ram.

== Between 1967 and 2010 ==
After the departure of the Knesset, Froumine House was used by various government agencies. The Ministry of Tourism was located in the building until 2004. The building was then used by various branches of the Ministry of Religious Services, including the Rabbinical courts of the Jerusalem District and the Great Rabbinical Court of Appeals. The last of these vacated in 2015 as the building began to be refurbished into a Museum of the Knesset.

In 2002, the State of Israel sold Froumine House to a private individual for 10 million shekels. The new owners filed an application with the District Planning and Building Committee to demolish Froumine House and construct a 16-story structure on the site. In response, the council for The Society for Preservation of Israel Heritage Sites (SPIHS) protested the demolition plan. A number of Knesset members sponsored a bill which was passed in 2010, stipulating that the building was to be preserved, its interior section was to be restored, and a "Museum of the Knesset" was to be established there. By law, the building was to be confiscated from its owners and handed back to the State of Israel; the owners were to receive NIS 45 million.

The 2009 Report of the State Comptroller of Israel criticized the sale and re-purchase of Froumine House by the state.
