= Knesset Land of Israel Caucus =

The Knesset Land of Israel Caucus (Hebrew: שדולת ארץ-ישראל בכנסת), also known as the Eretz Israel Caucus, is a caucus of Knesset members whose mission is "to strengthen the State of Israel’s hold" on the West Bank. While the Knesset has hundreds of caucuses, Eretz Israel Caucus one of the largest and most active caucuses within the Knesset. When launched in 2010 it had 39 members, almost a third of the Knessets 120 seats. In 2024 it grew to 51 members.

The current leaders of the caucus are Yuli Edelstein, Limor Son Har-Melech, and Simcha Rothman.
