= Light unto the nations =

Term

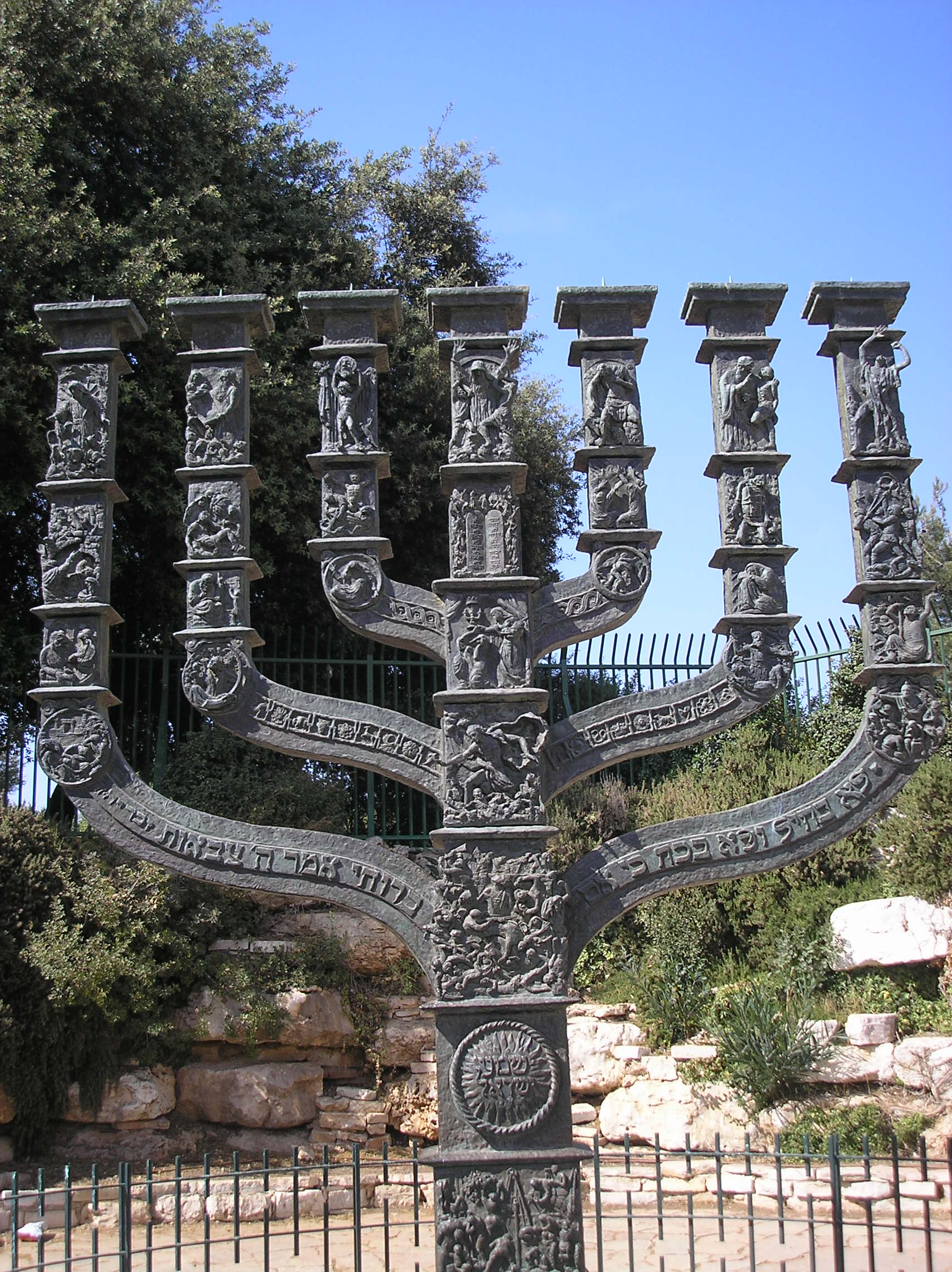
The Knesset Menorah is modeled after the golden candelabrum that stood in the Temple in Jerusalem. It is one of the emblems of Israel. Some sources claim that this choice is inspired by the vision of "Light Unto the Nations"

Light to the nations (Hebrew: אוֹר לַגּוֹיִים, romanized: ʾŌr laGōyyīm; also "light of the nations", "light of all nations", "light for all nations") is a term originated from the prophet Isaiah which is understood by some to express the universal designation of the Israelites as mentors for spiritual and moral guidance for the entire world.

== Origin ==
The term originated from verses in the Book of Isaiah:

"I the LORD have called unto you in righteousness, and have taken hold of your hand, and submitted you as the people's covenant, as a light unto the nations" Isaiah 42:6.

"Yea, He saith, 'It is too light a thing for you to be My servant, to establish the tribes of Jacob, and to restore the scions of Israel, and I shall submit you as a light unto the nations, to be My salvation until the end of the earth' Isaiah 49:6.

"And unto your light, nations shall walk, and kings unto the brightness of your rising" Isaiah 60:3.

In the first of these instances, Rashi interpreted "nations" as referring to the tribes of Israel and not to the gentiles.

== In Christianity ==
In Christianity, Jesus is held to have fulfilled the prophecy of Isaiah, with the spread of Christianity around the world bringing the light of divine revelation to the gentiles.

In the Gospel of Luke, Simeon is a devout old Jewish man to whom God had revealed that he would not die before seeing the Messiah. Upon seeing the infant Jesus in the Temple, Simeon takes this promise to have been fulfilled. His words, subsequently known as the Nunc Dimittis, identify Jesus with the light of the nations from Isaiah. Simeon says; “Master, now you are dismissing your servant in peace, according to your word; for my eyes have seen your salvation, which you have prepared in the presence of all peoples, a light for revelation to the Gentiles and for glory to your people Israel.” Luke 2:29–32

In the Acts of the Apostles, Paul the Apostle draws on the prophecy of Isaiah in his preaching announcing Jesus as the Messiah Acts 13:47 Acts 26:23. This has been related to Jesus' identification of himself with the light of the world in John's Gospel, saying; "I am the light of the world. Whoever follows me will not walk in darkness, but will have the light of life." John 8:12

== Modern usage ==
From the commencement of the era of the national revival of the Jewish people (Tekufat ha-Tehiyah, 19th-20th century), various Jewish philosophers began to see in the national revival a chance to fulfill the prophets' vision of a "Light Unto the Nations". One example that may give an insight into the term's meaning, is the one of Rabbi Abraham Isaac Kook ("HaRaAYaH"), one of the chief leaders of the Religious Zionist Movement, saw in the aspiration of the people of Israel to be a "light unto the nations" a noble part of its designation.

Upon his return from Thailand on a volunteer service trip with American Jewish World Service, Rabbi David Wolpe said to his congregation at Sinai Temple, "We don't sufficiently think about the fact that because the idea is that you're supposed to be an or lagoim, that is a light to the nations, that you can't do it if you never do anything among the nations. If you only have your light on at home, nobody else sees it. ... Nowhere in any Jewish scripture that I'm aware of will you see, 'Jews must only help other Jews.' It doesn't exist. Some Jews will tell you that, but Judaism doesn't tell you that."

In February 2018, President Donald Trump referred to the United States as a "light to all nations" at the Christian National Prayer Breakfast.

== The State of Israel as a light unto the nations ==
In his writings and speeches, Prime Minister David Ben-Gurion (1886–1973) emphasized his vision of the state of Israel as a moral and social beacon to the whole world, and by that, in his view, it shall implement the vision of the prophets. The selection of the menorah as the Emblem of Israel was derived from the image of the state of Israel as a "Light Unto the Nations".

Israel's vision of "Light Unto the Nations" was reflected in the words of Israeli Prime Minister Benjamin Netanyahu, in his address at the 2010 Herzliya Conference:

"You are dealing with our people's fate because it is clear today that the fate of the Jewish people is the fate of the Jewish state. There is no demographic or practical existence for the Jewish people without a Jewish state. This doesn't mean that the Jewish state does not face tremendous challenges, but our existence, our future, is here. The greatest change that came with the establishment of the Jewish state was that Jews became more than just a collection of individuals, communities and fragments of communities. They became a sovereign collective in their own territory. Our ability as a collective to determine our own destiny is what grants us the tools to shape our future—no longer as a ruled people, defeated and persecuted, but as a proud people with a magnificent country and one which always aspires to serve as 'Light Unto the Nations'."

Benjamin Netanyahu in his 2017 UN speech quoted the Book of Isaiah again that the state of Israel is "a light unto the nations, bringing salvation to the ends of the earth".

== See also ==
- Knesset Menorah
- Lumen gentium
