= Knesset Legal Adviser =

Knesset bureaucratic position

The Knesset Legal Adviser is the chief legal adviser of the Knesset and heads its Legal Department. The adviser provides legal advice to the Speaker of the Knesset, Knesset committees and members of the Knesset, assists with legislative proceedings, and represents the Knesset in legal matters.

The position was formally regulated by a 2000 amendment to the Knesset Law, 1994. The adviser is appointed by the Speaker, with the approval of the House Committee, from candidates recommended by a public committee. Candidates must meet the qualifications required for appointment to the Supreme Court of Israel and are subject to restrictions on political activity. The term of office is five years.

== List of Knesset Legal Advisers ==
#	Image	Name	Term of office
1		Tzvi Inbar	1980–2001
2		Anna Schneider	2001–2005
3		Nurit Elstein	2005–2010
4		Eyal Yinon	2010–2020
5		Sagit Afik	2020–incumbent
