= Knesset =

Unicameral legislature of Israel

Coordinates: 31°46′36″N 35°12′19″E

The Knesset הכנסת الكنيست
- 26th Knesset

Type
- Type: Unicameral

History
- Founded: 14 February 1949
- Preceded by: Provisional State Council; Assembly of Representatives

Leadership
- Speaker: Matan Kahana, Yashar since 17 November 2026
- Prime Minister: Benjamin Netanyahu (Note: Currently serving in a caretaker capacity.), Likud since 29 December 2022
- Leader of the Opposition: Vacant since 10 November 2026

Structure
- Seats: 120
- Political groups: Likud (27); Yashar (21); Yesodot Yisrael (3); Together (12); Bennett 2026 (7); Yesh Atid (5); Joint List (11); Hadash (5); Ta'al (3); Balad (3); Democrats (8); Ra'am (8); Independent (1); United Torah Judaism (7); Degel HaTorah (4); Homat Torat Yisrael (2); Agudat Yisrael (1); Otzma Yehudit (7); Yisrael Beiteinu (7); Shas (6); Religious Zionism–Zehut (6); Religious Zionist (5); Zehut (1)

Elections
- Voting system: Closed list proportional representation (D'hondt, 3.25% electoral threshold)
- First election: 25 January 1949
- Last election: 27 October 2026
- Next election: On or before 27 October 2030

Meeting place
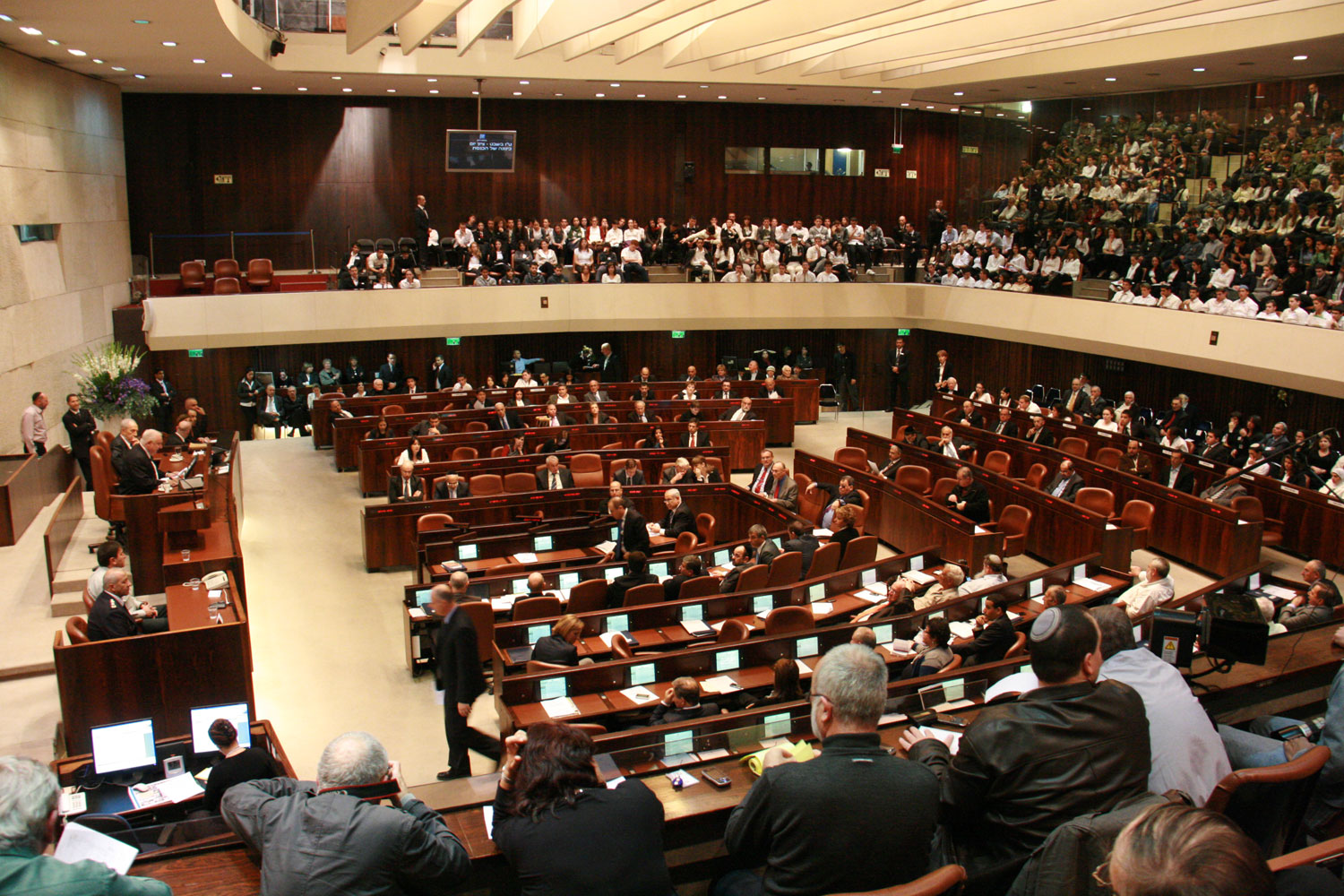
- Knesset building, Givat Ram, Jerusalem

Website
- Official website

Political system of Israel

The Knesset (Note: (Hebrew: הַכְּנֶסֶת, romanized: HaKneset [haˈkneset], lit. 'gathering' or 'assembly'; Arabic: الْكِنِيسِت, romanized: al-Kinīsit)) is the unicameral legislature of Israel. It is responsible for passing laws, electing the president and prime minister and the cabinet, and supervises the work of the government. In addition, the Knesset elects the state comptroller. It also has the power to waive the immunity of its members, remove the president and the state comptroller from office, dissolve the government in a constructive vote of no confidence, and to dissolve itself and call new elections.

The prime minister may also dissolve the Knesset; however, until an election is held, the Knesset maintains authority in its current composition. The Knesset meets in its building in Givat Ram, Jerusalem. Members of the Knesset are elected nationwide through a closed-list proportional representation system.

== Etymology ==
The term Knesset is derived from the ancient Knesset HaGdola (Hebrew: כְּנֶסֶת הַגְּדוֹלָה) or Great Assembly, which according to Jewish tradition was an assembly of 120 scribes, sages, and prophets, in the period from the end of the Biblical prophets to the time of the development of Rabbinic Judaism – about two centuries ending c. 200 BCE. There is, however, no organisational continuity and aside from the number of members, there is little similarity, as the ancient Knesset was a religious, completely unelected body. Members of the Knesset are known in Hebrew as חֲבֵר הַכְּנֶסֶת (Ḥaver HaKnesset), if male, or חַבְרַת הַכְּנֶסֶת (Ḥavrat HaKnesset), if female.

== History ==
The Knesset first convened on 14 February 1949 in Jerusalem following the 20 January elections, replacing the Provisional State Council which acted as Israel's official legislature from its date of independence on 14 May 1948 and succeeding the Assembly of Representatives that had functioned as the Jewish community's representative body during the Mandate era. Before the construction of its current location, the Knesset met in Tel Aviv, before moving to the Froumine building in Jerusalem.

The Knesset building sits on a hilltop in western Jerusalem in a district known as Sheikh Badr before the 1948 Arab–Israeli War, now Givat Ram. The main building was financed by James de Rothschild as a gift to the State of Israel in his will and was completed in 1966. It was built on land leased from the Greek Orthodox Patriarchate of Jerusalem, later purchased in the 1990s. Over the years, significant additions to the structure were constructed, however, these were built at levels below and behind the main 1966 structure as not to detract from the original assembly building's appearance.

Despite numerous motions of no confidence being tabled in the Knesset, a government has only been defeated by one once, when Yitzhak Shamir's government was brought down on 15 March 1990 as part of a plot that became known as "the dirty trick".

However, several governments have resigned as a result of no-confidence motions, even when they were not defeated. These include the fifth government, which fell after Prime Minister Moshe Sharett resigned in June 1955 following the abstention of the General Zionists (part of the governing coalition) during a vote of no-confidence; the ninth government, which fell after Prime Minister Ben-Gurion resigned in January 1961 over a motion of no-confidence on the Lavon Affair; and the seventeenth government, which resigned in December 1976 after the National Religious Party (part of the governing coalition) abstained in a motion of no-confidence against the government.

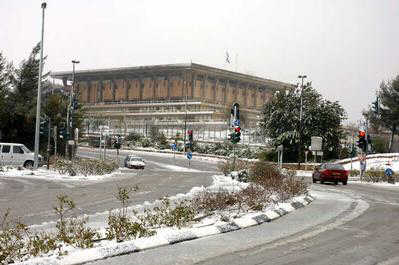
The Knesset in winter

=== Timeline ===
- 14 February 1949: First meeting of the Constituent Assembly, Jewish Agency, Jerusalem
- 16 February 1949: Name "Knesset" approved for the Constituent Assembly; number of members fixed at 120; the Knesset starts convening in Tel Aviv (first as at what is now the Opera Tower, later at the San Remo Hotel in Tel Aviv)
- 26 December 1949 – 8 March 1950: Knesset moved to Jerusalem; first convened at the Jewish Agency building
- 13 March 1950: Knesset moved to the Froumine House, in King George Street, Jerusalem
- 1950–1955: Israeli government holds architectural competitions for the permanent Knesset building. Ossip Klarwein's original design won the competition
- 1955: Government approves plans to build the Knesset in its current location
- 1957: James de Rothschild informs Prime Minister David Ben-Gurion of his desire to finance the construction of the building
- 14 October 1958: Cornerstone-laying for new Knesset building
- 30 August 1966: Dedication of new building (during the sixth Knesset)
- 1981: Construction of new wing begins
- 1992: New wing opens
- 2001: Construction starts on a large new wing that essentially doubles the overall floorspace of the Knesset compound.
- 2007: New large wing opens

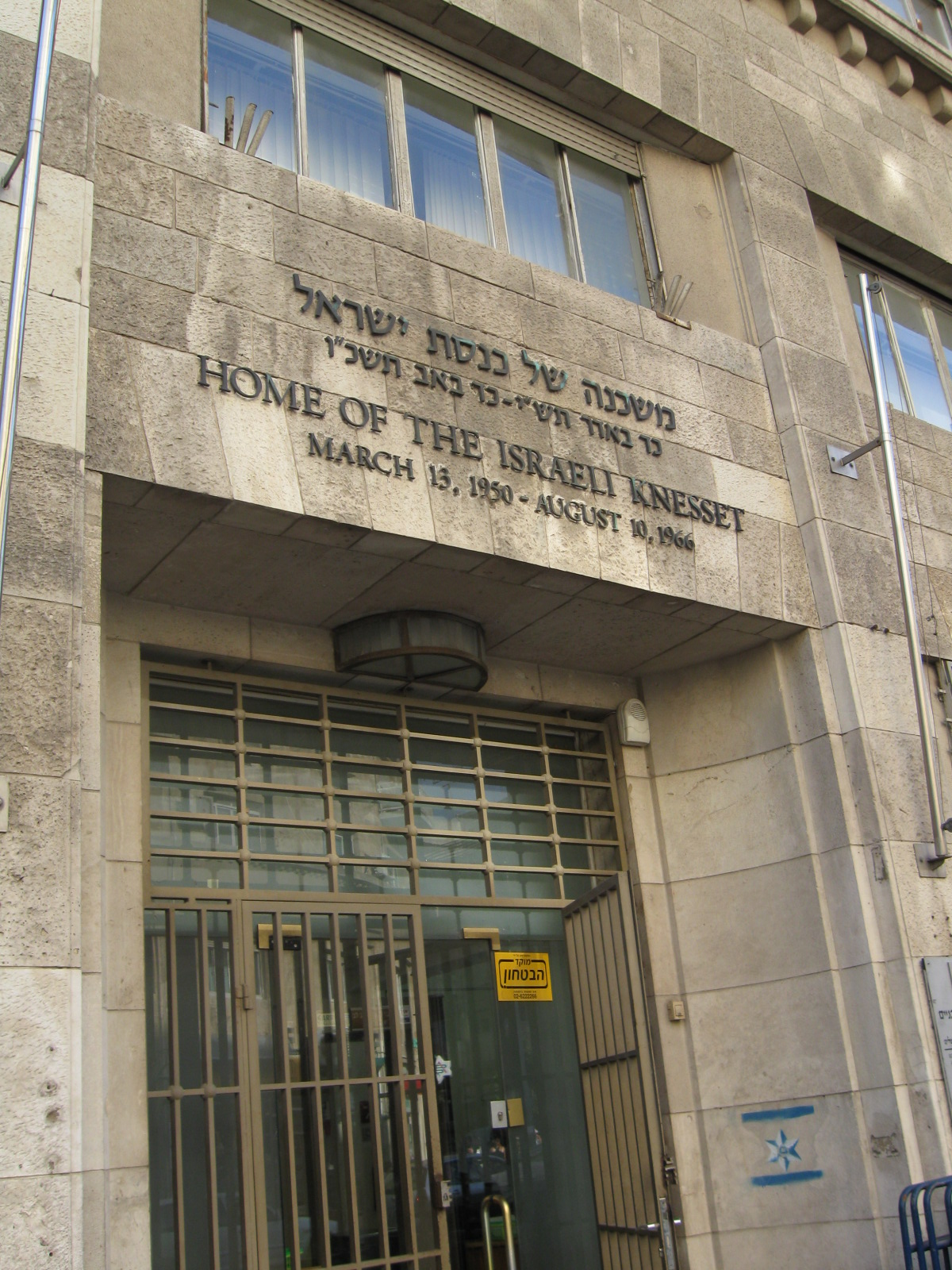
Historic engraving on the Froumine House, King George St., Jerusalem

== Government duties ==
As the legislative branch of the Israeli government, the Knesset passes all laws, elects the president, approves the cabinet, and supervises the work of the government through its committees. It also has the power to waive the immunity of its members, remove the president and the State Comptroller from office, and to dissolve itself and call new elections.

The Knesset has de jure parliamentary supremacy, and can pass any law by a simple majority, even one that might arguably conflict with the Basic Laws of Israel, unless the basic law includes specific conditions for its modification; in accordance with a plan adopted in 1950, the Basic Laws can be adopted and amended by the Knesset, acting in its capacity as a Constituent Assembly. The Knesset itself is regulated by a Basic Law called "Basic Law: the Knesset".

In addition to the absence of a formal constitution, and with no Basic Law thus far being adopted which formally grants a power of judicial review to the judiciary, the Supreme Court of Israel has since the early 1990s asserted its authority, when sitting as the High Court of Justice, to invalidate provisions of Knesset laws it has found to be inconsistent with the Basic Laws. The Knesset is presided over by a Speaker and Deputy Speakers, called the Knesset Presidium. The current composition of the Knesset Presidium is shown below.

=== Composition of the Knesset Presidium ===
The 26th Knesset appointed nine provisional deputy speakers.

Position	Name	Faction	Party
Speaker	Matan Kahana	Yashar	Yashar
Deputy	Eitan Ginzburg	Together	Bennett 2026
Deputy	Yaya Fink	The Democrats	The Democrats
Deputy	Oded Forer	Yisrael Beiteinu	Yisrael Beiteinu
Deputy	Waleed Taha	Ra'am	Ra'am
Deputy	Ahmad Tibi	Joint List	Ta'al
Deputy	Yitzhak Pindrus	United Torah Judaism	Degel HaTorah
Deputy	Yaakov Bardugo	Likud	Likud
Deputy	Limor Son Har-Melech	Otzma Yehudit	Otzma Yehudit
Deputy	Michael Malchieli	Shas	Shas

== Knesset committees ==
Knesset committees amend bills on various appropriate subjects. Knesset members are assigned to committees, while chairpersons are chosen by their members, on recommendation of the House Committee, and their factional composition represents that of the Knesset itself. Committees may elect sub-committees and delegate powers to them, or establish joint committees for issues concerning more than one committee. To further their deliberations, they invite non-voting people, like government ministers, senior officials, and experts in the matter being discussed. Committees may request explanations and information from any relevant ministers in any matter within their competence, and the ministers or persons appointed by them must provide the explanation or information requested.

There are four types of committees in the Knesset. Permanent committees amend proposed legislation dealing with their area of expertise, and may initiate legislation. However, such legislation may only deal with Basic Laws and laws dealing with the Knesset, elections to the Knesset, Knesset members, or the State Comptroller. Special committees function in a similar manner to permanent committees, but are appointed to deal with particular manners at hand, and can be dissolved or turned into permanent committees. Parliamentary inquiry committees are appointed by the plenum to deal with issues viewed as having special national importance. In addition, there are two types of committees that convene only when needed: the Interpretations Committee, made up of the Speaker and eight members chosen by the House Committee, deals with appeals against the interpretation given by the Speaker during a sitting of the plenum to the Knesset rules of procedure or precedents, and Public Committees, established to deal with issues that are connected to the Knesset.

Permanent committees:

- House Committee
- Finance Committee
- Economic Affairs Committee
- Foreign Affairs and Defense Committee
- Interior and Environment Committee
- Immigration, Absorption, and Diaspora Affairs Committee
- Education, Culture, and Sports Committee
- Constitution, Law and Justice Committee
- National Security Committee
- Committee for Special National Infrastructure Projects and Jewish Religious Services
- Labor and Welfare Committee
- Health Committee
- Science and Technology Committee
- State Control Committee
- Committee on the Status of Women

Special committees:

- Committee on Drug Abuse
- Committee on the Rights of the Child
- Committee on Foreign Workers
- Committee of Public Inquiries
- Committee for the Supervision of the Fund for Israeli Citizens
- Committee on Young Israelis
- Committee for Bridging Social Gaps in the Periphery
- Central Elections Committee
- Public Petitions Committee

The other committees are the Arrangements Committee and the Ethics Committee. The Ethics Committee is responsible for jurisdiction over Knesset members who violate the rules of ethics of the Knesset, or are involved in illegal activities outside the Knesset. Within the framework of responsibility, the Ethics Committee may place various sanctions on a member, but is not allowed to restrict a member's right to vote. The Arrangements Committee proposes the makeup of the permanent committees following each election, as well as suggesting committee chairs, lays down the sitting arrangements of political parties in the Knesset, and the distribution of offices in the Knesset building to members and parties.

== Caucuses ==
Knesset members often join in formal or informal groups known as "lobbies" or "caucuses", to advocate for a particular topic. There are hundreds of such caucuses in the Knesset. The Knesset Christian Allies Caucus and the Knesset Land of Israel Caucus are two of the largest and most active caucuses.

== Membership ==
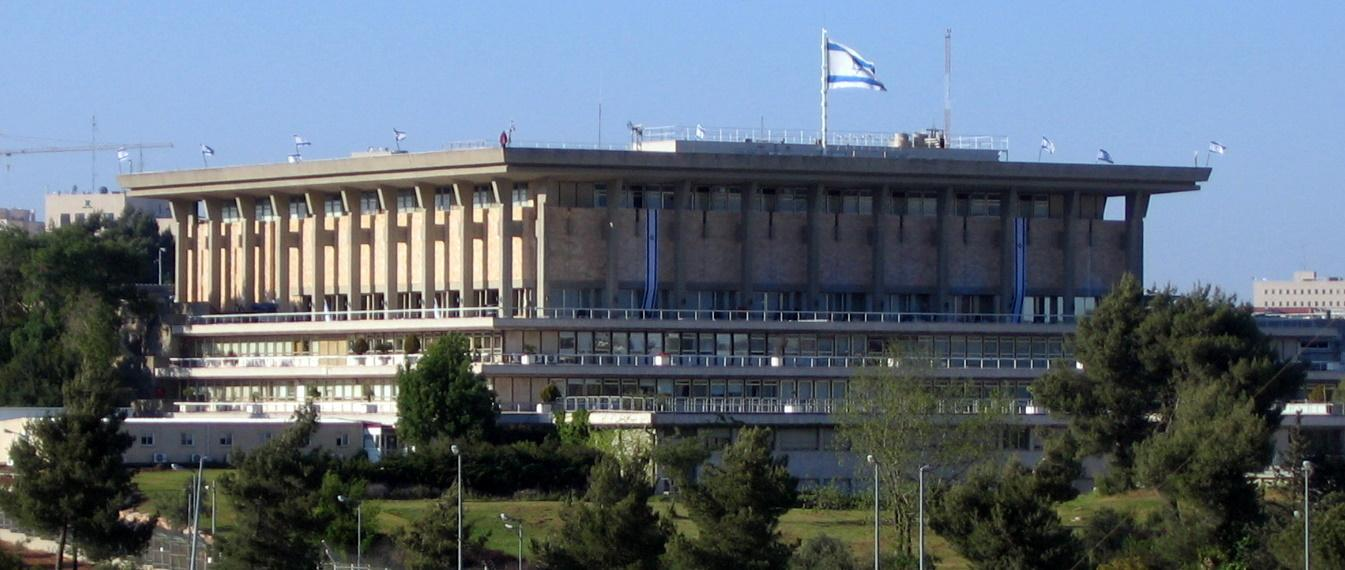
Knesset building (2007)

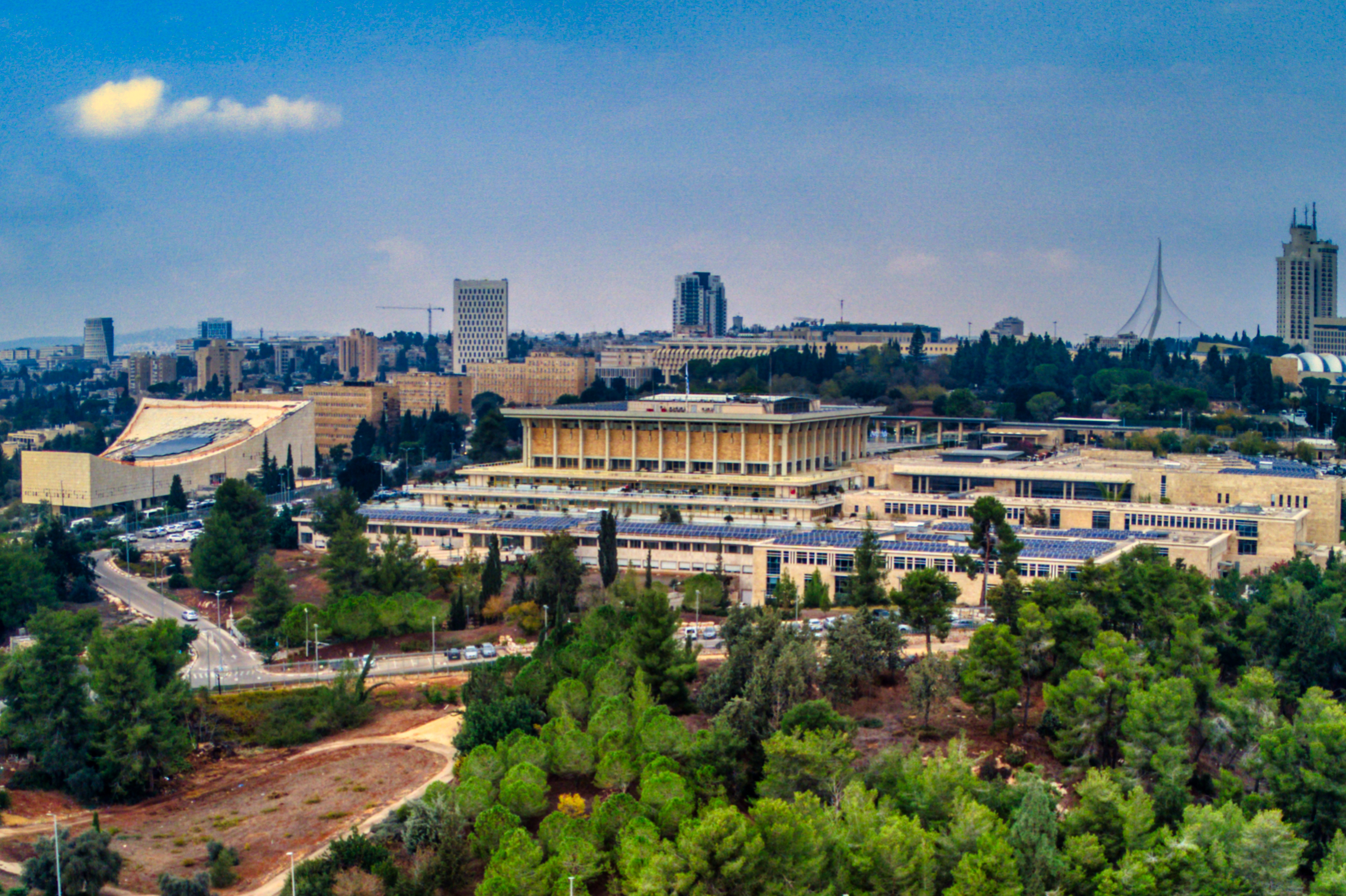
The Knesset and its surroundings (2022)

The Knesset numbers 120 members, after the size of the Great Assembly. The subject of Knesset membership has often been a cause for proposed reforms. Under the Norwegian Law, Knesset members who are appointed to ministerial positions are allowed to resign and allow the next person on their party's list to take their seat. If they leave the cabinet, they are able to return to the Knesset to take the place of their replacement.

== Knesset elections ==
The 120 members of the Knesset (MKs) are popularly elected from a single nationwide electoral district to concurrent four-year terms, subject to calls for early elections (which are quite common). All Israeli citizens 18 years or older may vote in legislative elections, which are conducted by secret ballot.

Knesset seats are allocated among the various parties using the D'Hondt method of party list proportional representation. A party or electoral alliance must pass an election threshold of 3.25% of the overall vote to be allocated a Knesset seat (in 2022, one seat for every 152,000 votes). Parties select their candidates using a closed list. Thus, voters select the party of their choice, not any specific candidate.

The electoral threshold was previously set at 1% from 1949 to 1992, then 1.5% from 1992 to 2003, and then 2% until March 2014 when the current threshold of 3.25% was passed (effective with elections for the 20th Knesset). As a result of the low threshold, a typical Knesset has 10 or more factions represented. No party or faction has ever won the 61 seats necessary for a majority; the closest being the 56 seats won by the Alignment in the 1969 elections (the Alignment had briefly held 63 seats going into the 1969 elections after being formed shortly beforehand by the merger of several parties, the only occasion on which any party or faction has ever held a majority). As a result, while there have never been more than three numerically major parties at any time and only four parties (or their antecedents) have ever led governments, all Israeli governments have been coalitions.

After an election, the president meets with the leaders of every party that won Knesset seats and asks them to recommend which party leader should form the government. The president then nominates the party leader who is most likely to command the support of a majority in the Knesset (though not necessarily the leader of the largest party/faction in the chamber). The prime minister-designate has 42 days to put together a viable government (extensions can be granted and often are), and then must win a vote of confidence in the Knesset before taking office.

The following is a list of Knesset elections:

- 1949 Israeli Constituent Assembly election
- 1951 Israeli legislative election
- 1955 Israeli legislative election
- 1959 Israeli legislative election
- 1961 Israeli legislative election
- 1965 Israeli legislative election
- 1969 Israeli legislative election
- 1973 Israeli legislative election
- 1977 Israeli legislative election
- 1981 Israeli legislative election
- 1984 Israeli legislative election
- 1988 Israeli legislative election
- 1992 Israeli legislative election
- 1996 Israeli general election
- 1999 Israeli general election
- 2003 Israeli legislative election
- 2006 Israeli legislative election
- 2009 Israeli legislative election
- 2013 Israeli legislative election
- 2015 Israeli legislative election
- April 2019 Israeli legislative election
- September 2019 Israeli legislative election
- 2020 Israeli legislative election
- 2021 Israeli legislative election
- 2022 Israeli legislative election
- 2026 Israeli legislative election

== Current composition ==
The table below lists the parliamentary factions represented in the 26th Knesset.

Name	Ideology	Symbol	Primary demographic	Leader	2026 result	
Name	Ideology	Symbol	Primary demographic	Leader	Votes (%)	Seats
Likud	Conservatism; National liberalism Right-wing populism	מחל	–	Benjamin Netanyahu; Prime Minister of Israel (Note: Serving in a caretaker capacity.)	20.51%	27 / 120
Yashar	Liberal Zionism	דרך	–	Gadi Eisenkot	16.05%	21 / 120
Together	Liberal Zionism; Economic liberalism	רק	–	Naftali Bennett	9.35%	12 / 120
Joint List	Progressivism; Israeli Arab interests	ודם	Israeli Arabs	Yousef Jabareen	8.80%	11 / 120
The Democrats	Liberal Zionism; Social democracy	אמת	–	Yair Golan	6.44%	8 / 120
Ra'am	Social conservatism Israeli Arab interests	עם	Israeli Arabs	Mansour Abbas	5.93%	8 / 120
Yisrael Beiteinu	National liberalism Secularism; Conservatism	ל	Russian-speakers	Avigdor Lieberman	5.93%	7 / 120
Otzma Yehudit	Kahanism	ב	Israeli settlers, Hardal Jews	Itamar Ben-Gvir; Minister of National Security	5.74%	7 / 120
United Torah Judaism	Religious conservatism Haredi non-Zionism	ג	Ashkenazi Haredim	Yitzhak Goldknopf	5.49%	7 / 120
Shas	Religious conservatism	שס	Sephardi and Mizrahi Haredim	Aryeh Deri	5.26%	6 / 120
Religious Zionism–Zehut	Zionism; Ultranationalism	ט	Israeli settlers, Modern Orthodox and Hardal Jews	Bezalel Smotrich; Minister of Finance	5.11%	6 / 120

== Historical composition ==
Maki / Mapam / Ahdut HaAvoda / Mapai / Arab satelliites / Progressive / Liberal / General Zionists / Others / S&O Comm. / Mizrachi / URF / Herut / Mafdal / Agudat Yisrael / RTF / PAI
1949	4 / 19 / 46 / 2 / 5 / 7 / 3 / 4 / 16 / 14
1951	5 / 15 / 45 / 5 / 4 / 20 / 3 / 2 / 8 / 8 / 3 / 2
1955	6 / 9 / 10 / 40 / 5 / 5 / 13 / 15 / 11 / 6
1959	3 / 9 / 7 / 47 / 5 / 6 / 8 / 17 / 12 / 6
1961	5 / 9 / 8 / 42 / 4 / 17 / 17 / 12 / 4 / 2

Rakah / Hadash / Maki (Note: Includes its successor parties, namely Moked (1973), Sheli (1977) and the Progressive List for Peace (1984 and 1988)) / Mapam / Ratz / Arab satelliites / Alignment / Rafi / Shinui / Ind. Liberals / Nat. List / Dash / Others / Mada / Gahal / Likud / Shas / Tzomet / Mafdal / Tami / Agudat Yisrael / RTF / PAI / Tehiya / Moledet
1965	3 / 1 / 8 / 4 / 45 / 10 / 5 / 1 / 26 / 11 / 4 / 2
1969	3 / 1 / 4 / 56 / 4 / 4 / 4 / 26 / 12 / 4 / 2
1973	4 / 1 / 3 / 3 / 51 / 4 / 39 / 10 / 5
1977	5 / 2 / 1 / 1 / 32 / 1 / 15 / 3 / 43 / 12 / 4 / 1
1981	4 / 1 / 47 / 2 / 2 / 48 / 6 / 3 / 4 / 3
1984	4 / 2 / 3 / 44 / 3 / 7 / 41 / 4 / 1 / 4 / 1 / 2 / 4
1988	4 / 1 / 3 / 5 / 39 / 2 / 1 / 40 / 6 / 2 / 5 / 7 / 3 / 2

Hadash / Balad / Meretz / Labour / One; Nation / Third Way / Shinui / Kadima / Gil / Center / Mada / Ra'am / Yisrael Beiteinu / Yisrael BaAliyah / Likud / Shas / Tzomet / UTJ / Mafdal / Jewish Home / Moledet / Nat. Union
1992	3 / 12 / 44 / 2 / 32 / 6 / 8 / 4 / 6 / 3
1996	4 / 1 / 9 / 34 / 4 / 4 / 7 / 32 / 10 / 4 / 9 / 2
1999	3 / 2 / 10 / 2 / 26 / 6 / 6 / 5 / 4 / 6 / 19 / 17 / 5 / 5 / 4
2003	3 / 3 / 6 / 3 / 19 / 15 / 2 / 2 / 38 / 11 / 5 / 6 / 7
2006	3 / 3 / 5 / 19 / 29 / 7 / 4 / 11 / 12 / 12 / 6 / 3 / 6
2009	4 / 3 / 3 / 13 / 28 / 4 / 15 / 27 / 11 / 5 / 3 / 4

Joint List ( Hadash Balad Ra'am) / Meretz / Labour / Democrats / Hatnua / B&W / Nat. Unity / Yashar / Yesh Atid / Kadima / Others / Kulanu / New Hope / Yisrael Beiteinu / Likud / Shas / UTJ / Jewish Home / Yamina / Tkuma / Otzma Yehudit
2013	4 / 3 / 6 / 15 / 6 / 19 / 2 / 4 / 13 / 18 / 11 / 7 / 12
2015	13 / 5 / 18 / 5 / 11 / 1 / 10 / 6 / 30 / 7 / 6 / 8
2019.04	6 / 2 / 4 / 6 / 35 / 4 / 2 / 5 / 35 / 8 / 8 / 5
2019.09	13 / 5 / 6 / 33 / 8 / 32 / 9 / 7 / 7
2020	15 / 3 / 3 / 33 / 1 / 7 / 36 / 9 / 7 / 6
2021	6 / 6 / 7 / 8 / 17 / 4 / 6 / 7 / 30 / 9 / 7 / 7 / 6
2022	5 / 4 / 24 / 12 / 5 / 6 / 32 / 11 / 7 / 14
2026	11 / 8 / 21 / 12 / 8 / 7 / 27 / 7 / 7 / 6 / 6

== Knesset assemblies ==
Each Knesset session is known by its election number. Thus the Knesset elected by Israel's first election in 1949 is known as the First Knesset. The current Knesset, elected in 2026, is the Twenty-sixth Knesset.

- 1st (1949–1951)
- 2nd (1951–1955)
- 3rd (1955–1959)
- 4th (1959–1961)
- 5th (1961–1965)
- 6th (1965–1969)
- 7th (1969–1974)
- 8th (1974–1977)
- 9th (1977–1981)
- 10th (1981–1984)
- 11th (1984–1988)
- 12th (1988–1992)
- 13th (1992–1996)
- 14th (1996–1999)
- 15th (1999–2003)
- 16th (2003–2006)
- 17th (2006–2009)
- 18th (2009–2013)
- 19th (2013–2015)
- 20th (2015–2019)
- 21st (2019)
- 22nd (2019–2020)
- 23rd (2020–2021)
- 24th (2021–2022)
- 25th (2022–2026)
- 26th (2026–)

== Tourism ==
The Knesset holds morning tours in Hebrew, Arabic, English, French, Spanish, German, and Russian on Sunday and Thursday, and there are also live session viewing times on Monday, Tuesday, and Wednesday mornings.

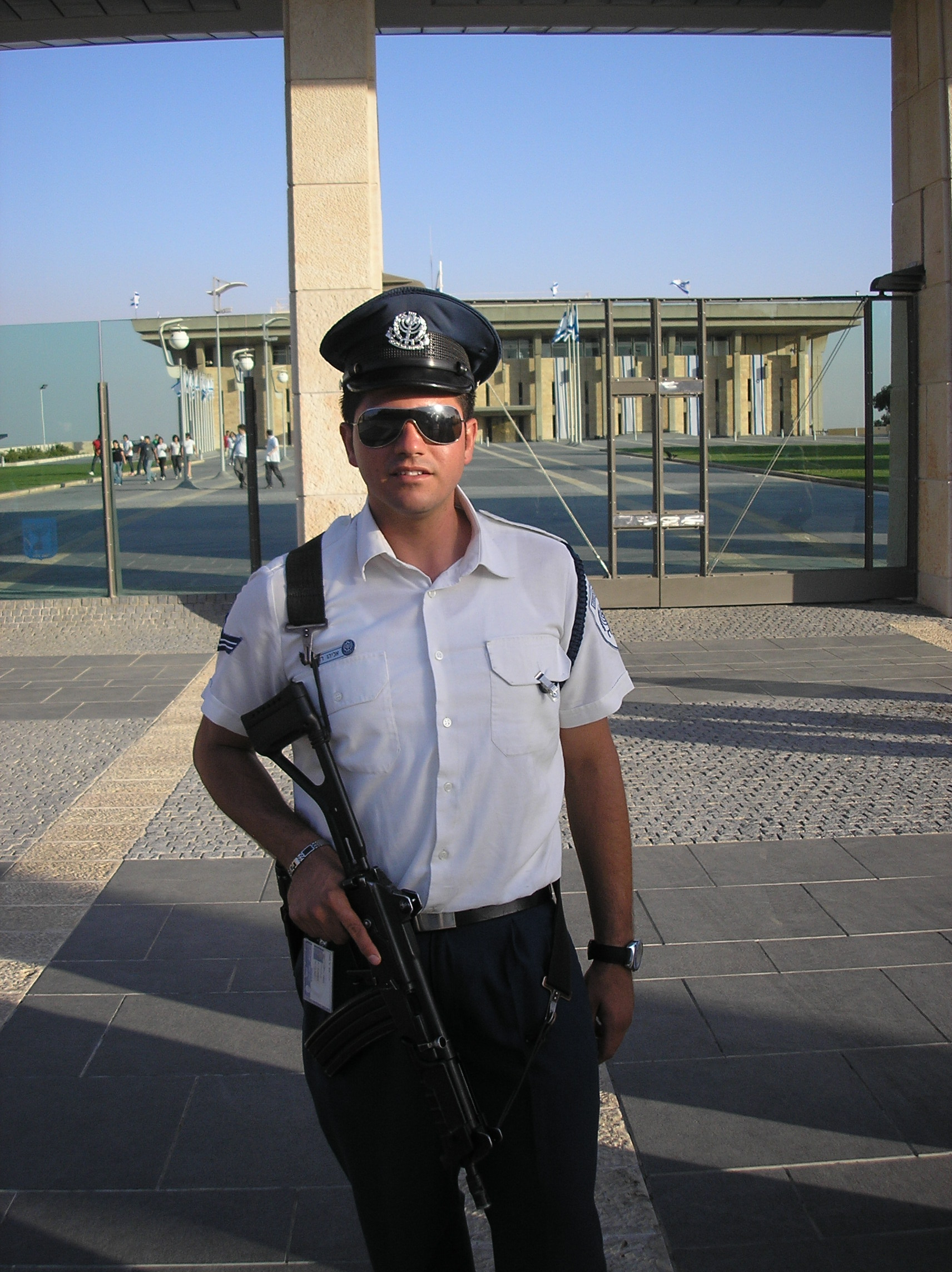
A member of the Knesset Guard

== Security ==
The Knesset is protected by the Knesset Guard, a protective security unit responsible for the security of the Knesset building and Knesset members. Guards are stationed outside the building to provide armed protection, and ushers are stationed inside to maintain order. The Knesset Guard also plays a ceremonial role, participating in state ceremonies, which includes greeting dignitaries on Mount Herzl on the eve of Israeli Independence Day.

== Public perception ==
A poll conducted by the Israeli Democracy Institute in April and May 2014 showed that while a majority of both Jews and Arabs in Israel are proud to be citizens of the country, both groups share a distrust of Israel's government, including the Knesset. Almost three quarters of Israelis surveyed said corruption in Israel's political leadership was either "widespread or somewhat prevalent". A majority of both Arabs and Jews trusted the Israel Defense Forces, the President of Israel, and the Supreme Court of Israel, but Jews and Arabs reported similar levels of mistrust, with little more than a third of each group claiming confidence in the Knesset.

== See also ==
- Great Assembly
- Elections in Israel
- Politics of Israel
- Knesset Guard
- Knesset Legal Adviser
- List of Arab members of the Knesset
- Lists of Knesset members
- List of Knesset speakers
- List of legislatures by country
