= Art Gallery of New South Wales =

Public art gallery in Sydney, Australia

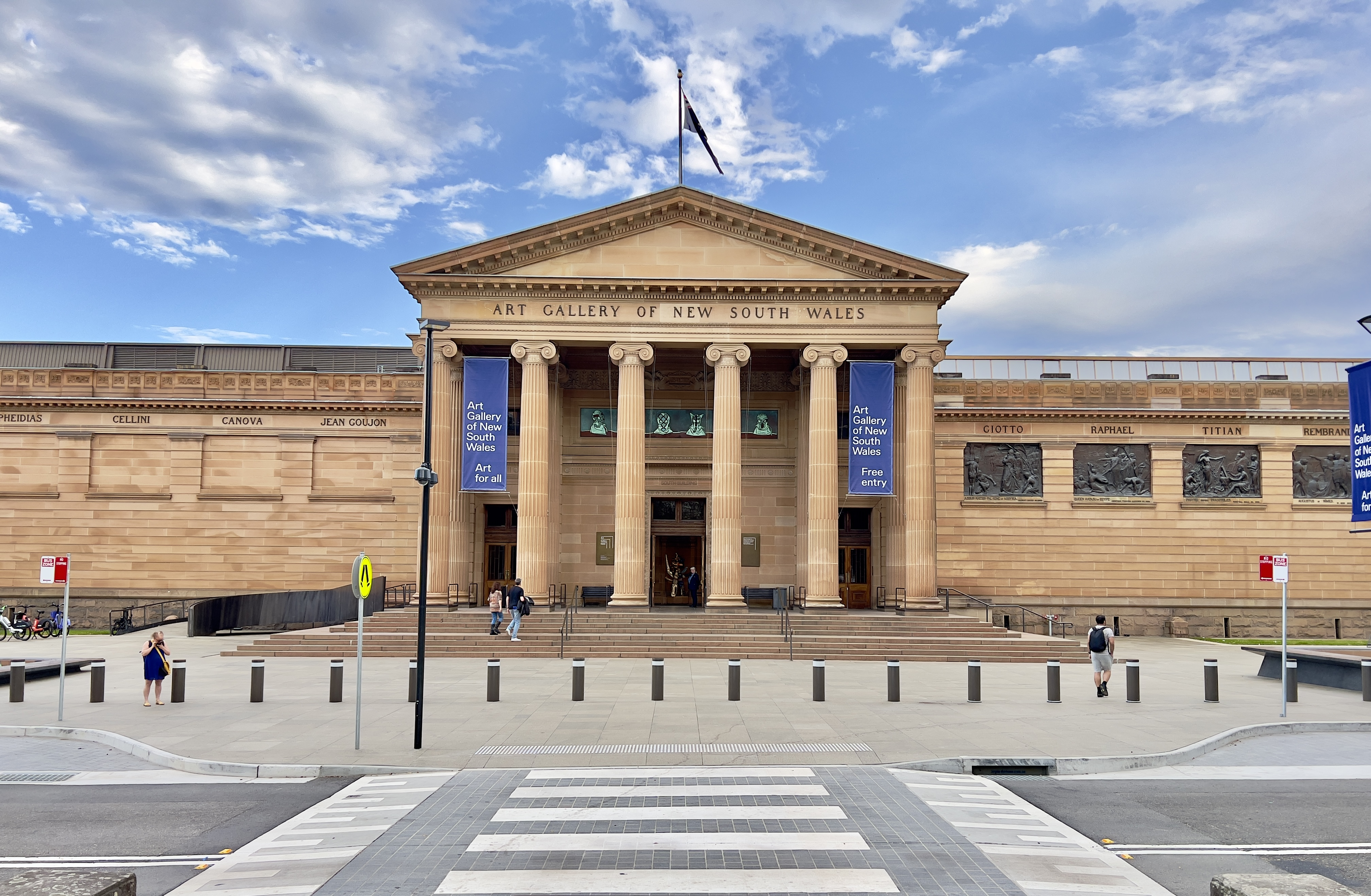
- Facade of the Naala Nura building and entrance designed by Walter Vernon
- Interactive fullscreen map
- Established: 1874; 152 years ago
- Location: Gadigal Country, Art Gallery Road, The Domain, Sydney, New South Wales, Australia
- Coordinates: 33°52′07″S 151°13′02″E
- Type: Fine arts, visual arts, Asian arts
- Visitors: 2,032,098 (2023–24)
- Director: Maud Page
- Public transit access: St James Station (10 minute walk); Martin Place Station (10 minute walk); Sydney buses
- Website: artgallery.nsw.gov.au

The Art Gallery of New South Wales (AGNSW), founded as the New South Wales Academy of Art in 1872 and known as the National Art Gallery of New South Wales between 1883 and 1958, is located in The Domain, Sydney, Australia. It is the most important public gallery in Sydney and one of the largest in Australia.

The gallery's first public exhibition opened in 1874. Admission is free to the general exhibition space, which displays Australian art (including Indigenous Australian art), European and Asian art. A dedicated Asian Gallery was opened in 2003.

== History ==
=== 19th century ===
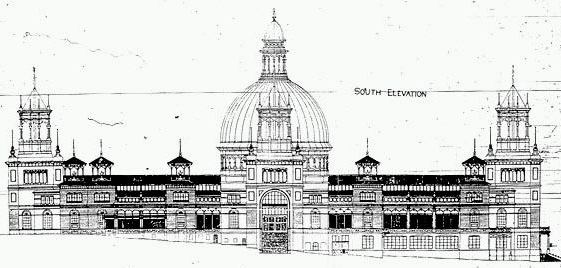
Garden Palace

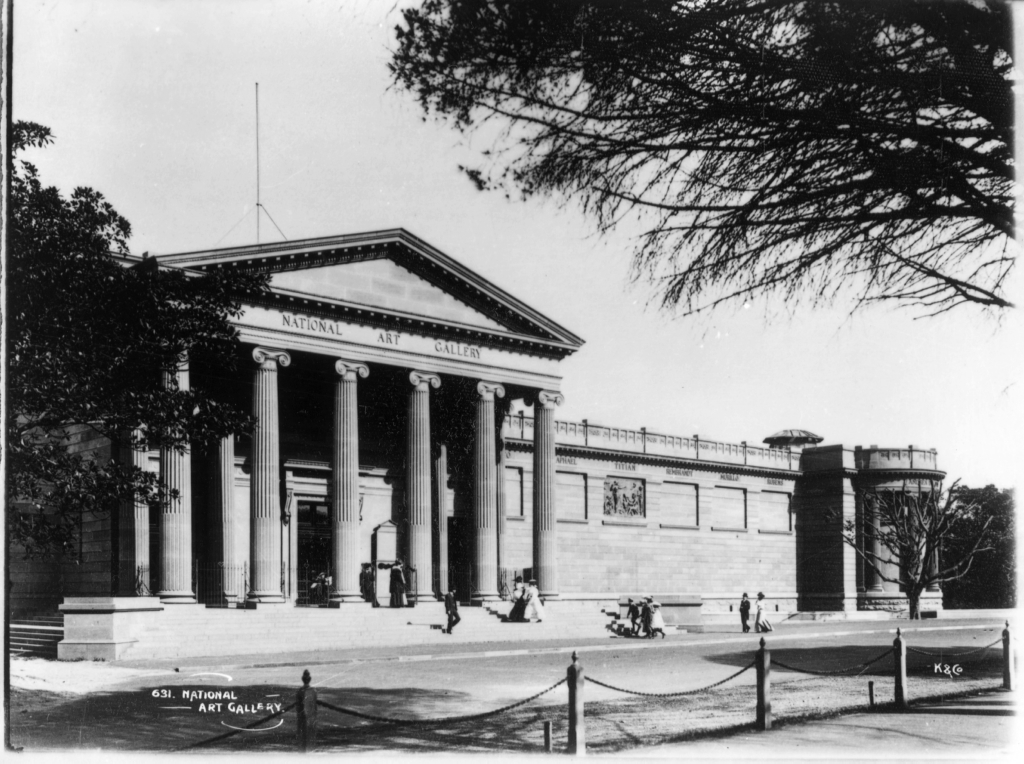
The Art Gallery of New South Wales (c. 1900)

On 24 April 1871, a public meeting was convened in Sydney to establish an Academy of Art "for the purpose of promoting the fine arts through lectures, art classes and regular exhibitions." Eliezer Levi Montefiore (brother of Jacob Levi Montefiore and nephew of Jacob and Joseph Barrow Montefiore) co-founded the New South Wales Academy of Art (also referred to as simply the Academy of Art) in 1872. From 1872 until 1879, the academy's main activity was the organisation of annual art exhibitions. The first exhibition of colonial art, under the auspices of the academy, was held at the Chamber of Commerce, Sydney Exchange in 1874.

In 1874, the New South Wales Parliament voted funds towards a new Art Gallery of New South Wales, with a board of trustees to administer the funds, one of whom was Montefiore.

In 1875, Apsley Falls by Conrad Martens, commissioned by the trustees and purchased for £50 out of the first government grant of £500, became the first work on paper by an Australian artist to be acquired by the gallery.

The gallery's collection was first housed at Clark's Assembly Hall in Elizabeth Street where it was open to the public on Friday and Saturday afternoons. The collection was relocated in 1879 to a wooden annexe to the Garden Palace built for the Sydney International Exhibition in the Domain and was officially opened as the Art Gallery of New South Wales on 22 September 1880. In 1882 Montefiore and his fellow trustees opened the art gallery on Sunday afternoons from 2 pm to 5 pm. Montefiore believed:

the public should be afforded every facility to avail themselves of the educational and civilising influence engendered by an exhibition of works of art, bought, moreover, at the public expense.

Montefiore was president of the board of trustees from 1889 to 1891, and became the director of the gallery in 1892, a position he retained until his death in 1894.

The destruction of the Garden Palace by fire in 1882 placed pressure on the government to provide a permanent home for the national collection. In 1883 private architect John Horbury Hunt was engaged by the trustees to submit designs. The same year there was a change of name to the National Art Gallery of New South Wales. The gallery was incorporated by The Library and Art Gallery Act 1899.

In 1895, the newly appointed government architect, Walter Liberty Vernon, was given the assignment to design the new permanent gallery and two picture galleries were opened in 1897 and a further two in 1899. A watercolour gallery was added in 1901 and in 1902 the Grand Oval Lobby was completed. The 32 names below the entablature were chosen by the gallery's board of trustees president, Frederick Eccleston Du Faur. The names were of were painters, sculptors, and architects with no connection to any works in the gallery at the time. Several calls to replace these names with notable Australian artists failed because the trustees could not decide on alternatives.

=== 20th century ===
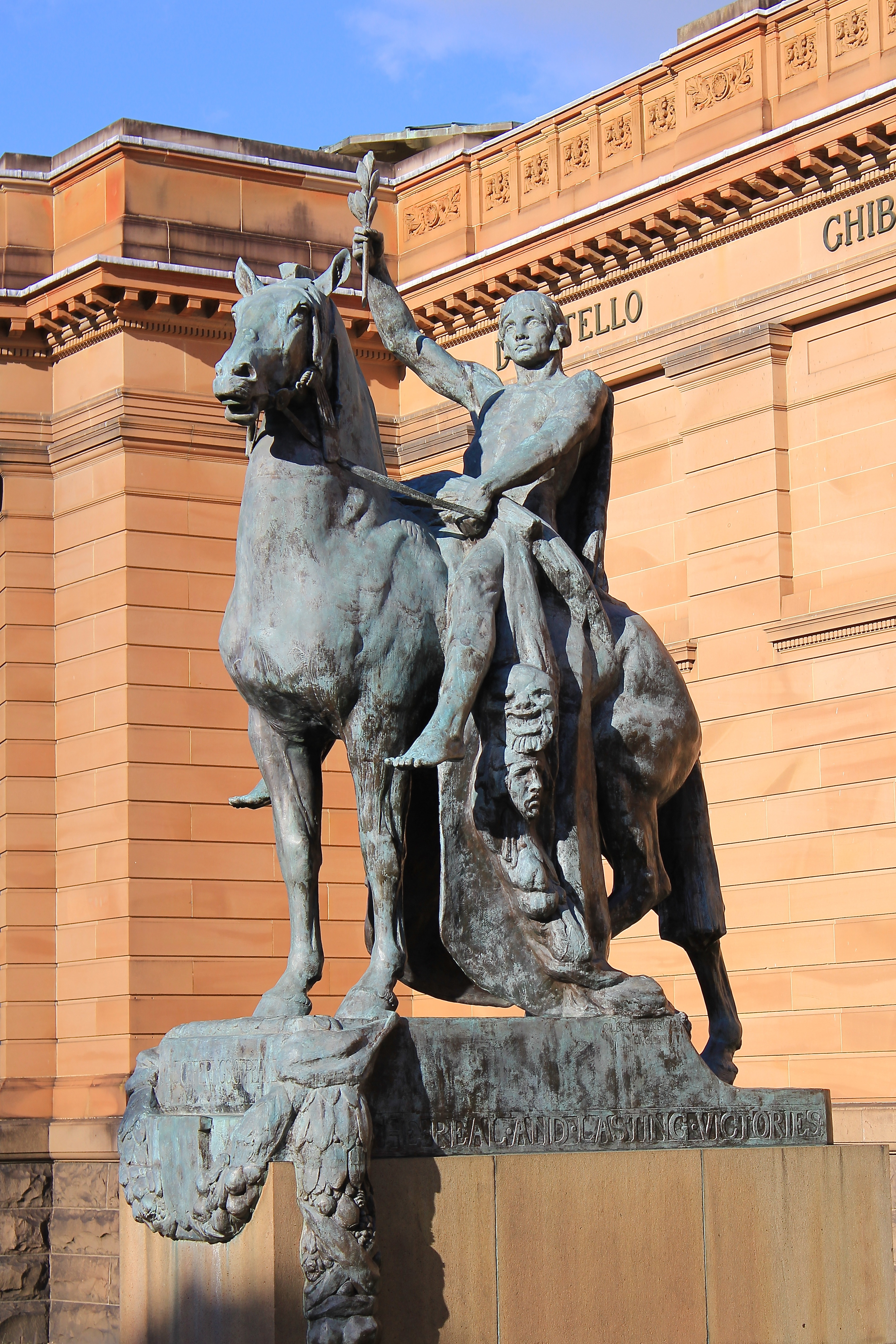
Offerings of Peace
(left side of facade)
Inscription: The Real and Lasting Victories Are those of Peace and Not of War.

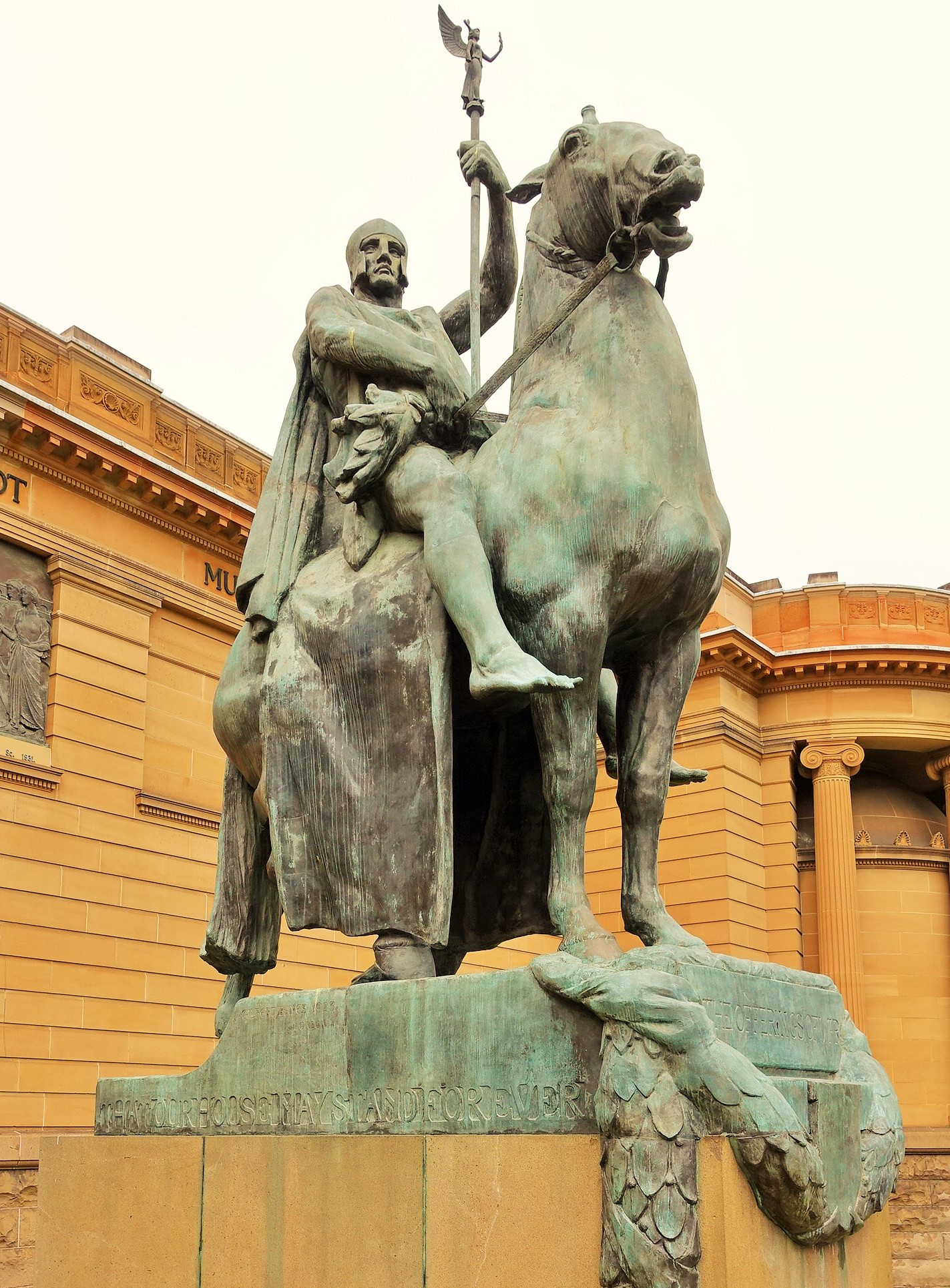
Offerings of War
(right side of facade)
Inscription: That our House may stand forever and that Justice and Mercy grow.

Over 300,000 people came to the gallery during March and April 1906 to see Holman Hunt's painting The Light of the World. In 1921, the inaugural Archibald Prize was awarded to William McInnes for his portrait of architect Desbrowe Annear. The equestrian statues The Offerings of Peace and The Offerings of War by Gilbert Bayes were installed in front of the main facade in 1926. James Stuart MacDonald was appointed director and secretary in 1929. In 1936 the inaugural Sulman Prize was awarded to Henry Hanke for La Gitana. Will Ashton was appointed director and secretary in 1937.

The first woman to win the Archibald Prize was Nora Heysen in 1938 with her portrait Mme Elink Schuurman, the wife of the Consul General for the Netherlands. The same year electric light was temporarily installed at the gallery to remain open at night for the first time. In 1943 William Dobell won the Archibald Prize for Joshua Smith, causing considerable controversy. Hal Missingham was appointed director and secretary in 1945.

On 1 July 1958 the Art Gallery of New South Wales Act was amended and the gallery's name reverted to the "Art Gallery of New South Wales". (Dropping the first word 'National'.)

In 1969 construction began on the Captain Cook wing to celebrate the bicentenary of Cook's landing in Botany Bay. The new wing opened in May 1972, following the retirement of Missingham and the appointment of Peter Phillip Laverty as director in 1971.

The first of the modern blockbusters to be held at the gallery was Modern Masters: Monet to Matisse in 1975. It attracted 180,000 people over 29 days. The 1976 the Biennale of Sydney was held at the gallery for the first time. The Sydney Opera House had been the location for the inaugural Biennale in 1973. 1977 saw an exhibition "A selection of recent archaeological finds of the People's Republic of China." Edmund Capon was appointed director in 1978 and in 1980 The Art Gallery of New South Wales Act (1980) established the "Art Gallery of New South Wales Trust". It reduced the number of trustees to nine and stipulated that "at least two" members "shall be knowledgeable and experienced in the visual arts."

With the support of Premier Neville Wran a major extension of the gallery became a Bicennential project. Opened just in time in December 1988, the extensions doubled the floor space of the gallery. In 1993 Kevin Connor won the inaugural Dobell Prize for Drawing for Pyrmont and city. In 1994, the Yiribana Gallery, dedicated to Aboriginal and Torres Strait Islander art, was opened.

=== 21st century ===
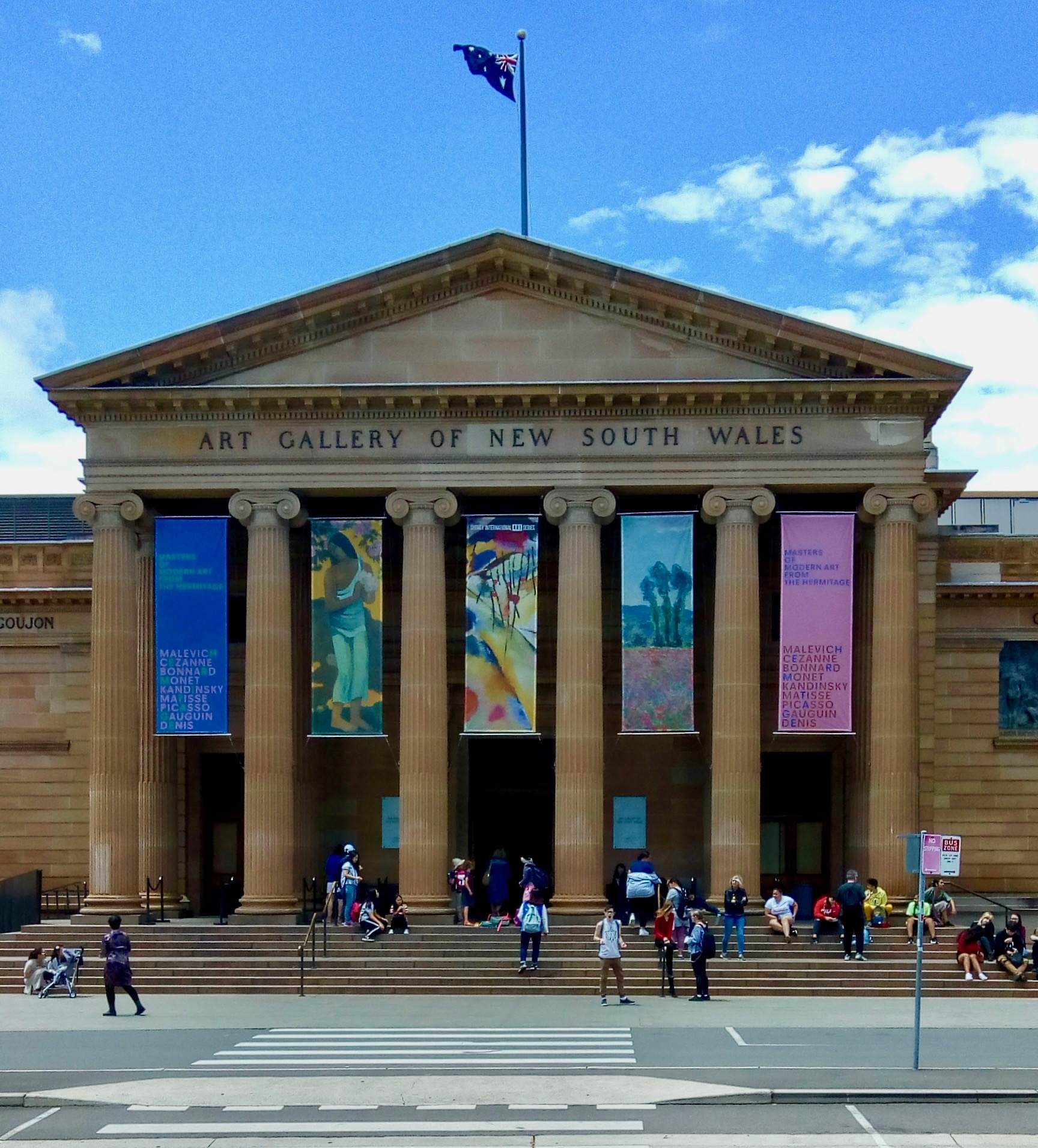
Art Gallery of New South Wales Sydney with Hermitage Exhibition banners, November 2018.

2000–2009

In 2001, the New South Wales Art Gallery announced that nine of the gallery's 40,000 artworks could have been among the many paintings stolen by the Nazis and that it was undertaking provenance research.

In 2003 an Art After Hours program was initiated with the gallery opening hours extended every Wednesday. The inaugural Australian Photographic Portrait Prize was won by Greg Weight. The Art Gallery Society of New South Wales celebrated its 50th anniversary in the same year and the Rudy Komon Gallery exhibition space was opened, followed by the new Asian gallery.

A 2004 exhibition of Man Ray's work set an attendance record for photography exhibitions, with over 52,000 visitors. The same year a legal challenge was mounted against the award of the Archibald Prize to Craig Ruddy for his David Gulpilil, two worlds; and the Anne Landa Award was established, Australia's first award for moving image and new media. The Nelson Meers Foundation Nolan Room was opened, also in 2004, with a display of five major Sidney Nolan paintings gifted to the gallery by the foundation over the past five years.

myVirtualGallery was launched on the gallery's website in 2005 and the former boardroom was reopened for display of paintings, sculptures and works on paper by Australian artists.

In 2005 Justice John Hamilton of the Supreme Court of New South Wales ruled in favour of the gallery over the disputed 2004 award of the Archibald Prize to Craig Ruddy. The same year, James Gleeson and his partner Frank O'Keefe pledged A$16 million through the Gleeson O'Keefe Foundation to acquire works for the gallery's collection.

On 10 June 2007, a 17th-century work by Frans van Mieris, entitled A Cavalier (Self-Portrait), was stolen from the gallery. The painting had been donated by John Fairfax and was valued at over A$1 million. The theft raised questions about need for increased security at the gallery. In the same year the Belgiorno-Nettis family donated A$4 million over four years to the gallery to support contemporary art.

In 2008 the gallery purchased Paul Cézanne's painting Bords de la Marne c. 1888 for A$16.2 million – the highest amount paid by the gallery for a work of art. In the same year the NSW Government announced a grant of A$25.7 million to construct an offsite storage facility and a gift from the John Kaldor Family Collection to the gallery was announced. Valued at over A$35 million, it comprised some 260 works representing the history of international contemporary art. The refurbishment of the 19th-century Grand Courts was celebrated in the gallery's inaugural 'Open Weekend' in 2009.

2010–present

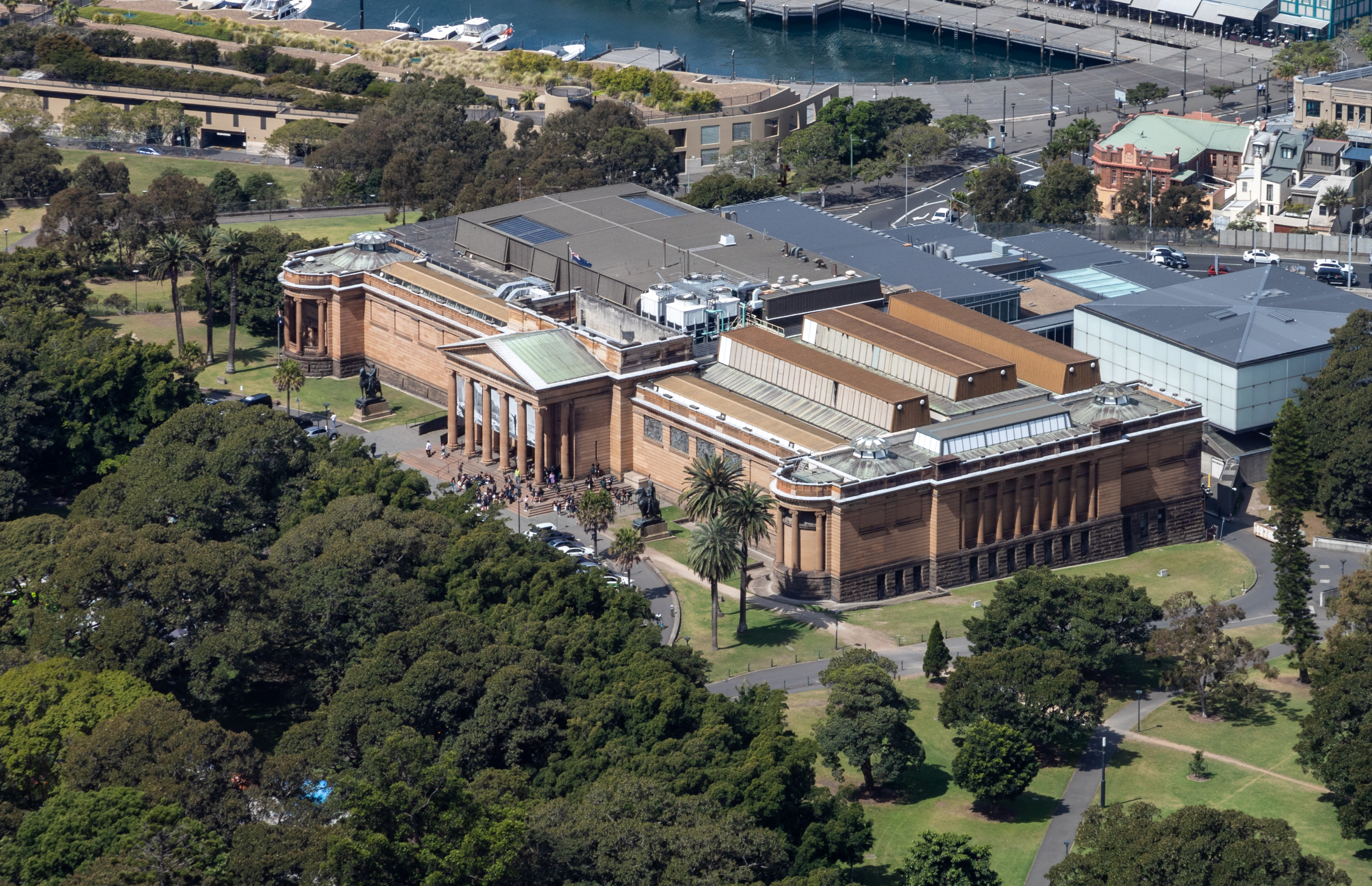
The gallery and surrounds, 2019

A new contemporary gallery was created in 2010 by removing storage racks from the lowest level of the Captain Cook wing, and artworks were relocated to a new purpose-built off-site collection storage facility. The same year, the award of the Wynne Prize to Sam Leach for Proposal for landscaped cosmos caused controversy due to the painting's resemblance to a 17th-century Dutch landscape; and the gallery announced Mollie Gowing's bequest of 142 artworks plus A$5 million to establish two endowment funds for acquisitions: one for Indigenous art and a larger one for general acquisitions.

Also in 2010 the Balnaves Foundation Australian Sculpture Archive was established, funded by the Balnaves Foundation, "to acquire the archives of major Australian sculptors and to extend research in three-dimensional practice".

The 2011 exhibition The First Emperor: China's Entombed Warriors attracted more than 305,000 people and in the same year new contemporary galleries were opened, including the John Kaldor Family Gallery, plus a dedicated photography gallery and a refurbished works-on-paper study room. In August 2011 Edmund Capon announced his retirement after 33 years as director.

Michael Brand assumed the role of director in mid-2012. Picasso: Masterpieces from the Musée National Picasso, Paris attracted almost 365,000 visitors – the largest number ever to an exhibition at the gallery, also in 2012 and Michael Zavros won the inaugural Bulgari Art Award with The New Round Room. In the same year Kenneth Reed announced his intention to bequeath his entire private collection of 200 pieces of rare and valuable 18th-century European porcelain valued at A$5.4 million.

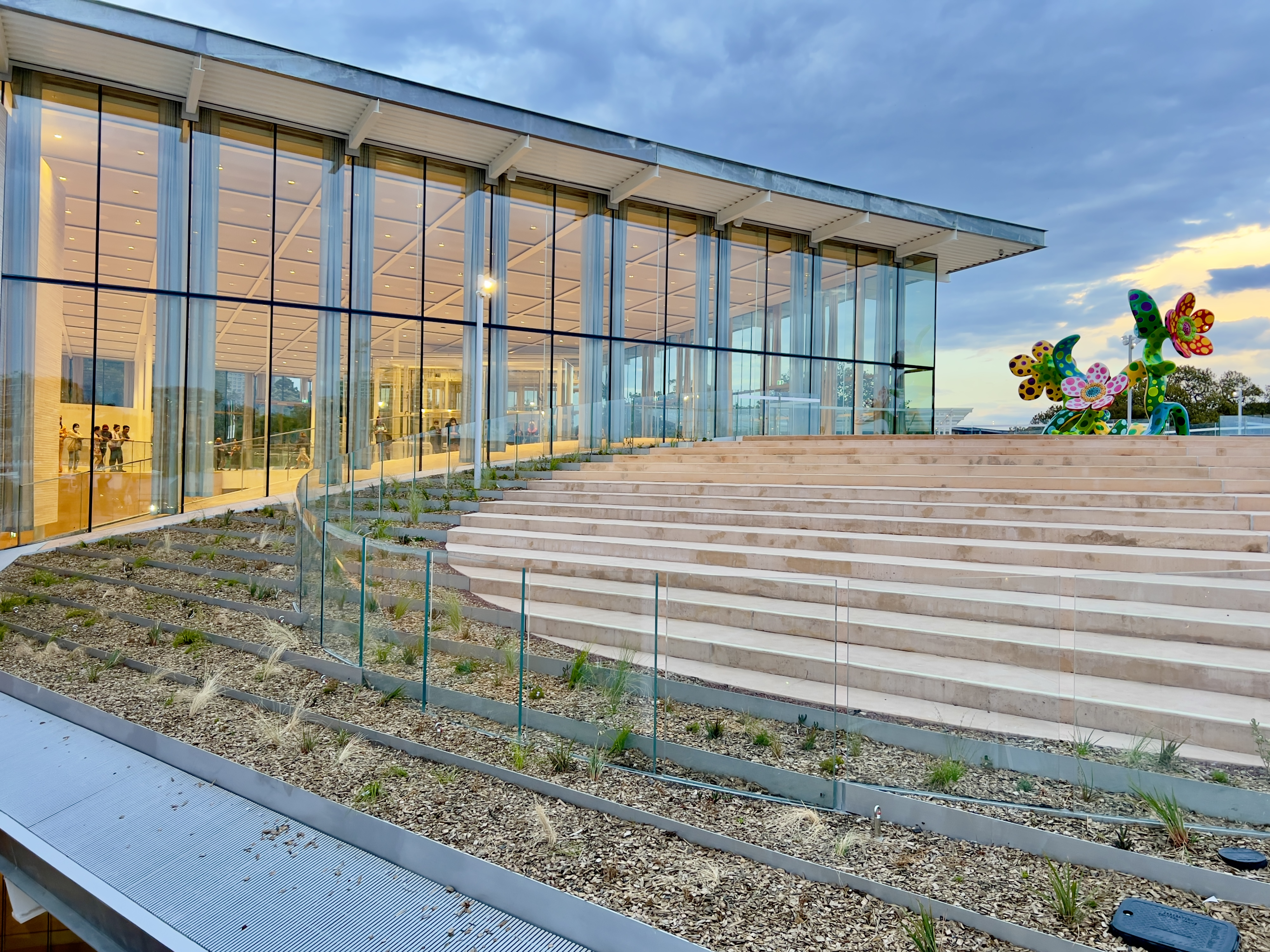
The "Sydney Modern" extension

In 2013 the gallery unveiled a strategic vision and masterplan, under the working title Sydney Modern: a proposal for major expansion and renewed focus on serving a global audience. The stated aim was to complete the project by 2021, the 150th anniversary of the gallery's founding in 1871. In the same year, the gallery received A$10.8 million from the NSW Government to finance the planning stages of Sydney Modern, which would see the construction of a new building and double the size of the institution. The money was used over the next two years for feasibility and engineering studies related to the use of land next to the gallery's existing 19th-century home, and to launch an international architectural competition.

The International design competition for the Sydney Modern Project resulted in five architectural firms being invited from an original list of twelve to submit their final concept designs in April 2015. A mix of private and NSW Government funds will pay for the A$450 million project, The firm of McGregor Coxall was chosen to redesign the gardens. The project has attracted controversy for its expense and encroachment into the public land of the Domain and the Royal Botanic Garden and its dependence on "much greater commercialisation".

In 2023, the gallery launched Volume, an annual festival combining experimental live music and performance events. The inaugural festival, held in September to October 2023, featured music events from artists including Solange, with headline events held in The Tank, a repurposed concrete oil tank located under the Sydney Modern project building.

In 2025 the gallery appointed its first woman, Maud Page, as director after the resignation of Brand in October 2024.

== Buildings ==
=== The Vernon building ===
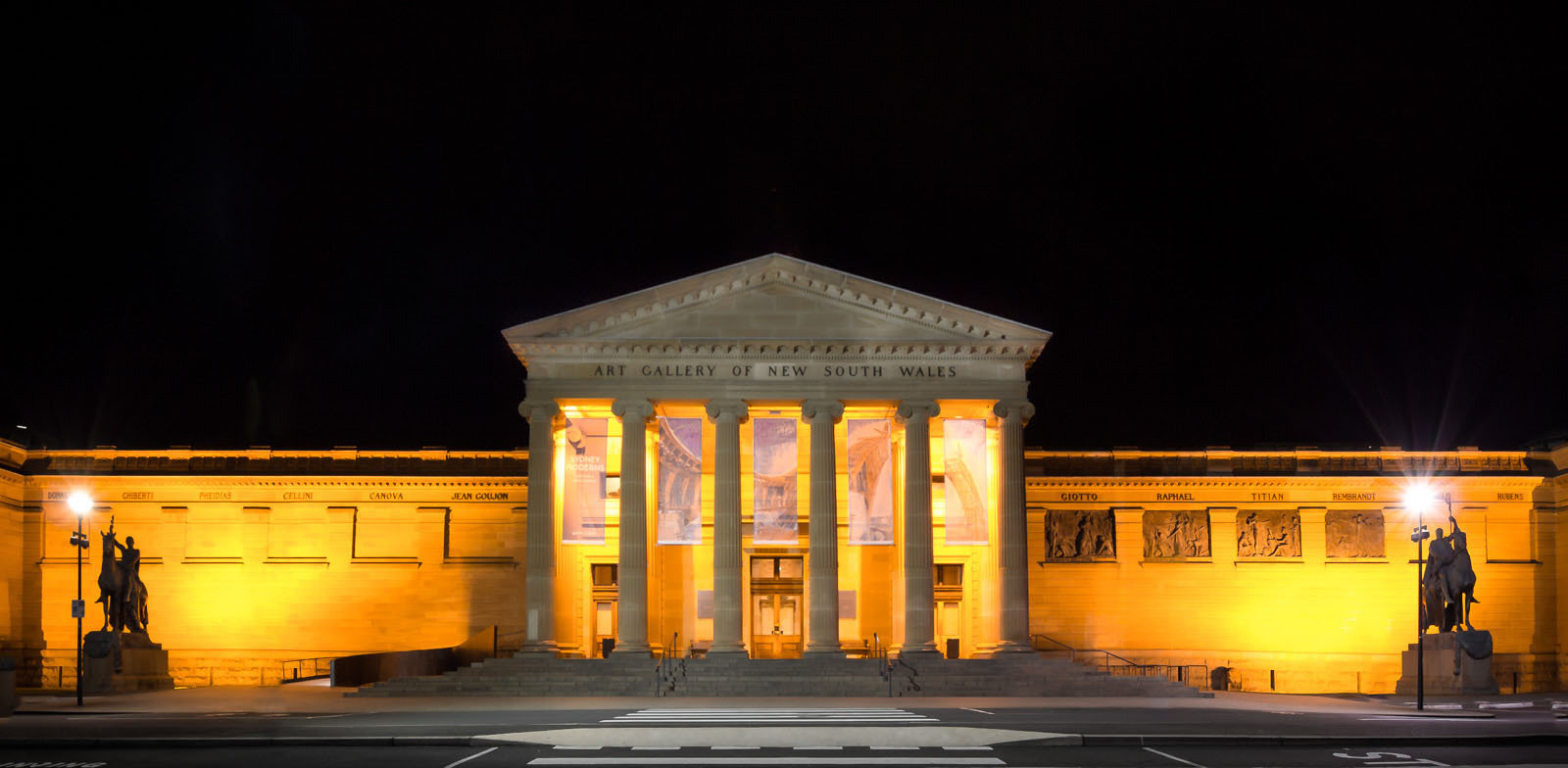
The Vernon designed wing

In 1883 John Horbury Hunt was hired to design a permanent gallery. Hunt submitted four detailed designs in various styles between 1884 and 1895, but only a temporary building in the Domain was built. With raw brick walls and a saw-tooth roof, it was denounced in the press as the "Art Barn".

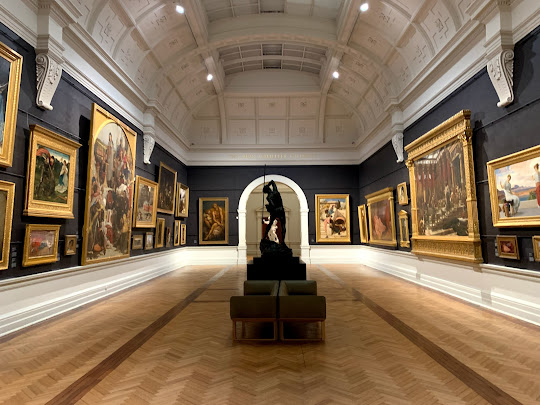
Late 19th-century art in the John Schaeffer Gallery

Newly appointed government architect, Walter Liberty Vernon, secured the prestigious commission over John Horbury Hunt in 1895. Vernon believed that the Gothic style admitted greater individuality and richness 'not obtainable in the colder and unbending lines of Pagan Classic.' The trustees were not convinced and demanded a classical temple to art, not unlike William Henry Playfair's Scottish National Gallery, Edinburgh, opened in 1859.

Vernon's building, housing eight daylight lit courts, was built in four stages. The first stage was commenced in 1896 and opened in May 1897. By 1901 the entire southern half of the building was finished. A newspaper article at the time noted:

Only one wing of the building, about one fourth of the whole structure, is at present completed, and gives rich promise of future beauty. The style is early Greek. The façade is built of thracyte and freestone. The interior is divided into four halls, each 100 feet by 30 feet, communicating with each other by pillared archways. The lighting is almost perfect, designs for the roof having been furnished by London correspondents after careful study of all the latest improvements in European galleries. The walls are coloured a chill neutral green shade, which makes an excellent background.

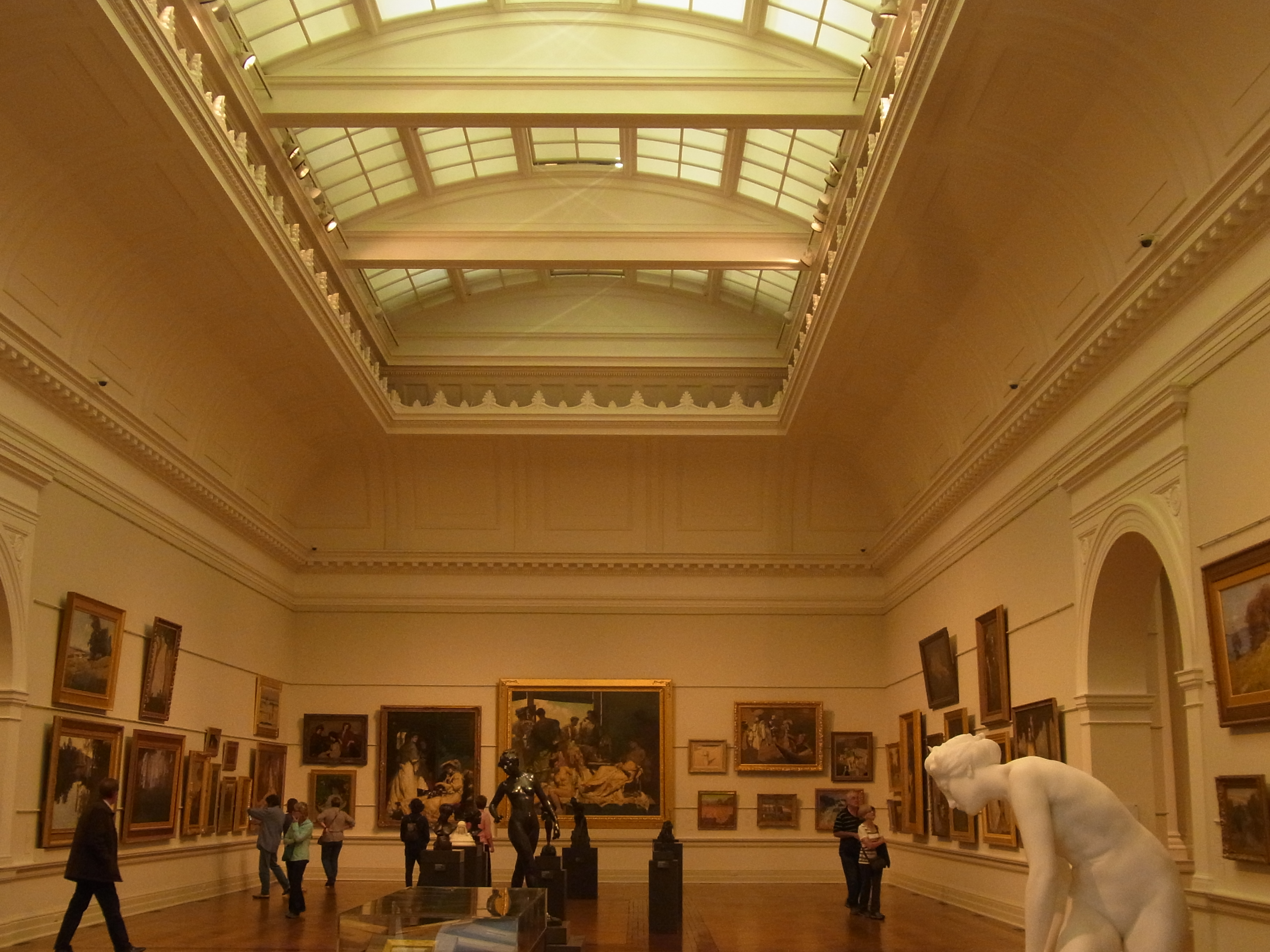
Old court by Vernon

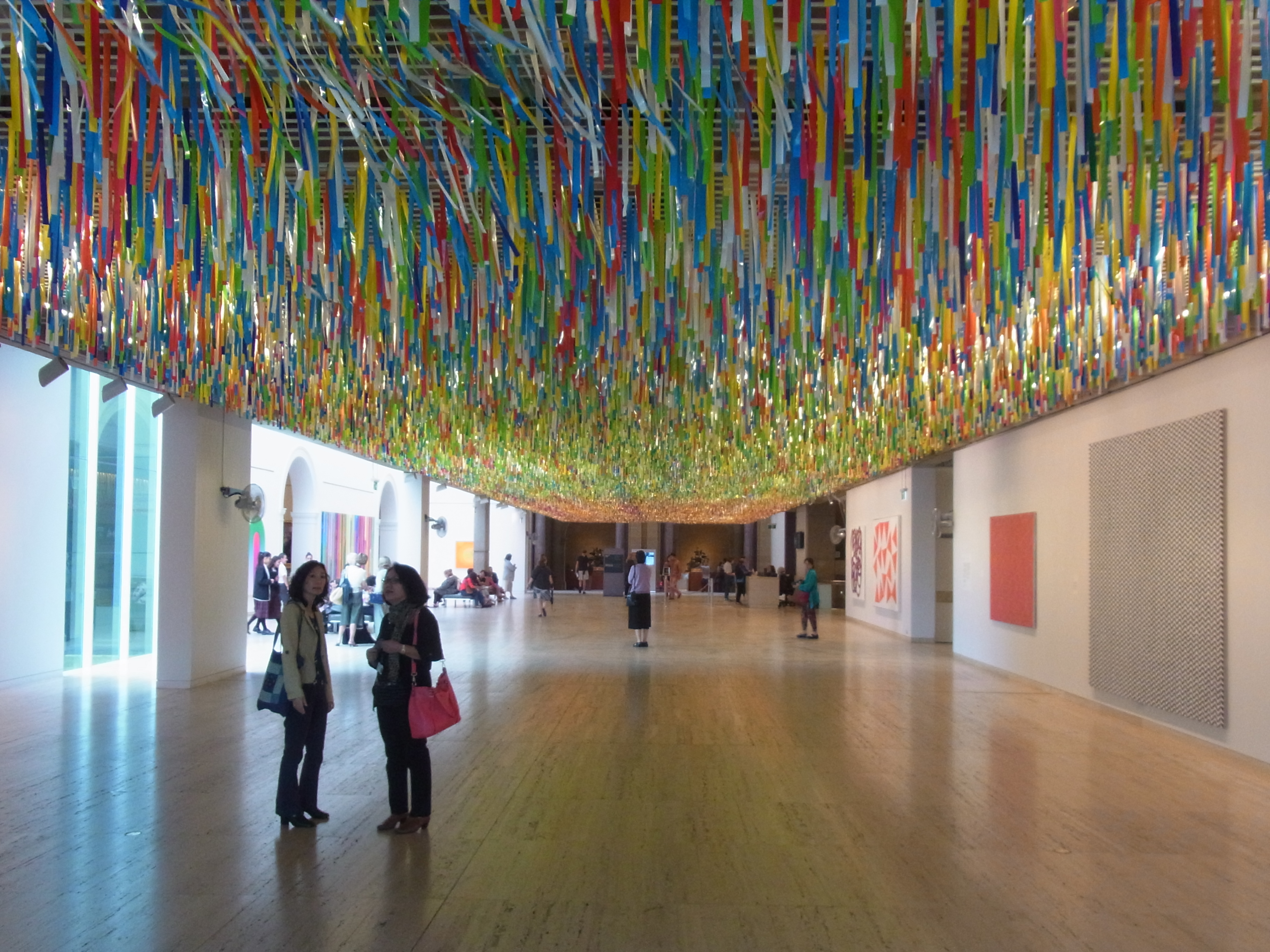
Main court with a ceiling hung work titled Rally 2014 by Nike Savvas (2014)

Vernon proposed that his oval lobby lead into an equally imposing Central Court. His plans were not accepted. Until 1969 his lobby led, by a short descent from the entrance level, to the three 'temporary' northern galleries designed by Hunt.

In 1909 the front of the gallery was finished and after this date nothing more was built of Vernon's designs. In the 1930s plans were suggested for the completion of this part of the gallery but the Great Depression and other financial constraints lead to their abandonment.

=== Captain Cook Wing ===
In 1968 the New South Wales Government decided the completion of the gallery would be a major part of the Captain Cook Bicentenary celebrations. This extension, which was opened to the public on 2 May 1972, and the 1988 Bicentennial extensions, were both entrusted to the New South Wales Government Architect, with Andrew Andersons the project architect.

The architecture of the Captain Cook Wing did not attempt to clone the classical style of Vernon's design. Andersons' design philosophy was akin to that espoused by Robert Venturi in his book Complexity and Contradiction in Architecture, as Andersons explains:

He [Venturi] argued the case for richer and more complex forms of architectural expression – for 'the juxtaposition of old and new' for dramatic visual impact, rather than striving for unity and consistency in architecture that conventional precepts then dictated.

In the Captain Cook Wing, the architect Andersons divided new from old with a wide strip of skylights in the main entry court. While in the old courts there was parquetry flooring, travertine flooring was employed in the new galleries for both permanent and temporary exhibitions. The modern need for flexibility in display layout was answered by the use of track lighting and precast ceiling panels designed to support a system of demountable walls. While the new galleries were painted off white, senior curator, Daniel Thomas, advocated a rich Victorian colour scheme to display the gallery's 19th-century paintings in Vernon's grand courts.

In 1975 the Captain Cook Wing was awarded the Sir John Sulman Medal for Public Architecture by the NSW Chapter of the Royal Australian Institute of Architects. In 2007 the building was acknowledged with the New South Wales Enduring Architecture Award.

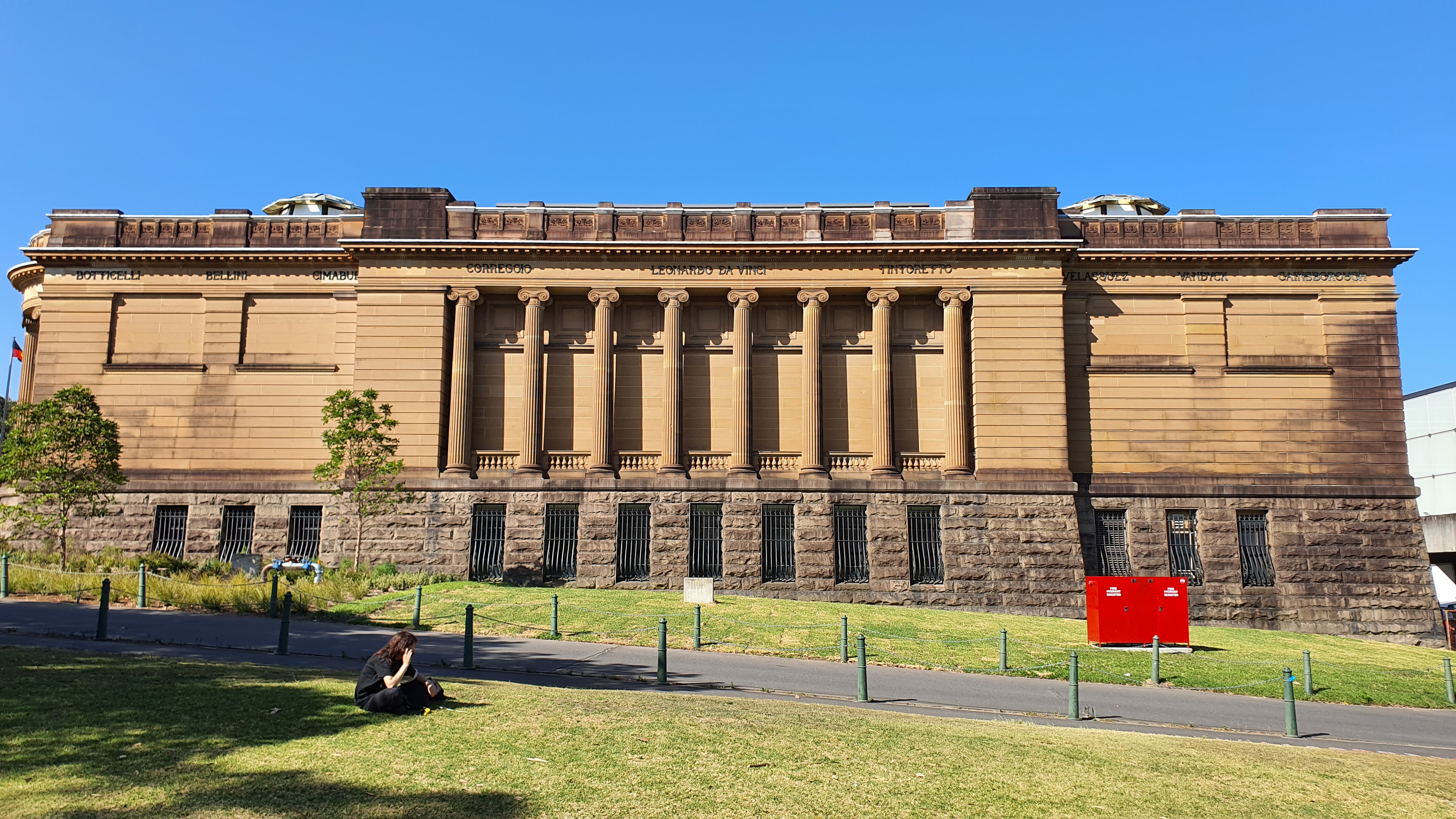
The left wall of Art Gallery of New South Wales

=== Bicentennial extension ===
Sixteen years later the 1988 Bicentennial extension was built on the Domain parkland sloping steeply to the east. Within the constraints of two large Moreton Bay fig trees, and with a substantial part of the accommodation below ground level, the extension doubled the size of the gallery. Space for permanent collections and temporary exhibitions was expanded, a new Asian gallery, the Domain Theatre, a café overlooking Woolloomooloo Bay, and a rooftop sculpture garden were added. Escalators connected four exhibition levels with the entry/orientation space. Four contemporary art 'rooms' were top lit by pyramid skylights.

=== Asian Art Gallery expansion ===
A new space for Asian art was built to add to the existing Asian art gallery immediately below. Backlit translucent external cladding glows at night and has been dubbed the 'light box'. This addition was coupled with other alterations: a new temporary exhibition space on the top level, new conservation studios, an outward expansion of the café overlooking Woolloomooloo Bay, a new restaurant with dedicated function area, a theatrette and relocation of the gallery shop. The project was designed was by Sydney architect Richard Johnson and was opened on 25 October 2003. The space involves art from all corners of Asia, including Buddhist and Hindu arts, Indian sculptures, Southern Asian textiles, Chinese ceramics and paintings, Japanese works and more.

The aesthetics of the extension were described as "cantilevered on top of the original Asian galleries, the pavilion glows softly like a paper lantern when lit at night" and as "a floating white glass and steel cube pivoted with modern stainless steel lotus flowers". The extension added 720 square metres (7,800 sq ft) to the New South Wales Art Gallery, with the new space to house temporary and permanent exhibitions. In 2004 Johnson Pilton Walker won two awards for their design of the Asian Galleries extension, including an RAIA National Commendation in the Sir Zelman Cowen Award for Public Architecture category; and a RAIA NSW Chapter Architecture Award for Public and Commercial Buildings. Over A$16 million was granted from the NSW Government for this major building project – inclusive also of the Rudy Komon Gallery, new conservation studios, café, restaurant and function area, and a refurbishment of the administration area.

=== Sydney Modern project ===
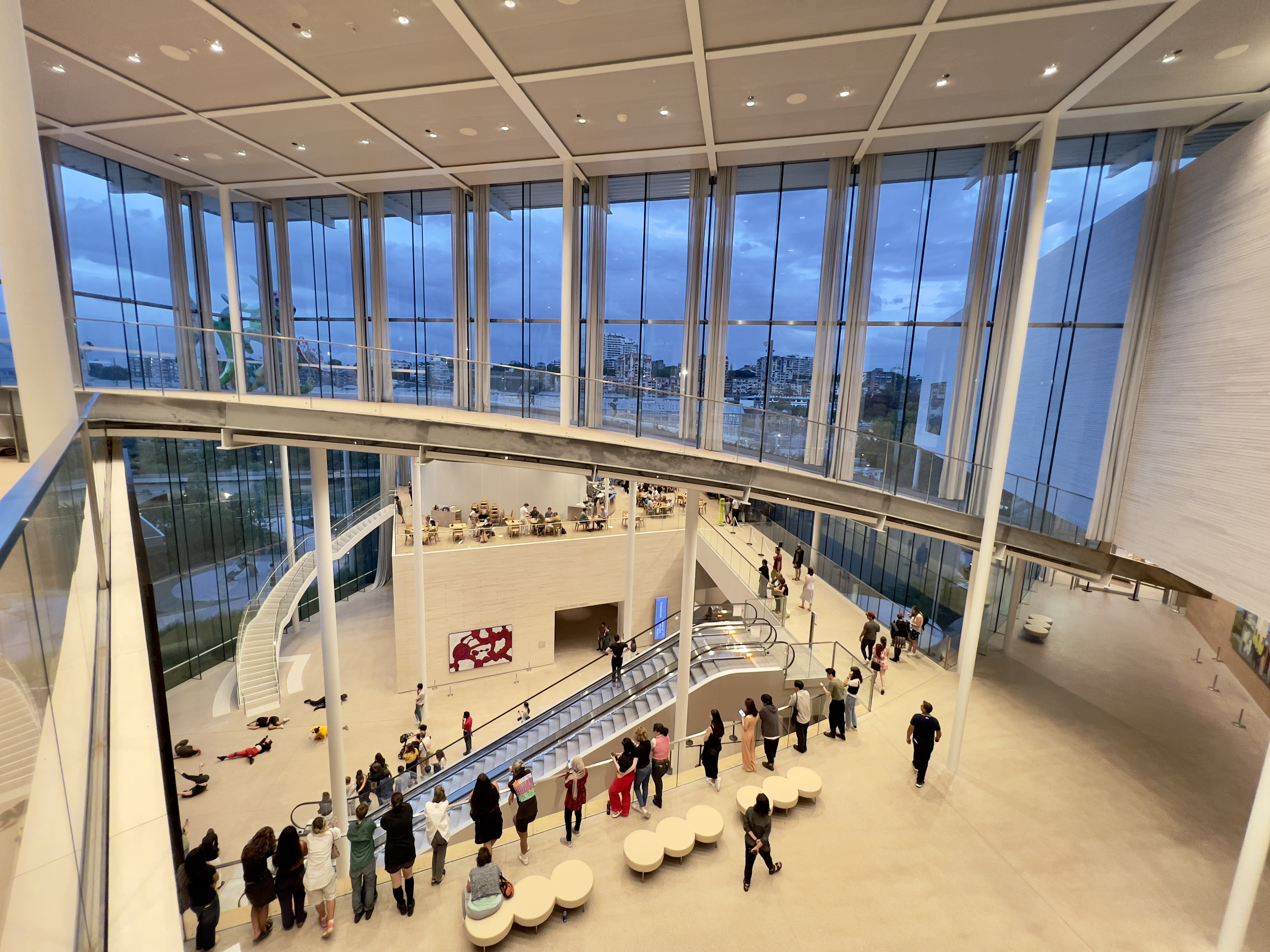
The atrium of the 'Sydney Modern' extension

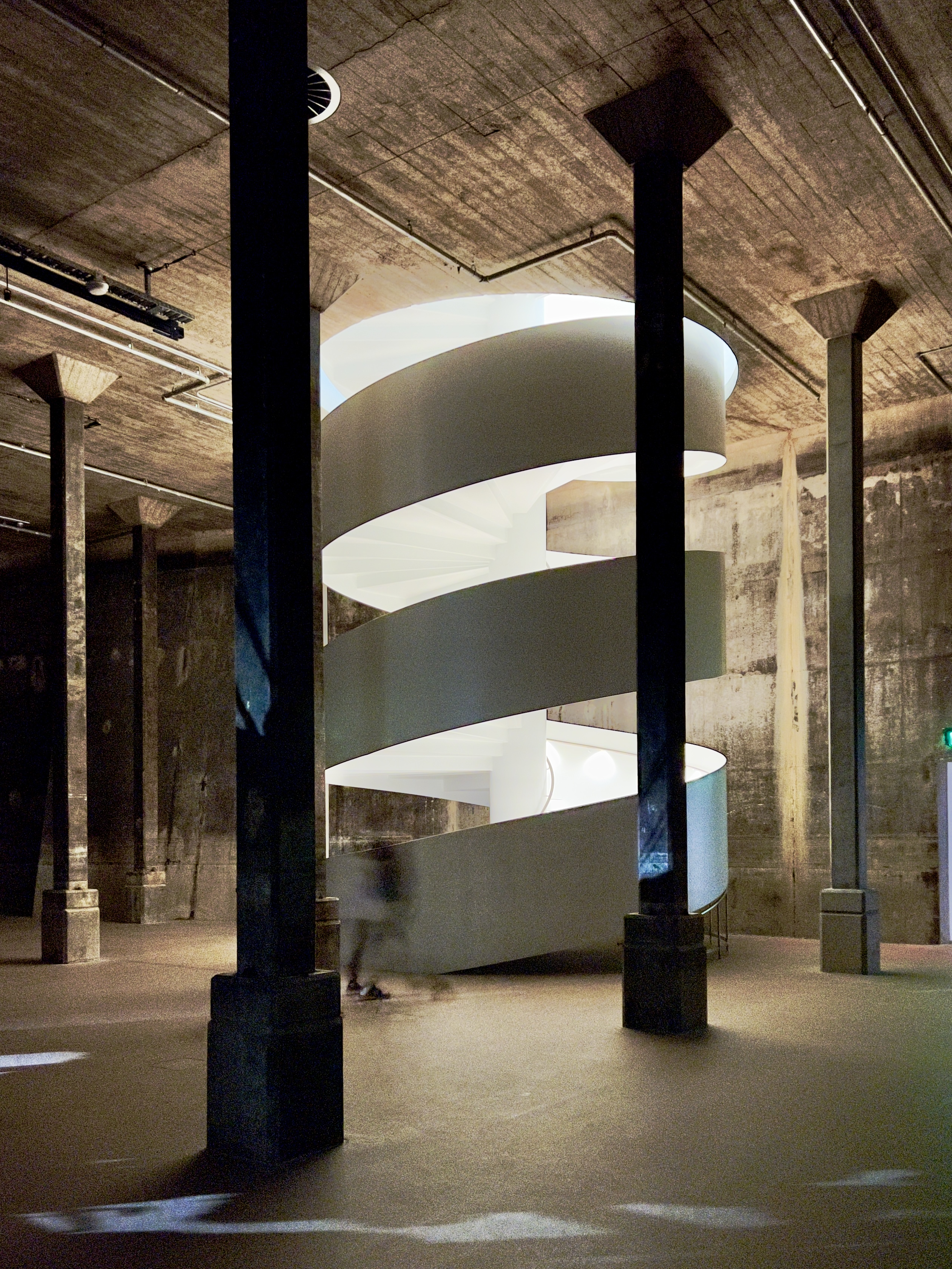
Staircase into the new, underground Tank gallery space in a disused oil bunker.

A competition to expand the gallery as part of the 'Sydney Modern' project was won in 2015 by Tokyo architects Kazuyo Sejima and Ryue Nishizawa of SANAA. The chosen design, which proposed a large extension to the north, was criticised on architectural as well as public interest grounds. Former architect Andersons described it as intrusive, 'colliding' with Vernon's sandstone façade and relegating his portico to a ceremonial entrance. Former Prime Minister Paul Keating criticised plans to significantly develop the outdoor spaces near the gallery for use as private venues as "about money, not art". The Foundation and Friends of the neighbouring Royal Botanic Garden objected to the proposed loss of green space and parkland in the adjacent Domain, requested a review and negotiated with the gallery about sight lines, transport, logistics and alignment of built structures.

The extension opened on 2 December 2022, almost doubling the gallery's exhibition space, to 16,000 square metres in total. The project cost $344 million in total, of which $244 million came from the NSW Government. The new spaces displayed a range of contemporary and installation works, with a particular focus on First Nations artwork. The new gallery did not adopt the 'Sydney Modern' project title as the permanent name of the new building, and at the time of its opening in 2022 a decision had not been made on what the new gallery would be called. The new, cascading exhibition spaces featured large windows with views onto Sydney Harbour, and converted a large underground oil bunker into a columned gallery spaced called 'The Tank'. In April 2024 it was announced the Sydney Modern (north building) would be called an Aboriginal name Naala Badu, meaning 'seeing waters' in the Sydney language. The whole of the south building is to be renamed Naala Nura, meaning 'seeing country'.

== Collections ==
In 1871 the collection started with the acquisition by The Art Society of some large works from Europe such as Ford Madox Brown's Chaucer at the Court of Edward III. Later they bought work from Australian artists such as Streeton's 1891 Fire's On, Roberts' 1894 The Golden Fleece and McCubbin's 1896 On the Wallaby Track.

In 2014 the collection is categorised into:

=== Aboriginal and Torres Strait Islander art ===
AGNSW did not have any Indigenous Australian art until the middle of the twentieth century. In 1948, it acquired a donation of bark and paper paintings from the 1948 American-Australian Scientific Expedition to Arnhem Land. Deputy director Tony Tuckson then started expanding the collection. In 1959 a series of 17 Pukamani grave posts from the Tiwi Islands were installed in the forecourt, which started to change public perception of Aboriginal art, as contemporary art. In October 1973 the Primitive Art Gallery opened, with Tuckson as curator. The first Indigenous curators were appointed in 1984.

Hetti Perkins worked at AGNSW from 1989, as the senior curator of Aboriginal and Torres Strait Islander art at the gallery from around 1998 until 2011, when she resigned. She was responsible for some major exhibitions and initiatives during her time there.

Perkins worked on the establishment of the Yiribana Gallery, dedicated to Aboriginal and Torres Strait Islander art, which opened in 1994.

The AGNSW collection represents Indigenous artists from communities across Australia. The earliest work in the collection, by Tommy McRae, dates from the late 19th century. Included in the collection are desert paintings created by small family groups living on remote Western Desert outstation, bark paintings of the saltwater people of coastal communities, and the new media expressions of "blak city culture" by contemporary artists.

=== Asian art ===
The first works to enter the collection in 1879 were a large group of ceramics and bronzes – a gift from the Government of Japan following the Sydney International Exhibition that year. The Asian collections after grown from that beginning to be wide-ranging, embracing the countries and cultures of South, Southeast and East Asia.

=== Australian art ===
The collection dates from the early 1800s. 19th-century Australian artists represented include: John Glover, Arthur Streeton, Eugene von Guerard, John Russell, Tom Roberts, David Davies, Charles Conder, William Piguenit, E. Phillips Fox (including Nasturtiums), Frederick McCubbin, Sydney Long and George W. Lambert.

20th-century Australian artists represented include: Arthur Boyd, Rupert Bunny, Grace Cossington Smith, H. H. Calvert, William Dobell, Russell Drysdale, James Gleeson, Sidney Nolan, John Olsen, Margaret Preston, Hugh Ramsay, Lloyd Rees, Imants Tillers, J. W. Tristram, Roland Wakelin, Brett Whiteley, Fred Williams and Blamire Young.

Forty four works held at the gallery were included in the 1973 edition of 100 Masterpieces of Australian Painting.

==== Selected works ====
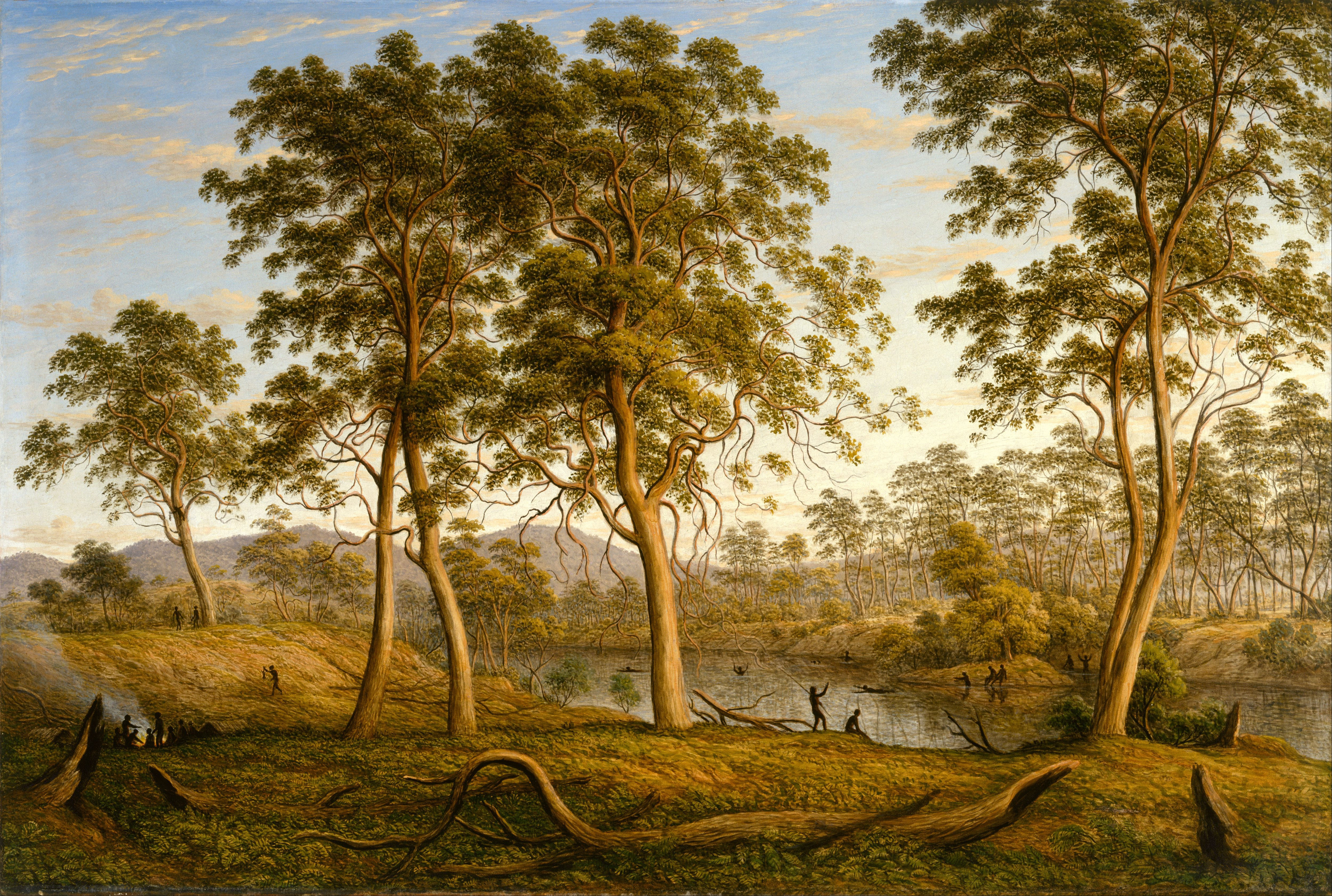
John Glover, Natives on the Ouse River, Van Diemen's Land, 1838

Arthur Streeton, Fire's on, 1891

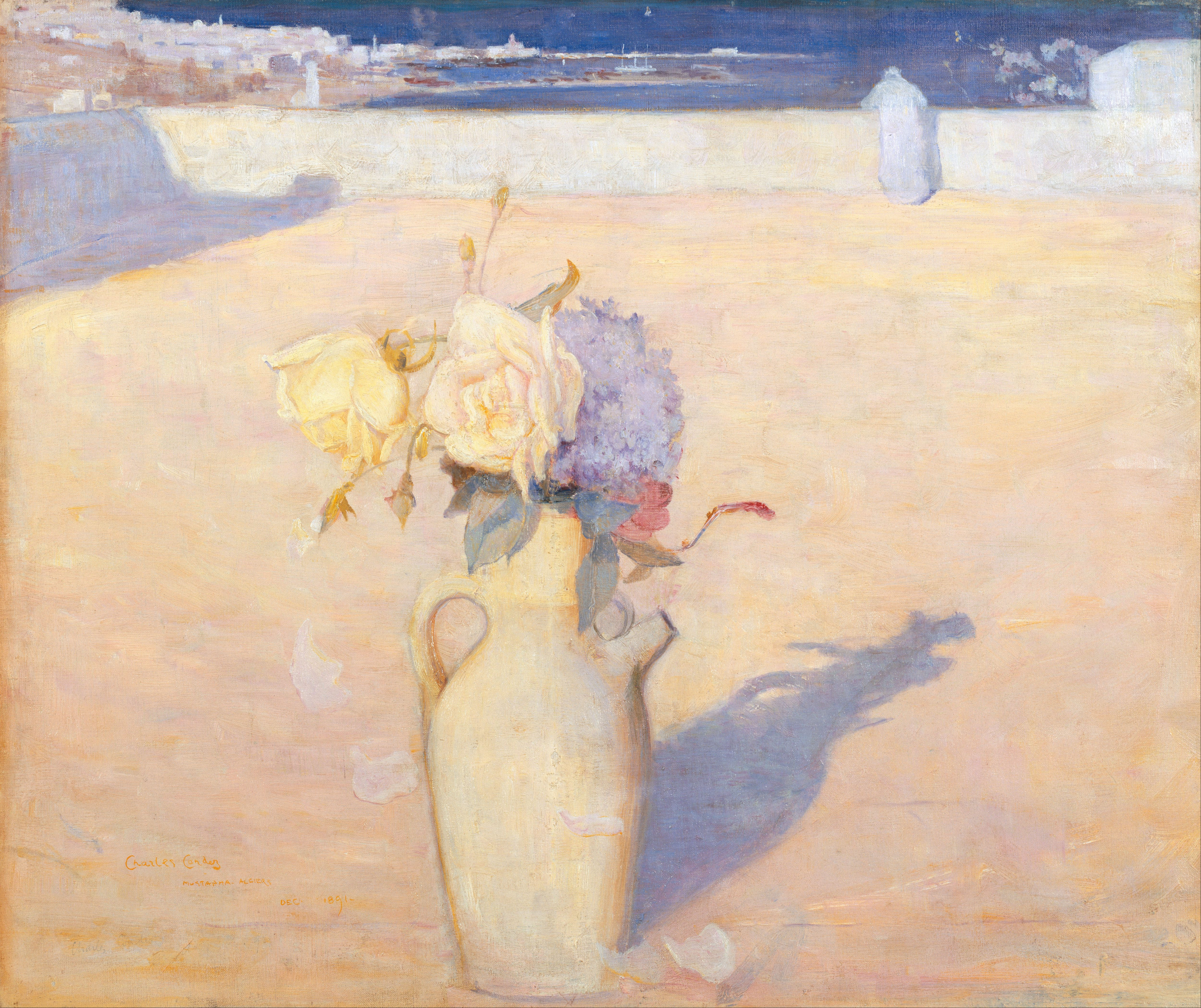
Charles Conder, The hot sands, Mustapha, Algiers, 1891

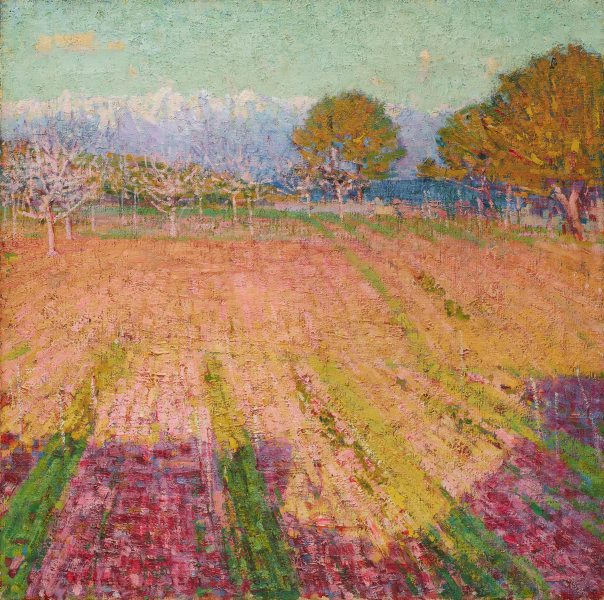
John Russell, In the Afternoon, 1891

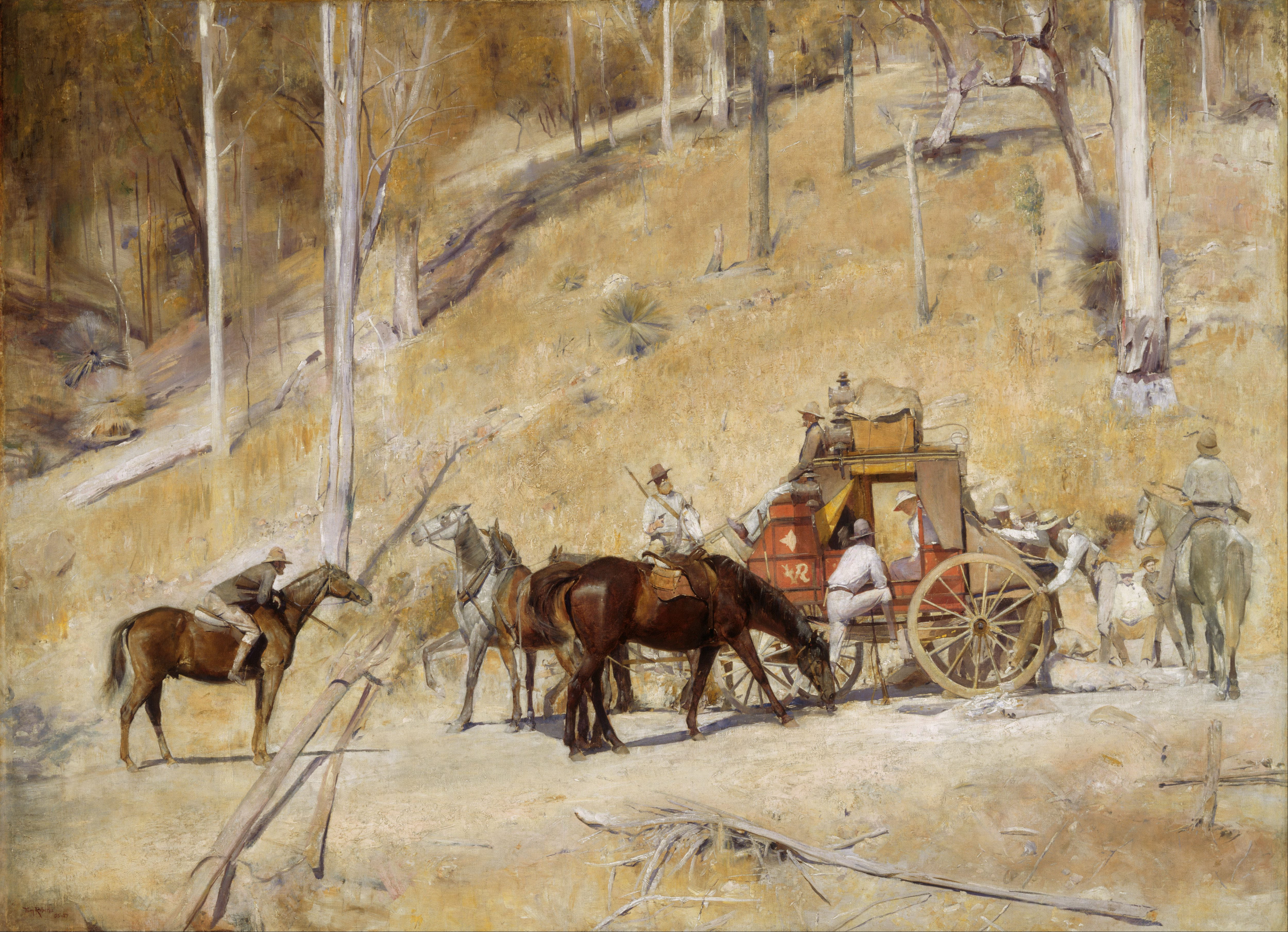
Tom Roberts, Bailed Up, 1895

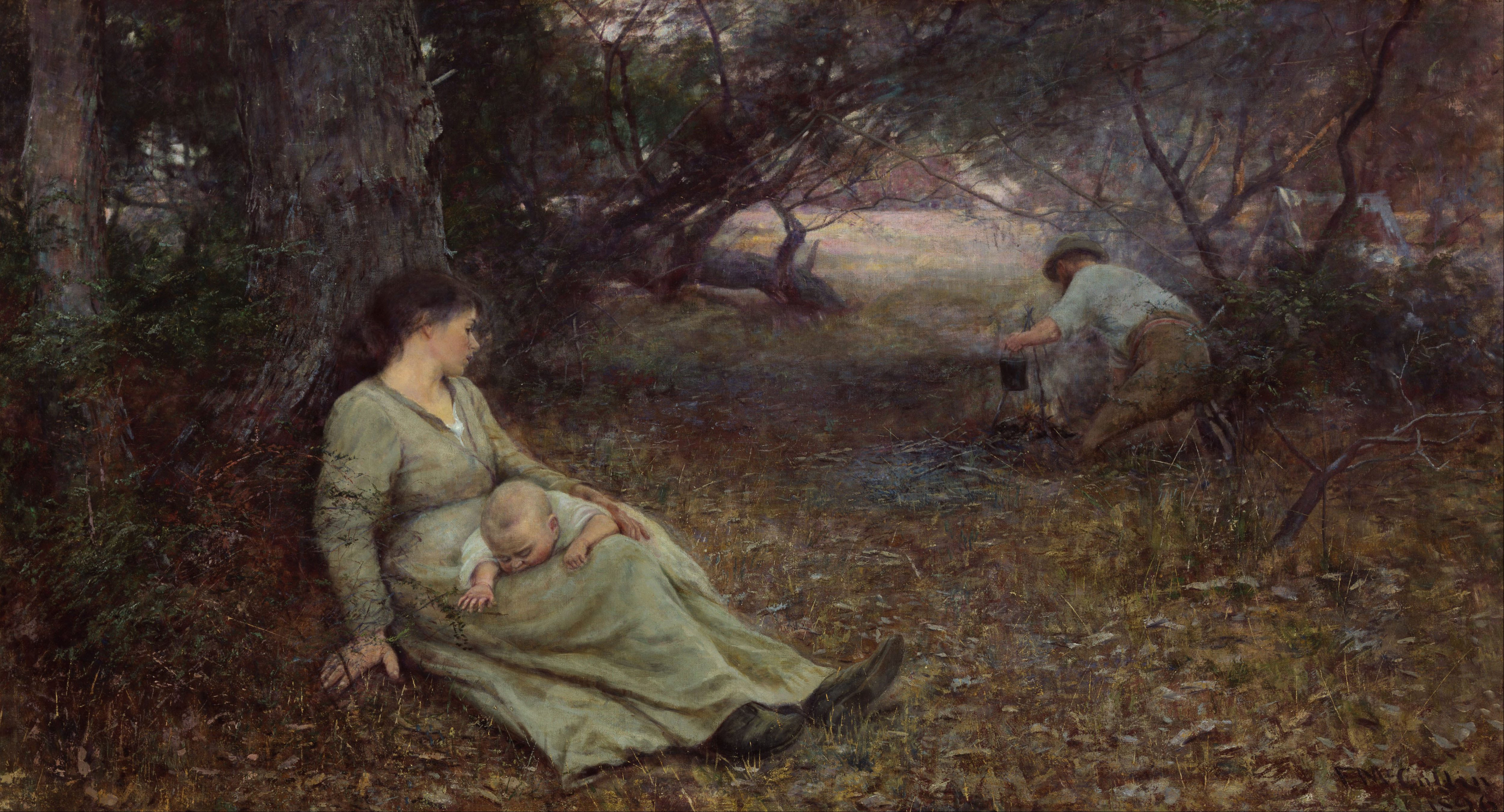
Frederick McCubbin, On the Wallaby Track, 1896

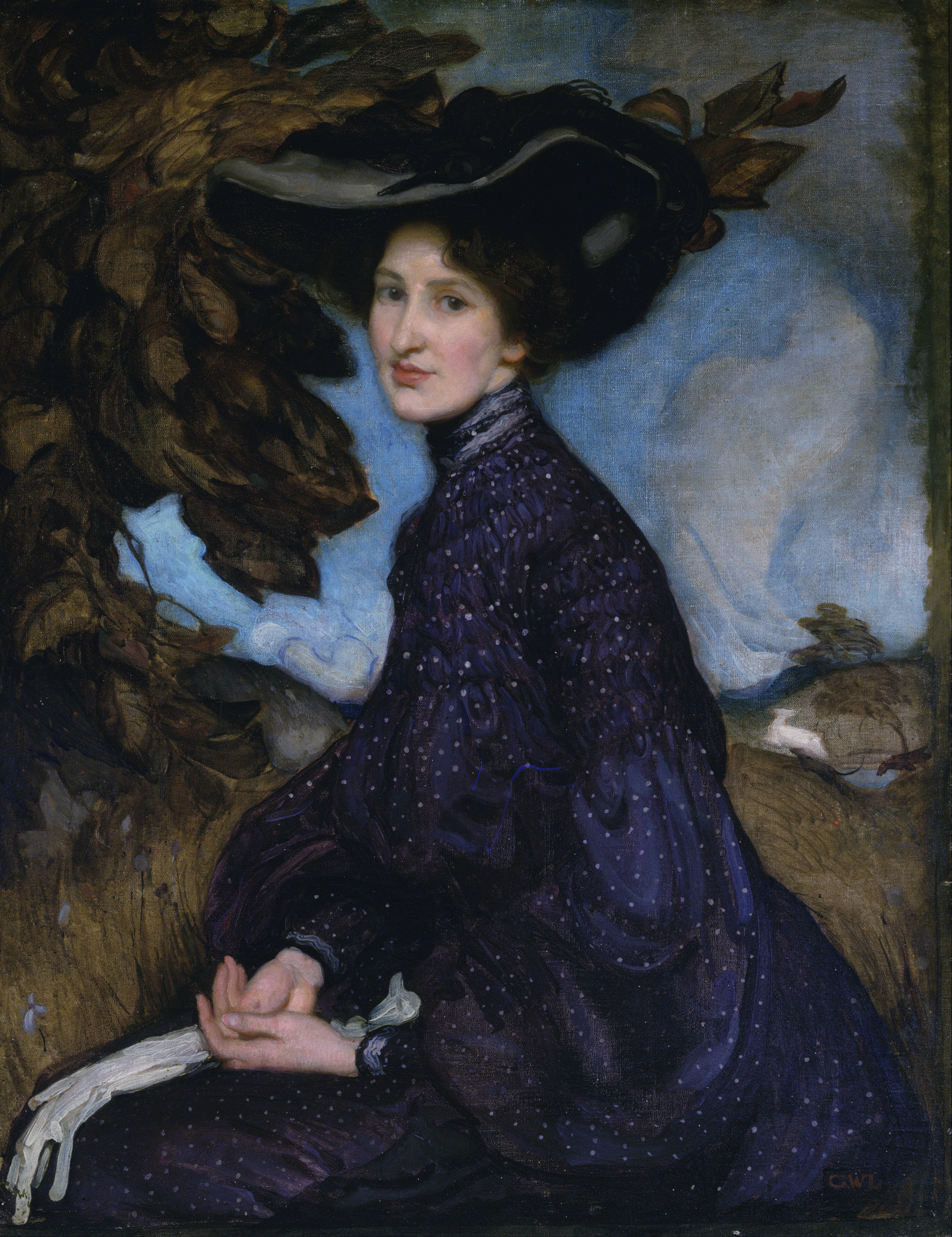
George Washington Lambert, Thea Proctor, 1903

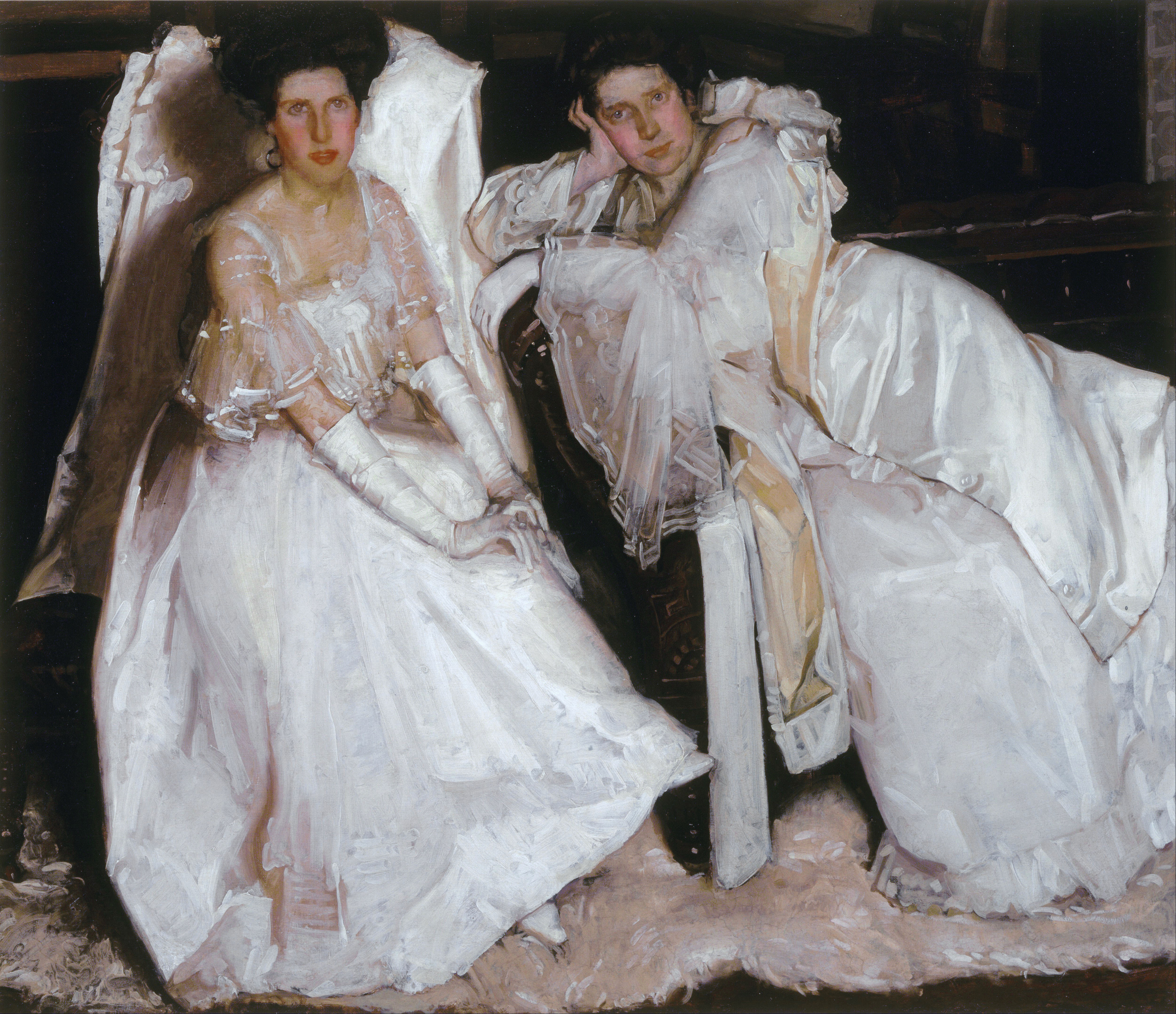
Hugh Ramsay, The Sisters, 1904

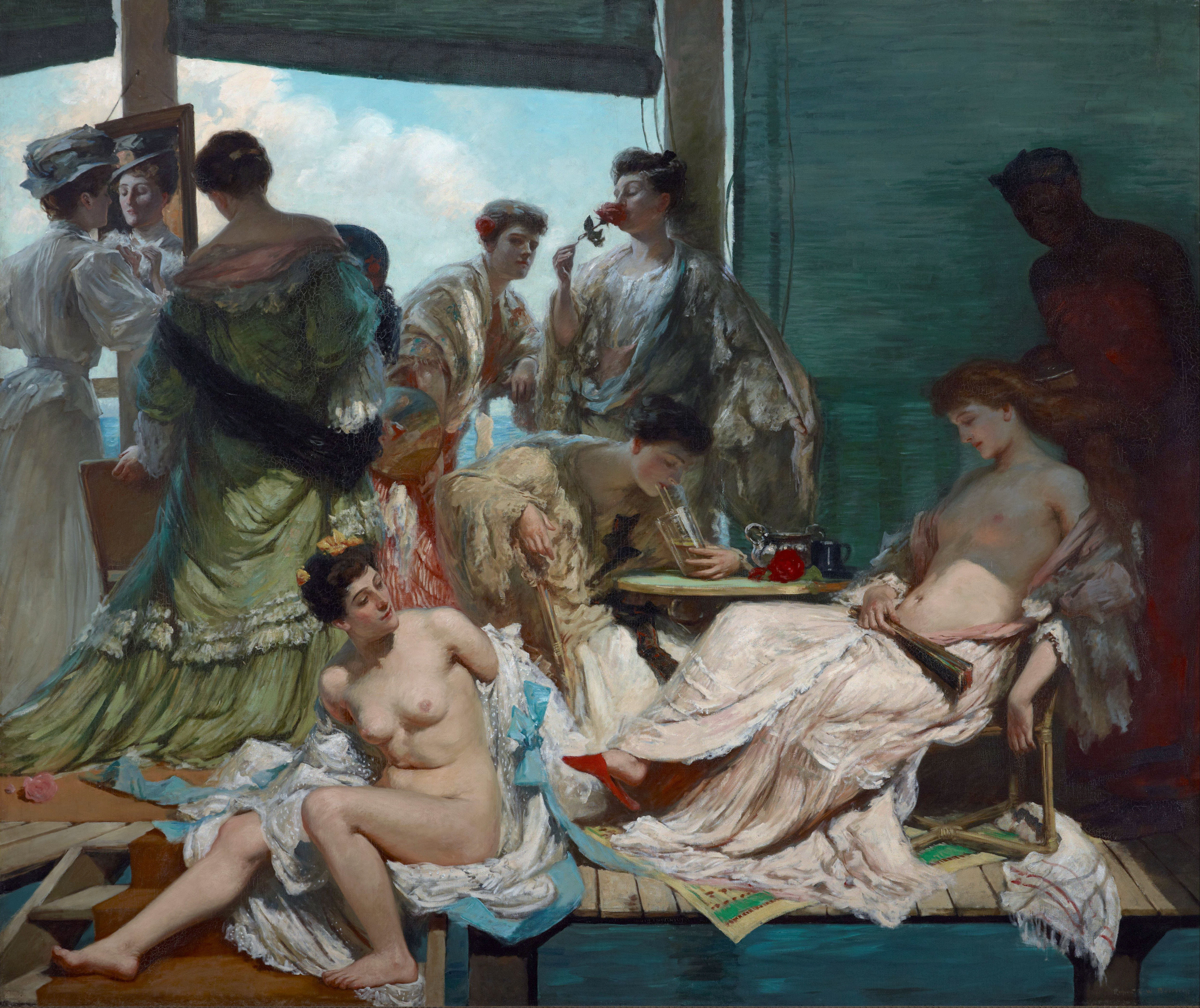
Rupert Bunny, Summer time, 1907

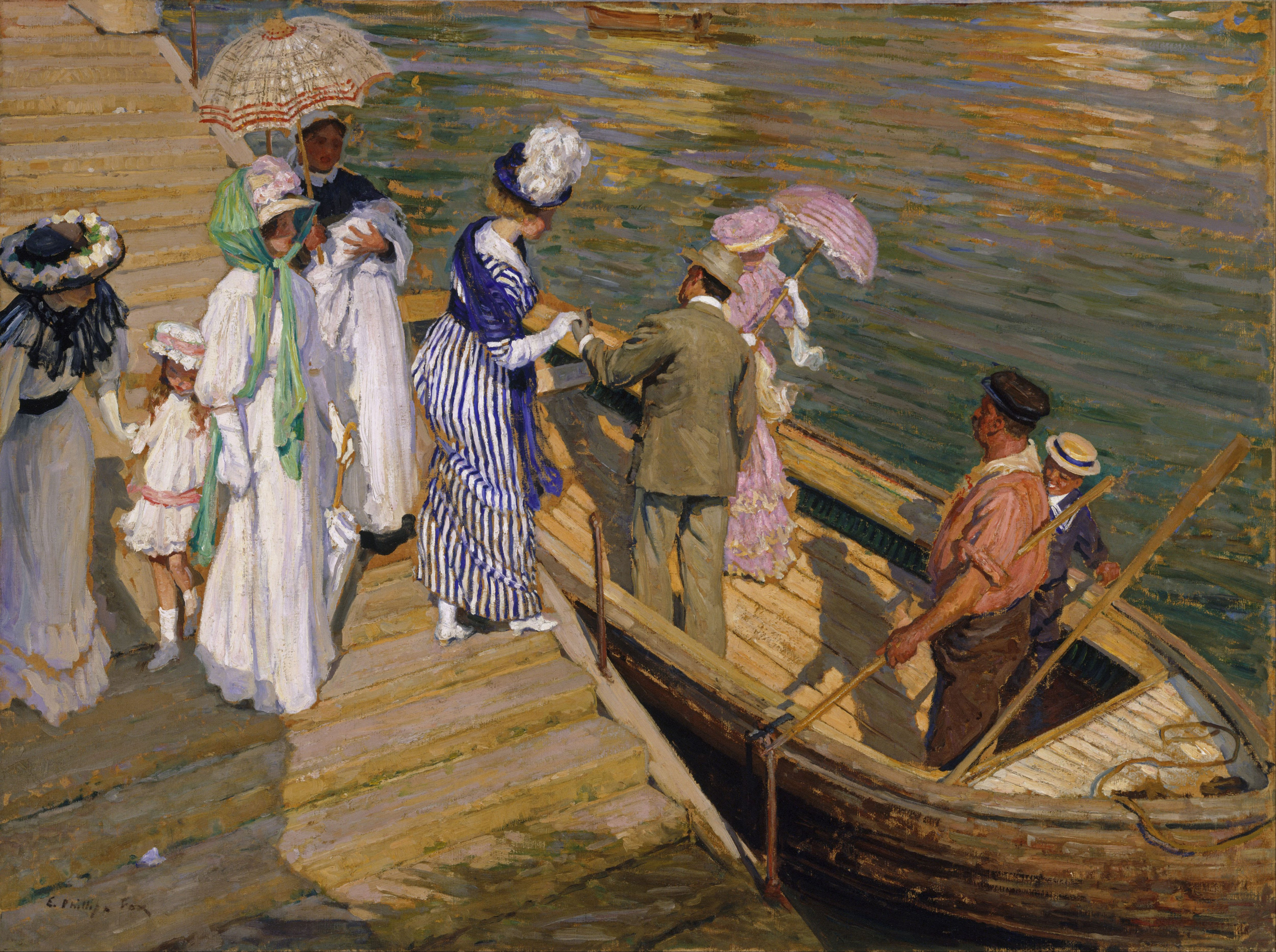
E. Phillips Fox, The Ferry, 1910

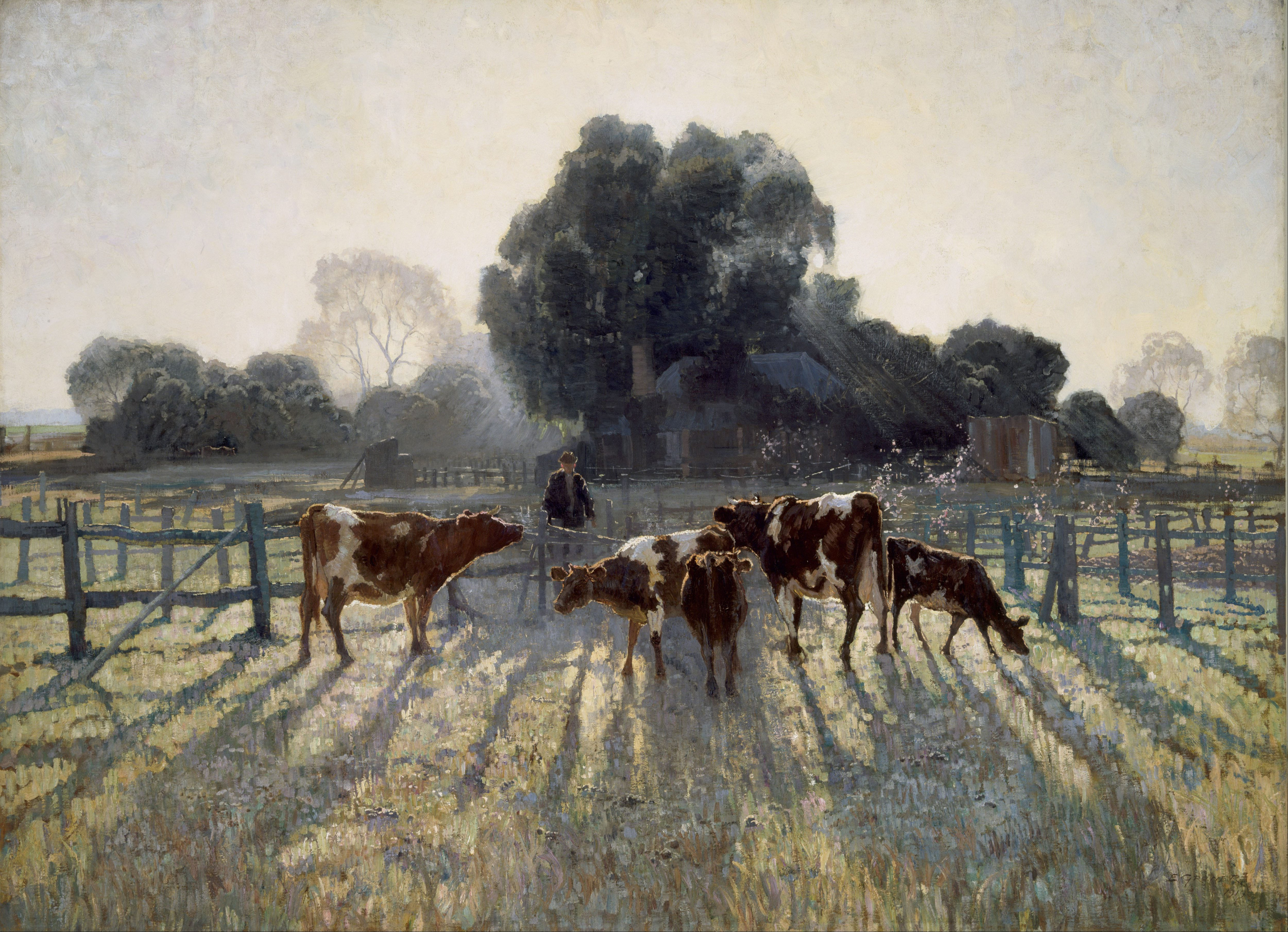
Elioth Gruner, Spring Frost, 1919

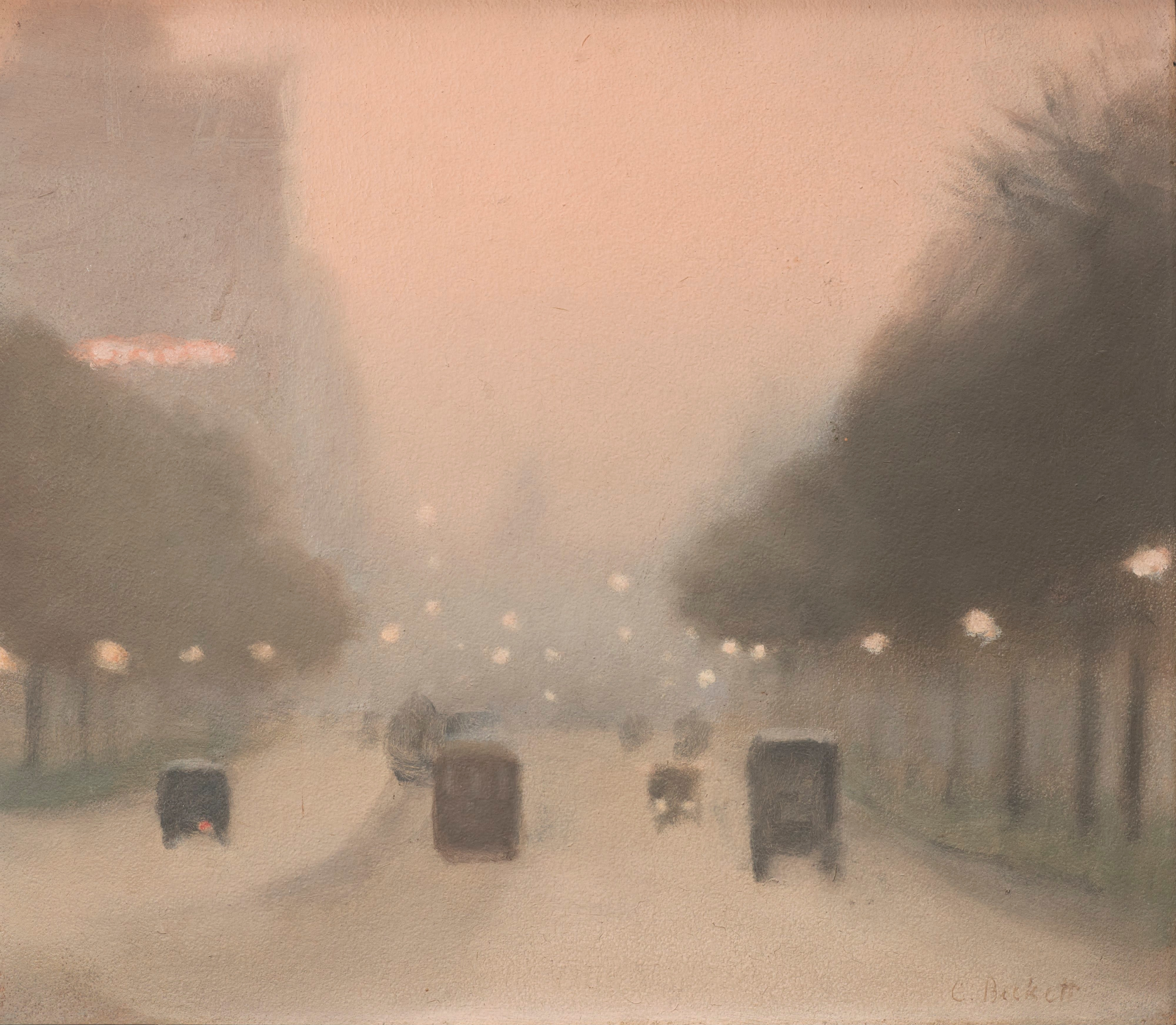
Clarice Beckett, Evening, St Kilda Road, 1930

=== Contemporary art ===
The contemporary collection is international, encompassing Asian and Western as well as Australian art in all media. With the gift of the John Kaldor Family Collection, the gallery now holds arguably Australia's most comprehensive representation of contemporary art from the 1960s to the present day. Internationally, the focus is on the influence of conceptual art, nouveau realisme, minimalism and arte povera. The Australian contemporary art collection focuses on abstract painting, expressionism, screen culture and pop art.

=== Pacific art ===
The collection of art from the Pacific region began in 1962 at the instigation of our then deputy director, Tony Tuckson. Between 1968 and 1977, the gallery acquired over 500 works from the Moriarty Collection, one of the largest and most important private collections of New Guinea Highlands art in the world.

=== Photography ===
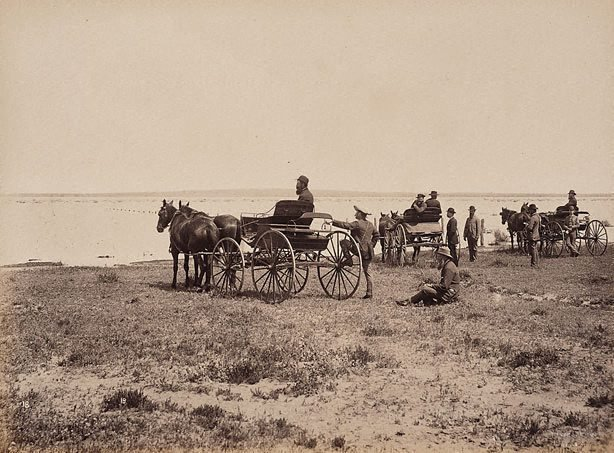
Charles Bayliss, Lake Woytchugga near Wilcannia (1886)

The photography collection has major holdings of a wide variety of artists including Tracey Moffatt, Bill Henson, Fiona Hall, Micky Allan, Mark Johnson, Max Pam and Lewis Morley. As well as contemporary photography, Australian pictorialism, modernism and postwar photo documentary is represented by The Sydney Camera Circle, Max Dupain and David Moore. The evolution of 19th-century Australian photography is represented with emphasis on the work of Charles Bayliss and Kerry & Co. International photographs include English pictorialism and the European avant garde (Bauhaus, constructivism and surrealism). Photo-documentary in 20th-century America is reflected through the work of Lewis Hine and Dorothea Lange among others. Contemporary Asian practices are represented by artists such as Yasumasa Morimura and Miwa Yanagi. Styles range from the formal aesthetics of early photography to the informal snapshots of Weegee to the high fashion of Helmut Newton and Bettina Rheims.

=== Western art ===
The gallery has an extensive collection of British Victorian art, including major works by Lord Frederic Leighton and Sir Edward John Poynter. It has smaller holdings of European art of the 15th to 18th centuries, including works by Peter Paul Rubens, Canaletto, Bronzino, Domenico Beccafumi, Giovanni Battista Moroni and Niccolò dell'Abbate. These works hang in the Grand Courts along with 19th-century works by Eugène Delacroix, John Constable, Ford Madox Brown, Vincent van Gogh, Auguste Rodin, Claude Monet, Paul Cézanne and Camille Pissarro.

British art of the 20th century occupies a significant place in the collection together with major European figures such as Pierre Bonnard, Georges Braque, Pablo Picasso, Auguste Rodin, Ernst Ludwig Kirchner, Alberto Giacometti and Giorgio Morandi.

==== Selected works ====
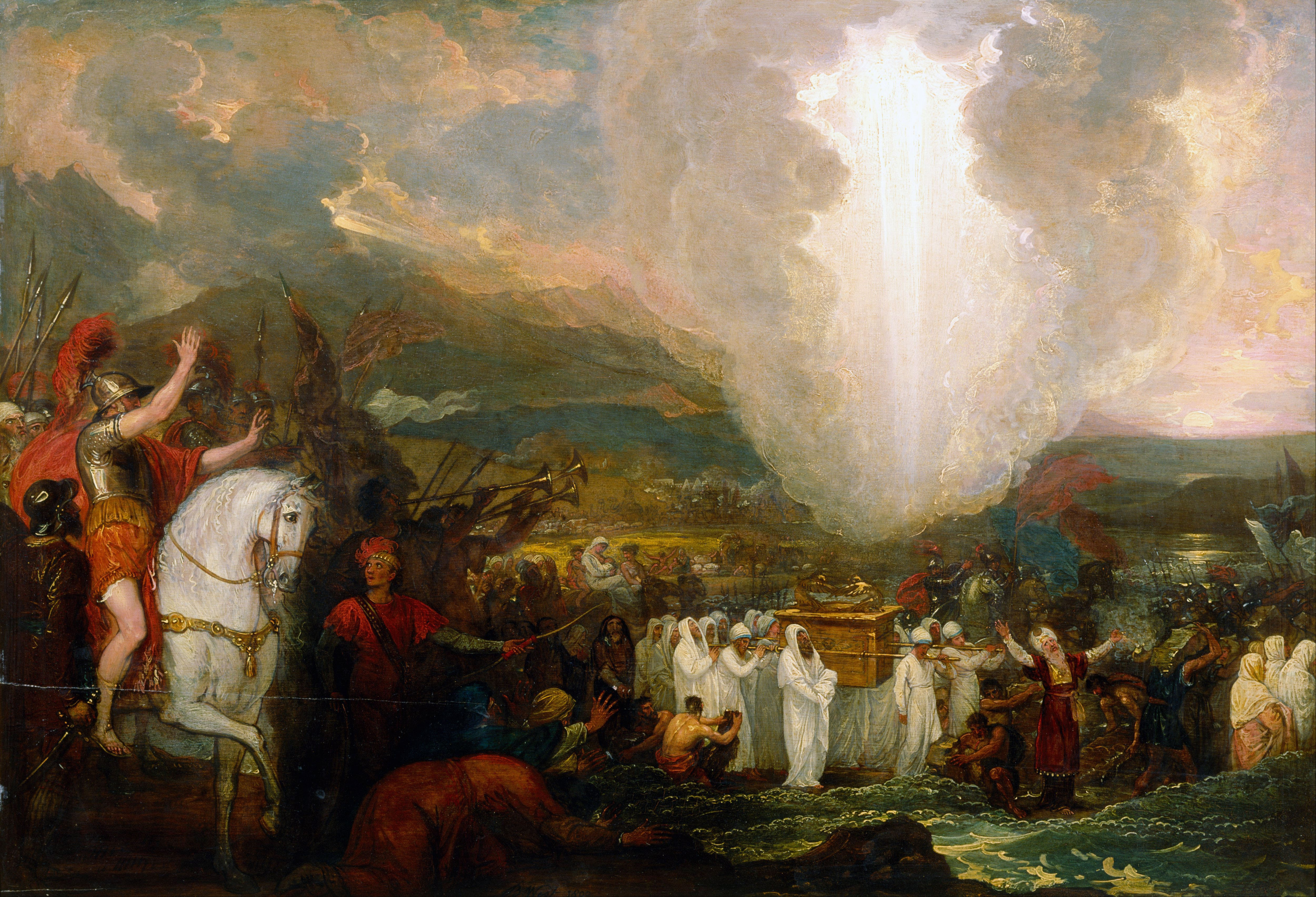
Benjamin West, Joshua passing the River Jordan with the Ark of the Covenant, 1800

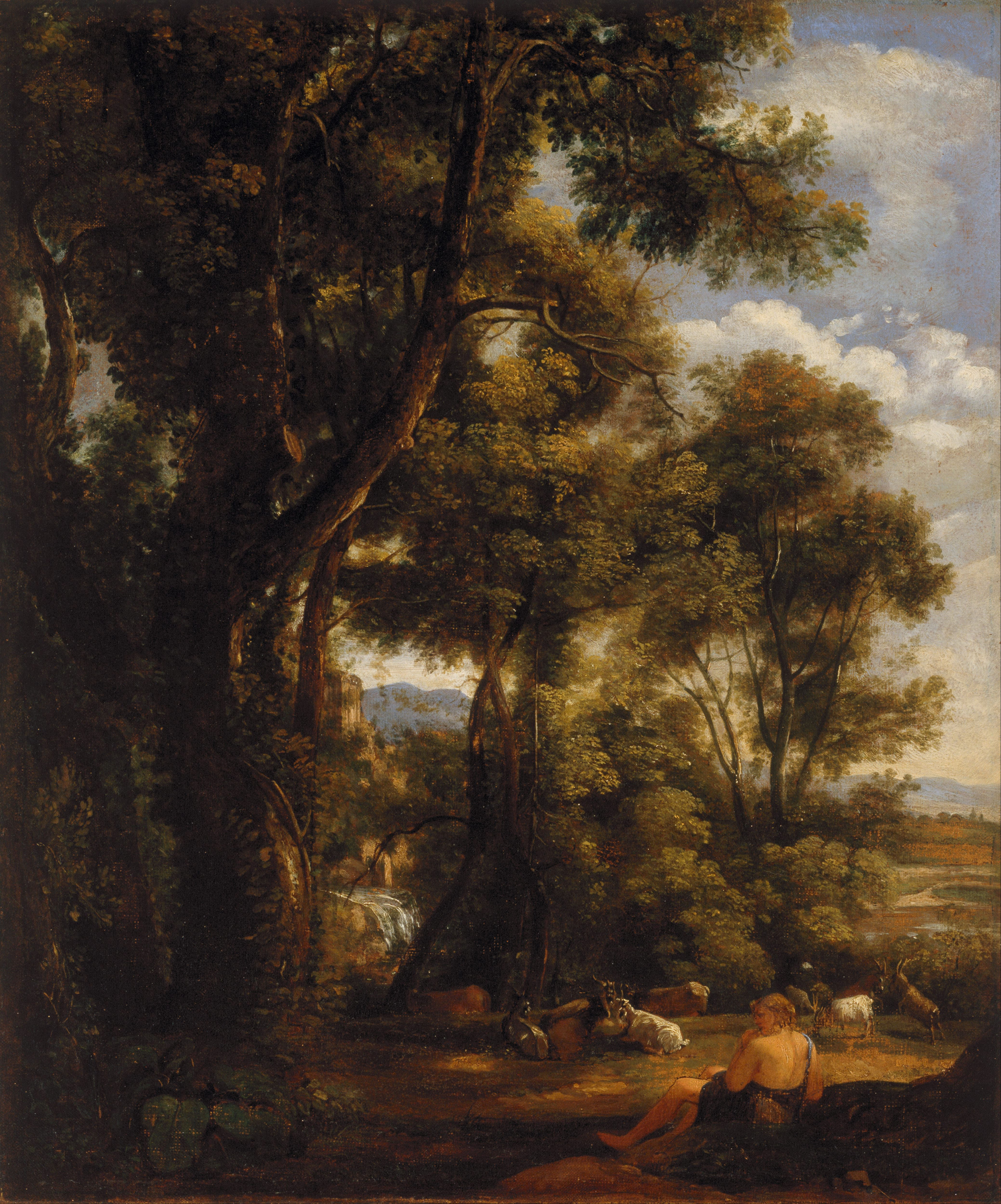
John Constable, Landscape with goatherd and goats, 1823

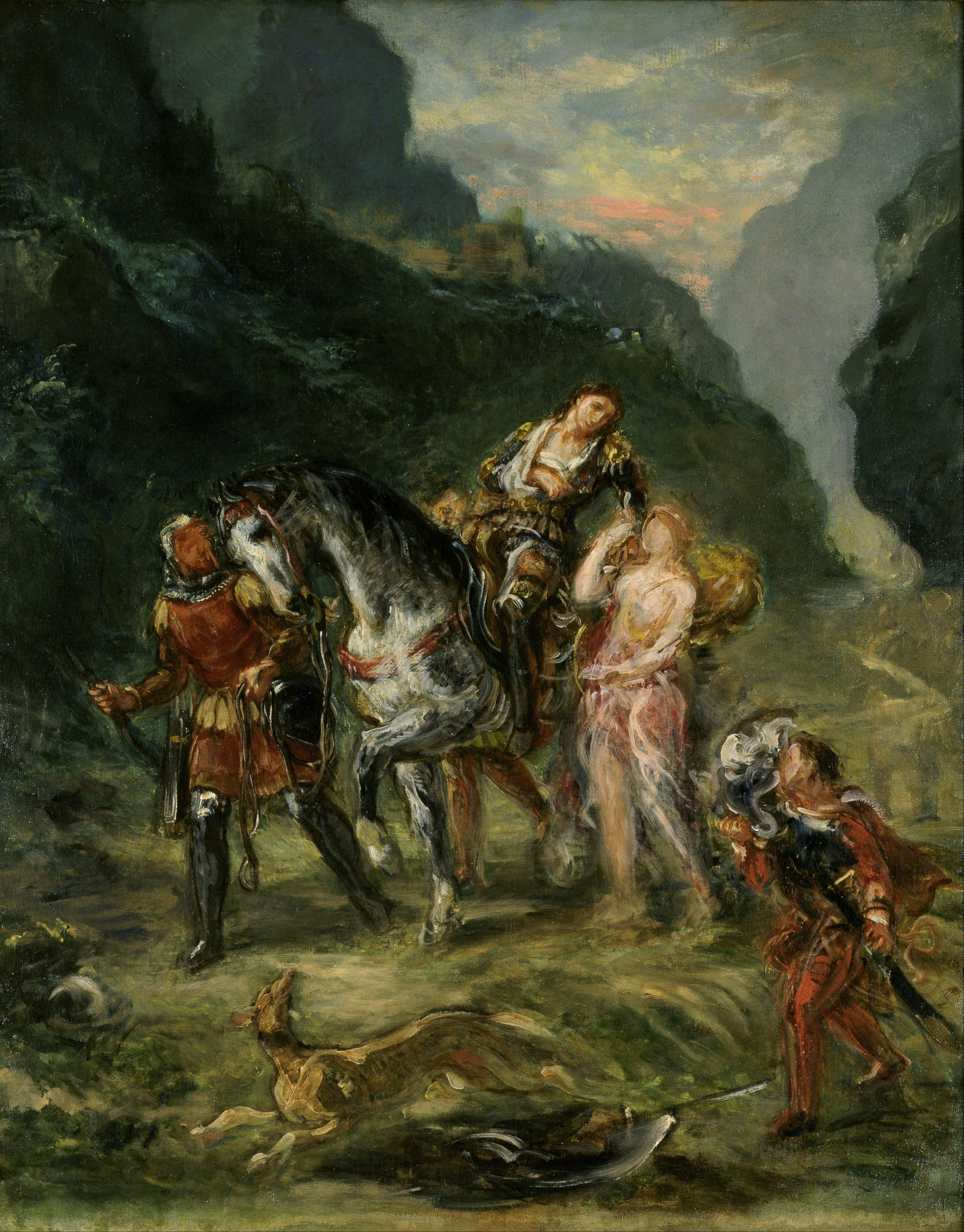
Eugène Delacroix, Angelica and the wounded Medoro, 1860

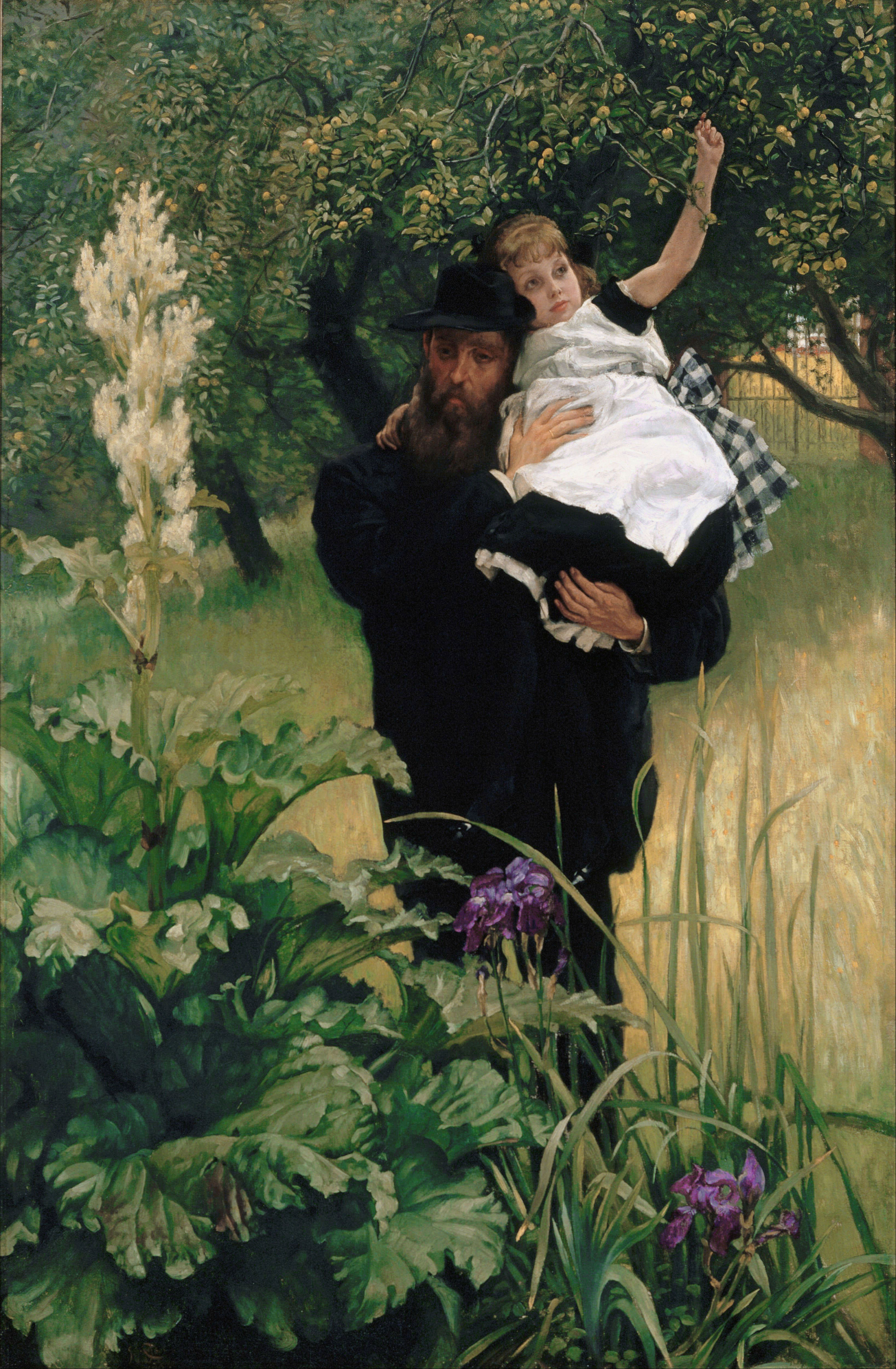
James Tissot, The Widower, 1876

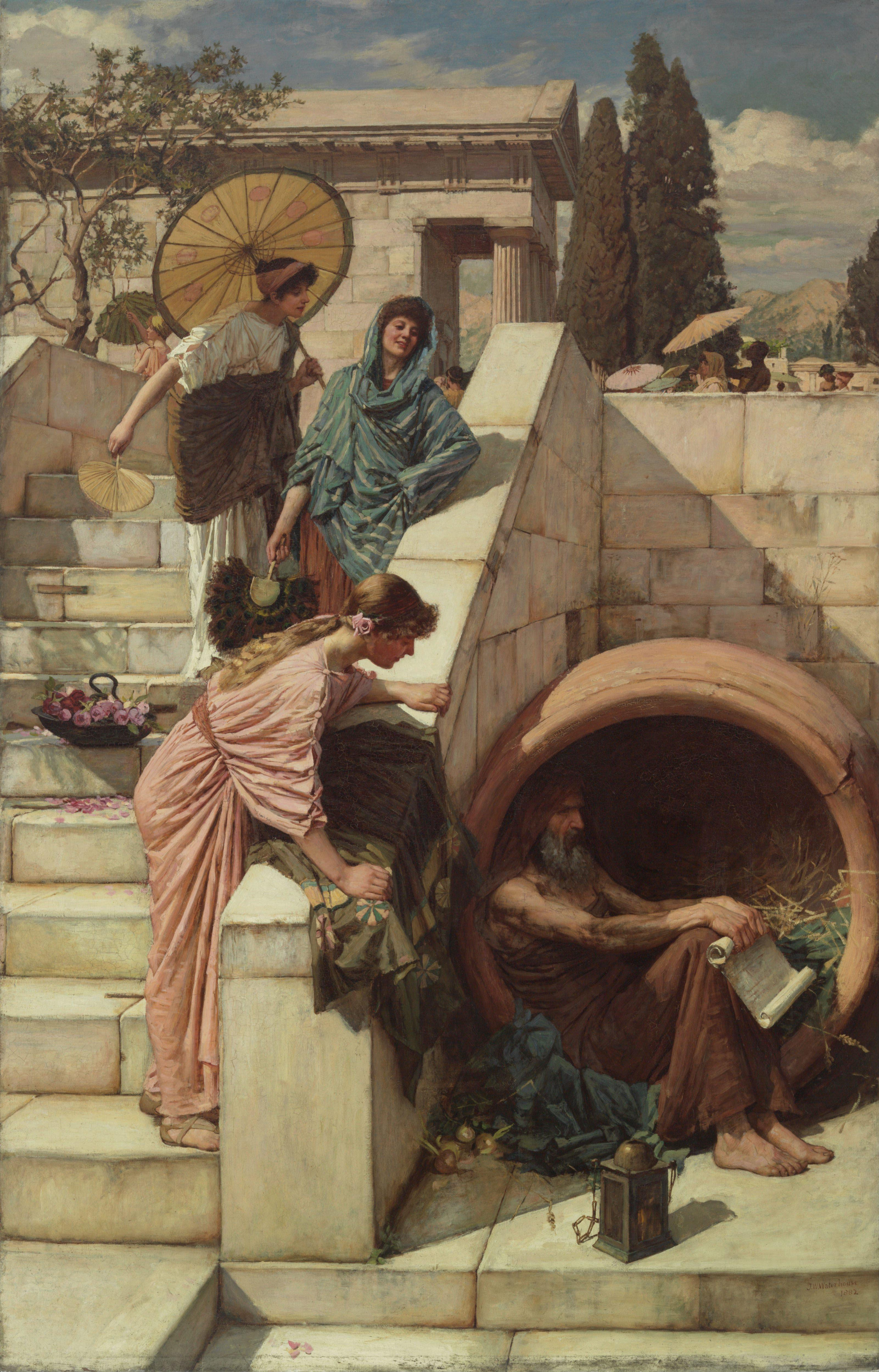
John William Waterhouse, Diogenes , 1882

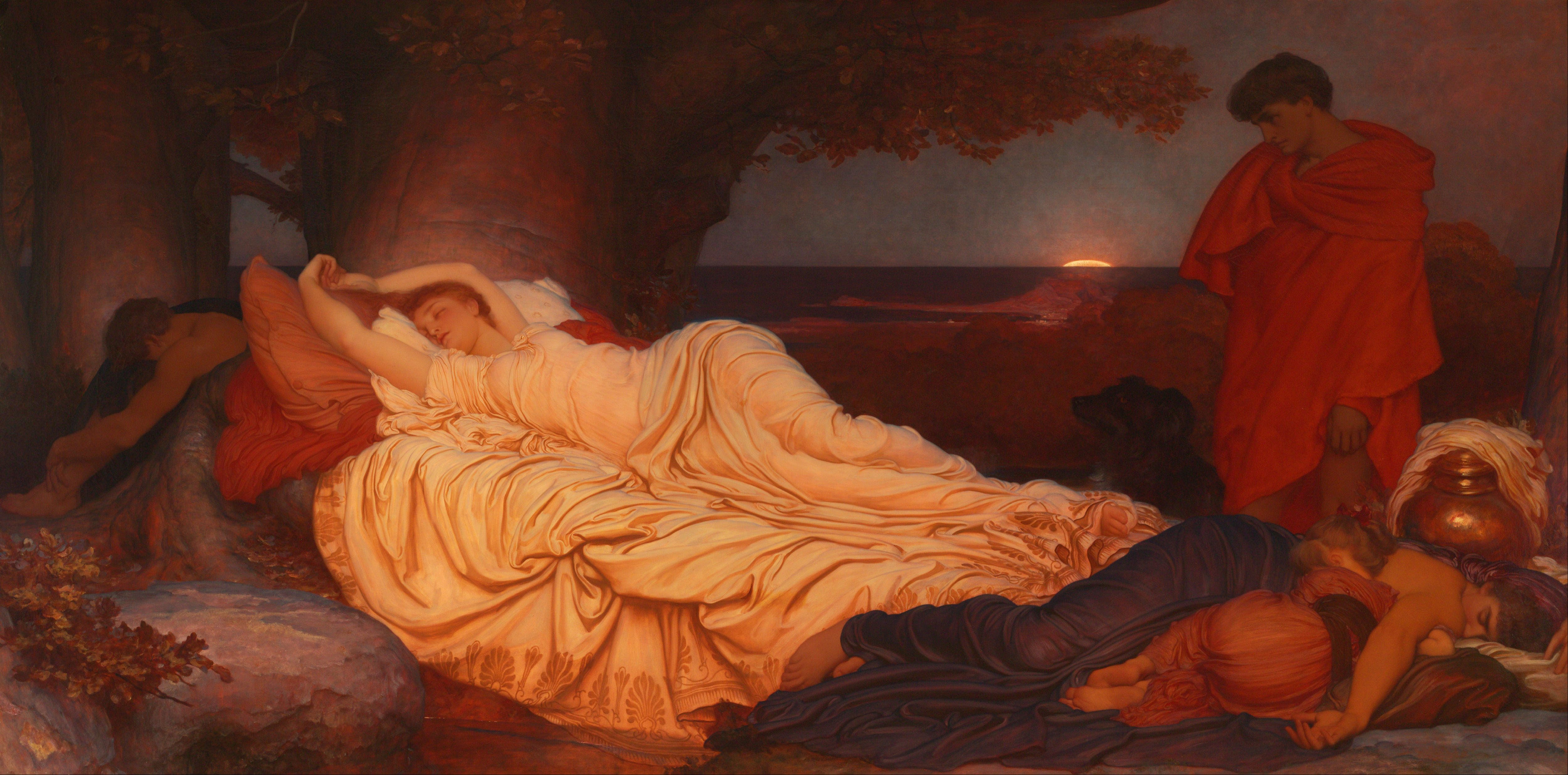
Lord Frederic Leighton, Cymon and Iphigenia, 1884

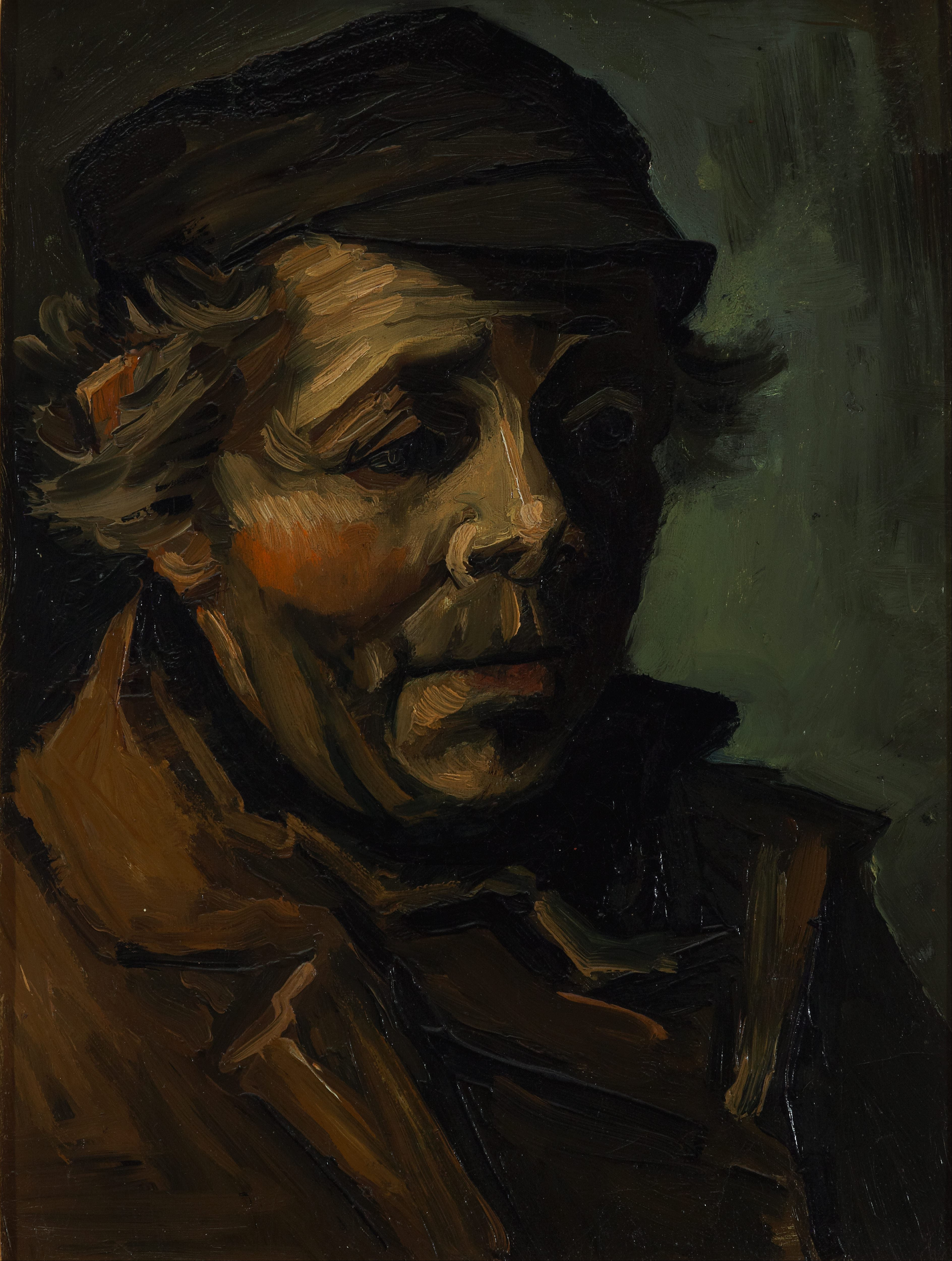
Vincent van Gogh, Head of a Peasant, 1884

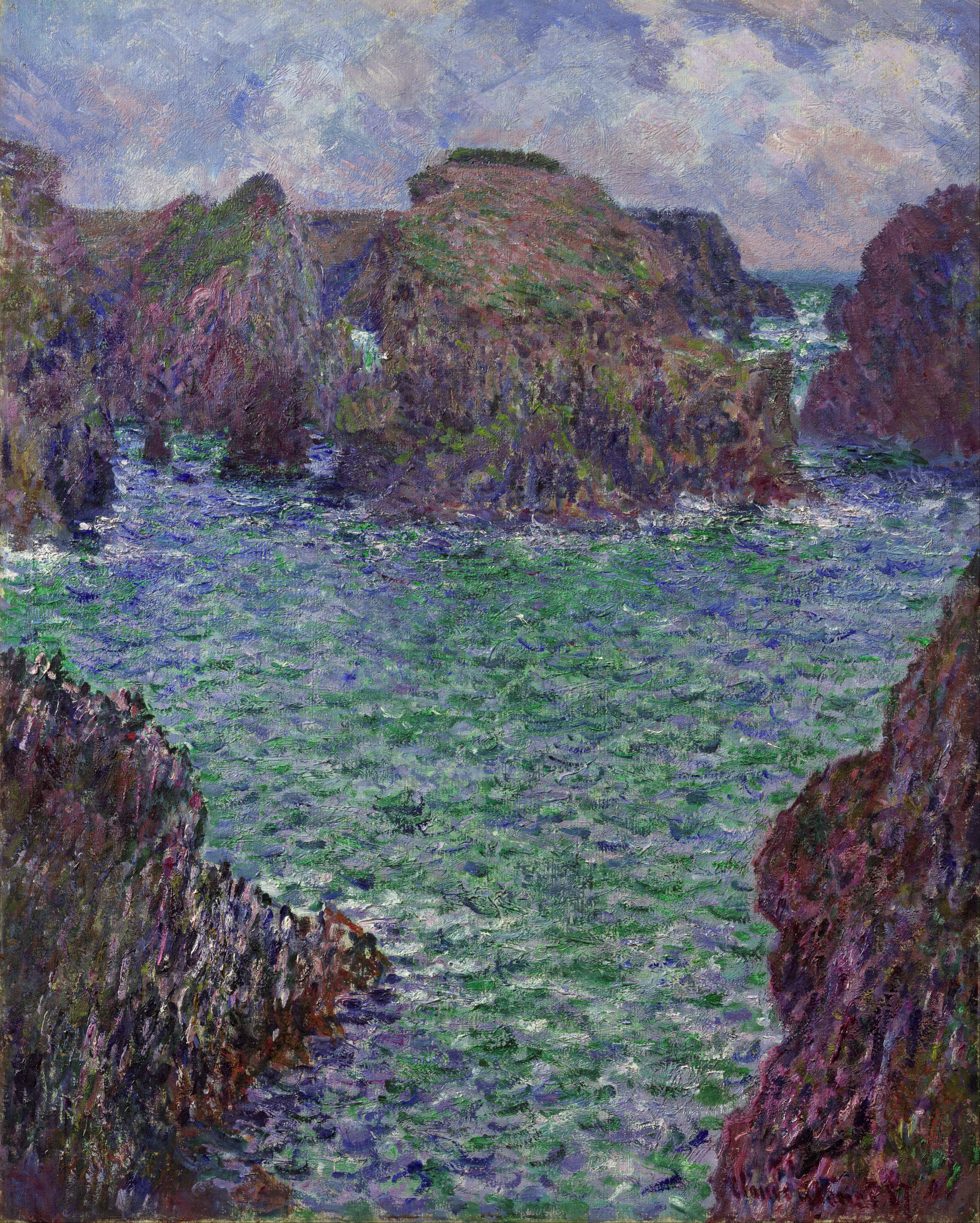
Claude Monet, Port-Goulphar, Belle-Île, 1887

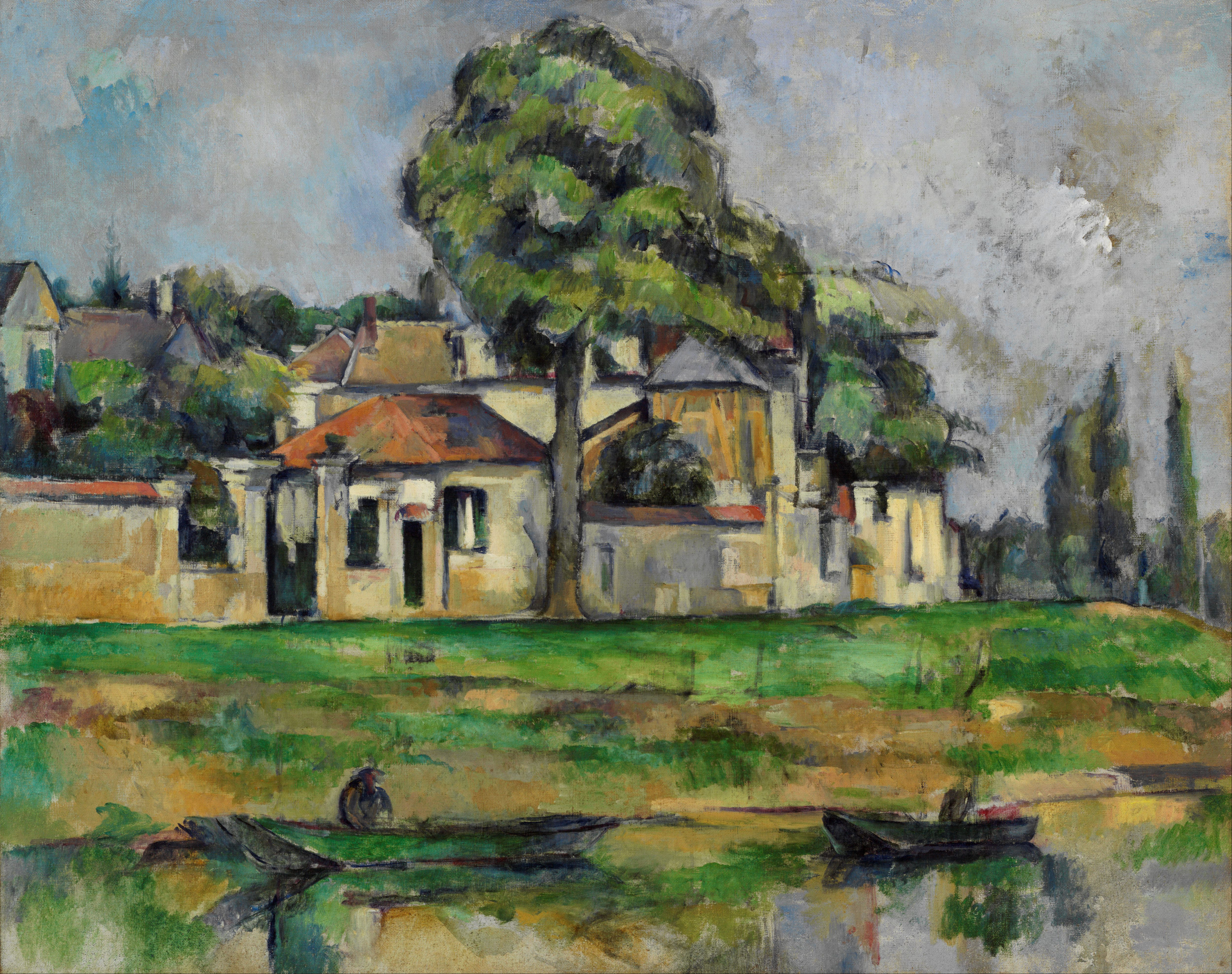
Paul Cézanne, Banks of the Marne, 1888

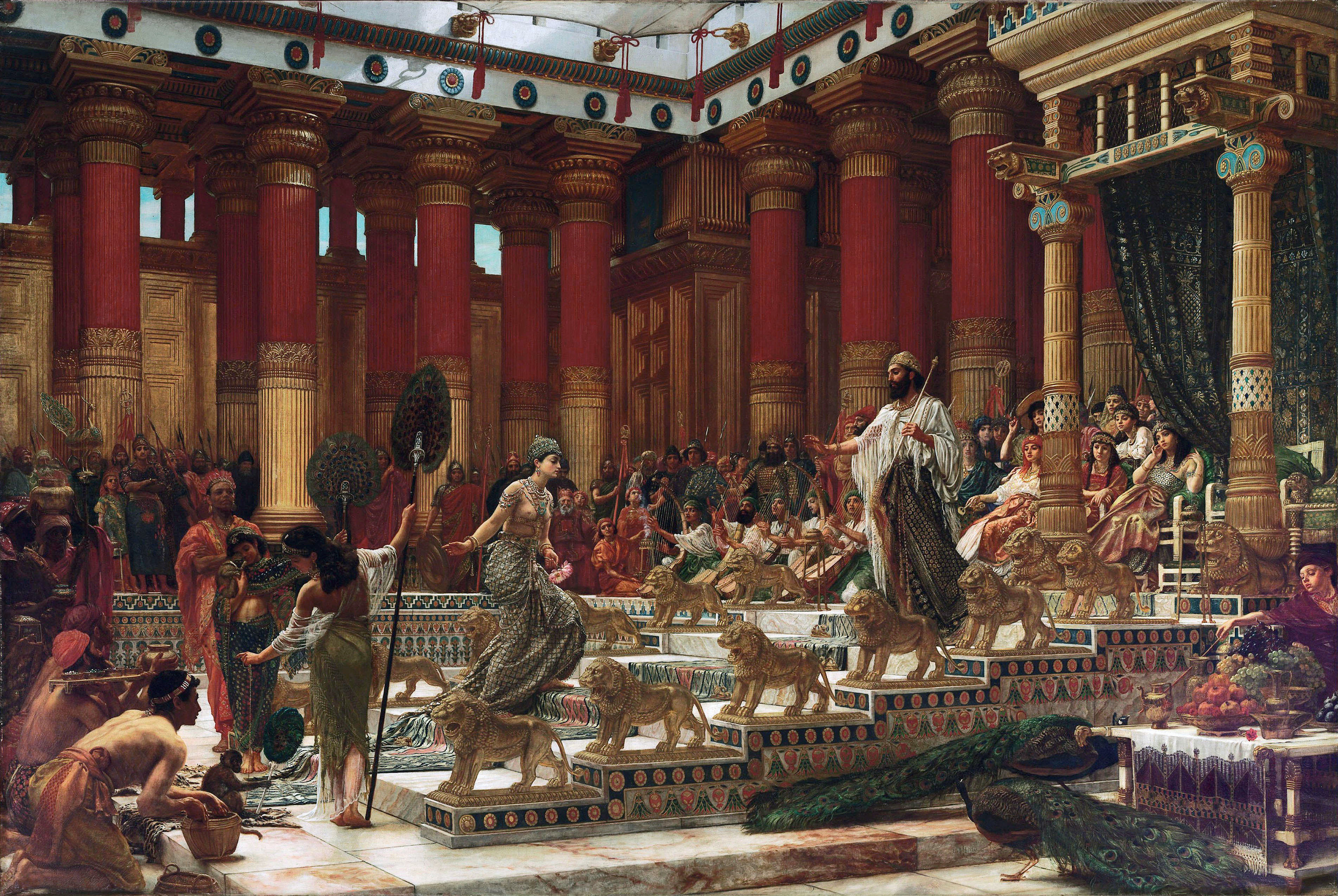
Edward Poynter, The Visit of the Queen of Sheba to King Solomon, 1890

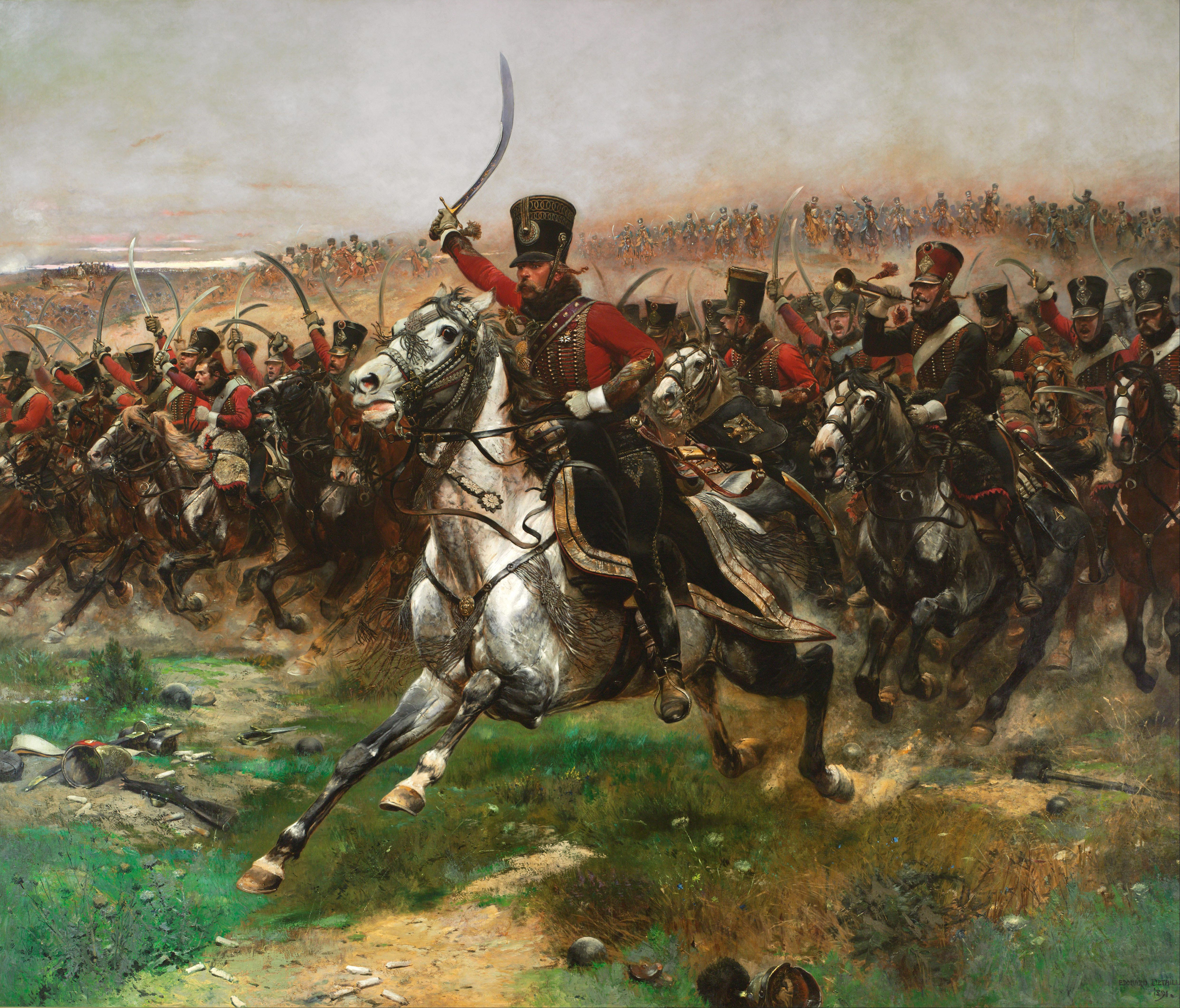
Édouard Detaille, Vive L'Empereur, 1891

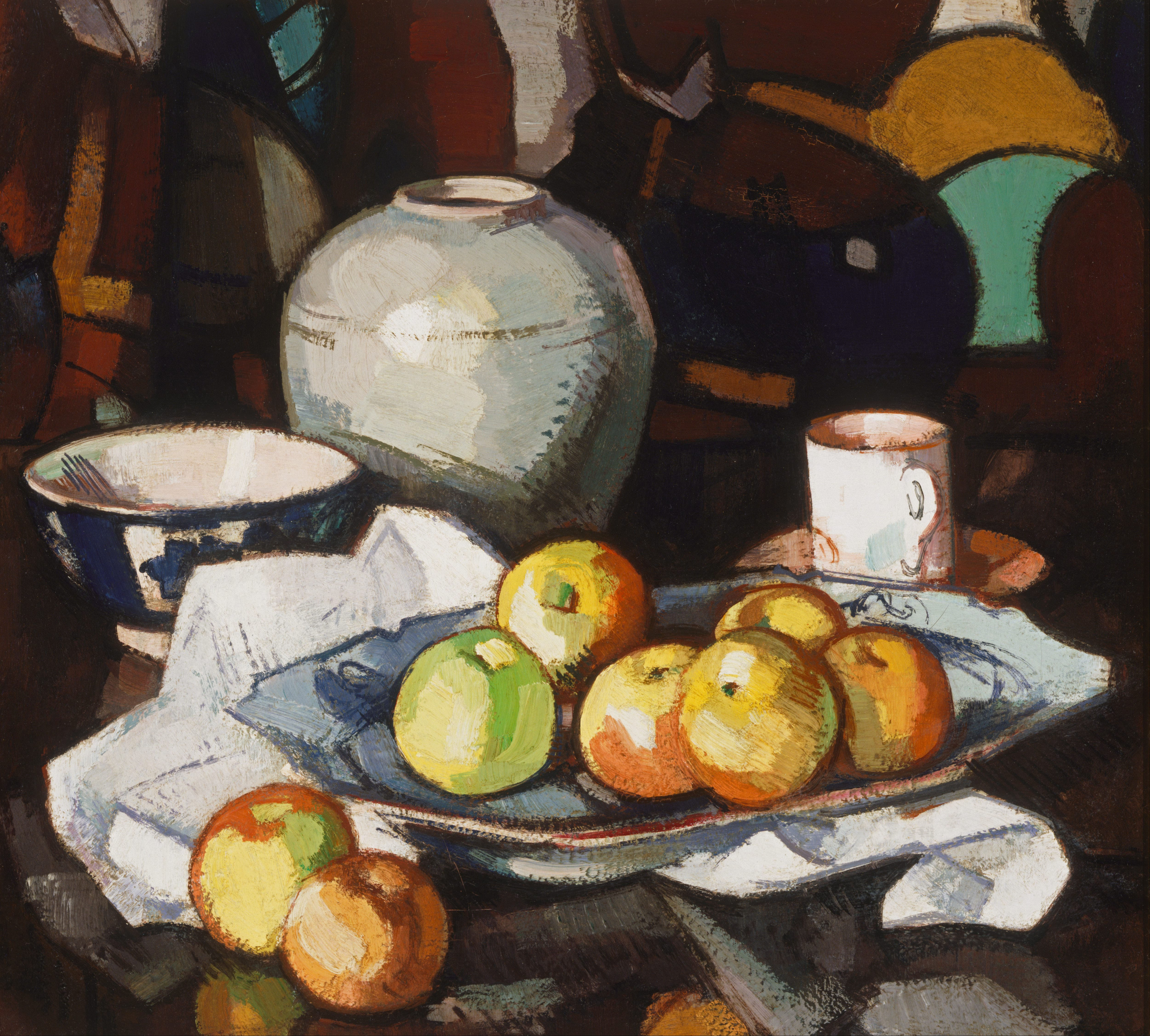
Samuel Peploe Still life – Apples and Jar, c. 1912

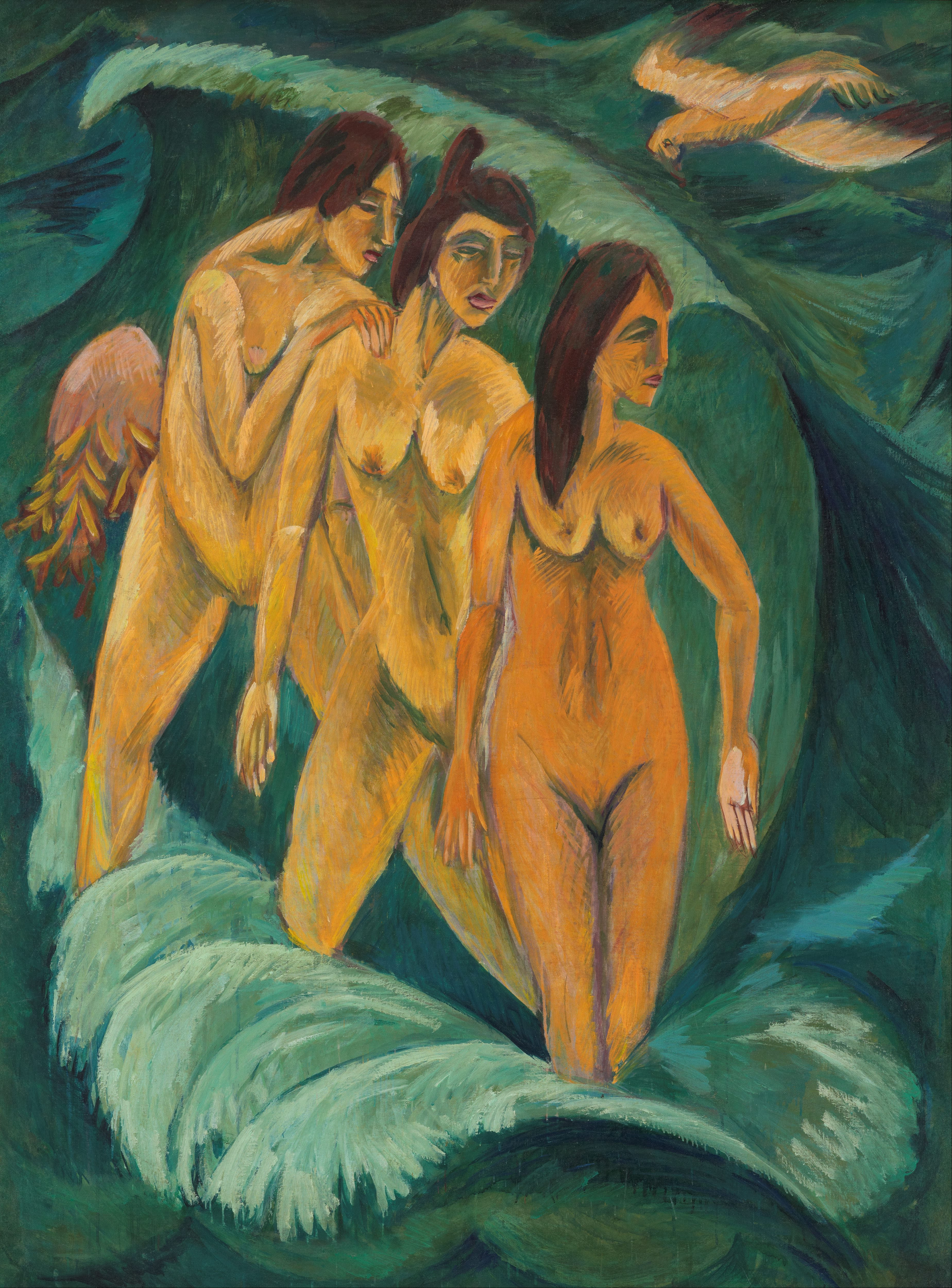
Ernst Ludwig Kirchner, Three Bathers, 1913

== Temporary exhibitions ==
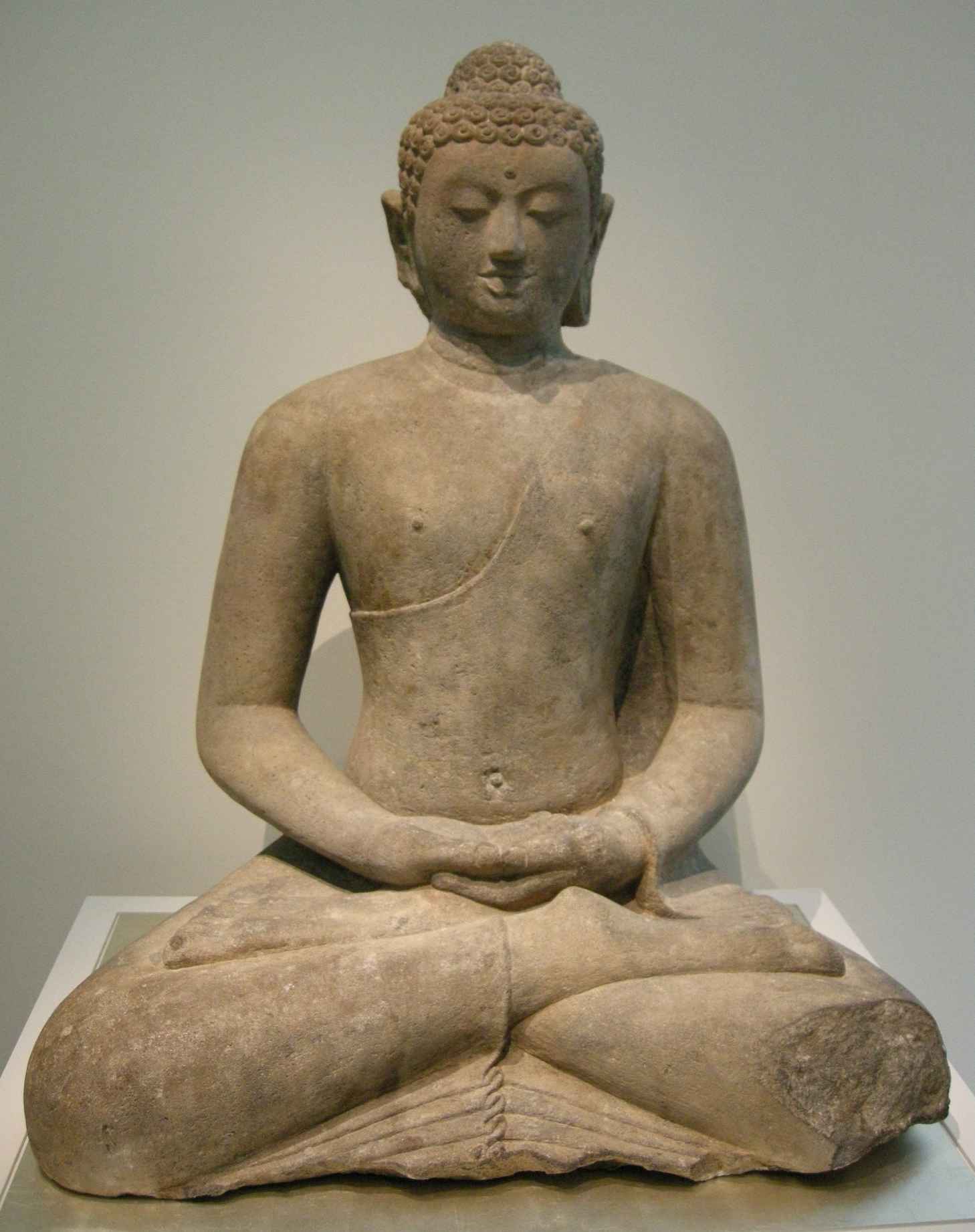
Amida celestial Buddha

Around 40 temporary exhibitions are held each year; some with an entry charge. In addition to one-off exhibitions, the gallery hosts the long running Archibald Prize, the most prominent Australian art prize, along with the Sulman, Wynne and the Dobell art prizes, among others. the gallery also exhibits ARTEXPRESS, a yearly showcase of Higher School Certificate Visual Arts Examination artworks from across New South Wales.

== The National ==
The National is a series of biennial survey exhibitions featuring contemporary artists, run as a partnership between AGNSW, Carriageworks and the Museum of Contemporary Art Australia (MCA) and held across the three galleries. The inaugural edition was held in 2017.

The National 2021: New Australian Art, the third in the series, was held between March and September 2021, featuring new and commissioned projects by 39 artists, collectives and collaborative groups. Featured artists included Vernon Ah Kee with Dalisa Pigram, Betty Muffler, Sally Smart, Alick Tipoti, Judy Watson, Judith Wright, and Tom Polo.

== Brett Whiteley Studio ==
The Brett Whiteley Studio at 2 Raper Street, Surry Hills was the workplace and home of Australian artist Brett Whiteley (1939–1992). Since 1995 it has been managed as a museum by the Art Gallery of NSW.

== Programs ==
Education

Gallery educators produce a diverse range of resources for the primary, secondary and tertiary education audiences linked to the collection and major exhibitions.

Volunteer guides

Gallery guides provide tours of the collection and exhibitions to visitors, including school groups, gallery members, corporate clients and VIPs.

Conservation

Gallery conservators undertake projects to safeguard artworks by preventing, slowing down, remedying or reversing decay and damage while ensuring artworks are safely displayed, stored or transported.

Public programs

The gallery has a program of talks, films, performances, courses and workshops as well as programs designed to increase access for people with special needs.

== Facilities ==
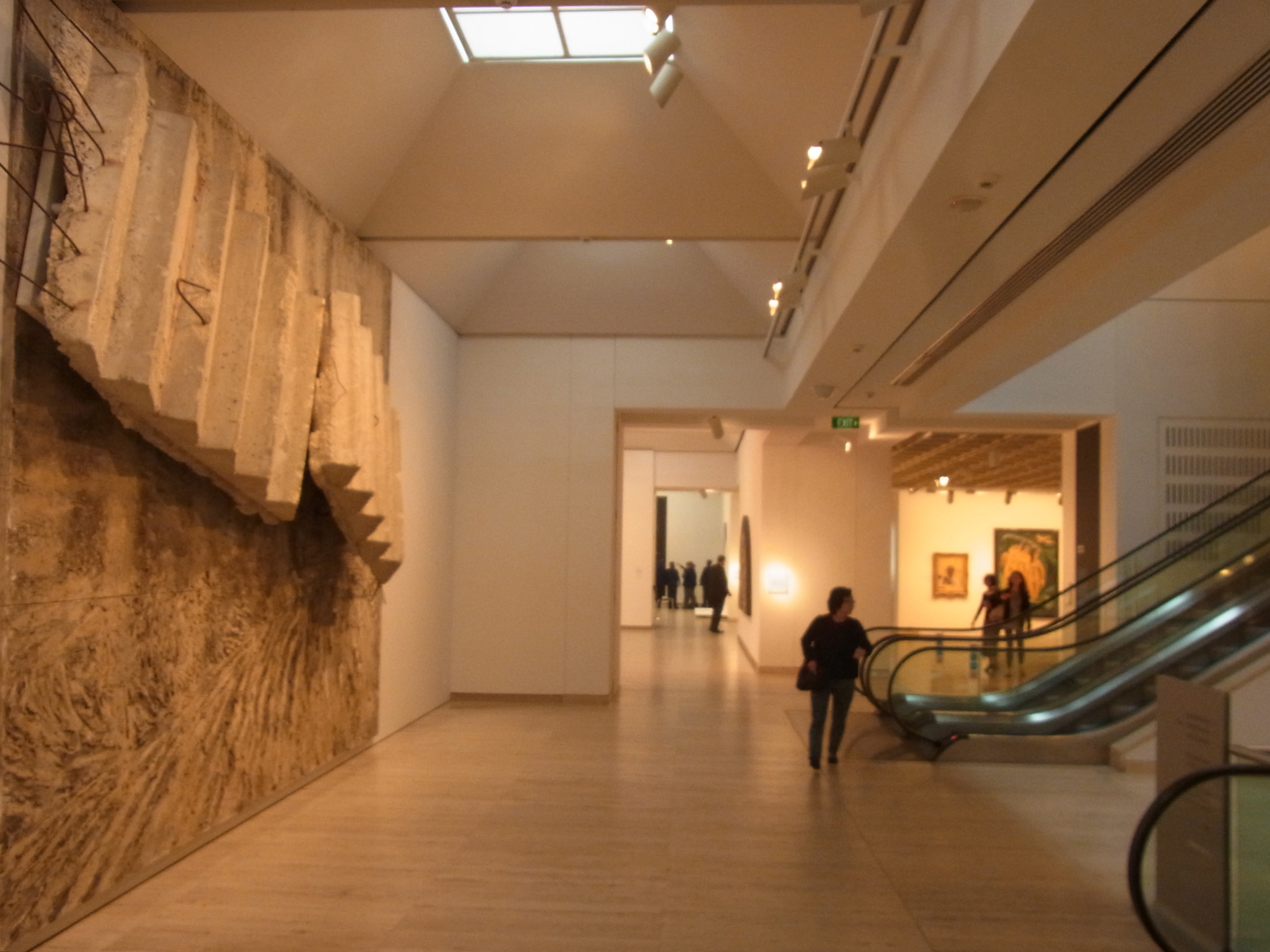
Bicentennial Wing – contemporary art spaces at the escalators (2014)

- Café
- Restaurant
- Library and archive
- Study room
- Gallery Shop
- Centenary Auditorium – 90 seats
- Domain Theatre – 330 seats

== Governance ==
The Art Gallery of NSW is a statutory body established under the Art Gallery of New South Wales Act (1980) and is a body aligned with NSW Trade & Investment. Led by a board of trustees, the gallery also provides administrative support for several other entities, each with its own legal structure: the Art Gallery of NSW Foundation, VisAsia, Brett Whiteley Foundation and Art Gallery Society of NSW.

The board of trustees has nine members plus a president and vice president. An executive is composed of the gallery director, deputy directory, and three senior staff members. The Art Gallery of NSW Foundation is the gallery's major acquisition fund and the umbrella organisation for all the gallery benefactor groups and funds. It raises money from donations and bequests, invests this capital and then uses the income to purchase works of art for the collection. The Art Gallery of New South Wales has also developed a sound foundation of corporate support. It presenting partners and sponsors include Aqualand Projects, EY, Herbert Smith Freehills, JPMorgan Chase, Macquarie Group and UBS.

VisAsia, the Australian Institute of Asian Culture and Visual Arts, was established to promote Asian arts and culture. It includes both the VisAsia Council and individual membership. The Brett Whiteley Foundation, promotes and encourages knowledge and appreciation of the work of the late Brett Whiteley. The Art Gallery Society of NSW is the gallery's membership organisation. Its objectives are to enhance members' enjoyment of art, and to raise funds for the gallery's collection. The society is a separate legal entity, controlled and operated by the Society Council and members.

=== Directors ===
Order	Officeholder	Position title	Start date	End date	Term in office	Ref
1	Eliezer Levi Montefiore	Director	1 September 1892	22 October 1894	2 years, 51 days	
2	George Edward Layton	Secretary and Superintendent	1 January 1895	26 May 1905	10 years, 145 days	
3	Gother Mann CBE	Secretary and Superintendent	1 July 1905	7 May 1913	23 years, 185 days	
3	Gother Mann CBE	Director and Secretary	7 May 1913	2 January 1929	23 years, 185 days	
4	James MacDonald	Director and Secretary	2 January 1929	13 November 1936	7 years, 316 days	
–	William Herbert Ifould (acting)	Director and Secretary	13 November 1936	15 February 1937	94 days	
5	Will Ashton OBE	Director and Secretary	15 February 1937	28 April 1944	7 years, 73 days	
–	Hector Pope Melville (acting)	Director and Secretary	28 April 1944	11 July 1945	1 year, 74 days	
6	Hal Missingham AO	Director and Secretary	11 July 1945	3 September 1971	26 years, 54 days	
7	Peter Laverty	Director	3 September 1971	30 December 1977	6 years, 118 days	
–	Gil Docking (acting)	Director	30 December 1977	17 August 1978	230 days	
8	Edmund Capon AM, OBE	Director	17 August 1978	23 December 2011	33 years, 128 days	
–	Anne Flanagan (acting)	Director	23 December 2011	4 June 2012	164 days	
9	Michael Brand	Director	4 June 2012	27 March 2025	12 years, 296 days	
10	Maud Page	Director	28 March 2025	present	1 year, 239 days	

=== Board of trustees ===
The board of trustees comprises ten trustees and the president, two of which must have knowledge of, and be experienced in, the arts. The current members of the board are:

President	Term begins	Term ends
Michael Rose AM	1 January 2025	31 December 2027
Trustee	Term begins	Term ends
Sally Herman (Vice President)	1 January 2019	31 December 2027
Tony Albert	1 January 2020	31 December 2028
Anita Belgiorno-Nettis AM	1 January 2020	31 December 2028
Andrew Cameron AM	1 January 2020	31 December 2028
Peter Collins AM, RFD, KC	1 January 2025	31 December 2027
Will Cook	15 October 2025	14 October 2028
Verity Firth AM	6 August 2026	5 August 2029
Keira Grant	1 January 2023	31 December 2028
Paris Neilson	1 January 2022	31 December 2027
Caroline Rothwell	1 January 2022	31 December 2027
Emile Sherman	1 January 2025	31 December 2027

==== Presidents of the board ====
#	President	Term	Time in office	Notes
1	Sir Alfred Stephen GCMG, CB	11 June 1874 – 30 January 1889	14 years, 233 days	
2	Eliezer Levi Montefiore	20 March 1889 – 6 September 1892	3 years, 170 days	
3	Frederick Eccleston Du Faur	6 September 1892 – 24 April 1915	22 years, 230 days	
4	Sir James Reading Fairfax	28 May 1915 – 28 March 1919	3 years, 304 days	
5	Sir John Sulman	11 April 1919 – 18 August 1934	15 years, 129 days	
6	Sir Philip Whistler Street KCMG	20 August 1934 – 11 September 1938	4 years, 22 days	
7	John Lane Mullins	23 September 1938 – 24 February 1939	154 days	
8	Bertrand James Waterhouse OBE	10 March 1939 – 23 July 1958	19 years, 135 days	
9	William Herbert Ifould OBE	23 July 1958 – 1 July 1960	1 year, 344 days	
10	Eben Gowrie Waterhouse OBE, CMG	1 July 1960 – 28 December 1962	2 years, 180 days	
11	Sir Erik Langker OBE	28 December 1962 – 7 June 1974	11 years, 161 days	
12	Walter Bunning	7 June 1974 – 16 September 1977	3 years, 101 days	
13	John Nagle QC	16 September 1977 – 11 July 1980	2 years, 299 days	
14	Charles Benyon Lloyd Jones CMG	11 July 1980 – 11 July 1983	3 years, 0 days	
15	Michael Gleeson-White AO	11 July 1983 – 10 July 1988	4 years, 365 days	
16	Frank Lowy AO	10 July 1988 – 31 December 1996	8 years, 174 days	
17	David Gonski AC	1 January 1997 – 31 December 2006	9 years, 364 days	
18	Steven Lowy AM	1 January 2007 – 31 December 2013	6 years, 364 days	
19	Guido Belgiorno-Nettis AM	1 January 2014 – 31 December 2015	1 year, 364 days	
–	David Gonski AC	1 January 2016 – 31 December 2024	8 years, 365 days	
20	Michael Rose AM	1 January 2025 – 31 December 2027	1 year, 325 days	

== Popular culture ==
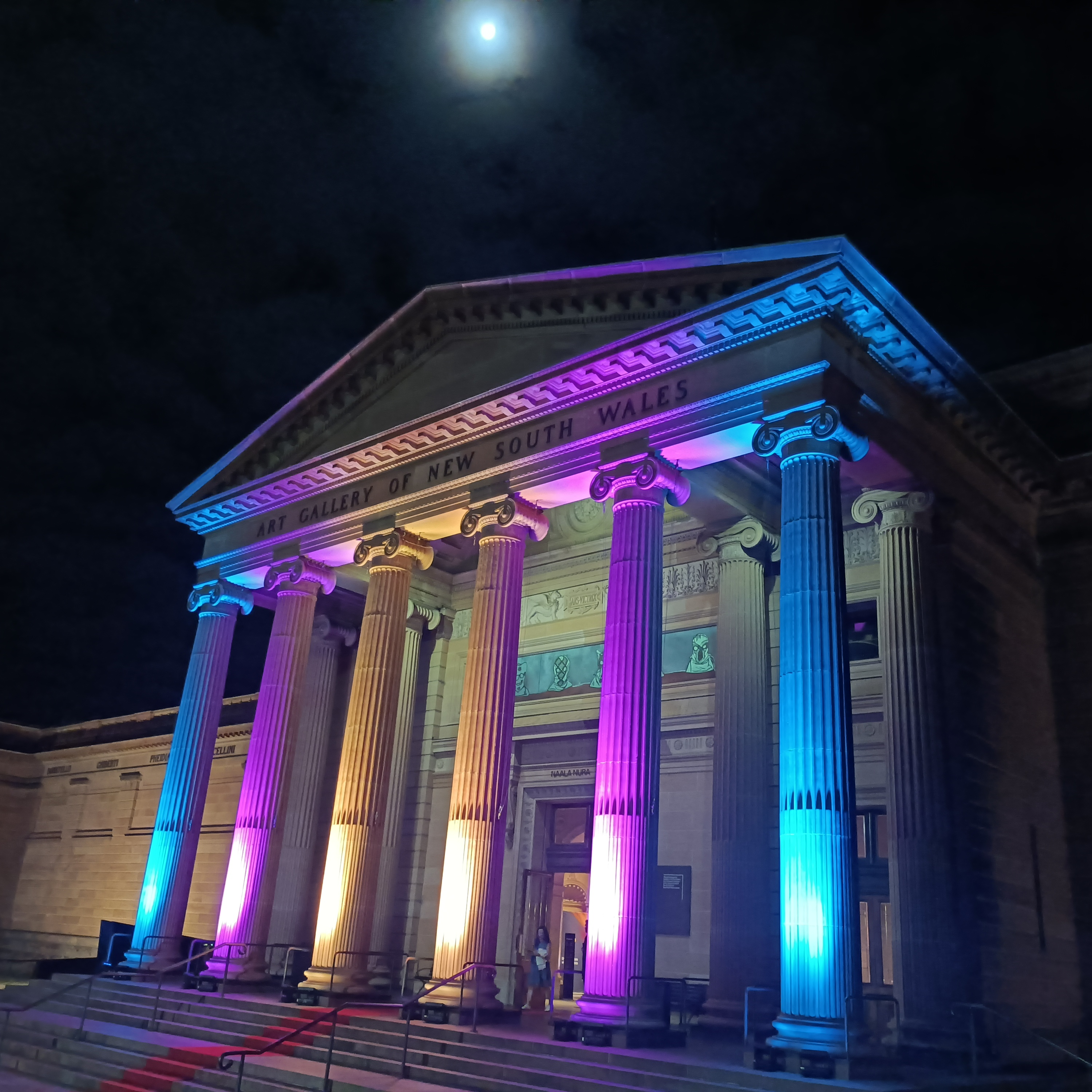
Coloured lights on the facade of the Naala Nura building. 2026

At the start of the film Sirens, Hugh Grant walks past paintings in the Art Gallery of NSW, including Spring Frost by Elioth Gruner, The Golden Fleece (1894) by Tom Roberts, Still Glides the Stream and Shall Forever Glide (1890) by Arthur Streeton, Bailed Up (1895) by Tom Roberts, and Chaucer at the Court of Edward III (1847–51) by Ford Madox Brown.

== See also ==
- Bill Boustead, senior conservator 1954–1977
- List of national galleries
- List of largest art museums
- National Gallery of Australia
- National Gallery of Victoria
- Queensland Art Gallery
- Art Gallery of South Australia
- Art Gallery of Western Australia
- Tasmanian Museum and Art Gallery
