= Montefiore (surname) =

Montefiore (its variations, Montifiore, Montefiori, and Montifiori), is a surname, meaning "flower mountain". The surname is associated with the Montefiore family, Sephardi Jews who were diplomats and bankers all over Europe.

The name derives from one of three towns in Italy, although it is not known which one. By 1630 the Montefiores were merchants living in Ancona, with some of them later moving to Livorno.

Notable people with the surname include:

- Adam Montefiore (born 1957), British-born Israeli wine trade veteran and wine critic
- Alan Montefiore (1926–2024), British philosopher and Fellow of Balliol College, Oxford
- Albert Montefiore Hyamson (1875–1954), British civil servant and historian, chief immigration officer in British Palestine 1921–1934
- Claude Montefiore (1858–1938), philosopher
- Dora Montefiore (1851–1933), English-Australian women's suffragist, socialist, poet, and autobiographer
- Eliezer Levi Montefiore, businessman and art collector in Melbourne and Adelaide (nephew of Jacob and Joseph Barrow)
- Fausto Montefiore (1906–not known), Italian boxer
- Georges Montefiore-Levi (1832–1906), Belgian politician, inventor and philanthropist
- Hugh Sebag-Montefiore (born 1955), author, attorney, and journalist
- Hugh Montefiore (1920–2005), bishop of Birmingham 1977–1987 and environmentalist (born Hugh Sebag-Montefiore)
- Jacob Barrow Montefiore (1801–1895), Colonial Commissioner for South Australia resident in London (brother of Joseph Barrow, cousin to Sir Moses)
- Jacob Levi Montefiore (1819–1885), Australian politician (brother of Eliezer Levi, nephew of Jacob and Joseph Barrow)
- John Israel Montefiore (1807–1898), New Zealand trader and merchant
- Joseph Barrow Montefiore (1803–1893), merchant and financier in the Australian colonies (brother of Jacob Barrow, cousin to Sir Moses)
- Joseph Meyer Montefiore, president of the Board of Deputies of British Jews, 1862–1868, 1868–1871, and 1874–1880
- Joseph Sebag-Montefiore (1822–1903) financier
- Judith Montefiore (1786–1862), British linguist, musician, and philanthropist, wife of Sir Moses
- Sir Moses Montefiore (1784–1885), prominent British financier, stockbroker, banker and philanthropist, husband of Judith
- Moses Eliezer Montefiore (1798–1894), probably brother of Jacob and Joseph Barrow
- Leonard A. Montefiore (1853–1879), British author and philanthropist
- Leonard G. Montefiore (1889–1961), Anglo-Jewish community leader and philanthropist
- Santa Montefiore (born 1970), British author
- Simon Sebag Montefiore (born 1965), British historian and author

== See also ==
- Montefiore (disambiguation)
