= Montefiore =

Montefiore may refer to:

== People ==
- Montefiore (surname), several people with the surname Montefiore, in particular
  - Sir Moses Montefiore (1784–1885), a prominent British financier, stockbroker, banker and philanthropist

== Places ==
- Montefiore, a neighborhood in Tel Aviv
- Montefiore Conca, a municipality in the Province of Rimini, Italy
- Montefiore dell'Aso, a municipality in the Province of Ascoli Piceno, Italy
- Montefiore Hill, a small hill with lookout and memorial in North Adelaide, South Australia, named after Jacob Barrow Montefiore
  - Montefiore Road, continuation of Morphett Street, Adelaide, Australia which leads up to Montefiore Hill
- 782 Montefiore, minor planet orbiting the Sun

=== Schools ===
- Montefiore House, Wessex Lane Halls, University of Southampton
- Montefiore Institute, the Electrical Engineering and Computer Science department of the University of Liège
- Montefiore Residency Program in Social Medicine, one of the oldest primary care training programs in the U.S., active in Bronx
- Moses Montefiore Academy, a special school of the Chicago Public Schools (CPS) for students with severe emotional disorders

=== Synagogues ===
- B'nai Israel Synagogue and Montefiore Cemetery, in Grand Forks, North Dakota
- Congregation Montefiore Synagogue, Salt Lake City, Utah
- Montefiore Synagogue, the former private synagogue of Sir Moses Montefiore in Ramsgate, Kent, England
- Moses Montefiore Congregation, synagogue in Bloomington, Illinois

== Other uses ==
- Montefiore Cemetery, a Jewish cemetery in St. Albans, Queens, New York
- Montefiore Club, a private social and business association catering to the Jewish community, Montreal, Quebec, Canada
- Montefiore Hospital (disambiguation), several hospitals
- Montefiore Windmill, a windmill in Jerusalem, Israel
- Sir Moses Montefiore Home, residential elderly care facilities in Hunters Hill and Woollahra, New South Wales, Australia
