= Antisemitism in the Arab world =

Antisemitism—prejudice against and hatred of Jews—has increased greatly in the Arab world since the beginning of the 20th century, with a variety of proposed explanations: the dissolution and breakdown of the Ottoman Empire and traditional Islamic society; European influence, brought about by Western imperialism and Arab Christians; Nazi propaganda and relations between Nazi Germany and the Arab world; resentment over Zionism and the experience of the Nakba; the rise of Arab nationalism; Quranic passages justifying hostile beliefs and treatment of Jews; and the widespread proliferation of anti-Jewish and anti-Zionist conspiracy theories.

Traditionally, Jews in the Muslim world were considered People of the Book (Arabic: أهل الكتاب, romanized: ahl al-kitāb) and were subjected to dhimmi (ذِمِّيّ, 'protected person'; Hebrew: ד׳ימי) status vis-à-vis the Quranic text itself, the Hadith, the Pact of Umar, and later works of Sharia. They were afforded relative security against persecution, provided they did not contest the varying inferior social and legal status imposed on them under Islamic rule.

While there were antisemitic incidents committed by Muslims before the 20th century, tensions surrounding Zionism and the escalating intercommunal conflict in Mandatory Palestine led to growing antisemitism in the Arab world. During the 1930s and the 1940s several Jewish communities in the Arab world suffered from pogroms, such as the Farhud. The status of Jews in Arab countries deteriorated further at the onset of the Arab–Israeli conflict, which began with the 1948 Arab–Israeli War, the forced expulsion of Palestinian Arabs, and the creation of the State of Israel. Israeli victories during the wars of 1956 and 1967 further increased tensions between Israel and its opponents—primarily Egypt, Syria, and Iraq. However, by the mid-1970s, a mass Jewish exodus from Arab and Muslim countries had occurred, with expelled Jews moving primarily to Israel, France, and the United States. The reason for the exodus is considered to be primarily due to prolonged violence against Jews.

By the 1980s, according to historian Bernard Lewis, the volume of antisemitic literature published in the Arab world, and the authority of its sponsors, seemed to suggest that classical antisemitism had become an essential part of Arab intellectual life, considerably more than in late 19th- and early 20th-century France and to a degree that has been compared to Nazi Germany. The rise of political Islam during the 1980s and afterwards provided a new mutation of Islamic antisemitism, giving Arab hatred of Jews a religious component.

In its 2008 report on contemporary Arab-Muslim antisemitism, the Israeli Intelligence and Terrorism Information Center dated the beginning of this phenomenon to the spread of classical medieval European, Christian antisemitism into the Arab world starting in the late 19th century. In 2014, the Anti-Defamation League published a global survey of worldwide antisemitic attitudes, reporting that in the Middle East, 74% of adults agreed with a majority of the survey's eleven antisemitic propositions, including that "Jews have too much power in international financial markets" and that "Jews are responsible for most of the world’s wars."

== Medieval times ==
Jews, along with Christians, Sabians, and Zoroastrians living under early and medieval Muslim rule were known as "People of the Book" to Muslims and subjected to the status of dhimmi ("protected" minority) in the lands conquered by Muslim Arabs, a status generally applied to non-Muslim minorities that was later also extended to other Non-Muslims like Sikhs, Hindus, Jains, and Buddhists. Jews were generally seen as a religious group (not a separate race), thus being a part of the "Arab family".

Dhimmi were subjected to a number of restrictions, the application and severity of which varied with time and place. Restrictions included residency in segregated quarters, obligation to wear distinctive clothing, (Note: In many Islamic countries, Jewish men typically wore tunics, instead of trousers. In the same countries, many different local regulations emerged to make Christian and Jewish dhimmi look distinctive in their public appearance. In 1198, the Almohad caliph Abu Yusuf Yaqub al-Mansur decreed that Jews must wear a dark blue garb, with very large sleeves and a grotesquely oversized hat; his son altered the colour to yellow, a change that may have influenced Catholic ordinances some time later. German ethnographer Erich Brauer (1895–1942) noted that Jews in Yemen were not allowed to wear clothing of any color besides blue.) public subservience to Muslims, prohibitions against proselytizing and against marrying Muslim women, and limited access to the legal system (the testimony of a Jew did not count if contradicted by that of a Muslim). Dhimmi had to pay a special poll tax (the jizya), which exempted them from military service, and also from payment of the zakat alms tax required of Muslims. In return, dhimmi were granted limited rights, including a degree of tolerance, community autonomy in personal matters, and protection from being killed outright. Jewish communities, like Christian ones, were typically constituted as semi-autonomous entities managed by their own laws and leadership, who carried the responsibility for the community towards the Muslim rulers.

The situation of Jews was comparatively better than their European counterparts, though they still suffered persecution. Between the years of death of Idris I of Morocco in 793 and beginning of Almohad rule in 1130, Jews mostly led a peaceful existence in North Africa. The Almohads started forcing Jews and Christians to convert to Islam or be killed after conquering the region. There were also numerous massacres at other times in Morocco, Libya, and Algeria.

The situation where Jews both enjoyed cultural and economic prosperity at times, but were widely persecuted at other times, was summarised by G. E. Von Grunebaum:

It would not be difficult to put together the names of a very sizable number of Jewish subjects or citizens of the Islamic area who have attained to high rank, to power, to great financial influence, to significant and recognized intellectual attainment; and the same could be done for Christians. But it would again not be difficult to compile a lengthy list of persecutions, arbitrary confiscations, attempted forced conversions, or pogroms.

== Views in modernity ==
Some scholars hold that Arab antisemitism in the modern world arose in the nineteenth century, against the backdrop of conflicting Jewish and Arab nationalism, and was imported into the Arab world primarily by nationalistically minded Christian Arabs (and only subsequently was it "Islamized"), Mark Cohen states. According to Bernard Lewis:

The volume of anti-Semitic books and articles published, the size and number of editions and impressions, the eminence and authority of those who write, publish and sponsor them, their place in school and college curricula, their role in the mass media, would all seem to suggest that classical anti-Semitism is an essential part of Arab intellectual life at the present time-almost as much as happened in Nazi Germany, and considerably more than in late nineteenth and early twentieth century France."

=== 19th century ===
The Damascus affair was an accusation of ritual murder and a blood libel against Jews in Damascus in 1840. On February 5, 1840, Franciscan Capuchin friar Father Thomas and his Greek servant were reported missing, never to be seen again. The Turkish governor and the French consul Ratti-Menton believed accusations of ritual murder and blood libel, as the alleged murder occurred before the Jewish Passover. An investigation was staged, and Solomon Negrin, a Jewish barber, confessed under torture and accused other Jews. Two other Jews died under torture, and one (Moses Abulafia) converted to Islam to escape torture. More arrests and atrocities followed, culminating in 63 Jewish children being held hostage and mob attacks on Jewish communities throughout the Middle East. International outrage led to Ibrahim Pasha in Egypt ordering an investigation. Negotiations in Alexandria eventually secured the unconditional release and recognition of innocence of the nine prisoners still remaining alive (out of thirteen). Later in Constantinople, Moses Montefiore (leader of the British Jewish community) persuaded Sultan Abdülmecid I to issue a firman (edict) intended to halt the spread of blood libel accusations in the Ottoman Empire:

... and for the love we bear to our subjects, we cannot permit the Jewish nation, whose innocence for the crime alleged against them is evident, to be worried and tormented as a consequence of accusations which have not the least foundation in truth....

Nevertheless, the blood libel spread through the Middle East and North Africa: Aleppo (1810, 1850, 1875), Damascus (1840, 1848, 1890), Safi, Morocco in 1863, Beirut (1862, 1874), Dayr al-Qamar (1847), Jerusalem (1847), Cairo (1844, 1890, 1901–02), Mansura (1877), Alexandria (1870, 1882, 1901–02), Port Said (1903, 1908), and Damanhur (1871, 1873, 1877, 1892).

The Dreyfus affair of the late 19th century had consequences in the Arab world. Passionate outbursts of antisemitism in France were echoed in areas of French influence, especially Maronite Lebanon. The Muslim Arab press, however, was sympathetic to the falsely accused Captain Dreyfus, and criticized the persecution of Jews in France.

=== 20th century ===
==== Pre-state antisemitism ====
While Arab antisemitism has increased in the wake of the Arab–Israeli conflict, there were pogroms against Jews prior to the establishment of the State of Israel in May 1948, including Nazi-inspired pogroms in Algeria in the 1930s, and attacks on the Jews of Iraq and Libya in the 1940s. In 1941, 180 Jews were murdered and 700 were injured in the anti-Jewish riots known as "the Farhud". Four hundred Jews were injured in violent demonstrations in Egypt in 1945 and Jewish property was vandalized and looted. In Libya, 130 Jews were killed and 266 injured. In December 1947, 13 Jews were killed in Damascus, including 8 children, and 26 were injured. In Aleppo, rioting resulted in dozens of Jewish casualties, damage to 150 Jewish homes, and the torching of 5 schools and 10 synagogues. In Yemen, 97 Jews were murdered and 120 injured.

During the British Mandate period, a successful anti-malaria campaign launched in 1922 transformed much of Palestine's previously uninhabitable, swamp-ridden land into habitable and cultivable territory, an achievement recognized by the League of Nations Malaria Commission for fostering cooperation between Jewish and Arab communities. The resulting public health improvements led to a sharp natural increase in the Arab population—the highest rate recorded globally at the time—contributing to local overcrowding and social strain. British commissions of the 1930s attributed this pressure primarily to demographic growth rather than to Jewish land purchases, noting that most land acquired by Jews had been malarious or otherwise uncultivable before reclamation. Nevertheless, certain Arab political leaders, including Grand Mufti Hajj Amin al-Husseini, advanced narratives blaming Jewish settlement for Arab land shortages, which inflamed anti-Jewish sentiment and diverted attention from underlying demographic and economic causes. This politicization of public health achievements reflected early intersections between antisemitic rhetoric and nationalist mobilization in the Arab world.

==== Speculated causes ====
Psychoanalyst Janine Puget identified several enduring sources of antisemitism—religious, ideological, and political—including strains within parts of the Catholic right, the far left (where hostility toward Jews is often expressed as anti-Zionism), and remnants of fascist thought. Antisemitism in the Arab world increased in the 20th century, as resentment against Jewish immigration and Zionist activities in Palestine Mandate grew. Around this time, the fabricated antisemitic text The Protocols of the Elders of Zion started to become available in Palestine. A translation of the text in Arabic was done by an Arab Christian in Cairo in 1927 or 1928, this time as a published book. This propaganda helped transform antisemitic sentiment into a unifying ideological force across parts of the Arab world, framing Jews and Israel as existential threats to Arab and Islamic unity. In March 1921, Musa Khazem El Husseini, Mayor of Jerusalem, told Winston Churchill "The Jews have been amongst the most active advocates of destruction in many lands. ... It is well known that the disintegration of Russia was wholly or in great part brought about by the Jews, and a large proportion of the defeat of Germany and Austria must also be put at their door."

Matthias Küntzel has suggested that the decisive transfer of Jewish conspiracy theory took place between 1937 and 1945 under the impact of Nazi propaganda targeted at the Arab world. According to Kuntzel, the Nazi Arabic radio service had a staff of 80 and broadcast every day in Arabic, stressing the similarities between Islam and Nazism and supported by the activities of the Grand Mufti of Jerusalem, Amin al-Husseini (who broadcast pro-Nazi propaganda from Berlin). Alongside al-Husseini's collaboration with the Nazis, cooperative political and military relationships between the Arab world and the Axis powers (Nazi Germany and Fascist Italy) were founded on shared antisemitic scorn and hostilities toward common enemies: the United Kingdom, France, and Zionism. The Nazi regime also provided funding to the Egyptian Moslem Brotherhood, which began calling for boycotts of Jewish businesses in 1936.

Bernard Lewis also describes Nazi influence in the Arab world, including its impact on Michel Aflaq, the principal founder of Ba'athist thought (which later dominated Syria and Iraq).

After the promulgation of the Nuremberg Laws, Hitler received telegrams of congratulation from all over the Arab and Muslim world, especially from Morocco and Palestine, where the Nazi propaganda had been most active.... Before long political parties of the Nazi and Fascist type began to appear, complete with paramilitary youth organizations, colored shirts, strict discipline and more or less charismatic leaders.

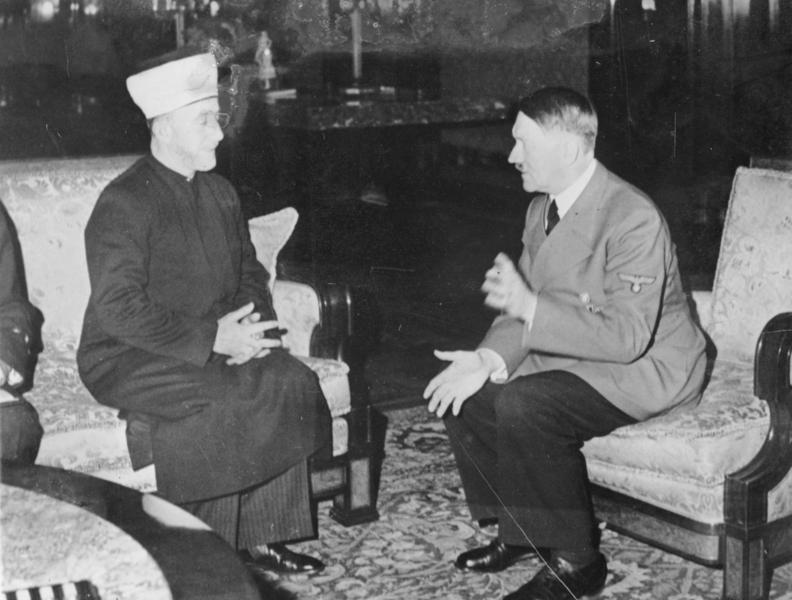
Amin al-Husseini, Grand Mufti of Jerusalem and the chairman of the Supreme Islamic Council meeting with Adolf Hitler (December 1941)

George Gruen attributes the increased animosity towards Jews in the Arab world to the defeat and breakdown of the Ottoman Empire and traditional Islamic society; domination by Western colonial powers under which Jews gained a disproportionately large role in the commercial, professional, and administrative life of the region; the rise of Arab nationalism, whose proponents sought the wealth and positions of local Jews through government channels; resentment over Jewish nationalism and the Zionist movement; and the readiness of unpopular Arab regimes to scapegoat local Jews for political purposes.

After the 1948 Arab–Israeli War, the Palestinian exodus, the creation of the state of Israel, and the independence of Arab countries from European control, conditions for Jews in the Arab world deteriorated. Over the next few decades, almost all would flee the Arab world, some willingly, and some under threat (see Jewish exodus from Arab and Muslim countries). In 1945 there were between 758,000 and 866,000 Jews (see table below) living in communities throughout the Arab world. Today, there are fewer than 8,000. In some Arab states, such as Libya (which was once around 3% Jewish), the Jewish community no longer exists; in other Arab countries, only a few hundred Jews remain.

Harvard University Professor Ruth R. Wisse claims that "anti-Semitism / Zionism has been the cornerstone of pan-Arab politics since the Second World War" and that it is the "strongest actual and potential source of unity" in the Arab world. This is because Jews and Israel function as substitutes for Western values that challenge the hegemony of religious and political power in the Middle East. Antisemitism is also malleable enough that it can unite right-wing and left-wing groups within the Arab world.

Robert Bernstein, founder of Human Rights Watch, says that antisemitism is "deeply ingrained and institutionalized" in "Arab nations in modern times".

== Contemporary attitudes ==
=== Israeli Arabs ===
In 2003, Israeli-Arab Raed Salah, the leader of the northern branch of the Islamic Movement in Israel published the following poem in the Islamic Movement's periodical:

You Jews are criminal bombers of mosques,
Slaughterers of pregnant women and babies.
Robbers and germs in all times,
The Creator sentenced you to be loser monkeys,
Victory belongs to Muslims, from the Nile to the Euphrates.

During a speech in 2007, Salah accused Jews of using children's blood to bake bread. "We have never allowed ourselves to knead [the dough for] the bread that breaks the fast in the holy month of Ramadan with children's blood," he said. "Whoever wants a more thorough explanation, let him ask what used to happen to some children in Europe, whose blood was mixed in with the dough of the [Jewish] holy bread."

Kamal Khatib, deputy leader of the northern branch of the Islamic movement, referred in one of his speeches to the Jews as "fleas".

Of all groups surveyed, a 2010 Pew Research global poll found that Israeli Arabs have the lowest rate of anti-Jewish attitudes in the Middle East.

=== Egypt ===
In an article published in October 2000, columnist Adel Hammoda alleged in the state-owned Egyptian newspaper al-Ahram that Jews made Matza from the blood of (non-Jewish) children. Mohammed Salmawy, editor of Al-Ahram Hebdo, "defended the use of old European myths like the blood libel" in his newspapers. On 29 April 2002, government-run Egyptian newspaper Al-Akhbar published an editorial denying the Holocaust. The next paragraph decried the failure of the Holocaust to eliminate all Jews:

With regard to the fraud of the Holocaust... Many French studies have proven that this is no more than a fabrication, a lie, and a fraud!! That is, it is a 'scenario' the plot of which was carefully tailored, using several faked photos completely unconnected to the truth. Yes, it is a film, no more and no less. Hitler himself, whom they accuse of Nazism, is in my eyes no more than a modest 'pupil' in the world of murder and bloodshed. He is completely innocent of the charge of frying them in the hell of his false Holocaust!!

The entire matter, as many French and British scientists and researchers have proven, is nothing more than a huge Israeli plot aimed at extorting the German government in particular and the European countries in general. But I, personally and in light of this imaginary tale, complain to Hitler, even saying to him from the bottom of my heart, 'If only you had done it, brother, if only it had really happened, so that the world could sigh in relief [without] their evil and sin.'

In 2005, Egyptian Muslim Brotherhood leader Mohammed Mahdi Akef denounced what he called "the myth of the Holocaust" in defending then-Iranian president Mahmoud Ahmadinejad's denial of it. In August 2010, Saudi columnist Iman Al-Quwaifli sharply criticized the "phenomenon of sympathy for Adolf Hitler and for Nazism in the Arab world", specifically citing the words of Hussam Fawzi Jabar, an Islamic cleric who justified Hitler's actions against the Jews in an Egyptian talk show one month earlier.

In an October 2012 sermon broadcast on Egyptian Channel 1 (which was attended by Egyptian President Muhammad Morsi) Futouh Abd Al-Nabi Mansour, the Head of Religious Endowment of the Matrouh Governorate, prayed (as translated by MEMRI):

O Allah, absolve us of our sins, strengthen us, and grant us victory over the infidels. O Allah, destroy the Jews and their supporters. O Allah, disperse them, rend them asunder. O Allah, demonstrate Your might and greatness upon them.

In 2001–2002, Arab Radio and Television produced a 30-part television miniseries entitled Horseman Without a Horse, starring prominent Egyptian actor Mohamed Sobhi, which contains dramatizations of The Protocols of the Elders of Zion. The United States and Israel criticized Egypt for airing the program, which includes racist falsehoods that have a history of being used "as a pretext for persecuting Jews".

=== Jordan ===
Jordan does not allow entry to Jews with visible signs of Judaism or even with personal religious items in their possession. The Jordanian ambassador to Israel replied to a complaint by a religious Jew denied entry that security concerns required that travelers entering the Hashemite Kingdom not do so with prayer shawls (Tallit) and phylacteries (Tefillin). Jordanian authorities state that the policy is in order to ensure the Jewish tourists' safety.

In July 2009, six Breslov Hasidim were deported after attempting entry into Jordan in order to visit the tomb of Aaron / Sheikh Harun on Mount Hor, near Petra, because of an alert from the Ministry of Tourism. The group had taken a ferry from Sinai, Egypt because they understood that Jordanian authorities were making it hard for visible Jews to enter from Israel. The Israeli Ministry of Foreign Affairs is aware of the issue.

=== Saudi Arabia ===
Hostility toward Jews is common in Saudi Arabian media, religious sermons, school curriculum, and official government policy.

Indoctrination against Jews is a part of school curriculum in Saudi Arabia. Children are advised not to befriend Jews, are given false information about them (such as the claim that Jews worship the Devil), and are encouraged to engage in jihad against Jews.

Conspiracy theories about Jews are widely disseminated in Saudi Arabian state-controlled media.

According to the U.S. State Department, religious freedom "does not exist" in Saudi Arabia, and therefore, Jews may not freely practice their religion.

=== Syria ===
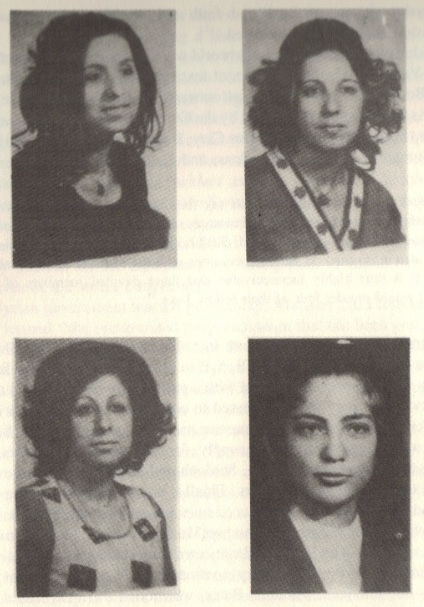
Clockwise from top left: Fara Zeibak, Mazal Zeibak, Eva Saad and Lulu Zeibak

On March 2, 1974, the bodies of four Syrian Jewish women were discovered by border police in a cave in the Zabdani Mountains northwest of Damascus. Fara Zeibak (24), her sisters Lulu Zeibak (23), Mazal Zeibak (22) and their cousin Eva Saad (18), had contracted with a band of smugglers to flee Syria to Lebanon and eventually to Israel. The girls' bodies were found raped, murdered and mutilated. The police also found the remains of two Jewish boys, Natan Shaya (18) and Kassem Abadi (20), victims of an earlier massacre. Syrian authorities deposited the bodies of all six in sacks before the homes of their parents in the Jewish ghetto in Damascus.

In 1984 Syrian Defense Minister Mustafa Tlass published a book called The Matzah of Zion, which claimed that Jews had killed Christian children in Damascus to make Matzas (see Damascus affair). His book inspired the Egyptian TV series Horseman Without a Horse (see § Egypt) and a spinoff, The Diaspora, which led to Hezbollah's al-Manar being banned in Europe for broadcasting it.

Former Ku Klux Klan leader David Duke visited Syria in November 2005 and made a speech that was broadcast live on Syrian television.

=== Tunisia ===
The history of the Jews in Tunisia goes back to Roman times. Before 1948, the Jewish population of Tunisia reached a peak of 110,000. Today it has a Jewish community of less than 2,000 people. Antisemitism in Vichy-era Tunisia was deeply intertwined with colonial politics and Mediterranean rivalries. Following France's 1940 defeat, the Vichy government implemented antisemitic laws in Tunisia, targeting the region's diverse Jewish community of Tunisian, French, and Italian nationals. These laws, aimed at economic aryanization and exclusion of Jews from public life, were also tools for consolidating French colonial authority. However, enforcement was inconsistent, as colonial officials sought to avoid destabilising the economy or provoking intervention from Fascist Italy, which used its Jewish population to maintain influence. Rather than reflecting ethical restraint, this caution highlighted the tension between antisemitic ideology and pragmatic efforts to safeguard French control amid geopolitical competition and wartime pressures.

For a personal account of the discrimination and physical attacks experienced by Jews in Tunisia the Jewish-Arab anti-colonialist writer Albert Memmi wrote:

At each crisis, with every incident of the slightest importance, the mob would go wild, setting fire to Jewish shops. This even happened during the Yom Kippur War. Tunisia's President, Habib Bourguiba, has in all probability never been hostile to the Jews, but there was always that notorious "delay", which meant that the police arrived on the scene only after the shops had been pillaged and burnt. Is it any wonder that the exodus to France and Israel continued and even increased?

On November 30, 2012, prominent Tunisian imam Sheikh Ahmad Al-Suhayli of Radès, told his followers during a live broadcast on Hannibal TV that "God wants to destroy this [Tunisian] sprinkling of Jews and is sterilizing the wombs of Jewish women." This was the fourth time incitement against Jews has been reported in the public sphere since the overthrow of Tunisian President Zine El Abidine Ben Ali in 2011, thus prompting Jewish community leaders to demand security protection from the Tunisian government. Al-Suhayli subsequently posted a video on the Internet in which he claimed that his statements had been misinterpreted.

On January 18, 2021, Tunisian president Kais Saied was caught on video telling a crowd that "We know very well who the people are who are controlling the country today. It is the Jews who are doing the stealing, and we need to put an end to it." Saied's office responded that the president's words had been misheard and that he meant to say something else instead of Jews. Two days later, Saied publicly apologized for his statements, holding a phone call with Djerba's chief rabbi, Haim Bitan in which he expressed regret for his statements.

The El Ghriba Synagogue in Djerba has twice been the target of terrorist atrocities: in 2002 an al-Qaeda suicide bomber killed 20 and injured dozens more, while in 2023 a lone gunman killed two worshippers and two police and injured several others.

=== Palestinian territories ===
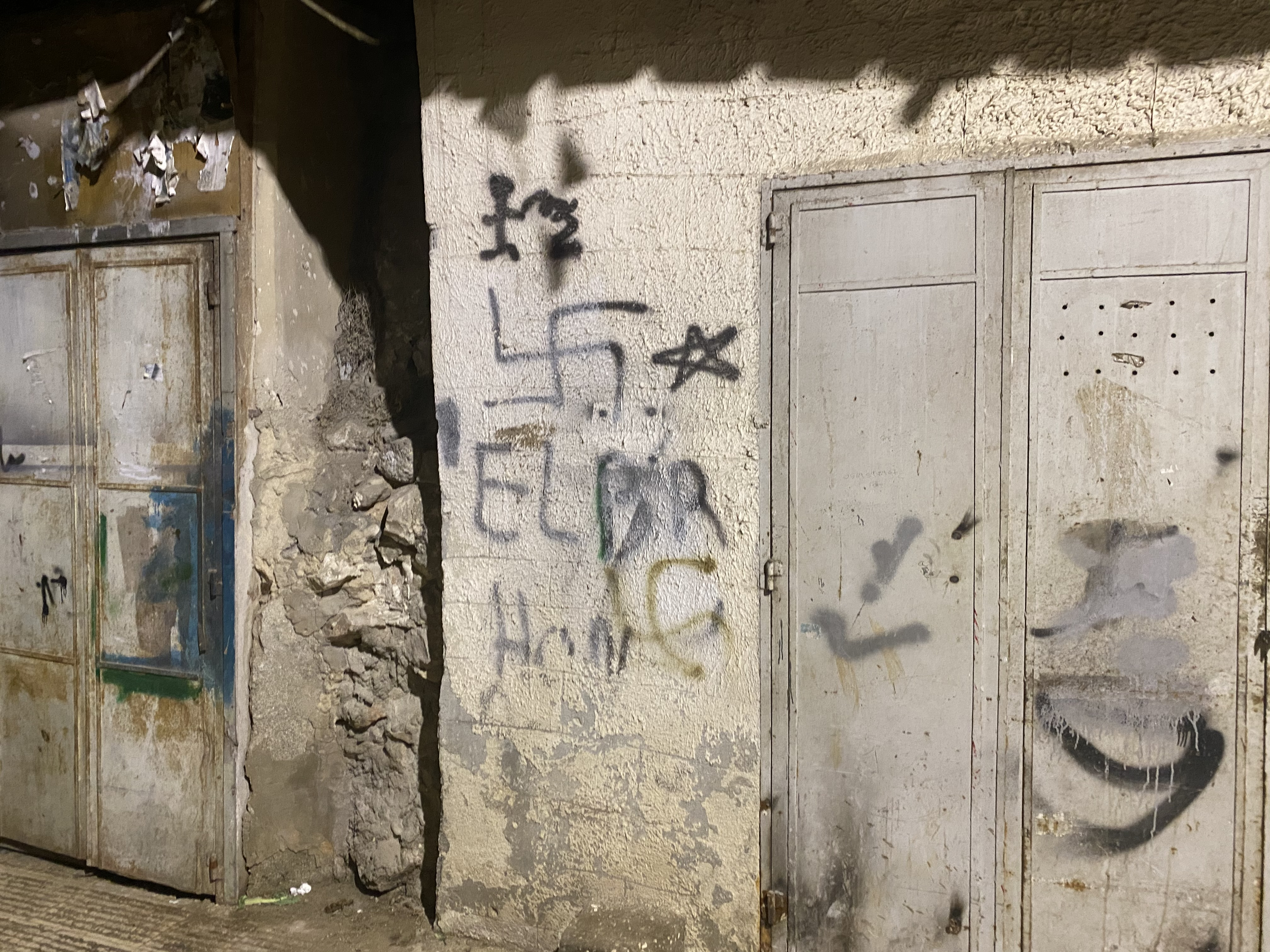
Graffiti of a swastika on a building in the Palestinian city of Nablus, 2022

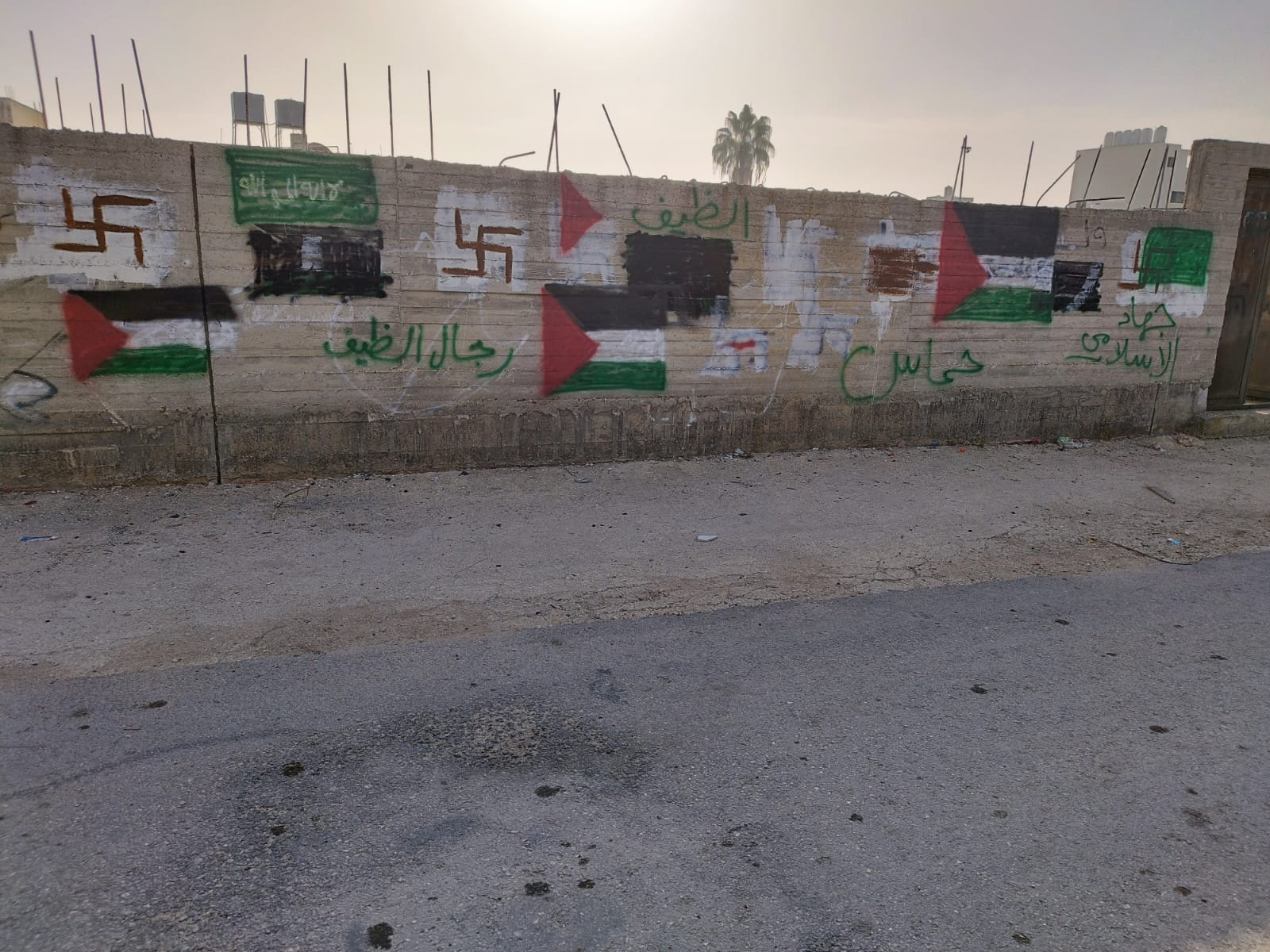
Swastikas next to Palestinian flags in Huwara

Hamas, an offshoot of the Egyptian Muslim Brotherhood, has a foundational statement of principles, or "covenant" that claims that the French revolution, the Russian revolution, colonialism and both world wars were created by the Zionists. It also claims the Freemasons and Rotary clubs are Zionist fronts and refers to the Protocols of the Elders of Zion. Claims that Jews and Freemasons were behind the French Revolution originated in Germany in the mid-19th century.

Mahmoud Abbas, leader of the PLO, published a Ph.D. thesis (at Moscow University) in 1982, called The Secret Connection between the Nazis and the Leaders of the Zionist Movement. His doctoral thesis later became a book, The Other Side: the Secret Relationship Between Nazism and Zionism, which, following his appointment as Palestinian Prime Minister in 2003, was heavily criticized as an example of Holocaust denial. In his book, Abbas wrote:

It seems that the interest of the Zionist movement, however, is to inflate this figure [of Holocaust deaths] so that their gains will be greater. This led them to emphasize this figure [six million] in order to gain the solidarity of international public opinion with Zionism. Many scholars have debated the figure of six million and reached stunning conclusions—fixing the number of Jewish victims at only a few hundred thousand.

=== Lebanon ===
Hezbollah's Al-Manar TV channel has often been accused of airing antisemitic broadcasts, blaming the Jews for a Zionist conspiracy against the Arab world, and often airing excerpts from the Protocols of the Elders of Zion,

Al-Manar recently aired a drama series, called The Diaspora, which is based on historical antisemitic allegations. BBC reporters who watched the series said that:

Correspondents who have viewed The Diaspora note that it quotes extensively from the Protocols of the Elders of Zion, a notorious 19th-century publication used by the Nazis among others to fuel race hatred.

In another incident, an Al-Manar commentator recently referred to "Zionist attempts to transmit AIDS to Arab countries". Al-Manar officials deny broadcasting antisemitic incitement and state that their position is anti-Israeli, not antisemitic. However, Hezbollah has directed strong rhetoric both against Israel and Jews, and it has cooperated in publishing and distributing outright antisemitic literature. The government of Lebanon has not criticized continued broadcast of antisemitic material on television.

Due to protests by the CRIF umbrella group of French Jews regarding allegations of antisemitic content, French Prime Minister Jean-Pierre Raffarin called for a ban on Al-Manar broadcasting in France on December 2, 2004, just two weeks after al-Manar was authorised to continue broadcasting in Europe by France's media watchdog agency. On December 13, 2004, France's highest administrative court banned Hizbullah's Al-Manar TV station on the grounds that it consistently incites racial hatred and antisemitism.

=== Qatar ===
In 2019, Al Raya, a semi-official daily newspaper, published an article stating that "The Zionist movement managed to establish the 'Holocaust culture' in Western political ethics and morally forced it on European societies." The article described the Holocaust as "alleged" and placed the survivors in quotation marks. In that year, the newspaper also published a cartoon by a Palestinian artist that depicts Israel as a stereotypical caricature of an Orthodox Jew.

In 2019, the US Chargé d'Affaires in Qatar and embassy staff met with Qatari officials from the Ministry of Foreign Affairs and with media organizations, including Al Jazeera, to address antisemitic content in publications and broadcasts. They urged the removal of offensive material and sought to prevent antisemitic depictions at events such as the Doha International Book Fair.

In 2026, state-approved textbooks in Qatar were reported to include content that omitted explicit reference to the Holocaust while discussing Nazi Germany and World War II. One textbook encouraged students to read Mein Kampf. An Islamic textbook, used for students around age 13, reportedly described Jews as "evil" for rejecting Islam during its rise in the 7th century, stating: "The Children of Israel described the Holy Quran as blatant magic. There is no one more evil, or misguided, than one who turns away from Islam." Another Islamic education textbook for older pupils reportedly taught that the region of Palestine is an "Arab and Islamic land" that should not be ceded in any part, encouraged efforts toward its "liberation," and called on students to oppose peace with Israel. Following these reports, the British NGO Campaign Against Antisemitism described the material as "outrageous" and called for the schools to withdraw from Qatar.

In 2026, a teacher in Qatar who spoke anonymously to The Sunday Telegraph said she had to remove the word "Jew" from children's Western fiction textbooks and that some Arabic students would "glorify" Hitler in their work. The teacher added: "We are not allowed to mention Jews. The genocide didn't happen to them. It is like brainwashing. Israel does not exist over there. To suggest it does would get you in a lot of trouble. Parents or teachers would call the police."

=== Yemen ===
The 1940s and the establishment of Israel saw rapid emigration of Jews out of Yemen, in the wake of anti-Jewish riots and massacres. By the late 1990s, only several hundred remained, mainly in a northwestern mountainous region named Sa'ada and town of Raida. Houthi members put up notes on the Jews' doors, accusing them of corrupting Muslim morals. Eventually, the Houthi leaders sent threatening messages to the Jewish community: "We warn you to leave the area immediately.... We give you a period of 10 days, or you will regret it."

On 28 March 2021, 13 Jews were forced by the Houthis to leave Yemen, leaving four elderly Jews the only Jews still in Yemen.

=== Opinion polling ===
In 2008, a Pew Research Center survey found that negative views concerning Jews were most common in the three predominantly Arab nations polled, with 97% of Lebanese having unfavorable opinion of Jews, 95% in Egypt, and 96% in Jordan.

== See also ==
- Contemporary imprints of The Protocols of the Elders of Zion
- Covenant of Umar I
- Dhimmi
- Islam and antisemitism
- Jewish exodus from Arab and Muslim lands
- Jizya
- Mellah
- Pact of Umar II
- Qutbism
- Racism in the Arab world

== Bibliography ==
- Bostom, Andrew G. The Legacy of Islamic Antisemitism: From Sacred texts to Solemn History. Prometheus Books. 2008. ISBN 978-1-59102-554-2
- Gerber, Jane S. (1986). "Anti-Semitism and the Muslim World". In History and Hate: The Dimensions of Anti-Semitism, ed. David Berger. Jewish Publications Society. ISBN 0-8276-0267-7
- Herf, Jeffrey (2009). The Jewish Enemy: Nazi Propaganda for the Arab World. Ann Arbor, Michigan: Yale University Press. ISBN 978-0-300-14579-3.
- Levy, Richard S., ed. Antisemitism: A historical encyclopedia of prejudice and persecution (Vol. 1. ABC-CLIO, 2005) pp 30–33.
- Lewis, Bernard (1984). The Jews of Islam. Princeton: Princeton University Press. ISBN 0-691-00807-8
- Lewis, Bernard (1999). Semites and anti-Semites. ISBN 0-393-31839-7
- Laqueur, Walter. The Changing Face of Antisemitism: From Ancient Times To The Present Day. Oxford University Press. 2006. ISBN 0-19-530429-2
- Poliakov, Leon (1997). "Anti-Semitism". Encyclopaedia Judaica (CD-ROM Edition Version 1.0). Ed. Cecil Roth. Keter Publishing House. ISBN 965-07-0665-8
- Satloff, Robert (2006). Among the Righteous: Lost Stories from the Holocaust's Long Reach into Arab Lands. New York: Perseus Book Group. ISBN 978-1-58648-399-9.
- Segev, Tom. One Palestine, Complete: Jews and Arabs Under the British Mandate. Trans. Haim Watzman. New York: Henry Holt and Company, 2001.
- Wistrich, Robert S. Hitler's Apocalypse: Jews and the Nazi Legacy. Weidenfeld & Nicolson. 1985. ISBN 0-297-78719-5
- Wistrich, Robert S. A Lethal Obsession: Anti-Semitism from Antiquity to the Global Jihad. Random House. 2010. ISBN 978-1-4000-6097-9
