= Louis Loewe =

Silesian linguist

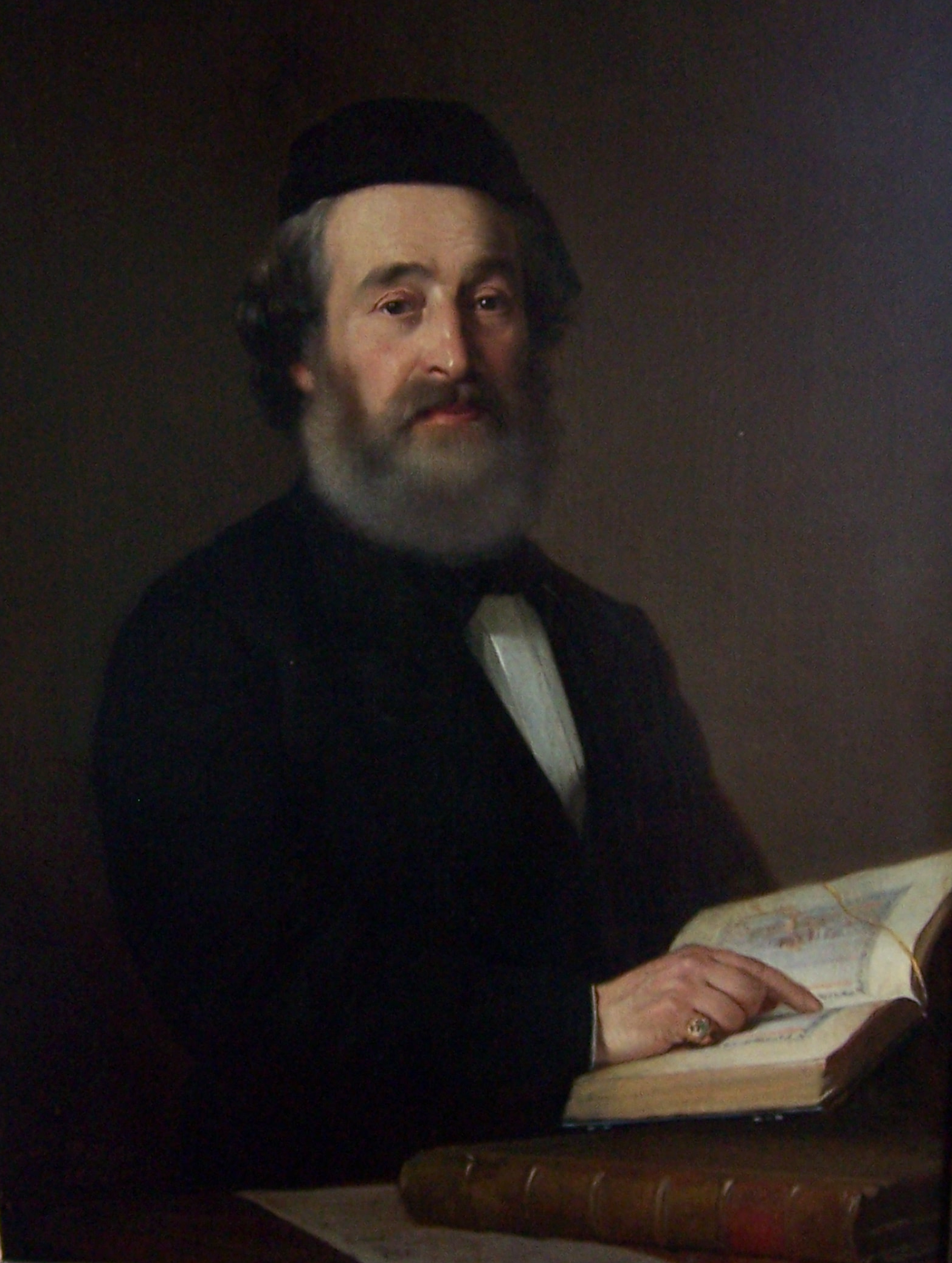
Portrait of Louis Loewe painted by Michael Angelo Pittatore (1825–1903) in 1871. This painting was commissioned by Sir Moses Montefiore (1784–1885) to be hung in the lecture hall of Ohel Moshe ve-Yehudit College at Ramsgate where Loewe was Principal.

Louis Loewe (1809–1888; also Louis Löwe) was a Silesian linguist. He served as principal and director of Judith Theological College for twenty years; he was a member of the Royal Asiatic Society, Numismatic Society and of the Asiatic Society of Paris.

== Life ==
He was born into a Jewish family at Zülz, Prussian Silesia. After attending Rosenburg Academy and the colleges of Lissa, Nikolsburg, and Presburg, he matriculated at the University of Berlin, where he took the degree of Ph.D.

On a visit to Hamburg he was given the task of arranging the Oriental coins in the Sprewitz collection. Coming to London, he obtained introductions to the Duke of Sussex and Admiral Sir Sidney Smith, through whom he became known to scholars and patrons of learning in England. He visited Oxford, Cambridge, and Paris.

In 1836 he undertook, under the auspices of the Duke of Sussex and Sir Sidney Smith, a three years' tour in the Middle East, to extend his knowledge of its languages. Near Safed, he was robbed by Druses, and continued his journey through Palestine in Bedouin dress. In 1839 the Duke of Sussex appointed Loewe his persona lecturer on the oriental tongues.

In 1839 Loewe went to study in the Vatican Library, and Sir Moses Montefiore passed through Rome on his second journey to the Palestine. Loewe had been Montefiore's guest, at Ramsgate in 1835, and he accepted an invitation to accompany Montefiore as his secretary. They struck up a long-lasting relationship. On the mission to Damascus and Constantinople in 1840, and on a dozen more journeys from 1839 to 1874, Loewe accompanied Montefiore.

In 1840 he addressed a large mixed congregation in the synagogue at Galata in four languages. On 25 March 1841 he was presented by Montefiore to Queen Victoria. In 1846 Loewe delivered two lectures on the Samaritans at Sussex Hall, London and in the same year he lectured at the Great Synagogue of Vilna, on the occasion of Montefiore's mission to Russia.

He was appointed first principal of Jews College in 1856, but soon resigned the office. He became examiner for oriental languages to the Royal College of Preceptors in 1858, and in the same year opened a Jewish boarding-school at Brighton. When in 1868 Montefiore founded the Judith Theological College at Ramsgate, he chose Loewe as principal and director, and he was in that post for twenty years.

Early in 1888 Loewe moved to London, and he died on 5 November 1888 at 53 Warwick Road, Maida Hill. He was buried at Willesden. He is said to have shunned public life. Loewe married in 1844, and his widow survived him, together with three sons and four daughters.

== Works ==
Sir Moses Montefiore in his will named Loewe one of his executors, and directed that he should be entrusted with all his diaries and other private papers to enable him to undertake the task of writing a biography of Lady Montefiore. This became a biography of Sir Moses also. It was completed in June 1888, and published in 1890 as Diaries of Sir Moses and Lady Montefiore. Edited by L. Loewe, 2 vols.

In 1841 Loewe prepared an English translation of Efés Dammîm, a series of conversations at Jerusalem between a patriarch of the Greek Orthodox Church and a chief rabbi, written in Hebrew by Isaac Baer Levinsohn in 1839, on the occasion of a blood libel in Soslow, Poland. The circulation of the translation was subsidised by Montefiore. In 1842 Loewe translated the first two conversations in Matteh Dan by Chacham David Nieto, as 'The Rod of Judgment.'

He published also Observations on a unique Cufic Gold Coin, issued by Mustali, tenth Caliph of the Fatimite Dynasty, London, 1849, and A Dictionary of the Circassian Language, London, 1854, first printed in the Transactions of the Philological Society.
