= Montefiore Synagogue =

Orthodox historic synagogue in Kent, England

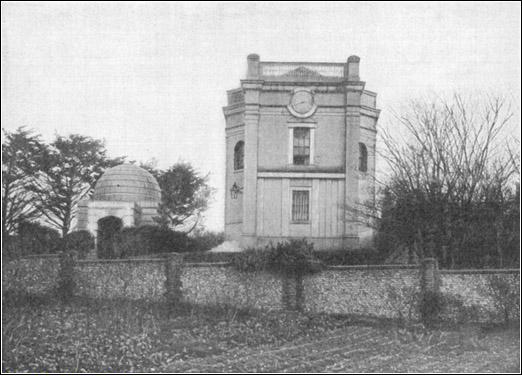
- Montefiore Synagogue and mausoleum, c. 1906

- Location of the synagogue in Kent

Religion
- Affiliation: Orthodox Judaism
- Rite: Spanish & Portuguese Sefardi
- Ecclesiastical or organizational status: Synagogue
- Ownership: Montefiore Endowment
- Status: Active (by appointment)

Location
- Location: Honeysuckle Road, Hereson, Ramsgate, Kent, England CT11 8AA
- Country: United Kingdom
- Interactive map of Montefiore Synagogue
- Grid position: grid reference TR3883865734
- Coordinates: 51°20′26″N 1°25′40″E

Architecture
- Architect: David Mocatta
- Type: Synagogue architecture
- Style: Regency
- Founder: Sir Moses Montefiore
- Funded by: Sir Moses Montefiore
- Completed: 1833

Listed Building – Grade II*
- Official name: Synagogue and adjacent Outbuilding
- Type: Listed building
- Designated: 12 August 1968
- Reference no.: 1051632

Listed Building – Grade II
- Official name: Entrance gates with gatepiers to north west of the Montefiore Synagogue
- Type: Listed building
- Designated: 12 October 1999
- Reference no.: 1378741

Listed Building – Grade II
- Official name: Ramsgate Gentlemans Toilet at Montefiore Synagogue and Mausoleum
- Type: Listed building
- Designated: 9 September 2003
- Reference no.: 1390615

The Montefiore Synagogue is the private Orthodox Jewish synagogue and adjacent mausoleum of the late Sir Moses Montefiore, located on Honeysuckle Road, Hereson, in Ramsgate, Kent, England, in the United Kingdom.

The private synagogue was completed in 1833 and, together with the mausoleum, was listed as a Grade II* building in 1968. The synagogue and mausoleum are cared for and maintained by the Montefiore Endowment, that also maintains the nearby Ramsgate Jewish Cemetery.

== History ==
Sir Moses Montefiore first came to Ramsgate in 1812 on his honeymoon with his wife Judith Cohen, sister-in-law to Nathan Rothschild. Ramsgate had had a small Jewish community since 1786. The synagogue was in the European tradition of great men having private chapels on their estates. Sir Moses Montefiore had the synagogue built immediately upon purchasing East Cliff Lodge in 1831. On the day the building was dedicated, Montefiore fulfilled the Jewish custom of marking such an occasion by giving charity to the poor by giving money to be distributed by the priests of the two neighbouring Church of England parishes. David Mocatta, a cousin, was hired to design the Synagogue. Mocatta estimated the cost at between £1,500 and £1,600 exclusive of the interior which was to cost from £300 to £400. The foundation stone was laid on the New Moon of Tammuz 5691 or 9 August 1831.

In 1869, Montefiore founded the Lady Judith Montefiore Theological College, a yeshivah. This was located to the rear of the synagogue; it was demolished in 1965. The work of the college is continued today in London, by the Montefiore Endowment. The site of the college is now owned by Ramsgate Town Council and maintained by volunteers as a dedicated woodland.

East Cliff Lodge was demolished in 1954. The grounds are now the King George VI Memorial Park. The c. 1870 entrance gates, gate-house and Italianate greenhouse are standing, (Note: Located at 51°20′33″N 1°26′02″E Grid reference TR 39254 65977) and were listed as Grade II building in 1999. A mid-to-late 19th-century lavatory block was listed as a Grade II building in 2003.

In 2007 a general medical practice opened on the grounds of the former estate. The developer contributed funds to preserve the woodlands next to the historic synagogue.

The Sephardi rite of the synagogue is that of the Bevis Marks Synagogue in the City of London. Regular services are no longer held due to a lack of a local Sephardi congregation.

== Architecture ==
The building is set on a knoll that, in Montefiore's day, overlooked extensive gardens.

The synagogue is a noted example of ecclesiastical Regency architecture. The building was the first purpose-built synagogue in Britain designed by a Jewish architect. The stucco-covered masonry building is rectangular with canted corners and a semicircular apse to accommodate the Torah Ark. The small vestibule contains the stairway of the women's gallery. The façade features a clock, which is the only example in an English synagogue. The clock bears the motto, Time flies, virtue alone remains. The Montefiore coat of arms was a later addition to the façade.

The typically Regency interior features an octagonal dome with a lantern to admit daylight, and a window over the Torah Ark. The interior was originally of whitewashed plaster. The pink, grey and cream marble and granite walls and much of the furniture were added by Montefiore's heirs in 1912. Oak furniture and iron gallery supports were added in 1933. Windows on the northeast and southeast walls with stained glass were also added in 1933.

The synagogue is illuminated by candles in the original chandeliers. The gallery is curtained by an old-fashioned, tall latticework. It retains Lady Montefiore's original seat, no. 3. Sir Moses' seat is on the ground floor. In 1933, the original wooden board with the prayer for the Royal Family was moved to the synagogue in Bristol.

In the lobby there is a memorial to a member of the family, Captain Robert Sebag-Montefiore who was killed in Gallipoli during World War I.

== Mausoleum ==
Montefiore Mausoleum
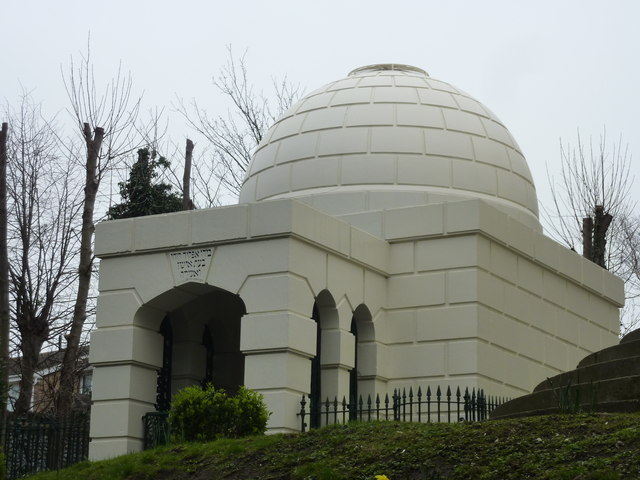
- The Montefiore Mausoleum, built as a replica of Rachel's Tomb
- Interactive map of Montefiore Mausoleum

Details
- Location: Honeysuckle Road, Hereson, Ramsgate, Kent, England CT11 8AA
- Country: United Kingdom
- Type: Jewish family
- Style: Mausoleum
- Owned by: Montefiore Endowment
- No. of interments: 2: Sir Moses Montefiore; Judith, Lady Montefiore

Next to the synagogue is the tomb which is the final resting place of Sir Moses and Judith, Lady Montefiore. Built as a replica of Rachel's Tomb on the road from Jerusalem to Bethlehem, the Montefiore mausoleum is cube surmounted by a dome. It has an open, arched porch. The interior has a stained glass skylight but no other decoration. The two graves are marked by identical chest tombs of Aberdeen marble. The graves face east, towards Jerusalem. The floor is made of Minton tile. The porch features ironwork grills in intricate Moorish patterns.

Above the porch of the Mausoleum is the following inscription. It is taken from the last verse of the Hebrew hymn Adon Olam: "Within Thy hand I lay my soul / Both when I sleep and when I wake. / And with my soul my body too, / My Lord is with me, I shall not fear".

Beyond the tomb there is a short, Roman pillar of Egyptian porphyry. The pillar was a gift from Mehmet Ali (1768-1849), khedive of Egypt, with whom Montefiore established friendly relations. It was placed there by Lady Montefiore to indicate where she wished to be buried. Lady Montefiore died in 1862.

Montefiore was granted permission by the Ottoman Empire to restore Rachel's Tomb during an 1841 visit to the Levant.

In August 1973, it was reported that the Israeli government had tried to have the remains of Sir Moses moved to Israel.

== See also ==
- History of the Jews in England
- List of synagogues in the United Kingdom
