= Montefiore Hospital =

Montefiore Hospital may refer to:

- Montefiore Hospital, Hove, Hove, Sussex, England, United Kingdom
- Montefiore Medical Center, the teaching hospital of the Albert Einstein College of Medicine, New York City, United States
- Montefiore New Rochelle Hospital, a teaching hospital in New Rochelle, Westchester, New York, United States
- UPMC Montefiore, founded as Montefiore Hospital in 1908, now part of University of Pittsburgh Medical Center in Pittsburgh, Pennsylvania, United States

== See also ==
- Montefiore (disambiguation)
- Sir Moses Montefiore Home, residential elderly care facilities in Hunters Hill and Woollahra, New South Wales, Australia
