= Jacob Barrow Montefiore =

Member of the South Australian Colonization Commission

Jacob Barrow Montefiore (1801–1895) was a member of the South Australian Colonization Commission in London from 1835 to 1839, a body appointed by the British Government under King William IV to oversee implementation of the South Australia Act 1834, which established the Colony of South Australia.

Montefiore Hill in North Adelaide, the location of Light's Vision (a statue of founding father Colonel Light), is named after Montefiore.

== Early life ==
Montefiore was eldest son of Eliezer Montefiore, owner of a sugar plantation in Barbados with a home in London, and Judith (née Barrow). They were a wealthy family of Sephardi Jews, and his youngest brother Joseph Barrow Montefiore (1803–1893) was educated in London and lived in the city.

== Colonial interests ==
Jacob got involved with trading produce in the colonies, and developed an interest in the Australian colonies, investing in the Swan River Colony (now Perth and Western Australia) in 1829, and also shared real estate interests in the Colony of New South Wales with his brother Joseph.

The two brothers were partners in J. Barrow Montefiore & Co, and helped to found the Bank of Australasia, later the ANZ Bank; Jacob was a founding director, while Joseph was the Sydney representative. Both brothers suffered London bankruptcy proceedings in 1844.

He became a member of the South Australian Association, formed in 1833 by a group consisting of men of varied backgrounds, from philanthropists to merchants, and including Edward Gibbon Wakefield, Robert Gouger, Robert Torrens Sr and George Fife Angas, who wished to create a new British province in southern Australia.

In May 1835 he was appointed to the board of South Australian Colonization Commissioners in London, who were responsible for establishing the new British Province of South Australia. He remained a Commissioner until 1839. Montefiore and fellow Commissioner Lieutenant-Colonel George Palmer were responsible for fulfilling all of the agents' and other requirements for the "First Fleet of South Australia" in 1836, under the command of Colonel Light. As part of the process, the pair trialled a new code for emigrant ships, requiring that a ship's surgeon had to travel on any ship with over 100 passengers. It also specified a minimum deck height. This reform, leading to reduced deaths at sea, was adopted for all British emigrant ships in 1839. As the Commission's first two ships, Rapid and Cygnet, were readying for the voyage to Australia in August 1836 (the South Australian Company having sent the first three ships in July), Montefiore and Palmer helped Colonel Light to prepare the ships.

== Later life ==
The Governor of South Australia, Sir George Grey, received Montefiore when he travelled to South Australia in 1843. By the time he visited again in 1854, his brother Joseph was in Adelaide and once again successful in business, as proprietor of JB Montefiore & Co. Jacob Montefiore was a keen advocate for South Australia for the rest of his life, and full of praise for Light.

Four friends of Light – Palmer, Montefiore, Raikes Currie and Alexander Lang Elder, sent a silver bowl to the Mayor and Corporation of the City of Adelaide in 1859 as a gift. The bowl was to be used for toasting the memory of Light, a tradition which continues today.

Montefiore gifted a painted portrait of himself by Barnett Samuel Marks to the National Gallery of South Australia in 1885. He was appointed honorary commissioner of South Australia at the Colonial and Indian Exhibition in London in 1886.

He died in London in 1895.

== Other family relationships ==
- British philanthropist Moses Montefiore was a cousin of Jacob and Joseph.
- Jacob Levi Montefiore (1819–1885), New South Wales politician, was a nephew of the brothers. Jacob Levi (who arrived in Sydney in 1837) later became a director of the Bank of Australasia, in 1855.
- Eliezer Levi Montefiore (1820–1894), brother of Jacob Levi, who arrived in Adelaide by 1843 and married his cousin Esther Hannah Barrow Montefiore (Joseph Barrow's daughter) in 1848, there, was another nephew. The couple moved to Melbourne in 1853, and later to Sydney, where Eliezer was the first director of the Art Gallery of New South Wales.

=== Other siblings ===
- Moses Eliezer Montefiore (born 1798?) may have been a brother to Jacob and Joseph Barrow Montefiore. According to a genealogy on the Museum of the Jewish People's database, there were siblings as follows: Rachel, John (1854–1795, four children), Moses Eliezer, Evalina (m. Abraham Mocatta – same family as Joseph Barrow M's wife), Esther Hannah (who married Isaac Levi and had Levi Eliezer, see above). Moses Eliezer Montefiore's will, made in 1820 and proven in 1822, describes him as a merchant of the island of St Thomas in the West Indies, (Note: The island of St Thomas was not in British hands at this point, but had been between 1807. There are also parishes named St Thomas both on Jamaica and on Barbados. ?) then living in Finsbury in London. He leaves residual estate (other than that specified for siblings) to his father, Eliezer. (Note: This could be an indication that he expected to die before his father. ? If the DOB is correct, he would only have been about 22 when he died.) Other sources show an Eliezer Montefiore as owner of land in Jamaica, and a man of the same name appears in the Kingston slave registers.

=== Barbados Barrows ===
From will transcripts, all of which mention slaves:

- Simon Barrow of St Michael (will 21 May 1801): daughters Judith Barrow, Rebecca Barrow and Sarah Barrow; son Joseph; grandson Simon Barrow, son of late son Jacob.
- Joseph Barrow of St Michael (undated): wife Sarah. "After Sarah's death the Barbados house to go to Moses Eliezer Montefiore, son of my niece Judith Montefiore." (Niece Judith Montefiore is wife of Eliezer.)
- Sarah Barrow of St Michael (31 March 1814): "Relic of Joseph Barrow Esqr deceased."
