= Jacob Levi Montefiore =

Australian businessman and politician

Jacob Montefiore

Member of the New South Wales Legislative Council
- In office 3 November 1874 – 23 July 1877
- In office 22 May 1856 – 23 April 1860

Personal details
- Born: Jacob Levi; 11 January 1819 Bridgetown, Barbados
- Died: 24 January 1885 (aged 66) London, England
- Spouse: Caroline Louyet (m. 1851)
- Relations: Eliezer Levi Montefiore (brother)
- Occupation: Financier

Jacob Levi Montefiore (11 January 1819 – 24 January 1885) was a British businessman and financier known for his activities in the Australian colony of New South Wales.

== Early life ==
He was born at Bridgetown in Barbados to merchant Isaac Jacob Levi and his wife Esther Hannah Montefiore, who was related to Sir Moses Montefiore and the Rothschilds. The children adopted their mother's surname, including Jacob's younger brother Eliezer Levi Montefiore.

== New South Wales ==
In New South Wales he was a squatter and trader. On 9 July 1851 he married Caroline Antonine Gerardine Louyet in London. He was a member of the New South Wales Legislative Council from 1856 to 1860 and again from 1874 to 1877. He was Belgian Consul from 1863. He also published works on economic theory, was chairman of a number of mining companies, campaigned for free trade, and composed the libretto for the opera Don John of Austria with music by Isaac Nathan.

== Personal life ==
Montefiore died in London on 24 January 1885 (aged 66).

He was a nephew of Jacob Barrow Montefiore and Joseph Barrow Montefiore.
