= John Israel Montefiore =

New Zealand trader and merchant

John Israel Montefiore (1807 – 14 February 1898), also known as John Julius Montefiore, was one of the first Jewish settlers in New Zealand. He became a trader and merchant in the Far North District of the country, and was later active in business and civic affairs in Auckland.

He was born in London, England in 1807. The Australian merchant and financier Joseph Barrow Montefiore was his cousin.

Montefiore left London and arrived in Sydney in 1829. He left Sydney in October 1831, travelling to Tauranga, New Zealand. By 1836, he had established himself as a merchant in Kororareka (present day Russell) in the Far North District. Later that year, he returned to Sydney. In March 1840, one month after the signing of the Treaty of Waitangi, he returned to Kororareka and again opened a store.

In March 1841, he went to Auckland and traded land, settling permanently there soon after and establishing a merchant store. He was a foundation member and supporter of the fledgling Jewish congregation, and with David Nathan secured a grant of land in 1843 on the corner of Karangahape Road and Symonds Street for a Jewish section of the Symonds Street Cemetery, Auckland. He became a shareholder in an Auckland newspaper, and in 1846 was one of the founders of the Auckland Savings Bank.

Around 1850, he travelled back to London, but in 1855 returned to Auckland under the persuasion of John Logan Campbell and managed some of Campbell's business interests, also becoming involved in civic affairs in Auckland.

John Israel Montefiore eventually returned via Sydney to London, and died in Hampshire on 14 February 1898.

== See also ==
- History of the Jews in New Zealand
