= Adam Montefiore =

British-born Israeli wine expert

Adam S. Montefiore (born 10 November 1957 in London) is a British-born Israeli wine trade veteran, ex-winery insider, wine critic, wine writer and author.

== Biography ==
Adam Sebag Montefiore was born in Kensington, London. His father was Dr. Stephen Eric Sebag-Montefiore, descended from a line of wealthy Sephardi Jews who were diplomats and bankers in Italy and Morocco. His mother was April Sebag-Montefiore (née Jaffe) from a family of poor Lithuanian Jewish scholars. He is the great-great-grandson of Sir Joseph Sebag-Montefiore, nephew and heir of Sir Moses Montefiore. He is the brother of Hugh Sebag-Montefiore, a writer, Rupert Sebag-Montefiore, ex-chairman of Savills estate agents and Simon Sebag-Montefiore, a historian. He was educated at Wellesley House and Wellington College.

Montefiore immigrated to Israel in 1989. He lives in Ra'anana, north of Tel Aviv. He and Gillian (Jill) Leah Montefiore were married in 1982. She died in 2015. He has three children, Dr. Liam Murphy Sebag-Montefiore, David Jonathan Montefiore and Rachel Leah Montefiore, and seven grandchildren. His current partner, since 2017, is Daphna Sternfeld.

== Wine career ==
Adam Montefiore is a specialist in Israeli wine. He has been referred to as 'The Ambassador of Israeli Wine,' and 'The English Voice of Israeli Wine.' He is the Wine Writer for the Jerusalem Post and has written books on Israeli wine.

Montefiore worked for Charrington (Bass Charrington) and Crest Hotels International (Bass Hotels & Resorts)[ in the UK, starting in beer and moving into wine. He studied wine at the WSET and was a founder member of The Academy of Wine Service. He was presented with Honorary Membership because of his efforts to raise standards of wine service. He first started working with Israeli wine in the 1980s, helping Yarden, Gamla and Golan wines gain a foothold in the UK. After moving to Israel in 1989, he worked for Israeli wineries for twenty seven years. In the 1990s he worked for the Golan Heights Winery, the pioneering winery of Israel. In the 2000s he worked with Carmel (including Yatir Winery), the historic winery of Israel. He founded Handcrafted Wines of Israel, the first time Israeli wineries worked together, and played a significant role in the development of Israeli wines. .

He has been the Wine Writer of The Jerusalem Post since 2010. He is the biographer of the Golan Heights Winery and Domaine du Castel, arguably Israel's two most famous wineries, and author of The Wine Route of Israel and Wines of Israel. He also writes about wine for the Jewish Chronicle and www.wines-Israel.com . He contributes to Hugh Johnson's Pocket Wine Book, Oz Clarke's Wine A to Z, The World Atlas of Wine, The Sotheby's Wine Encyclopedia, The Wine Encyclopedia (DK) and writes the section on Israel and Kosher for Jancis Robinson MW's Oxford Companion to Wine. He is a member of The Circle of Wine Writers.

Currently, he is CEO of Adam Montefiore Wine Consultancy , offering services to wineries, retailers, hotels, restaurants and private individuals, and partner of The Israel Wine Experience , which educates about Israeli wine and advances wine tourism.

He has won three Gourmand Awards, known as the Oscars for food and wine books, for Best Northern Hemisphere Wine Book (Domaine du Castel); Best World of Wine Book of the Year (Golan Heights Winery) and Best of the Best, Gourmand Awards 1995-2025 (Domaine du Castel.)

In 2024, he was presented with the prestigious Terravino Lifetime Achievement Award in honor of his contribution to Israeli wine. .

== Published works ==
- The Book of New Israeli Food, J. Gur 2007 (contributor)
- 120 Harvests, Carmel Winery, 2010, with A.Ravid
- The Wine Route of Israel, 2012, edited by E. Sacks
- Wines of Israel, 2012, edited by E. Sacks
- Wines of Israel, Israel Export Institute, 2013
- The Wine Route of Israel, 2015, edited by E. Sacks
- Shvill Ha'Yayin, 2016, edited by E. Sacks
- Wines of Israel, 2020, edited by E. Sacks
- Domaine du Castel: The Biography, 2023
- Yikvei Ramat Hagolan, 2023
- Golan Heights Winery: Forty Years of Quality, Innovation and Authenticity, 2024
- Time and Place, Tzora Vineyards, 2024 (contributor)
- Domaine du Castel: Habiographia, 2026.
