= Joshua Montefiore =

British lawyer and military officer

Joshua Vita Montefiore (10 August 1762 – 26 June 1843) was a British lawyer and military officer.

== Life ==
Montefiore was born to Jewish parents in the City of London. He was educated at the University of Oxford. He was called to the bar in 1784.

In 1794, Montefiore returned to England from the colonies and declined a knighthood. Shortly after his return, he became the first Jew to hold the rank of Captain in the British Army. His nephew was Moses Montefiore.

He wrote extensively on the legal profession.

=== Bibliography ===
- An Authentic Account of the Late Expedition to Bulam on the Coast of Africa: With a Description of the Present Settlement of Sierra Leone and the Adjacent Country (1794)
- The Law of Copyright: Being a Compendium of Acts of Parliament and Adjudged Cases, Relative to Authors, Publishers, Printers, Artists, Musical Composers, Print-sellers (1802)
- Commercial and Notarial Precedents: Consisting of All the Most Approved Forms, Special and Common, which are Required in Transactions of Business (1802)
- A Commercial Dictionary: Containing the Present State of Mercantile Law, Practice, and Custom, Intended for the Use of the Cabinet, the Counting-house, and the Library (1803)
- The trader's and manufacturer's compendium: containing the laws, customs, and regulations, relative to the trade (1804)
- The American Trader's Compendium: Containing the Laws, Customs, and Regulations of the United States, Relative to Commerce (1811)
- Synopsis of Mercantile Laws: With an Appendix: Containing the Most Approved Forms of Notarial and Commercial Precedents, Special and Common, Required in the Daily Transaction of Business (1830)

== Notes ==
- Montefiore at The Jewish Lives Project, the Jewish Museum London
