= Georges Montefiore-Levi =

Belgian politician and inventor of phosphor bronze (1832–1906)

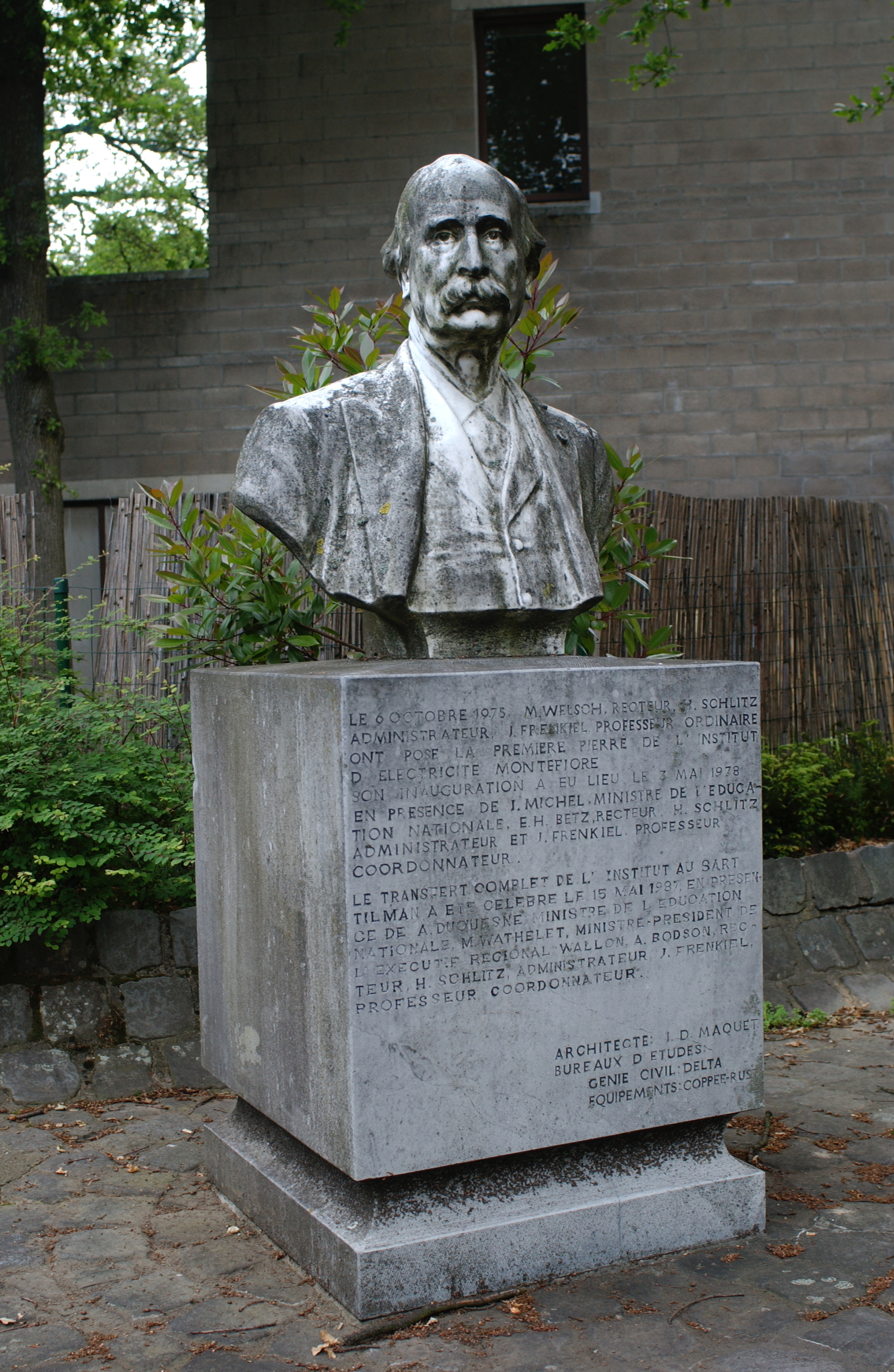
- Bust of Montefiore in Liège (Belgium)
- Born: 18 February 1832; Streatham, United Kingdom
- Died: 24 April 1906 (aged 74); Brussels, Belgium
- Known for: Inventor of phosphorus bronze
- Spouse: Hortense Bischoffsheim (m. 1866–1901)

Senator
- In office 1882–1901

Georges Montefiore-Levi (18 February 1832 – 24 April 1906) was a Belgian politician, industrialist and inventor of Jewish extraction who created the first phosphorus bronze.

== Early life ==
He was born in Streatham, South London. His father, Isaac Levi, was a merchant, and his mother was a first cousin of financier Moses Montefiore.

== Career ==
A businessman and an active philanthropist, Montefiore-Levi represented Liège in the Senate from 1882 to 1901, and he was the president of the 1892 international monetary conference that met in Brussels.

Montefiore-Levi founded one of Belgium's oldest engineering schools, the Institut Montefiore in Liège, and it later became part of the University of Liège. He also established an asylum for convalescent children in Esneux that he named after his wife. He had an interest in photography and was once president of the Belgian Association of Photography. He improved existing technology so that it was possible to take up to fifteen wax-paper negatives without opening a camera, and he introduced a canopy that allowed for the immediate processing of collodion negatives.

In 1866, he married Hortense Bischoffsheim, daughter of Jonathan-Raphaël Bischoffsheim. He died at his home in Brussels in 1906.
