= Henry Barnston =

Rabbi (1868–1949)

Henry Barston
- Born: Henry Barnstein; August 23, 1868; Dover, England
- Died: December 11, 1949 (aged 81); Houston, TX
- Burial place: Beth Israel Mausoleum
- Education: University of Heidelberg
- Occupation: Rabbi
- Years active: 1897-1943
- Known for: Interfaith work throughout Texas

Henry Barnston (August 23, 1868 – December 11, 1949) was a British-born American rabbi.

== Life ==
Barnston was born on August 23, 1868, in Dover, England, the son of Rabbi Isidore Jules Barnstein and Eva Mendelsohn. He was born Henry Barnstein, but he changed his surname to Barnston during World War I to make it sound less German.

Barnston attended private school in Dover. He graduated from the University of London with a B.A. in 1890, Montefiore College in Ramsgate with a B.A. in 1893, and the University of Heidelberg with an M.A. and a Ph.D. in 1896. He preached before the Sephardic Congregation in London and was associated with the Jewish Domestic Training Service. He was ordained a rabbi in London in 1897 and received his rabbinic diploma from Haham Moses Gaster. He worked as a Hebrew instructor at St. Augustine's Church School in Kilburn and as a German instructor for the London School Board.

Seeking a more conductive atmosphere to practice liberal Judaism, Barnston immigrated to the United States in 1900 and became rabbi of the Reform Congregation Beth Israel in Houston, Texas. Under Barnston, a new temple was built that was described by one source as the finest in the American Southwest and the congregation grew tenfold. He became rabbi emeritus in 1943, serving in that position until his death. He was a founder of the Jewish Welfare Service, the Texas Kallah of Rabbis, the Community Chest, and the Houston Symphony Society (which later became the Houston Symphony Orchestra. He was also president of the local B'nai B'rith and the Texas Association of Rabbis. He didn't take a public stand on civil rights, although he joined with the First Methodist Church in an unprecedented act of ecumenical defiance against the Ku Klux Klan. He was a member and supporter of the anti-Zionist American Council for Judaism, although he resisted pressure from his congregation to be more active in the organization.

Barnston was active in interfaith work throughout Texas, serving as a leader in the National Conference of Christian and Jews and as a civilian chaplain to U.S. Army camps in the Houston area during both World Wars. He conducted memorial services in virtually every church in the Houston area, including for Queen Victoria and William McKinley in the Christ Church Cathedral. He was a founder and secretary of the Houston Art Museum, vice-president of the Social Service Federation of Houston, and a director of the Public Library Association, the Family Service Bureau, the Humane Defense League, the Texas Prison Relief Association, and the Planned Parenthood Association of Houston. He delivered baccalaureate addresses at several colleges, including the Rice Institute in 1926 and the Hebrew Union College and the Southeastern Louisiana College in 1942.

Barnston wrote Targum of Onkeles in 1896, collaborated with Gustaf Dalman on Chaldäisches Wörterbuch and Aramäische Dialektproben, and assisted Emil Friedrich Kautzsch with his dictionary of the Targum. He lectured for the Jewish Chautauqua Society at Tulane University and the University of Louisiana. He contributed to The Jewish Quarterly Review, The Menorah Journal, The Jewish Chronicle, The American Hebrew, the Israel, the Reform Advocate, The Jewish Encyclopedia, and the Encyclopedia of Jewish Knowledge.

Barnston was a member of the American Asiatic Society, the Central Conference of American Rabbis, Pi Tau Pi, the Ministerial Alliance of Houston, and the Houston Rotary Club. In 1910, he married Ethel Irene Kennard of Kensington, England. Their children were Vivienne Adele and Alfred Jules. Ethel died in 1917. In 1920, he married Ethel's sister Ruth Nina. They had one child, Jack Dudley. Alfred was ordained a rabbi by his father in 1947 and by 1949 was rabbi of the Union Temple of Brooklyn.

Barnston died in Hermann Hospital on December 11, 1949. He was buried in the Beth Israel Mausoleum.
