= Joseph Barrow Montefiore =

British merchant and financier (1803–1893)

- Born: 24 June 1803
- Died: 8 September 1893 (aged 90)

Joseph Barrow Montefiore (24 June 1803 – 8 September 1893), merchant and financier, was the youngest son of Eliezer Montefiore, merchant, of Barbados and London, and his wife, Judith (née Barrow).

Montefiore was born on 24 June 1803 in London and was educated there. He married Rebecca Mocatta, and the couple had children.

He shared real estate interests in the Colony of New South Wales with his brother Jacob Barrow Montefiore. The two brothers were also partners in J. Barrow Montefiore & Co., and helped to found the Bank of Australasia, later the ANZ Bank; Jacob was a founding director, while Joseph was the Sydney representative. Among Joseph’s many investments in Australia were two ships that made five whaling voyages between 1830 and 1839.

Both brothers suffered London bankruptcy proceedings in 1844, but by the time of Jacob's second visit to Adelaide in 1854, Joseph was once again a successful businessman, as proprietor of J. B. Montefiore & Co. It was during the 1840s–1850s that he was resident in Adelaide, in St John's Street.

He died on 8 September 1893 in Brighton. His estate was sworn for probate at £1,250,000 (equivalent to $133,000,000 in 2023).

== Other family relationships ==
- British philanthropist Moses Montefiore was a cousin of Jacob and Joseph.
- Jacob Levi Montefiore (1819–1885), New South Wales politician, was a nephew of the brothers. Jacob Levi (who arrived in Sydney in 1837) later became a director of the Bank of Australasia, in 1855.
- Eliezer Levi Montefiore, brother of Jacob Levi, who married his Joseph's daughter (i.e. Eliezer's cousin) Esther Hannah Barrow Montefiore in Adelaide, was another nephew.

=== Other siblings ===
- Moses Eliezer Montefiore (born 1798?) may have been a brother to Jacob and Joseph Barrow Montefiore. According to a genealogy on the Museum of the Jewish People's database, there were siblings as follows: Rachel, John (1854–1795, four children), Moses Eliezer, Evalina (m. Abraham Mocatta – same family as Joseph Barrow M's wife), Esther Hannah (who married Isaac Levi and had Levi Eliezer, see above).

=== Barbados Barrows ===
From will transcripts:

- Simon Barrow of St Michael (will 21 May 1801): daughters Judith Barrow, Rebecca Barrow and Sarah Barrow; son Joseph; grandson Simon Barrow, son of late son Jacob.
- Joseph Barrow of St Michael (undated): wife Sarah. "After Sarah's death the Barbados house to go to Moses Eliezer Montefiore, son of my niece Judith Montefiore." (Niece Judith Montefiore is wife of Eliezer.)
- Sarah Barrow of St Michael (31 March 1814): "Relic of Joseph Barrow Esqr deceased."
