= Paul Goodman (Zionist) =

British Zionist

- Born: 1875; Dorpat, Estonia
- Died: 1949 (aged 73–74)
- Known for: Zionism in London

Paul Goodman (1875–1949) was a British Zionist. He served in multiple positions in the London movement and wrote for multiple Jewish and Zionist publications.

== Early life and career ==
Paul Goodman was born in Dorpat, Estonia in 1875, and emigrated to England in 1891. He served as the secretary of the Spanish and Portuguese Congregation and became a Zionist after hearing Theodor Herzl speak in London in 1896. He served Herzl's Zionist Organization and in multiple leadership positions within the London movement. He was appointed honorary secretary of the Political Committee by Chaim Weizmann and Nahum Sokolow prior to the Balfour Declaration. Goodman edited the periodical Zionist Review (1920–26, 1934–38), and wrote for multiple Jewish encyclopedias and Zionist publications. After his death in 1949, the Zionist Federation of Great Britain released a memorial tribute, The Rebirth of Israel, in 1952.

== Works ==
- The Synagogue and the Church (1908)
- History of the Jews (1911)
- Zionism: Problems and Views (1916, as co-editor)
- Moses Montefiore (1925)
- Zionism in England (1930)
- The Jewish National Home (1943)
- Chaim Weizmann: A Tribute on His Seventieth Birthday (1945, as editor)
