= Judith Lady Montefiore College =

English Jewish theological seminary

- יְשִׁיבָת אֹהֶל מֹשֶׁה וְיְהוּדִית
- Established: September 6, 1869; 156 years ago
- Founders: Sir Moses Montefiore
- Location: Ramsgate, Kent, England; 51.339997°N 1.428278°E

Judith Lady Montefiore College (Hebrew: יְשִׁיבָת אֹהֶל מֹשֶׁה וְיְהוּדִית, romanized: Yeshivat Ohel Moshe ve-Yehudit) is a Jewish theological seminary founded in 1869 by Sir Moses Montefiore in memory of his late wife, Lady Judith Montefiore, at Ramsgate, Kent. The College closed in 1985 but re-opened in London in 2005.

== Early history ==
The College initially took the form of a beit midrash attended by elderly men of learning who studied the Talmud there, under the directorship Dr. Louis Löwe. The Spanish and Portuguese Jews' Congregation in London assumed the administration of the College after Montefiore's death in 1885, and the College languished after the death of Löwe in 1888.

After Moses Gaster was appointed principal in 1890, the College was re-organized into a modern rabbinical training college. The former members of the institution were dismissed, and students between the age of 16 and 21 with a B.A. or comparable university degree were invited to move into the College for a period of five years to become academically trained rabbis. The College ordained its first two students, William Henry Greenburg and Henry Barnstein, on 4 November 1895, to much controversy.

Judith Lady Montefiore College was moved to London in 1961 (its building demolished in 1964), and closed in 1985. The site of the college is now owned by Ramsgate Town Council and maintained by volunteers as a dedicated woodland.

== Re-establishment ==
The College was re-opened in London in 2005 as a centre for higher Torah education. Its semikhah (ordination) programme was opened in January 2006 on the premises of and in co-operation with the Bevis Marks Synagogue. The four-year programme is accepted by the Rabbinical Council of America, and is now operated in collaboration with the Israel-based Kollel Eretz Hemda. Since November 2016, Montefiore has offered a programme for dayanim (rabbinic judges), also in collaboration with Eretz Hemda.
