= Safi Affair =

The Safi Affair of 1863 was an instance of antisemitic persecution based on an accusation of Jewish ritual murder of a Spaniard in the city of Safi in the Sultanate of Morocco.

== Blood libel ==
A fourteen-year-old Jewish boy named Jacob Benyuda, and another Jew named Elias Benillouz were accused by the Spanish vice-consul in Safi of poisoning a retired Spanish tax collector, who they worked for as domestic servants, in conspiracy with other Jews. The vice-consul demanded of the Makhzani, the local governor, that the accused be publicly executed, threatening Spanish military intervention if he refused. Both of the accused were executed after confessions were extracted through torture. Two other Jews were arrested and tortured in connection to the extracted confessions, one of whom was executed.

The Jews of Safi appealed to the Makhzan without success. They then turned to foreign Jewish organizations. The incident attracted international press attention, and the influential British-Jewish banker and philanthropist Moses Montefiore traveled to Morocco to intercede on behalf of Safi's Jews. Montefiore secured the release of two Jews held over the affair, as well as two Jews imprisoned over a separate matter. Montefiore had an audience with Sultan Muhammad IV, who subsequently issued a royal dahir (decree) on February 5, 1864, ordering his "servitors, governors, cadis, and other factionaries to treat with utmost benevolence the Israelites who are under the protection of our Empire".

However, Montefiore was unsuccessful in achieving formal legal equality for Morocco's Jews, such as the abolition of their Dhimmi status. According to historian Georges Bensoussan, the intervention of Montefiore may have intensified resentment of Jews in Morocco. The French consul in Mogador (Essaouira today) claimed in February 1864 that Montefiore's visit "risks[ed] over-exciting Muslim fanaticism and provoking acts of violence", while Arab chroniclers saw the intervention of a foreign Jew as an act of insubordination and evidence of a "world-wide 'Jewish conspiracy'".

== See also ==
- History of the Jews in Morocco
- Antisemitism in Morocco
- Moses Montefiore
- Blood libel
