= Montefiore Institute =

Coordinates: 50°35′10″N 5°33′38″E

The Montefiore Institute (French: Institut Montefiore) is the department of Electrical Engineering and Computer Science of the Faculty of Applied Sciences of the University of Liège, Belgium.

It was founded in 1883 and is named after Georges Montefiore-Levi.
