= Montefiore Club =

Coordinates: 45.494548°N 73.57618°W

- Type: Private members' club
- Genre: Jewish
- Founded: 1880
- Defunct: 2010
- Fate: Closed
- Headquarters: Montreal, Canada

The Montefiore Club was a private members' club, catering to the Jewish community, located in Montreal, Quebec, Canada.

== History ==
Founded in 1880, the club was originally called the "Montefiore Social and Dramatic Club", named for Sir Moses Haim Montefiore, the British-Jewish philanthropist. It was established by 11 people, all quite young, with ages ranging from 15 to 23, as a social club for young Jewish people. It held fundraising balls to help Jewish refugees, and plays that were produced to fund welfare programs for immigrants. Later renamed the "Montefoire Club", and modelled on upper class gentlemen's clubs of London, it functioned as a private social and business association, catering to members of the Jewish community.

Among its members, were "well-to-do" members of the Jewish community, who were excluded from elite Anglophone clubs such as the St. James and the Mount Royal.

In the early 1990s, the club had more than 600 paying members. In the mid-1990s, $500,000 was spent on renovations to the building.

In 2005, after experiencing a decline in membership, new policies were introduced:

- Annual fees were reduced
- Women were admitted as full members
- The dress code was relaxed
- New activities were introduced including luncheon speakers and wine workshops

In its final years, the building was used frequently by Concordia University, usually for social events. In the summer of 2010, after experiencing years of financial difficulties, the club closed.

== The club ==
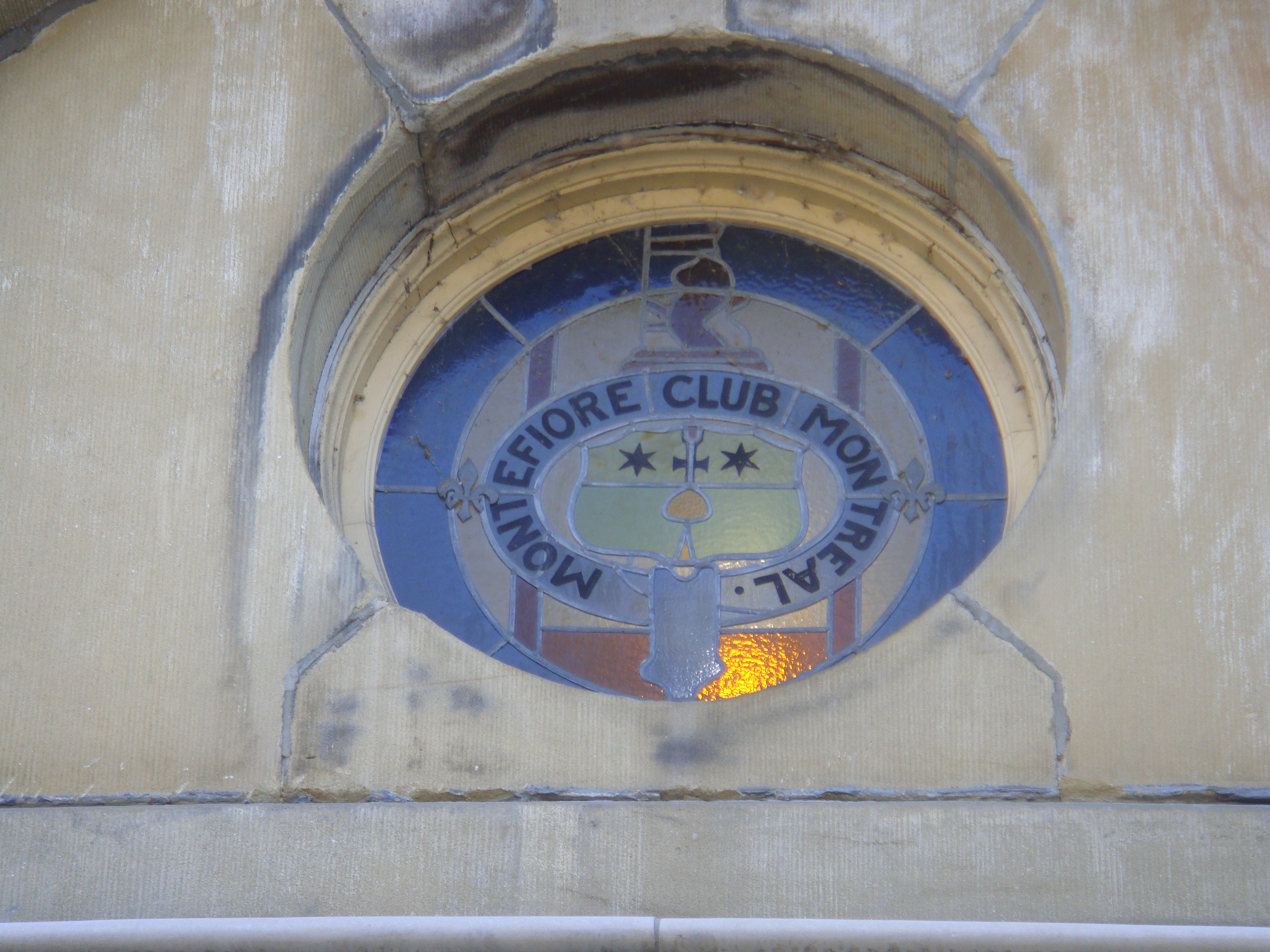
The club's emblem in a window above the front door of the clubhouse

To obtain membership, a contribution to the life of Montreal's Jewish community was prerequisite.

The location of the Montefoire Club itself changed locations three times, the last being its 1195 Guy Street address, where it remained for 104 years, until its closure. The Guy Street location displayed no sign, with only a green canopy identifying it. The building is a large, three-storey Victorian greystone.

The Guy Street location had a luxurious interior, with high ceilings, and a lobby built with large oak beams in a Dutch style. The rooms were carpeted, with deep-cushioned chairs and sofas, and walls of fine carved wood. Card rooms were located on the second floor, with bedrooms on the third floor that were made available on a temporary basis for members. Wives and children were forbidden access to the second and third floors.

The club was open seven days a week, and often rented out its facilities for community events. The cuisine was considered among the finest in the city, and although having a Jewish clientele, the club was never kosher.

== Notable meetings ==
Throughout its history, the club was as a venue for many notable meetings involving prominent members of the Jewish community.

- The establishment of the forerunner of the Federation CJA.
- The planning of the Jewish General Hospital.
- A meeting of Canadian Jewish leaders was convened by Samuel Bronfman and Sam Steinberg during the Six-Day War. In that single afternoon, $13 million was raised.

== Closure ==
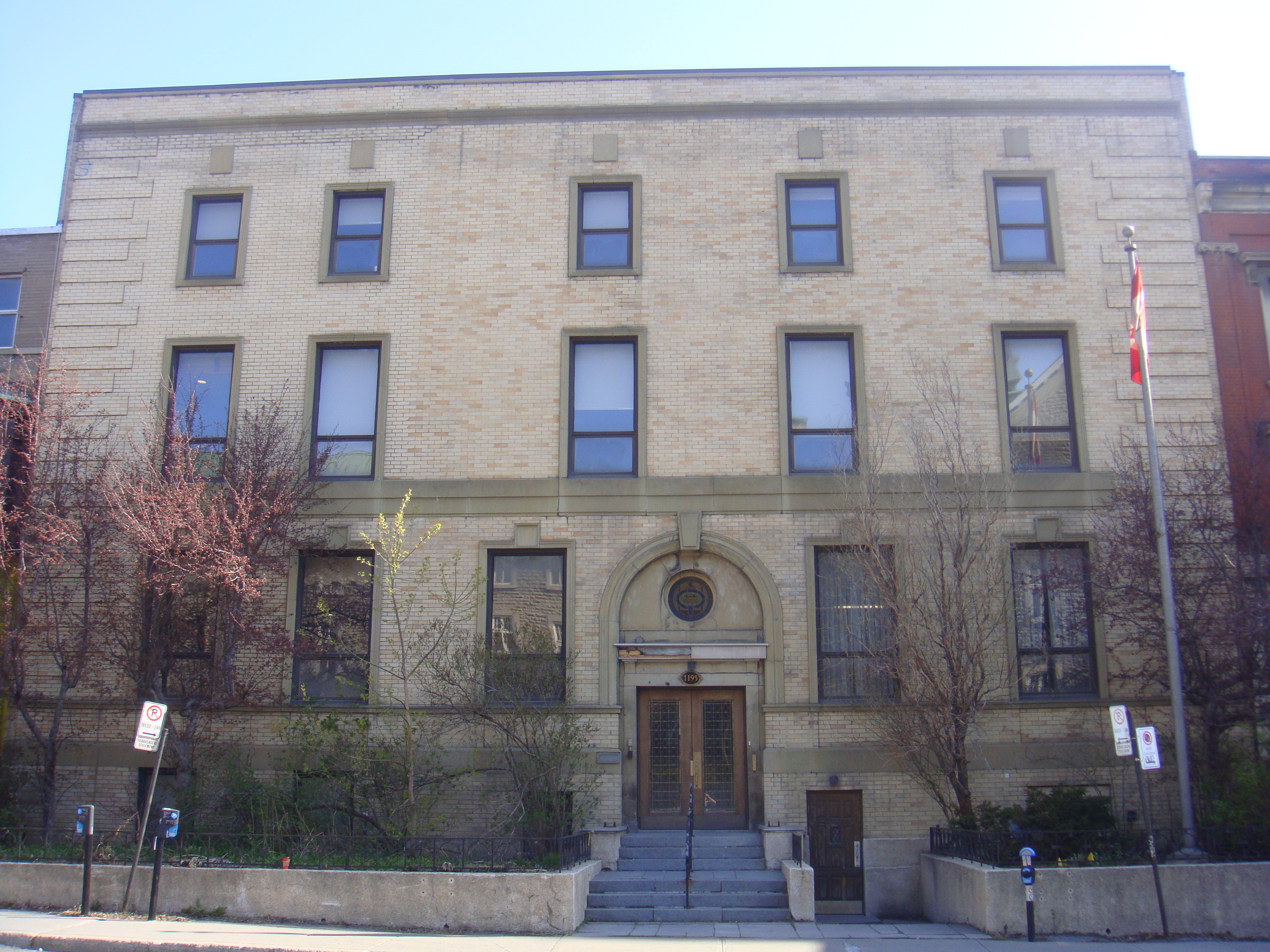
The former Montefiore Club building at 1195 Guy Street, in 2015

In the summer of 2010, after operating for 130 years, and with only 72 paying members, the club closed. It had been experiencing financial difficulties, and had insufficient membership to remain open.

At the time of its closure, the club had used all of its financial reserves, and was operating at a deficit of approximately $25,000 per month. With an annual operating budget of about $750,000, and full fees being only about $2,000 (among the lowest for Montreal's private clubs), the club was unable to remain operation.

The organization sold the building to Concordia University in 2010. It will be renovated, and then used for meetings, events, and academic conferences.

The proceeds from the sale of the premises will be used to pay costs and staff severances. Remaining funds, expected to amount to approximately $1.5 million, will be donated to the Jewish Community Foundation of Montreal for Jewish education, and to Concordia University to fund a Jewish studies endowment.

The contents of the building, which includes artwork, will be auctioned to members, with remaining items made available to the general public.

The club plans to donate its substantial archives to the Jewish Public Library.

== Members ==
Notable former members include:

- Leo Kolber
- Harry Blank
- Samuel Bronfman
- Charles Bronfman
- Sam Steinberg

== Presidents ==
Some past presidents include:

- John Michaels: 1880–1882; 1892–1894
- Maxwell Goldstein: 1882–1885; 1886–1891; 1905–1906
- Lyon Cohen: 1891–1892
- Bernard Goldstein: 1894–1896
- J. Goldstein: 1896–1898
- Michael Hirsch: 1885–1886; 1896–1902; 1908–1910; 1911–1934
- Abraham Michaels: 1902–1905
- Emanuel Blout: 1906–1908
- Jacob Levi: 1910–1911
- David Kirsch: 1934–1936
- A. L. Mailman: 1936–1938
- Jack L. Klein: 1938–1943
- Joel B. Saxe: 1943–1945
- William Gittes: 1945–1947
- Samuel Moskovitch: 1947–1949
- Harry Benjamin: 1949–1951
- Arthur N. Friedman: 1951–1953
- Norman Genser: 1953–1955
- Bernard J. Lande: 1955–1957
- Arthur Pascal: 1957–1959
- Harry Wolfe: 1959–1961
- Saul E. Moskovitch: 1961–1963
- J. B. Becker: 1963–1965
- Phillip Meyerovitch: 1966–1968
- Dr. André Aisenstadt: 1968–1970
- Henry S. Weiser: 1970–1973
- Sidney Schwartz: 1973–1975
- James D. Raymond: 1975–1977
- Manuel Shacter: 1977–1979
- Nicki H. Lang: 1979–1981

== Legacy ==
To support scholarships for Concordia University graduate students, an endowment has been established. Recipients will be "Moses Montefiore Fellows".

A plaque commemorating Moses Montefiore will be attached to the Guy Street building with the inscription:

"In memory of Sir Moses Montefiore for his lifelong philanthropy and service to world Jewry".

== See also ==
- History of the Jews in Canada
