= Sir Moses Montefiore Home =

Jewish Nursing Home in Australia

The Sir Moses Montefiore Jewish Home provides residential elderly care facilities in Hunters Hill and Woollahra with a further facility being constructed in Randwick. The home is named after Sir Moses Haim Montefiore.

The home seeks to enhance the quality of life of the Jewish aged community, by providing an exceptional standard of service and care, and embracing the richness of Jewish culture and tradition.

In 2001, the Hunters Hill Campus located at 120 High Street was officially renamed the Hal Goldstein Campus.

Hunters Hill currently provides care and accommodation for 369 residents in a broad range of care options including low care (Hostel), high care (Nursing Home) and dementia specific care.

Located just a few metres from the home is the route 536 bus stop on the corners of Park Rd and High Street.
