= Janine Puget =

Argentine psychiatrist and psychoanalyst (1926–2020)

- Born: 19 December 1926; Marseille, France
- Died: 5 November 2020 (aged 93); Buenos Aires, Argentina
- Occupations: Psychiatrist; Psychoanalyst

Janine Puget (19 December 1926 – 5 November 2020) was an Argentine psychiatrist and psychoanalyst. She was known for her publications on group psychoanalysis.

== Biography ==
Puget was born in Marseille in 1926 and moved to Argentina in the 1930s. She trained in psychoanalysis with the Argentinian Psychoanalytic Association and began her medical studies in 1952. She contributed greatly to the fields of trauma situations and family psychotherapies. She taught in Europe and Latin America and was a member of the Buenos Aires Psychoanalytic Association and the International Psychoanalytical Association. She co-founded the Asociación de Psicología y Psicoterapia de Grupo.

In 2011, Puget received the Mary S. Sigourney Award from the International Psychoanalytical Association.

Janine Puget died in Buenos Aires on 5 November 2020 at the age of 93.

== Publications ==
- Violence d'état et psychanalyse (1989)
- Lo Vincular- Teoría y Clínica psicoanalítica (1997)
- Psychanalyse du lien : Dans différents dispositifs thérapeutiques (2008)
