= Eliezer Levi Montefiore =

Businessmen, art enthusiast and gallery director

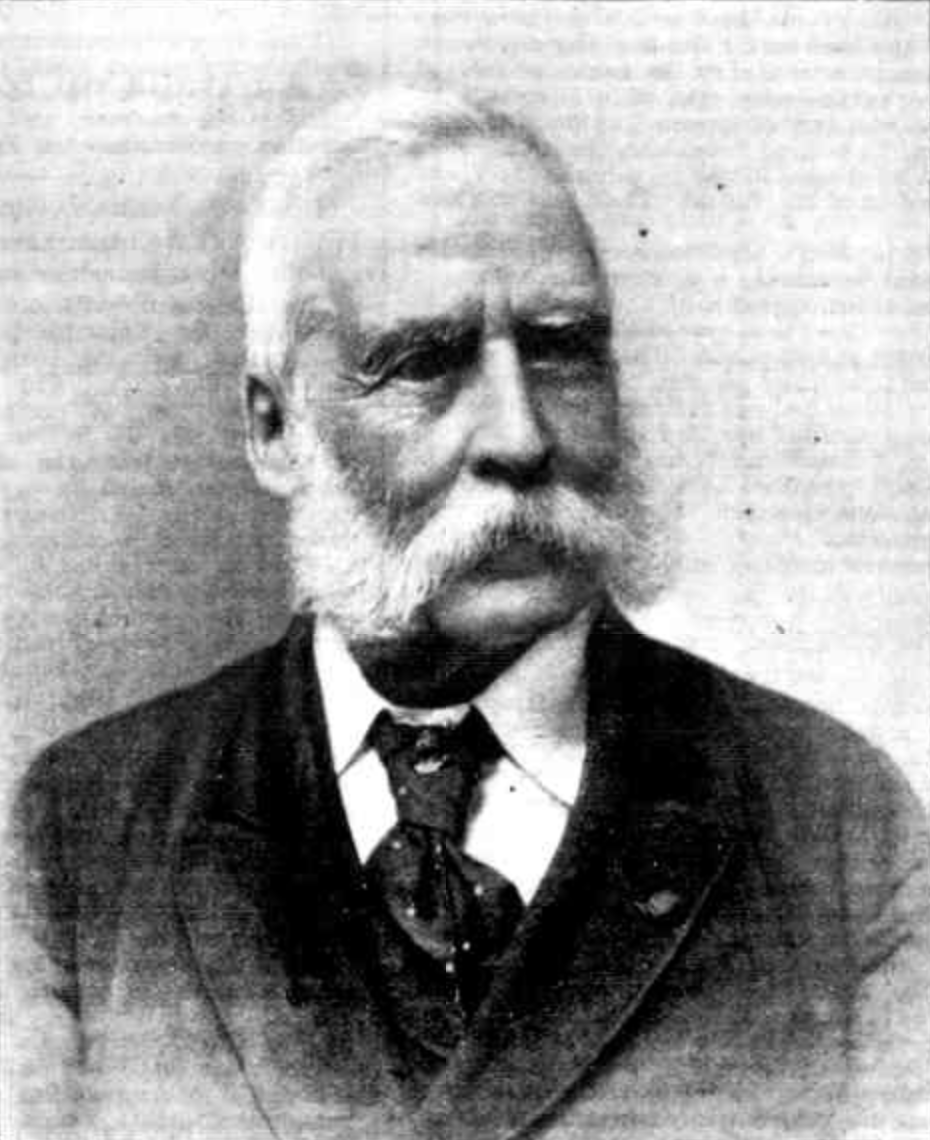
Eliezer Levi Montefiore

Eliezer Levi Montefiore (1820 – 22 October 1894) was a businessman, art enthusiast, and the first director of the Art Gallery of New South Wales.

Montefiore was born in Barbados to merchant Isaac Jacob Levi (who also had a home in Brussels) and his wife Esther Hannah Montefiore, who was first cousin to Sir Moses Montefiore. His elder brother was Jacob Levi Montefiore, who was for some years a member of the New South Wales Legislative Council. Both brothers adopted the name "Levi Montefiore".

Montefiore, who was known for his passion for art, arrived in Adelaide by 1843, and married his cousin Esther Hannah Barrow Montefiore (Joseph Barrow Montefiore's daughter) there on 3 May 1848. The couple moved to Melbourne in 1853, after Eliezer had been appointed manager of the Melbourne branch of his brother Jacob's firm, Montefiore, Graham & Co. He left the firm to become secretary of the Australasian Insurance Co., and was appointed justice of the peace, but his interests lay in literature and the arts. He co-founded the Victorian Academy of Arts in 1870, awarding prizes at the Sydney Intercolonial Exhibition for the Academy.

Montefiore was also a talented artist in his own right, publishing sketches and etchings. He was elected to the Royal Society of New South Wales in 1875.

After moving to Sydney, he was involved in the founding of the New South Wales Academy of Art (later the Art Gallery of New South Wales) along with his friend Thomas Sutcliffe Mort, and was the first director of the gallery from 1892 until his death in 1894.

In August 1894 he travelled to Melbourne and Adelaide to assess artworks for exchange with the NSW Art Gallery. He died at Woollahra on 22 October 1894.

Montefiore Crescent, in the Canberra suburb of Conder, is named in his honour.

Government offices
Preceded by Sir Alfred Stephen	President of the Board of Trustees of the Art Gallery of New South Wales; 1889 – 1892	Succeeded by Frederick Eccleston Du Faur
New title	Director of the Art Gallery of New South Wales; 1892 – 1894	Succeeded by George Edward Layton as Secretary and Superintendent
