= Judith Montefiore =

British travel writer

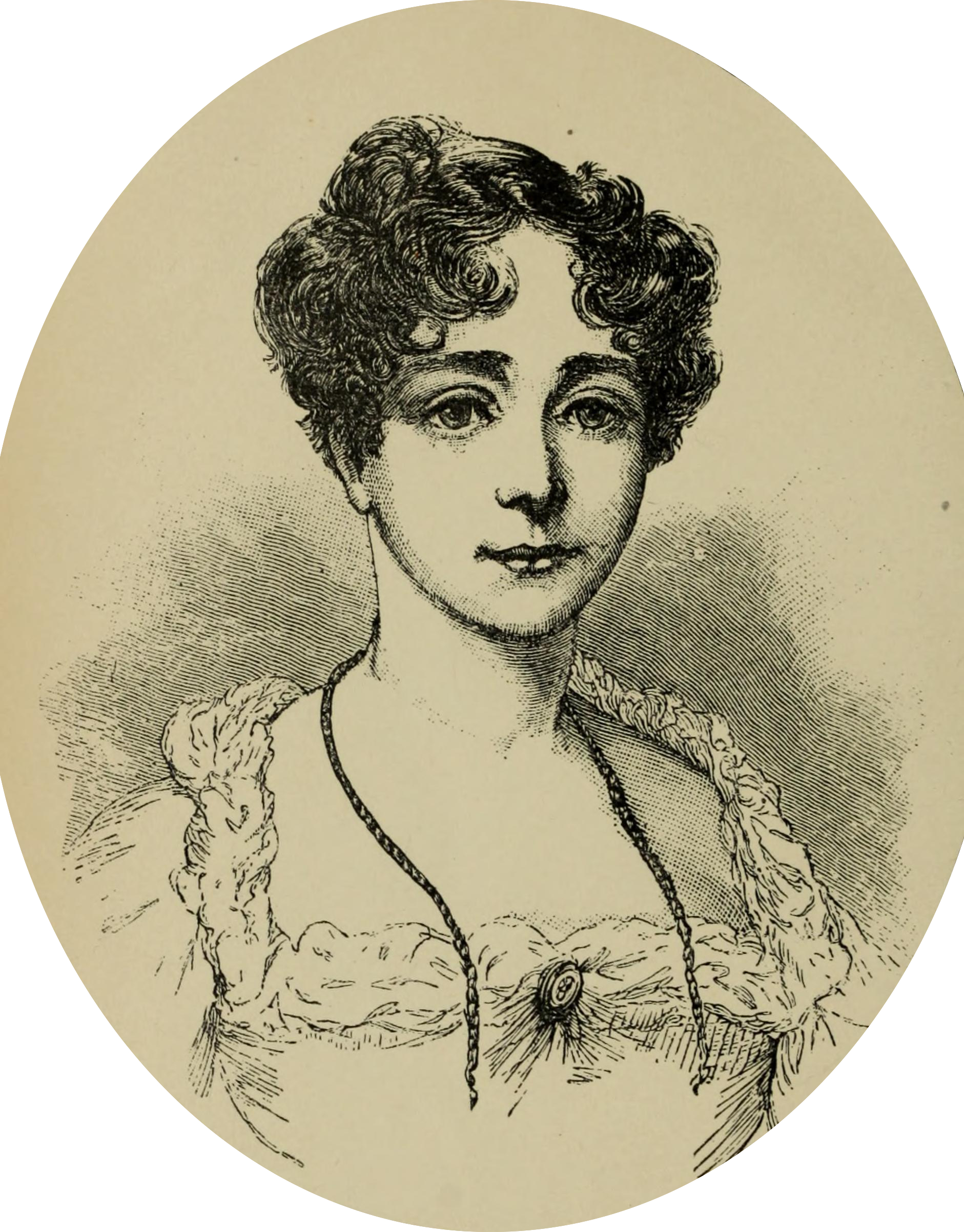
- Born: Judith Barent Cohen; 20 February 1784; London, England
- Died: 24 September 1862 (aged 78)
- Resting place: Montefiore Mausoleum, Ramsgate, Thanet District, Kent, England
- Occupations: Linguist, musician, travel writer
- Spouse: Moses Montefiore (m. 1812)
- Relatives: Levy Barent Cohen; Lydia Diamantschleifer (parents)

Judith, Lady Montefiore (née Barent Cohen; 20 February 1784 – 24 September 1862) was a British linguist, musician, travel writer, and philanthropist. She was the wife of Sir Moses Montefiore. She wrote the first Jewish cook book written in English.

== Early years ==
Judith Barent Cohen, fourth daughter of Levy Barent Cohen and his wife, Lydia Diamantschleifer, was born in London on 20 February 1784. The father, of Angel Court, Throgmorton Street, was a wealthy Ashkenazi Jew.

== Career ==
She married Sir Moses Montefiore on 10 June 1812. Marriages between Sephardim and Ashkenazim were not approved by the Portuguese Synagogue; but Moses believed that this caste prejudice was hurtful to the best interests of Judaism, and was desirous of abolishing it. There is little doubt that that marriage did more than anything else to pave the way for the present union of English Jews. They were married on 10 June 1812, and took a house in New Court, St. Swithin's Lane, next door to one Nathan Maier Rothschild, living there for 13 years. This was likely Nathan Mayer Rothschild, founder of the Rothschild banking family of England, whom one of her sisters, Hannah (1783–1850), had married in 1806.

A keen traveller, she noted the distress and suffering around her, more particularly in the "Jewish Quarters" of the towns through which she passed, and was ever ready with some plan of alleviation. Her privately printed journals, threw light upon her character, and showed her to be cultured, imbued with a strong religious spirit, true to the teachings and observances of the Jewish faith, yet exhibiting the widest acceptance of those espousing other beliefs. She was quick to resent any indignity or insult that might be offered to her religion or her people.

She wrote the first English language Jewish cookbook, The Jewish Manual, published in 1846.

== Later years, death and legacy ==
For some years her health had been so bad that they had spent much of their time in Europe in the hope of improving it, but she had at last become too weak to undertake the journeys, and her last years of her life were spent alternately in London and Ramsgate. Only a few months prior to her decease, the couple had celebrated their golden wedding anniversary, and this period was marked by what seemed a partial restoration of her health.

On 24 September 1862, after exchanging blessings with her husband, she died.

After her death, Sir Moses founded in her memory the Judith Lady Montefiore College at Ramsgate.
