= Moses Montefiore =

British financier and Jewish activist (1784–1885)

Sir Moses Montefiore Bt FRS
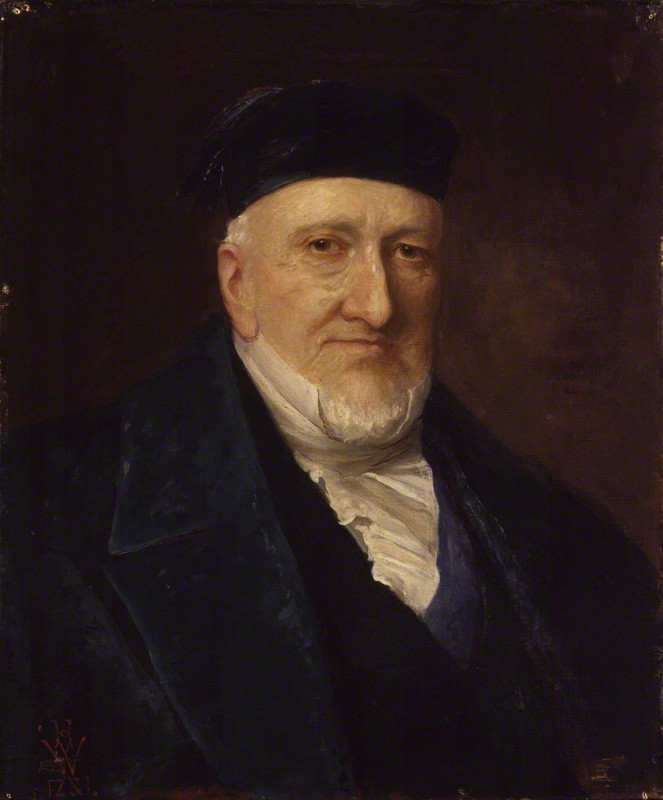
- Portrait, 1881

President of the Board of Deputies of British Jews
- In office 1835–1838
- Preceded by: Moses Mocatta
- Succeeded by: David Salmons

Personal details
- Born: 24 October 1784 Livorno, Grand Duchy of Tuscany
- Died: 28 July 1885 (aged 100) Ramsgate, Kent, England
- Spouse: Judith Barent Cohen (m. 1812; died 1862)
- Parent(s): Joseph Elias Montefiore; Rachel Mocatta
- Relatives: Abraham Mocatta (maternal grandfather); Joshua Montefiore (paternal uncle); Levy Barent Cohen (father-in-law)
- Occupation: Banker
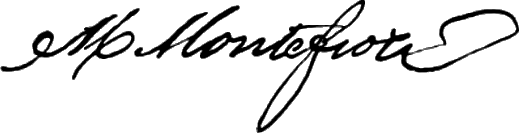
- Signature

Sir Moses Haim Montefiore, 1st Baronet, FRS (24 October 1784 – 28 July 1885) was a British financier and banker, activist, philanthropist and Sheriff of London. Born to an Italian Sephardic Jewish family based in London, after he achieved success he donated large sums of money to promote industry, business, economic development, education and health among the Jewish community in the Levant. He founded Mishkenot Sha'ananim in 1860, the first Jewish settlement outside the Old City of Jerusalem.

As President of the Board of Deputies of British Jews he corresponded with Charles Henry Churchill, the British consul in Damascus, in 1841–42; his contributions are seen as pivotal to the development of Proto-Zionism. Queen Victoria's chaplain, Norman Macleod said of Montefiore: "No man living has done so much for his brethren in Palestine as Sir Moses Montefiore". He stated in an interview in the 1860s that "Palestine must belong to the Jews".

== Early life and family ==
Moses Montefiore was born in Leghorn (Livorno in Italian), Tuscany, in 1784, to a Sephardic Jewish family based in Great Britain. His grandfather, Moses Vital (Haim) Montefiore, had emigrated from Livorno to London in the 1740s, but retained close contact with the town. It was known for making straw bonnets. Montefiore was born while his parents, Joseph Elias Montefiore and his young wife Rachel, the daughter of Abraham Mocatta, a powerful bullion broker in London, were in the town on a business journey. Moses was close to his aunt, Selina Hannah Laurence (née Montefiore 1768–1838); a visit to her in 1829 prompted his recollection of the death of his beloved grandmother Esther Hannah Montefiore (1733 – c. 1812). Selina lived at Bury Court, St Mary Axe, London, and had anglicised the surname of her husband Zaccaria Levy (1751–1828) to Laurence following his death.

== Career ==
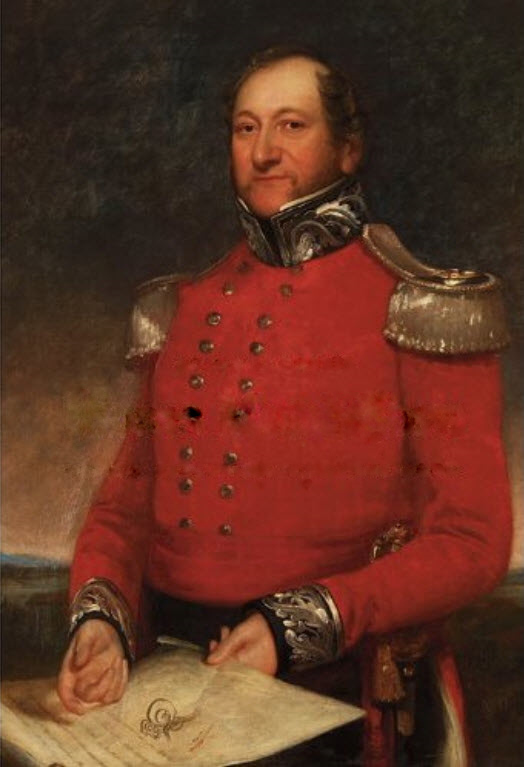
Portrait of Montefiore made after he was made an honorary British Army colonel in 1846

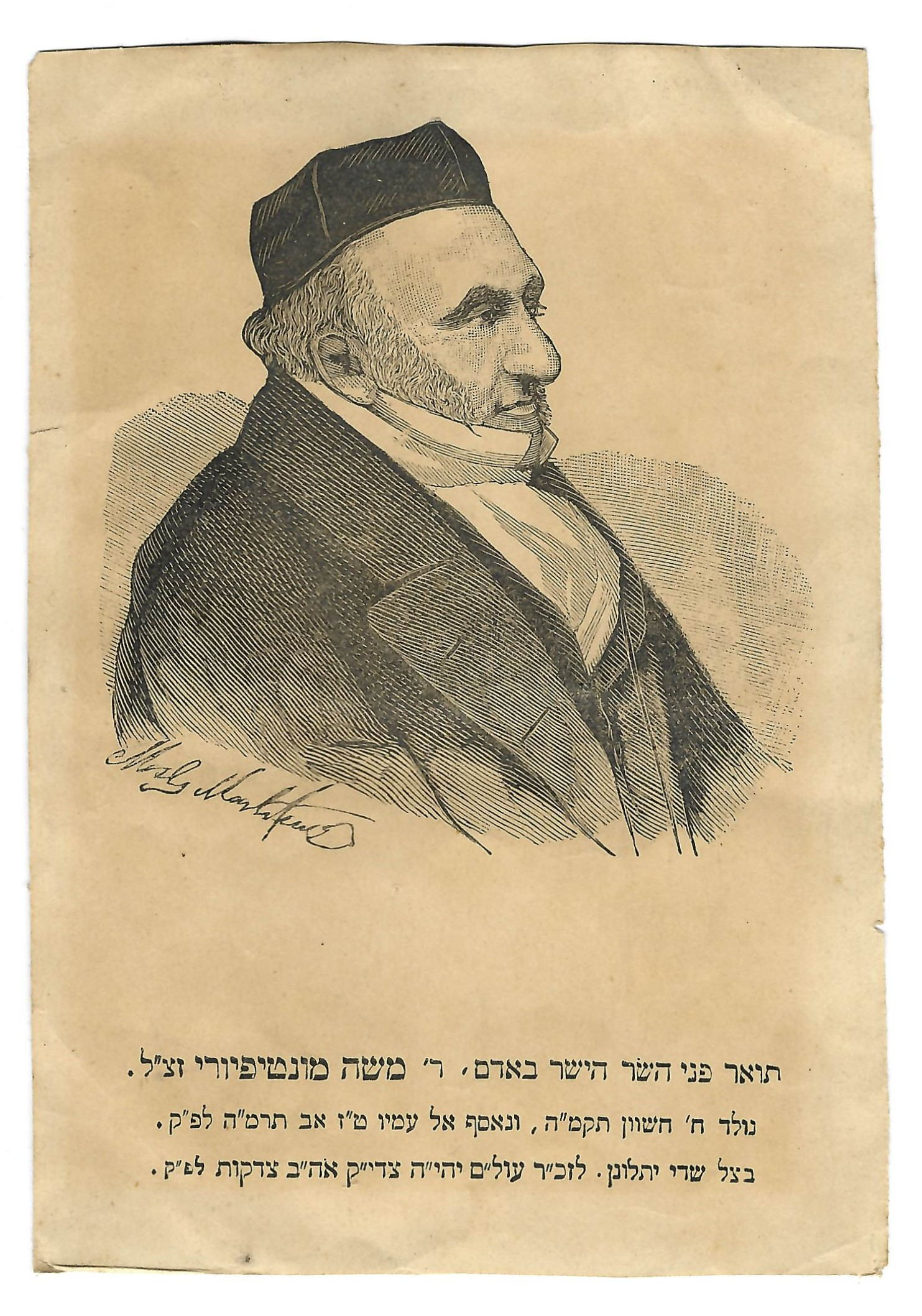
Collotype of Moses Montefiore, c. 1885–1900, in the collection of the Jewish Museum of Switzerland.

The family returned to Kennington in London, where Montefiore attended school. His family's precarious financial situation prevented Montefiore from completing his schooling and he went out to work to help support the family. After working for a wholesale tea merchant and grocer, he was hired by a counting house in the City of London. In 1803 he entered the London Stock Exchange, but lost all of his clients' money in 1806 in a fraud perpetrated by Joseph Elkin Daniels. As a result, he probably had to sell or give up his broker's licence.

In 1812, Montefiore became a freemason, joining the Moira Lodge, No. 92 of the Premier Grand Lodge of England in London. From 1809 to 1814, Montefiore served in the Surrey Local Militia, rising to the rank of captain in the 3rd Surrey Local Militia's 7th Company. There was nothing unusual about Montefiore's militia career, and though not seeing active military service he did learn how to play the bugle. Montefiore was greatly disappointed when his company voted to disband on 22 February 1814. In 1815, he again bought a broker's licence, and briefly operated a joint venture with his brother Abraham until 1816. He largely closed down his trading activities in 1820.

=== Marriage and Baron Nathan Mayer Rothschild ===
In 1812, Moses Montefiore married Judith Cohen (1784–1862), daughter of Levy Barent Cohen. Her sister, Henriette (or Hannah) (1783–1850), married Nathan Mayer Rothschild (1777–1836), for whom Montefiore's firm acted as stockbrokers. Nathan Rothschild headed the family's banking business in Britain, and the two brothers-in-law became business partners. In business, Montefiore was an innovator, investing in the supply of piped gas for street lighting to European cities via the Imperial Continental Gas Association. In 1824 he was among the founding consortium of the Alliance Assurance Company (which later merged with Sun Insurance to form Sun Alliance).

Though somewhat lax in religious observance in his early life, after his visit to the Holy Land in 1827, Montefiore became a strictly observant Jew. He traveled with a personal shohet (ritual slaughterer), to ensure that he would have a ready supply of kosher meat. Although Montefiore spent only a few days in Jerusalem, the 1827 visit changed his life. He resolved to increase his religious observance and to attend synagogue on Shabbat, as well as Mondays and Thursdays when the Torah is read. The visit had been a "spiritual transforming event" for him.

In 1831, Montefiore purchased a country estate with twenty-four acres on the East Cliff of the fashionable seaside town of Ramsgate. The property had previously been a country house of Queen Caroline, when she was still Princess of Wales. It was next owned by the Marquess Wellesley, a brother of the Duke of Wellington. Soon afterward, Montefiore purchased the adjoining land and commissioned his cousin, architect David Mocatta, to design a private synagogue, known as the Montefiore Synagogue. It opened with a grand public ceremony in 1833.

Montefiore is mentioned in the personal papers of George Eliot and in James Joyce's novel Ulysses. It is known that he had contacts with Protestant non-conformists and social reformers in Victorian England. He was active in public initiatives aimed at alleviating the persecution of minorities in the Middle East and elsewhere, and he worked closely with organisations that campaigned for the abolition of slavery. A Government loan raised by the Rothschilds and Montefiore in 1835 enabled the British Government to compensate plantation owners under the Slavery Abolition Act 1833 and abolish slavery in the Empire.

In 1836 Montefiore became a governor of Christ's Hospital, the Bluecoat school, after assisting in the case of a distressed man who had appealed to him to help his soon-to-be-widowed wife and son. Montefiore was elected Sheriff of the City of London in 1837. He was knighted in November 1837.

== Retirement ==
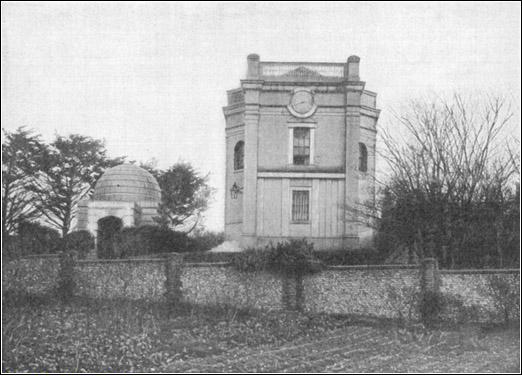
Montefiore synagogue and tomb of Montefiore in Ramsgate, England

After retiring from business, Montefiore devoted the rest of his life to philanthropy. He was president of the Board of Deputies of British Jews from 1835 to 1874, a period of 39 years, the longest tenure ever, and member of Bevis Marks Synagogue. As president, he corresponded with the British consul in Damascus, Charles Henry Churchill, in 1841–42; a practice seen as pivotal to the development of Proto-Zionism.

Montefiore was concerned with alleviating the distress of Jews abroad. He went to the sultan of the Ottoman Empire in 1840 to liberate from prison ten Syrian Jews of Damascus arrested for blood libel in a case known as the Damascus affair; to Rome in 1858 to try to free Jewish youth Edgardo Mortara, who had been seized by the Catholic Church after allegedly being baptised by a Catholic servant; to Russia in 1846 (where he was received by the Tsar) and 1872; to Morocco in 1864 to intercede in an accusation of blood libel in the city of Safi, and to Romania in 1867. These missions made him a folk hero of near mythological proportions among the oppressed Jews of Eastern Europe, North Africa, and the Levant.

Montefiore received a baronetcy in 1846 in recognition of his services to humanitarian causes on behalf of the Jewish people.

== Philanthropy in Ottoman Palestine ==
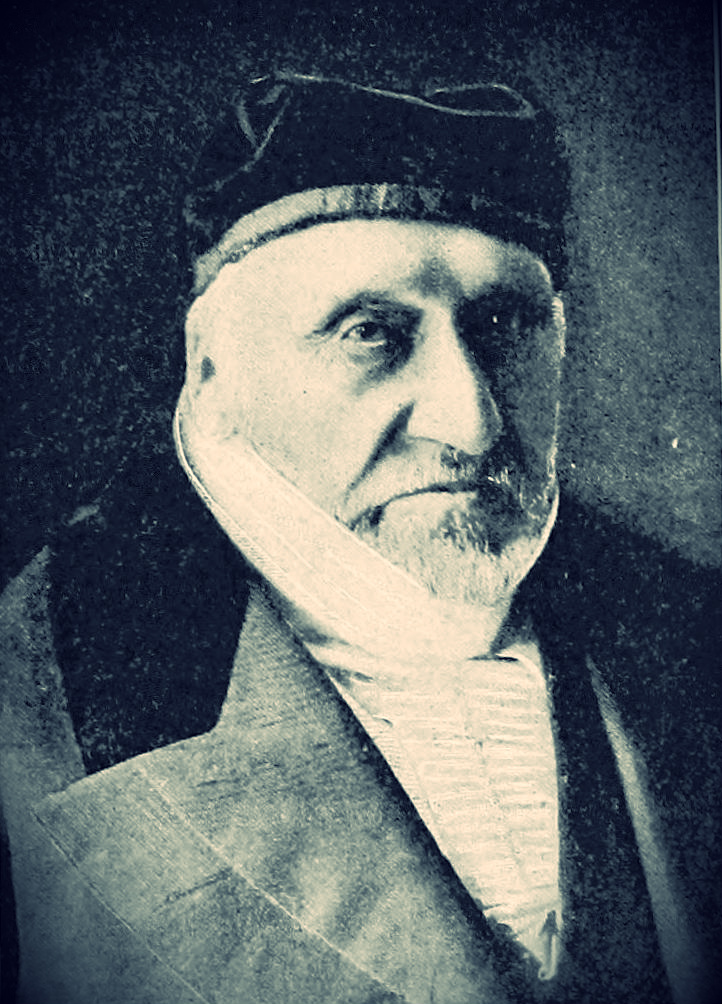
Montefiore on his 100th birthday

He and his wife travelled to Palestine after the region was wracked by an earthquake in 1836. The towns of Safed and Tiberias were particularly damaged, with the few survivors suffering disorder, terror and disease. Moses and Judith launched an ambitious programme of relief in 1837.

In 1854 his American friend Judah Touro, also a Sephardic Jew, died after having bequeathed money to fund Jewish residential settlement in Palestine. Montefiore was appointed executor of his will, and used the funds for a variety of projects to encourage the Jews to engage in productive labor. In 1855, he purchased an orchard on the outskirts of Jaffa that offered agricultural training to the Jews.

In 1860, he built the first Jewish residential settlement and almshouse outside the old walled city of Jerusalem, which today is known as Mishkenot Sha'ananim. This became the first precursor of the New Yishuv. Living outside the city walls was dangerous at the time, due to lawlessness and bandits. Montefiore offered financial inducement to encourage poor families to move there. Montefiore intended Mishkenot Sha’ananim to be a new type of self-sufficient, sanitary settlement where Sephardi and Ashkenazi Jews lived together. Later on, Montefiore established adjacent neighborhoods south of Jaffa Road, the Ohel Moshe neighborhood for Sephardic Jews and the Mazkeret Moshe neighborhood for Ashkenazi Jews, who had distinctly different traditions and languages.

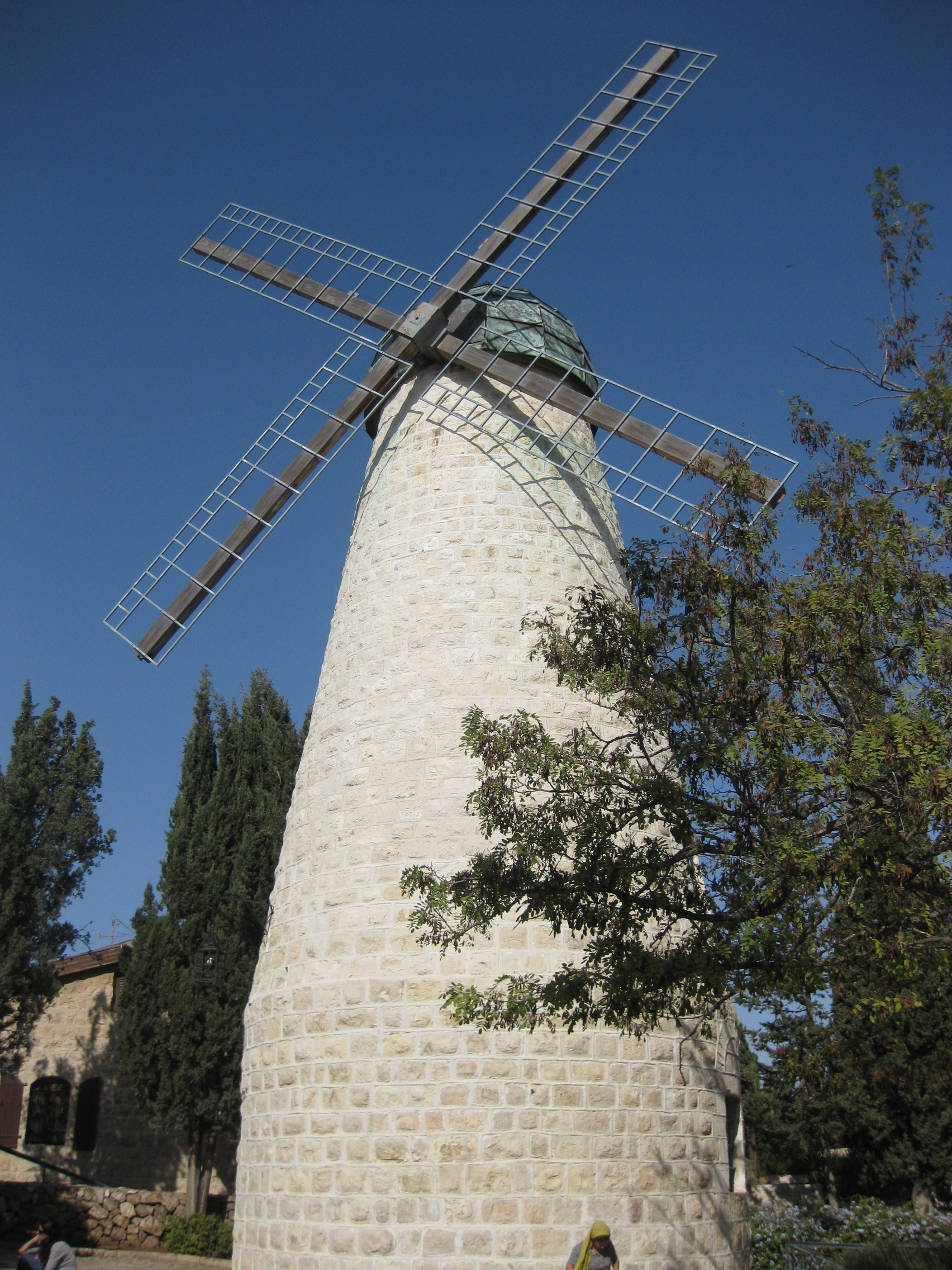
Montefiore Windmill in Mishkenot Sha'ananim

Montefiore donated large sums of money to promote industry, education, and health amongst the Jewish community in Palestine. The project, bearing the hallmarks of nineteenth-century artisanal revival, aimed to promote productive enterprise in the Yishuv. The builders were brought over from England. These activities were part of a broader program to enable the Old Yishuv to become self-supporting in anticipation of the establishment of a Jewish homeland.

Montefiore built the Montefiore Windmill in an area that later developed as the Yemin Moshe neighbourhood, to provide cheap flour to poor Jews. He also established a printing press and textile factory, and helped to finance several Bilu agricultural colonies. The Jews of Old Yishuv referred to their patron as "ha-Sar Montefiore" ('The Minister' or simply 'Minister' Montefiore), a title perpetuated in Hebrew literature and song.

Montefiore commissioned several censuses of the Yishuv, or Jewish community in Palestine: these were conducted in 1839, 1849, 1855, 1866 and 1875, and provided much data about the people. The censuses attempted to list every Jew individually, together with some biographical and social information (such as their family structure, place of origin, and degree of poverty).

== Later life and death ==
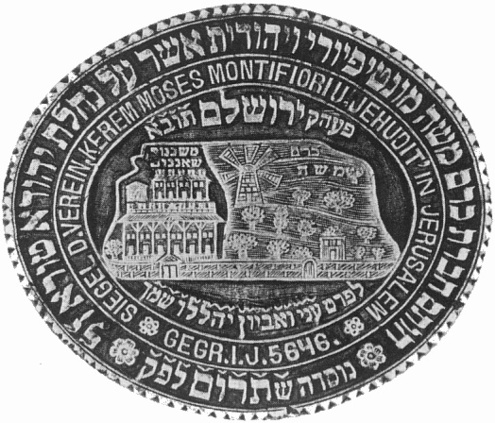
Seal of the "Kerem Moshe Montefiore and Yehudit" Society in Jerusalem ("Vineyard of Moses and Judith Montefiore" Society in Jerusalem); inscribed in Hebrew and German

Montefiore played an important role in Ramsgate affairs, and one of the local council wards bears his name. In 1845 he served as High Sheriff of Kent, and in the next year Montefiore was made an honorary colonel in the British Army. In 1873, the year of his 89th birthday, a local newspaper mistakenly ran his obituary. "Thank God to have been able to hear of the rumour", he wrote to the editor, "and to read an account of the same with my own eyes, without using spectacles."

The town celebrated his 99th and his 100th birthdays in great style, and every local charity (and church) benefited from his philanthropy. At East Cliff Lodge, he established a Sephardic yeshiva (Judith Lady Montefiore College) after the death of his wife in 1862. In the grounds he built the elegant, Regency architecture Montefiore Synagogue and mausoleum modeled on Rachel's Tomb outside Bethlehem. (He also paid for the refurbishment and upkeep of this historic tomb.) Judith was laid to rest there in 1862.

Montefiore died in 1885, at age 100 years and 9 months. He had no children. His principal heir in name, arms and property was his nephew Sir Joseph Sebag-Montefiore (1822–1903, born Joseph Sebag), a British banker, stockbroker and politician.

Sir Joseph's descendant, British historian Simon Sebag Montefiore (born 1965), revealed that his family believes Sir Moses to have fathered a child late in life with a 16-year-old domestic servant. Philanthropist Leonard Montefiore was a great-nephew of Sir Moses Montefiore. Sir Moses Montefiore was buried in the mausoleum which he had had built near the Montefiore Synagogue at Ramsgate.

The estate was sold to the Borough of Ramsgate around 1952, and the Lodge was demolished in 1954. All that remains today is a new building housing a firm of architects. It incorporates parts of the original structure, called the Coach House. There are also some outbuildings that survive (including the Gate House). The Italianate Greenhouse has been restored to its former glory in the early 21st century. The Greenhouse and the rest of the estate are now protected as King George VI Memorial Park. A plaque on the Gate House honors Sir Moses.

== Legacy ==
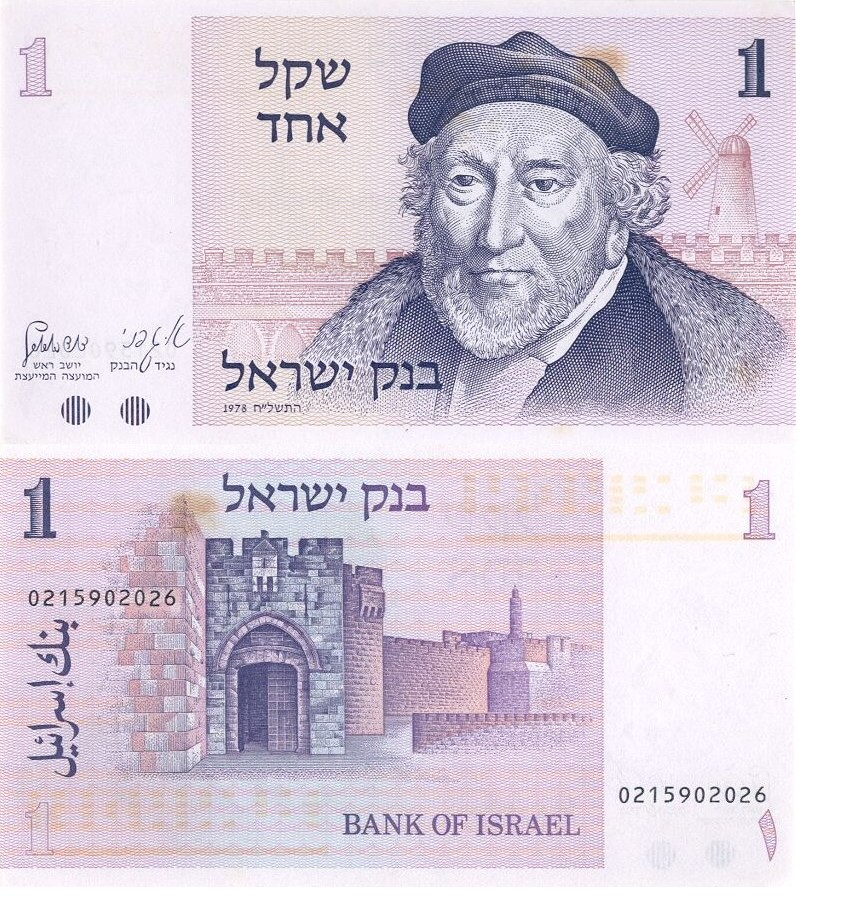
Old Israeli Shekel, 1978

The Montefiore Home for Chronic Invalids in Manhattan and the Montefiore Medical Center in the Bronx are both named after him. Montefiore Square, a small, triangular park in upper Manhattan's Hamilton Heights neighbourhood, is named after Montefiore Medical Center.

A branch of the University of Pittsburgh Medical Center in Pittsburgh, Pennsylvania, also bears his name. Chicago's West Side was home to a special needs public school Moses Montefiore Academy, named in honour of him, until the school's closure in 2016.

A number of synagogues were named in honour of Montefiore, including the 1913 Montefiore Institute, now preserved as the Little Synagogue on the Prairie.

The Montefiore Club was a private social and business association, catering to the Jewish community located in Montreal, Quebec, Canada.

The Montefiore Club was a private social and business association, catering to the Jewish community located in Buffalo, New York from 1969 to 1978.

In Cleveland, Ohio, a Jewish nursing home is called Montefiore.

He was commemorated on two Israeli banknotes. These were the IL10, which was in circulation from 1970 to 1979, and the IS 1, which was legal tender from 1980 to 1986.

The Dolphin's Barn Jewish cemetery in Dublin, Ireland, is dedicated to Montefiore.

== Collections ==
The Montefiore Family Papers were initially deposited in the Montefiore Museum in Judith Lady Montefiore College, Ramsgate, Kent. In 1961 the Montefiore Endowment deposited the papers of Montefiore Family at the Mocatta Library of University College London. The archive spans 24 volumes and 515 items. The papers comprise correspondence, account books, and a private appointment diary. Also included are many testimonials and centenary tributes to Montefiore thanking him for his generosity; these have been digitised.

== Coat of arms ==
Coat of arms of Moses Montefiore
Crest On a wreath of the colours, two mounts as in the arms, therefrom issuant a demi-lion or, supporting a flagstaff proper, thereon hoisted a forked pennant flying towards the sinister azure, inscribed "Jerusalem" in Hebrew characters gold. Escutcheon Argent, a cedar tree between two mounts of flowers proper, on a chief azure, a dagger erect proper, Pommel and hilt or, between two mullets of six points gold. Supporters According to a Royal Warrant, 10 Dec. 1886, to descend with Baronetcy, Dexter, a lion guardant or; sinister, a stag proper attired or, each supporting a flagstaff proper, therefrom flowing a banner to the dexter azure, inscribed "Jerusalem" in Hebrew characters gold. Motto Think and thank. Other elements Mantling of vert and argent.

== See also ==
- History of the Jews in England
- Mazkeret Moshe, Zikhron Moshe, Kiryat Moshe and Yemin Moshe – neighbourhoods in Jerusalem which bear his name
- Montefiore, Tel Aviv – another neighbourhood named after him
- Montefiore Windmill – windmill in Jerusalem, erected due to Montefiore
- Isaac Leib Goldberg (1860–1935) – Zionist leader and philanthropist from Russia
- Maurice de Hirsch (1831–1896) – German Jewish financier and philanthropist, founder of the Jewish Colonization Association
- Edmond James de Rothschild (1845–1934) – French Jewish banker and major donor of the Zionist project

== Bibliography ==
- Goodman, Paul (1925). Moses Montefiore (PDF). The Jewish Publication Society of America.
- Green, Abigail (2010). Moses Montefiore: Jewish Liberator, Imperial Hero. Cambridge, MA: Belknap/Harvard University Press.
- Jaffe, Eliezer David (1988). Yemin Moshe – The Story of a Jerusalem Neighborhood. New York: Praeger and Greenwood Press.
- Kochan, Lionel. "The Life and Times of Sir Moses Montefiore". History Today (Jan. 1973), Vol. 23 Issue 1, pp. 46–52 online.
- Levine, Rabbi Menachem (2018). Sir Moses Montefiore: A Brief History. Aish.com.
- Samet, Moshe (1989). Moses Montefiore - Reality and Myth (in Hebrew). Carmel.
- Wolf, Lucien (1885). Sir Moses Montefiore: a Centennial Biography. Harpers Brothers.

Baronetage of the United Kingdom
New creation	Baronet (of East Cliff Lodge); 1846–1885	Extinct
