= Mount Hope =

Mount Hope may refer to:

== Antarctica ==
- Mount Hope (Ross Dependency), a hill at the foot of the Beardmore Glacier, Ross Ice Shelf
- Mount Hope (Palmer Land), a mountain in the Eternity Range, Palmer Land

== Australia ==
- Mount Hope, New South Wales, a settlement in western New South Wales
- Mount Hope, South Australia, a locality on the Eyre Peninsula, South Australia
- Mount Hope (Victoria), a granite outcrop in northern Victoria
- Mount Hope, Queensland, a mining lease near Mount Isa

== Canada ==
- Mount Hope, Ontario
- Mount Hope, a community of Arran–Elderslie, Bruce County, Ontario
- Rural Municipality of Mount Hope No. 279, Saskatchewan
- Hope Mountain (British Columbia)

== New Zealand ==
- Mount Hope (New Zealand), a peak in the Two Thumb Range in the Canterbury Region

== Ottoman Empire ==
- Mount Hope, Jaffa, a depopulated American farm

== Trinidad and Tobago ==
- Mount Hope, Trinidad and Tobago, birthplace of Hector Sam

== United States ==
- Mount Hope, Lawrence County, Alabama
- Mount Hope, Walker County, Alabama
- Mount Hope (Alaska), a mountain peak of Alaska
- Mount Hope, San Diego, a neighborhood of San Diego, California
- Mount Hope (Colorado), one of the Collegiate Peaks in Colorado
- Mount Hope (Cheverly, Maryland), a house
- Mount Hope (Hazlehurst, Mississippi), a National Register of Historic Places listing in Copiah County, Mississippi
- Mount Hope, Kansas, a city in Sedgwick County, Kansas
- Mount Hope Plantation House, Baton Rouge, Louisiana
- Mount Hope (MBTA station), a station in Boston, Massachusetts
- Mount Hope, Missouri, an unincorporated community
- Mount Hope (Nevada), a summit in Nevada
- Mount Hope, New Jersey, a section of Rockaway Township, New Jersey
- Mount Hope, New York, a town in Orange County, New York
- Mount Hope, Ohio, an unincorporated community in Holmes County
- Mount Hope, Licking County, Ohio, a ghost town
- Mount Hope, Pennsylvania, birthplace of Ralph E. Urban
- Mount Hope Estate, a property in Manheim Township, Lancaster County, Pennsylvania
- Mount Hope (Rhode Island), a hill in Bristol, Rhode Island
- Mount Hope Farm, an estate in Bristol, Rhode Island
- Mount Hope, Providence, Rhode Island, a neighborhood in northern Providence, Rhode Island
- Mount Hope (Ridgeway, South Carolina), a property in Fairfield County, South Carolina
- Mount Hope, Tennessee, an unincorporated community in Wayne County, Tennessee
- Mount Hope (Falls Church, Virginia), a property
- Mount Hope (New Baltimore, Virginia), a property in Fauquier County, Virginia
- Mount Hope, West Virginia, a city in Fayette County, West Virginia
  - Mount Hope High School (West Virginia)
  - Mount Hope Historic District
- Mount Hope, Wisconsin, a village in Grant County, Wisconsin
- Mount Hope (town), Wisconsin, a town in Grant County, Wisconsin
- Mount Hope Bay, an estuary in Massachusetts and Rhode Island
- Mount Hope Corners, Wisconsin, an unincorporated community in Brunswick, Eau Claire County, Wisconsin

== See also ==
- Mount Hope Cemetery (disambiguation)
