= Outrages at Jaffa =

1858 attack on Americans in Ottoman Palestine

On January 11, 1858, the Jaffa Colonists – part of the American Agricultural Mission to assist local residents in agricultural endeavors in Ottoman Palestine – were brutally attacked, creating an international incident at the beginnings of U.S. presence in the Levant. The event, known as the Outrages at Jaffa, tested American colonial resolve in the region, as well as the ability of the U.S. Government to protect its citizens in the region.

== Background ==
The beginnings of U.S. presence in the Levant started in 1844, with the appointment of Warder Cresson as Consul at Jerusalem, though by the time he reached the Holy Land, his appointment had been rescinded. In 1855, the American Millerist (later developed into the Adventist Church) Clorinda S. Minor established the Mount Hope Colony near Jaffa. These colonists were motivated by the belief that a prerequisite for the Second Coming of the Messiah was the establishment of Jewish rule in the Holy Land. The American Christians were joined by German colonists as well.

After Clorinda Minor's death, some of the community abandoned the colony. The colonists were continually harassed by the Bedouin and Arab population and suffered from outbreaks of malaria.

== Night of the attack ==
On January 11, 1858, at about 10:00pm, the Dickson homestead was approached by Arab three men, supposedly searching for a stray cow. Walter Dickson and his son-in-law, Frederick Steinbeck, informed the men that the cow was not on their property. Within an hour, the men had returned demanding to be let onto the premises, bringing with them an additional two men. Walter Dickson fired a warning shot, and retired to bed. Within minutes, the Dickson's dogs were barking in alarm. The gate to the homestead had been broken down. Frederick and Walter approached the men, Frederick addressing them in Arabic. One of the men shot Frederick, and Walter and Frederick retreated into the home, barricading the entrance. The men pried the door up from the bottom, breaking in, beat Walter Dickson into submission, and began to plunder the home. Frederick Steinbeck, suffering of his gunshot wounds, remained immobile, and shortly died from his wounds. Mrs. Mary Steinbeck - Walter Dickson's daughter - caught hold of her father as the men tried to drag her away. They beat her into submission with their guns and four men took her out into the yard, raping her in turn. Mrs. Sarah Dickson was taken into another room and raped. It was near daylight before the men departed. Also present in the home were Mary Steinbeck's two children and 11-year-old Caroline Dickson, daughter of Walter and Sarah Dickson.

== Aftermath ==
After learning of the attack, American Consul John Warren Gorham met with the Prussian Consul at Jerusalem, Georg Rosen, and they approached the Pasha of Jerusalem about the incident, recruiting him in pressuring the local authorities in Jaffa to seek justice against the perpetrators. Copycat attacks upon Americans elsewhere in Ottoman Syria were reported shortly after the incident.

For the next month, J. Warren Gorham shuttled between Ottoman authorities, trying to attain justice for the Dickson family, and ensure the criminals were caught and prosecuted; performed general damage control to the perception of American strength and influence in the region; and attempted to ensure other Americans in the region of their safety. The incident reached the desk of Mehmed Emin Âli Pasha, the Foreign Minister of the Ottoman Empire. Of note is Gorham's mention of perceived indifference, apathy, and laziness of the local authorities to the event, and their ignorance of U.S. power and influence. Edwin de Leon, U.S. Consul General to Egypt, worked in tandem with Gorham to force Ottoman officials to bring the criminals to justice. He perceived that in the region might makes right and recorded that even threats of use of a "squadron" were employed to convince the local authorities to take action. He had also urged that an American warship be dispatched to the coast. After two and a half months, five men were arrested, the U.S. demanding their execution.

The trial was held in Beirut, but soon halted due to uncertainty over the guilt of some of the arrested men. After an inquiry in Jaffa, three of them were released and others arrested. In September 1858, four men were found guilty of murder in the second degree and sentenced to life imprisonment. The fifth man, who had actually fired the shot that killed Frederick Steinbeck, was never apprehended.

== In popular culture ==
Dickson's Palestine Museum

Upon his return to the United States, Henry Dickson - the son of Walter Dickson - created an exhibit where he lectured on his experiences in the Holy Land, and displayed various items he brought back with him. He gave his lectures dressed in Arab garb, and spoke on various topics including local customs, food, animal life, daily life, the treatment of women, and the suffering his family experienced.

Clarel: A Poem and Pilgrimage in the Holy Land

Herman Melville visited the Levant in 1857. While he was there, he spent time at the Dickson homestead. Melville used the experience of the Dicksons as the model for a character's death in Clarel.

East of Eden

Mary Dickson was the great-aunt of famous American novelist, John Steinbeck. Steinbeck was pained when he discovered what his family had suffered in the Outrages, and hinted to it in his novel East of Eden. While on a trip to Israel in 1966, Steinbeck visited the site near Jaffa where the Dicksons and Steinbecks had lived.
