= Montefiore, Tel Aviv =

Neighborhood in Tel Aviv, Israel

Coordinates: 32°4′8″N 34°47′22″E

Montefiore מונטיפיורי
- Neighborhood of Tel Aviv
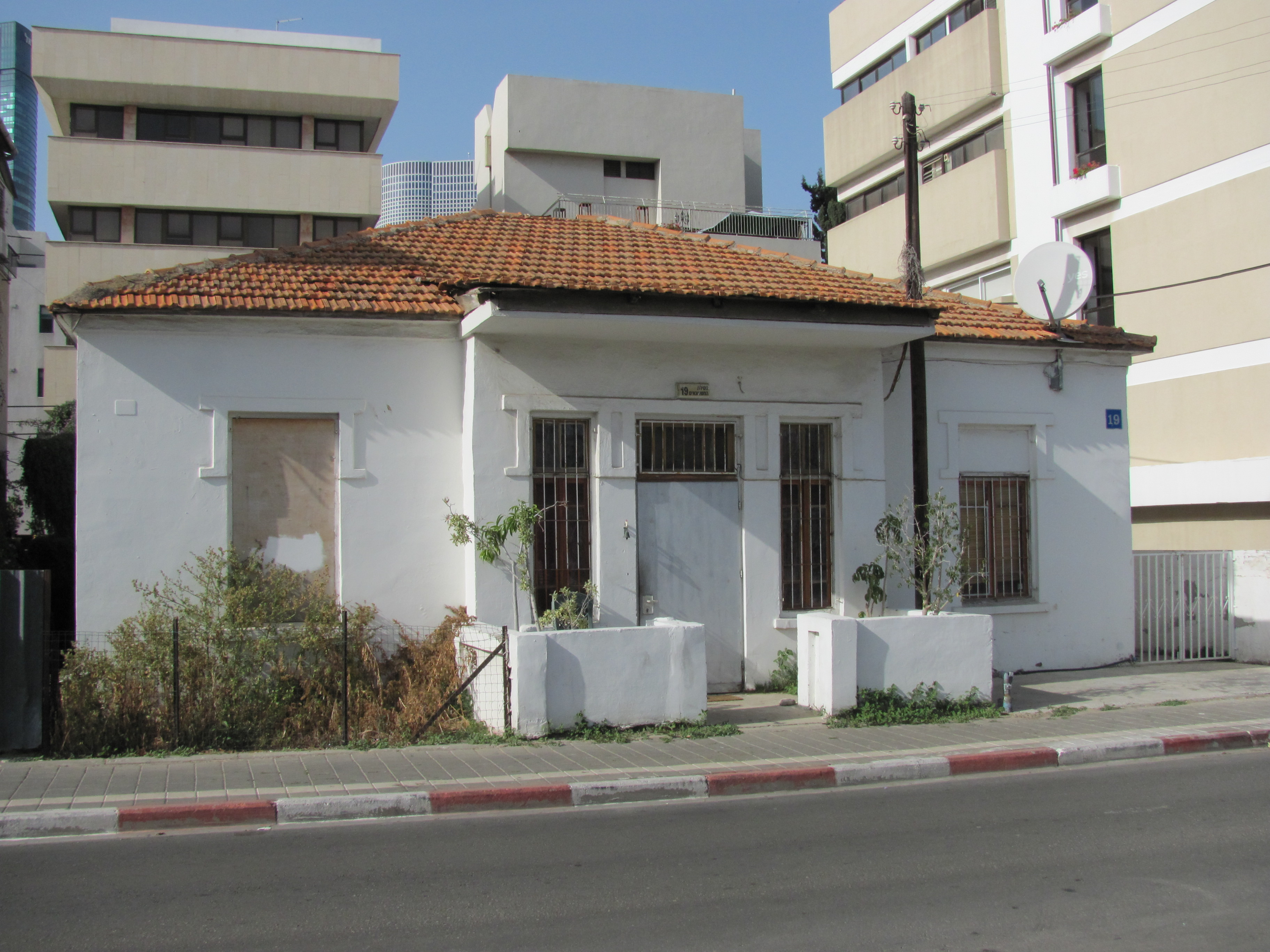
- An old residential house in the neighborhood
- Interactive map of Montefiore
- Country: Israel
- City: Tel Aviv
- Established: 1855

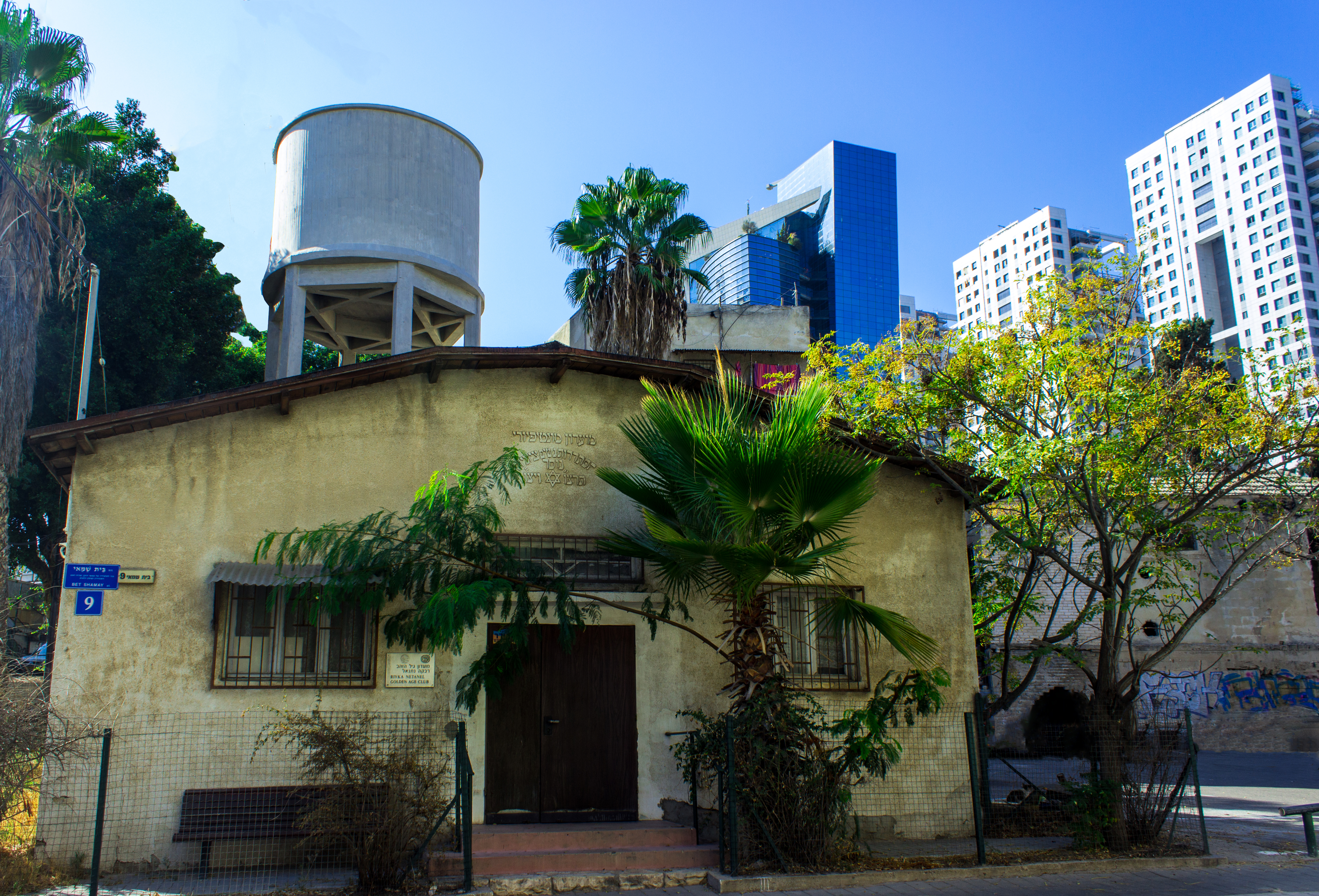
Home and water tower in Montefiore

Montefiore (Hebrew: מונטיפיורי) is a neighborhood in the center of Tel Aviv, Israel.

== History ==
The Montefiore neighbourhood was built on the site of Har Hatikva (Mount Hope, Jaffa) the first community outside Jaffa, established by messianic Christians. In 1855, on his fourth visit to Israel, Moses Montefiore purchased land for the group and appointed Clorinda Minor head of the orchard. In January 1858, the farm was ransacked by Arab villagers, who murdered the head of the family and raped the women.

The Montefiore neighborhood is located on the eastern edge of central Tel Aviv, about 2 kilometers from the Mediterranean coast, at an altitude of about 20 meters. At its eastern border, the Ayalon Motorway (Highway 20) passes along the railway line (on which the Ha-Shalom railway station is located) and the Ayalon River.

== See also ==
- Neighborhoods of Tel Aviv
