= Timeline of United States diplomatic history =

The diplomatic history of the United States oscillated among three positions: isolation from diplomatic entanglements of other (typically European) nations (but with economic connections to the world); alliances with European and other military partners; and unilateralism, or operating on its own sovereign policy decisions. The US always was large in terms of area, but its population was small, only 4 million in 1790. Population growth was rapid, reaching 7.2 million in 1810, 32 million in 1860, 76 million in 1900, 132 million in 1940, and 316 million in 2013. Economic growth in terms of overall GDP was even faster. However, the nation's military strength was quite limited in peacetime before 1940.

== 17th century ==
- 1689–1697 — King William's War against France and French Canada.
- 1690 — Massachusetts troops capture French fortress of Port Royal
- 1697 — Peace of Ryswick ends the war; captured territories restored.

== 18th century ==
- 1702–1713 – Queen Anne's War against France, Spain and its colonies. Indian allies of the French raided New England villages. South Carolina forces raided Spanish Florida.
- 1713 – Treaty of Utrecht ends the war; Britain keeps Newfoundland and Acadia from France.
- 1715–1728 – Yamasee War against Yamasee tribe in South Carolina and its allies.
- 1721 – Treaty with South Carolina established with the Cherokee and the Province of South Carolina which ceded land between the Santee, Saluda, and Edisto Rivers to the Province of South Carolina.
- 1727 – Treaty of Nikwasi established a trade agreement between the Cherokee and the Province of North Carolina.
- 1739–1742 – War of Jenkins' Ear against Spain.
- 1740–1748 – King George's War with France.
- 1754–1763 – French and Indian War with France; major British victory and they keep French Canada. American colonists played a major role but were not given any of the spoils.
- 1754 – Benjamin Franklin proposes the Albany Plan of Union, which would establish a federal government for eleven of the colonies in British North America to adjudicate colonial territorial disputes and diplomatic policy towards Native Americans; it is rejected by most of the colonial governments and never goes into effect.
- 1761 – Treaty of Long-Island-on-the-Holston established with the Cherokee and the Colony of Virginia which ended the Anglo-Cherokee war with the colony.
- 1762 – Treaty of Charlestown established with the Cherokee and the Province of South Carolina which ended the Anglo-Cherokee war with the colony.
- 1763 – Pontiac's War British war with western Indians.
- 1774 – The Thirteen Colonies convene the First Continental Congress and adopt a boycott of British goods and embargo on American exports in protest of the Intolerable Acts.
- 1775 – Regular troops of the British Army and minutemen of colonial militias exchange fire at the Battles of Lexington and Concord, beginning the American Revolutionary War.
- 1775 – The Second Continental Congress sends the Olive Branch Petition to King George III pleading their loyalty to the British Crown; it is ignored and the King issues the Proclamation of Rebellion.
- 1776 – Thirteen United Colonies declared independence as the United States of America on July 2; Declaration of Independence adopted on July 4
- 1776 – Three commissioners sent to Europe to negotiate treaties. Britain bans trade with the Thirteen Colonies, and the Second Continental Congress responds by opening American ports to all foreign vessels except from Great Britain. The Second Continental Congress also adopts the Model Treaty as a template for any future trade agreements with European countries such as France and Spain.
- 1776 – Treaty of Watertown, the first treaty by the independent United States, is signed establishing a military alliance with the Miꞌkmaq tribe.
- 1777 – European officers join the Continental Army, including Marquis de Lafayette, Johann de Kalb, Friedrich Wilhelm von Steuben, and Tadeusz Kościuszko
- 1777 – Treaty of Dewitt's Corner between the Overhill Cherokee and the State of South Carolina which ceded the lands of the Cherokee Lower Towns in the State of South Carolina, except for a narrow strip of what is now Oconee County.
- 1777 – France decides to recognize America in December after victory at Saratoga, New York
- 1778 – Treaty of Alliance with France. Negotiated by Benjamin Franklin, the US and France agreed to a military alliance; France sends naval and land forces, and much-needed munitions.
- 1778 – Carlisle Peace Commission sent by Great Britain; offers Americans all the terms they sought in 1775, but not independence; rejected.
- 1779 – Spain enters the war as an ally of France (but not of America); John Jay appointed minister to Spain; he obtains money but not recognition.
- 1779 – John Adams sent to Paris, to negotiate peace terms with Great Britain
- 1780 – Russia proclaims "armed neutrality" which helps Allies
- 1780–81 – Russia and Austria propose peace terms; rejected by Adams.
- 1781 – Benjamin Franklin, Henry Laurens and Thomas Jefferson named to assist Adams in peace negotiations; the Congress of the Confederation insists on independence; all else is negotiable

— Robert R. Livingston named first United States Secretary of Foreign Affairs

- 1782 – The Dutch Republic recognizes American independence and signs treaty of commerce and friendship; Dutch bankers loan US$2 million for war supplies
- 1783 – Treaty of Paris with Britain. Ends Revolutionary War; US boundaries confirmed as British North America (Canada) on north, Mississippi River on west, Florida on south. Britain gives Florida to Spain.
- 1783 – A commercial treaty with Sweden
- 1784 – British allow trade with America but forbid some American food exports to West Indies; British exports to America reach £3.7 million, imports only £750,000; imbalance causes shortage of gold in US.

— May 7 Congress votes to begin negotiations with Morocco.
— New York–based merchants open trade with China, followed by Salem, Boston and Philadelphia merchants.
— October 11 Moroccan corsair seizes the American ship Betsey and enslaves the crew; the Moroccans demand that the US pay a ransom to release the crew and a treaty to pay tribute to avoid future such incidents.

- 1784 – Treaty of Fort Stanwix in which the Iroquois Confederacy cedes all lands west of the Niagara River to the United States.
- 1785 – Treaty of Hopewell
- 1785 – Adams appointed first minister to Court of St James's (Great Britain); Jefferson replaces Franklin as minister to France.

— March 11 Congress votes to appropriate $80,000 to pay in tribute to the Barbary states of Morocco, Algiers, Tunis and Tripoli.
— July 9 The Moroccans release the Betsy and her crew.
— July 25 Algerine pirates seizes the American ship Maria off the coast of Portugal; Algiers declares war on the US, and the dey Muhammad V of Algiers demands that the US pay $1 million in tribute to end the war.

- 1785–86 – A commercial treaty with Prussia
- 1786 – March 25 A team of American diplomats arrive in Algiers to begin talks on paying tribute and a ransom to free the enslaved American sailors.

— June 23 Moroccan-American treaty is signed in the US agrees to pay tribute to Morocco in exchange for a promise that Moroccan corsairs will not attack American ships.

- 1789 – Jay–Gardoqui Treaty with Spain, gave Spain exclusive right to navigate Mississippi River for 25 years; not ratified due to western opposition

— March 1 United States Congress succeeds Congress of the Confederation
— July 27 Department of Foreign Affairs signed into law
— September, changed to Department of State; Jefferson appointed; John Jay continues to act as foreign affairs secretary until Jefferson's return from France; from 1789 to 1883. Much of the routine overseas business is the responsibility of navy officers.

- 1789 – Treaty of Fort Harmar
- 1791 – Treaty of Holston
- 1791 – In response to the beginning of the Haitian Revolution, Secretary of State Thomas Jefferson proposes limited aid to help suppress the revolt but also pressures the French government to reach a settlement with the Haitian revolutionaries.
- 1792

— February 22 Congress votes to send another team of diplomats to Algiers to pay a ransom for the enslaved Americans and to negotiate a tribute treaty.

- 1793–1815 – Major worldwide war between Great Britain and France (and their allies); America neutral until 1812 and demands the right to do business with both sides
- 1794 -:— March 20 Congress votes to establish a navy and to spend $1 million building six frigates. Birth of the United States Navy.
- 1794 — The United States expels French Ambassador Edmond-Charles Genêt for his attempts to recruit privateers in violation of U.S. neutrality policy.
- 1795 –

— June 24 Jay Treaty with Britain. Averts war, opens 10 years of peaceful trade with Britain, fails to settle neutrality issues; British eventually evacuate western forts; boundary lines and debts (in both directions) to be settled by arbitration. Barely approved by Senate (1795) after revision; intensely opposed, became major issue in the formation of First Party System.
— September 5 United States signs a treaty agreeing to pay tribute to Algiers in exchange for which the dey Ali Hassan will free the 85 surviving American slaves. The treaty with Algiers is considered a national humiliation.

- 1796 – Treaty of Colerain
- 1796 – Treaty of Madrid established boundaries with the Spanish colonies of Florida and Louisiana and guaranteed navigation rights on the Mississippi River. It becomes law.

— July 11 Algiers frees the 85 American slaves.
— The pasha Yusuf Karamanli of Tripoli, hoping for a similar treaty that Algiers has achieved starts attacking and seizing American ships.
— President George Washington, preparing to leave office and troubled by the French Revolutionary Wars in Europe, issues his famous Farewell Address urging Americans to avoid involvement in foreign wars, beginning a century of isolationism as the predominant foreign policy of the United States.

- 1797 –

— President Adams asks Congress to spend more money on the navy and to arm American merchantmen in response to the Barbary pirate attacks.
— August 28 Treaty of Tripoli; treaty with Barbary state of Tripoli approved unanimously by Senate and signed into law by President John Adams on June 10; states "the Government of the United States of America is not, in any sense, founded on the Christian religion."

- First Treaty of Tellico with the Cherokee Nation
- 1798 – XYZ Affair; humiliation by French diplomats; threat of war with France
- 1798–1800 – Quasi-War; undeclared naval war with France.
- 1800 –

— April Tripoli threatens war if the US does not pay more tribute.
— July The Tripolitan warship Tripolino takes the American merchantman Catherine and enslaves the crew. Much outrage in the US
— September 30 Convention of 1800 (Treaty of Mortefontaine) with France ends the Quasi-War and ends alliance of 1778. The treaty frees up the US Navy for operations against the Barbary pirates.

== 1801 – 1865 ==
- Early 19th century — The Barbary states of Algiers, Morocco, Tripoli, and Tunis require America to pay protection money under the Barbary treaties.
- 1801—

The beginning of the First Barbary War. President Jefferson does not ask Congress for a declaration of war against Tripoli, but instead decides to begin military operations against Tripoli, arguing that the president has the right to begin military operations in self-defense without asking for permission from Congress.

— July 24 An American naval squadron begins the blockade of Tripoli.
— August 1 The U.S.S. Enterprise takes the Tripolitan ship Tripoli.

1802 —

— April 18 Second American naval squadron sent to the Mediterranean.
— June 19 Morocco declares war on the United States.

- 1803 — Louisiana Purchase from France for $15,000,000; financed by sale of American bonds in London, and shipment of gold from London to Paris.

— June 2 Captain David Porter leads raid into Tripoli; first American amphibious landing in the Old World.

- 1805

— February 23 The American diplomat William Eaton meets with Hamet Karanmanli, the exiled brother of the pasha Yusuf Karamanli of Tripoli in Egypt and agrees that the US will depose Yusuf and put Hamet on the throne; the first American effort at "regime change".
— March 8 A force of American sailors, marines, Tripolian exiles and Egyptian mercenaries under the leadership of Eaton leaves Alexandria with the aim of deposing pasha Yusuf of Tripoli.
— April 28 Eaton's force takes Derna, the road is wide open to Tripoli.
— June 4 Tripoli and the US sign a peace treaty.

- 1806 — Essex Case; British reverse policy and seize American ships trading with French colonies; America responds with Non-Importation Act stopping imports of some items from Great Britain
- 1806 — Napoleon issues Berlin Decree, a paper blockade of Great Britain
- 1806 — diplomats negotiate treaty with Britain to extend the expiring Jay Treaty; rejected by Jefferson and never in effect as relations deteriorate

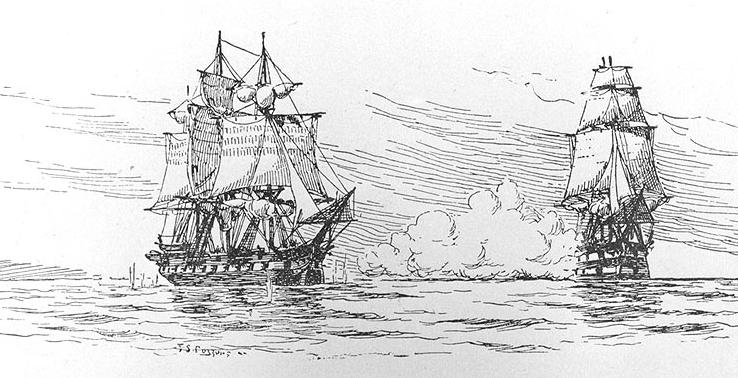
HMS Leopard (right) mauls the USS Chesapeake in 1807

- 1807 — US Navy humiliated by Royal Navy in Chesapeake–Leopard affair; demand for war; Jefferson responds with economic warfare using embargoes
- 1807–09 — Embargo Act, against Great Britain and France during their wars
- 1807–12 — Impressment of 6,000 sailors from American ships with US citizenship into the Royal Navy; Great Britain ignores vehement American protests
- 1812 — America declares war on Great Britain, beginning the War of 1812.
- 1812 — US forces invade Canada to gain a bargaining chip; they are repeatedly repulsed; The US Army at Detroit surrenders without a fight.
- 1813 — US wins control of Lake Erie and Western Ontario; British and Indians defeated and their leader Tecumseh killed; end of Indian threats to American settlements
- 1814 — Treaty of Fort Jackson signals American success in Alabama
- 1814 — British under Major General Robert Ross raid and burn Washington; are repulsed at Baltimore, with Ross killed.
- 1814 — British invasion of northern New York defeated
- 1814 — December 24: Treaty of Ghent signed in Belgium; providing status quo ante bellum (no change in boundaries); Great Britain no longer needs impressment and stops.
- 1815 — British invasion army decisively defeated at the Battle of New Orleans

— Treaty of Ghent is ratified by both sides and goes in effect in February; opens long era of friendly trade and peaceful settlement of boundary issues.
— March 2 The US declares war on Algiers. The beginning of the Second Barbary War.
— June 28 Commodore Stephen Decatur arrives off Algiers, after threatening bombardment, the dey agrees to a peace treaty two days later in which he releases the American slaves and agrees to the end of the United States's tributary status.

- 1815 — Treaties of Portage des Sioux
- 1818 — London Convention of 1818, between the US and Great Britain
- 1819 — Adams-Onís Treaty: Spain cedes Florida to America for $5,000,000; America agrees to assume claims against Spain, America gives up claims to Texas.
- 1823 — Monroe Doctrine. British propose America join in stating that European powers will not be permitted further American colonization. President James Monroe states it on December 2 as independent American policy.
- 1826 — Treaty of Mississinewas, US obtains lands in Ohio and Michigan.
- 1832 — First Sumatran expedition, in retaliation for the seizing of American ship Friendship of Salem while engaged in the East Indies pepper trade.
- 1832 — Treaty of Cusseta, US obtains Creek lands in east
- 1832 — Treaty of Tippecanoe US obtains lands in Indiana.
- 1833 — Argentina. US Navy shells the Falkland Islands, at the time under Argentine control, in retaliation for the seizing of American ships fishing in Argentine waters.

— Siam (Thailand), The Roberts Treaty of 1833; stipulates free trade with few limitations, most favored nation status, and relief for US citizens in cases of shipwreck, piracy, or bankruptcy.

- 1837 — Caroline affair; Canadian military enters US territory to burn a ship used by Canadian rebels.
- 1838 — Aroostook War re: Maine-New Brunswick boundary; no combat

— Second Sumatran expedition, in retaliation for the massacre of the crew of an American merchant ship.

- 1842 — Webster-Ashburton Treaty-settles US-Canada border, settling Aroostook War and Caroline affair.
- 1843 — Treaty of Bird's Fort between Texas and local tribes.
- 1844 — Oregon Question; America and Britain at sword's point; "54-40 or fight" is American slogan
- 1844 — Treaty of Wanghia expands trade with China.
- 1845 — Annexation of Republic of Texas; Mexico breaks relations in retaliation
- 1845 — Slidell Mission fails to avert war with Mexico
- 1846 — Oregon crisis ended by compromise that splits the region, with British Columbia to Great Britain, and Washington, Idaho, and Oregon to U.S.
- 1846 — Mexican-American War begins.
- 1848 — Treaty of Guadalupe Hidalgo; settled Mexican-American War, Rio Grande as US border; territory of New Mexico rest of west ceded to America, especially California. US pays Mexico $15,000,000 and assumes $3,250,000 liability against Mexico.
- 1849 — Hawaiian-American Treaty of Friendship, Commerce and Navigation signed with the Kingdom of Hawaii
- 1850 — Clayton-Bulwer Treaty. America and Great Britain agreed that both nations were not to colonize or control any Central American republic, neither nation would seek exclusive control of Isthmian canal, if canal built protected by both nations for neutrality and security. Any canal built open to all nations on equal terms.
- 1853 — Gadsden Purchase: purchase of 30,000 square miles (78,700 km^{2}) in southern Arizona for $10,000,000 for purpose of railroad connections
- 1854 — Kanagawa Treaty; Matthew Perry to Tokyo in 1853; returning 1854 with seven warships; treaty opened two Japanese ports and guaranteeing the safety of shipwrecked American seamen.
- 1856 — Siam (Thailand). Harris Treaty of 1856; adds extraterritoriality status for US citizens to provisions of Roberts Treaty of 1833, and appointment of a US consul (representative).
- 1857 — Nicaragua; US Navy forces the surrender of filibusterer William Walker, who had tried to seize control of the country.
- 1858 — Modern-era Japan. Harris Treaty of 1858.
- 1858 — Yankton Treaty
- 1858 — Outrages at Jaffa resulted in significant US efforts to coordinate with and pressure Ottoman officials, growing US influence and strength in the region.
- 1859 — Pig War: a local confrontation over an island near Vancouver, Canada; the boundary is settled by arbitration; the pig is the only casualty
- 1861–65 — Lincoln threatens war against any country that recognizes the Confederacy; no country does so, but France comes close but will not act unless Britain goes along.
- 1861 — 19 April. President Abraham Lincoln proclaims blockade of Confederate States of America, giving the Confederacy some legitimacy
- 1861 — 13 May. Britain issues a proclamation of neutrality, and recognizes the belligerent rights of the Confederacy. However, it does not recognize the Confederate government.
- 1864–65 — Maximilian Affair: In defiance of the Monroe Doctrine, French Emperor Napoleon III placed Archduke Maximilian on Mexican throne and French army suppresses Mexican resistance. Washington warns France against intervention, with 50,000 combat troops sent to the Mexican border; France withdraws. Mexicans overthrow and execute Maximilian.

== 1865 – 1900 ==
- 1866 – 26 July. Atlantic Cable opens telegraphic link with Europe.
- 1867 – Alaska Purchase: US purchases Alaska from Russia for $7,200,000; most Russians depart except for some church missionaries.
- 1864 – Treaty on Naturalization with North German Confederation marked first recognition by a European power of the right of its subjects to become naturalized US citizens.
- 1868 – Burlingame Treaty established formal friendly relations with China and placed them on most favored nation status, Chinese immigration encouraged; reversed in 1882 Chinese Exclusion Act.
- 1871 – Alabama Claims. During the Civil War, Confederate States of America raider CSS Alabama built in Great Britain caused direct and collateral damage to US ships; US awarded $15,500,000 by international tribunal and issue settled peacefully.
- 1875 – Reciprocity Treaty of 1875 with the Kingdom of Hawaii established free access to American markets for Hawaiian sugar and other products, and also ceded Puʻu Loa, which became Pearl Harbor
- 1891 – Baltimore crisis, minor scuffle with Chile over treatment of sailors.
- 1893 – Hawaii; January 16 to April 1. Local businessmen revolt against Queen Liliuokalani attempt to impose an absolute monarchy. The overthrow the Queen with no violence and proclaim provisional government; US Marines landed to protect American lives; New government and President Harrison agree to annexation but treaty withdrawn (1893) by President Grover Cleveland. The new government declares a Republic of Hawaii.
- 1895 – Venezuela Crisis of 1895 is a dispute with Britain over the boundary of Venezuela and a British colony; it is finally settled by arbitration.
- 1897 – The Olney-Pauncefote Treaty of 1897 is a proposed treaty with Britain in 1897 that required arbitration of major disputes. Despite wide public and elite support, the treaty was rejected by the US Senate, which was jealous of its prerogatives, and never went into effect.
- 1897–98 – American public opinion is outraged by news of Spanish atrocities in Cuba. President McKinley demands reforms.
- 1898 – De Lôme Letter: Spanish minister to Washington writes disparagingly of President McKinley, casting doubt on Spain's promises to reform its role in Cuba

— Spanish–American War; "splendid little war" with American quick victory
— Treaty of Paris; US gains Philippines, Guam and Puerto Rico; pays Spain for claims; Cuba comes under temporary US control
— Hawaii seeks to join US; with votes lacking for 2/3 approval of a treaty on July 7. The Newlands Resolution in Congress annexes the Republic of Hawaii, with full US citizenship for Hawaiian citizens regardless of race

- 1899–1901 – Philippine–American War, commonly known as the "Philippine Insurrection".
- 1899 – Open Door Policy for equal trading rights inside China; accepted by Great Britain, Germany, France, Italy, Russia and Japan
- 1900 – US forces participate in international rescue in Peking, in Boxer Rebellion

== 1901 – 1939 ==
- 1901 – Hay–Pauncefote Treaty. American agreement with Great Britain nullifying Clayton–Bulwer Treaty of 1850; guarantee of open passage for any nation through proposed Panama Canal.
- 1901 – Congress passes Platt Amendment, designed to protect Cuba's independence from foreign intervention. It effectively makes Cuba a US protectorate and allowed for American intervention in Cuban affairs in 1906, 1912, 1917, and 1920. It also permitted Washington to lease Guantanamo Bay Naval Base. Rising Cuban nationalism and widespread criticism led to its abrogation in 1934 by the Ramón Grau administration.
- 1902 – Drago Doctrine. Foreign Minister Luis María Drago of Argentina announced policy that no European power could use force against any American nation to collect debt, supplanted in 1904 by Roosevelt Corollary to Monroe Doctrine.
- 1903 – Big Stick diplomacy: Theodore Roosevelt refers to US policy as "speaking softly and carrying a big stick", applied the same year by assisting Panama's independence movement from Colombia. US forces sought to protect American interests and lives during and following the Panamanian revolution over construction of the Isthmian Canal. US Marines were stationed on the isthmus (1903–1914)
- 1903 – Hay–Bunau-Varilla Treaty with Panama; leased strip of land increased to 10 miles (16 km) wide.
- 1903 – Alaska boundary treaty resolved the Alaska boundary dispute between the United States and Canada in favor of US; Washington and London become more friendly but Canada angry at Britain.
- 1906 – Algeciras Conference. Roosevelt mediated the First Moroccan Crisis between France and Germany, essentially in French favor.
- 1908–09 – America negotiates arbitration treaties with 25 countries (not Germany)
- 1911 – Reciprocity treaty with Canada fails on surge of Canadian nationalism led by Conservative Party.
- 1911–20 – Mexican Revolution; hundreds of thousands of refugees flee to America; President William Howard Taft recognizes Francisco I. Madero's regime; Madero assassinated by Victoriano Huerta, not recognized by America
- 1912–25 – Nicaragua; America controls Nicaraguan affairs through control of tariff revenues under the Bryan–Chamorro Treaty.
- 1912–41 – China. US forces sent to protect American interests in China during chaotic revolution. In 1927, America had 5,670 troops ashore in China (mostly Marines) and 44 small naval vessels in its rivers.
- 1913–15 – Secretary of State William Jennings Bryan negotiates 28 treaties that promised arbitration of disputes before war broke out between the signatory countries and the United States. He made several attempts to negotiate a treaty with Germany, but ultimately was never able to succeed. The agreements, known officially as "Treaties for the Advancement of Peace," set up procedures for conciliation rather than for arbitration.
- 1914 – Veracruz Incident a standoff between America and Huerta; Congress authorizes force at president's discretion; ABC Powers try to mediate; America seizes Veracruz; Huerta breaks diplomatic relations; war seems near
- 1915 – British passenger liner RMS Lusitania torpedoed off Irish coast by German submarine without warning in defiance of international law that requires giving passengers an opportunity to board lifeboats; 1,200 dead include 128 Americans; Theodore Roosevelt demands war with Germany; Woodrow Wilson issues strong protest.
- 1915–34 – Haiti. US forces maintained order and control customs revenue during a period of chronic political instability.
- 1916–24 – Dominican Republic; US naval forces maintained order and control customs revenue during a period of chronic and threatened insurrection.
- 1916 – Pancho Villa raid into New Mexico; the Mexican Punitive Expedition under John J. Pershing chases Villa deep into Mexico; verge of war
- 1917 – Denmark sold the Danish West Indies islands for $25 million to the U.S., which took over the administration on 31 March 1917, renaming the islands the United States Virgin Islands.
- 1917 – Zimmermann Telegram. Germany proposes military alliance between Germany and Mexico against U.S. Publication outrages American opinion; Mexico rejects proposal.

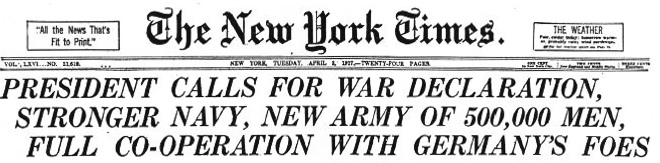
New York Times April 3, 1917

- 1917 – April. America declares war on Germany and later on Austria (but not Ottoman Empire or Bulgaria); remains independent of Great Britain and France and other Allies.
- 1917 – Lansing–Ishii Agreement. America recognizes Japan's claim to special interests in China, particularly in contiguous territory. Objection to Japan assuming Germany's Asian territories.
- 1917 – November—Britain announces the Balfour Declaration which promises a homeland in Palestine to the Jews; it checked with Washington beforehand, and gained Washington's quiet approval
- 1918 – Fourteen Points. Statement of American war aims by Wilson, served as basis for German armistice.
- 1918–20 – Allied intervention in the Russian Civil War sees US troops sent to Siberia
- 1919 – Versailles Treaty – Wilson one of "The Big Four" negotiators; signed by Wilson but not ratified by Senate.
- 1919 – League of Nations – part of Versailles Treaty; US never joins.
- 1922 – Washington Naval Conference held in Washington, D.C. concluding in the Four-Power Treaty, Five-Power Treaty, and Nine-Power Treaty; major naval disarmament
- 1924 – American-led conference results in the Dawes Plan. Eased reparations for Germany and improved its economic situation.
- 1924 – Rogers Act establishes the Foreign Service by merging the low-paid high prestige diplomatic service with the higher paid, middle class consul service. The act provided a merit-based career path, with guaranteed rotations and better pay.
- 1926–33 – Nicaragua; The coup d'état of General Emiliano Chamorro Vargas aroused revolutionary activities leading to the landing of US Marines intermittently until January 3, 1933.
- 1927 – Naval Disarmament Conference in Geneva; failure to reach an agreement.
- 1927 – Clark Memorandum repudiates Roosevelt Corollary to Monroe Doctrine.
- 1928 – Kellogg–Briand Pact, multilateral treaty outlawing war by moral force of 60 signatory nations.
- 1929 – Young Plan reduces amount of reparations due from Germany to $8.0 billion over 58 years.
- 1930 – Smoot–Hawley Tariff Act raised American tariffs on imports; 1000 economists protest it will worsen depression; retaliation by Canada and others.
- 1931 – Stimson Doctrine declared by Secretary of State Henry L. Stimson; Washington will not recognize Japanese takeover of Manchuria.
- 1932 – Lausanne Conference cancels 90 percent of reparations owed by Germany; the remainder was quietly paid off in October 2010 with a final payment of $94 million.
- 1933 – Montevideo Convention. President Franklin D. Roosevelt declares the "Good Neighbor policy", US opposition to armed intervention in inter-American affairs.
- 1933 – London Economic Conference, to deal with Great Depression in the United States, collapses after US withdraws.
- 1933 – US extends diplomatic recognition of the Soviet Union in hopes of expanded trade; trade remains minimal.
- 1935 – Neutrality Act of 1935; when war breaks out prohibits all arms shipments (allowing shipment of oil, steel, chemicals); US citizens can travel on belligerent ships only at their own risk
- 1936 – Neutrality Act of 1936; no loans to belligerents
- 1936 – Spanish Civil War; US neutral; American Catholics support Nationalist forces; left-wing elements support Republican forces
- 1937 – Neutrality Act of 1937; 1935 laws apply to civil wars
- 1937 – Japan invades China, with full-scale war and many atrocities against Chinese; Japan conquers major cities and seacoast; Americans strongly sympathetic to China; Roosevelt does not invoke neutrality laws
- 1938 – Munich Pact sacrifices Czechoslovakia to Nazi Germany in the name of appeasement; US not involved but does not object

== 1939 – 1945 ==
- 1939 – World War II begins, America initially neutral.
- 1940– American intelligence breaks the Japanese diplomatic code with MAGIC.
- 1941 –

— July 29 Japan occupies the southern half of French Indochina, seen as a threatening move.
— July 30 US together with Britain and the Dutch government in exile imposes trade embargo against Japan, most crucially in oil.
— August 13 Atlantic Charter. Anglo-American summit off the coast of Newfoundland. Roosevelt and Winston Churchill agree (1) no territorial gains sought by America or Great Britain, (2) territorial adjustments must conform to people involved, (3) people have right to choose their own govt. (4) trade barriers lowered, (5) there must be disarmament, (6) there must be freedom from want and fear ("Four Freedoms" of FDR), (7) there must be freedom of the seas, (8) there must be an association of nations. Charter is accepted by Allies, who call themselves "the United Nations".
— October 31 American destroyer USS Reuben James sunk by a U-boat. Rise in German-American tensions.
— December 6 American intelligence fails to predict attack on Pearl Harbor.
— December 7 Attack on Pearl Harbor. United States is hit by surprise by Japanese Navy.
— December 11 Germany and Italy declare war on the U.S.

- 1942 -:— August 8 Riegner Telegram received in Washington. Gerhart M. Riegner of the World Jewish Congress has received reliable information that Germany is engaged in a campaign of extermination against the Jews of Europe.
- 1943 –

— January Casablanca Conference. Roosevelt and Churchill meet to plan European strategy. Unconditional surrender of Axis countries demanded, Soviet aid and participation, invasion of Sicily and Italy planned
— October 30 Moscow Declaration. Joint statement by the United States, United Kingdom and the Soviet Union promises that German leaders will be tried for war crimes after the Allied victory.
— November Cairo Conference. Roosevelt, Churchill and Chiang Kai-shek meet to make decisions about postwar Asia: Japan returns all territory, independent Korea.
— November Tehran Conference. Roosevelt and Churchill meet with Stalin.

- 1944 – Monetary and Financial Conference held in July in Bretton Woods, New Hampshire; International Monetary Fund and International Bank for Reconstruction and Development (World Bank) created to aid nations devastated by the war and to stabilize the international monetary system.
- 1944 – Dumbarton Oaks Conference held in August in Washington;
- 1945 – February 4–11 Yalta Conference with Joseph Stalin and Churchill; agreement on division of Eastern Europe
- 1945 – Surrender of Germany (V-E Day)
- 1945 – July 17 – August 2 Potsdam Conference; President Harry S. Truman meets with Stalin and British Prime Minister Clement Attlee; tells Stalin of atomic bomb; gives Japan last warning to surrender; Germany (and Austria) divided into 4 zones of occupation

== 1945 – 2000 ==
- 1945 – US eager to help establish United Nations at San Francisco Conference on International Organization.
- 1945 – June 26 – United Nations Charter signed in San Francisco. America becomes a founding member and has veto power on the Security Council along with Great Britain, France, China and the Soviet Union.
- 1945 – August—Nuclear bombing of Hiroshima and Nagasaki; surrender of Japan (V-J Day); beginning of the nuclear age.
- 1945–1947 – Marshall Mission to China tries and fails to force coalition government of Chiang Kai-shek's Nationalists and Mao Zedong's Communists
- 1945–1953 – U.S. provides grants and credits amounting to $5.9 billion to Asian countries, especially China/Taiwan ($1.051 billion), India ($255 million), Indonesia ($215 million), Japan ($2.44 billion), South Korea ($894 million), Pakistan ($98 million) and the Philippines ($803 million). In addition, another $282 million went to Israel and $196 million to the rest of the Middle East. All this aid was separate from the Marshall Plan.
- 1946 – In the Blum–Byrnes agreement, the US forgives $2.8 billion in French debts (mostly World War I loans), and gives an additional low-interest loan of $650 million. In turn, France allows American films in its cinemas.
- 1947 – Truman Doctrine gives military and economic aid to Greece and Turkey to halt spread of Communism
- 1947–1989 – Cold War, an era of high tension and hostility—but no major "hot" war—between the US and its allies (Western Europe, Canada, Japan, etc.) and the Soviet Union and its satellite states.
- 1947 – General Agreement on Tariffs and Trade (GATT) includes US and 22 nations who agree to eliminate trade barriers of all kinds on industrial and agricultural goods. Replaced in 1995 by World Trade Organization/
- 1948–1951 – Marshall Plan (formally, "European Recovery Plan"); US gives out $13 billion to rebuild and modernize Western European economies. Increased trade between Europe and the America; no repayment asked for.
- 1948

— June 24 Berlin Blockade imposed by the Soviet Union, blocking traffic into western sectors of Berlin, followed by Operation Vittles, America airlifted massive amounts of food, fuel and supplies into city. Soviet blockade lifted on May 12, 1949.

- 1949

— January 21 Dean Acheson appointed Secretary of State. He will hold this office until 1953 and is remembered as one of the more abler Secretaries of State.
— April 4 America and eleven other nations sign the North Atlantic Treaty, creating NATO, a military alliance with the purpose of countering the Soviet Union and its allies.
— 23 May 1949 The United States, Britain and France grant independence in their zones in Germany to a new state called the Federal Republic of Germany.

- 1950–1953

— June 25 Korean War begins. US sends in troops to stop North Korean invasion; UN votes support; (Soviet Union boycotted UN and did not veto.) US forces deployed in Korea exceeded 300,000 during the last year of the conflict.
— September US-led invasion defeats North Korean army; UN authorizes rollback strategy, with North Korea to come under UN control
— November Chinese forces enter North Korea; roll back UN-US-South Korean forces to below 38th parallel

- 1951

— March 28 President Vincent Auriol of France visits Washington to meet President Truman. During his visit, the US agrees to pay for entire French war effort in Vietnam, and to provide unlimited military aid.
— April President Truman fires General Douglas MacArthur as blame game escalates regarding Korean war stalemate.
— June Talks for an armistice in the Korean War open. The major issue that divides the Communist and UN sides is the return of the POWs with the Communists demanding that all POWs from their nations be repatriated while the UN insists on voluntary repatriation.
— September 1 ANZUS Treaty united America, Australia and New Zealand in a defensive regional pact

- 1952 – Dwight D. Eisenhower defeats isolationist element in GOP; denounces stalemate in Korea and promises to go there himself; elected president in landslide
- 1953 –

— May Eisenhower threatens use of nuclear weapons in Korean War; China agrees to negotiate.
— July 27 armistice signed ending the Korean War (it is still in effect).

- 1953 – Iran. US and UK governments support shah's coup against Iran's Prime Minister Mohammad Mosaddegh
- 1954

— March 13 The Battle of Dien Bien Phu begins. As the French are faced with defeat in Vietnam, Eisenhower considers intervention with tactical nuclear weapons to break the siege of Dien Bien Phu, and orders the Joint Chiefs of Staff to start work on Operation Vulture, the plan to intervene in Vietnam. Operation Vulture is ultimately rejected as a policy option.
— April 26 Geneva conference opens. Through called to consider a peace treaty for the Korean War, the conference is soon dominated by the question of Vietnam. The Secretary of State John Foster Dulles heads the American delegation.
— June 18 Guatemala. Dwight D. Eisenhower authorizes Operation PBSuccess, a program of "psychological warfare and political action" against anti-US regime; Guatemalan military overthrows the left-wing government of Jacobo Árbenz and installs Carlos Castillo Armas.
— July 20 The Geneva conference closes with an agreement on the partition of Vietnam into two states with a promise to hold a general election in both by June 1956. Dulles does not sign the Geneva accords, but promises that the US will abide by them.
— September 8 SEATO alliance in Southeast Asia is founded. South Vietnam not a signatory

1955

— February 24 Baghdad Pact is founded. Later known as the Central Treaty Organization (or CENTO) initiated by John Foster Dulles, members were Iran, Iraq, United Kingdom, Pakistan, and Turkey, US aid.
— The annual People's Republic of China-United States Ambassadorial Talks begin.

- 1957 – Eisenhower Doctrine gives the president authority to determine the necessity to assist any nation requesting assistance against armed aggression from any country controlled by international communism, applied in Lebanon the following year.
- 1957 – Americans embarrassed when Soviets launch Sputnik, the first space satellite and leapfrog America in high technology.
- 1958 – US foreign aid appropriation, $3.2 billion for military and economic aid; lending authority of the Export-Import Bank raised to $7 billion; US admits 32,000 Hungarian refugees from 1956 revolt
- 1959 – Cuba. Fidel Castro comes to power. The first of 1 million Cuban exiles go to US, concentrating in Miami
- 1960 – Nikita Khrushchev cancels summit conference with Eisenhower after US U-2 spy plane shot down over the Soviet Union
- 1960 – Act of Bogotá makes social reform a prior condition for American economic aid
- 1960 – Cuba seizes $1.5 billion of American properties; America imposes complete trade embargo (except food, medicine) continues in effect in 2012
- 1961 – President John F. Kennedy launches Space Race, promising Americans on the Moon; they landed July 20, 1969
- 1961 McGeorge Bundy becomes US National Security Advisor.
- 1961 – Cuba. America breaks diplomatic relations as Castro aligns with Soviet Union.
- 1961 – Alliance for Progress. inter-regional agreement funded by America to counter the growing regional appeal of the Cuban Revolution.
- 1961 – Bay of Pigs Invasion in April; CIA-trained Cuban exiles invaded Cuba and were defeated at the Bay of Pigs; captured and ransomed by President Kennedy
- 1961 – Berlin Crisis. Soviets give East Germany control over East Berlin; in August the Berlin Wall is built to stem the wave of refugees escaping to the Western side. Kennedy proclaims "Ich bin ein Berliner" ("I am a citizen of Berlin") to cheering West Berliners.
- 1962 – Organization of American States (OAS) excludes Cuba, sets up trade embargo; dropped in 1975.
- 1962 – Cuban Missile Crisis. John F. Kennedy on October 22 announces that there exist Soviet missiles in Cuba and demanded their removal while imposing an air-sea blockade. Soviet missiles are withdrawn on condition that America will not invade Cuba.
- 1963 – Partial Nuclear Test Ban Treaty. US and the Soviet Union agreed not to conduct nuclear tests in space, in the atmosphere or underwater. Underground tests permitted; signed by 100 nations, excluding France and the People's Republic of China.
- November 1963 – Kennedy Assassinated.
- 1964 – Gulf of Tonkin Resolution gives President Lyndon B. Johnson Congressional approval to act in Vietnam; repealed in 1970.
- 1965 – Intervention in Dominican Republic.
- 1967 – In response to the construction of a Soviet anti-ballistic missile system around Moscow the Glassboro Summit Conference is convened.
- 1968 – Tet Offensive in Vietnam causes political crisis at home.

— November 1 The first "accelerated pacification" of launching land reforms in South Vietnam intended to persuade South Vietnamese peasants not to support the Viet Cong is launched; a success.
— The United States signs the Treaty on the Non-Proliferation of Nuclear Weapons.

- 1969 – Richard Nixon as president and Henry Kissinger as his National Security Advisor; Kissinger serves as Secretary of State 1973–77.

— January 28 Nixon launches policy of Vietnamization, in which American ground troops in Vietnam were to be steadily reduced and the American role was to provide military training, equipment, and air support for the South Vietnamese military. Vietnamization was intended to reduce American losses in Vietnam, and thus reduce the domestic pressure for a total withdrawal of American forces. At the same time Nixon intensified the war by beginning Operation Menu, the secret bombing of Cambodia. Nixon's aim in Vietnam is to force a Korean War-type armistice, which requires that the war go on until Hanoi agreed to the American terms while at the same time forcing Nixon to deflect pressure from domestic anti-war protests. With the same aim of achieving an armistice that would allow South Vietnam to continue to exist, Nixon begins a policy of seeking better relations with the Soviet Union and China, hoping those two states would reduce, if not end their arm supplies to North Vietnam in return for better relations with Washington, and thus forcing Hanoi to accept peace on American terms.
— February Following the success of the first "accelerated pacification" and the Phoenix Program of "neutralizing" (i.e. assassinating) Viet Cong operatives, Nixon applies strong pressure for more "accelerated pacification" campaigns and the Phoenix Program killings in South Vietnam as a part of the effort at breaking the Viet Cong. For Nixon, "accelerated pacification" and the Phoenix Program killings both have the effect of weakening the Viet Cong without the use of American troops, which serves to achieve both his aims of reducing American forces and applying pressure for the Vietnamese Communists to accept peace on American terms.
— March 8 President Nasser of Egypt launches the War of Attrition against Israel. The US supports Israel while the Soviet Union supports Egypt.
— July 25 Nixon announces the Nixon Doctrine in which Nixon warns that the United States will not go to any lengths to defend its allies, especially in Asia, and henceforth American allies must do more for their own defense. The doctrine is especially aimed at South Vietnam and is intended to pressure the South Vietnamese government to do a more effective job of fighting the Communists.
— July Nixon visits Pakistan and meets with the Pakistani President General Agha Yahya Khan, tells him that he wants to use Pakistan as an intermediary for talks with China. Yahya Khan agrees to Nixon's request.
— September 9 Walter Stoessel, the American ambassador to Poland is ordered by Nixon to make contacts with Chinese diplomats in an informal way.
— October 16 Pakistani ambassador to the United States Agha Hilaly tells Kissinger that President Yahya is going to visit China early the next year, and is there any message that Kissinger would like Yahya to pass on to Mao.
— November 3 Nixon gives a TV speech claiming that there was a "silent majority" supporting his Vietnam policies, states that he needs some more time for his policies to work, denounces anti-war protestors as a threat to world peace, and asks for the support of the "silent majority" to help him "to end the war in a way that we could win the peace."
— November 17 The Strategic Arms Limitation Talks begin.

- 1970

— February 23 Hilaly tells Kissinger that after Yahya's visit to Beijing that the Chinese were interested in the American offer, but did not want to negotiate from a position of weakness.
— March Under the "accelerated pacification", more than million hectares of land have been redistributed in American-encouraged land reform in South Vietnam.
— March 7 Chiang Kai-shek who has heard reports of Sino-American talks in Warsaw writes to Nixon to protest.
— April 29 Nixon orders the Cambodian Incursion. American and South Vietnamese force invade eastern provinces of Cambodia with the aim of clearing out the Viet Cong/North Vietnamese forces based there. Sparks much protest in the United States.
— June By this point in the War of Attrition between Israel and Egypt, there are regular clashes occurring between Israel and Soviet forces in Egypt, leading to fears that this might cause a world war, which in turn leads to strong pressure for a ceasefire.
— October 25 During a Pakistani-American summit, President Nixon asks President Yahya to pass on another message to Beijing about the American wish for rapprochement with China.
— October 31 Kissinger meets with Romanian President Nicolae Ceaușescu and asks him to pass on a message to China that the US wishes for a normalization of relations with the People's Republic of China.

- 1971

— January 12 Corneliu Bogdan, the Romanian ambassador to the US tells Kissinger that Ceaușescu has passed on the American message, and that for Mao, normalization would be possible if the US would end the "occupation" of Taiwan as Mao calls American support for Taiwan. This poses a major problem for Nixon as allow China to take Taiwan would greatly damage America's image and pose domestic problems.
— March 4 Nixon gives press conference, and warns that better Sino-American relations cannot come at the expense of Taiwan.
— March 26 Pakistan launches Operation Searchlight intended by President Agha Yahya Khan to crush the Awami League in East Pakistan, and to eliminate the intelligentsia, political class and Hindu minority of East Pakistan. As General Yahya is a key conduit in the talks between the US and China, the Nixon administration does not protest Operation Searchlight as it fears this might offend General Yahya, as part of its marked "tilt" towards Pakistan.
— April 6 The Blood telegram sent by Archer Blood, the American consul in Dhaka and 20 other diplomats protesting the Nixon administration's silence about the Pakistani government's repression in East Pakistan and what the telegram argues is a campaign of genocide by the government against the Hindu minority in East Pakistan. The Blood telegram does not affect American policy towards Pakistan, and effectively cuts the career of Blood and the other diplomats.
— April 14 Ping-pong diplomacy. The American table tennis team is allowed to visit China, causes a sensation. During a phone conversation, Kissinger says "It's a tragedy that it has to happen to Chiang at the end of his life but we have to be cold about it", to which Nixon replies "We have to do what's best for us".
— April 21 Pakistani President Yahya informs Nixon that he had spoken with Zhou Enlai, and that the Chinese wished for a senior American envoy to make a secret visit to Beijing.
— April 27 About the Chinese offer of a secret American envoy to visit Beijing, Kissinger tells Nixon that "If we get this thing working, we will end Vietnam this year."
— July 9 Kissinger visits Islamabad, Pakistan, and from there goes on to a secret trip to Beijing to meet Zhou Enlai and Mao Zedong. During the secret summit in Beijing, it is agreed that President Nixon will visit China the next year.
— December 3 Indo-Pakistani war begins. The US supports Pakistan while the Soviet Union supports India.
— December 11 Nixon orders Task Force 74 to the Bay of Bengal in an attempt to intimidate India into accepting a ceasefire before the Indians defeat Pakistan.
— December 16 The war ends in Pakistan's defeat. Nixon fails in his efforts preserve Pakistan's unity, and East Pakistan secedes as the independent People's Republic of Bangladesh.

- 1972 –

— February 21 Nixon visits China, and at the end of the trip the United States and China issue the Shanghai Communiqué endorsing the One-China policy. Nixon in Beijing opens era of détente with China.
— May 9 Nixon orders Operation Linebacker with the aiming of destroying North Vietnam's logistical capacity.
— May 22 Moscow summit. Nixon in Moscow opens era of détente with Soviet Union; SALT I.
— June 3 Quadripartite Agreement governing the status of Berlin.
— October 8 Kissinger meets with the North Vietnamese negotiator Le Duc Tho in Paris for peace talks to end the Vietnam War, and initially the talks go well.
— October 18 President Nguyen Van Thieu of South Vietnam rejects the proposed Paris peace agreement, complaining that Kissinger had not consulted him.
— December 17 Paris peace talks break down.
— December 18 Nixon orders "Christmas Bombings" against North Vietnam following the breakdown in the Paris peace talks.

- 1973 –

— 27 January Paris Peace Accords ends the American war in Vietnam; POW's returned in March.
— October 6 October War begins with a surprise attack on Israel by Egypt and Syria. The US supports Israel while the Soviet Union supports Egypt and Syria.
— October 12 Nixon orders Operation Nickel Grass, a major American effort to supply Israel with weapons to make good the IDF's heavy initial losses.
— October 20 Arab oil embargo led by King Faisal of Saudi Arabia against the US and other Western nations begins as punishment for support of Israel. The oil embargo sparks major inflation in the United States.
— October 24 The Soviet Union announces that it will send troops to Egypt, which in turn leads Kissinger to warn that the United States will send troops to fight the Soviet forces deployed to Egypt. Nixon places the United States military on DEFCON 3, one of the highest states of alert. The Soviets back down.
— October 25 A ceasefire brokered by the US and the Soviet Union ends the October War.

1974–

— January 18 Under an American disengagement plan negotiated by Kissinger, Israeli forces pull back from the Suez Canal.
— March 17 Arab oil embargo against the West ends.
— November President Gerald Ford and General Secretary Leonid Brezhnev agree to the framework of SALT II at the Vladivostok Summit Meeting on Arms Control.

- 1975 – North Vietnam invades and conquers South Vietnam; over one million refugees eventually come to America.
- 1975 – In response to the Soviet-Cuban sponsored MPLA's successes against the U.S.-sponsored FNLA and UNITA in the Angolan Civil War, the United States urges apartheid-era South Africa to invade Angola to prevent pro-independence militants in South West Africa during the South African Border War from using it as a base.
- 1977–81; Presidency of Jimmy Carter#Africa, especially Andrew Young promotes friendly relations with Black Africa, and pushes back against Southern Rhodesia and especially South Africa.
- 1977 :— June 30 SEATO alliance is dissolved.
- 1978 – Camp David Accords, brokered by President Jimmy Carter, saw Egypt's president Anwar Sadat and Israel's Menachem Begin come to terms, leading to their historic peace treaty in 1979
- 1979 – The US switches diplomatic recognition from the Republic of China (Taiwan) to the People's Republic of China and passes the Taiwan Relations Act.
- 1979–89 – The Soviet Union invades Afghanistan; America works with Pakistan and Saudi Arabia in funding, training, and arming Muslim mujahideen insurgency against Soviet occupation.
- 1979-80 – After Afghanistan, President Carter agrees détente has failed; leads worldwide boycott of Moscow 1980 Summer Olympics and withdraws SALT II from Senate consideration.
- 1979–90 – Nicaragua; America supports the Contras fighting against the pro-Communist Sandinista government in Nicaragua.
- 1979–81 – Iran becomes an Islamic republic after the overthrow of American-backed Shah; militants seize 63 American diplomats for 444 days during the Iran hostage crisis; America seizes $12 billion in Iranian assets; American rescue effort fails; hostages and assets are freed on January 20, 1981.
- 1980 – Cuba. 125,000 Cuban refugees arrive in America during the Mariel boatlift.
- 1980–88 – Iran–Iraq War. America officially neutral in the war between Iraq and Iran; America flags oil tankers to protect flow of oil in Persian Gulf, and sells arms and weaponry to both sides of the conflict.
- 1981 – President Ronald Reagan escalates Cold War with heavy new military spending and research in new weapons; forward strategy for Navy.
- 1982–

— September 29 MNF comprising forces from the United States, France, and Italy set to Lebanon to stabilize the nation in the middle of its civil war.

- 1983 –

— April 18 A suicide attack by the Iranian-supported Hezbollah terrorist group destroys the American embassy in Beirut.
— October 23 A suicide attack by Hezbollah kills 241 American servicemen, mostly Marines in Beirut.
— October 25 US invades Grenada in response to a coup d’état by Deputy Prime Minister Bernard Coard on the Caribbean island.

- 1984

— February 26 Reagan orders the Marines in Lebanon to be "redeployed to the fleet" as the withdrawal from Lebanon is euphemistically known.
— April 10 Senate votes to condemn Reagan for mining Nicaraguan waters.
— September 20 Another suicide attack by Hezbollah damages the American embassy in Beirut.

- 1985 – The US suspends its ANZUS obligations to New Zealand after David Lange's Labour government bans nuclear-armed and nuclear-powered warships.
- 1986

— March 24 Gulf of Sidra incident. Libyan attacks on American warships in the Gulf of Sidra.
— April 5 La Belle discotheque in Berlin bombed by Libyan agents. The discotheque is popular with American servicemen and two out of the three killed are American. As the NSA has broken the Libyan diplomatic codes, it is established that the bombing was planned out of the Libyan "people's bureau" (embassy) in East Berlin.
— April 15 Operation El Dorado Canyon. The US bombs Libya in response to the bombing in Berlin.
— November The news of the Iran–Contra affair breaks: White House officials sell weapons to Iran and give the profits to Contras; President Reagan embarrassed.

- 1987

— June 12 President Reagan gives the "Tear down this wall!" speech in Berlin, saying "Mr. Gorbachev, tear down this wall!". Reagan argues that tearing the Berlin Wall would be a symbol of Soviet good faith to prove Gorbachev was sincere in seeking better relations with the West.

- 1989 – End of Eastern Bloc; fall of Berlin Wall; all East European satellites break away from Moscow
- 1990 – Panama; America invades to oust Manuel Noriega.

— September 12 Four plus two treaty signed by the US, Britain, France, the Soviet Union, West Germany and East Germany formally ends World War II in Europe, grants the two German states the right to unify and ends all of the sovereign rights held by the Allies in Germany since 1945.

- 1991 – Gulf War; America leads a UN-authorized coalition to repel an Iraqi invasion out of neighboring Kuwait.
- 1991–2003 – Iraq sanctions; America and Great Britain maintain no-fly-zones in the north and south of Iraq with periodic bombings.
- 1991–93 – START II accords held by America and Russia to limit nuclear weapons
- 1991 – The Soviet Union is dissolved; Mikhail Gorbachev resigns
- 1999 – The US and NATO bomb the FR Yugoslavia, which brings an end to the Kosovo War.

== 21st century ==
- 2001

– September 11 terrorist attacks, orchestrated by Al-Qaeda terrorist network, occur on American soil.
– US and NATO forces invade Afghanistan and overthrow the Taliban.

- 2003 – US-led coalition invades Iraq to overthrow Saddam Hussein; troops remain to fight insurgency against the UN-approved elected government.
- 2004 to present – Drone attacks in Pakistan CIA maintains drone surveillance and launches hundreds of attacks on pro-Taliban targets
- 2006 – President George W. Bush signs the United States-India Peaceful Atomic Energy Cooperation Act into law; US no longer opposes India's civilian and military nuclear programs; bilateral relations improve
- 2009–2017 – The foreign policy of the Barack Obama administration downplays Bush's counterinsurgency model against terrorism. Instead it uses a light-footprint approach with expanded air strikes, extensive use of special forces and greater reliance on host-government militaries.
- 2009 – President Obama lifts all travel restrictions to see relatives in Cuba and send remittances. However, later that year, Obama approved continuing the Trading with the Enemy Act, which regulates sanctions on Cuba.
- 2011

– US removes all military forces from Iraq
– New START treaty with Russia goes into effect.
– Navy SEALs raid Al-Qaeda founder Osama bin Laden's compound in Pakistan, killing him and seizing his computers. Pakistan was not informed.

- 2013 – US threatens an air attack on Syria after it uses chemical weapons; resolved by agreement to destroy all the chemical weapons under international auspices
- 2014 – US implements economic sanctions against the Russian Federation after its annexation of Crimea.
- 2015 – US reopens its diplomatic mission in Cuba, after over five decades of closure.
- 2017 – 2021 Foreign policy of the Donald Trump administration includes major shifts in foreign policy. It sounds alarm about development by North Korea of nuclear weapons and missiles that can hit North America. It gives high priority to combating terrorism, especially from radical Islam. It prioritizes military action and deemphasizes soft power, political engagement, and diplomacy. It calls for a high wall across the southern border.
- 2017 – US formally recognizes Jerusalem as the capital of Israel but does not move embassy yet. UN General Assembly condemns US plan by a vote of 128–9.
- 2018–present – President Trump issues a series of tariffs on goods from countries such as China, India, Canada, Mexico, and the European Union. The trade partners in turn issue retaliatory tariffs. A trade war with China begins.
- 2018 – President Trump meets Russian President Vladimir Putin at the 2018 Russia–United States Summit in Finland.
- 2019 – U.S. forces kill ISIS leader Abu Bakr al-Baghdadi in Syria.
- 2020

– The United States kills Islamic Revolutionary Guard Corps leader Qasem Soleimani in a drone strike, intensifying the tense relations with Iran.
– The United States closes several of its borders in response to the COVID-19 pandemic.

- 2020-2021 - U.S. and NATO forces withdraw from Afghanistan, resulting in the re-establishment of the Taliban-led Islamic Emirate of Afghanistan. This also ended the 19 year long war in Afghanistan.
- 2022–present - The U.S. has provided over $61.4 billion in military assistance to Ukraine following the 2022 Russian Invasion of Ukraine.
- 2023–present - Following the October 7 attacks, the U.S. announced its support for Israel. The U.S. has provided over $17.9 billion in military assistance to Israel. Conflicts over Israeli military operations has caused a strained relationship between Israeli prime minister Benjamin Netanyahu and President Joe Biden. Support for Israel has caused significant debate and uproar, with, for instance, pro-Palestinian protests occurring at university campuses.
- 2024 - The U.S. and Russia exchange twenty-six people in a prisoner exchange at Ankara Esenboğa Airport in Turkey.
- 2025

– Canada and Mexico send firefighters, equipment and assistance, including firefighting aircraft, to California in response to devastating wildfires in Southern California. Ukraine and the Iranian Red Crescent Society offered assistance.
– The U.S. enters a trade-war with Mexico and Canada after Donald Trump establishes tariffs on the two nations and China. Canada and Mexico claim Trump's actions violate the United States–Mexico–Canada Agreement.
– Donald Trump and JD Vance get into an argument with Ukrainian president Volodymyr Zelenskyy at the White House over U.S. support for Ukraine. This occurs after the U.S. sided with Russia in a United Nations resolution that condemned Russian aggression against Ukraine. This is a major reversal of the Ukraine policy of the Biden Administration.
– The U.S. and Israel launch strikes on Iran during the Twelve Day War.

- 2026

– The U.S. military launches strikes on Venezuela. Additionally, U.S. forces captured Venezuelan president Nicolás Maduro and prosecuted him upon his arrival in the U.S.
– The 2026 Iran war starts with the U.S., Israel, and regional allies facing off against Iran and it's proxies. Ali Khamenei, supreme leader of Iran was assassinated by U.S.-Israeli forces at the onset of the war.

== See also ==
- History of the foreign policy of the United States
- Timeline of United States history
- Timeline of United States diplomatic relations
- History of United States diplomatic relations by country
- List of diplomatic missions of the United States
- International relations, 1648–1814
- International relations of the Great Powers (1814–1919)
- Diplomatic history of World War I
- International relations (1919–1939)
- Diplomatic history of World War II
- Cold War, 1947 to 1991
- International relations since 1989
