= John Meshullam =

John Meshullam (1799–1878) was a British born Jew. When he was four years old his father purchased a ship in order to travel to Jerusalem. On the way his plans were thwarted and instead the family settled in Salonika until conditions were more favourable for a pilgrimage. When John reached school age hee was sent back to England. Shortly after his arrival, news was received that his entire family had been massacred. John as the only surviving sibling inherited the considerable family assets. At the age of 15 John moved to Berlin to study the German language and from there decided to travel to the Levant He visited Salonika, and Jerusalem. During his travels in the Levant he came to know Joseph Wolff, then missioning for the London Society for Promoting Christianity Among the Jews, and was introduced to Christianity. Many years later he converted to Anglican Christianity. In 1842 he moved with his wife and children to Jerusalem. Just a short time after their arrival in Jerusalem, the two youngest children of the family were ravaged by smallpox, and were buried in one day in the Protestant cemetery on Mt. Zion.

Meshullam established the agricultural farm at Artas in 1845 in Palestine. In 1850 he leased lands in Artas to the Mennonite Peter Claaßen (1809–1865) and his brother Isaac (1815–1850) from Tiegen in West Prussia (a part of today's Nowy Dwór Gdański), whose families moved to Artas but left again between 1851 and 1853 for Jaffa. By the end of 1853 another group of leaseholders around Clorinda S. Minor left too, following a dispute with Meshullam. Subsequently the British Consul James Finn became deeply involved with the farm, and Elizabeth Finn purchased land there as well. The Finns left their post in 1863 and Meshullam was left alone at Urtas. His son in law, Samuel Wiseman, became involved with the farming and sale of fruit and vegetables from Urtas in the city of Jerusalem.

Meshullam died at Urtas in 1878 and was buried in the Protestant Mount Zion Cemetery. On his death his wife Mary moved to Jerusalem where she lived until her death a decade later. His daughter Elena, the first child born in Jerusalem, married Samuel Wiseman and continued to live in Jerusalem until her death in 1924. His youngest daughter Emilia married the son of Baldensperger who settled in Artas.

== Bibliography ==
- Clorinda S. Minor, Meshullam!: Or, Tidings from Jerusalem (^{1}1850), Philadelphia (Penns.): ^{2}1851, pp. 96–114, also reprint New York: Arno Press, ^{3}1977, ISBN 0-405-10302-6.
- Eisler, Ejal Jakob (1997). "Der deutsche Beitrag zum Aufstieg Jaffas 1850-1914: Zur Geschichte Palästinas im 19. Jahrhundert [The German contribution to the evolution of Jaffa, 1850–1914: (as part of) the history of Palestine in the 19th century]". Abhandlungen des Deutschen Palästina-Vereins (in German). 22. Wiesbaden: Harrassowitz. ISBN 3-447-03928-0.
