= Hilma Granqvist =

Finnish anthropologist

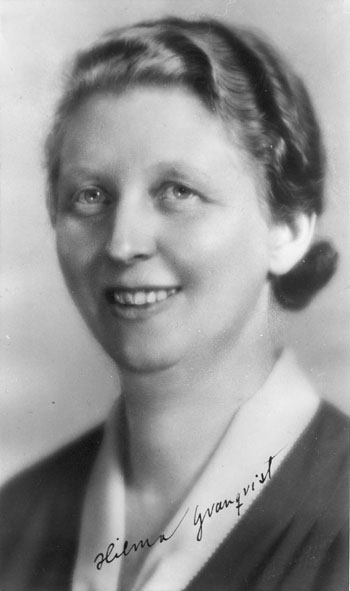
Hilma Granqvist.

Hilma Natalia Granqvist (17 July 1890 Sipoo – 25 February 1972 Helsinki) was a Swedish-speaking Finnish anthropologist who conducted long field studies of Palestinians. She was a student of Edvard Westermarck.

== Studies ==
In the 1920s Granqvist arrived at the village of Artas, just outside Bethlehem in the then British Mandate of Palestine as part of her research on the women of the Old Testament. She had gone to Palestine "in order to find the Jewish ancestors of Scripture". What she found instead was a Palestinian people with a distinct culture and way of life. She therefore changed the focus of her research to a full investigation of the customs, habits and ways of thinking of the people of that village. Granqvist ended up staying until 1931 documenting all aspects of village life. In so doing she took hundreds of photographs."

== Example of wedding song, recorded by Granqvist ==
"God knows that our outfit today
A hundred ‘royal’ robes which we have cut
For the bride to whom we are betrothed.
God knows – today is our outfit
A green and a ‘royal’ [malak] dress we have bought
For the bride to whom we are betrothed!
Ten jackets [taqsireh] have we bought
For the beloved ones in order to appease her"

(Granqvist: Marriage conditions in a Palestinian village, vol. 2 (1931), p. 42.)

== Publications ==
- Granqvist, Hilma (1927). "Stories told by Palestinian peasant women". Palästinajahrbuch.
- 1931: Marriage conditions in a Palestinian village I. Helsingfors: Societas Scientiarum Fennica
- 1935: Marriage conditions in a Palestinian village II. Helsingfors: Societas Scientiarum Fennica
- 1947: Birth and childhood among the Arabs: studies in a Muhammadan village in Palestine. Helsingfors; Söderström. (Reprinted 1975, New York: AMS Press. ISBN 0-404-57447-5)
- 1950: Child problems among the Arabs: Studies in a Muhammadan village in Palestine. Helsingfors : Söderström
- 1965: Muslim death and burial: Arab customs and traditions studies in a village in Jordan. Helsingfors: Societas Scientiarum Fennica
- 1981: Portrait of a Palestinian village: The photographs of Hilma Granqvist. Editor Karen Seger, with a foreword by Shelagh Weir. London: Third World Centre for Research and Publishing. ISBN 0-86199-006-4

== Literature ==
- Häggman, Sofia (2016). Hilma Granqvist: Antropolog med hjärtat i Palestina. Skrifter utgivna av Svenska folkskolans vänner, 208 (in Swedish). Helsingfors: Svenska folkskolans vänner. ISBN 978-952-7076-25-5. ISSN 1456-8233.
- Naili, Falestin (2007): "L’oeuvre de Hilma Granqvist: L’Orient imaginaire confronté à la réalité d’un village palestinien." Revue d’Etudes Palestiniennes, 105, pp. 74–84.
- Naili, Falestin (2008): "Hilma Granqvist, Louise Baldensperger et la ‘tradition’ de rencontre au village palestinien d’Artas." Civilisations 57, pp. 126–138.
- Sirignano, Rosanna (2012): "Mother and Child in Palestine: the Artas material in Hilma Granqvist's Nachlass at the Palestine Exploration Fund." Studi Interculturali 3/2013, pp. 159–181. Mediterránea, Centro di Studi Interculturali, Trieste. ISBN 978-1-291-59885-8
- Weir, Shelagh (1975): "Hilma Granqvist and Her Contribution to Palestine Studies." Bulletin of the British Society for Middle Eastern Studies, 2, 1, pp. 6–13.
- Weir, Shelagh (2012): "A pioneering anthropologist." Palestine, The Middle East in London, vol 8, No. 4, April–May 2012, pp. 16–17.
- Willman, Jarkko (1997): Ideal och verklighet: Hilma Granqvists studier av "Kvinnorna i Gamla testamentet" åren 1921–1925. Åbo: Åbo Akademi. ISBN 952-12-0033-2. (In Swedish.)
