= Lolworth Creek Battery =

- Location within Queensland Location within Australia
- 20.1169°S 145.3168°E
- Location: Basalt, Charters Towers Region, Queensland, Australia

History
- Design period: 1919 - 1930s (interwar period)
- Built: c. 1930 - c. 1932

Queensland Heritage Register
- Official name: Lolworth Creek Battery
- Type: state heritage (built, archaeological)
- Designated: 14 June 2003
- Reference no.: 601849
- Significant period: c. 1930-c. 1932 (fabric) c. 1932-c. 1938 (historical)
- Significant components: settling tank / pond, battery shed, battery/crusher/stamper/jaw breaker, weighbridge/weigh station, tailings dump, machinery/plant/equipment - mining/mineral processing, ford

Lolworth Creek Battery is a heritage-listed stamper battery at Basalt (100 kilometres (62 mi) west of Charters Towers), Charters Towers Region, Queensland, Australia. It was built from c. 1930 to c. 1932. It was added to the Queensland Heritage Register on 14 June 2003.

== History ==
The Lolworth Creek workings, also known as Mount Hope, officially produced about 7,584 ounces (215,000 g) of gold from quartz veins in granite country rock. Unfortunately, there is only a relatively small area free from the thick basalt which covers all but the mined area north of the creek. The workings are located in four groups of leases: Mount Hope and Crystal Oak on the north, and the Toby Creek group to the south. Government geologist W.E. Cameron inspected the reefs in 1920 and thought they might be profitably worked if they were equipped with inexpensive plant and opened out.

Auriferous copper was discovered in 1926 by W.H. Shetland in the Crystal Oak mine, and the hand-picked ore was railed to Charters Towers for treatment between 1928 and 1930. By mid-1931 76 metres (249 ft) of sinking and driving on lode material had resulted in 37 long tons (38 t) of picked gold and copper-bearing ore from about 700 long tons (710 t) of actual material broken. This just paid costs.

The Lucky Hit mineral claim near Mount Hope, was the second to be pegged on the Lolworth Creek field and caused a mild influx of diggers. By late 1932 between 40 and 50 claims had been applied for.

The battery was erected on the northern bank of Lolworth Creek, opposite its confluence with Brandy Creek, sometime between mid 1930 and 1932, when there are reports of tonnage from various claims (such as Campbell's Hope Extended) awaiting crushing. It is not known for how long the battery operated, but about 60 small gold mines operated to the south during the 1930s and records of yields of gold per ounce from tons of ore suggest that local crushing continued up to 1938.

== Description ==
The place is situated on the northern bank of Lolworth Creek at the base of a steep spur that forms a horseshoe bend in the creek. The place contains an intact five head stamp battery alongside a two-cylinder portable steam engine. Both items are located within the partly intact bush-timber frame of a battery shed. All corrugated iron cladding has been removed from the shed frame. Three earth-settling tanks reinforced with bush timber are located on the creek bank below the shed. A concreted ford across the creek serves as a low dam. The remains of a tailings sands dump and cyanide treatment area are also located on the creek bank. Above the battery there is evidence of a campsite, including the remains of a wood stove. An almost intact weighbridge with scales is a feature of this area.

Surviving plant includes:

- Five head stamp battery – Burns & Twigg Engineers Rockhampton
- Two-cylinder portable steam engine – no brand (Brown & May, Devizes?)
- Weighbridge platform – no brand (H. Pooley & Son)
- Scales - H. Pooley & Son Patentees Liverpool.

== Heritage listing ==
Lolworth Creek Battery was listed on the Queensland Heritage Register on 14 June 2003, having satisfied the following criteria.

The place demonstrates rare, uncommon or endangered aspects of Queensland's cultural heritage.

The stamp battery is a representative, but now rare product of the local manufacturers, Burns & Twigg of Rockhampton. The two-cylinder portable steam engine is also rare and may be a product of engineers Brown & May of Devizes. The place also contains a rare surviving weighbridge with scales.

The place is important in demonstrating the principal characteristics of a particular class of cultural places.

The Lolworth Creek battery is significant as a representative example of a small isolated battery and power plant of late 19th century design and manufacture still in use in the 1930s. The bush-timber frame of the battery shed is partly intact. Below the shed on the creek bank are three earth concentrate tanks which, with a group of rendered stone cyanide tanks and tailings sands, illustrate the crude processing technology. There is also evidence of a camp, including a metal wood stove.

The place is important because of its aesthetic significance.

The combination of surface ruins and natural setting creates a significant historical landscape.
