= Gwynedd, Pennsylvania =

Unincorporated community in Pennsylvania, US

- Unincorporated community
- Location within Pennsylvania Location within the United States
- Coordinates: 40°12′06″N 75°15′19″W
- Country: United States
- State: Pennsylvania
- County: Montgomery
- Township: Lower Gwynedd
- Elevation: 413 ft (126 m)
- Time zone: UTC-5 (Eastern (EST))
  - Summer (DST): UTC-4 (EDT)
- ZIP codes: 19436, 19454
- Area codes: 215, 267 and 445
- GNIS feature ID: 1203736

Gwynedd is an unincorporated community in Lower Gwynedd Township in Montgomery County, Pennsylvania, United States. Gwynedd is located at the intersection of U.S. Route 202 and Sumneytown Pike.

== Notable person ==
- Warder Cresson
