= Clorinda S. Minor =

American settler in Palestine (1806–1855)

Clorinda S. Minor (May 11, 1806 – November 6, 1855) was an American woman from Philadelphia who became influenced by clergyman William Miller. When his prophecy of the Second Coming failed, she decided to set sail for Palestine. She first traveled to Palestine in May 1849 and came to support the experimental farm set up by the Finn family at Artas. In November 1851 she set off for Palestine again and settled on the outskirts of Jaffa at a place known as Mount Hope.

== Mount Hope Colony ==
Here she joined a group that included a group of Germans from Elberfeld, which included the brothers Johann Großsteinbeck, Friedrich Wilhelm Großsteinbeck (1821–1858), Maria Katharina Großsteinbeck (1826–1862) and her husband, Gustav Thiel (1825–1907) as well as two other families. She worked on a farm owned by Rabbi Yehuda HaLevy, the rabbi of Jaffa, which was purchased in 1855 by Moses Montefiore. They were also joined by Walter Dickson (1799–1860) of Groton, Massachusetts, who belonged to the American Agricultural Mission. Herman Melville mentioned the colony during his visit and the American consul in Jerusalem Warder Cresson helped the Americans. Clorinda died in 1855 and was buried at Mount Hope.

== Writings ==
She also published a book in 1850 entitled, Meshullam! or, Tidings From Jerusalem. She observed the Sabbath though she was not a Seventh-day Adventist. She took a great interest in converting Jews to Christianity and providing work for the Jews of Palestine. In one letter she wrote "Our poor Jewish brethren are so enfeebled by want and inaction, that for the first year, with comfortable support, they will not more than be able to get accustomed and begin to work efficiently."

- Clorinda S. Minor, Meshullam!: Or, Tidings from Jerusalem (^{1}1850), Philadelphia (Penns.): ^{2}1851, pp. 96–114, also reprint New York: Arno Press, ^{3}1977, ISBN 0-405-10302-6.

== See also ==
- Hatikva Quarter
