= Mount Hope Cemetery =

Mount Hope Cemetery may refer to:

In Canada:

- Mount Hope Catholic Cemetery, Toronto, Ontario
- Mount Hope Cemetery (Kitchener), Kitchener, Ontario

In the United States:

- Mount Hope Cemetery (San Diego), California
- Mount Hope Cemetery (Independence, Kansas), featured in My Ghost Story
- Mount Hope Cemetery, Hiawatha Township, Brown County, Kansas
- Mount Hope Cemetery (Bangor, Maine)
- Mount Hope Cemetery (Boston), Boston, Massachusetts
- Mount Hope Cemetery (Brooklyn), a Jewish cemetery in New York City
- Mount Hope Cemetery (Chicago), Illinois, burial site of Gustavus Franklin Swift and Lil JoJo
- Mount Hope Cemetery (Hastings-on-Hudson, New York)
- Mount Hope Cemetery (Lemay, Missouri), listed on the National Register of Historic Places in St. Louis County, Missouri
- Mount Hope Cemetery (Lansing, Michigan)
- Mount Hope Cemetery (Hill County, Montana), a cemetery in Hill County, Montana
- Mount Hope Cemetery (Omaha, Nebraska), a cemetery in Omaha, Nebraska
- Mount Hope Cemetery (Rochester), New York
- Mount Hope Cemetery (Raleigh, North Carolina), listed on the National Register of Historic Places in Wake County, North Carolina
- Mount Hope Cemetery (Watertown, South Dakota)
- Mount Hope Cemetery (Franklin, Tennessee), burial site of Minnie Pearl, Felton Jarvis, Henry Forrest
