= Mount Hope, Licking County, Ohio =

Ghost town in Ohio, USA

Coordinates: 39.954°N 82.312°W

Mount Hope is a ghost town in Licking County, in the U.S. state of Ohio.

== History ==
By 1917, Mount Hope was described as "virtually extinct".
