= Mount Hope (Cheverly, Maryland) =

Historic house in Maryland, United States

- U.S. National Register of Historic Places
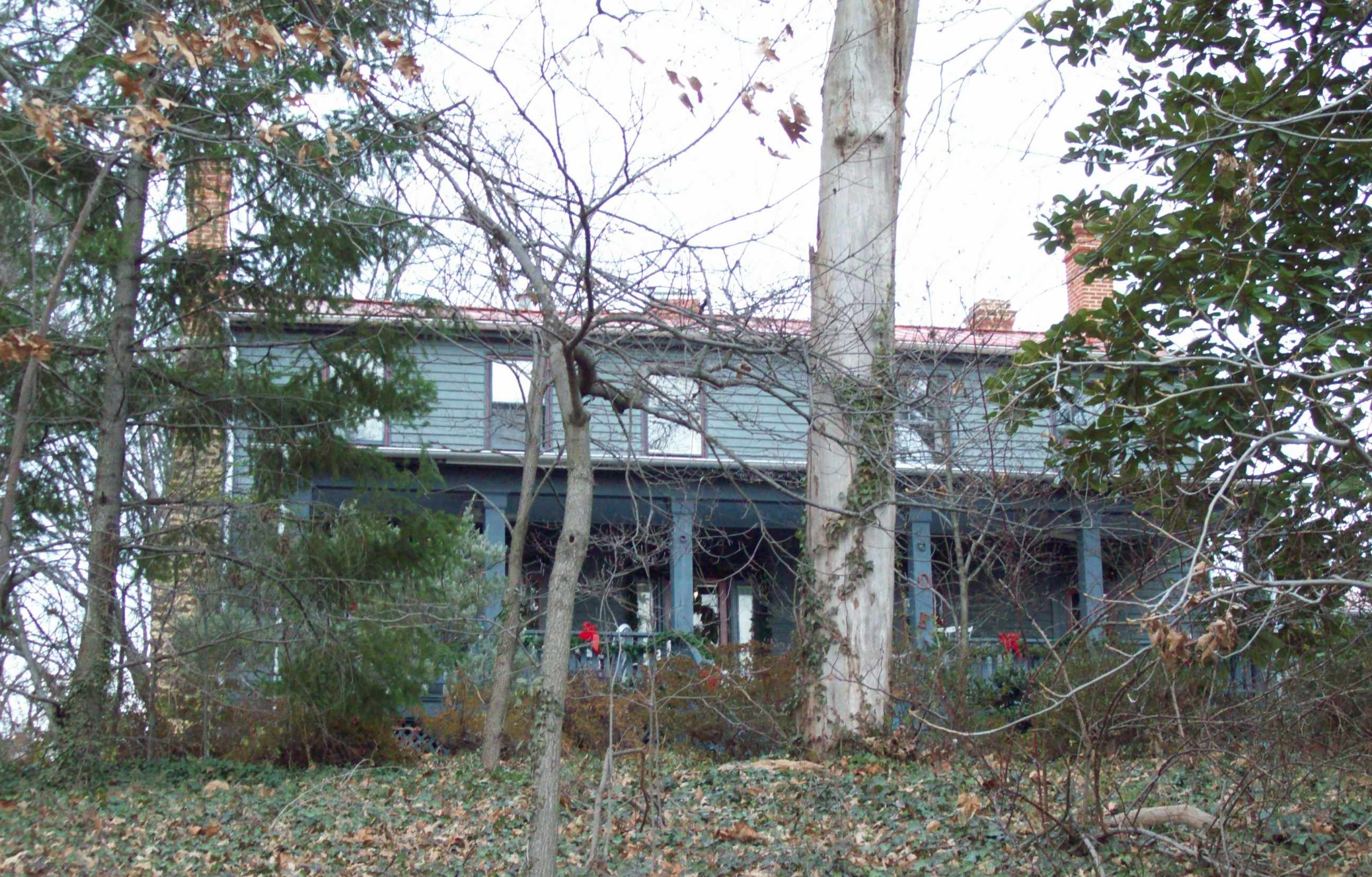
- Mount Hope, December 2008

- Location within Maryland Location within the United States
- Location: 1 Cheverly Circle, Cheverly, Maryland
- Coordinates: 38°55′20″N 76°54′47″W
- Area: 1.1 acres (0.45 ha)
- Built: 1839
- Architect: Magruder, Fielder, Jr.
- NRHP reference No.: 78003180
- Added to NRHP: November 29, 1978

Mount Hope is located at 1 Cheverly Circle in the town of Cheverly, Prince George's County, Maryland. The plantation house is a two-story, five-bay frame house built in several stages. The three-bay west section was built about 1834, and included an earlier overseer's cabin, c. 1782, with a two-bay "new addition" to the east in the 1860s, after the Civil War. A one-story kitchen wing appears to date from the 1830s as well, building on earlier foundations. A broad front porch was added in the early 20th century along with a 3-bay garage and screened porch (which housed the town's Delco Power Plant).

The home was built by Fielder Magruder, Jr., member of the prominent Magruder family who first settled in Maryland in 1652. Part of the house sits on the stone foundations of an earlier structure. The earlier component is contemporary with an outbuilding c. 1782 which also remain on the property. The town of Cheverly occupies much of the original 716-acre (2.90 km^{2}) tobacco plantation of Fielder Magruder, Jr. The house was formerly the town symbol, appearing on the official town seal and town flag. The house was renovated from 1919 to 1922, as the home and office of Robert Marshall, founder of Cheverly. He lived there until 1929. Cheverly's first mayor owned Mount Hope from 1941 to 1977. It was the town's official symbol from 1931 until 2020 when the town council voted to remove the image of the plantation from the seal. The property was extensively restored in 1985 and 2005 by the current owners, Drs. Elizabeth Tuckermanty and Dale Manty.

Historical myths abound regarding a number of events at Mount Hope over its approximately 232 years as a residence. These include British troops allegedly stopping at the Magruder Spring on the plantation on August 24, 1814, en route to the armed resistance at the Battle of Bladensburg and burning of Washington. And there is the case of a young nephew (John?) Magruder, lieutenant in the CSA, mortally wounded at the Battle of Gettysburg, transported by buckboard (behind enemy lines) to his aunt and uncle's house where he died a fortnight after arriving. The mythical ghost of a young woman associate of Lieutenant Magruder, with a wry sense of humor, occasionally visits Mount Hope.
