= Mount Hope (Nevada) =

Summit in Nevada

Coordinates: 39°47′43″N 116°11′18″W

Mount Hope is a summit in the U.S. state of Nevada. The elevation is 8,376 feet (2,553 m).

Mount Hope (previously called Hope Mountain) was named after Samuel J. Hope.
