= Mount Hope, Queensland =

Mining lease in Queensland, Australia

Mount Hope refers to a mining lease in the north-west of Queensland near Mount Isa. (Note: This Mount Hope is not to be confused with the NSW, Mount Hope Mine (see Mount Hope, New South Wales). Also not to be confused by ‘Mount Hope’ a 13,759 hectares (34,000 acres) property including a homestead that is a 40 minute drive from Roma, Queensland.)

The lease for Mount Hope is important to understand Australian history and the economy in relation to mining. The mine has operated sporadically since prior to 1900. The Lolworth Creek Battery operations also were referred to as Mount Hope. The current operators and 100% owners of the lease are listed on the Australian Securities Exchange. Products of the mine were historically copper as the main mining resource.

== Location ==
Mount Hope is located in the Shire of Cloncurry near the towns of Cloncurry and Mount Isa in the north-west of Queensland. It also is not far from the Duchess mine (which was famous for its gold and copper). The area has a number of mines including Eliott, Lady Fanny, Duchess and others.

== History ==
Copper was discovered in the area in the late 1800s. Shares for the Mount Hope mining venture were successfully floated in Melbourne and in 1906 were oversubscribed. In 1907, the “Mount Hope Limited” mining activities were reported on, including the amount in tonnes of resources mined. In April 1908 the mine at Mount Hope closed for a time. There are a number of copper mines that closed or have similarly operated sporadically mining various minerals in the Mount Isa area. The Lolworth workings were also included operations on the Mount Hope lease and were sometimes referred to as Mount Hope operations. Integrated Global Resources Pty Ltd owned the mining lease prior to sale in April 2022 to Carnaby Resources Limited (ASX: CNB) who acquired 100% of the mining lease at Mount Hope.

== See also ==
- Mining in Queensland
- Mount Isa Mines
- Mount Isa Mine Early Infrastructure
- Lolworth Creek Battery
