= Warder Cresson =

American diplomat (1798–1860)

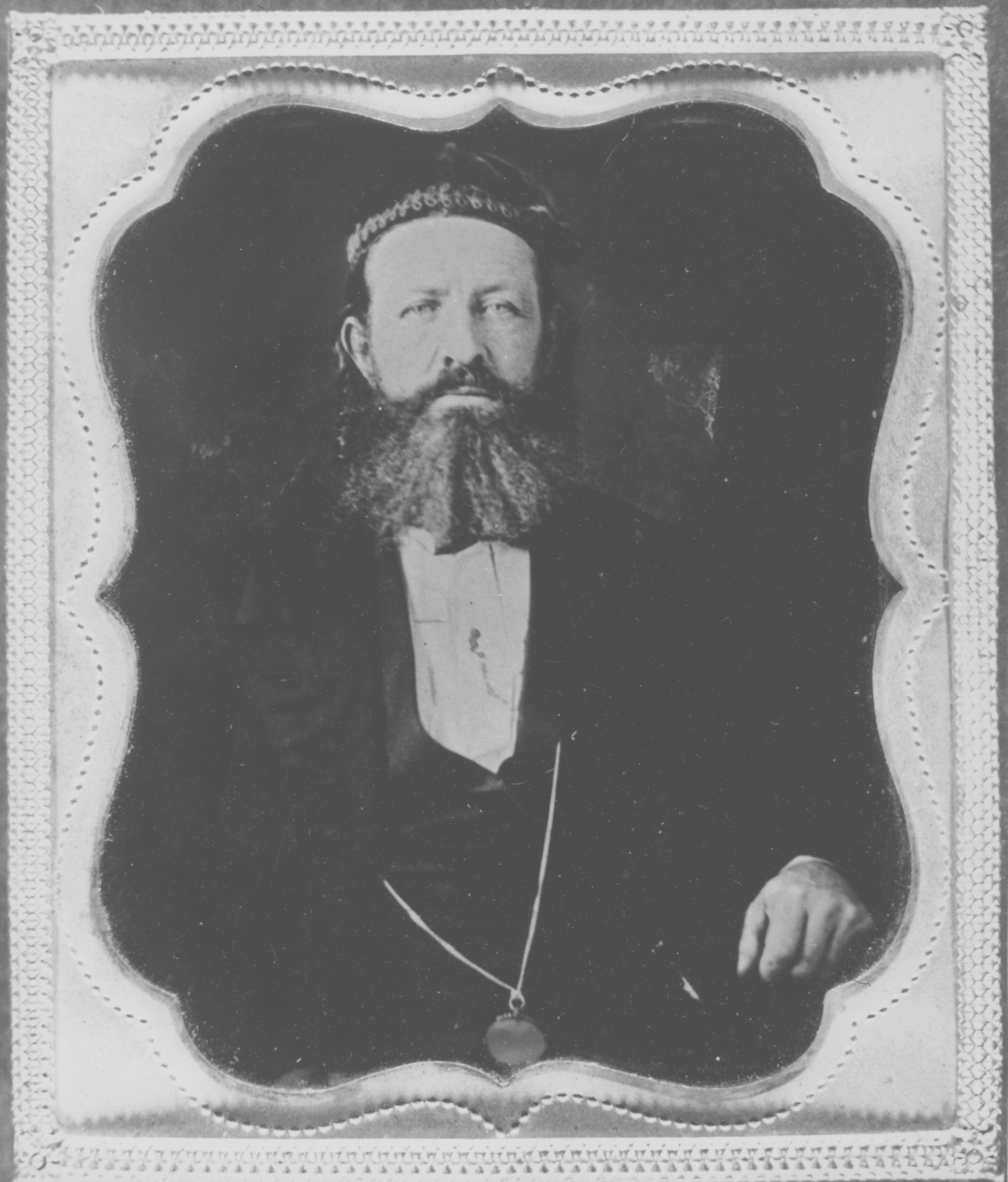

1st American Consul to Jerusalem
- In office 1844 – 1848 (unofficial)
- President: John Tyler; James K. Polk

Personal details
- Born: July 13, 1798 Philadelphia, Pennsylvania
- Died: October 27, 1860 (aged 62) Jerusalem, Ottoman Empire
- Resting place: Mount of Olives, Jerusalem

Warder Cresson (July 13, 1798 – October 27, 1860), later known as Michael Boaz Israel (Hebrew: מיכאל בועז ישראל, romanized: Mikha'el Bo'az Yisra'el), was an American convert to Judaism, proto-Zionist and diplomat. He was appointed the first U.S. Consul to Jerusalem in 1844, only to have the appointment rescinded 8 days later.

== Early life ==
Warder Cresson was born in Philadelphia, Pennsylvania to Quaker parents John Elliott Cresson (1773–1814) and Mary Warder (1776-1863). He was descended from Pierre Cresson, one of the early settlers of Harlem, New York, whose grandson, Solomon, moved to Philadelphia in the early 18th century.

In 1815, he was apprenticed (probably to the Elliott family of Darby & Kingsessing) to learn farming; and is listed in the records of the records of the Darby Meeting. In March 1819, he moved with his family to Bensalem, where he attended the Byberry Meetinghouse.

In 1821, Cresson married Elizabeth Townsend, with whom he had six children, and ran a farm in Gwynedd, Pennsylvania, a suburb of Philadelphia.

In 1830 he published a pamphlet entitled Babylon the Great Is Falling! The Morning Star, or Light from on High, in which he deplored the extravagance and evil tendencies of the times, and exhorted all Quakers to lead a better and less wayward life. He went through a period of strong religious upheaval, joining a series of sects that appeared to him to represent true religion.

In 1840, he met Isaac Leeser and became deeply interested in Judaism. Cresson was also influenced by the writings of Mordecai Manuel Noah, who believed that the Jews would soon return to live in Palestine, their national homeland.

== First visit to Palestine ==
On May 17, 1844, Cresson was appointed American consul at Jerusalem, the first person to hold this office. However, the Secretary of State John C. Calhoun rescinded the appointment only 8 days later, after being told by Samuel D. Ingham that Cresson was "a very weak-minded man and his mind, what there is of it, quite out of order". Nevertheless, Cresson continued to claim the rights of a consul until 1846, even though the US minister Constantinople confirmed his lack of credentials. He used a fake consular stamp to provide protection to persons not eligible for American assistance.

William Thackeray, who met Cresson soon after he arrived in Palestine, reported:

He expects to see the millennium in three years, and has accepted the office of consul at Jerusalem, so as to be on the spot in readiness. ... He was a tradesman, who made a considerable fortune, and lived at a country house in comfortable retirement. But his opinion is that the prophecies of Scripture are about to be accomplished; that the day of the return of the Jews is at hand, and the glorification of the restored Jerusalem. He is to witness this; he and a favorite dove with which he travels; and he forsook home and comfortable country house, in order to make this journey. He has no other knowledge of Syria but what he derives from the prophecy; and this (as he takes his office gratis) has been considered a sufficient reason for his appointment by the United States Government. As soon as he arrived, he sent and demanded an interview with the Pasha; explained to him his interpretation of the Apocalypse, in which he has discovered that the Five Powers and America are about to intervene in Syrian affairs, and the infallible return of the Jews to Palestine. ... I doubt whether any government has received or appointed so queer an ambassador.

While in Jerusalem he became close to the Sephardic community. He was a friend of Chacham Yehiel Cohen and the next chief rabbi, Elyashar. In 1848, against the wishes of the Chief Rabbi and Beth din, he converted to Judaism and adopted the name Michael Boaz Israel. The circumstances of his conversion provoked a dispute over whether a convert should keep the laws of Shabbat in the interval between circumcision and immersion in the mikveh.

== Return to the United States ==
Cresson returned to the United States in September 1848. Having been bitterly opposed to the conversion activities of Episcopalian missionaries in Palestine, he was incensed to find that his wife had converted to Episcopalianism. In addition, a major family dispute over money erupted. In 1849, his wife and other family members applied to have him declared a lunatic incapable of managing his own affairs. One of the accusations was that he planned to rebuild the Jewish Temple on Mount Moriah. A jury of six found him guilty, though he was apparently never incarcerated.

Cresson appealed this decision, and the trial, which went on for six days in May 1851, became one of the famous cases of the time. Eminent counsel were retained on both sides and nearly one hundred witnesses were called. Cresson's wife presented an array of charges that included Cresson's propensity to change religions, that he claimed Christ was a Negro, and that he had seen angels during his circumcision. Many prominent citizens, including four doctors, testified that, on the contrary, Cresson was perfectly sane. An expert witness Col. Browne testified that the roots of Cresson's hair had none of the abnormalities that were certain indicators of insanity. The judge told the jury that religious convictions were not to be taken into account in determining sanity. The jury found Cresson to be sane.

The summing-up of defence lawyer Horatio Hubbell Jr. was published in The Occident and American Jewish Advocate in 1863, with comments by Isaac Leeser.

== Later life in Palestine ==
In 1852, Cresson returned to Jerusalem and actively supported efforts then being made towards Jewish settlement in Palestine. In the fall, he announced his intention of establishing an agricultural colony in the Valley of Rephaim, though it never eventuated. In March 1853, he began writing for The Occident and sent a circular from Jerusalem soliciting assistance for his projects. Though interspersed with theology and quotations from the Bible, the circular is one that only a practical farmer and educator could have produced. Cresson believed that the prevailing distress could be relieved by the establishment of agricultural colonies, and that oppressed Jews from all parts of the world should return to Zion.

Cresson married a Sephardic Jewish woman, Rachel Moledano (or Moleno or Moleano), with whom he had two children, Abigail Ruth and David Ben-Zion. David died before Cresson, while Abigail died in the cholera epidemic of 1865. He lived the life of a pious Oriental Jew, dressed as a native Sephardi, and became a prominent leader of the community.

Herman Melville, who visited Jerusalem in 1857, wrote in his journal, "Warder Crisson [sic] of Philadelphia—An American turned Jew—divorced from former wife—married a Jewess &c.—Sad." It is generally believed that Cresson was the model for the central character Nathan in Melville's epic poem Clarel.

Cresson probably died on October 27, 1860, though some documents give slightly different dates. Vice-consul Lazarus Murad was later dismissed for attempting to steal Cresson's estate.

In 2013, Cresson's lost gravesite was rediscovered in the Mount of Olives Jewish Cemetery.

== Published works ==
- The Two Witnesses, Moses and Elijah, London, 1844
- The Good Olive-Tree, Israel, 1844
- Jerusalem, the Center and Joy of the Whole Earth, Philadelphia, 1844
- The Key of David; David the True Messiah, Philadelphia, 1852
