= Mount Hope, Jaffa =

Coordinates: 32°3′38.52″N 34°47′1.83″E

Mount Hope
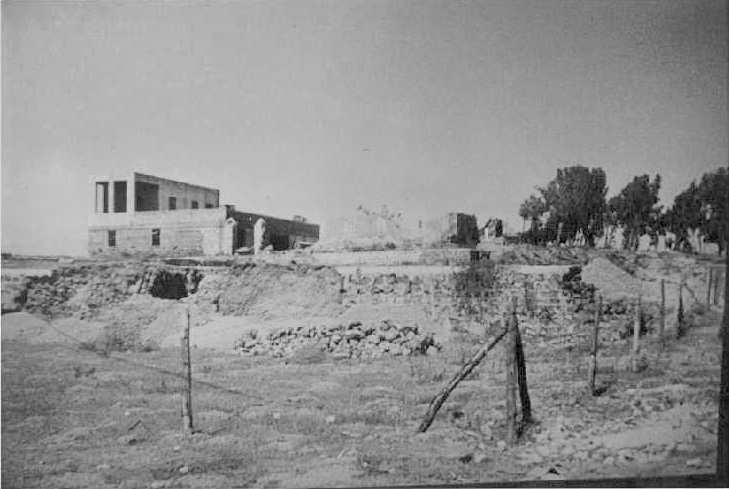
- The remnants of Mount Hope in 1933
- Interactive map of Mount Hope
- Type: Educational Farm
- Location: Jaffa

History
- Built: 1853

Mount Hope (Hebrew: הר התקווה) was a farm established northeast of Jaffa in 1853 by two groups of Millennial Protestant Christians from Prussia and the United States. Their goal was to train the Jews of Palestine to farm and thereby accelerate the Second Coming of Jesus. Following various hardships including malaria and an 1858 attack by locals, the settlement was abandoned.

== History ==
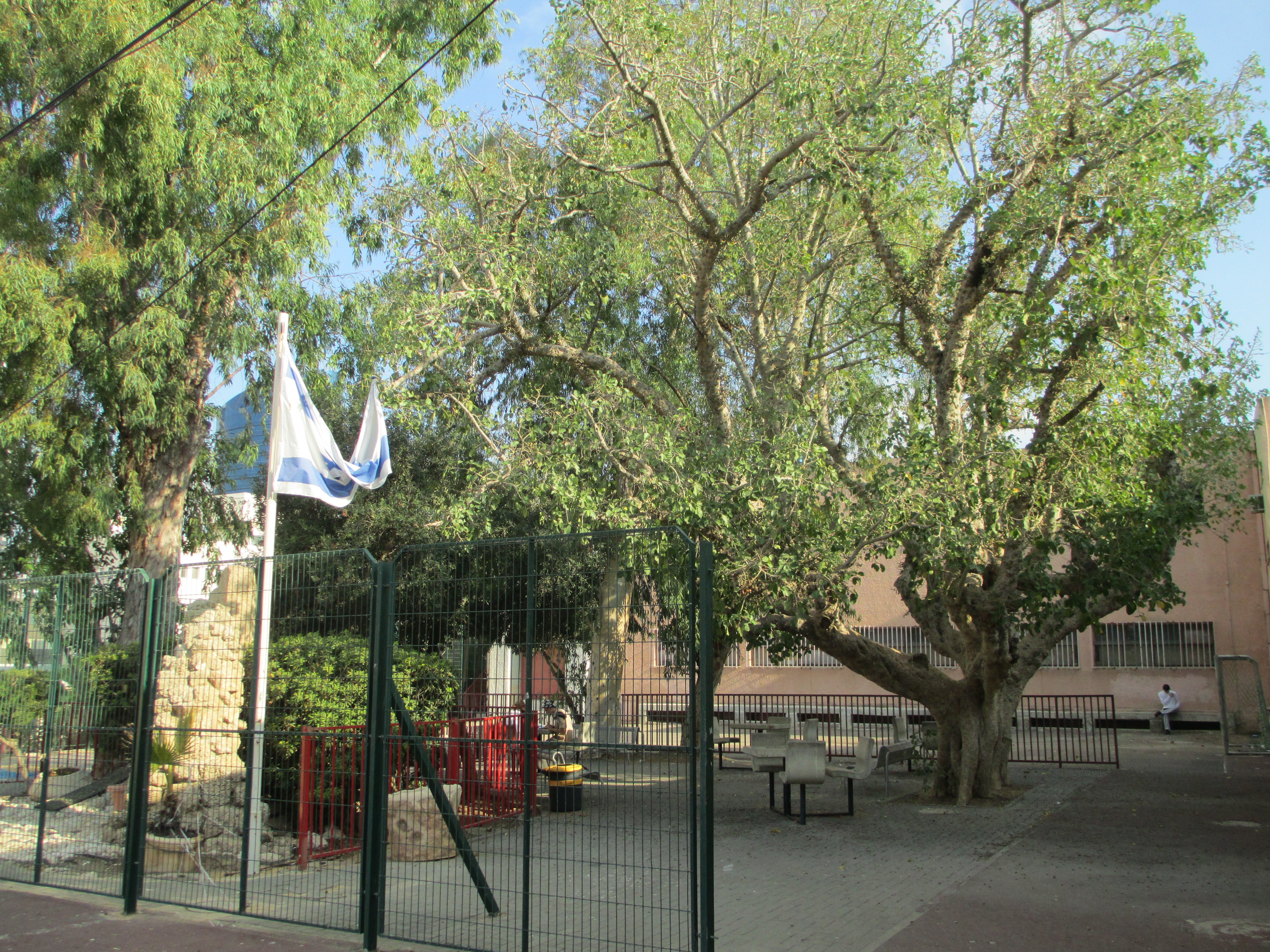
The sycamore tree planted by Mount Hope settlers

Mount Hope was established in 1853 by two groups of Millennial Protestant Christians from Prussia and the United States. The Prussian group of founders, most of them members of the Großsteinbeck family, emigrated to Palestine from Wuppertal, Germany, in November 1849. After living in Jerusalem, they moved to Jaffa in 1851. The American group, Sabbath-observant Christians from Philadelphia, arrived in early 1853 and were led by Clorinda Minor, who came to Palestine with her son Charles.

Clorinda Minor leased a 30-dunam (0.030 km^{2}; 0.012 sq mi) plot of land from Peter Klassen (David Ben Avraham), on which the Mount Hope farm was built. She also leased an orchard from Yehuda Halevi Margoza. The group worked together with Jewish workers from Jaffa. Minor wrote in a letter to the Jewish-American magazine Occident requesting financial assistance. In 1854, another family - Walter Dickson, his wife Sara, his son Henry, and his daughters Elmira, Anne, Marie, and Caroline - came to the farm from Groton, Massachusetts. In June 1854 there was a double wedding on the farm: Johann Großsteinbeck to Elmira Dickson and Friedrich Großsteinbeck to Marie Dickson.

In 1855, British financier Moses Montefiore returned to Palestine. He bought Margoza's lands and appointed Minor as the head of the orchard, now the site of Tel Aviv's Montefiore neighborhood. The residents suffered malaria and the harassment of their Arab neighbors from Salama. With the death of Clorinda Minor from cancer on November 6, 1855, Charles, Clorinda's son, continued to manage the Montefiore orchard for another two years and then returned to the United States. Some of the members of Clorinda's group returned to the United States; there were probably only three families left on the farm: the brothers Johann and Friedrich Großsteinbeck with their wives, the Dickson sisters, and the Dickson family: parents Walter and Sarah and their children Henry and Caroline. In January 1857, American author Herman Melville visited the farm and wrote about it in his notes: "The agricultural school built by the Americans for the Jews failed, The Jews would come, pretend to be touched & all that, get clothing & then—vanished".

== Attack and aftermath ==
On January 11, 1858, five locals attacked the farm. They murdered Friedrich Steinbeck and raped his wife Marie and her mother Sarah Dickson. Modern Israeli scholars contend that the attack was motivated by jealousy rather than nationalism. Under pressure from the US and Prussian consulates, the Ottoman authorities arrested four of the assailants and sentenced them to life imprisonment. In June 1858, the farm's remaining residents left the colony and emigrated to the United States. Following the news of the attack, the German Templer community decided to postpone their arrival in Palestine.

== Legacy and commemoration ==
The grandson of Elmira and Johann Großsteinbeck is American author John Steinbeck (his grandfather, Johann Adolf Großsteinbeck, shortened the surname when he immigrated to the United States). The "Shevach" school (now "Shevah Mofet") was established in 1948 in the area of Mount Hope. In the schoolyard stands a sycamore tree planted by the settlers on the farm. On January 30, 1966, Steinbeck visited Israel, during which he toured the site. The Hatikva Quarter in south Tel Aviv was named after the farm.

== See also ==
- American–German Colony
