= Kollel Shomrei HaChomos =

Charity supporting Hungarian Jews in Israel

Kollel Shomrei haChomos
- כולל שומרי החומות
- Formation: 1858, (Ottoman Empire) Ottoman Palestine
- Purpose: Financial support for Hungarian Jewish emigrants
- Headquarters: Jerusalem, Israel
- Location: Meah Shearim, Givat Shaul, Ramat Shlomo
- Region served: Israel
- Methods: Fundraising, donations, halukka, pushka
- Nesyim (Presidents): Avraham Shmuel Binyamin Sofer, Meir Eisenstein
- Key people: Rabbi Yitzchok Zvi Ratzersdorfer, Rabbi Aron Teitelbaum, Rabbi Zalman Teitelbaum

Kollel Shomrei haChomos (Hebrew: כולל שומרי החומות) is a financial charity institute or kollel set up to support the community of Hungarian-Jews who emigrated to the Holy Land, hence it is called by many the Hungarian Kollel. The Hungarian Jews separated themselves in 1858 from its mother institute Kolel Chibas Yerushalayim which at one point in time included the Jewish communities of the entire Austrian Hungarian Kingdom. Kolel Chibas Yerushalayim was itself a breakaway from the original Kolel Perushim, established by the students of the Vilna Gaon. Two leading Hungarian rabbis were appointed as the "Nesyim" or "Presidents of the Kolel, Avraham Shmuel Binyamin Sofer, author of Ketav Sofer, and Meir Eisenstein. In honor of these two leaders the Hungarian Kolel was also called "House of Sofer and Meir"

== History ==
By the year 1881 the kollel had built up many apartment buildings to provide housing for its members. This was accomplished in great part thanks to donations by Rabbi Yitzchok Zvi Ratzersdorfer, a Hungarian Jew who later relocated to Antwerp, Belgium and helped build the Jewish community there. These houses are called Batei Ungarin, in Yiddish Ungarishe Hoiser - the Hungarian Houses.

In 1873, Aaron Hershler, a yeshiva student at the Kollel, was standing guard at the Montefiore Windmill, a landmark windmill in Jerusalem, when a group of Arab Muslims from Silwan attempted to rob his family's home in Mishkenot Sha'ananim, the first Jewish neighborhood outside the walls of the Old City of Jerusalem. Hershler took chase and was shot 12 times. He died in the hospital on 5 January and was buried in the Mount of Olives Jewish Cemetery. Seventy-five years after his death, Hershler was recognized by the Israel Defense Forces as the first "national martyr" in the Jewish-Arab conflict. He is one of approximately three dozen Jews killed during Ottoman-ruled Palestine, who are commemorated as part of Israeli's annual Yom Hazikaron memorial day.

When the Jewish community had to flee the Old City during the 1938 riots, the Kollel moved its operations to other neighborhoods, including Mea Shearim, Givat Shaul and Ramat Shlomo.

The kollel is still active with Pushka and Halukka money gatherings in America and Europe for the benefit of Jerusalem, and is managing many Torah institutes of the Yishuv haYashan of Jerusalem. Usually it is adherent to the rulings of the Edah HaChareidis; both Grand Rabbis of Satmar, Rabbi Aron and Rabbi Zalman Teitelbaum are on the presidency board among others.

== See also ==
- Shomrei HaChomos Synagogue
- Kolel Chibas Yerushalayim
- Kollel Hod
