= Bust of Winston Churchill, Mishkenot Sha'ananim =

Sculpture by Oscar Nemon in Jerusalem

Winston Churchill
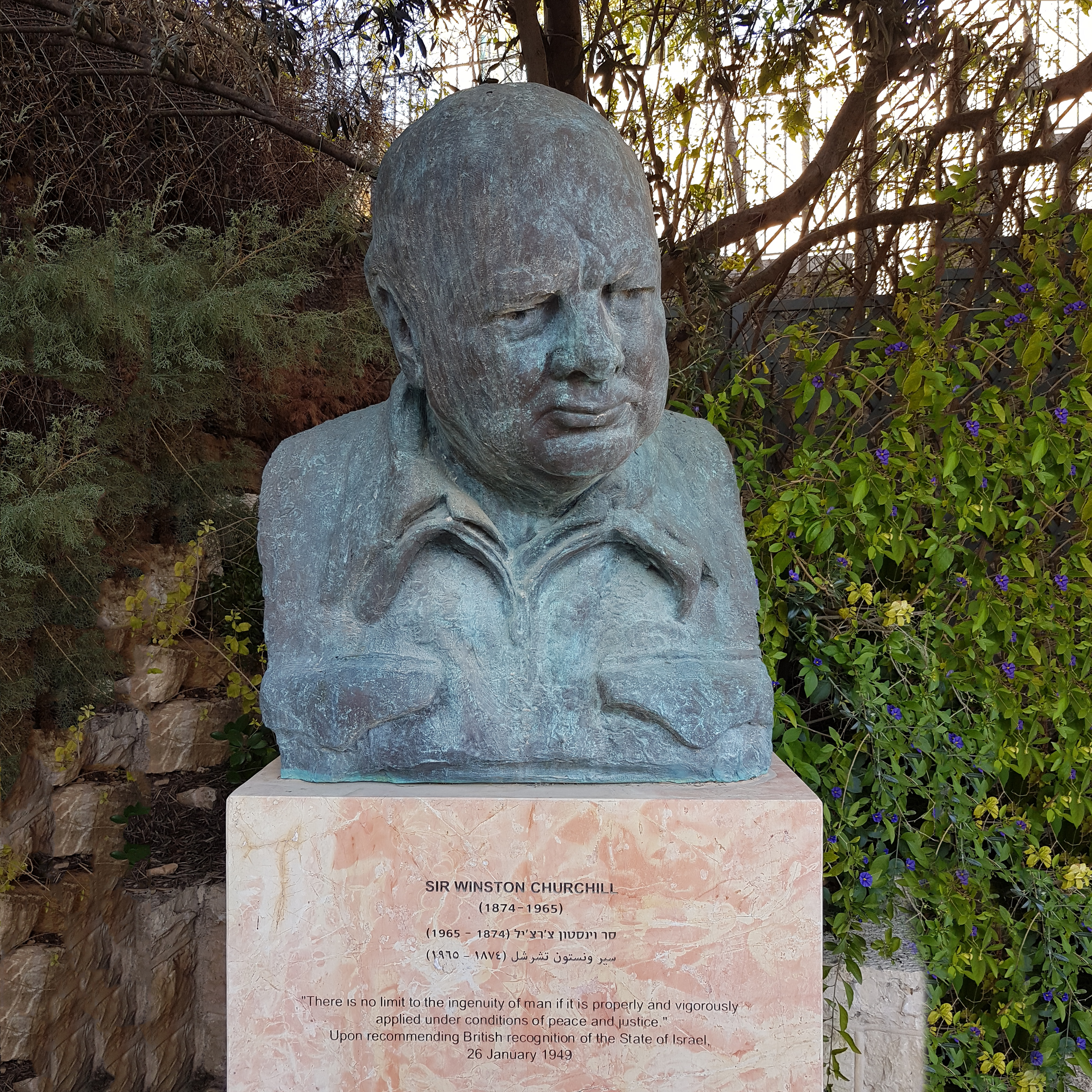
- Artist: Oscar Nemon
- Year: 2002; 24 years ago
- Type: Bronze Bust
- Dimensions: 85 cm × 75 cm × 47 cm (33 in × 30 in × 19 in)
- Weight: 125 kg
- Location: Mishkenot Sha’ananim Jerusalem, Israel

The bronze bust of former British prime minister Sir Winston Churchill at Mishkenot Sha’ananim, Jerusalem was created by portrait sculptor Oscar Nemon. Anthony Rosenfelder, together with MK Isaac Herzog, initiated the process of erecting the bust of Churchill in Jerusalem.

The work is located in the Yael Garden, below the historic Mishkenot Sha’ananim building, overlooking the walls of the Old City of Jerusalem. It was unveiled by Churchill's great-grandson Randolph Churchill on November 4, 2012 at a ceremony attended by MK Isaac Herzog, British Ambassador to Israel HE Matthew Gould, British Consul-General to Jerusalem Sir Vincent Fean, Israel's Ambassador to the Court of St James's Daniel Taub, Jerusalem Mayor Nir Barkat, President of the Jerusalem Foundation Ambassador Mark Sofer, Chairperson of Mishkenot Sha’ananim Ruth Cheshin, and Anthony Rosenfelder, a trustee of the Jerusalem Foundation in the United Kingdom.

The bust is identical to the one that stands in Freedom Court at the Franklin D. Roosevelt Library

== Description ==
The bronze bust is 75 cm wide, 85 cm high, and 47 cm deep and weighs 125 kilograms. It was created using a cast made in 1955 from a life model. The bust is placed on a marble stand engraved with Churchill's words: "There is no limit to the ingenuity of man if it is properly and vigorously applied under conditions of peace and justice."

== History ==
The initiative for erecting the statue came from Anthony Rosenfelder, a trustee of the Jerusalem Foundation, who felt that Israel lacked an appropriate commemoration of Churchill's role in creating the Jewish state.

Nemon viewed Churchill as one of the most remarkable personalities of all time and his portraits of him are characterized by an intensity that reveals his admiration for the statesman. He first met him in Marrakesh in 1951 and the two formed a deep friendship. Churchill was his most frequent subject. Nemon wrote that he found him bellicose, challenging, and deliberately provocative. His sculptures go beyond being likenesses of Churchill to comprise a kind of account of his life. In 1955, Nemon created a bronze cast of Churchill, made from a life model.

The bust was dedicated on November 4, 2012 in the presence of the former prime minister's great-grandson Randolph Churchill, MK Isaac Herzog, British Ambassador to Israel HE Matthew Gould, British Consul-General to Jerusalem Sir Vincent Fean, Israel's Ambassador to the Court of St James's Daniel Taub, Jerusalem Mayor Nir Barkat, President of the Jerusalem Foundation Ambassador Mark Sofer and Chairperson of Mishkenot Sha’ananim Ruth Cheshin.

Churchill's bust was installed in Yael's Garden at Mishkenot Sha’ananim, overlooking Jerusalem's Old City walls in recognition of his support for a Jewish state.

== Replicas and related statues ==
The bust is identical to the one standing in Freedom Court at the Franklin D. Roosevelt Library, Hyde Park, New York.

== See also ==
- Yemin Moshe
- Montefiore Windmill
- Oscar Nemon
