= Len Doyal =

American-British medical ethicist and academic (1944–2025)

- Born: 10 August 1944; Atlanta, Georgia, United States
- Died: 10 June 2025 (aged 80)
- Education: Georgia State University
- Spouse: Lesley
- Children: 2

Len Doyal, FRSA, FRSocMed (10 August 1944 – 10 June 2025) was an American-British medical ethicist and academic who was emeritus professor of medical ethics at Queen Mary, University of London.

== Background ==
Doyal was born in Atlanta, Georgia on 10 August 1944. He studied philosophy and sociology at Georgia State University, earning his undergraduate degree (with distinction) in 1966. That same year he was awarded a Fulbright Scholarship to study with Karl Popper at the London School of Economics.

He was married to Lesley Doyal and they had two children and four grandchildren. Doyal lived in both central London and Perugia, Italy. He died on 10 June 2025, at the age of 80.

== Early career ==
Doyal worked for over two decades at Middlesex University (then Middlesex Polytechnic), developing and teaching a course on the natural and social sciences, political and moral philosophy, as well as politics and philosophy of technology.

In 1986, he was appointed Principal Lecturer in Philosophy. That same year, he co-authored Empiricism, Explanation and Rationality with Roger Harris, a popular introduction to the philosophy of social sciences.

== Medical ethics and law ==
In the 1980s, he became interested in ethics and law applied to medicine and at University College and The Middlesex Hospitals joint medical school he organised and jointly taught on a part-time basis on the subject. The Nuffield Foundation gave him a grant to produce, write and direct a video library and associated teaching materials on informed consent, which was published in 1990.

Doyal was given a joint appointment as senior lecturer in medical ethics in St. Bartholomew's and The Royal London Medical College, University of London in 1990, being made Reader in 1994. He was promoted to Professor of Medical Ethics in 1996. The General Medical Council and General Dental Council both praised his academic programme Ethics and Law Applied to Medicine and Dentistry for the way it integrates law and ethics with clinical practice. In 2000, he was made a Licensed Practitioner within the Higher Education Academy and was awarded the Drapers' Prize for Excellence in Teaching.

== Research ==
Doyal's areas of academic interest in clinical ethics concern the moral foundations of the duties of clinical care, informed consent, medical research, passive and active euthanasia, the rationing of scarce health care resources, the rights of children and the boundaries of respect for confidentiality.

He was an editor of the Journal of Postgraduate Medicine.

== Consultancy and other professional practice ==
Until his retirement, Doyal was an honorary consultant to the Royal Hospitals Trust. He has also consulted, written and lectured extensively.

In 1996, he established the Trust Clinical Ethics Committee, including writing Terms of Reference and drafting policies concerning good professional practice.

Doyal has also been a consultant to many important medical organisations, including the Department of Health, the General Medical Council, the Medical Research Council, the Royal Colleges of Medicine and Surgery and the British Medical Association upon whose Ethics Committee he sat for nearly a decade. Most recently, he chaired the Department of Health Panel on the Ethical Evaluation of Student Projects within Medical Education.

== Discussion of controversial issues ==
One of many issues has discussed publicly is euthanasia. He has advocated that non-voluntary euthanasia should be legal under certain limited circumstances. His position was criticised by Deborah Annetts of Dignity in Dying.

== Lecture cancelled because of disruptive protestors ==
In April 2009, a lecture by Doyal and debate in Cork University Hospital were cancelled after protesters took up positions in the lecture theatre. Father Paul Kramer, a Catholic priest, was among the protesters and ordered Doyal to leave Ireland. The police who were present made no attempt to stop the protesters. Doyal had to be escorted out by hospital security guards. The talk had been criticised by Bishop John Buckley, Senator Jim Walsh and Senator John Hanafin, though Senator David Norris accused Senator Walsh of scaremongering. The Health Service Executive said the lecture was cancelled for safety reasons.

== Books ==
- Empiricism, Explanation and Rationality (with Roger Harris)
- A Theory of Human Need (with Ian Gough)
- Informed Consent in Medical Research (with Jeffrey S. Tobias)

Awards
Preceded by Mike Davis	Deutscher Memorial Prize; 1992; With: Ian Gough	Succeeded by Harvey J. Kaye
