= Victor Hochhauser =

British music promoter (1923–2019)

Victor Hochhauser CBE
- Born: 27 March 1923; Košice, Czechoslovakia (now Slovakia)
- Died: 22 March 2019 (aged 95); London, England
- Occupation: Music promoter
- Spouse(s): Lilian Hochhauser (née Shields) (1949–2019; his death)
- Children: 4, including Mark Sofer and Daniel Hochhauser

Victor Hochhauser CBE (27 March 1923 – 22 March 2019) was a British music promoter.

== Early life ==
Hochhauser was born on 27 March 1923 in Košice, Czechoslovakia, the son of David Hochhauser, an industrialist. His grandfather and great-grandfather were rabbis. He was a direct descendant of the Chatam Sofer, a leading Orthodox Rabbi of European Jewry in the nineteenth century. Hochhauser came with his family to the UK from Slovakia in 1939, as a refugee from the Nazis.

== Career ==
His career as an impresario started in 1945 at London's Royal Albert Hall.

Following the death of Stalin in 1953, Hochhauser was the first impresario to organise tours of the West by Soviet musicians, and introduced audiences to David Oistrakh, Mstislav Rostropovich, Emil Gilels, Sviatoslav Richter, and Gennady Rozhdestvensky. Dmitri Shostakovich was a house guest. Hochhauser has said, "My great stroke of luck came when Stalin died". He and his wife Lilian were called "Britain's foremost independent promoters of classical music and ballet".

== Honours ==
Hochhauser was appointed Commander of the Order of the British Empire in 1993.

In June 2010, the Hochhausers were presented with the Order of Friendship by Russia.

== Personal life ==
He met his future wife Lilian Shields, born in Britain to Russian-Jewish parents, when they were both working for Rabbi Dr Solomon Schonfeld in London. Lilian was also appointed a Commander of the Order of the British Empire in 2018. They married in 1949 and had four children, including the diplomat Mark Sofer. Hochhauser was a vegetarian.

Hochhauser died on 22 March 2019 in a London hospital.
