= Mishkenot Sha'ananim =

First Jewish neighbourhood built outside of the Old City walls in Jerusalem

Coordinates: 31°46′17.05″N 35°13′27.65″E

Mishkenot Sha'ananim Hebrew: משכנות שאננים
- Neighborhood of Jerusalem
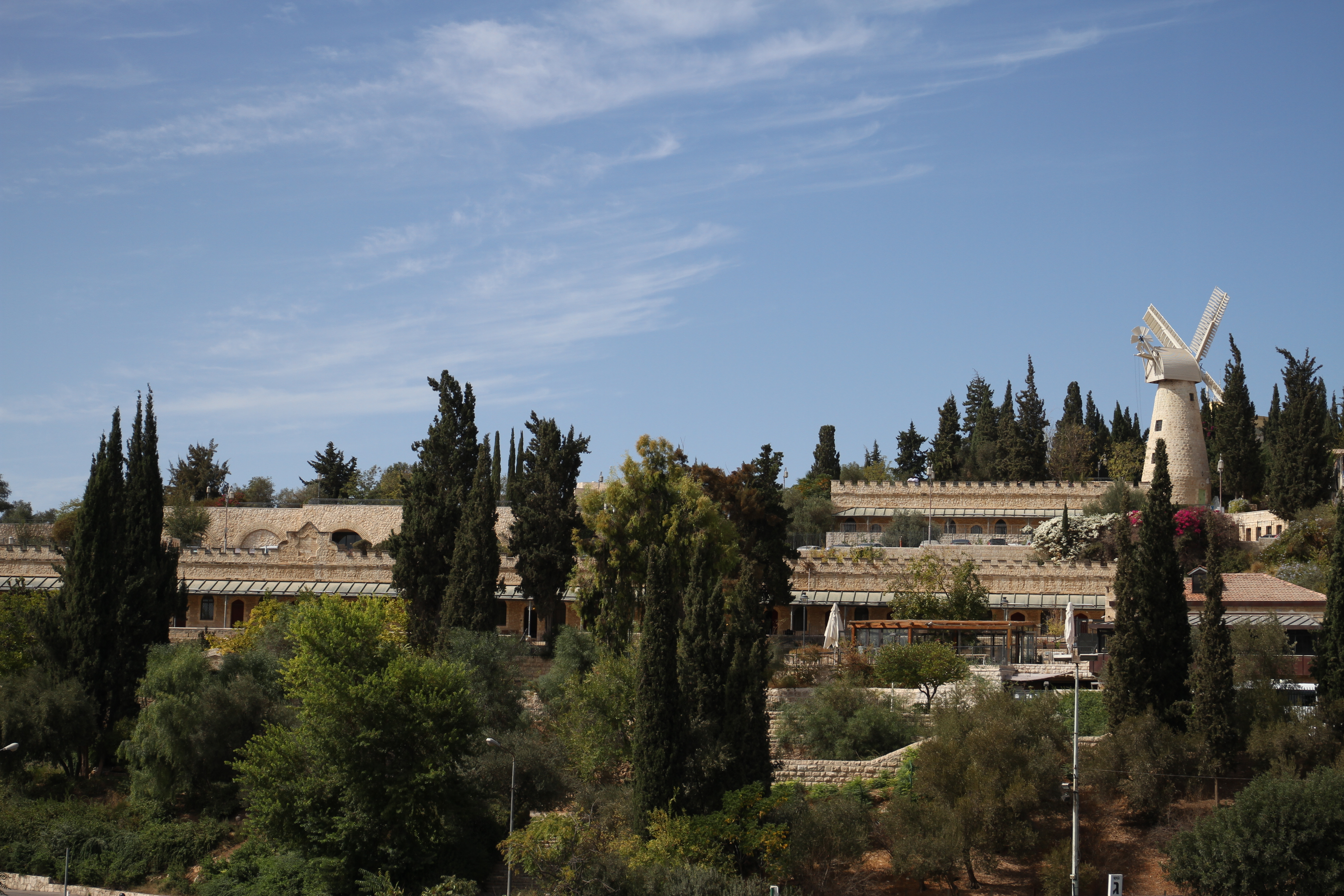
- View of Mishkenot Sha'ananim from the Old City of Jerusalem
- Interactive map of Mishkenot Sha'ananim
- Country: Israel
- District: Jerusalem District
- City: Jerusalem
- Founded: 1860
- Founder: Sir Moses Montefiore

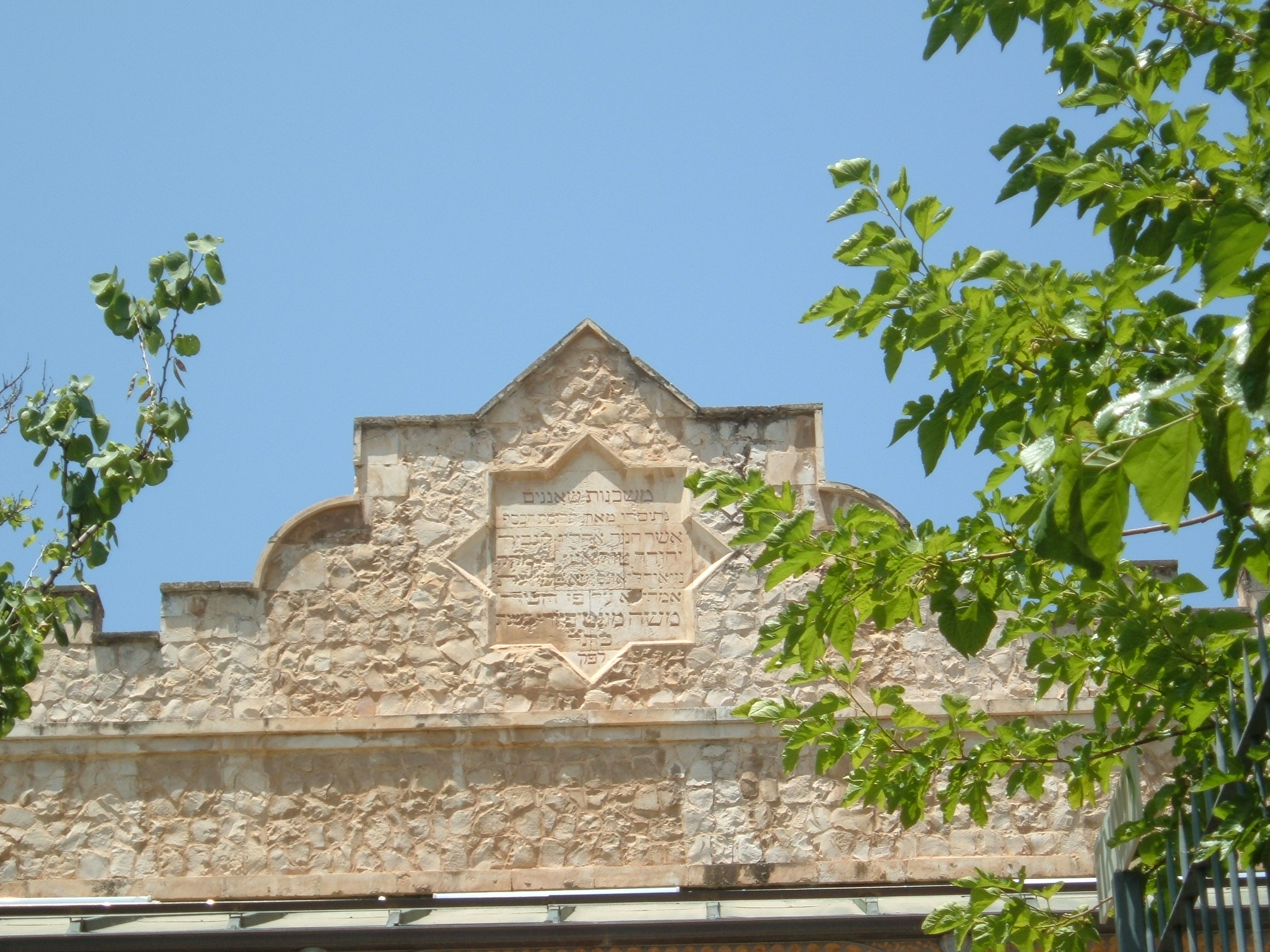
Mishkenot Sha'ananim neighborhood plaque

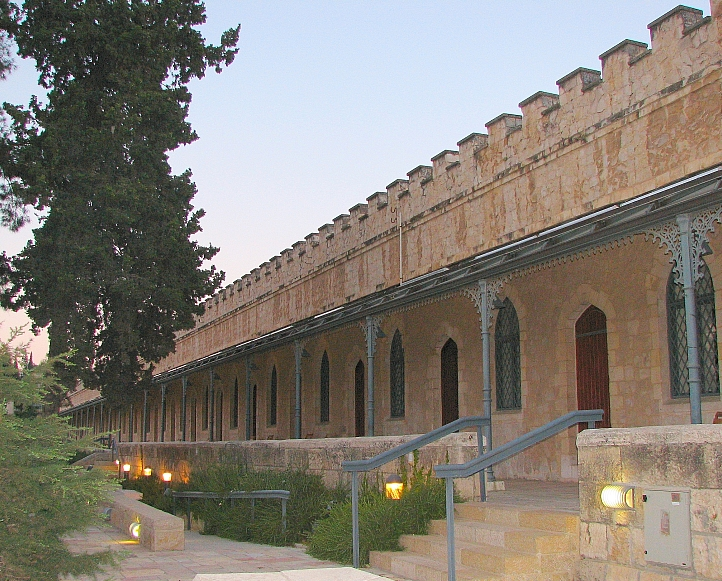
Mishkenot Sha'ananim guesthouse, restored historical building

Mishkenot Sha'ananim (Hebrew: משכנות שאננים, lit. Peaceful Dwellings) was the first Jewish settlement built outside the walls of the Old City of Jerusalem, on a hill directly across Mount Zion. It was built in 1859–1860. This guesthouse was one of the first structures to be built outside the Old City, the others being Kerem Avraham, the Schneller Orphanage, Bishop Gobat school, and the Russian Compound.

== History ==
=== Ottoman period ===
Mishkenot Sha'ananim was built by British Jewish banker and philanthropist Sir Moses Montefiore in 1860, after he acquired the land from the Governor of Jerusalem, Ahmad Agha Duzdar. It was built as an almshouse, paid for by the estate of an American Jewish businessman from New Orleans, Judah Touro. The bequest, variously reported as $50,000 or $60,000, was left in trust to Sir Moses Montefiore for the relief of the Jewish poor of Jerusalem, and an inscription on the building's façade recorded that it "was established with the money bequeathed by the benefactor Judah Touro... by Sir Moses Montefiore". American observers later noted that Touro's role, and that of his executor Gershom Kursheedt, had been largely forgotten in favor of Montefiore.

On the night of 1 January 1873, Aaron Hershler was standing guard at the Montefiore Windmill, when a group of Arab Muslims from Silwan attempted to rob his family's home in Mishkenot Sha'ananim. Hershler took chase and was shot 12 times. He died in the hospital on 5 January and was buried on the Mount of Olives. Seventy-five years after his death, Hershler was recognized by the Israel Defense Forces as the first "national martyr" in the Jewish-Arab conflict. He is one of approximately three dozen Jews killed during Ottoman-ruled Palestine, who are commemorated as part of Israeli's annual Yom Hazikaron memorial day.

Since it was outside the walls and open to Bedouin raids, pillage and general banditry rampant in the region at the time, the Jews were reluctant to move in, even though the housing was luxurious compared to the derelict and overcrowded houses in the Old City. As an incentive, people were paid to live there, and a stone wall was built around the compound with a heavy door that was locked at night for defense. The name of the neighborhood was taken from the Book of Isaiah: "My people will abide in peaceful habitation, in secure dwellings and in peaceful resting places" (Isaiah 32:18). It later became part of Yemin Moshe, which was established in 1892–1894.

=== Jordanian period ===
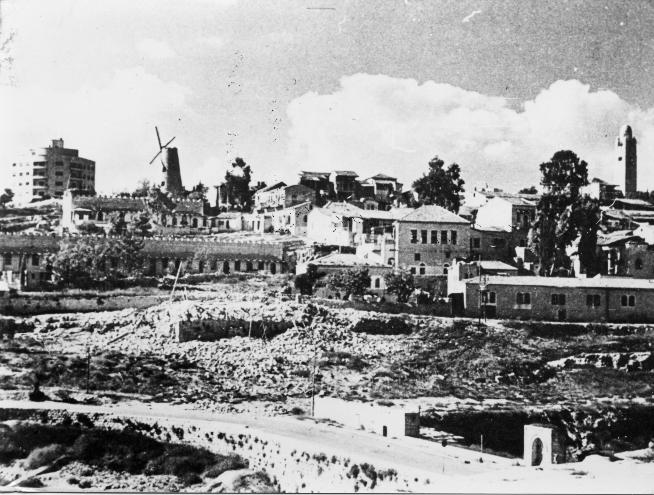
Montefiore Quarter – Mishkenot Sha'ananim 1948

After the 1948 Arab–Israeli War, when the Old City was captured by the Arab Legion, Mishkenot Sha'ananim bordered on no man's land in proximity to the armistice line with the Kingdom of Jordan, and many residents of the Yemin Moshe quarter left in the wake of sniper attacks by Jordanian Arab Legionnaires. Only the poorest inhabitants remained, turning the complex into a slum.

=== Restoration after 1967 ===
The no-man's-land bordering Mishkenot Sha'ananim was captured by Israel during the 1967 War, together with the rest of Eastern and Old Jerusalem.

In 1973, Mishkenot Sha'ananim was turned into an upscale guesthouse for internationally acclaimed authors, artists and musicians visiting Israel. Apart from guesthouse facilities, it is now a convention center and home of the Jerusalem Music Center. The music center was inaugurated by Pablo Casals shortly before his death.

The Jerusalem Center for Ethics was established in Mishkenot Sha'ananim in 1997. Yitzhak Zamir has been heading the board of directors since his retirement as justice of the Israeli Supreme Court in 2001.

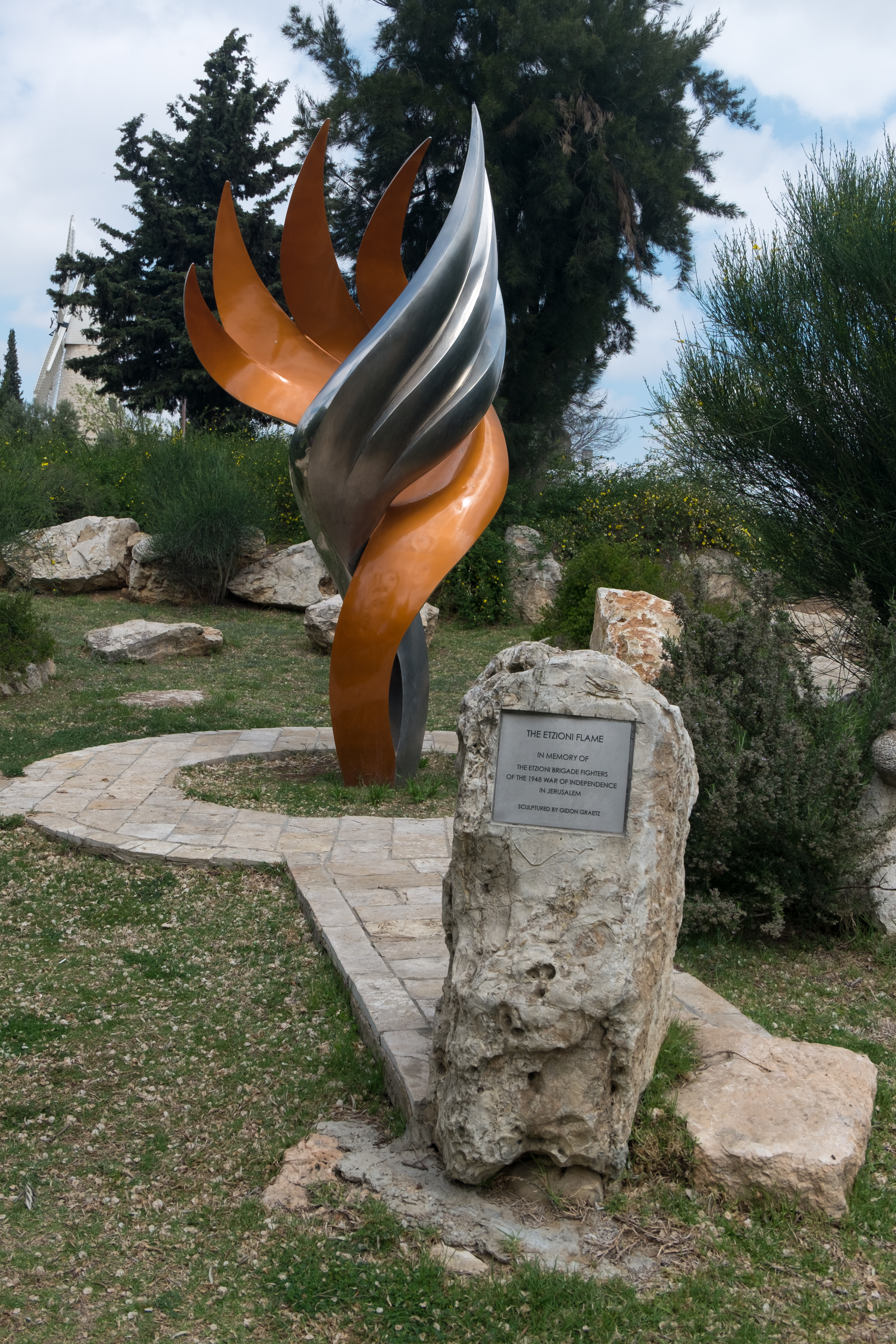
Etzioni Flame

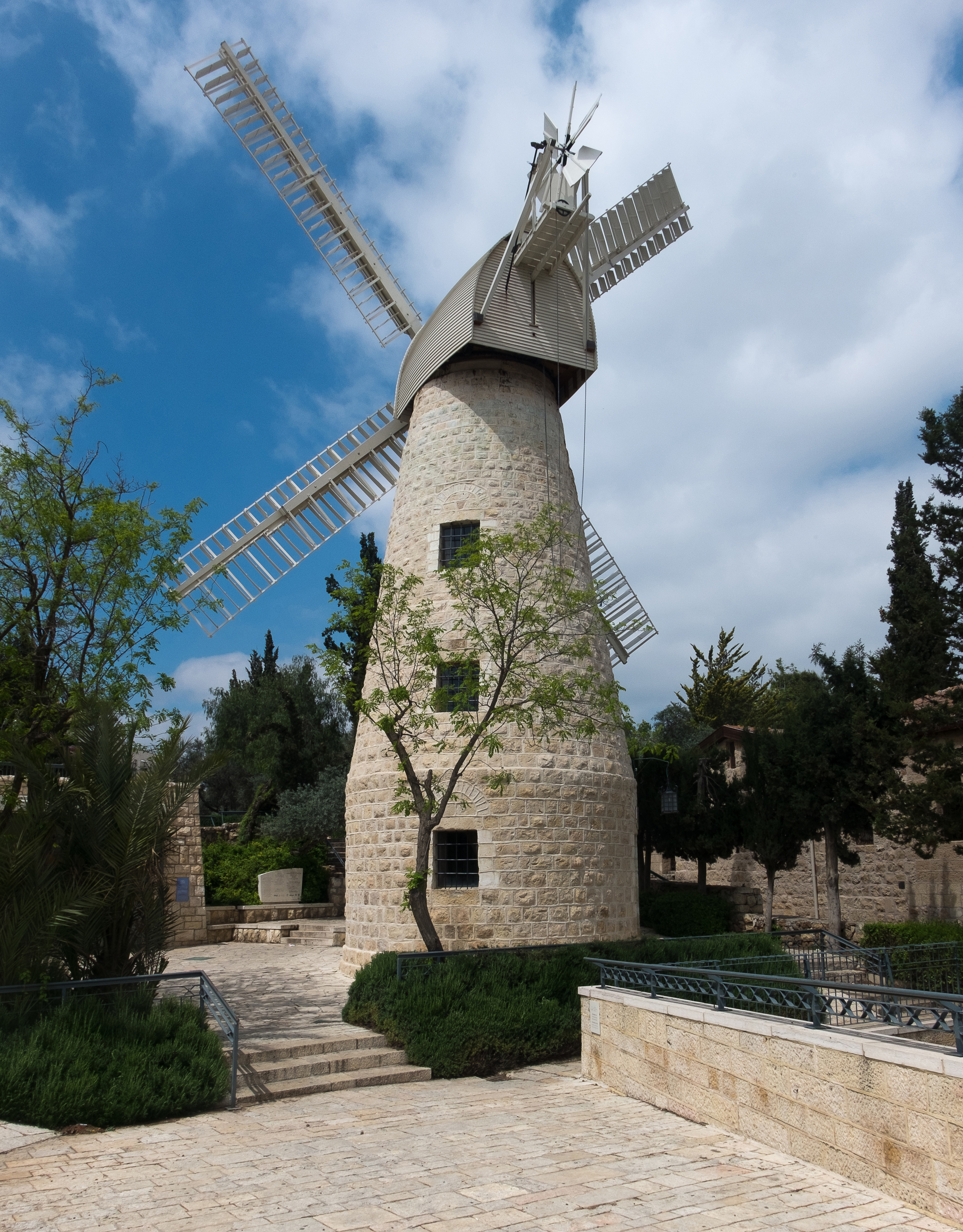
Montefiore Windmill

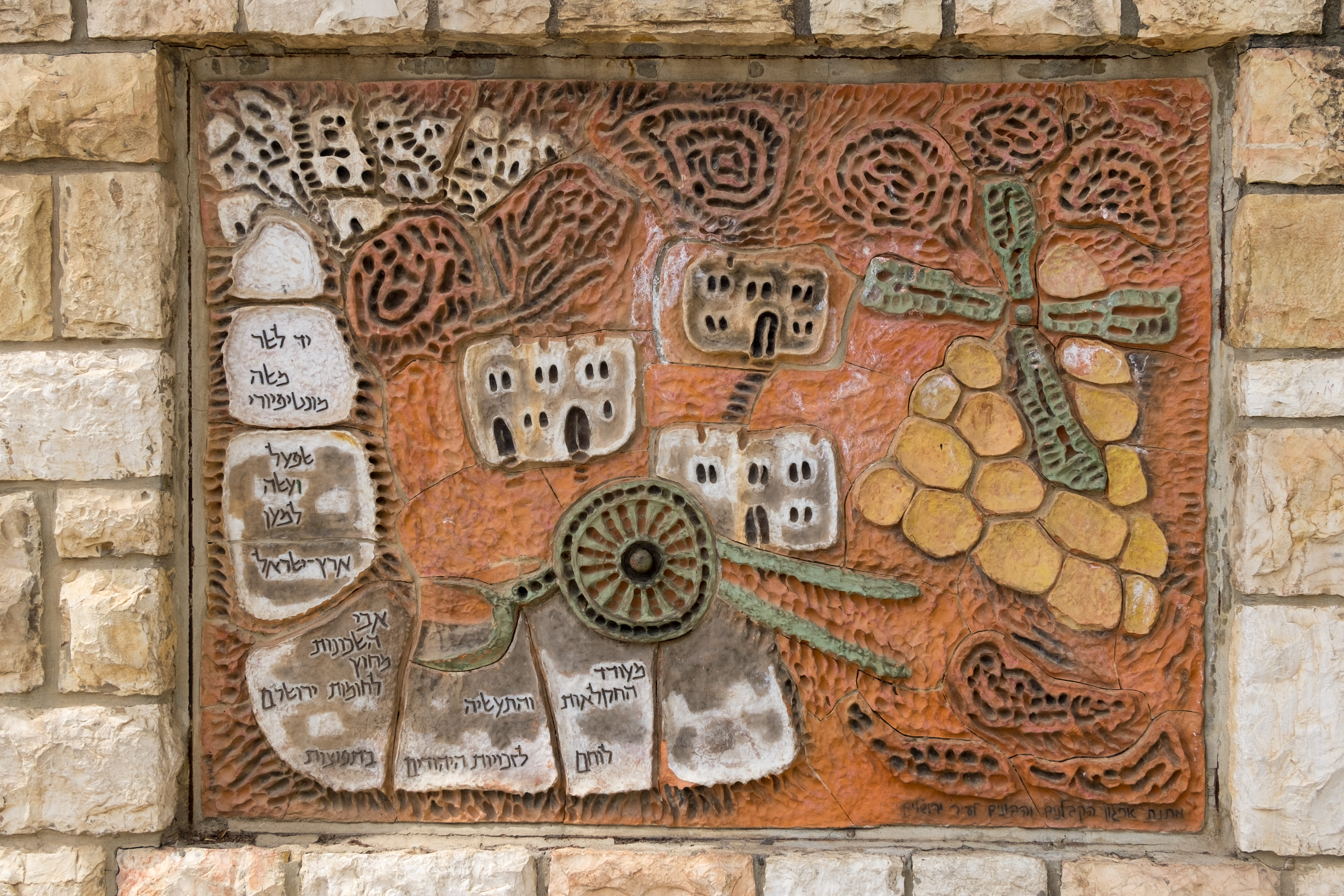
Ha-Takhana

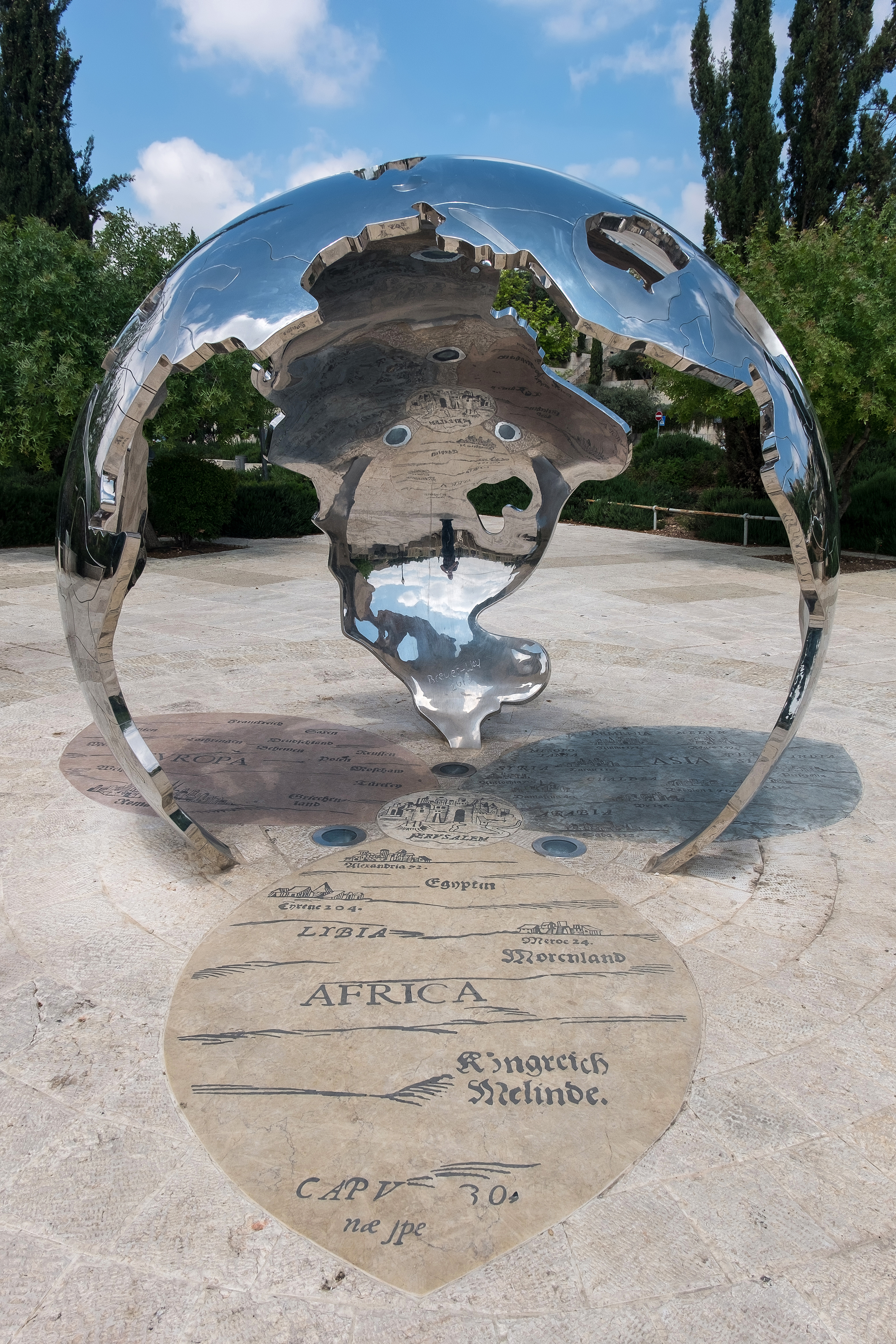
Jerusalem as the Center of the World by David Breuer-Weil (after the Bünting Clover Leaf Map), in Teddy Kollek Park (2016)

== See also ==
- Yemin Moshe
- Mea Shearim
- Montefiore Windmill
- Statue of Winston Churchill, Mishkenot Sha’ananim
- Mishkenot Shaananim International Writers Festival
- Expansion of Jerusalem in the 19th century
