= Aaron Hershler =

Hungarian-Jew (1859–1873)

Aaron Hershler (Hebrew: אהרון הרשלר) (1850 – 5 January 1873) was a Hungarian-born Jew considered the first national Jewish martyr in the Jewish–Arab conflict. While attempting to intervene in a robbery at his family's home in Mishkenot Sha'ananim, the first Jewish neighborhood outside the walls of the Old City of Jerusalem, Hershler was shot 12 times, dying 5 days later.

== Biography ==
Hershler was a Haredi Orthodox Jew born in Hungary in 1850 to Hana and Yosef Shmuel Hershler, a prominent rabbi who later was a rosh yeshiva after the family immigrated to what was then Ottoman-ruled Palestine. By 1873, he was a 23-year-old student at the Kollel Shomrei HaChomos and had a wife and a daughter.

On the night of 1 January 1873, Hershler was standing guard at the Montefiore Windmill, a landmark windmill in Jerusalem, when a group of Arab Muslims from Silwan attempted to rob his family's home in Mishkenot Sha'ananim, the first Jewish neighborhood outside the walls of the Old City of Jerusalem. Hershler took chase and was shot 12 times. He died in the hospital on 5 January and was buried on the Mount of Olives.

Due to heavy rains in 1872, the poor Jewish residents in Mishkenot Sha'ananim did not have to purchase water from the Arabs in Silwan. As a result, there had been numerous complaints about thefts perpetrated by local Arab farmers against Jews.

== Legacy ==
Seventy-five years after his death, Hershler was recognized by the Israel Defense Forces as the first "national martyr" in the Jewish–Arab conflict. He is one of approximately three dozen Jews killed during Ottoman-ruled Palestine, who are commemorated as part of Israeli's annual Yom Hazikaron memorial day.

Ahead of Israel's memorial day, the company that manages the Montefiore Windmill placed its sails in the mourning position, with the bottom sail pointing down and angled to the right.
