= Mark Sofer =

Israeli diplomat

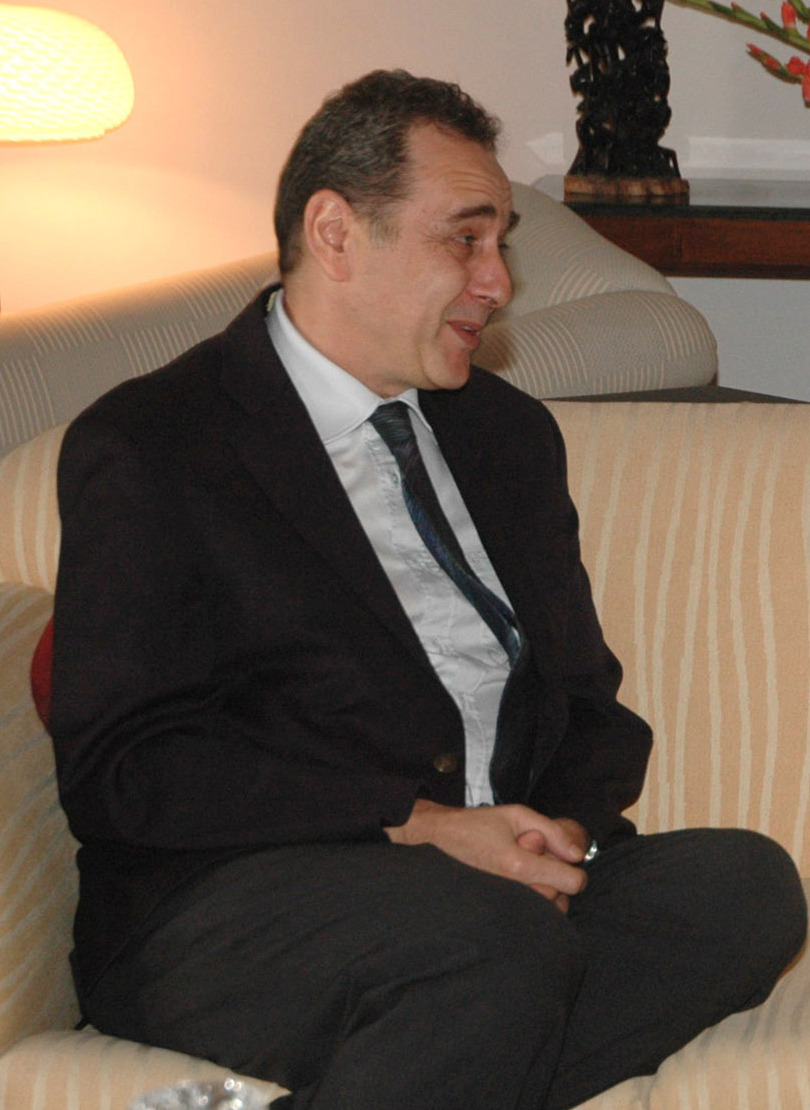
- Sofer in 2008

Israeli Ambassador to Australia
- In office 2017–2020

Deputy Director General, Israel Ministry of Foreign Affairs
- In office 2014–2017

President of the Jerusalem Foundation
- In office 2011–2014

Israeli Ambassador to India
- In office 2008–2011

Israeli Ambassador to Ireland
- In office 1999–2002
- Preceded by: Zvi Gabay
- Succeeded by: Daniel Megiddo

Personal details
- Born: Mark Hochhauser; 1954 (age 71–72) London, England
- Parent(s): Victor Hochhauser; Lilian Hochhauser (née Shields)
- Relatives: Daniel Hochhauser (brother)
- Education: London School of Economics; Hebrew University
- Occupation: Diplomat

Mark Sofer (born 1954) is an Israeli diplomat.

== Early life and education ==
Sofer was born in London in 1954, the son of Victor Hochhauser and Lilian Hochhauser (née Shields). He holds a B.Sc. in economics and international relations from the London School of Economics, and an MA in international relations from the Hebrew University.

== Career ==
In 1981 Sofer joined the Israeli Foreign Ministry. He has held diplomatic positions in Peru, Norway, and New York City. He served as ambassador to Ireland from 1999-2002. He was policy adviser to Foreign Minister Shimon Peres in the early 1990s.

In 2008 Sofer became the Israeli ambassador to India and concurrently, non-resident ambassador to Sri Lanka.

Following his tenure in India, in 2017 Sofer took up the top diplomatic role in Australia.

== Ambassadorial tenure in India ==
Under Sofer's tenure as ambassador of India, the ties between India and Israel improved further. According to BS Brar, professor of political theory and international relations at Punjab University, Chandigarh, "With regard to foreign relations, our approach was rather ideological a few decades ago, so we kept a distance from countries like Israel. But gradually, India's approach is getting more pragmatic in nature, and so we have opened up to Israel, and that's a good sign."

Sofer is credited with pioneering efforts to reach out Muslims in India. On September 3, 2008, he offered a chaddar at the dargah of Khwaja Moinuddhin Chisthi at Ajmer. The visit of the ambassador was the first visit by any official of Israel to dargah in history. Talking to media persons, he said that only Sufism can help to solve problems and which can help us to grow together. "Judaism and Islam are basically sister religions and both teach us love and peace. The sufi is found in both religions and even the kabbalah system is found in Judaism," he said. He also referred to some Muslim countries, which have recognised Israel and have established diplomatic relations with Jerusalem.

As regards to Israel entering into diplomatic ties with Pakistan, Sofer said that 'the day Pakistan says it wants closer relations with Israel we will be ready to respond. Our close relationship with India is a fact and it is on the table. We will not compromise this relationship for anyone else. These relations are not aimed against any third country.'
