= Cancer and its Management =

Medical textbook

- 6th edition cover
- Author: Jeffrey S. Tobias, Daniel Hochhauser
- Language: English
- Publisher: Blackwell Publishing
- Publication date: 1986 (1st edition); 2014 (7th edition)
- Publication place: UK
- Pages: 544; 608 (7th edition)
- ISBN: 9781118468739

Cancer and its Management is a medical textbook, first published in 1986 by Blackwell Publishing. It was first authored by Jeffrey S. Tobias, and Robert L. Souhami, who was later replaced by Daniel Hochhauser.
