= Heinrich Bünting =

German pastor and cartographer (1545–1606)

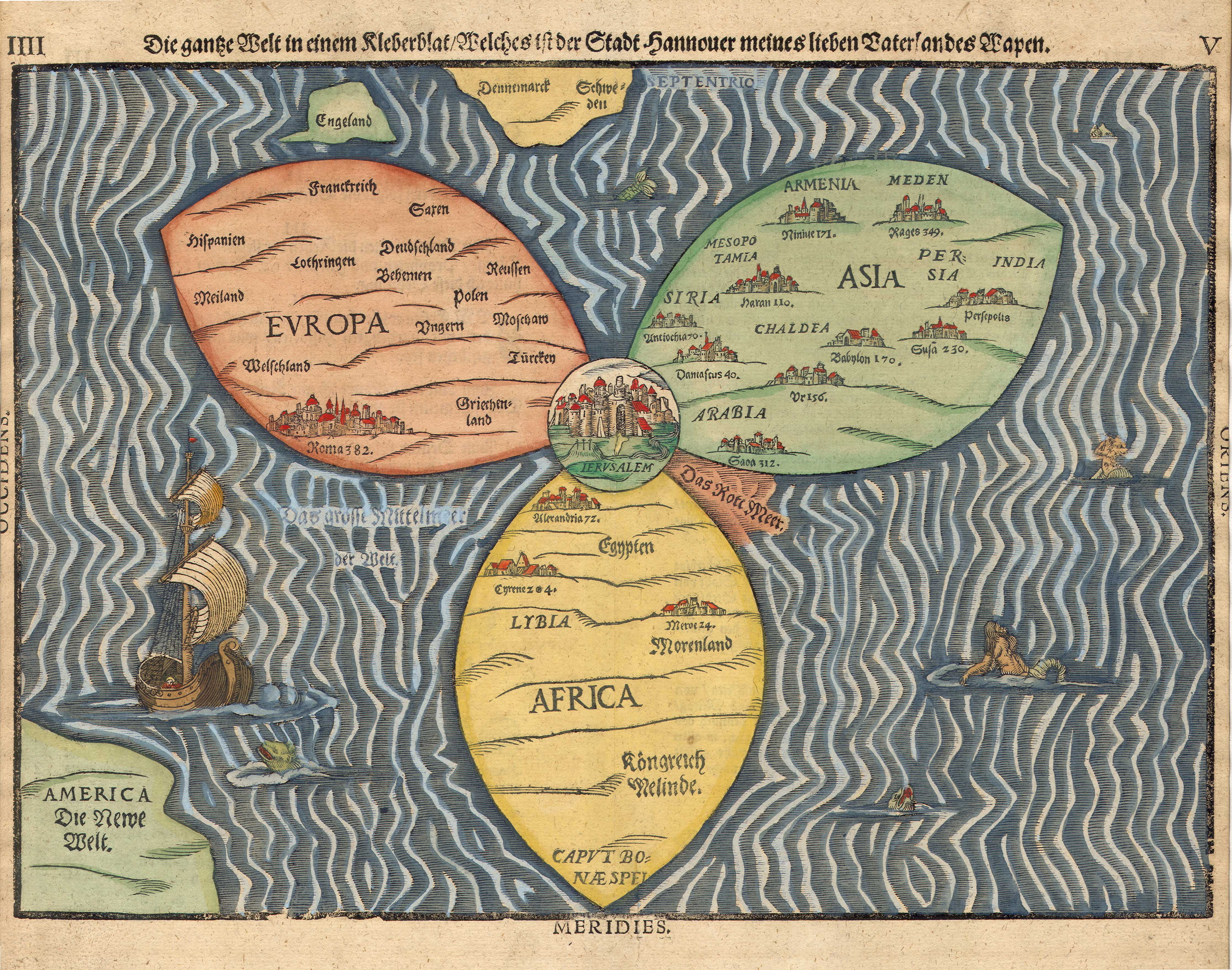
Bünting's world map. Made to look like a clover leaf. The coat of arms of his hometown of Hannover

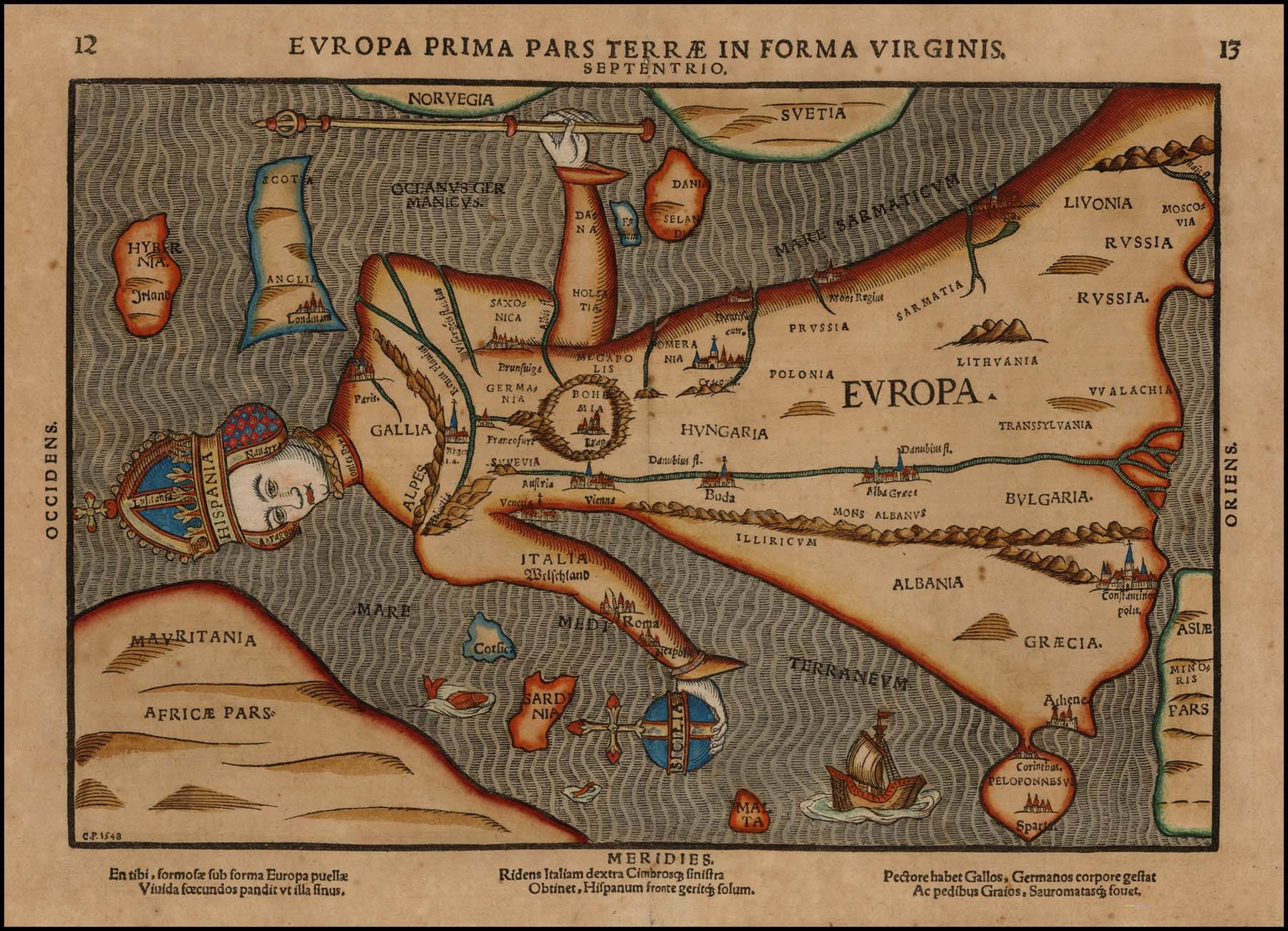
Bünting's map of Europe

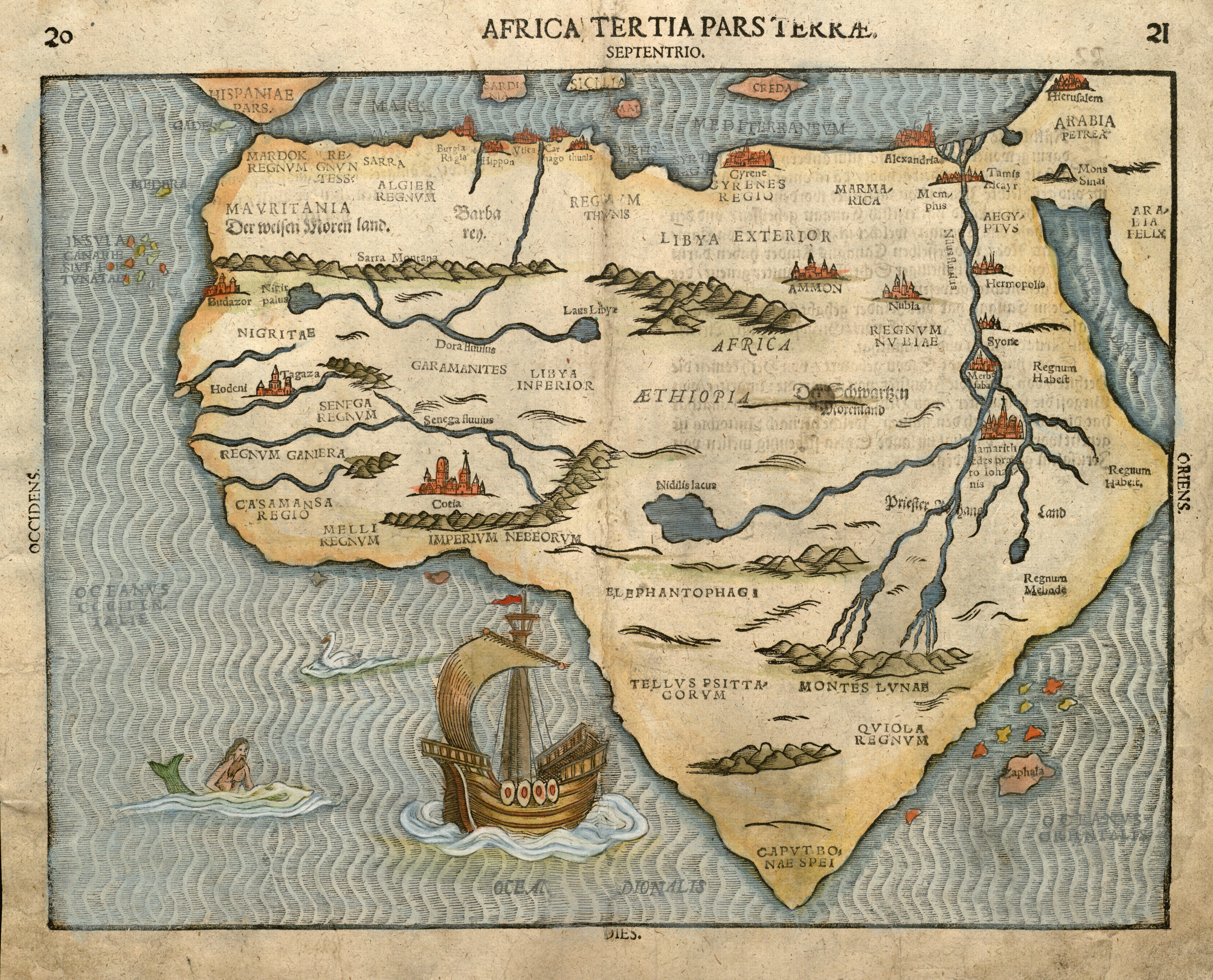
Bünting's map of Africa

Heinrich Bünting (1545 – 30 December 1606) was a German Protestant pastor and theologian. He is best known for his book of woodcut maps titled Itinerarium Sacrae Scripturae (Travel book through Holy Scripture) first published in 1581.

== Life ==
Bünting was born in Hannover, Germany, in 1545. He studied theology at the University of Wittenberg graduating in 1569 and became a Protestant pastor in Lemgo. He was dismissed in 1575 and moved to Gronau an der Leine. In 1591 he was appointed superintendent in Goslar. When a dispute arose over his teachings in 1600 he was dismissed and retired from the ministry. He spent the rest of his life as a private citizen in Hannover.

Bünting died on 30 December 1606.

== Itinerarium Sacrae Scripturae ==
His collection of woodcut maps, Itinerarium Sacrae Scripturae, first published in Magdeburg in 1581, was a very popular book in its day. It was reprinted and translated several times. The book provided the most complete summary of biblical geography available and described the Holy Land by following the travels of various notable people from the Old and New Testaments. In addition to conventional maps, the book also contained three figurative maps; the world depicted using a cloverleaf design in honor of Bünting's home city of Hanover, Europe in the form of a crowned and robed woman, and Asia as the winged horse Pegasus.
