= Informed Consent in Medical Research =

Medical textbook on Medical ethics

- Author: Jeffrey S. Tobias, Len Doyal
- Language: English
- Publisher: Wiley
- Publication date: 2001
- Publication place: UK
- ISBN: 978-0-727-91486-6

Informed Consent in Medical Research is a medical textbook on medical ethics, authored by Jeffrey S. Tobias and Len Doyal, and published by Wiley in 2001. It was produced in response to the debates between the authors in 1997, following the response to the 1990's British Medical Journal publications of studies in which consent was not obtained by participants. Topics in the book include the Nuremberg Code, Declaration of Helsinki, and the role of Henry K. Beecher and Maurice Pappworth in developing modern ethics in research.
