= Daniel Hochhauser =

British oncologist

- Born: 18 July 1957 (age 69)
- Education: University of Cambridge; University of Oxford
- Occupation: Medical oncologist
- Title: Kathleen Ferrier Professor at University College London
- Parent(s): Victor Hochhauser; Lilian Hochhauser (née Shields)
- Scientific career
- Thesis: Transcriptional regulation of topoisomerase II (1993)

Daniel Hochhauser (born 18 July 1957) is a British oncologist, and Kathleen Ferrier Professor of Medical Oncology at University College London.

== Early life ==
Daniel Hochhauser was born on 18 July 1957, the son of the impresarios Lilian and Victor Hochhauser. He is also a direct descendant of famed Judaic scholar the Chatam Sofer.

He earned a bachelor's degree from the University of Cambridge in 1979, an MBBS in Medicine from the Royal Free University College Medical School in 1983, an MRCP from the Royal College of Physicians in 1986, and a DPhil from the University of Oxford in 1993.

== Career ==
Hochhauser completed his specialist training at the Memorial Sloan-Kettering Cancer Center in New York City, where he worked as a medical oncology fellow before his appointment as a consultant in 1996.

He is co-author of Cancer and its Management.

== Publications ==
Hochhauser's major clinical interest is in gastrointestinal medical oncology and his research is focused on development of early phase clinical trials.

- Hochhauser, D.; Glynne-Jones, R.; Potter, V.; Gravalos, C.; Doyle, T. J.; Pathiraja, K.; Zhang, Q.; Zhang, L.; Sausville, E. A. (2013). "A Phase II Study of Temozolomide in Patients with Advanced Aerodigestive Tract and Colorectal Cancers and Methylation of the O6-Methylguanine-DNA Methyltransferase Promoter". Molecular Cancer Therapeutics. 12 (5): 809–818. doi:10.1158/1535-7163.mct-12-0710. PMID 23443801.
- Liccardi, G.; Hartley, J. A.; Hochhauser, D. (2011). "EGFR Nuclear Translocation Modulates DNA Repair following Cisplatin and Ionizing Radiation Treatment". Cancer Research. 71 (3): 1103–1114. doi:10.1158/0008-5472.can-10-2384. PMC 3033323. PMID 21266349.
- Hochhauser, D.; Kotecha, M.; O'Hare, C.; Morris, P. J.; Hartley, J. M.; Taherbhai, Z.; Harris, D.; Forni, C.; Mantovani, R.; Lee, M.; Hartley, J. A. (2007). "Modulation of topoisomerase II expression by a DNA sequence-specific polyamide" (PDF). Molecular Cancer Therapeutics. 6 (1): 346–354. doi:10.1158/1535-7163.mct-06-0503. PMID 17237293. Archived from the original (PDF) on 6 August 2024.
- Hochhauser, D.; Schnieders, B.; Ercikan-Abali, E.; Gorlick, R.; Muise-Helmericks, R.; Li, W.-W.; Fan, J.; Banerjee, D.; Bertino, J. R. (1996). "Effect of Cyclin D1 Overexpression on Drug Sensitivity in a Human Fibrosarcoma Cell Line". Journal of the National Cancer Institute. 88 (18): 1269–1275. doi:10.1093/jnci/88.18.1269. PMID 8797766.
