= Jeffrey S. Tobias =

British professor

- Occupation: Physician
- Medical career
- Institutions: University College, London
- Notable works: Informed Consent in Medical Research (2000); Cancer and its Management (2014)

Jeffrey S. Tobias is a British professor of oncology at University College, London, and co-author of Cancer and its Management and Informed Consent in Medical Research. He is on the board at Cancer Research UK, and is a former president of the British Association for Head and Neck Oncology.

== Selected publications ==
=== Books ===
- Informed Consent in Medical Research. Wiley. 2000. ISBN 978-0-7279-1486-6. (Co-author)
- Living with cancer : symptoms, diagnosis and treatments. London: Bloomsbury. 2001. ISBN 0747554102. (Co-author)
- Individualized Medicine: Ethical, Economical and Historical Perspectives. Springer. 2015. ISBN 978-3-319-11719-5. (Co-author)
- Cancer and its Management (7th ed.). Wiley. 2014. ISBN 978-1-118-46873-9.

=== Articles ===
- Tobias, J. S.; Souhami, R. L. (6 November 1993). "Fully informed consent can be needlessly cruel". BMJ. 307 (6913): 1199–1201. doi:10.1136/bmj.307.6913.1199. PMC 1679294. PMID 8135933. (Co-author)
- Vaidya, Jayant S.; Baum, Michael; Tobias, Jeffrey S.; Wenz, Frederik; Massarut, Samuele; Keshtgar, Mohammed; Hilaris, Basil; Saunders, Christobel; Williams, Norman R.; Brew-Graves, Chris; Corica, Tammy; Roncadin, Mario; Kraus-Tiefenbacher, Uta; Sütterlin, Marc; Bulsara, Max; Joseph, David (15 November 2011). "Long-term results of targeted intraoperative radiotherapy (Targit) boost during breast-conserving surgery". International Journal of Radiation Oncology, Biology, Physics. 81 (4): 1091–1097. doi:10.1016/j.ijrobp.2010.07.1996. ISSN 1879-355X. PMID 20951505. (Co-author)
- Vaidya, Jayant S.; Joseph, David J.; Tobias, Jeffrey S.; Bulsara, Max; Wenz, Frederik; Saunders, Christobel; Alvarado, Michael; Flyger, Henrik L.; Massarut, Samuele; Eiermann, Wolfgang; Keshtgar, Mohammed; Dewar, John; Kraus-Tiefenbacher, Uta; Sütterlin, Marc; Esserman, Laura; Holtveg, Helle MR; Roncadin, Mario; Pigorsch, Steffi; Metaxas, Marinos; Falzon, Mary; Matthews, April; Corica, Tammy; Williams, Norman R.; Baum, Michael (July 2010). "Targeted intraoperative radiotherapy versus whole breast radiotherapy for breast cancer (TARGIT-A trial): an international, prospective, randomised, non-inferiority phase 3 trial". The Lancet. 376 (9735): 91–102. doi:10.1016/S0140-6736(10)60837-9. PMID 20570343. (Co-author)
- Vaidya, Jayant S.; Tobias, Jeffrey S.; Baum, Michael; Keshtgar, Mohammed; Joseph, David; Wenz, Frederik; Houghton, Joan; Saunders, Christobel; Corica, Tammy; d'Souza, Derek; Sainsbury, Richard; Massarut, Samuele; Taylor, Irving; Hilaris, Basil (March 2004). "Intraoperative radiotherapy for breast cancer". The Lancet Oncology. 5 (3): 165–173. doi:10.1016/S1470-2045(04)01412-3. PMID 15003199. (Co-author)
