= Bünting cloverleaf map =

Late 16th century figurative illustrative map of the world

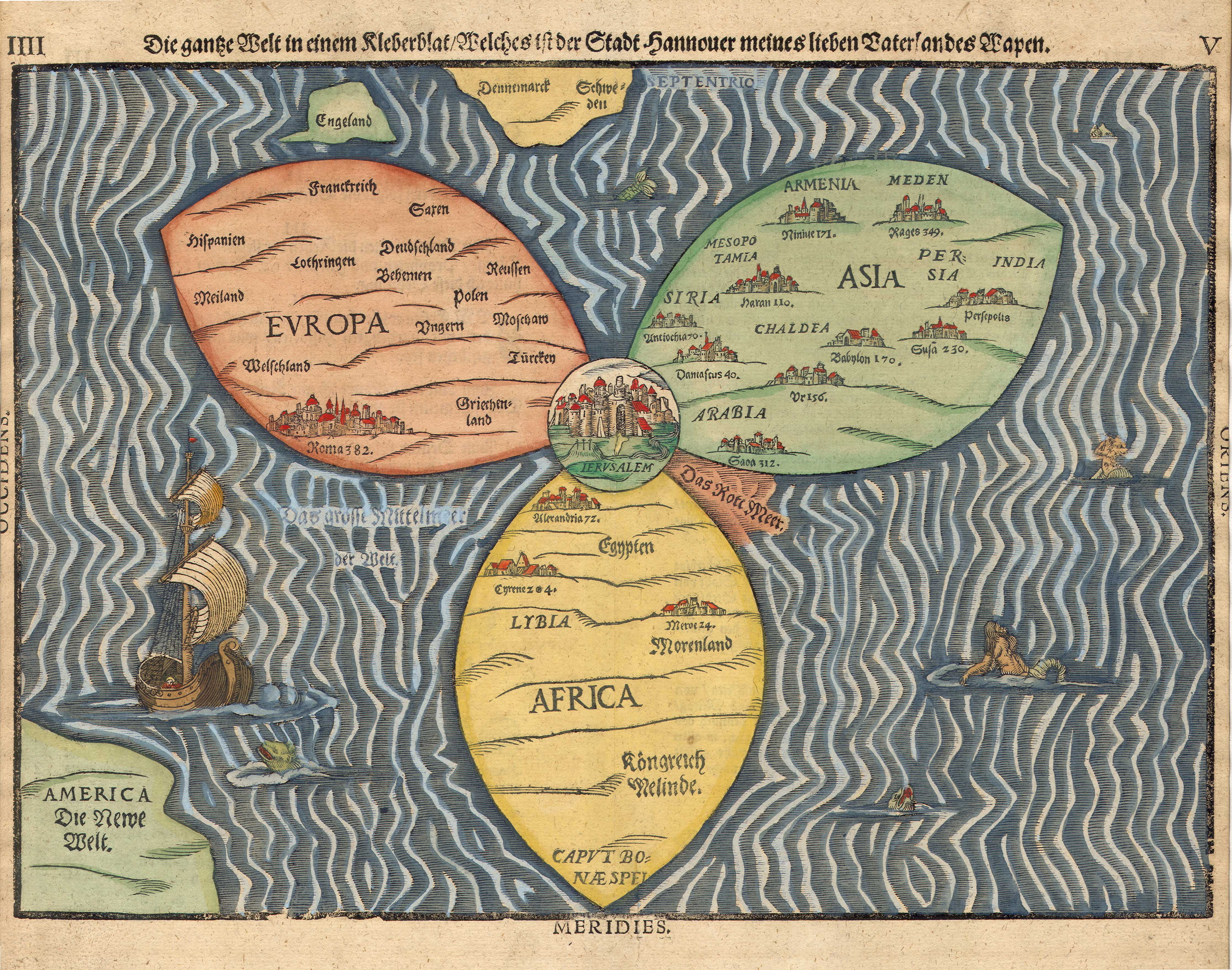
Die ganze Welt in einem Kleberblat (The entire World in a Cloverleaf). Jerusalem is in the centre of the map surrounded by the three continents.

The Bünting cloverleaf map, also known as The World in a Cloverleaf, (German title: "Die ganze Welt in einem Kleberblat/Welches ist der Stadt Hannover meines lieben Vaterlandes Wapen") is a historic mappa mundi drawn by the German Protestant pastor, theologian, and cartographer Heinrich Bünting. The map was published in his book Itinerarium Sacrae Scripturae (Travel Book of Holy Scripture) in 1581.

Today the map is found within the Eran Laor maps collection in the National Library of Israel in Jerusalem. A mosaic model of the map is installed on the fence of Safra Square at the site of Jerusalem's city hall.

The map is a figurative illustration, in the manner of the medieval mappa mundi format, depicting the world via a clover leaf shape. The shape honors Bünting's home city of Hanover, on whose coat of arms a clover leaf is depicted. The city of Jerusalem is represented as the centre, surrounded by three central continents, with some more areas of the world being accordingly illustrated separately from the clover.

== Description ==
The dimension of the map is 38 by 30 centimeters.

Jerusalem is in the centre of the map surrounded by the three continents of Europe, Africa, and Asia, comprising three leaves of a clover leaf shape. The top-left leaf shape coloured in red represents Europe, the bottom one coloured in yellow represents Africa, and the top-right one coloured in green represents Asia. The three continents include captions of their various countries and illustrations of some of their cities. Europe includes one illustration of the Italian city Rome, the continent of Africa includes illustrations of three cities with one being the Egyptian city of Alexandria, and Asia includes illustrations of nine cities.

The clover is surrounded by the ocean, with its surface including illustrations of sea creatures, monsters, and a ship. England and Denmark together with Sweden—as perhaps the tip of the entire Nordic countries—are represented as two island-shapes above Europe's leaf. The Red Sea is illustrated between Africa and Asia, painted in red. America is represented as a separating, mostly unrevealed shape at the lower left corner, coloured in green like Asia, with the caption Die Neue Welt (The New World).
