= Montefiore Windmill =

Landmark in Jerusalem

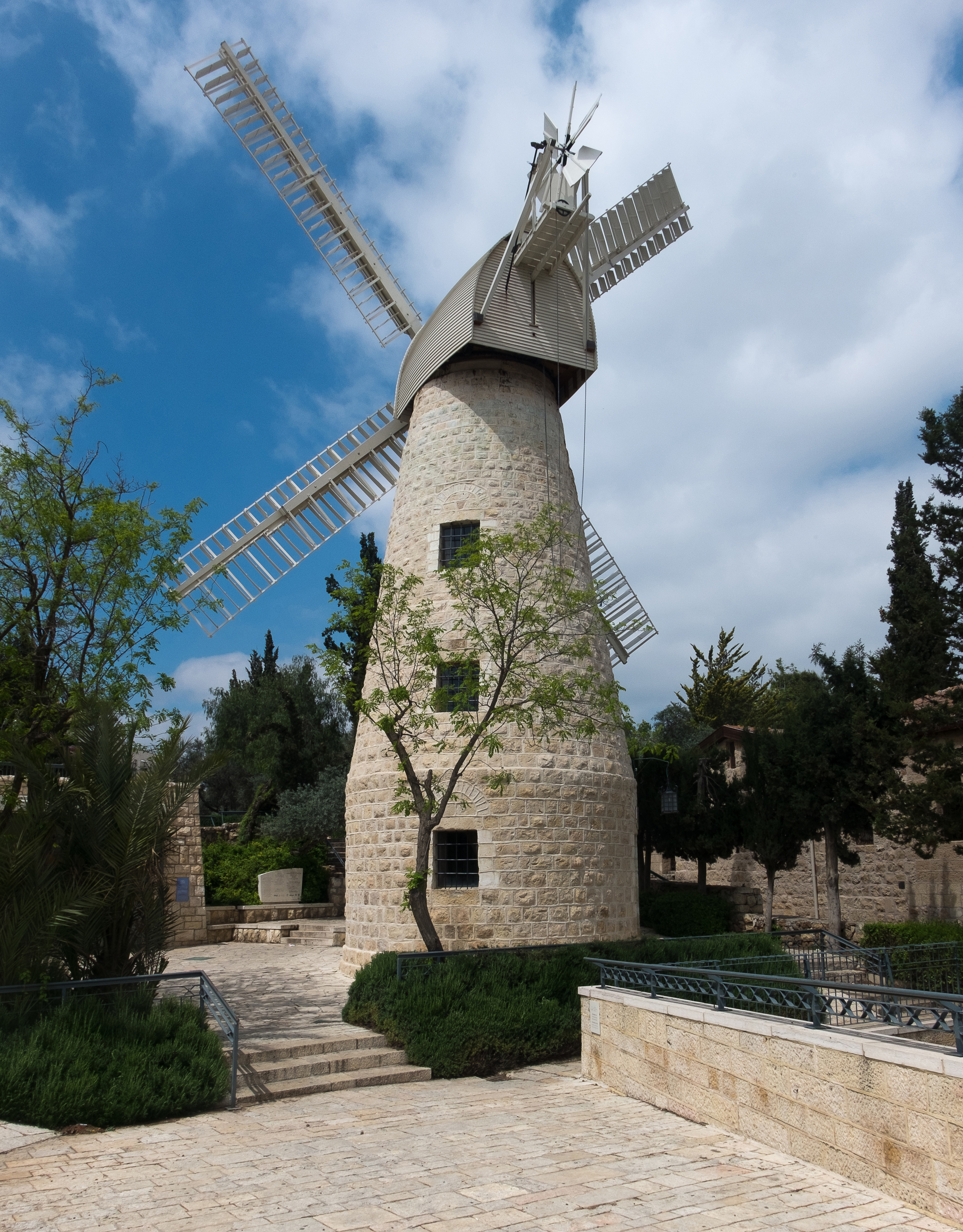
- Montefiore Windmill, 30 March 2016
- Interactive map of Montefiore Windmill

Origin
- Mill name: Montefiore Mill; Jaffa Gate Mill
- Mill location: Jerusalem
- Coordinates: 31°46′17.31″N 35°13′27.03″E
- Year built: 1857

Information
- Purpose: Flour mill
- Type: Tower mill
- Storeys: Four storeys
- No. of sails: Four sails
- Type of sails: Patent sails
- Windshaft: Cast iron
- Winding: Fantail
- Fantail blades: Six blades
- Auxiliary power: Electric motor
- No. of pairs of millstones: Two pairs

The Montefiore Windmill is a landmark windmill in Jerusalem. Designed as a flour mill, it was built in 1857 on a slope opposite the western city walls of Jerusalem, where three years later the new Jewish neighbourhood of Mishkenot Sha'ananim was erected, both by the efforts of British Jewish banker and philanthropist Moses Montefiore. Jerusalem at the time was part of Ottoman-ruled Palestine. Today the windmill serves as a small museum dedicated to the achievements of Montefiore. It was restored in 2012 with a new cap and sails in the style of the originals. The mill can turn in the wind.

== History ==
=== Ottoman era ===
The windmill and the neighbourhood of Mishkenot Sha'ananim were both funded by the British Jewish banker and philanthropist Moses Montefiore, who devoted his life to promoting industry, education and health in the Land of Israel. Montefiore built the windmill with funding from the estate of an American Jew, Judah Touro, who appointed Montefiore executor of his will. Montefiore mentions the windmill in his diaries (1875), noting that he had built it 18 years earlier on the estate of Kerem-Moshe-ve-Yehoodit (lit. "the orchard of Moses and Judith"), and that it had since been joined by two other windmills nearby, owned by Greeks. The project, bearing the hallmarks of nineteenth-century artisan revival, aimed to promote productive enterprise in the yishuv.

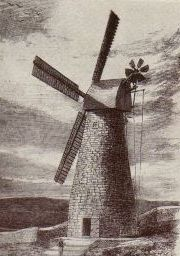
The mill in 1858

The mill was designed by Messrs Holman Brothers, the Canterbury, Kent, millwrights. The stone for the tower was quarried locally. The tower walls were 3 feet (0.91 m) thick at the base and almost 50 feet (15.24 m) high. Parts were shipped to Jaffa, where there were no suitable facilities for landing the heavy machinery. Transport of the machinery to Jerusalem had to be carried out by camel. In its original form, the mill had a Kentish-style cap and four patent sails. It was turned to face into the wind by a fantail. The mill drove two pairs of millstones, flour dressers, wheat cleaners and other machinery.

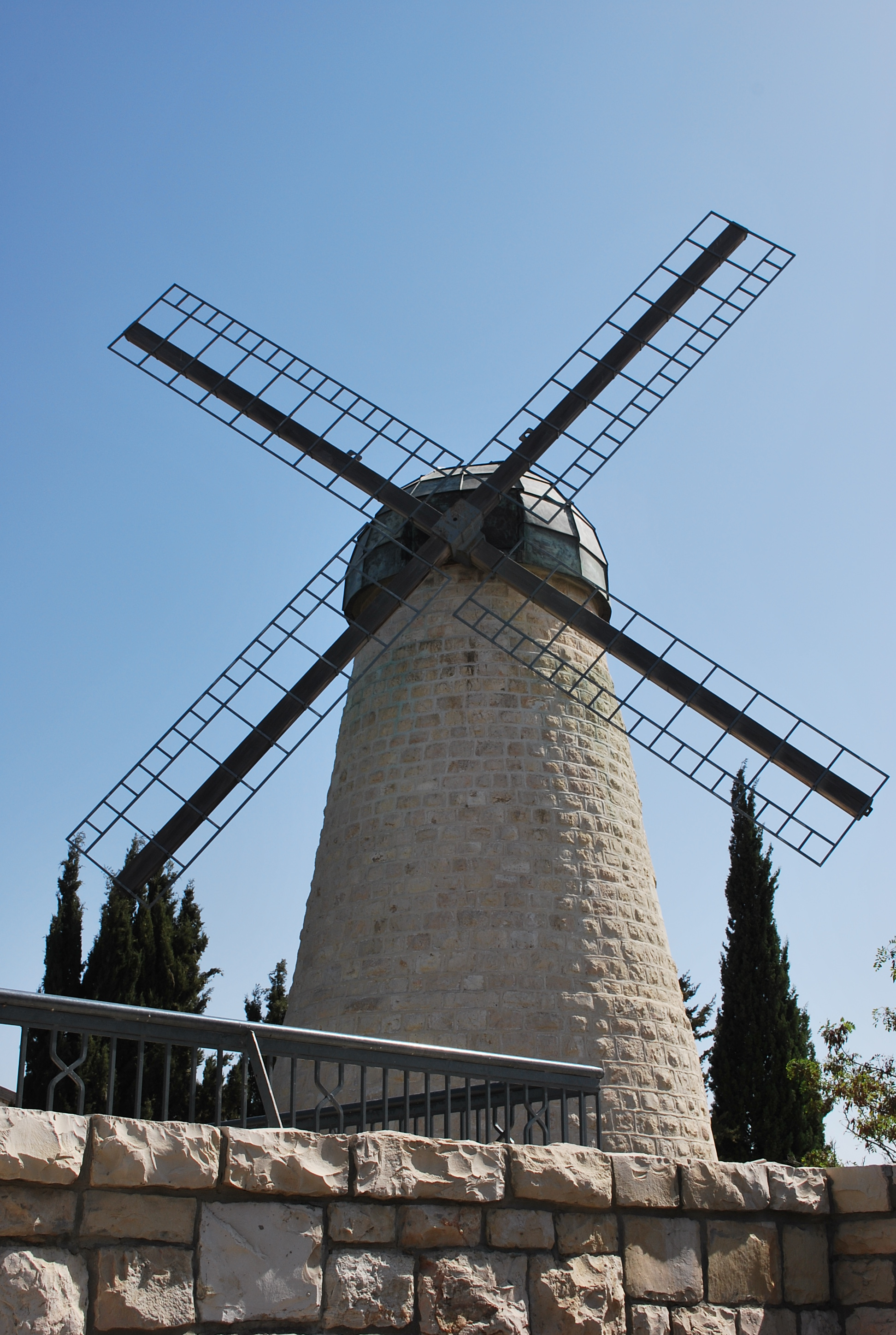
The mill as it appeared with decorative, non-functional sails and bronze cap prior to the 2012 restoration

The construction of the mill was part of a broader program to enable the Jews of Palestine to become self-supporting. Montefiore also built a printing press and a textile factory, and helped to finance several agricultural colonies. He attempted to acquire land for Jewish cultivation, but was hampered by Ottoman restrictions on land sale to non-Muslims.

On the night of 1 January 1873, Aaron Hershler was standing guard at the windmill, when a group of Arab Muslims from Silwan attempted to rob his family's home in Mishkenot Sha'ananim, the first Jewish neighborhood outside the walls of the Old City of Jerusalem. Hershler took chase and was shot 12 times. He died in the hospital on 5 January and was buried on the Mount of Olives. Seventy-five years after his death, Hershler was recognized by the Israel Defense Forces as the first "national martyr" in the Jewish-Arab conflict. He is one of approximately three dozen Jews killed during Ottoman-ruled Palestine, who are commemorated as part of Israeli's annual Yom Hazikaron memorial day.

The mill was not a success due to a lack of wind. Wind conditions in Jerusalem could not guarantee its continued operation. There were probably no more than 20 days a year with strong enough breezes. Another reason for the mill's failure was technological. The machinery was designed for soft European wheat, which required less wind power than the local wheat. Nevertheless, the mill operated for nearly two decades until the first steam-powered mill was completed in Jerusalem in 1878. In the late 19th century the mill became neglected and abandoned.

=== British Mandate ===
It was not until the 1930s that the mill was cosmetically restored by British Mandate authorities together with the Pro-Jerusalem Society. During this restoration decorative, non-functional fixed sails were placed at the top of the structure.

==== 1947–48 civil war ====
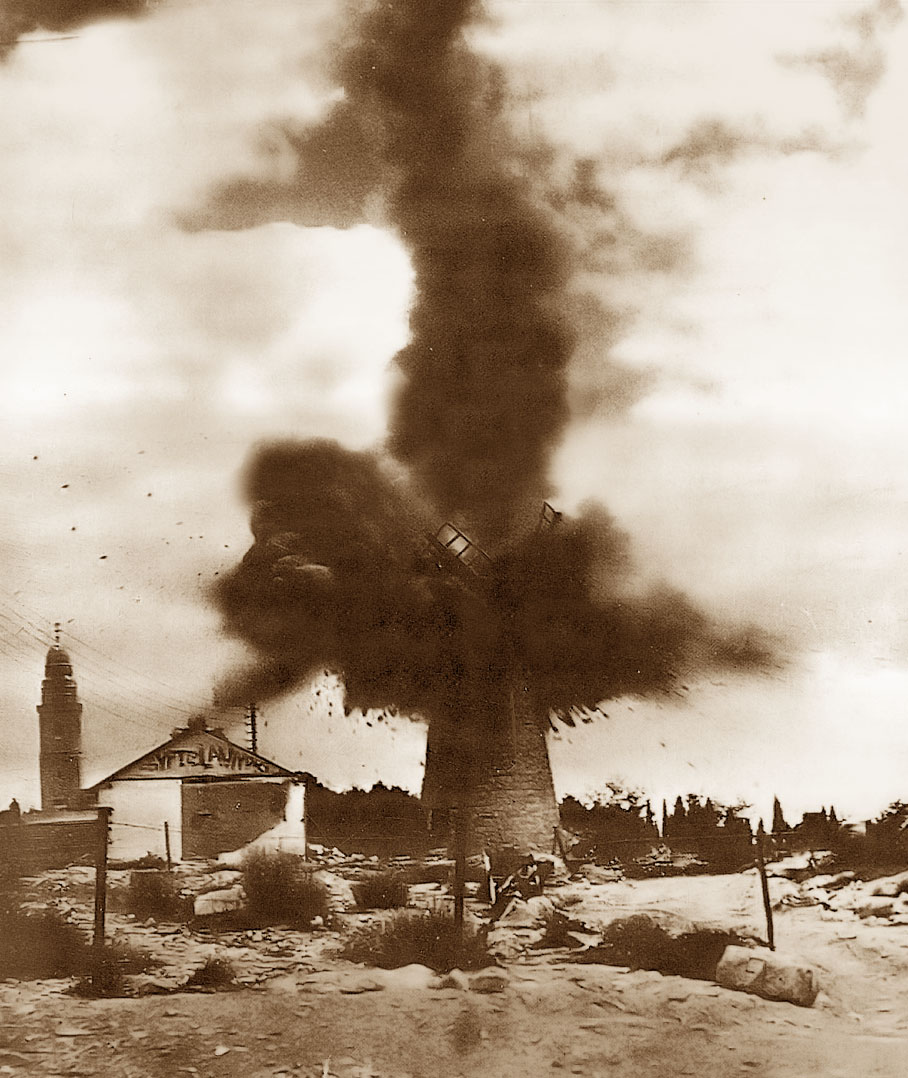
Blowing up of the windmill by the British in 1948

During the 1948 blockade of Jerusalem the Jewish Haganah fighters built an observation post at the top of the tower. In an attempt to impede their activities, the British authorities ordered the windmill be blown up in an operation mockingly dubbed by the population "Operation Don Quixote." By chance however, the unit tasked with destroying the windmill happened to be from Ramsgate, home to Montefiore's long-time residence. When the soldiers observed the name of their hometown next to Montefiore's on a plaque displayed on the building, they "re-interpreted" their orders and blew up only the observation post at the top of the tower, rather than the entire structure, there is also a story that one of the soldiers was of Romany Gypsy descent. His family had picked hops on one of Lord Montefiore's estates, and he remembered the kindness of the family and the Jewish people in England towards the Romany community. He reminded his fellow soldiers of the fact that Montefiore's alms-houses had housed and fed thousands of British men, women, and children. Hearing this, they decided to only blow up the outpost at the top and went to great lengths to keep the structure intact during the process.

=== State of Israel ===
Over the years the building's condition had deteriorated again and following the reunification of Jerusalem in the Six-Day War another cosmetic restoration was carried out, as part of which a decorative bronze cap was added to the structure.

==== Restoration ====
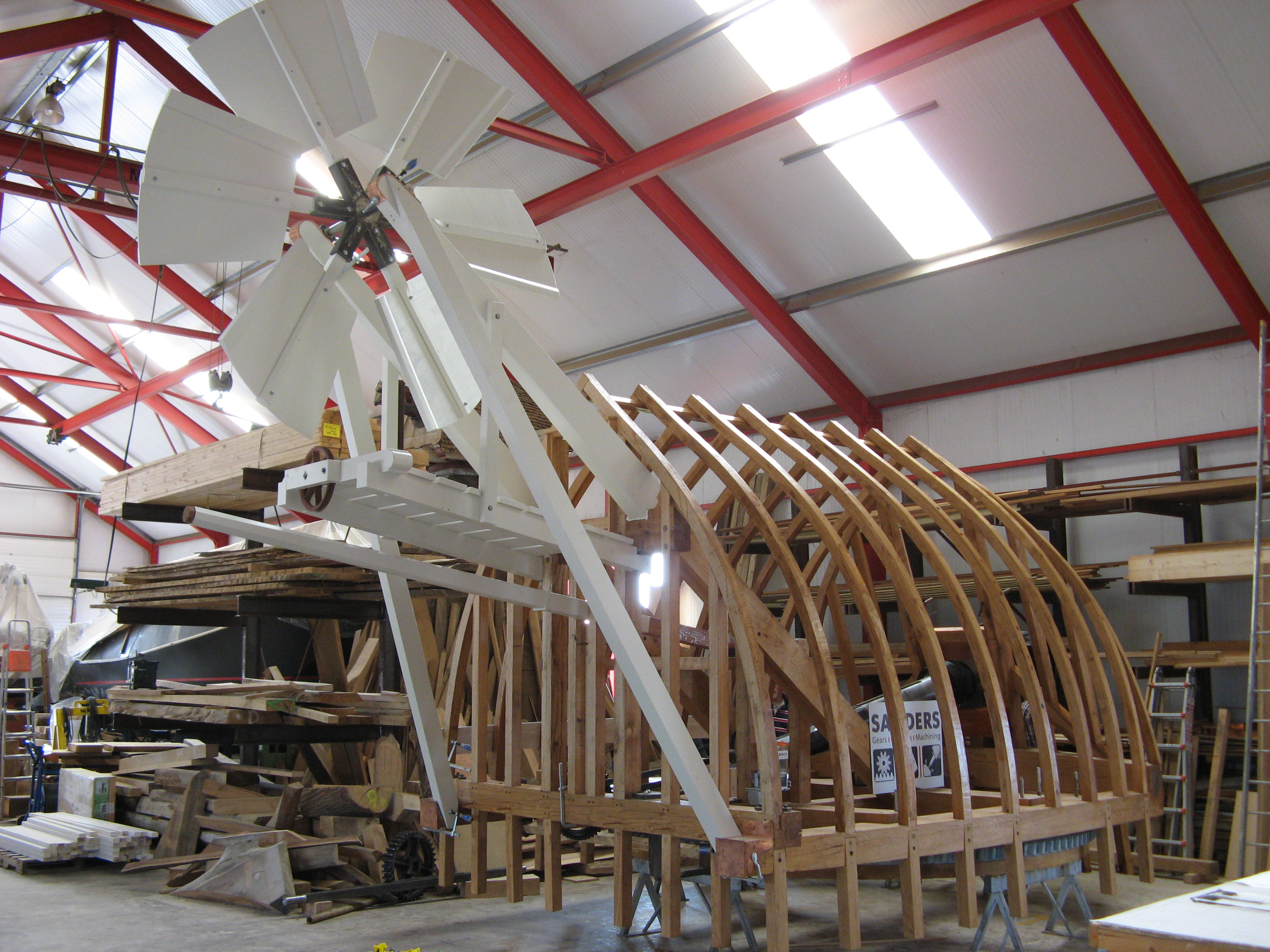
Cap under construction in Sloten

In 2012 the mill was completely restored to full working order using the original 1850s plans (which were located in the British Library) as a guide. The restoration was part of Israel's 60th anniversary celebrations.

A Dutch organisation, "Christians for Israel" (Dutch: Stichting Christenen voor Israël) promoted the scheme. A model of Stelling Minnis windmill, built by Tom Holman, was taken to the Netherlands to raise funds for the restoration. None of the original machinery survived. Millwright Willem Dijkstra rebuilt the floors, sails, cap and machinery in his workshop in Sloten in cooperation with Dutch construction company Lont and British millwright Vincent Pargeter. The windshaft was cast and machined at Sanders IJzergieterij en Machinefabriek B.V. (Sanders’ foundry and machines factory) in Goor. The parts were then shipped to Israel and reassembled on site. Dijkstra, his family and employee temporarily moved to Israel to help with the restoration. The cap and sails were lifted into place on July 25, 2012, and the mill was turning for the first time again on August 6. The first bag of flour was ground in May 2013.

A carriage was brought to Palestine in 1906 by Boris Schatz, the founder of the Bezalel Academy of Art, but was destroyed in a fire in 1986. The carriage was part of the collection of the Bezalel Museum which became the basis of the Israel Museum.

== See also ==
- Tourism in Israel
- Architecture of Israel
