= Mahane Yehuda =

Mahane Yehuda may refer to:

== Places ==
- Mahane Yehuda (neighborhood), a neighborhood in Jerusalem
- Mahane Yehuda Market, an open-air marketplace in Jerusalem
- Mahane Yehuda Police Station, a building in Jerusalem
- Mahane Yehuda, a neighborhood in south Petah Tikva, originally an independent settlement

== Other ==
- "Mahane Yehuda", mounted guards company founded by Michael Halperin in 1891 (see Ness Ziona)
- Hapoel Mahane Yehuda F.C., association football team from Petah Tikva
