= Mahane Yehuda Police Station =

- משטרה מחנה יהודה
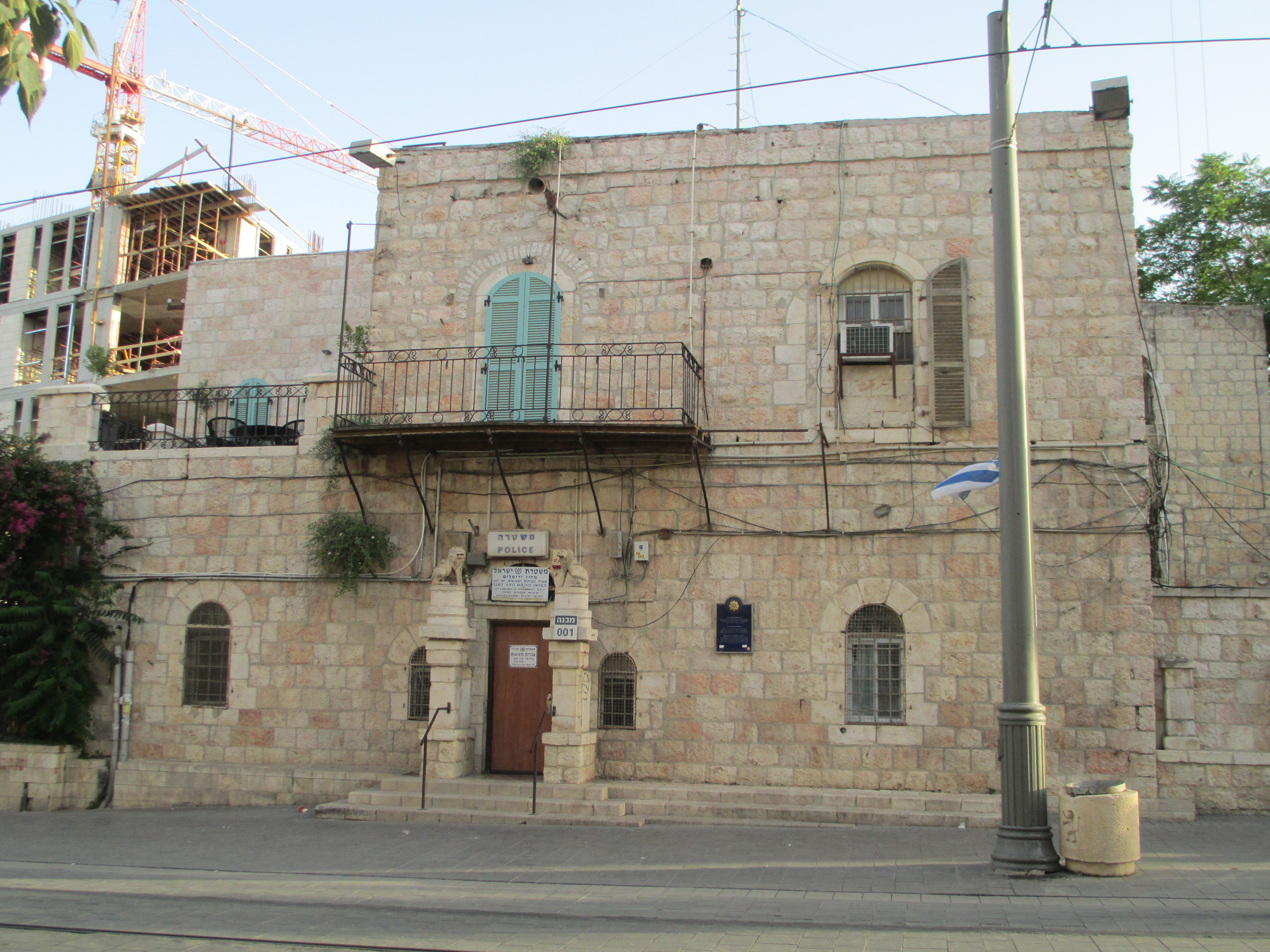
- View of the building in 2016
- Interactive map of the Mahane Yehuda Police Station area

General information
- Status: Completed
- Type: Police station
- Location: 107 Jaffa Road; Jerusalem
- Coordinates: 31.785295°N 35.21377°E

Technical details
- Floor count: 2

Other information
- Number of rooms: 12

Mahane Yehuda Police Station is a historic two-story building located at 107 Jaffa Road in Jerusalem. Constructed in stages during the nineteenth century, it was built to house the British Consul-General of Jerusalem, Noel Temple Moore, and his family, and was home to other British consuls until World War I. In 1920, when the British mandatory government went into effect, the house was converted into a police station. Following the establishment of the state of Israel in 1948, the Jerusalem District lost and found department was added to the police station.

The building is noted for the two stone lions mounted on pillars that originally flanked the entrance in the wall surrounding the property. During infrastructure work for the construction of the Jerusalem Light Rail, the wall and front garden were removed to accommodate the widening of the street and sidewalk. The lion pillars were moved next to the building's entrance, which is now accessed directly from the sidewalk.

== History ==
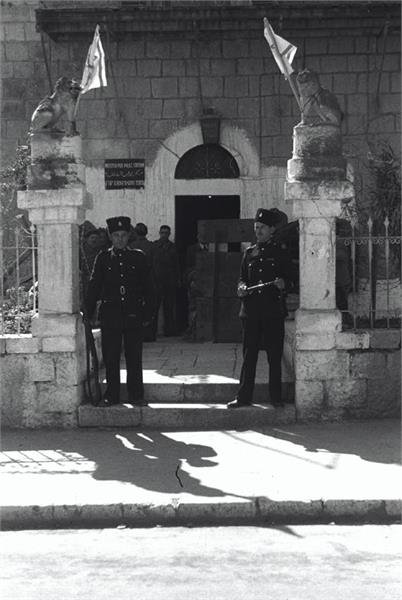
Lion statues and entrance to the building in 1948

The building was constructed in stages during the nineteenth century to be used as a residence for the British Consul-General of Jerusalem, Noel Temple Moore, and his family; Moore served in this official capacity from 1863 to 1890. At the time of its construction, it was the westernmost building on Jaffa Road from the direction of the Old City. The site, on the south side of the street, was chosen because it was adjacent to a Turkish guardtower which could offer protection to the solitary house. Later British consuls and their families also lived here until World War I.

The neighborhood of Mahane Yehuda was established nearby, on the north side of Jaffa Road, in 1887. In 1920, when the British mandatory government went into effect, the house was converted into the Mahane Yehuda Police Station. Following the establishment of the state of Israel, the lost and found department for the Jerusalem District was added to the station; this department functions to this day.

During the 1936–39 Arab revolt in Palestine, the police station served as a weapons depot for Haganah soldiers defending the city. Patai describes how in 1939, after joining the Haganah, he and his friend were assigned to guard duty in the Mamilla Cemetery:

Once a week in the evening we went to the Mahane Yehuda police station, where each of us was given a rifle, ammunition, and some sort of makeshift uniform, and then, thus equipped, marched to a house facing the Mamilla Cemetery, through which Arab attackers were known to have sneaked into the Jewish part of Jerusalem. We climbed up the stairs to the flat roof of the three-story building and stood, or rather sat, watch there until 2 o'clock in the morning, when we were replaced by another two men. We went back to the police station, returned our gear, and went home to sleep. Throughout the months we performed this duty we never saw a suspicious movement, and, of course, never fired a single round.

== Description ==
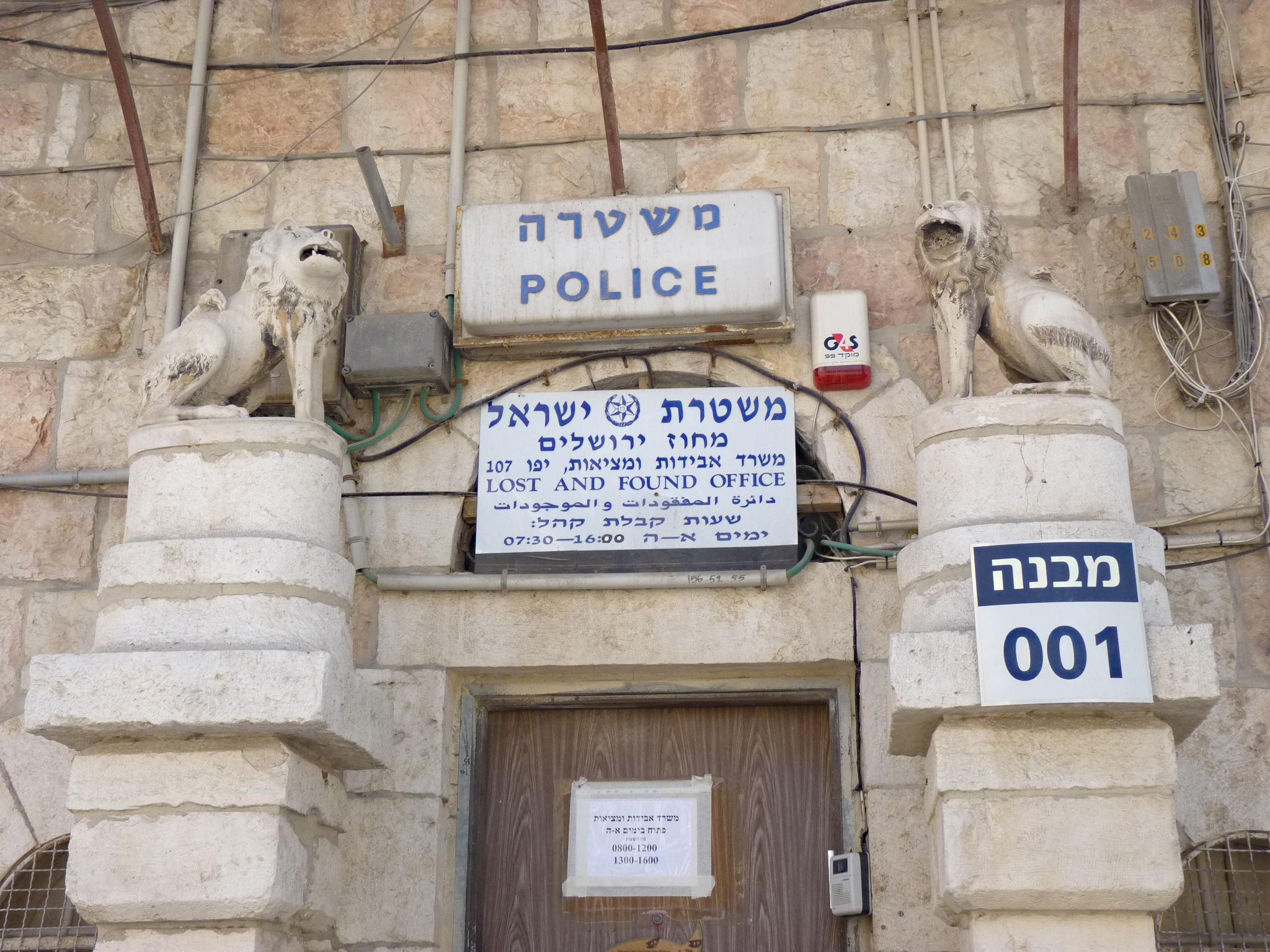
Lion statues flanking the entrance

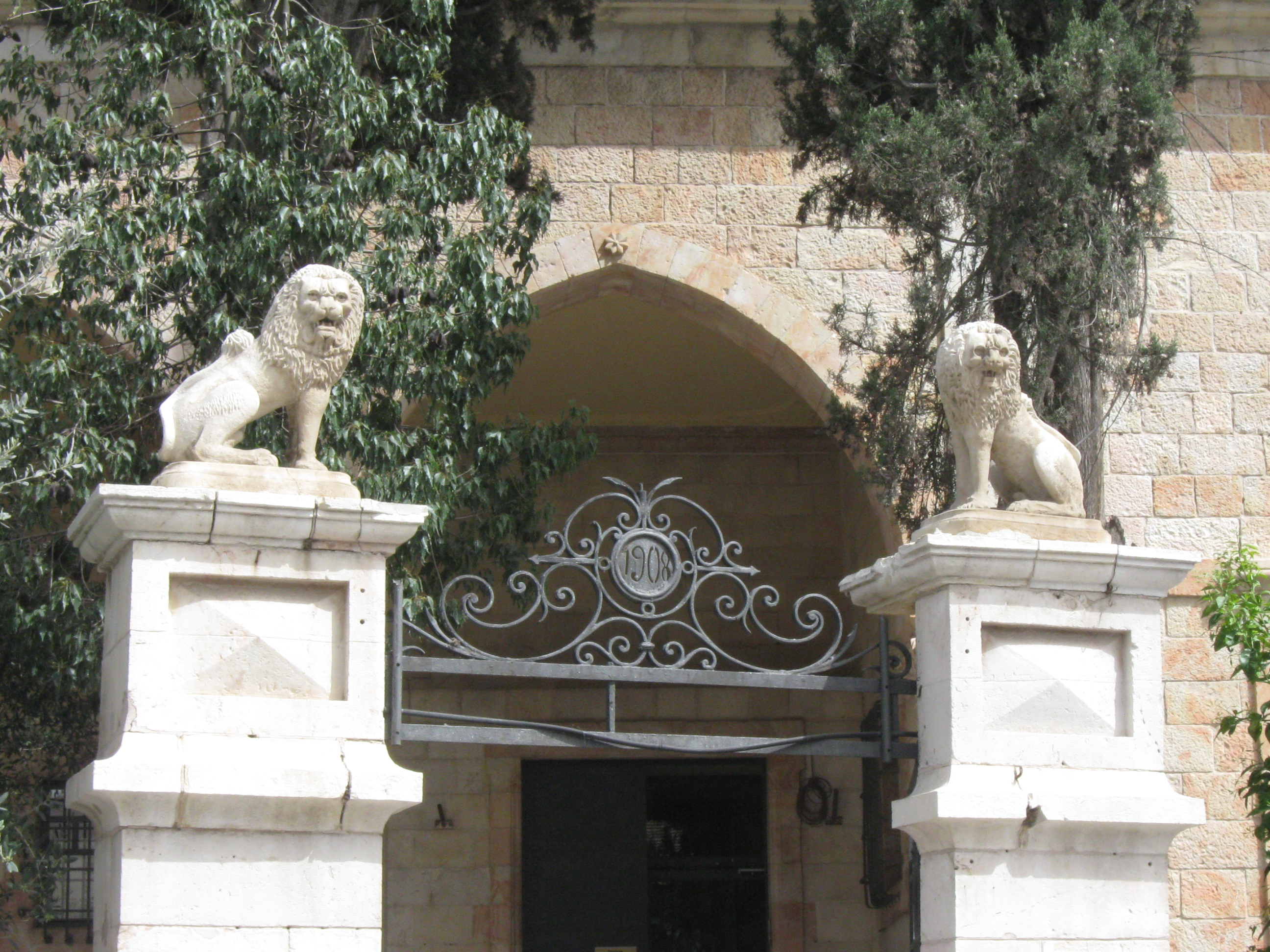
Lion statues in front of the Mashiach Borochoff House

The stone house has two stories. The interiors are spacious, with vaulted ceilings and six rooms on each floor. The second-floor balconies have decorative ironwork.

To the rear of the building was a large garden planted with fruit trees and ornamental plants. This area was used for entertaining friends and acquaintances of the house's occupants. A stable for horses and donkeys was located next to the garden. The garden in the front of the house was smaller and enclosed by a stone wall. A pillar was placed on either side of the entrance in the wall, and atop each pillar was a stone lion.

The sculptor of the lions is unknown. Some believe they were sculpted by Simcha Yanover, who produced the similar-looking lions mounted on pillars in front of the Mashiach Borochoff House further east on Jaffa Road. Others aver that the statues were imported by a Bulgarian Jewish family who rented this residence. As the family name was Aryeh (Hebrew for "lion"), they chose these statues to memorialize themselves. Alternately, the family could have been Marranos from Spain named Leone, or relatives of an Austrian royal family whose symbol was the lion.

During infrastructure work for the construction of the Jerusalem Light Rail, the building's integrity was preserved. However, in order to accommodate the widening of the street and sidewalk, the stone wall and front garden were removed. The lion pillars were moved next to the building's entrance, which is now accessed directly from the sidewalk.

== Sources ==
- Kroyanker, David; Wahrman, Dror (1983). Jerusalem Architecture, Periods and Styles: The Jewish quarters and public buildings outside the Old City walls, 1860–1914. Jerusalem Institute for Israel Studies. ISBN 9652610194.
- Patai, Raphael (2000). Journeyman in Jerusalem: Memories and Letters, 1933–1947. Lexington Books. ISBN 0739102095.
- Rosenthal, Gabriella (1982). In and Around Jerusalem with Gabriella Rosenthal. Tebo Press.
- Tagger, Mathilde A.; Kerem, Yitzchak (2006). Guidebook for Sephardic and Oriental Genealogical Sources in Israel. Avotaynu. ISBN 1886223289.
