= Batei Saidoff =

Neighborhood in western Jerusalem

Coordinates: 31.7863°N 35.2100°E

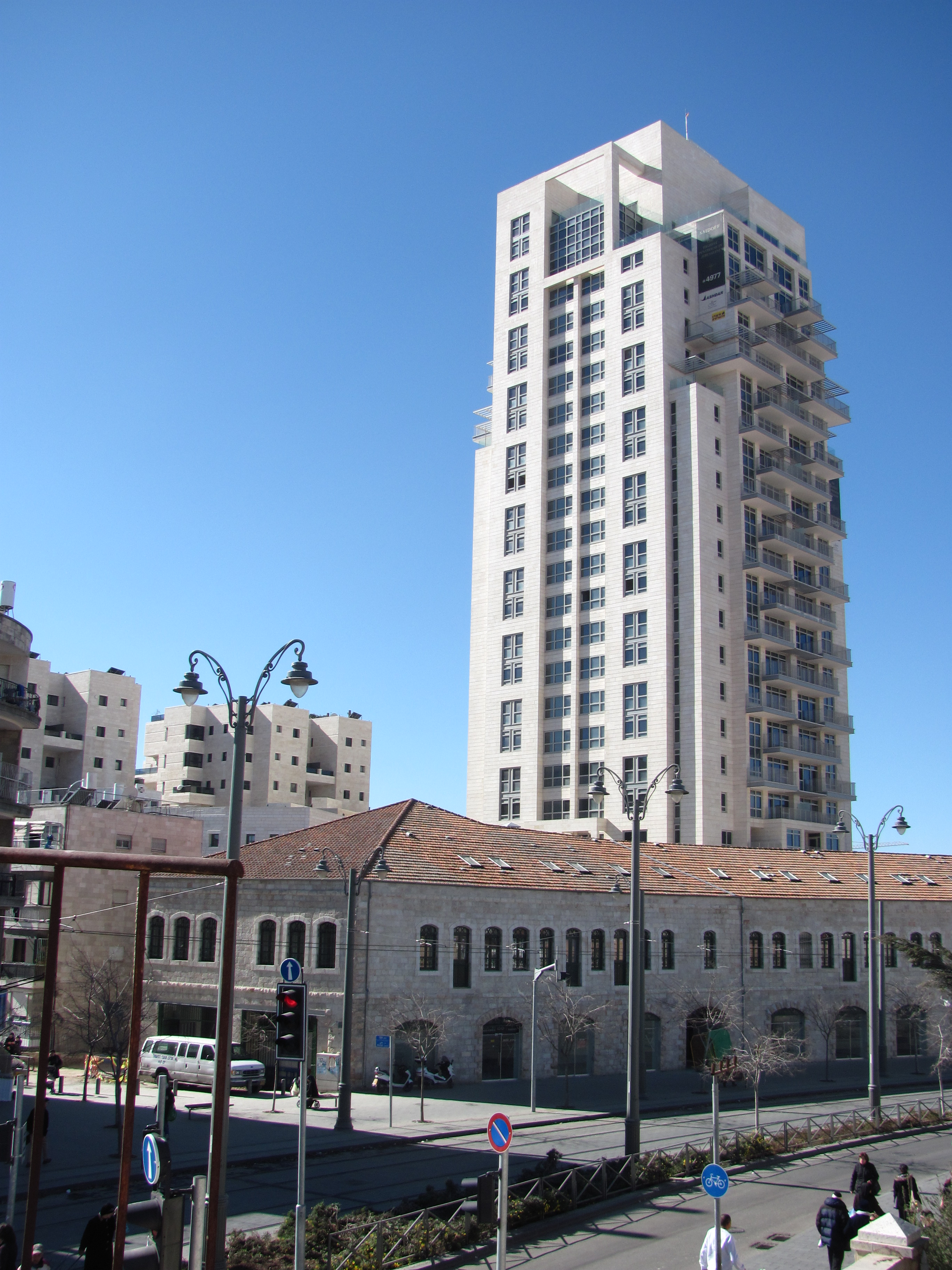
Saidoff Tower rising behind the original red-roofed buildings of Batei Saidoff.

Batei Saidoff (Hebrew: בתי סיידוף, "Saidoff Houses") is a former courtyard neighborhood in western Jerusalem. Erected by Yitzhak Saidoff, a wealthy Bukharan Jew, in 1911, it was one of a series of courtyard neighborhoods built along Jaffa Road in the late 19th and early 20th centuries, together with Sha'arei Yerushalayim and Ohel Shlomo. In the 2000s the two buildings facing Jaffa Road were evacuated of tenants and redeveloped as upscale shops, and a 23-story luxury residential tower was constructed south of the courtyard.

== Location ==
Batei Saidoff is located on the southern side of Jaffa Road, east of Sha'arei Zedek Street and west of Eliyahu Mani Street. It is east of the original Sha'arei Zedek Hospital (now the Israel Broadcasting Authority) and west of Mahane Yehuda Market. It was built opposite the Ohel Shlomo neighborhood and to the east of the Sha'arei Yerushalayim neighborhood, both located on the northern side of Jaffa Road.

== History ==
One group that made a mark on early Jerusalem home construction was Bukharan Jews, mostly affluent merchants who built upscale homes and public institutions. At the same time as the Bukharim quarter was under construction, Bukharan Jews erected several fine buildings along Jaffa Road. These include the Mashiach Borochoff House, the Kandinoff House, the Sephardic Orphanage, and Batei Saidoff. Batei Saidoff was built by Yitzhak Saidoff, a wealthy Bukharan Jew, in 1911.

Batei Saidoff was designed as an "open courtyard" with two long, two-story buildings attached at an angle on the southern side of Jaffa Road and two smaller, two-story buildings at the eastern and western sides of the courtyard. The homes opened onto the courtyard, with a balcony accessing the upper story. A small synagogue was on the upper story. Shops occupied the lower story of the buildings, with their entrances facing Jaffa Road. In the courtyard stood two cisterns and a shared bathroom tower. The development was considered luxurious for its era.

By the 1950s the residents of Batei Saidoff were primarily poor Sephardi and Mizrahi Jewish families. The buildings deteriorated as family dwellings were replaced by workshops and warehouses. The facade underwent a facelift by the Jerusalem municipality in 1983.

== Redevelopment ==
In 1999 a renewal plan promoted by a group of homeowners called for the construction of a seven-story residential tower on the site of Batei Saidoff. In following years, the plan changed to that of a 23-story luxury residential tower consisting of 90 penthouses and duplexes, ranging from three to six rooms each, to be erected south of the courtyard. The complex will include a swimming pool, indoor gym, spa, and synagogue; there will also be a concierge service and a 24-hour surveillance system.

The high-rise proposal aroused opposition from conservation groups, who contested it in the Israeli Supreme Court, but the project received building rights in 2008. The last tenants were evacuated and the original two-story buildings abutting Jaffa Road were restored and prepared for occupancy by upscale shops and art galleries, while the other buildings in the complex were razed. The Saidoff Tower joins four other luxury high-rises planned for Jaffa Road, with the goal of revitalizing the city center.

== Sources ==
- Ben-Arieh, Yehoshua (1979). עיר בראי תקופה: ירושלים החדשה בראשיתה [A City Reflected in its Times: New Jerusalem – The Beginnings] (in Hebrew). Jerusalem: Yad Izhak Ben-Zvi Publications.
- Kroyanker, David; Wahrman, Dror (1983). Jerusalem Architecture, Periods and Styles: The Jewish Quarters and Public Buildings Outside the Old City Walls, 1860-1914. Jerusalem Institute for Israel Studies. ISBN 9652610194.
- Wager, Eliyahu (1988). Illustrated Guide to Jerusalem. The Jerusalem Publishing House.
