= Mashiach Borochoff House =

- בית משיח בורוכוף
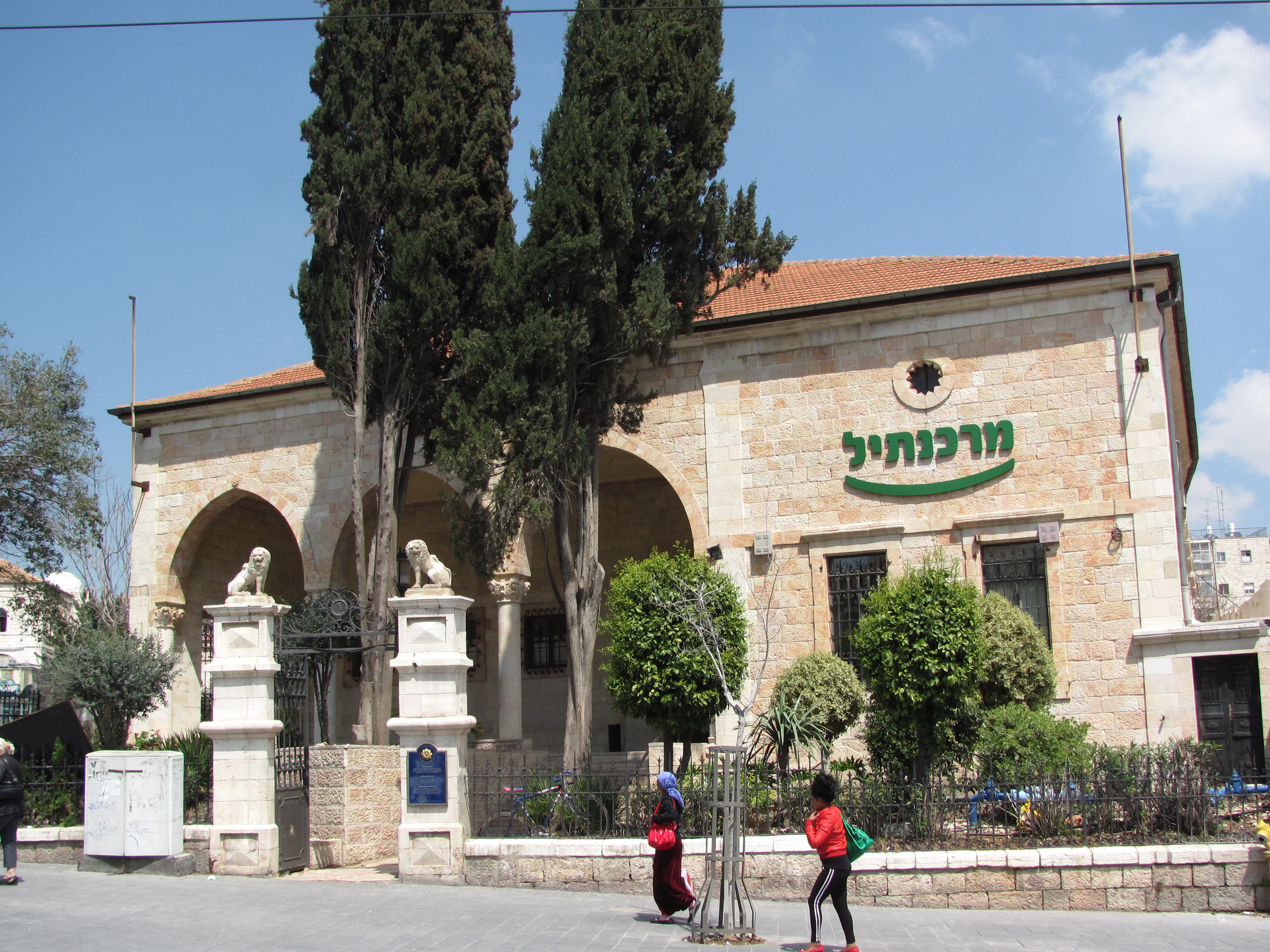
- Interactive map of the Mashiach Borochoff House area

General information
- Status: Used as a bank
- Architectural style: Eclectic
- Location: 64 Jaffa Road, Jerusalem
- Coordinates: 31°47′01.5″N 35°13′01″E
- Current tenants: Mercantile Discount Bank
- Completed: 1908

Technical details
- Floor count: 2

Mashiach Borochoff House (Hebrew: בית משיח בורוכוף) is a historical building located at 64 Jaffa Road in Jerusalem. Built in 1908 in eclectic style, its entrance is covered by an arcade with pointed arches supported by pseudo-Corinthian columns. The gate, in the style of 17th-century Georgian architecture, consists of two pillars connected by ironwork. A lion statue is placed atop each pillar. The house was built by Mashiach Borochoff, a wealthy Bukharan Jewish merchant, as a family residence. In 1947, a year after Borochoff's death, the property was sold to Barclays bank. It has functioned as a bank branch since that time.

== History ==
Mashiach Borochoff was a wealthy Bukharan Jewish textile merchant who resided in Moscow. The youngest son of Baruch Borochoff, he accompanied his father to Palestine in 1882 when his father made aliyah and settled in the Nahalat Shiv'a neighborhood. Mashiach returned to Russia to run the family's business operations in Moscow and Tashkent. In 1919 he moved the family's assets to Palestine and settled in Jerusalem, where he worked as an activist on behalf of the Sephardic Jewish community. From 1925 to 1946 he served as governor of the Sephardi Orphanage.

Borochoff built the mansion at 64 Jaffa Road to accommodate his large family. He acquired the land from Wilhelm Duisberg, a German Christian. The house was erected on the southern part of Duisberg's land, facing Jaffa Road, while the German Consulate was built on the northern part of the property, facing Street of the Prophets. The house faced the neighborhood of Even Yisrael across Jaffa Road. It was surrounded by other prestigious buildings, including the home of Joseph Navon to the north and the Kaminetz Hotel to the west. The house was one of several "impressive buildings" on Jaffa Road constructed by wealthy Bukharan Jews; others include Batei Saidoff and the Kandinoff House.

== Architecture ==
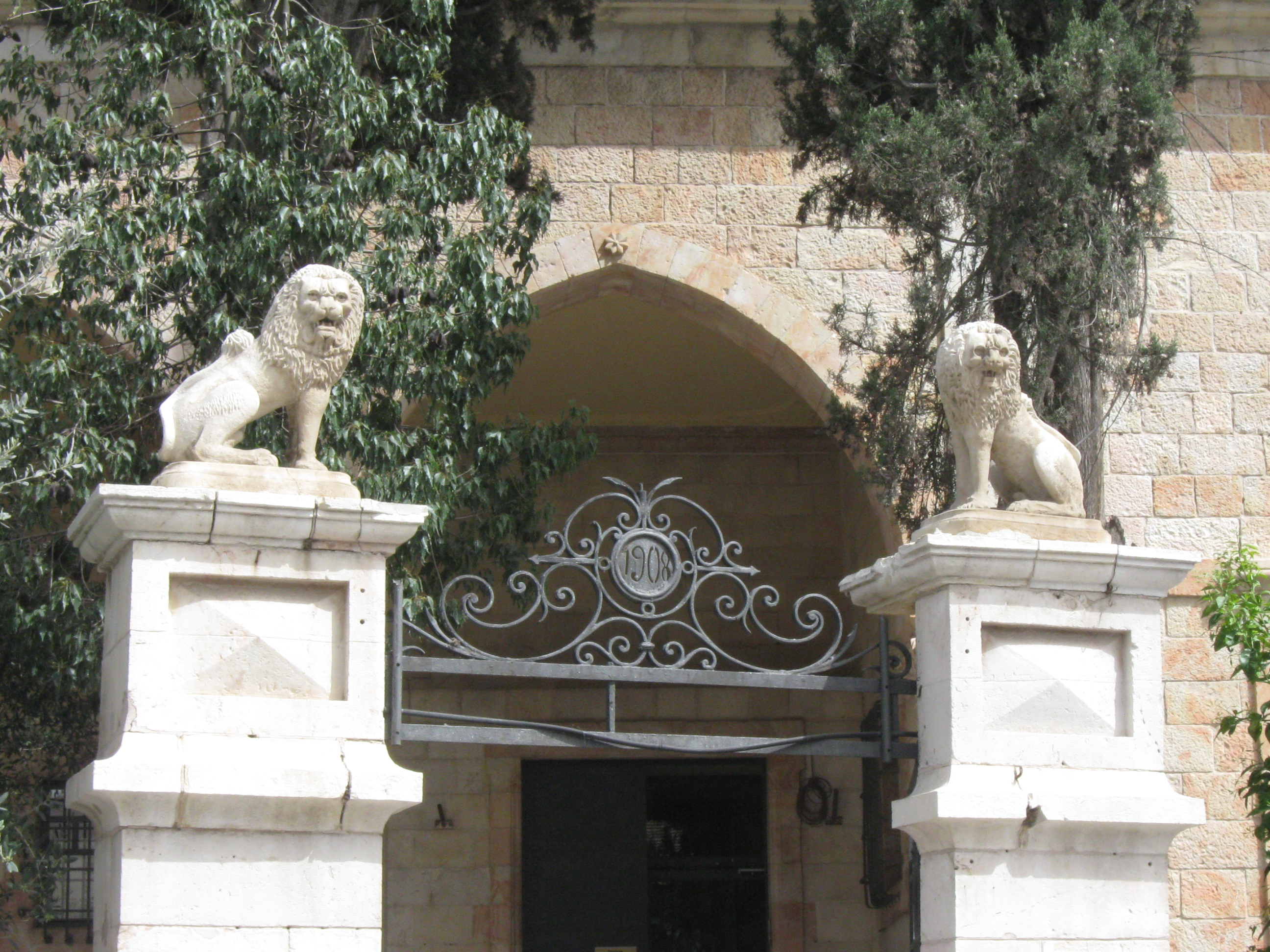
Lion statues in front of the Mashiach Borochoff House, 2010

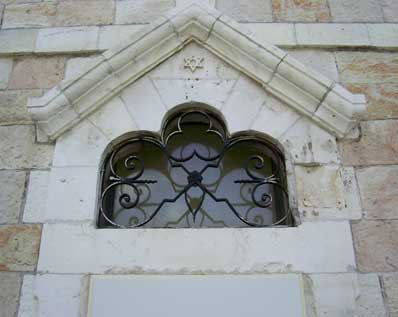
Star of David decoration on a side window.

The mansion was designed in an eclectic architectural style. The entrance is covered with an arcade with three pointed arches supported by pseudo-Corinthian columns. The ceiling of the arcade is decorated with rosettes. The overall effect was meant to impress and attract the attention of passersby on Jaffa Road, the main Jerusalem thoroughfare.

The ironwork front gate hangs between two pillar piers with a scrollwork overthrow bearing the date of construction, 1908. According to Kroyanker, the gate is in the style of 17th-century Georgian architecture.

Atop each pillar is a lion statue. These statues were sculpted by Simcha Yanover. The lion statues are noted for their resemblance to the lion statues posted on pillars in front of the Mahane Yehuda Police Station, further to the west, although it is not known who sculpted the latter. One of the lions was rendered in micrography in The Jerusalem Haggadah (1996). In 2016 the lion statue atop the right pillar went missing; it is assumed to have been stolen. The other lion statue sustained damage to its base, but is still affixed to the pillar.

== Bank branch ==
Borochoff died in 1946. In 1947 the property was sold to Barclays Bank, which turned the house into a bank branch. The branch underwent a name change in 1971 when Barclays established a subsidiary, Barclays Discount Bank. In 1993 the subsidiary was purchased by Israel Discount Bank and renamed Mercantile Discount Bank. A Mercantile Discount Bank branch operates in the house to this day.

== Sources ==
- Ben-Arieh, Yehoshua (1979). עיר בראי תקופה: ירושלים החדשה בראשיתה [A City Reflected in its Times: New Jerusalem – The Beginnings] (in Hebrew). Jerusalem: Yad Izhak Ben-Zvi Publications.
- Even-Or, Shmuel (1984). ירושלים: בניינים בעיר החדשה [Jerusalem: Buildings in the New City] (in Hebrew). Ariel Publishers.
- Gilbert, Martin (1996). Jerusalem in the twentieth century. Chatto & Windus. ISBN 9780701130701.
- Jacobs, Daniel (2009). The Rough Guide to Jerusalem (2nd ed.). Rough Guides UK. ISBN 978-1405380089.
- Kroyanker, David; Wahrman, Dror (1983). Jerusalem Architecture, Periods and Styles: The Jewish quarters and public buildings outside the Old City walls, 1860–1914. Jerusalem Institute for Israel Studies. ISBN 9652610194.
