= Ohel Shlomo =

Courtyard neighborhood in Jerusalem

Coordinates: 31.79°N 35.21°E

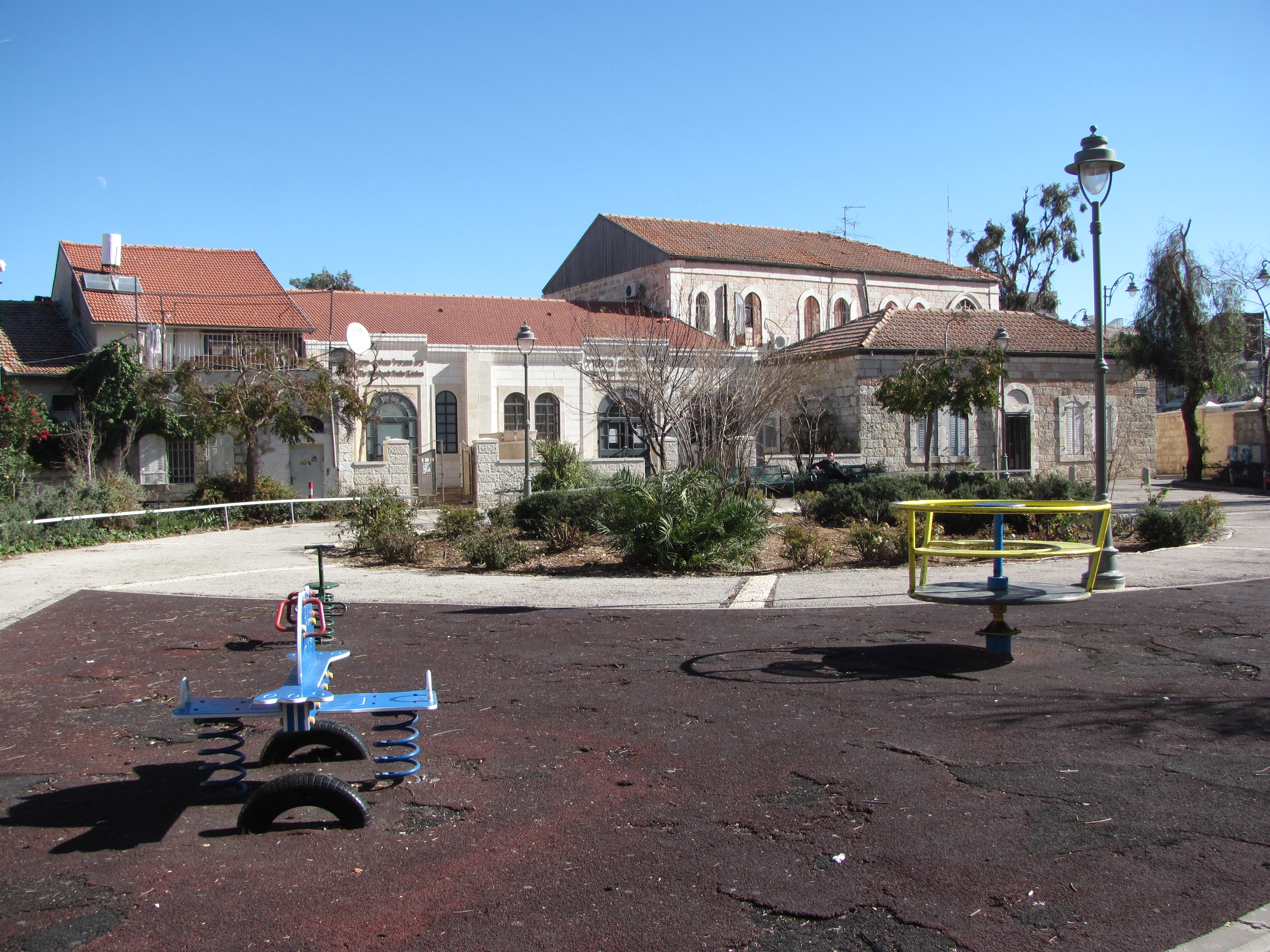
Partial view of Ohel Shlomo, with former courtyard in foreground.

Ohel Shlomo (Hebrew: אהל שלמה, lit. "Tent of Solomon") is a historical courtyard neighborhood in western Jerusalem. It is one of a series of courtyard neighborhoods built along Jaffa Road in the late 19th and early 20th centuries, together with Sha'arei Yerushalayim and Batei Saidoff. Today it is considered part of the Mekor Baruch neighborhood.

== Location ==
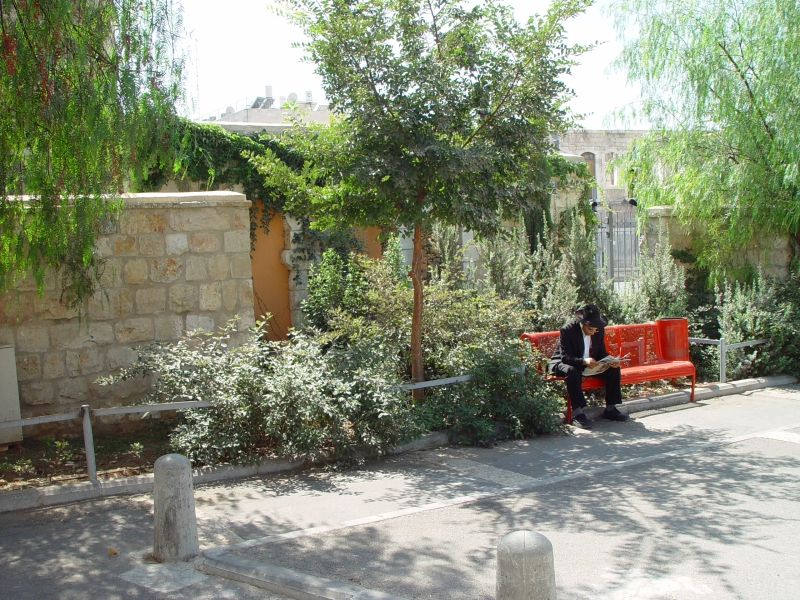
A reconstructed view of what the neighbourhood looked like.

The neighborhood is bordered by Jaffa Road to the south, HaTurim Street to the west, Alfandari Street to the north, and Navon Street to the east.

== Name ==
Ohel Shlomo was named for Shlomo Mizrahi, a Kurdish Jewish merchant who was the business partner of neighborhood founder Yitzchak Lipkin and who purchased the land for the development. Mizrahi’s son, Rahamim, was Lipkin's contractor.

== History ==
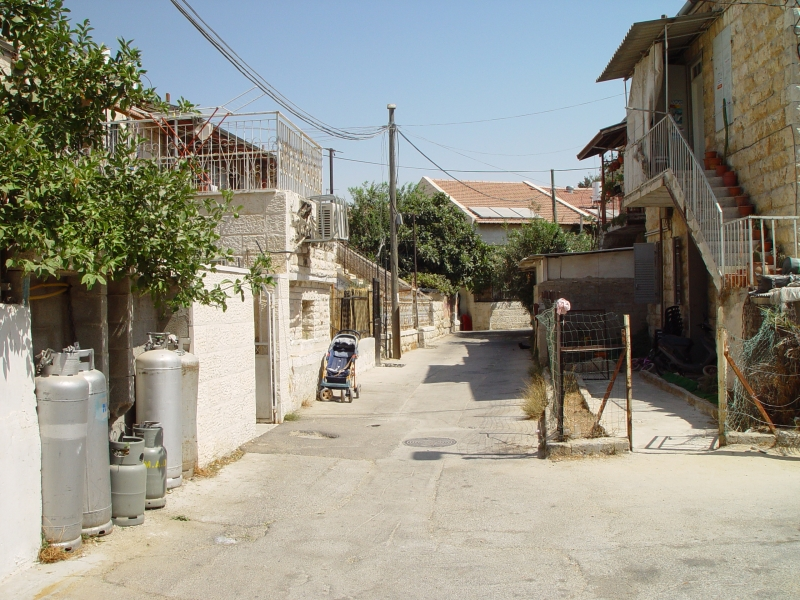
An alleyway in the neighbourhood.

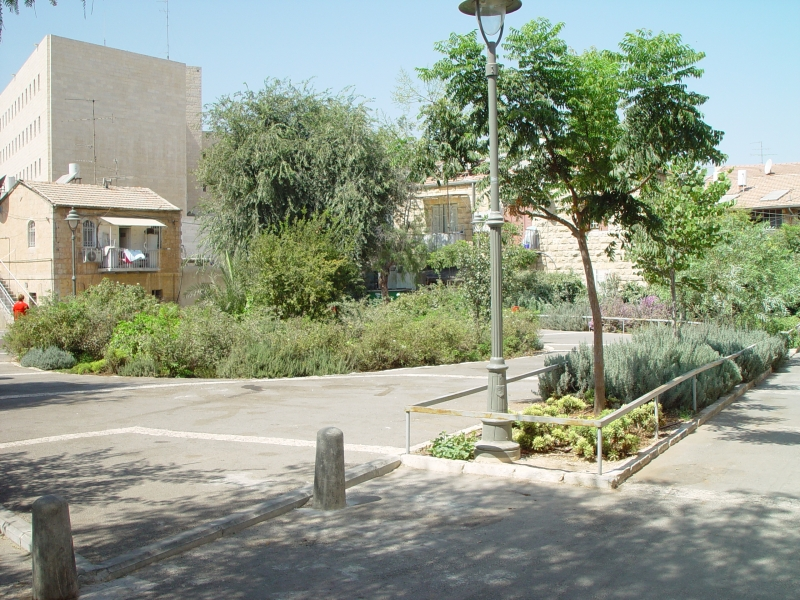
The park in the neighbourhood.

Ohel Shlomo was established by Yitzchak Lipkin (1834-1927), a Jewish immigrant from Russian Empire to Ottoman Jerusalem and businessman. Lipkin opposed the halukka system of welfare handouts, encouraging Jerusalem residents to support themselves by their own labor. To that end, he provided the financing for two neighborhoods in close proximity to each other along the northern side of Jaffa Road – Ohel Shlomo and Sha'arei Yerushalayim – and sold houses to individuals with easy payment terms.

Ohel Shlomo was established in the spring of 1891 with a plan calling for the construction of 50 homes within two years – 20 homes fronting Jaffa Road and 30 homes on the adjacent field to the north. The project was designed as an "open courtyard", with buildings on three sides and a water reservoir in the middle. By 1892, 35 homes had been constructed, and by 1897, 45. In a 1916 census conducted by the office of the Histadrut, the number of homes in Ohel Shlomo had reached 56, with a total of 215 occupants. According to Kroyanker, 145 homes were eventually built in the courtyard. Among the residents of the neighborhood between 1920 and 1940 were three of Lipkin's sons and their families.

=== School for the Blind ===
In 1902 the city's first school for the blind was established in Ohel Shlomo, for Jewish children ages 6 and up. In that era, infectious eye diseases were plaguing Jerusalem, and the school included in its curriculum the study of Torah and other subjects to ensure that the students, who had previously attended regular schools, would not fall behind in their classes. The language of instruction was Hebrew, and students also learned German. The school placed an emphasis on music and handicrafts, and students' work was sold throughout the city.

The school for the blind operated in Ohel Shlomo for eight years, educating 42 students. Afterward it moved to the Street of the Prophets, next to the Rothschild Hospital.

=== Jerusalem Light Rail construction ===
In planning the route of the Jerusalem Light Rail, which began construction in 2002, the city planning authority debated how to preserve the historic buildings that line Jaffa Road while at the same time accommodate passengers and train operations. While buildings such as Batei Saidoff, located across the street from Ohel Shlomo, were able to be preserved, the buildings of Ohel Shlomo that fronted Jaffa Road were determined to be beyond rehabilitation or preservation and were razed. Architects created a physical reminder of the historic homes by erecting in their place a concrete memorial inlaid with the original door and window frames of the destroyed buildings. To emphasize the shape of the frames, the surrounding wall was plastered in shades of turquoise, terracotta, and ochre.

== Present-day landmarks ==
=== Synagogues and yeshivas ===
- Amiel Synagogue, founded 1948
- Yeshivat Ben Ish Chai for kabbalists, founded 1958

=== Soup kitchen ===
The neighborhood hosts the downtown Jerusalem branch of Colel Chabad’s United Soup Kitchens.

== Sources ==
- Ben-Arieh, Yehoshua (1979). עיר בראי תקופה: ירושלים החדשה בראשיתה [A City Reflected in its Times: New Jerusalem – The Beginnings] (in Hebrew). Jerusalem: Yad Izhak Ben-Zvi Publications.
- Kroyanker, David; Wahrman, Dror (1983). Jerusalem Architecture, Periods and Styles: The Jewish Quarters and Public Buildings Outside the Old City Walls, 1860-1914. Jerusalem Institute for Israel Studies. ISBN 9652610194.
- Wager, Eliyahu (1988). Illustrated Guide to Jerusalem. The Jerusalem Publishing House.
