= Mahane Yehuda (neighborhood) =

Neighborhood of Jerusalem, Israel

Coordinates: 31.7847°N 35.2108°E

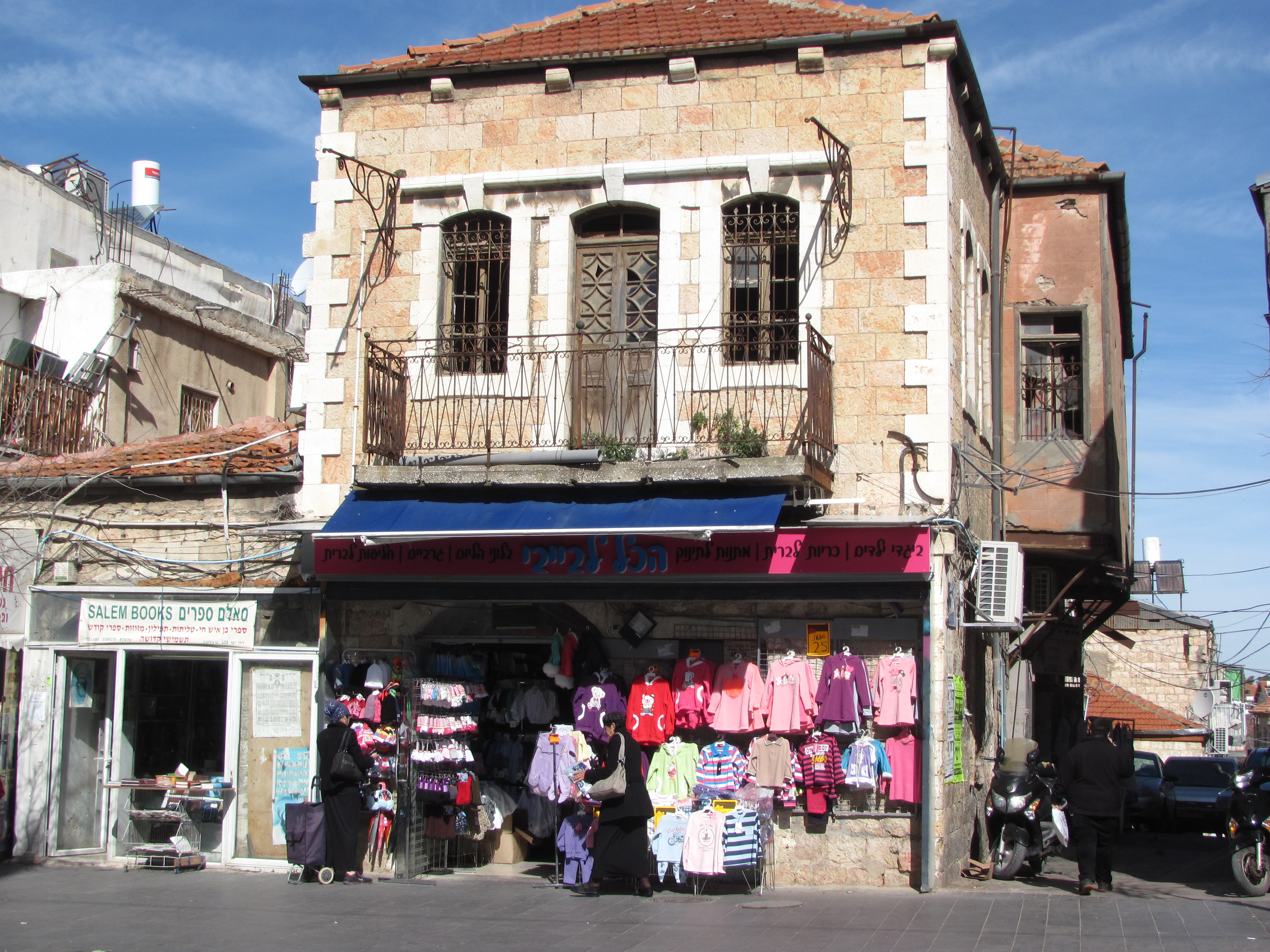
Buildings of the historic Mahane Yehuda neighborhood facing Jaffa Road

Mahane Yehuda (Hebrew: מחנה יהודה, "Camp of Judah") is an historic neighborhood in Jerusalem. Established on the north side of Jaffa Road in 1887, it was planned and managed by the consortium of Swiss-Christian banker Johannes Frutiger and his Jewish partners, Joseph Navon and Shalom Konstrum. By the end of the 19th century, it encompassed 162 homes. Originally occupied by upper middle-class residents, it became a working-class neighborhood beginning in the late 1920s. Today the neighborhood is part of Nachlaot. The Mahane Yehuda Market ("the shuk") located across the street was named after the neighborhood.

== Name ==
Mahane Yehuda was named after Joseph Navon's brother, Yehuda, who died at a young age.

== Location ==
The Mahane Yehuda neighborhood is bordered by David Yellin Street to the north, Yosef ben Matityahu Street to the east, Jaffa Road to the south, and Navon Street to the west.

== History ==
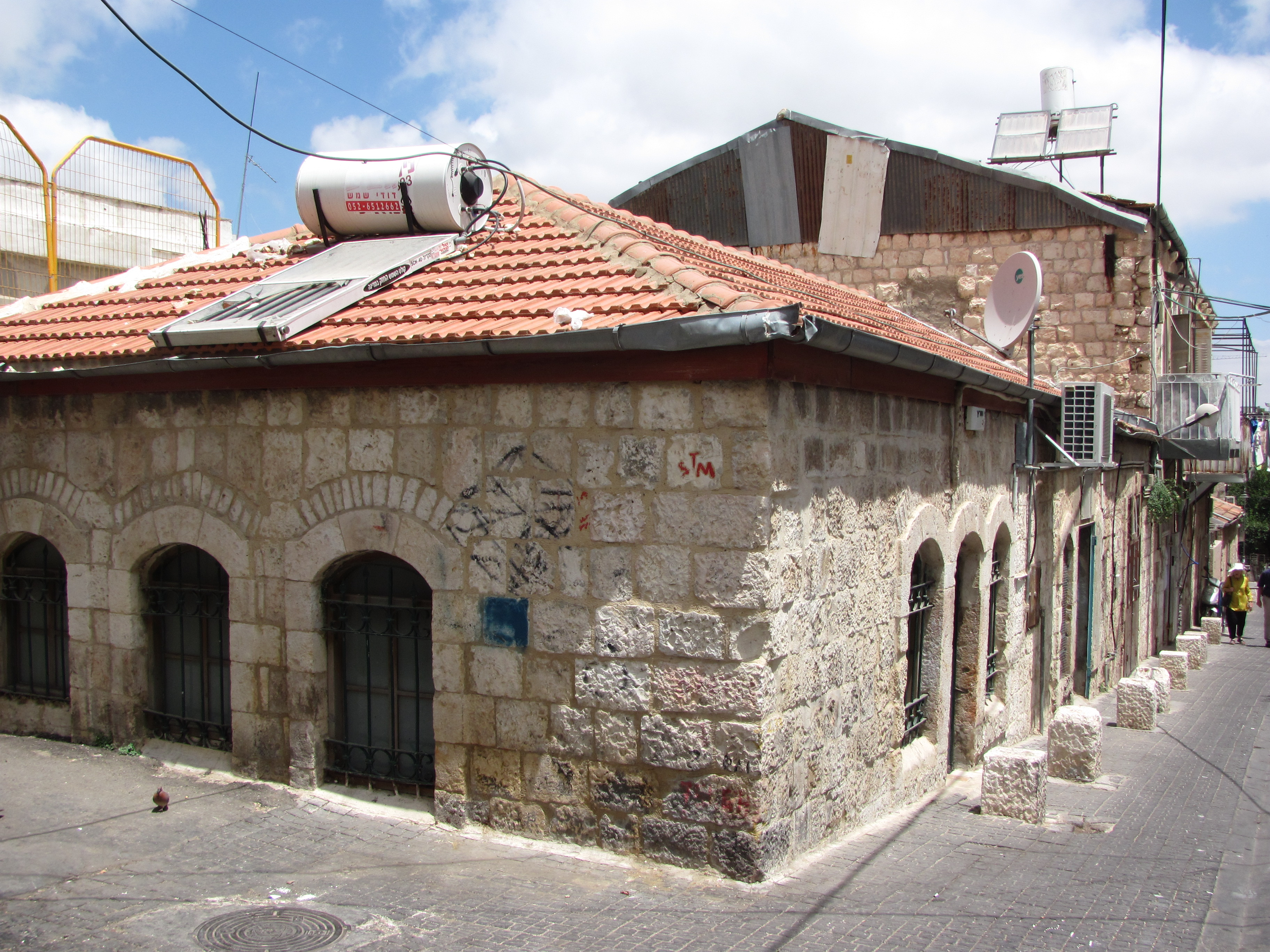
Original one-story building in Mahane Yehuda

Mahane Yehuda lay on land owned by Bank Frutiger, which owned other tracts around the city. The housing project was initially advertised in the Havatzelet newspaper in 1882 (issue 26). The advertisement, placed by Joseph Navon, promised the first fifty families a free plot on the condition that they would build their homes within six months. If this condition was not met, they would be required to pay Navon 300 groschen for the land. No one answered the advertisement.

Five years later, the consortium of Swiss-Christian banker Johannes Frutiger and his Jewish partners Navon and Shalom Konstrum came up with another plan to sell the neighborhood. This plan called for each home buyer to pay 25 napoléons up front for the land, and the remaining 150 napoléons of the costs – including land, construction, and joint upkeep of the water cistern and roadways – over a 15-year period at a rate of 10 napoléons per year. This arrangement proved far more attractive to buyers, who snapped up the initial offering. In the month of September 1887 alone, 39 buyers signed up to purchase homes.

At the time of its construction, the only other buildings in the vicinity lay on the south side of Jaffa Road: a two-story home occupied by the British Consul-General of Jerusalem (today the Mahane Yehuda Police Station) to the east, and the neighborhood of Beit Yaakov, established in 1885, to the west. By the end of 1888, 50 homes had been built in Mahane Yehuda and some buyers had begun re-selling their homes. A decade later, 162 homes had been constructed. The homes were constructed in typical fashion for the day, with an inner room accessed from an outer room.

== Residents ==
The first homeowners were upper middle class. They included the Sephardi Rishon LeZion of Jerusalem, Hakham Raphael Meir Panigel, Rabbi Eliyahu Navon and his son Joseph Navon, Shalom Konstrum, Israel Dov Frumkin, and Ephraim Cohen (principal of the Lämel School, often misspelled 'Lemel School').

Beginning in the late 1920s the neighborhood began attracting working-class Jewish immigrants from Kurdistan, Baghdad, and Aleppo. The lower-middle-class and poor Baghdadi immigrants continued there to speak the Judeo-Arabic vernacular, eat traditional cuisine, and retain the traditional ways of arranging marriages.

A census conducted in 1916 by the office of the Histadrut recorded 152 families comprising 512 individuals in Mahane Yehuda. A 1938 Jerusalem census noted 600 persons living in Mahane Yehuda, including both Ashkenazi and Sephardi Jews.

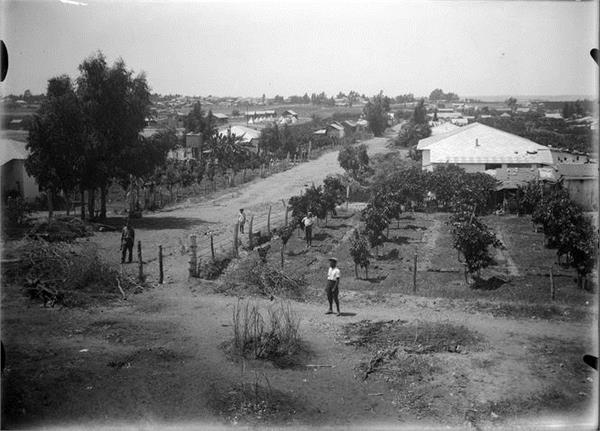
Mahane Yehuda 1934

== Religious institutions ==
=== Synagogues ===
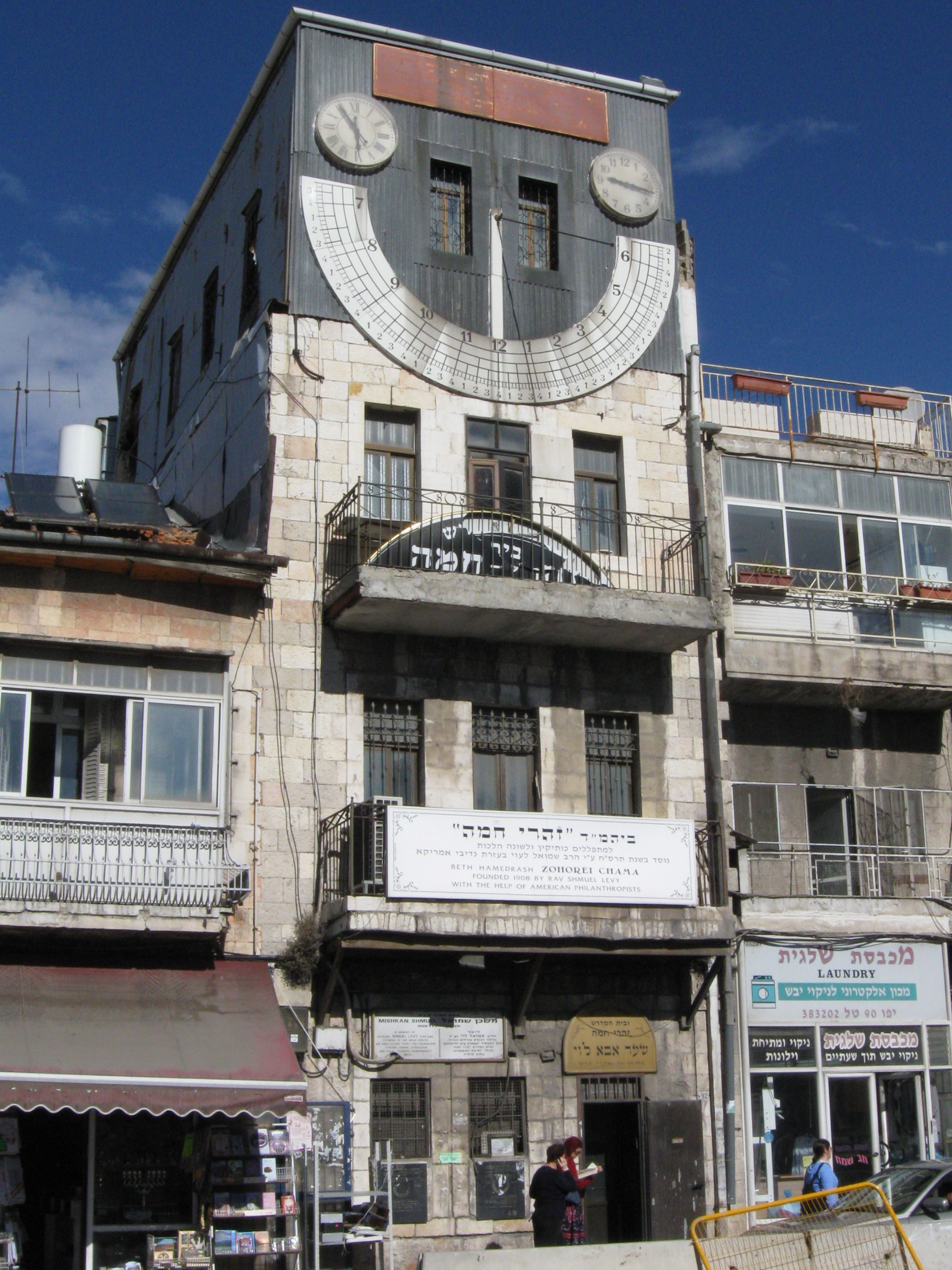
Zoharei Chama Synagogue ("Sundial Building")

Mahane Yehuda is home to eight synagogues. These include the landmark Zoharei Chama Synagogue ("Sundial Building"), which is open for prayer services throughout the day. The three-story stone building with a wooden attic (originally there was also a fifth-floor gallery) was constructed atop a Mahane Yehuda apartment purchased by Shmuel Levy in the early 1900s; the building was originally designed as a hostel for 50 guests with the synagogue on the third floor.

The Silvera synagogue and beth midrash, posthumously named Zechut Aharon, was established by Señor Aharon Silvera (d. 1925) of Aleppo on the upper floor of his two-story apartment in Mahane Yehuda. The Degel Reuven Synagogue, also on a second floor, was founded in 1893 for Mizrahi Jews.

=== Sfas Emes Yeshiva ===
In 1925 the Hasidim of the fourth Gerer Rebbe, Grand Rabbi Avraham Mordechai Alter (the Imrei Emes), founded the Sfas Emes Yeshiva in Mahane Yehuda. The Rebbe came to live in the yeshiva from 1940 until his death in 1948, and was buried in the yeshiva courtyard. His son, Rabbi Pinchas Menachem Alter, the seventh Gerrer Rebbe, also resided in the yeshiva and was buried beside his father in 1996. A red-brick ohel was placed over both graves.

== Modern-day ==
Unlike buildings fronting Jaffa Road in the historic neighborhoods of Ohel Shlomo and Sha'arei Yerushalayim to the west, the buildings of Mahane Yehuda facing Jaffa Road were preserved during construction of the Jerusalem Light Rail.

In 2011 the former bus parking lot between Mehuyas and Valero Streets, astride Jaffa Road, was re-landscaped into an urban square. This 5-million-shekel project, renamed Valero Square after Jerusalem banker Jacob Valero, was faced with granite and limestone and new lighting was installed. Valero Square hosts the annual municipal arba'at haminim market preceding the holiday of Sukkot. In December 2014 a 2-million-shekel urban art installation was unveiled in Valero Square. Titled "Vorayda" (Kurdish for "flower"), the installation includes four huge red nylon flowers resembling poppies posted atop metal trunks, which "open and shut pneumatically under the influence of movement and sound under and around them". Within two months, however, the nylon petals had been "seriously damaged by rain, wind, snow and pollution".

== Landmarks ==
=== Synagogues ===
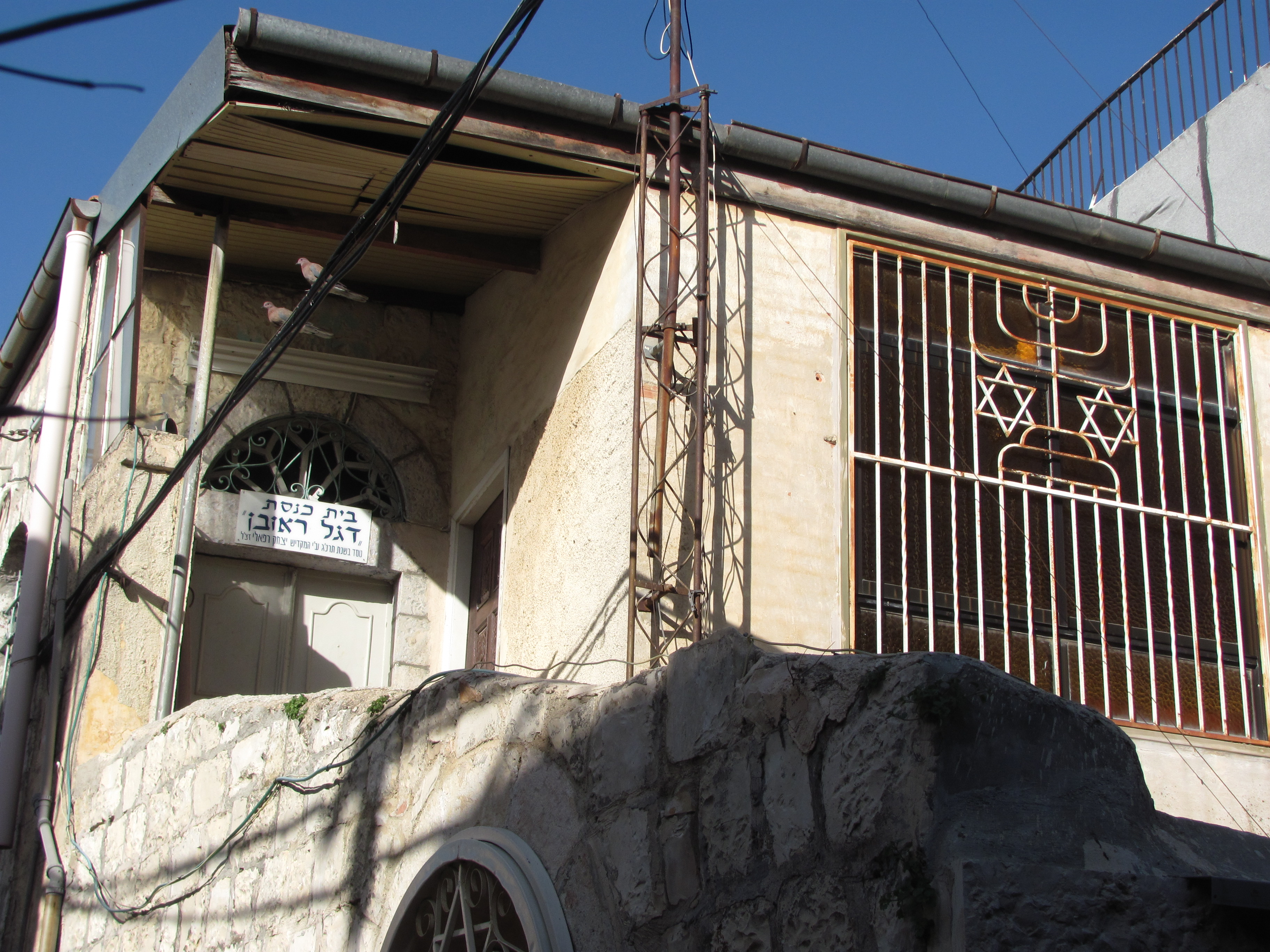
Degel Reuven Synagogue

- Degel Reuven Synagogue
- Sathon Synagogue
- Silvera Synagogue and Beth Midrash
- Yad Mordechai Synagogue
- Zoharei Chama Synagogue ("Sundial Building")

=== Yeshivas ===
- Sfas Emes Yeshiva

=== Other ===
- Ohel of the Gerrer Rebbes in the Sfas Emes Yeshiva courtyard
- Mani's Pharmacy (102 Jaffa Road), founded in 1927
- Oplatka Pharmacy (110 Jaffa Road), founded in 1917

== In literature ==
Mahane Yehuda is one of the settings for Haim Sabato's 2004 novel Ke'afafei Shachar (Like the Eyelids of Morning), translated into English as The Dawning of the Day: A Jerusalem Tale (Toby Press, 2006).
