= Sha'arei Yerushalayim =

Coordinates: 31.7874°N 35.2097°E

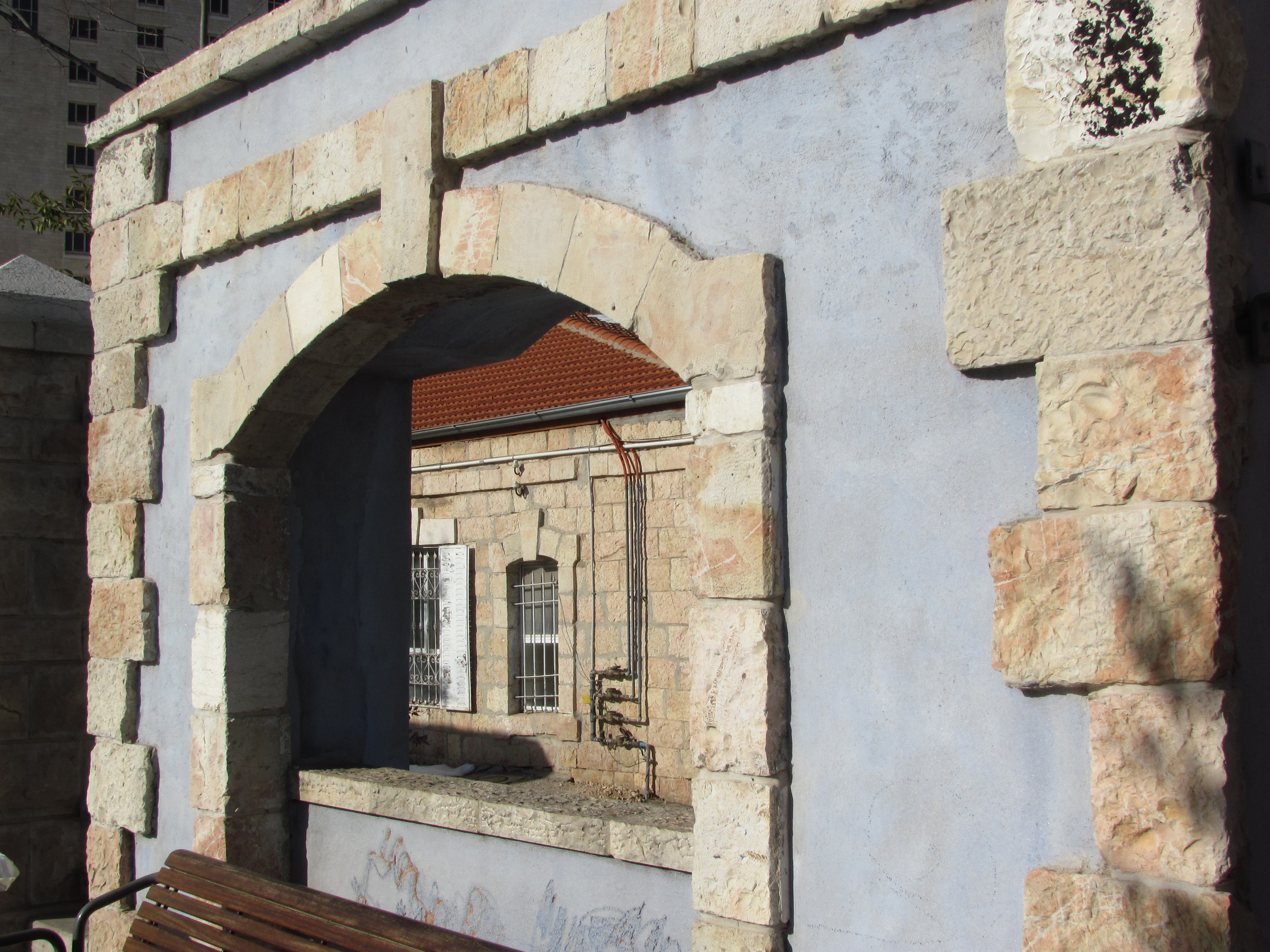
Historic home in Sha'arei Yerushalayim, seen through a concrete memorial containing one of the original window frames of buildings razed in preparation for the Jerusalem Light Rail.

Sha'arei Yerushalayim (Hebrew: שערי ירושלים, Gates of Jerusalem) is a former courtyard neighborhood in western Jerusalem. It is one of a series of courtyard neighborhoods built along Jaffa Road in the late 19th and early 20th centuries, together with Ohel Shlomo and Batei Saidoff. Today it is considered part of the Mekor Baruch neighborhood.

== Location ==
The neighborhood is bounded by Jaffa Road to the south, Tashbetz Street to the west, Rashi Street to the north, and HaTurim Street to the east.

== Name ==
Sha'arei Yerushalayim was so-named because at the time of its founding, it was the closest neighborhood to the entrance to the city. It was popularly known as "Abu Bessel" (Arabic for "Father of Onions") in honor of its founder, Yitzchak Lipkin, who also dealt in vegetables and supplied onions to other vegetable dealers.

== History ==
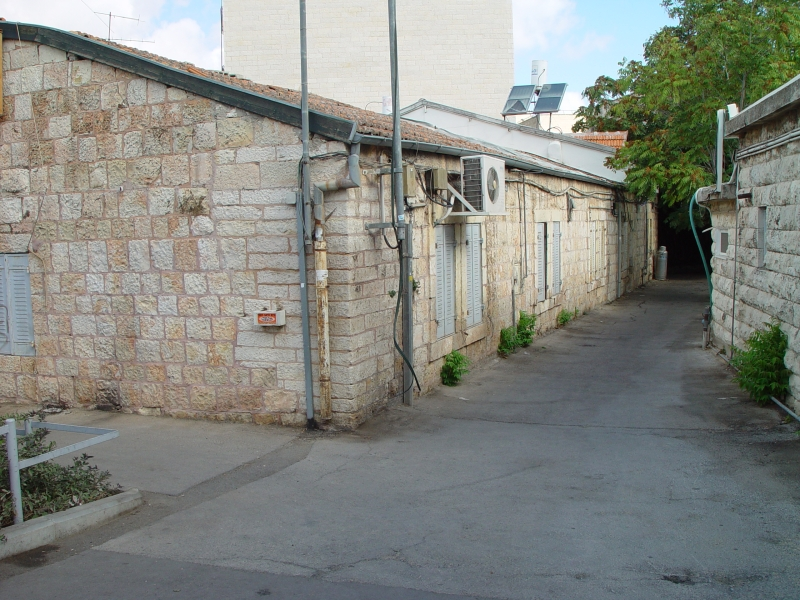
Original homes in Sha'arei Yerushalayim

Sha'arei Yerushalayim was established in 1891 by Yitzchak Lipkin (1834–1927), a Russian Jewish immigrant businessman. Lipkin opposed the halukka system of welfare handouts, encouraging Jerusalem residents to support themselves by their own labor. To that end, he provided financing for the Sha'arei Yerushalayim and Ohel Shlomo neighborhoods on the northern side of Jaffa Road, and sold houses to individuals with easy payment terms.

Slated to accommodate approximately 40 homes, Sha'arei Yerushalayim was designed as an "open courtyard" with one- and two-story buildings on all four sides and access ways between them. Two reservoirs stood in the middle of the courtyard to collect rainwater during the winter; the water was apportioned to each family in the summertime. By 1892, 43 homes had been completed. In a 1916 census conducted by the office of the Histadrut, the number of homes in Sha'arei Yerushalayim was listed as 44, with a total of 187 occupants.

In its early years, the neighborhood was considered very beautiful. Homes were rented to Jewish families and many important people lived there. Within a decade of its establishment, two major public institutions opened in close proximity: the Sha'arei Zedek Hospital directly across the street in 1902, and the Sephardic Old Age Home for Men and Women further west on Jaffa Road in 1904.

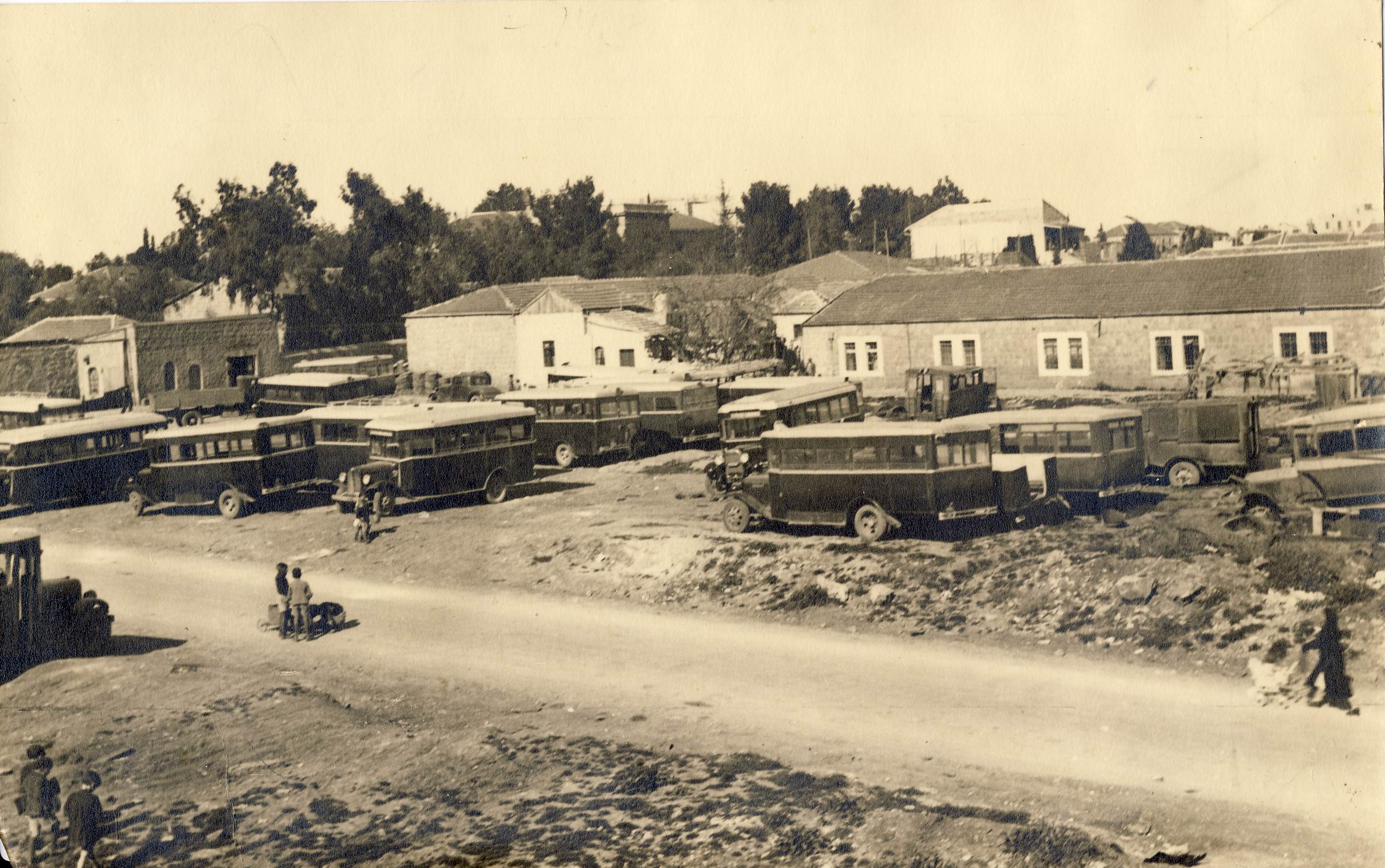
HaMekasher buses park next to the buildings of Sha'arei Yerushalayim, circa 1931–1939.

The first Jerusalem bus station was established on an open field opposite Sha'arei Yerushalayim (next to the Sha'arei Zedek Hospital) in 1931. Buses of the HaMekasher and Egged bus cooperatives operated out of a garage at this site until 1939, when the station was moved to a larger site in Kiryat Moshe.

In the census of 1938 conducted by the Vaad HaKehillah (the "Local Committee" of the Jewish community established by Mandate regulation), the population of Sha'arei Yerushalayim was recorded as 400 residents, mostly Sephardi Jews. In the latter part of the 20th century, some of the one-story homes in Sha'arei Yerushalayim were converted into workshops and yeshiva classrooms.

== Jerusalem Light Rail construction ==
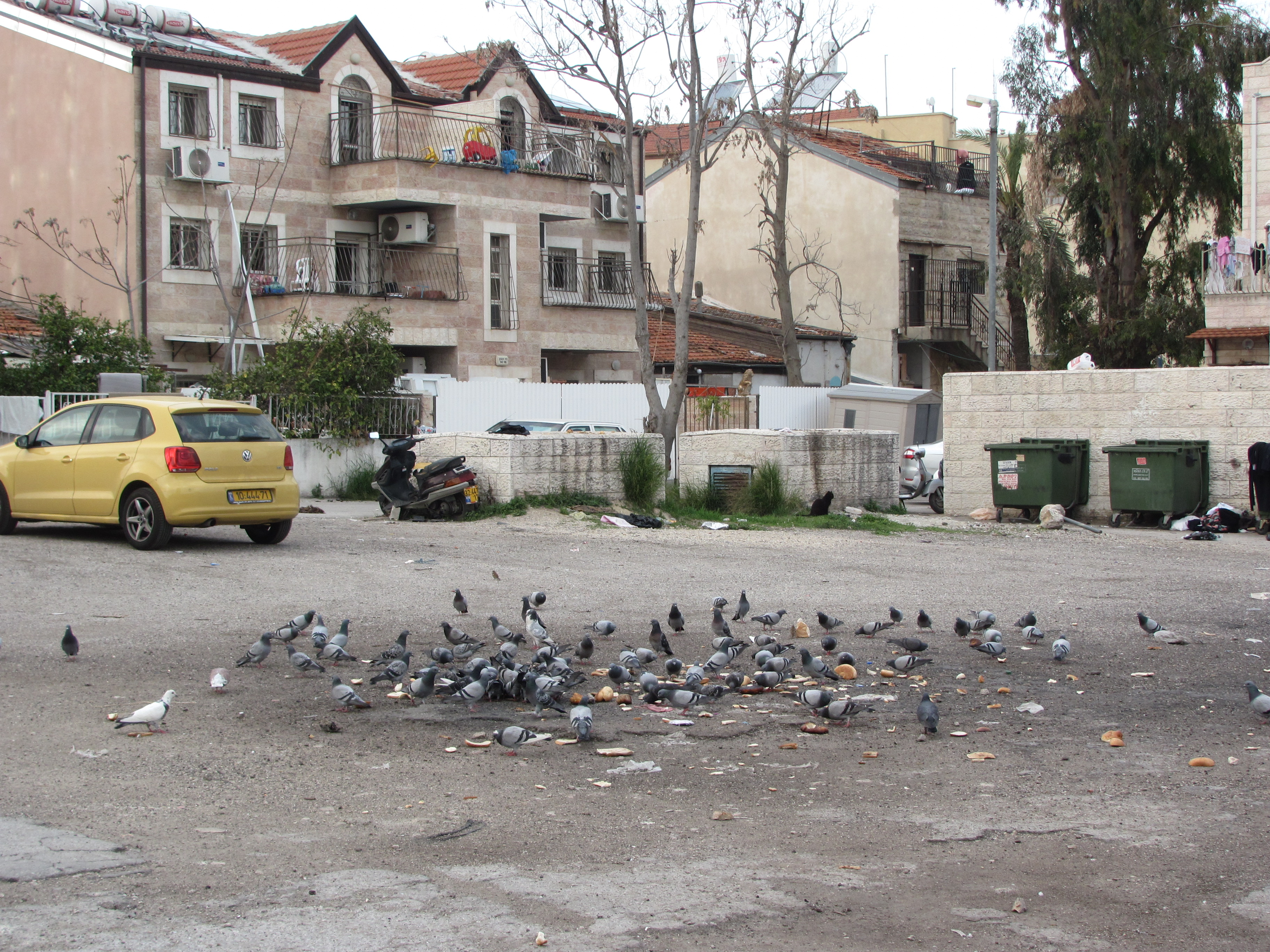
Former courtyard of the neighborhood, now a parking lot

In planning the route of the Jerusalem Light Rail, which began construction in 2002, the city planning authority debated how to preserve the historic buildings that line Jaffa Road while at the same time accommodate passengers and train operations. While buildings such as Batei Saidoff, located further east on Jaffa Road, were able to be preserved, the buildings of Sha'arei Yerushalayim and Ohel Shlomo that fronted Jaffa Road were determined to be beyond rehabilitation or preservation and were razed. Architects created a physical reminder of the historic homes by erecting in their place a concrete memorial inlaid with the original door and window frames of the destroyed buildings. To emphasize the shape of the frames, the surrounding wall was plastered in shades of turquoise, terracotta, and ochre.

== Sources ==
- Ben-Arieh, Yehoshua (1979). עיר בראי תקופה: ירושלים החדשה בראשיתה [A City Reflected in its Times: New Jerusalem – The Beginnings] (in Hebrew). Jerusalem: Yad Izhak Ben-Zvi Publications.
- Kroyanker, David; Wahrman, Dror (1983). Jerusalem Architecture, Periods and Styles: The Jewish Quarters and Public Buildings Outside the Old City Walls, 1860-1914. Jerusalem Institute for Israel Studies. ISBN 9652610194.
- Wager, Eliyahu (1988). Illustrated Guide to Jerusalem. The Jerusalem Publishing House.
