= Ladislaus Farkas =

Hungarian-Israeli physical chemist (1904 – 1948)

Ladislaus Farkas (Hungarian: Farkas László, Hebrew: לדיסלאוס פרקש) (May 10, 1904 – December 31, 1948, in Monte Argentario, Italy) was an Israeli chemist, of Austro-Hungarian origin, he was the founder of the Department of Physical Chemistry at the Hebrew University of Jerusalem.

== Education and career ==
Farkas was born in Dunajská Streda, Slovakia as the son of a pharmacist. In 1908, the family moved to Nagyvárad in Transylvania (today Oradea in Romania), where his father ran a pharmacy. The family attended a synagogue affiliated with Neolog Judaism. Farkas studied at the Gymnasium in Oradea, then spent two years at the Technische Hochschule in Vienna (now TU Wien). He continued his studies in Berlin where he entered the Kaiser Wilhelm Institute of Chemistry in 1924. His thesis supervisor was Karl Friedrich Bonhoeffer, with whom he established strong friendships. He obtained his doctorate in 1928 and was appointed personal assistant to the German chemist Fritz Haber that same year.

Pursuant to the German law on the restoration of the civil service of April 7, 1933, aimed at ridding the civil service of Jews, Farkas was dismissed by the director of the institute, Fritz Haber, on April 29, 1933. Haber submitted his own letter of resignation the following day and helped his Jewish colleagues settle abroad.

In 1935, he made Aliyah to Palestine and in 1936 founded a department of physical chemistry at the Hebrew University of Jerusalem which he directed until his death. During World War II, the group, led by Farkas, contributed to the British war effort. Farkas was secretary of the scientific advisory committee of the War Supply Council established by the British in 1942, coordinating all scientific research and development carried out in the country in the service of the British and the Allies in general during the war.

== Personal life ==
In 1940, Farkas married Hannah Aharoni (Aharonovich), a Moscow native and trained microbiologist. He was the father of two daughters, Liora and Ruth. His parents and young niece were murdered in the Holocaust. Her daughter Liora married David Kroyanker, an Israeli architect and architectural historian.

On December 31, 1948, Farkas embarked on a mission to the United States to buy equipment for the Israeli university and army. The special flight, which took off from Haifa, crashed at Monte Argentario in Tuscany. All 13 passengers and crew members, including Farkas, were killed. In Italy, a memorial service was held in their memory, and then Farkas was buried on the Har HaMenuchot cemetery in Jerusalem.

His personal archives are kept at the National Library of Israel.
