= 1984 Jaffa Road attack =

1984 terrorist attack

- Location: Jerusalem
- Date: 28 February 1984
- Attack type: Grenade attacks
- Deaths: 0
- Injuries: 21
- Perpetrators: DFLP and Abu Nidal, supported by PLO

On 28 February 1984, two hand grenades exploded outside a clothing store on Jaffa Road, a busy commercial street in Jerusalem, injuring 21 people.

== Attack ==
Jerusalem police said that four hand grenades were concealed in a bag that was planted near the store on Jaffa Road, but that only two of them exploded, at 9:40 a.m. Police said they had detained a number of Arab suspects in connection with the attack, while Israeli radio said that three Arabs who had been detained were later placed under arrest.

Responsibility for the attack was claimed by the Democratic Front for the Liberation of Palestine (DFLP) and the Abu Nidal Organization (ANO). The Palestine Liberation Organization (PLO) Chairman Yasser Arafat referred to the attack as a "military operation," and said that it "means that whoever thinks our Palestinian people can be stopped is mistaken because the Palestinian revolution is a giant."
