= Jaffa Road =

Major thoroughfare in Jerusalem

Coordinates: 31°47′11.19″N 35°12′36.39″E

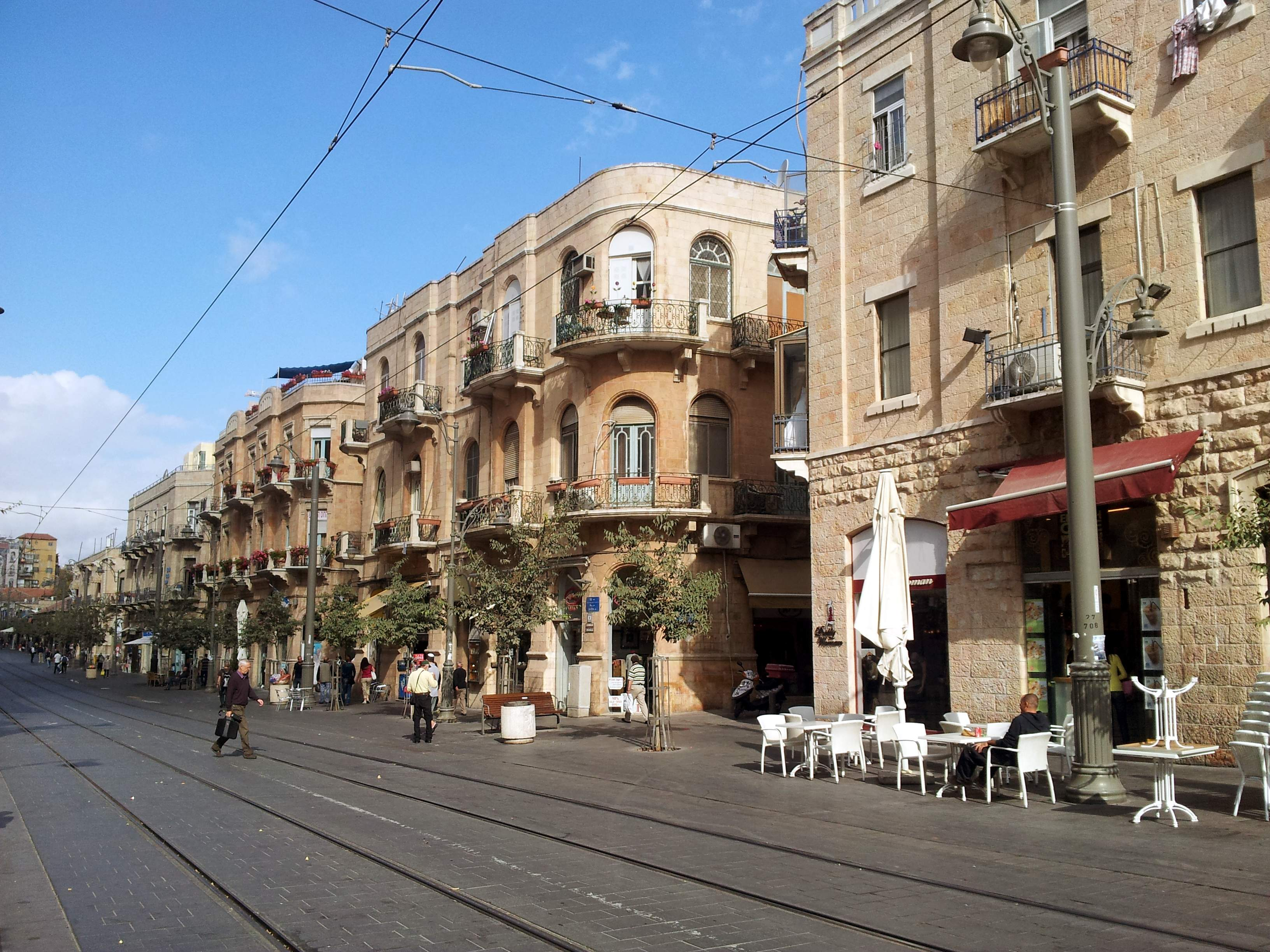
Jaffa road Jerusalem

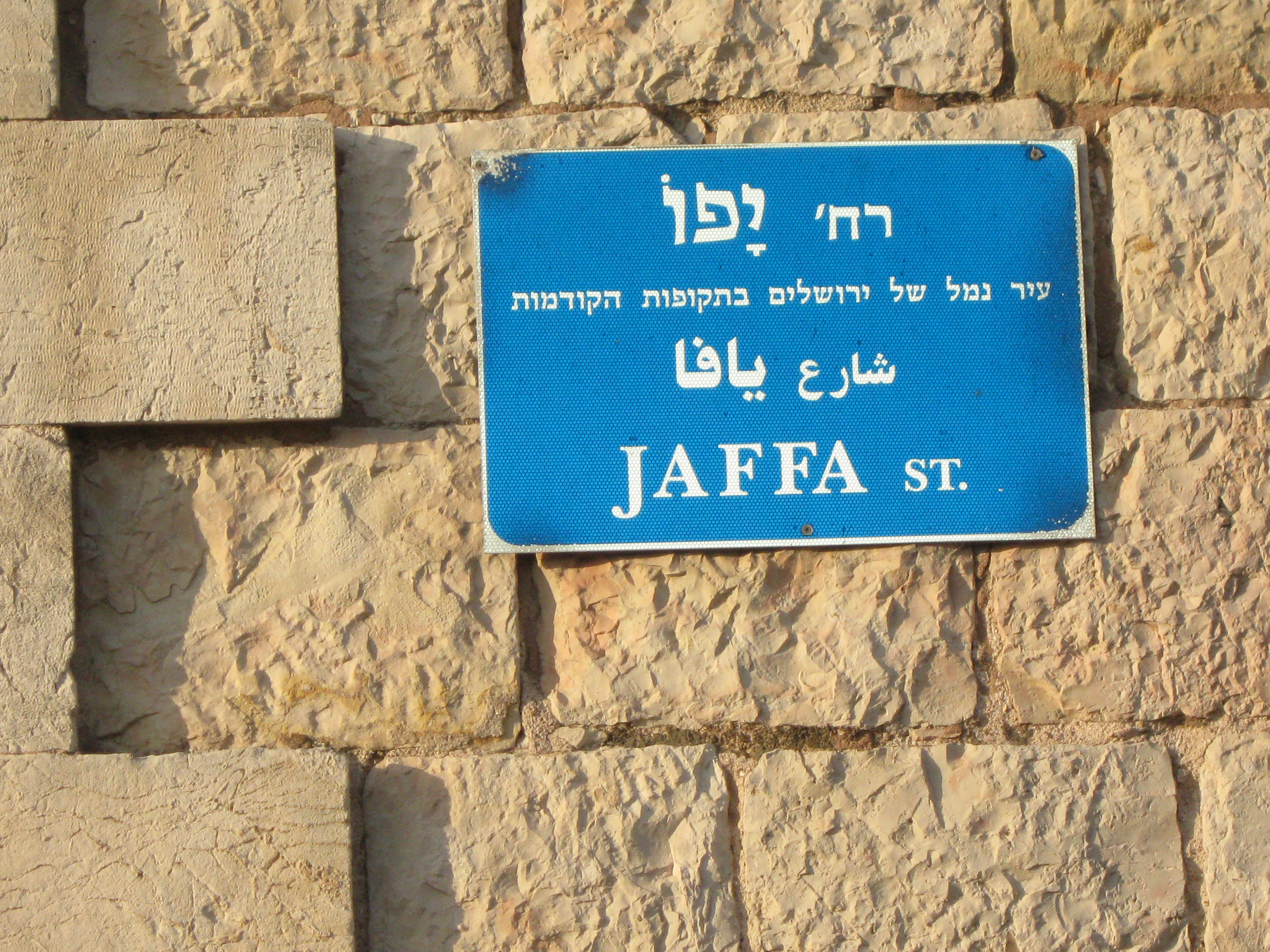
Reflective street sign commemorating Jaffa as the "port city of Jerusalem in ancient times"

Jaffa Road, also called Jaffa Street (Hebrew: רחוב יפו, romanized: Rehov Yaffo; Arabic: شارع يافا) is one of the longest and oldest major streets in Jerusalem. It crosses the city from east to west, from the Old City walls to downtown Jerusalem, the western portal of Jerusalem and the Jerusalem–Tel Aviv highway. It is lined with shops, businesses, and restaurants. It joins with Ben Yehuda Street and King George Street to form the Downtown Triangle central business district. Major landmarks along Jaffa Road are Tzahal Square (IDF square), Safra Square (city hall), Zion Square, Davidka Square, the triple intersection (Hameshulash) at King George V Street and Straus Street, the Ben Yehuda Street pedestrian mall, the Mahane Yehuda market, and the Jerusalem Central Bus Station. Most of Jaffa Road has been redeveloped as a car-free pedestrian mall served by the Jerusalem Light Rail. The Jerusalem–Yitzhak Navon railway station is located directly adjacent to the Central Bus Station.

== History ==
Originally paved in 1861 as part of the highway to Jaffa, the road quickly became a focal point for the 19th century expansion out of Jerusalem's Old City walls, and early neighbourhoods like the Russian Compound, Nahalat Shiva, and Mahane Yehuda blossomed around it, as well as Shaare Zedek hospital. Proximity to the artery quickly became a measure of real-estate value in the booming city. Traffic originally consisted of camels and mules, and the route was eventually improved enough to allow for horse-drawn carriages. The German Templers, who established the German Colony, first began a regular carriage service along the road to Jaffa.

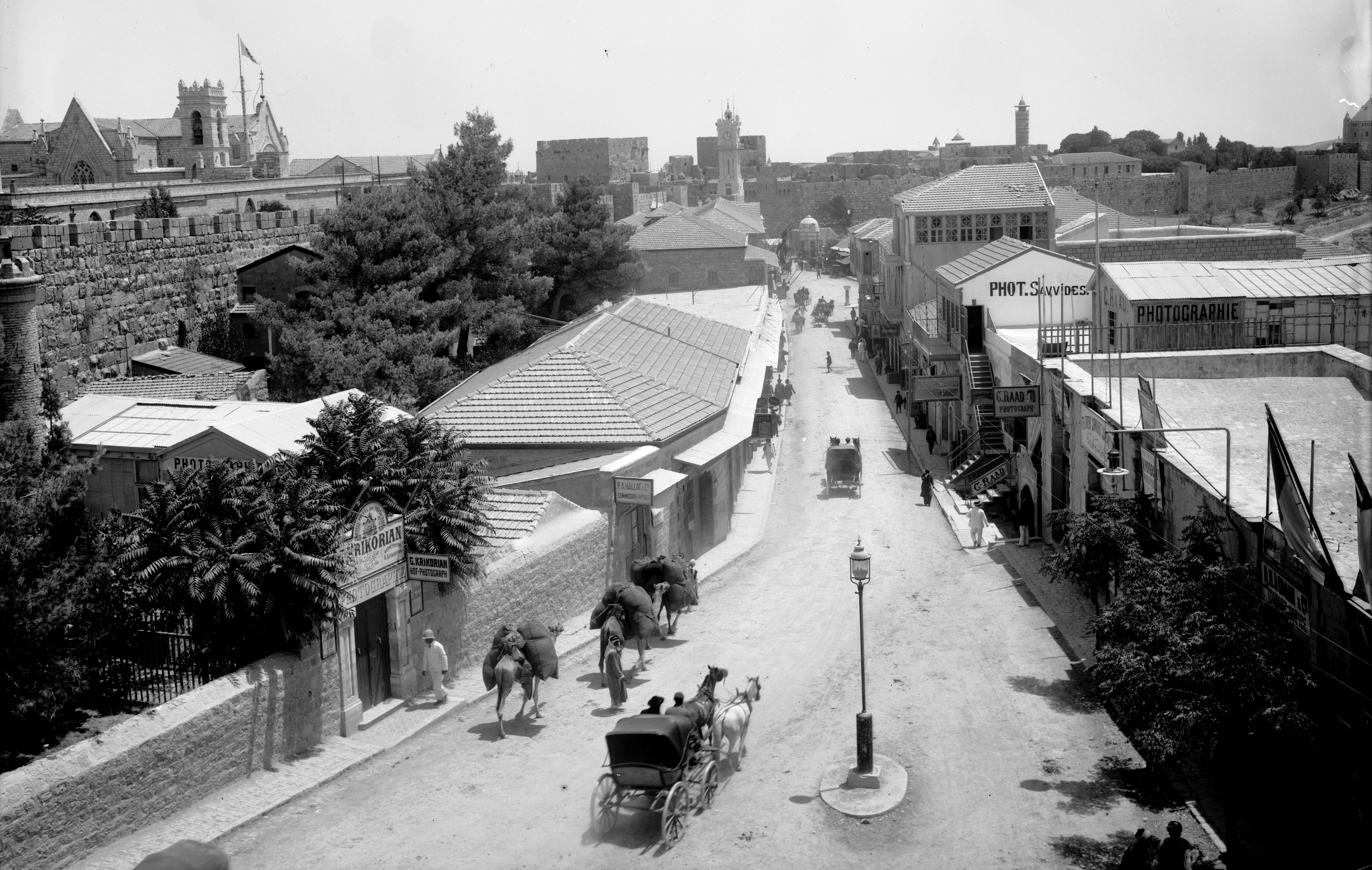
Jaffa Road after 1907

During the period of the British Mandate, the street was further developed with the establishment of many central institutions including the city hall, the city's central post office, the Anglo-Palestine Bank, and the Generali office building. The buildings on its easternmost end constructed along the Old City walls were destroyed in July 1944 so as not to obscure the city's historic view. During this period the street took on its modern shape, and it became the heart of the city's developing central business district as most commerce left the Old City. During the city's 19-year division between Israel and Jordan after the 1948 Arab–Israeli War, which separated the Old City from much of modern Jerusalem, Jaffa Road's primacy as the city-centre was unchallenged.

The Jerusalem Municipality, Jerusalem's main post office, the Mahane Yehuda Market are located on Jaffa Road. As a bustling thoroughfare, it has been targeted by terrorist groups and some of the most devastating terrorist attacks from the late 1960s onward have been carried out on this street, among them the Zion Square refrigerator bombing (1975), the 1984 Jaffa Road attack, the Jaffa Road bus bombings (1996), the Sbarro restaurant suicide bombing (2001), and the Jaffa Street bombing (2002).

For much of its hundred-year existence, Jaffa Road has served as Jerusalem's central artery. The municipality responded to problems in the struggling city-centre through focused efforts to redevelop the street; Jaffa Road was limited to public transit (buses and taxis) in an attempt to divert traffic congestion from the area, and became the centrepiece of a new development plan for revitalising the downtown. A tunnel was excavated under the street at Tzahal Square in 2004 to allow the city's central north–south route to bypass it. In order to accommodate the new system, new utility lines were laid under one side of the road, which was also widened. 180 properties were evacuated to allow for the road's improvement.

The Jerusalem Light Rail began operating in 2011. At the western end of Jaffa Road, opposite the Central Bus Station, it passes over Jaffa Road via Santiago Calatrava's Chords Bridge, which serves as an architectural beacon for the area.

== Archaeology ==
Salvage excavations along a stretch of Jaffa Road opposite the International Convention Center uncovered a ceramic factory that operated from the Hasmonean period through the destruction of Jerusalem and beyond, roughly the 2nd century BCE to the 2nd century CE. It remained active after Jerusalem's fall, supplying building materials to Legio X Fretensis, stationed in the ruined city. Among the finds is an inscription mentioning "Hananiah bar Daedalus mi-Yerushalayim," that is, "Hananiah son of Daedalus from Jerusalem." Aaron Demsky reconstructs Hananiah as a Jewish craftsman from the suburbs of Jerusalem during the late Second Temple period. All in all, the inscription incorporates a Jewish Hebrew name, Hananiah; the word "bar," meaning "son" in Aramaic but commonly used in this period by Hebrew speakers; a Greek name indicating either a patronym or a professional eponym inspired by the mythological craftsman Daedalus; and then the name of Jerusalem in its full Hebrew form, which is the common spelling today.

== Significant buildings and landmarks ==
East to west on historical Jaffa Road:

- Jaffa Gate
- Jerusalem Old Town Hall
- Safra Square with the Jerusalem Municipality complex
- Bank Leumi (former Anglo-Palestine Bank) main branch building, by architect Erich Mendelsohn
- Central Post Office Building (Jerusalem), by architects Austen Harrison and Percy Harold Winter
- Generali Building, by leading Fascist architect Marcello Piacentini
- Russian Compound borders to the south on Jaffa Road
- Zion Square
- Mashiach Borochoff House, 1908 villa
- Davidka Square
- Zoharei Chama Synagogue
- Mahane Yehuda Market
- Ohel Shlomo, former courtyard neighborhood, partially demolished
- Sha'arei Yerushalayim, former courtyard neighborhood, partially demolished and the adjacent Batei Saidoff (Saidoff Houses)
- Shaare Zedek hospital (old building, 1902–1980, aka "Wallach" or "Amsterdam Hospital")
- Jerusalem Central Bus Station and the adjacent Jerusalem–Yitzhak Navon railway station
- Chords Bridge (2008) by architect Santiago Calatrava

== Gallery ==
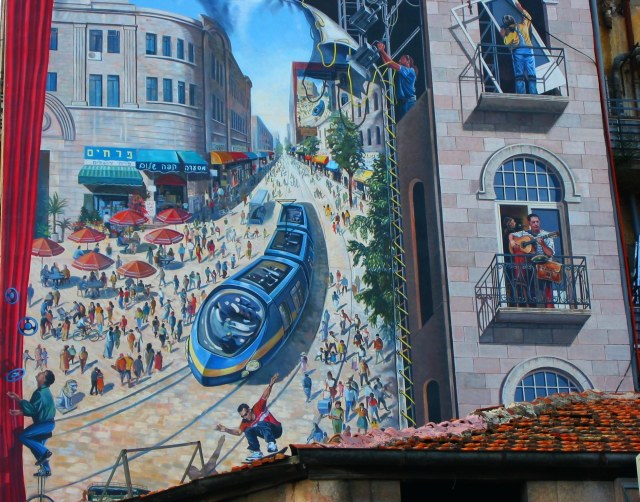
A mural on Jaffa Road depicting artist's vision of the Jerusalem Light Rail in operation.

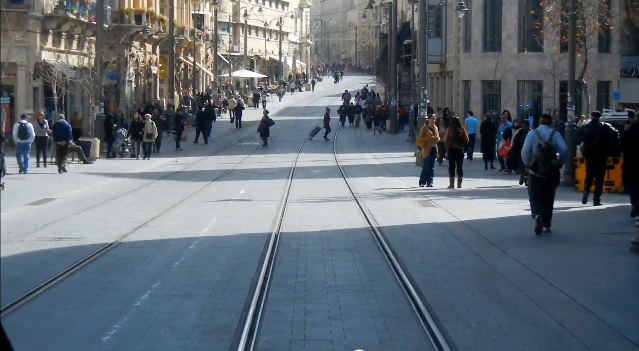
Jaffa road Jerusalem

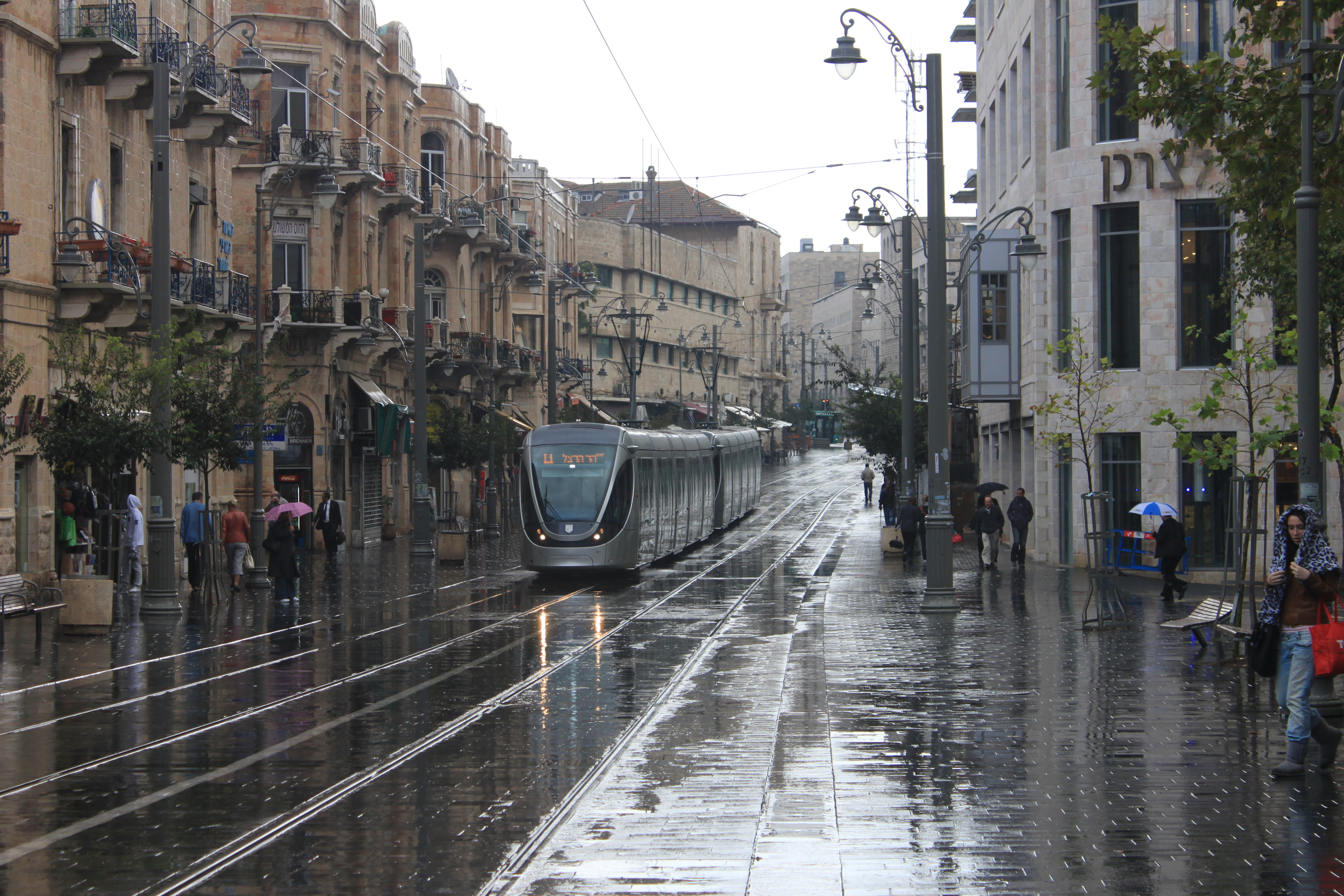
Jaffa Road in the rain

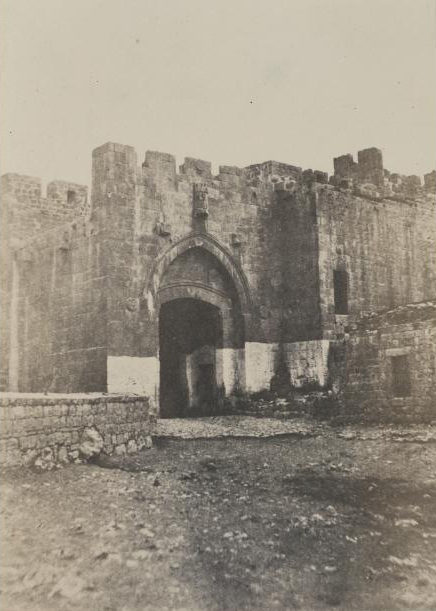
Interior of Jaffa Gate in 1856

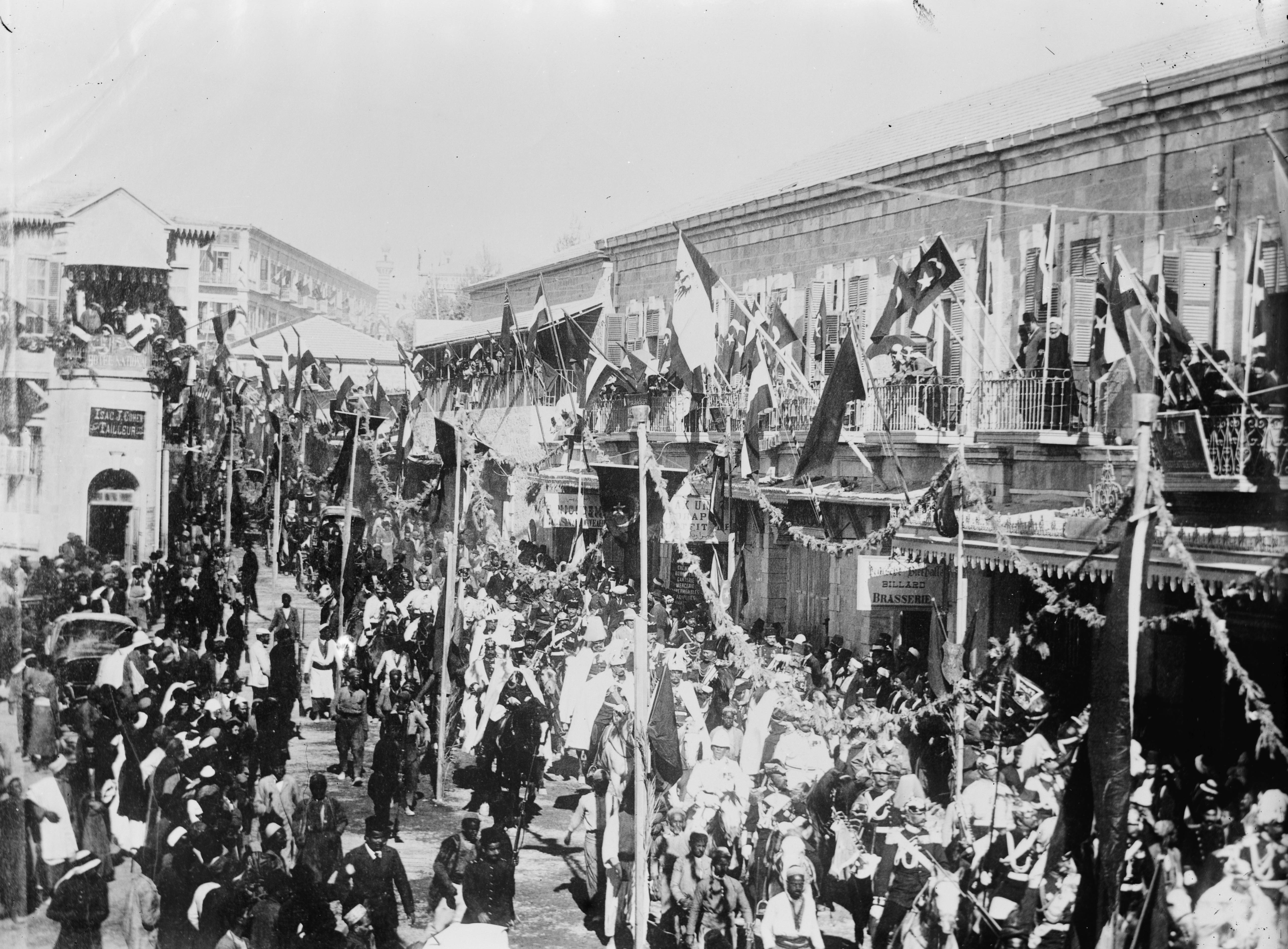
Visit of Wilhelm II of Germany, 1898

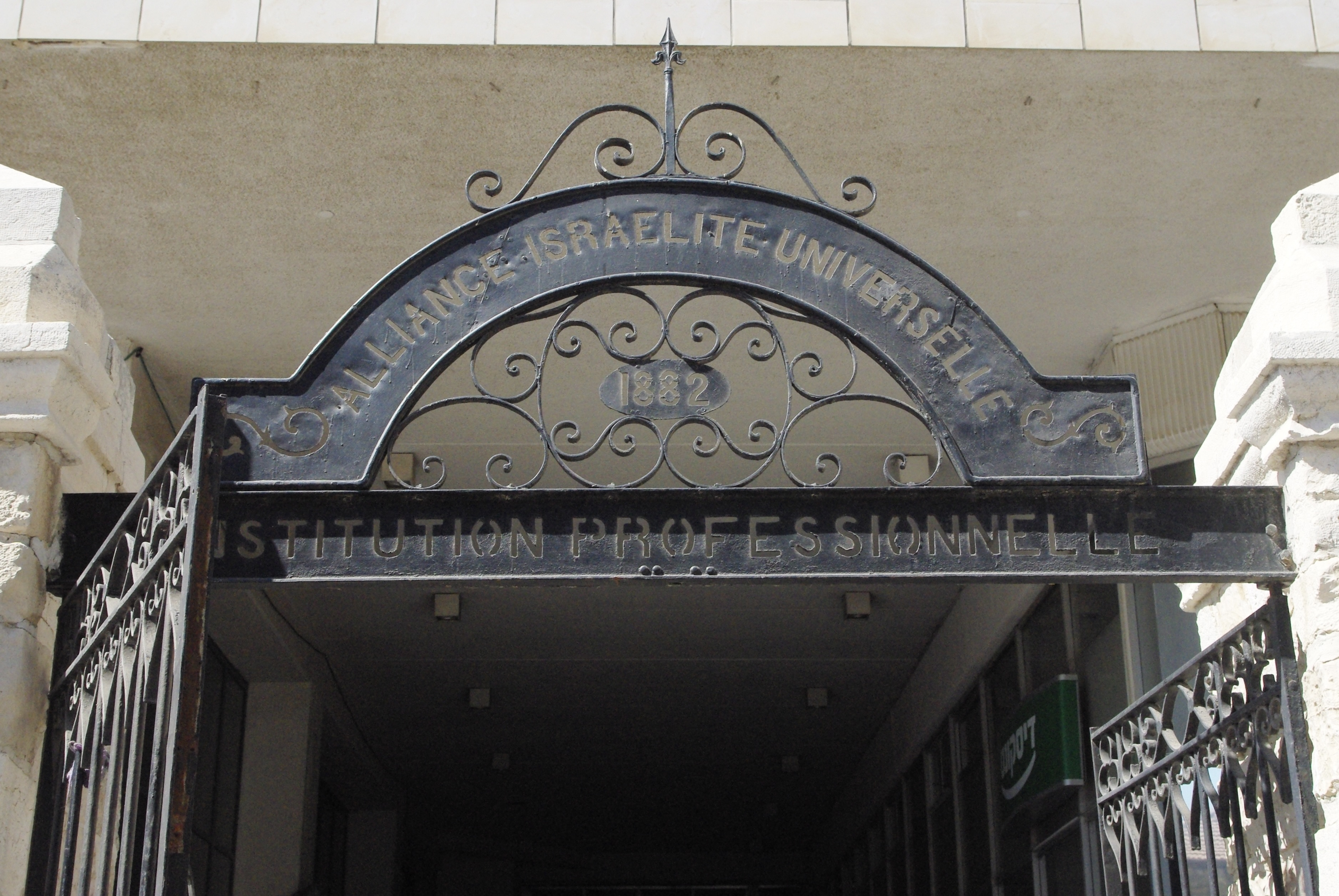
Gate of the school of Alliance israélite universelle (1882), on Jaffa Road

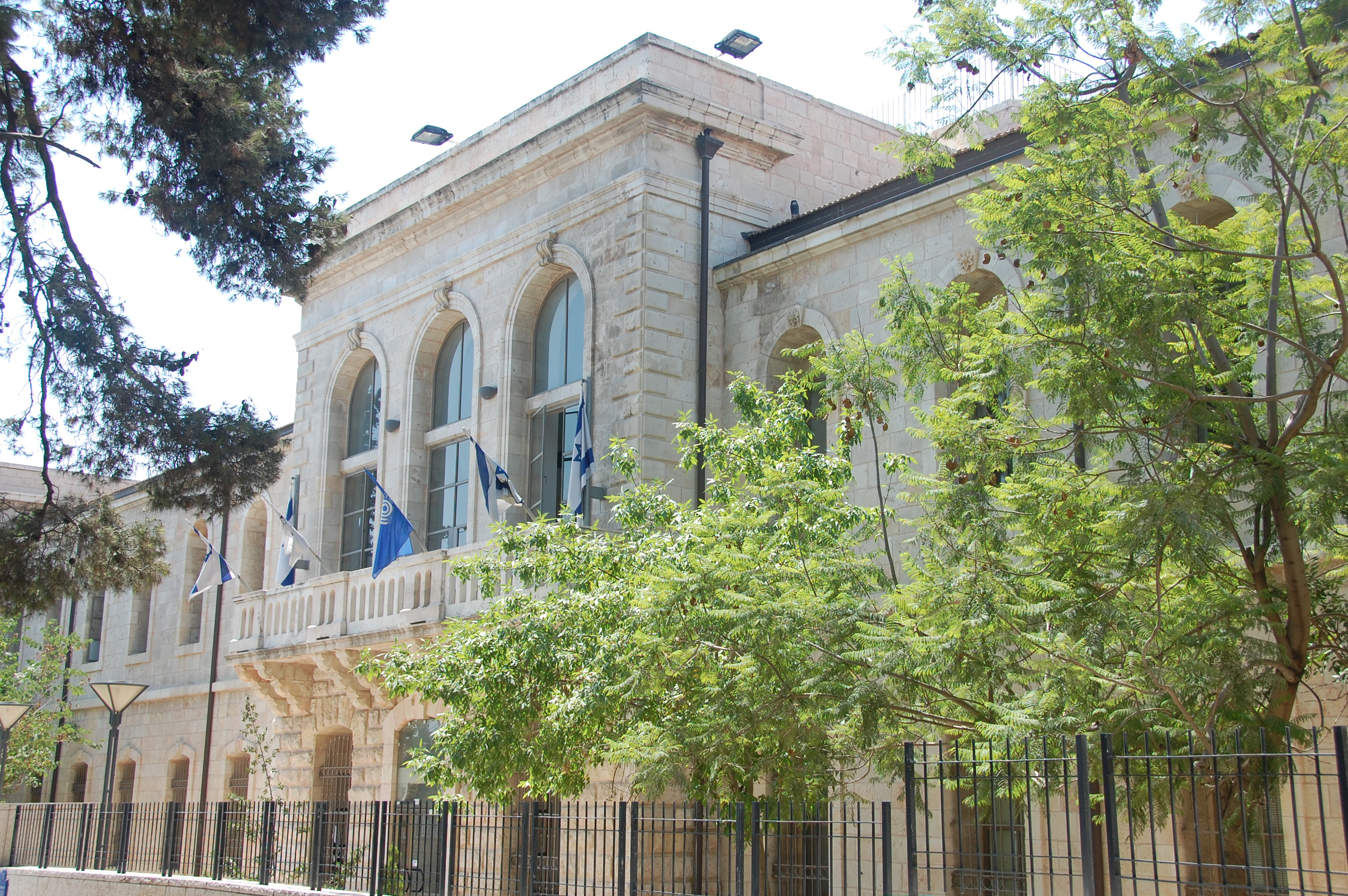
Original Shaare Zedek hospital building on Jaffa Road, now headquarters of the Israel Broadcasting Authority

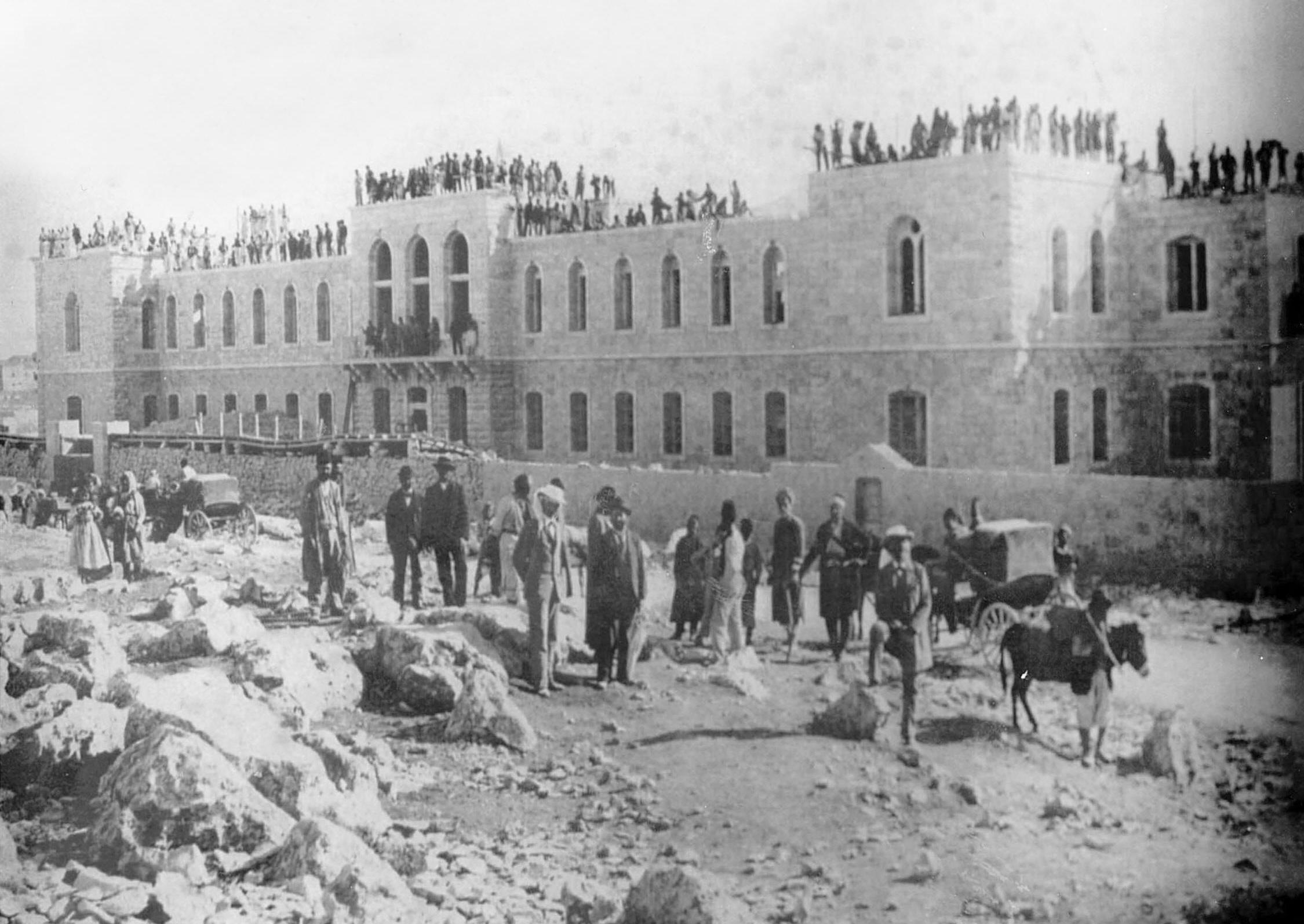
Groundbreaking for the original Shaare Zedek hospital, 1901.

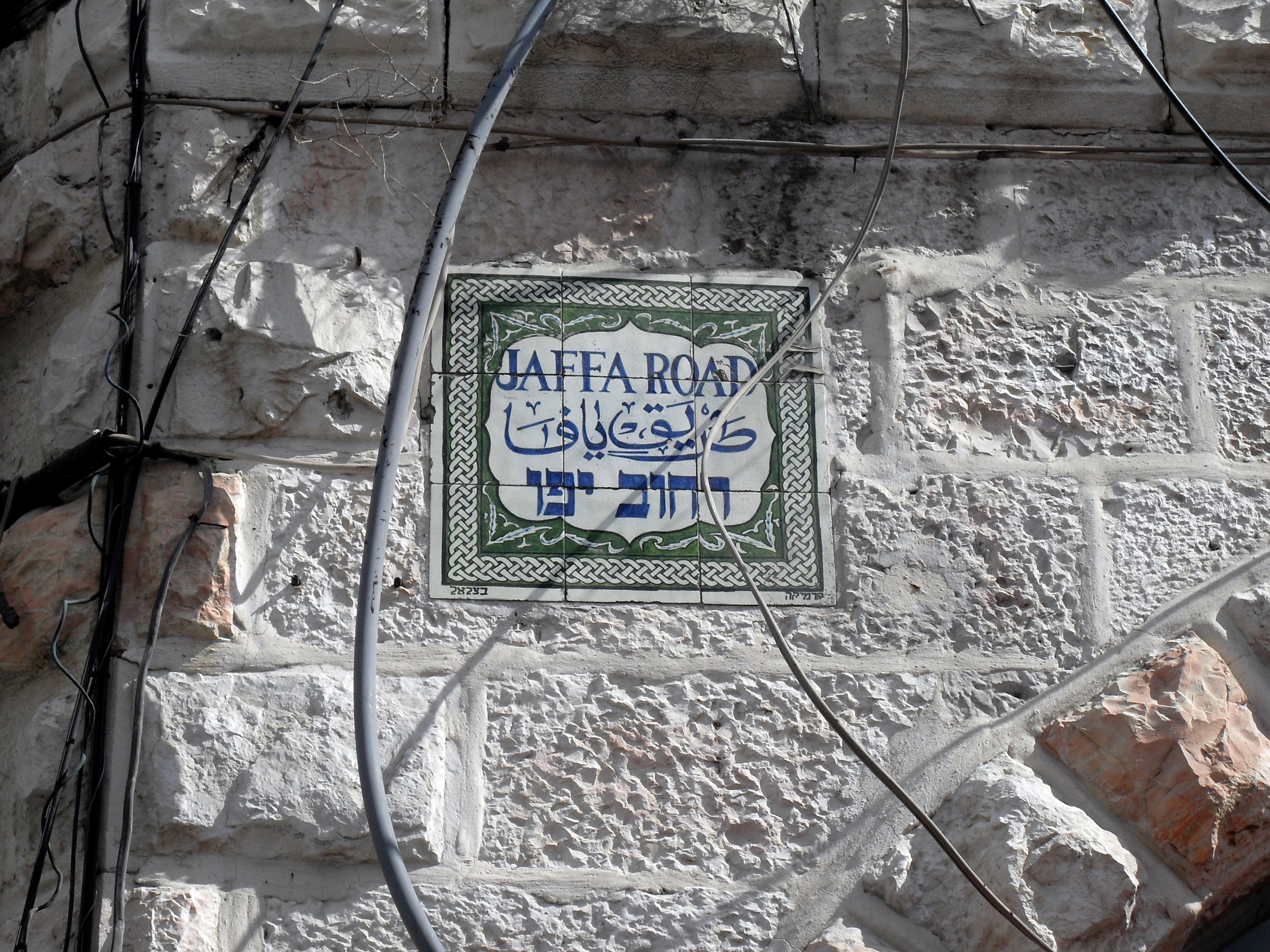
A fancy street sign, designed by the artists of the Bezalel Academy of Arts and Design in the 1920s.

== See also ==
- Expansion of Jerusalem in the 19th century
