= David Kroyanker =

Israeli architectural historian (1939–2025)

- דוד קרויונקר
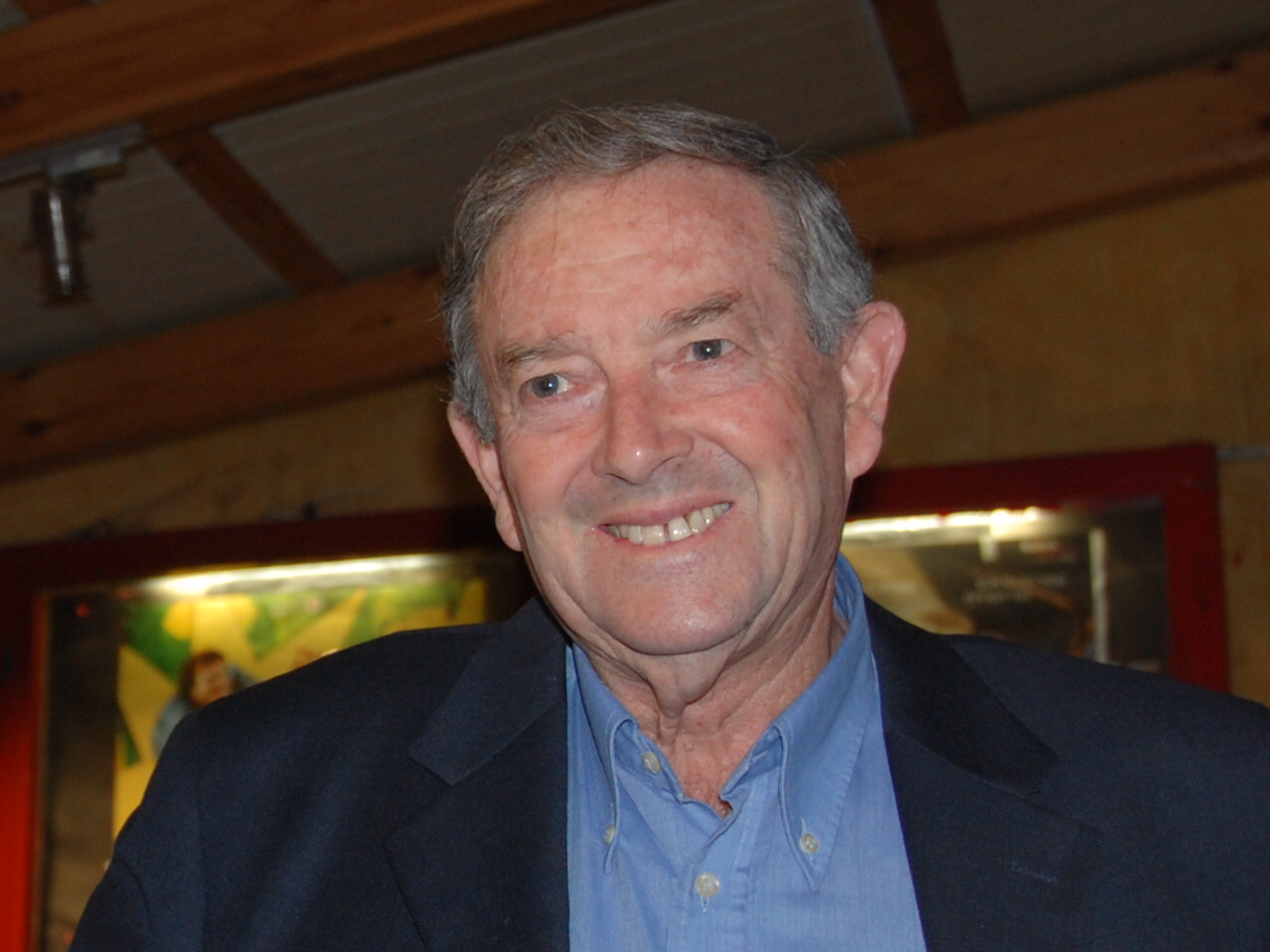
- Kroyanker in 2008
- Born: Daṿid Ḳroyanḳer; 1939; Jerusalem, Mandatory Palestine
- Died: 20 September 2025 (aged 86); Tel-Aviv, Israel
- Known for: Jerusalem architectural historian
- Spouse: Leora Farkash-Himzli
- Children: 2 daughters
- Parent(s): Gustav Krojanker; Edith Krojanker
- Relatives: Ladislaus Farkas (father-in-law)
- Awards: Teddy Kollek Award (2006); Yakir Yerushalayim (2010)

David Kroyanker (Hebrew: דוד קרויונקר; 1939 – 20 September 2025) was an Israeli architect and architectural historian of Jerusalem. He wrote dozens of popular books about Jerusalem neighborhoods, streets, and buildings, and urban planning.

== Life and career ==
Kroyanker was born and raised in the Rehavia neighborhood of Jerusalem. His father, Gustav Krojanker, was a German Zionist activist, journalist and art researcher. His mother, Edith Krojanker, was a lawyer in the public sector. His father died of cancer when Kroyanker was six years old.

He attended a high school located next to the Hebrew University of Jerusalem and served in the Paratroopers Brigade of the Israel Defense Forces from 1958 to 1961. Kroyanker studied at the Architectural Association School of Architecture in London from 1963 to 1968. He returned to Israel to work as an architect for a firm headed by David Resnick in Jerusalem, and moved to the urban planning department of the Jerusalem Municipality under Meron Benvenisti in 1970. From 1973 to 1981 he worked in various planning departments in the municipality, including the Department of Urban Planning and the Special Projects Unit Planning Department.

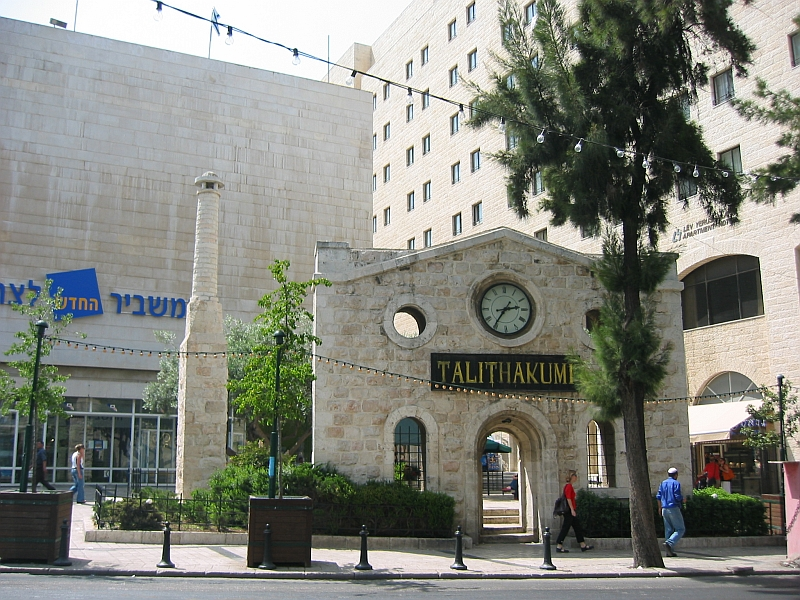
Talitha Kumi memorial.

Specializing in building preservation and rehabilitation, Kroyanker set about documenting the historical and architectural record of Jerusalem in order to build public awareness and support for preservation efforts. Among the many campaigns that he was involved in to save historic buildings was the battle to save the Talitha Kumi school building in downtown Jerusalem. The school was ultimately torn down in 1980; Kroyanker was part of the team that designed a memorial to the bulldozed structure using pieces of the original facade. Kroyanker is credited with the successful preservation and restoration of the Ticho House.

To aid the public campaigns, Kroyanker wrote a series of booklets spotlighting the "architectural and historical value of the streets and buildings". These booklets were so well-received that he began documenting the history and architecture of Jerusalem for a large-format book series, producing a book every other year at his next post, the Jerusalem Institute for Israel Studies, where he became an architectural historian and documenter in 1981. By 1994 he had completed a six-volume series titled Architecture in Jerusalem, with the first five 500-page volumes documenting architecture in Jerusalem's New City and the last volume covering buildings and streets in the Old City. The first volume only was translated into English, French, German, and Italian under the title Jerusalem Architecture. These six volumes, in turn, laid the foundation for an additional 15 large-format books.

As of 2010, Kroyanker has written more than 30 books on the neighborhoods and buildings of Jerusalem, 20 of which became mass-market bestsellers. His works are richly illustrated with historic photographs, maps, sketches, and original street and neighborhood plans. His wife, Leora, actively assisted him by editing and proofreading texts.

As a result of his research, Kroyanker has amassed the largest private archive in the world of literary and visual documentation related to Jerusalem architecture. His files include historic photographs, drawings, documents, drawings, maps and newspaper clippings. The files are catalogued in three topic areas: neighborhoods, streets and buildings; architectural/planning (such as conservation, building styles, architectural details, and biographies of architects); and planning processes (including demolition, new construction and urban development). He has also curated exhibitions, lectured, and led tours on Jerusalem's architectural heritage.

=== Personal life and death ===
Kroyanker married Leora Farkash-Himsley, daughter of Ladislaus Farkas, in 1969. They had two daughters. In 2012 the couple relocated to Tel Aviv.

Kroyanker died on 20 September 2025, after a lengthy illness. He was 86.

== Views and critical response ==
Kroyanker was openly critical of the urban degeneration in Jerusalem caused by poverty and neglect. He was also critical of the Orthodox Jewish demographic whose lower socioeconomic level, he claimed, has created a lack of aesthetics in Orthodox neighborhoods and weakened the economy by forcing the exodus of cinemas and "attractive shops" from the downtown area, replacing them with bargain stores.

Kroyanker's research has been criticized for its "nostalgic tone" and his exclusion of "more recent architectural phenomena such as the effect of the security barrier on the urban space, or the abundance of empty apartments in the center of town". He has also been accused of partiality toward the interests of city hall and real-estate developers. The Alrov Corp funded his book Mamilla: Prosperity, Decay and Renewal – the Alrov Mamilla Quarter (2009), and his book on the Hebrew University of Jerusalem campus at Givat Ram was written by request of the university.

== Awards ==
- 2006 The Teddy Kollek Lifetime Achievement Award
- 2010 Yakir Yerushalayim Award

== Selected bibliography ==
=== Books ===
- Developing Jerusalem, 1967-1975: The planning process and its problems as reflected in some major projects. Jerusalem Committee. 1975. (with Julian Louis Meltzer and Dorothea Shefer-Vanson)
- Jerusalem 1978: Between two decades. Jerusalem Committee. 1978. (with Yael Guiladi)
- Jerusalem Planning and Development, 1979-1982. Jerusalem Committee. 1982.
- Jerusalem Architecture, Periods and Styles: The Jewish quarters and public buildings outside the Old City walls, 1860–1914. Jerusalem Institute for Israel Studies. 1983. ISBN 9652610194. (with Dror Wahrman)
- Jerusalem: Planning and Development 1982-1985, New Trends. Jerusalem Committee. 1985.
- Jerusalem Architecture, Periods and Styles: European Christian buildings outside the Old City walls, 1855-1918 (in Hebrew). Keter. 1987.
- ירושלים - המאבק על מבנה העיר וחזותה [Jerusalem – The struggle over the city structure and its appearance] (in Hebrew). Kinneret Zmora-Bitan Dvir. 1988.
- Jerusalem Architecture. Vendome Press. 1994. ISBN 0865651477. 2nd edition published 2002
- The Russian Compound: Toward the Year 2000. From Russian Pilgrimage Center to a Focus of Urban Activity (in Hebrew). Jerusalem Municipality. 1997.
- Jerusalem: The Light Rail (in Hebrew). Keter. 2003.
- Jerusalem: The German Colony and Emek Refaim Street (in Hebrew). Keter. 2008.
- Mamilla: Prosperity, Decay and Renewal – the Alrov Mamilla Quarter (in Hebrew). Keter. 2009.
- Jaffa Road: Biography of a Street — Story of a City (in Hebrew). Keter. 2009.
- The Jerusalem Triangle: An Urban Biography (in Hebrew). Keter. 2011.
- The Jerusalem of Amos Oz: In the Footsteps of 'A Tale of Love and Darkness' and Other Works. Keter. 2019.

=== Articles ===
- "Heart and soul of Jerusalem". Haaretz. 4 January 2007. Archived from the original on 6 August 2011.
- "'Entrepreneur's dream, historian's nightmare'". Haaretz. 2 May 2006. Archived from the original on 11 March 2014.
- "Don't name it after me". Haaretz. 20 February 2006. Archived from the original on 3 November 2012.
- "Is a Jewish museum forbidden and a Muslim university permitted?". Haaretz. 10 January 2006. Archived from the original on 11 March 2014.
- "No man's land once again". Haaretz. 21 January 2005. Archived from the original on 11 March 2014.
- "Preservation, with reservations". Haaretz. 18 October 2002. Archived from the original on 27 February 2014.
- "Rising anew from the ashes". Haaretz. 14 November 2001. Archived from the original on 11 March 2014.
- "Fence and defense". Haaretz. 8 October 2001. Archived from the original on 21 April 2016.
- "Fifty Years of Israeli Architecture as Reflected in Jerusalem's Buildings". Israel Ministry of Foreign Affairs. 26 May 1999.
