= Jerusalem Institute for Policy Research =

Israeli think tank

Coordinates: 31.771733°N 35.214419°E

Jerusalem Institute for Policy Research non-profit

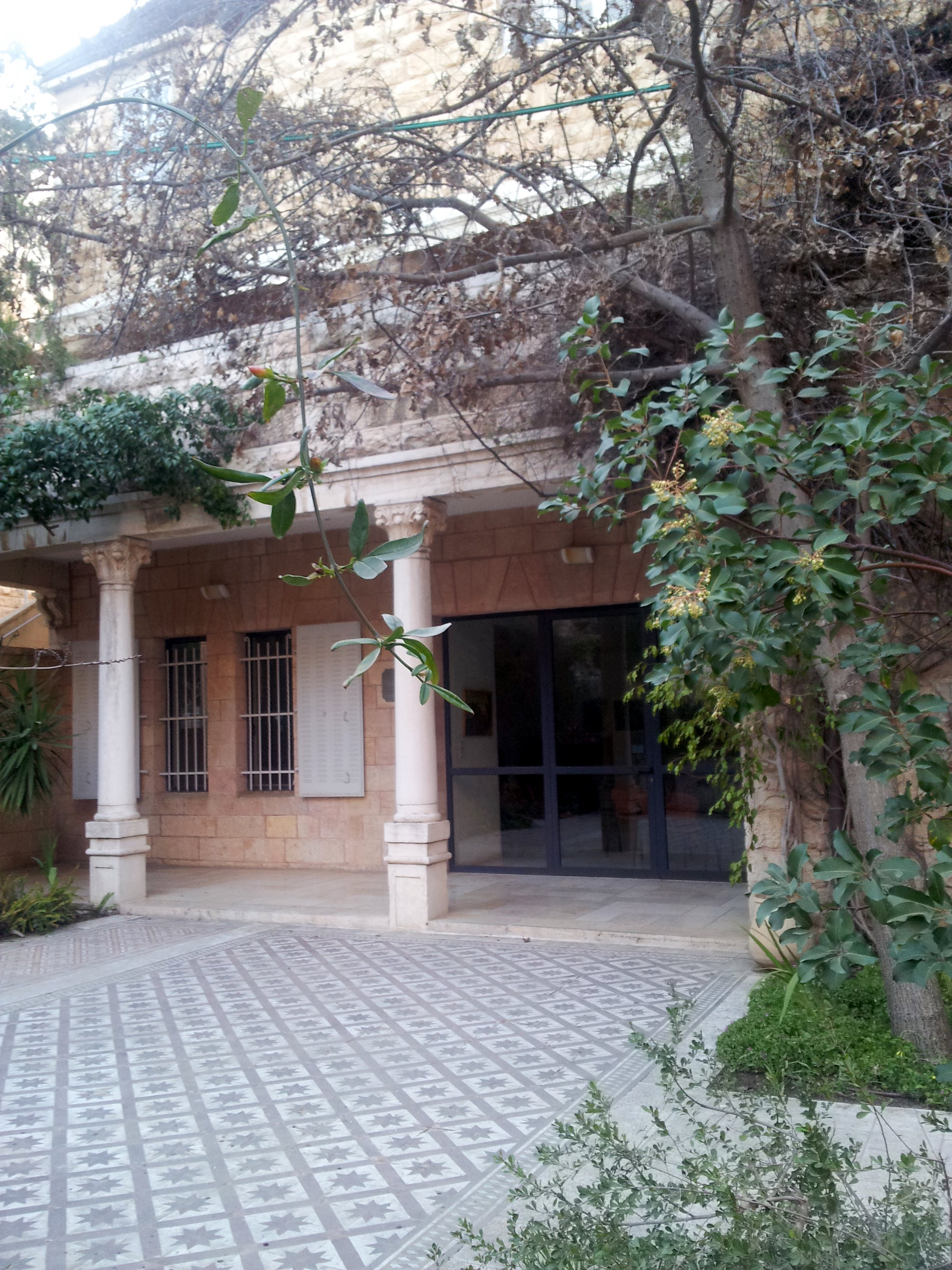
- Founded: 1978
- Type: 501(c)(3)
- Location: Jerusalem
- Method: Policy research
- Key people: Dr. David Koren (Director)
- Website: JIPR website

Jerusalem Institute for Policy Research (JIPR), formerly the Jerusalem Institute for Israel Studies, is an independent policy think tank located in Jerusalem. The institute conducts policy studies on Jerusalem, innovation policy (R&D), environmental policy and the management of the Israeli–Palestinian conflict. The institute's studies and recommendations serve as resources for governmental bodies, public institutions, civil organizations and the public.

== History ==
The Jerusalem Institute was founded in 1978 by Mayor of Jerusalem Teddy Kollek, in collaboration with the Jerusalem Foundation and the Hebrew University of Jerusalem. The first directors of the institute were David Amiran and Ora Ahimeir. Founding members included Avraham Harman, Haim Kobersky, Joshua Prawer and Baruch Yekutieli. David Koren is the institute's general director.

== Activities ==
The JIPR is an independent, apolitical research institute. Its mission is to contribute to decision-making, policy and planning processes and to influence their outcomes in Jerusalem and in Israel. To this end, it produces accurate, thorough and data-based information, conducts interdisciplinary policy-oriented research and provides innovative policy recommendations and planning proposals for the benefit of decision makers, the third sector and, ultimately, the public.

Since its founding, JIPR has issued over 400 publications, which contribute to the professional and public discourse pertaining to Jerusalem in particular and Israeli society in general. It publishes some 20 books and reports annually, including the Annual Statistical Yearbook of Jerusalem edited by Maya Choshen.

The "Peace Process in Jerusalem" (JIIS, 2000) served as a working paper at the 2000 Camp David Summit in July 2000 for the Israeli delegation.
