= Knesset Yisrael =

Name of a group of three former courtyard neighborhoods in central Jerusalem

Coordinates: 31°46′54″N 35°12′49″E

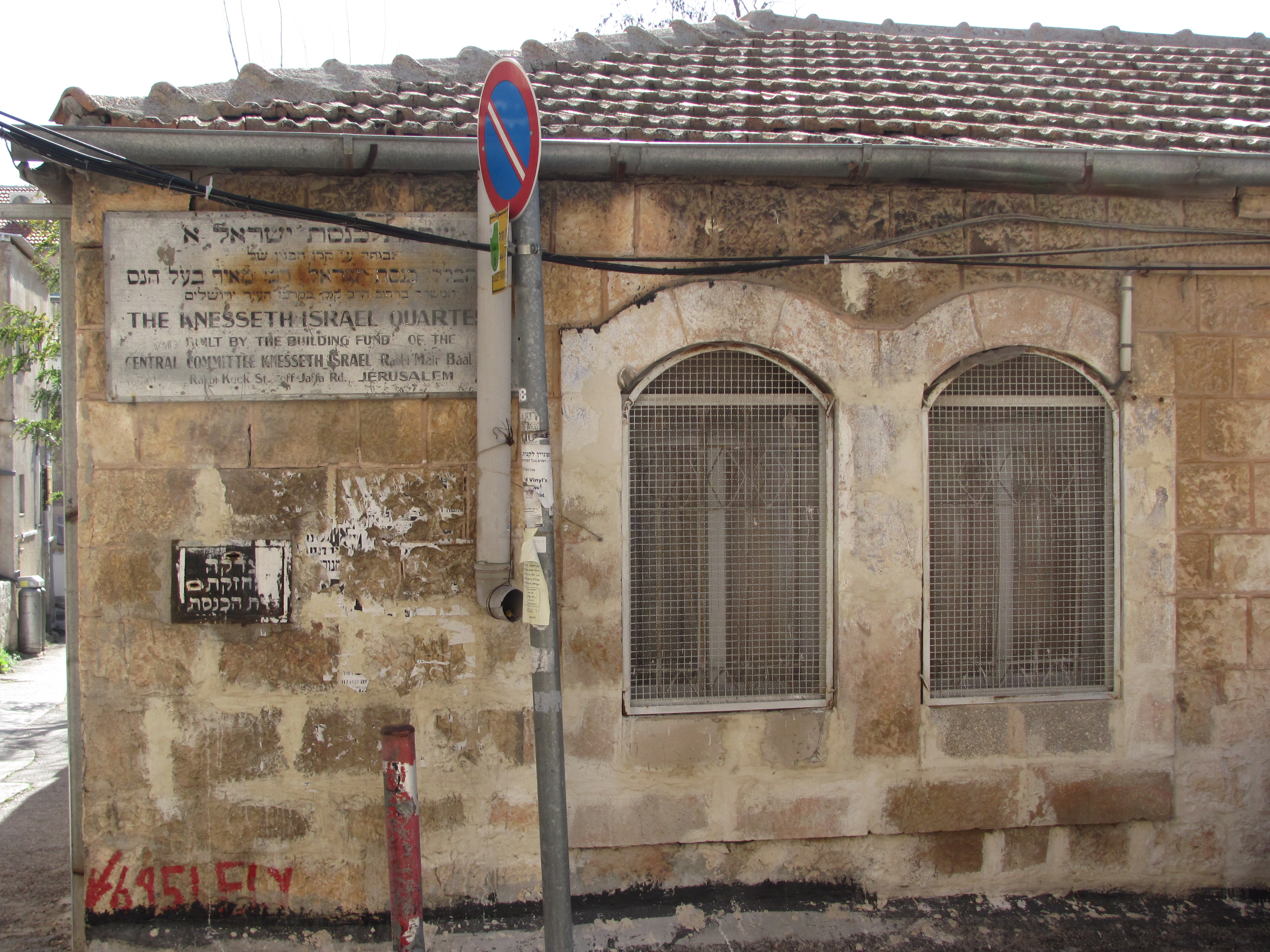
Neighborhood sign on Knesset Aleph row house

Knesset Yisrael (Hebrew: כנסת ישראל, Ashkenazi pronunciation: Knesses Yisroel, lit. 'Community of Israel'), also known as Knesset, is the name of a group of three former courtyard neighborhoods in central Jerusalem. Known as Knesset Aleph, Knesset Bet, and Knesset Gimmel (or Old Knesset, Middle Knesset, and New Knesset), the housing project was planned by the Vaad HaKlali Knesset Yisrael (Central Committee of Knesset Yisrael) and funded by overseas Jewish donors. The houses were completed in stages from 1892 to 1926. Beneficiaries of the housing were poor Haredi Ashkenazi families and Torah scholars connected to the Central Committee kolel system. Today Knesset Yisrael is part of the Nachlaot neighborhood.

== Name ==
The name Knesset Yisrael is a Talmudic expression referring to the Jewish people as a whole. (Note: See, for example, Genesis Rabbah 11:8; Esther Rabbah 3:2; Shir ha-Shirim Rabbah 3:1.)

== Location ==
The three neighborhoods of Knesset Yisrael – Knesset Aleph, Knesset Bet, and Knesset Gimmel – lie north of Betzalel Street and straddle both sides of HaNetziv Street.

== History ==
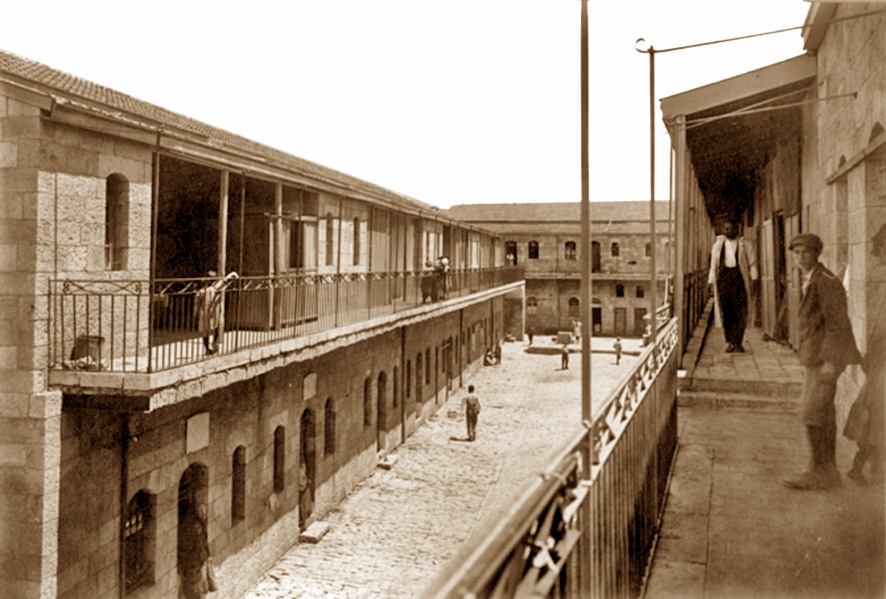
Knesset Bet, 1930s

In response to the overcrowded and unsanitary conditions in the Old City of Jerusalem, and the influx of new immigrants to Jerusalem in the late 19th century, 40 new neighborhoods were built outside the Old City walls between 1880 and 1900. Knesset Yisrael was one of the "kolel neighborhoods" built on behalf of European Ashkenazi immigrants who were being supported by charity funds collected from their countrymen. In 1888 the Central Committee, which oversaw the distribution of charity funds to Ashkenazi families, decided to purchase land and construct housing for its members.

Their chosen location – a parcel of land south of Jaffa Road and adjacent to the newly built Jewish neighborhoods of Mishkenot Yisrael and Mazkeret Moshe – turned out to be the site for the planned terminus of the Jaffa–Jerusalem railway. Land prices skyrocketed as Christian groups from Germany, Greece, and Armenia sought to establish neighborhoods adjacent to the train station. Hopelessly outbid, the Central Committee members tried to stall the legal proceedings in the Turkish municipality, and called on the Jewish community to engage in fasting and prayers in synagogues and by the graves of tzadikim in Jerusalem, Hebron, Safed, and Tiberias. Several months later, the French company building the railway announced that it had decided to move the Jerusalem station to a point further south. The Christian groups rushed to buy land at the new site (later known as the German Colony), and the Central Committee was able to purchase the property it wanted for the neighborhood of Knesset Yisrael.

=== Knesset Aleph ===
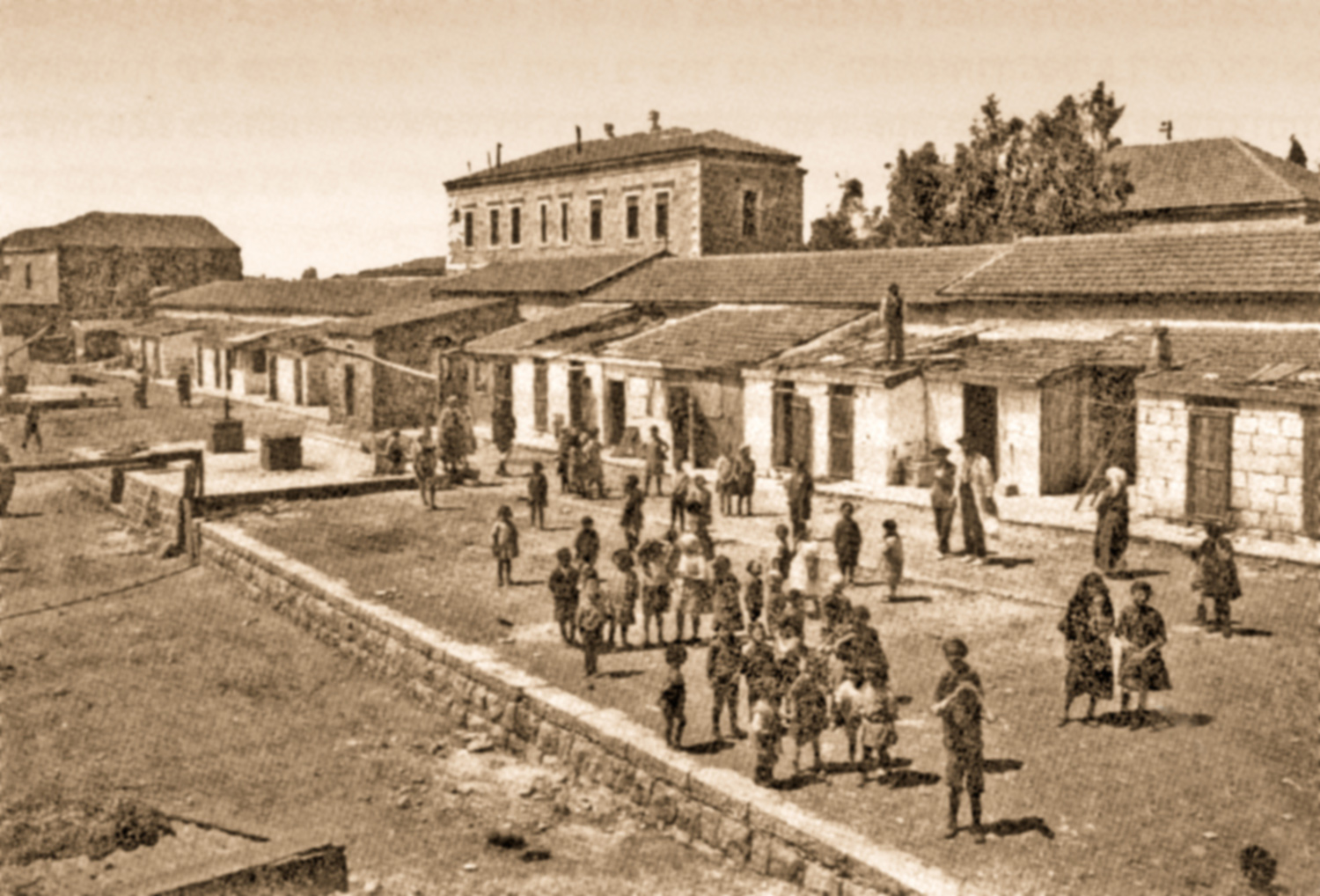
Knesset Aleph, 1930s

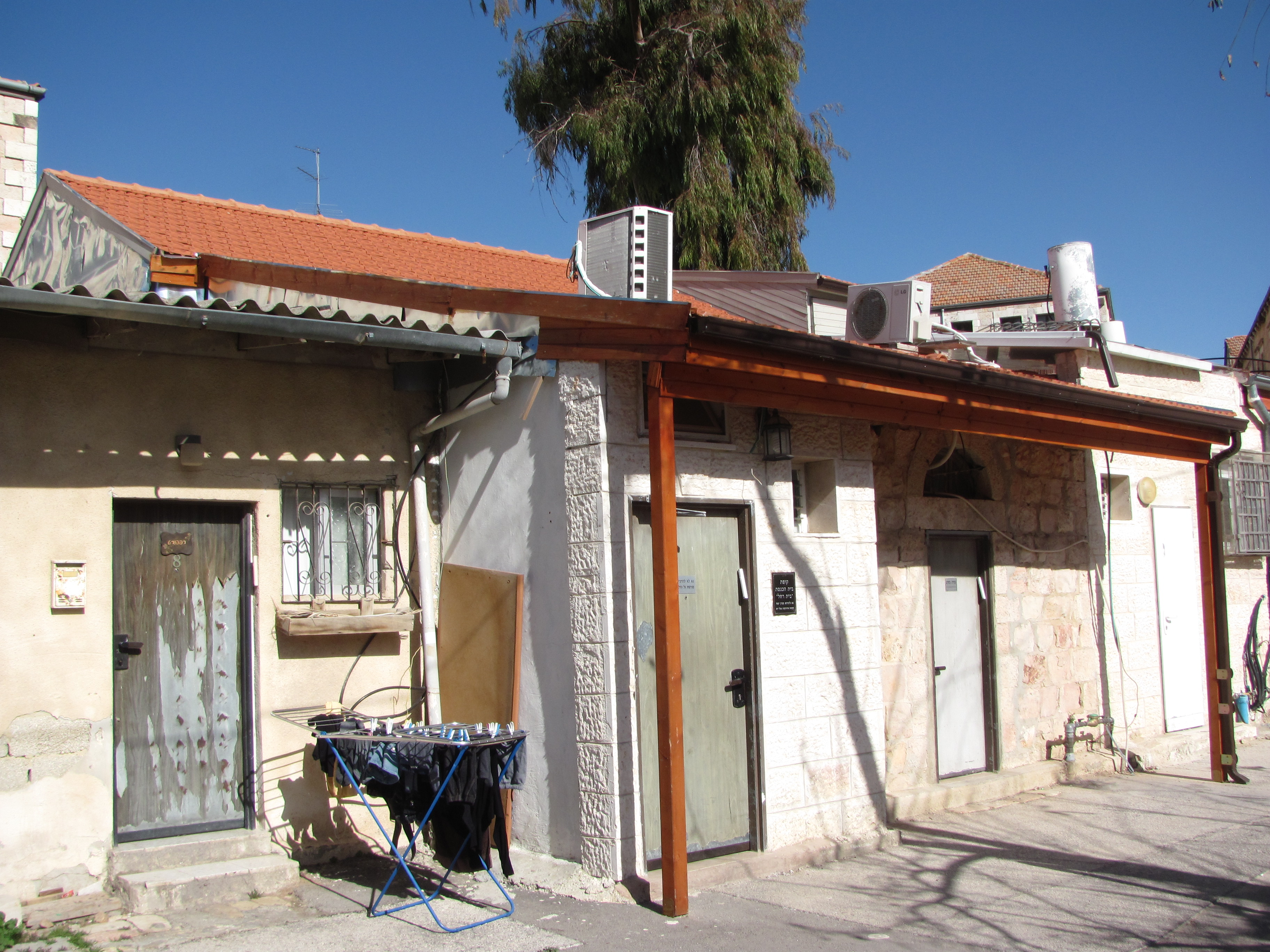
Beis Rachel Synagogue (center, with pergola)

The cornerstone for the first development, Knesset Aleph, was laid in September 1892, with construction extending over the next 10 years. By 1897, only 15 apartments were completed and occupied. The complex was completed in 1902 with 31 apartments built in one-story row houses on three sides of a rectangular courtyard; the eastern side was left open. The buildings were placed close together to maximize available land. Each apartment consisted of two rooms and a kitchen. Construction funds were provided by donations from Jews in America and Australia, and donors' names were inscribed on marble plaques over the doorways of the apartments.

On the north side of the courtyard stands the Beis Rachel Synagogue, donated by Kalonimus Davis of Melbourne in memory of his wife, Rachel. The synagogue is about 0.5 metres (1 ft 8 in) higher than the rest of the row houses. Due to the small number of residents, no school was built; children were sent to the school in the nearby neighborhood of Mazkeret Moshe.

First preference for apartments was given to new immigrants, then to residents of the Old City, and then to residents of the New City. Half of the apartments were sold to kolel members with a 13-year repayment plan. The other half were allocated to poor families who could live in them rent-free for three years. Tenants agreed "to pray and study the Torah regularly, and to pray for the souls of the donors after their deaths".

Although the community bylaws called for the planting of trees and plants in the central courtyard, this directive was largely ignored. Residents drew water from two cisterns located in the courtyard. By the end of the 19th century, years of drought led the Central Committee to purchase a water tanker from the Jaffa–Jerusalem railway company. Water was drawn from outlying wells, delivered by train to the railroad station, and then delivered by donkey to the neighborhood.

=== Knesset Bet ===
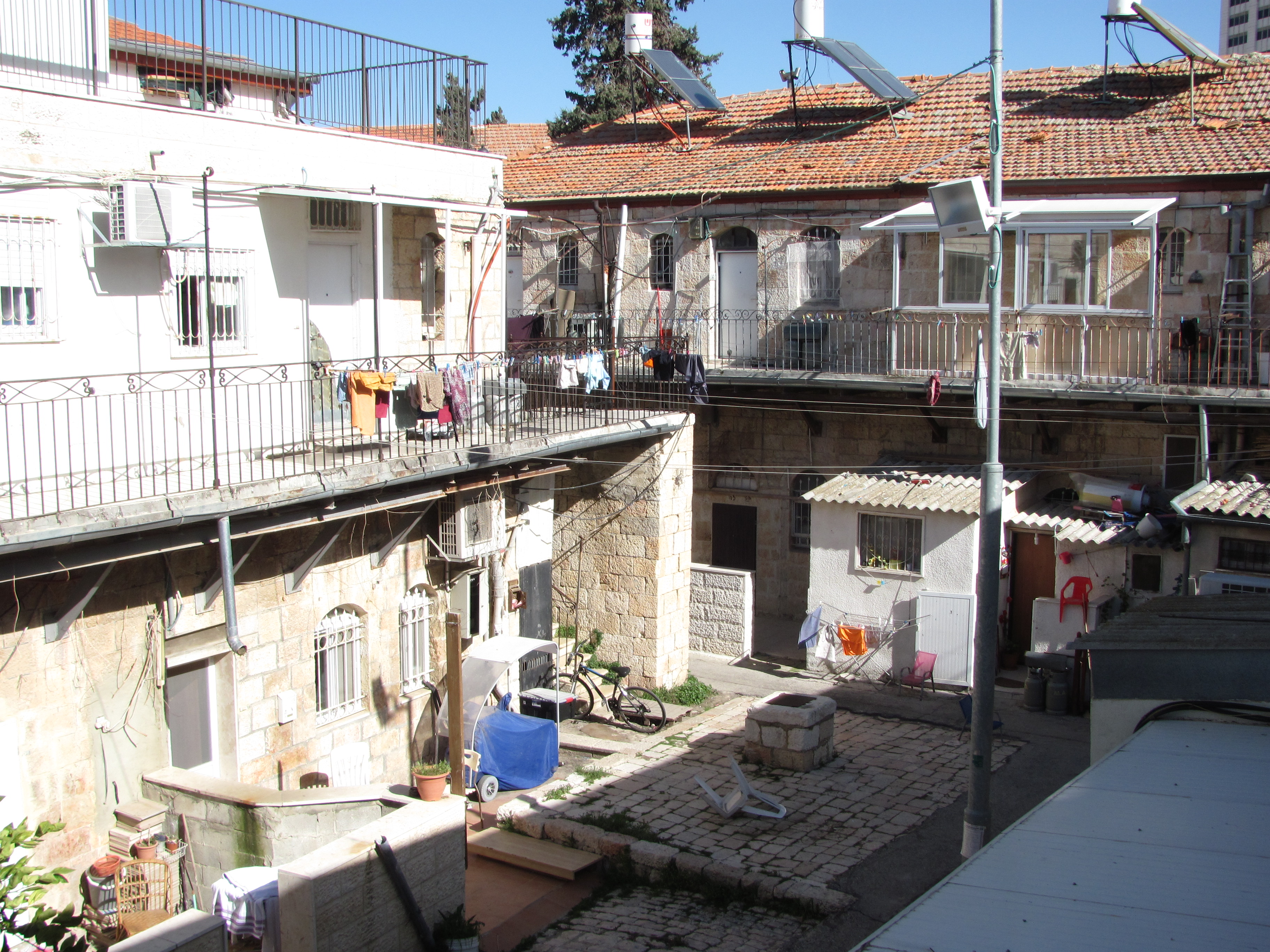
Row houses and courtyard (with sealed cistern) of Knesset Bet

In 1902, the Central Committee purchased another parcel of land near Knesset Aleph for the construction of Knesset Bet and the adjoining neighborhood of Batei Broide. For this second Knesset neighborhood, completed in 1908, two-story row houses were constructed on three sides of a rectangular courtyard. Like Knesset Aleph, the front entrances of the row houses faced each other. The courtyard, too, contained a water cistern.

By 1906, the two developments, Knesset Aleph and Knesset Bet, had a total of 101 houses, including two synagogues, four buildings housing matzo ovens, one building with a chametz oven (for baking bread products), and five water cisterns.

=== Knesset Gimmel ===
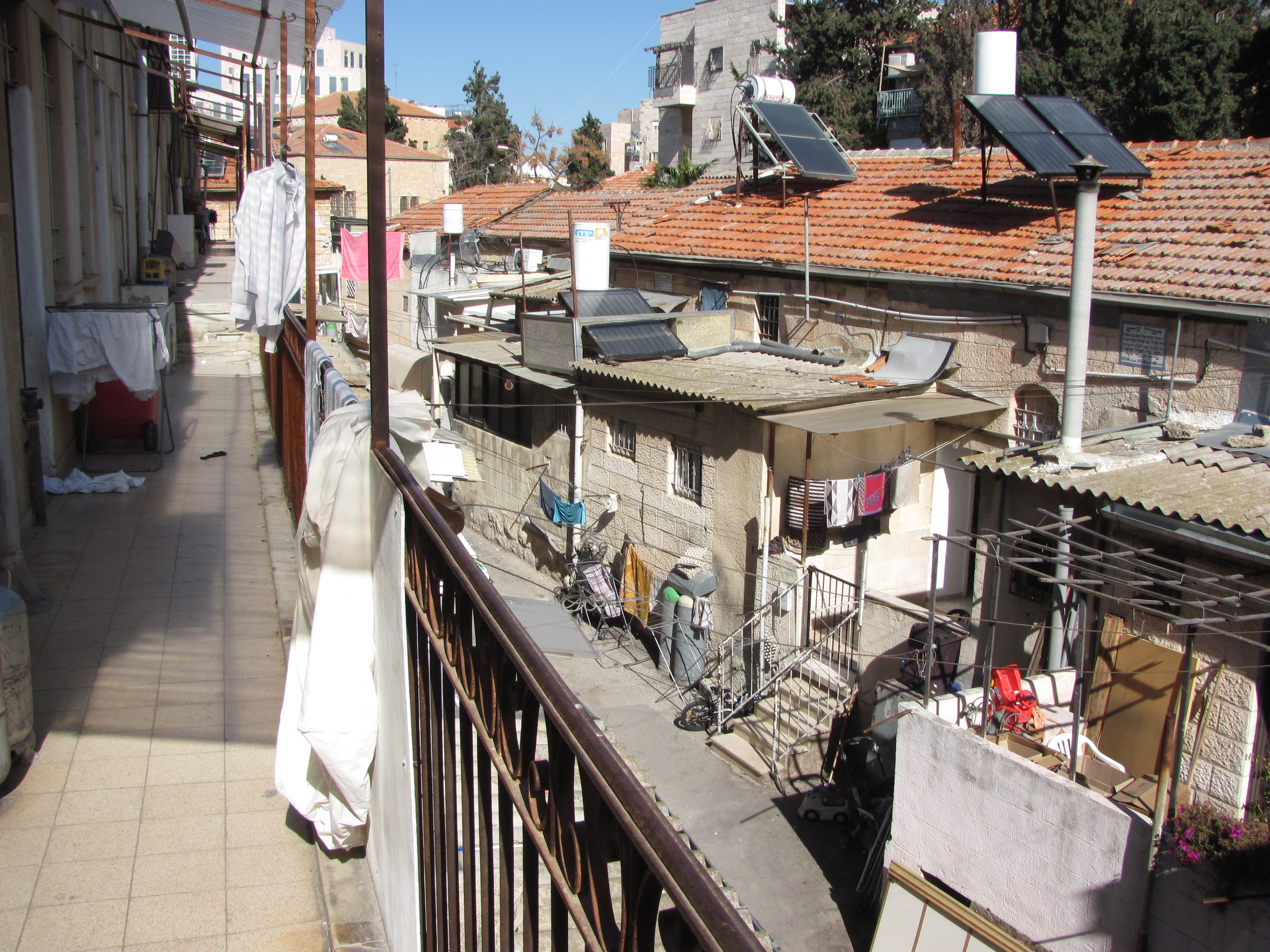
View of row houses and courtyard of Knesset Gimmel from a second-floor balcony

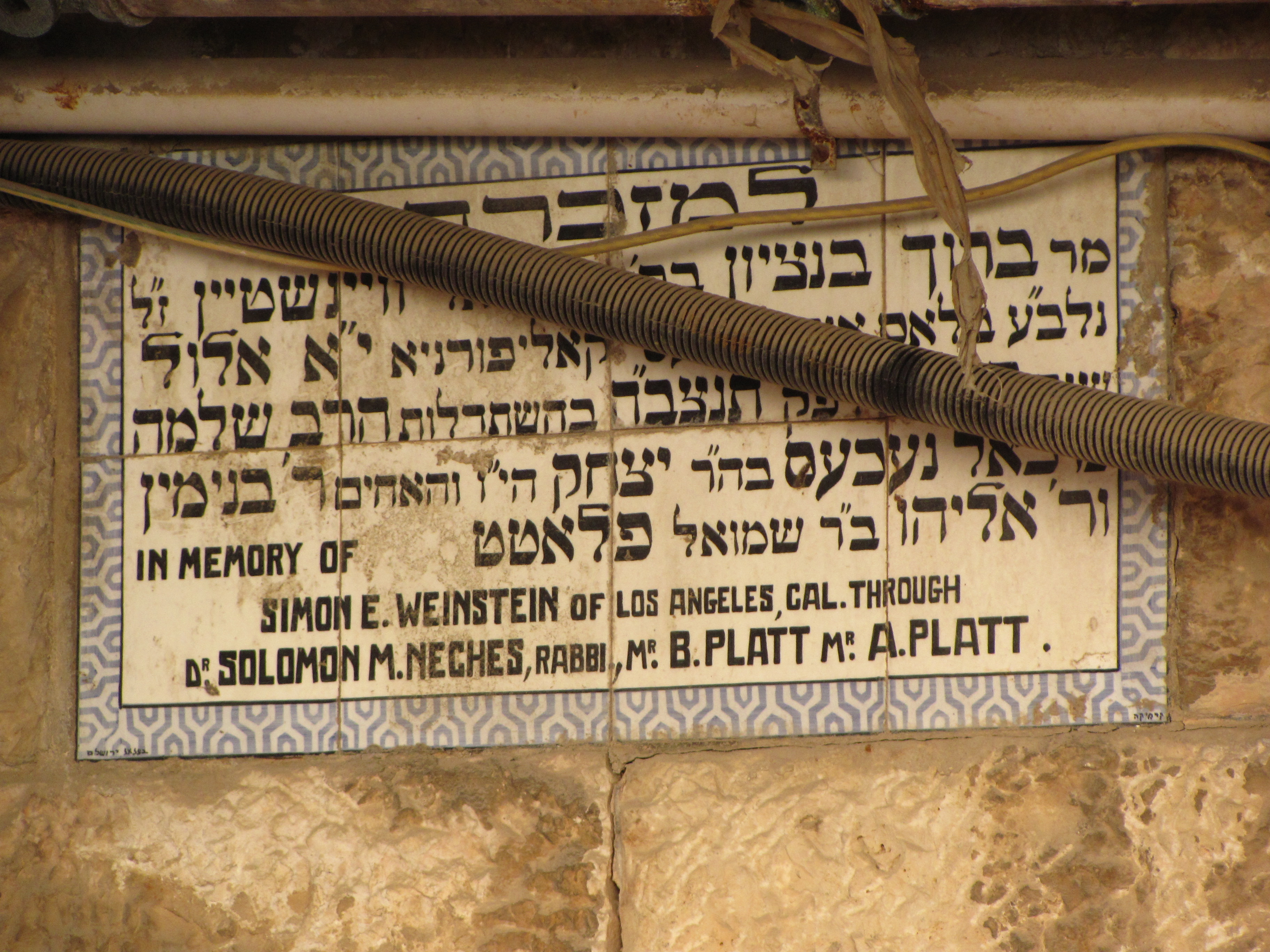
Memorial plaque in Knesset Gimmel for a donor from Los Angeles

In 1908, the Central Committee bought another plot of land southeast of Knesset Bet for the construction of Knesset Gimmel. The cornerstone was not laid until April 1925, in a ceremony conducted by Rabbi Abraham Isaac Kook. Construction was completed in 1926. This complex was also designed with two-story row houses on three sides of a rectangular courtyard. Marble dedication plaques commemorating donors from the United States, Australia, South Africa, Poland, and Jerusalem were affixed over the doorways of apartments in both Knesset Bet and Knesset Gimmel.

== Demographics ==
The three sections of Knesset Yisrael numbered 160 houses in 1935 and 176 houses by the 1950s. The population increased from 125 families in 1929 to over 200 families in 2010, which was considered "very cramped living conditions".

Since its founding, the population of Knesset Yisrael has been Haredi. Until the 1990s, the majority of the population was elderly, with an estimated 70% of residents classified as seniors in 1996. After that time, demographics shifted, with young couples and families moving in. A citywide survey in 2009 reported that Knesset Yisrael had a median age of 31.

== Notable residents ==
- Rabbi Yitzhak Arieli, spiritual leader
- Rabbi Shimon Tzvi Horowitz, kabbalist and co-rosh yeshiva of Shaar Hashamayim Yeshiva
- Rabbi Hillel Lieberman, founder of Bais Yaakov in Israel
- Moshe-Zvi Neria, founder of the Bnei Akiva movement and Israeli politician
- Dr. Ephraim Shach, son of Rabbi Elazar Shach

== See also ==
- Expansion of Jerusalem in the 19th century

== Sources ==
- Ben-Arieh, Yehoshua (1979). עיר בראי תקופה: ירושלים החדשה בראשיתה [A City Reflected in its Times: New Jerusalem – The Beginnings] (in Hebrew). Jerusalem: Yad Izhak Ben-Zvi Publications.
- Frieman, Shulamis (2000). Who’s Who in the Talmud. Jason Aronson. ISBN 1461632544.
- Kark, Ruth; Oren-Nordheim, Michal (2001). Jerusalem and Its Environs: Quarters, Neighborhoods, Villages, 1800-1948. Wayne State University Press. p. 84. ISBN 0814329098.
- Kroyanker, David; Wahrman, Dror (1983). Jerusalem Architecture, Periods and Styles: The Jewish Quarters and Public Buildings Outside the Old City Walls, 1860-1914. Jerusalem Institute for Israel Studies. ISBN 9652610194.
- Pincus, Rabbi Shimshon Dovid (2009). Nefesh Shimshon: Shabbos Kodesh. Feldheim. ISBN 1598262831.
- Porush, Eliyahu (1 January 1963). "Early Memories: Recollections Concerning the Settlement of Jerusalem The Old City and Its Environs During the Last Century". University of Pennsylvania Scholarly Commons. Archived from the original on July 25, 2010.
- Rossoff, Dovid (1998). Where Heaven Touches Earth. Guardian Press. ISBN 0-87306-879-3.
- Shwartz, Eliyahu Yekutiel (2005). "My Life's Story" (PDF). Eliyahu Yekutiel Shwartz Memorial Committee.
- Wager, Eliyahu (1988). Illustrated Guide to Jerusalem. The Jerusalem Publishing House.
