= Aharon ben Yosef ha-Kohen =

Rabbi, son-in-law of Chofetz Chaim (1863 – 1936)

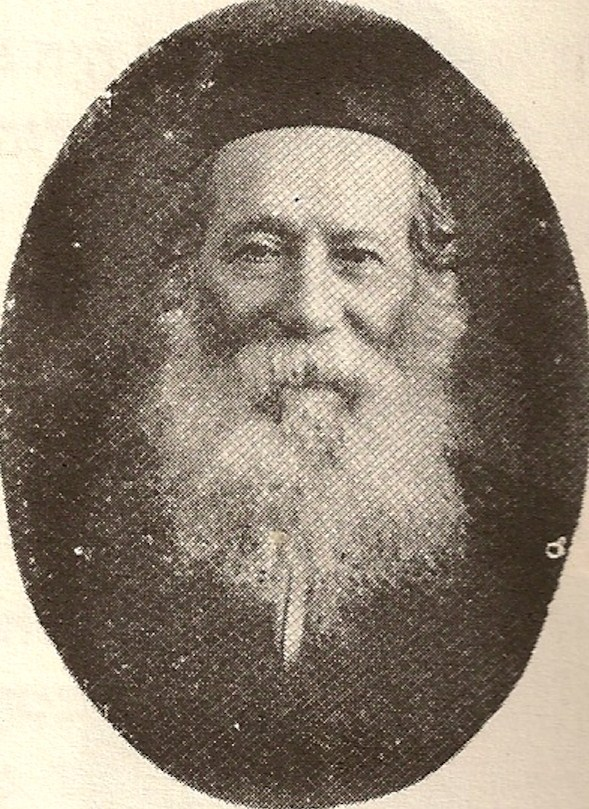
- Born: 1863; Grodno
- Died: February 18, 1936 (aged 72–73); Tel Aviv
- Notable work: Chesed L'Avraham, Avodat Hakorbanot, Zichron Yosef, Pirchei Aharon
- Spouse: Gittel
- Children: Avraham Ha-Cohen, Shlomo HaCohen Kagan Yosef Chaim (Joseph) Kagan, Rachel Mereminsky
- Relatives: Father in law: Yisrael Meir Kagan (Chofetz Chaim)

Rabbi Aaron Ben Yosef HaCohen (Hebrew: אהרן בן יוסף הכהן 1863, Grodno – February 25, 1936 Tel Aviv) was the son-in-law of the Yisrael Meir Kagan, and author of the book "Avodat HaKorbanot".

== Biography ==
He was born in Grodno in 1863 to Yosef HaCohen, and his wife, Haniya bat Tzvi.

He studied in the yeshivas of Eišiškės and Białystok. While in Bialystok, he assisted the Yisrael Meir Kagan, known as the Chofetz Chaim, during his visit to the city. Kagan subsequencly chose him as a son-in-law for his daughter Gittel. Kagan agreed to support the young couple after they were married unless he moved to Israel, in which case he would no longer be obligated to support them financially. The two were married in Elul 5642 and Rabbi Aaron moved to live near his father-in-law in Radun, Belarus, where he taught in the yeshiva and assisted his father-in-law in writing and disseminating his books.

His brother-in-law describes this period:

"He sat in his father-in-law's house for many years, and received Torah, fear of Heaven and good middot from his father-in-law of blessed memory, and studied with him for many hours. And he helped him arrange his works, and he grew up, and was a prominent and accomplished rabbi."

- Rabbi Aryeh Leib Popka

Around 1902 Aharon moved with his wife to serve as rabbi in the town of Mikališkiai, Kėdainiai, where in 1913 he published his book "Avodat HaKorbanot". Afterwards he served as rabbi in the town of Švenčionys, where in 1924 he published the second part of his book "Avodat HaKorbanot". About this period he wrote:

"And God graced me in my youth to merit serving His holy nation for many years during the time I was close to the holy Chofetz Chaim... and for many years I would travel between various cities for a set period each year and with God's help my words made a strong impression everywhere I went and achieved greatly in elevating the banner of Torah and mitzvot as our sages said "Words that come from the heart enter the heart" and all my travels were without receiving any payment"

- From the introduction to his book Chesed L'Avraham

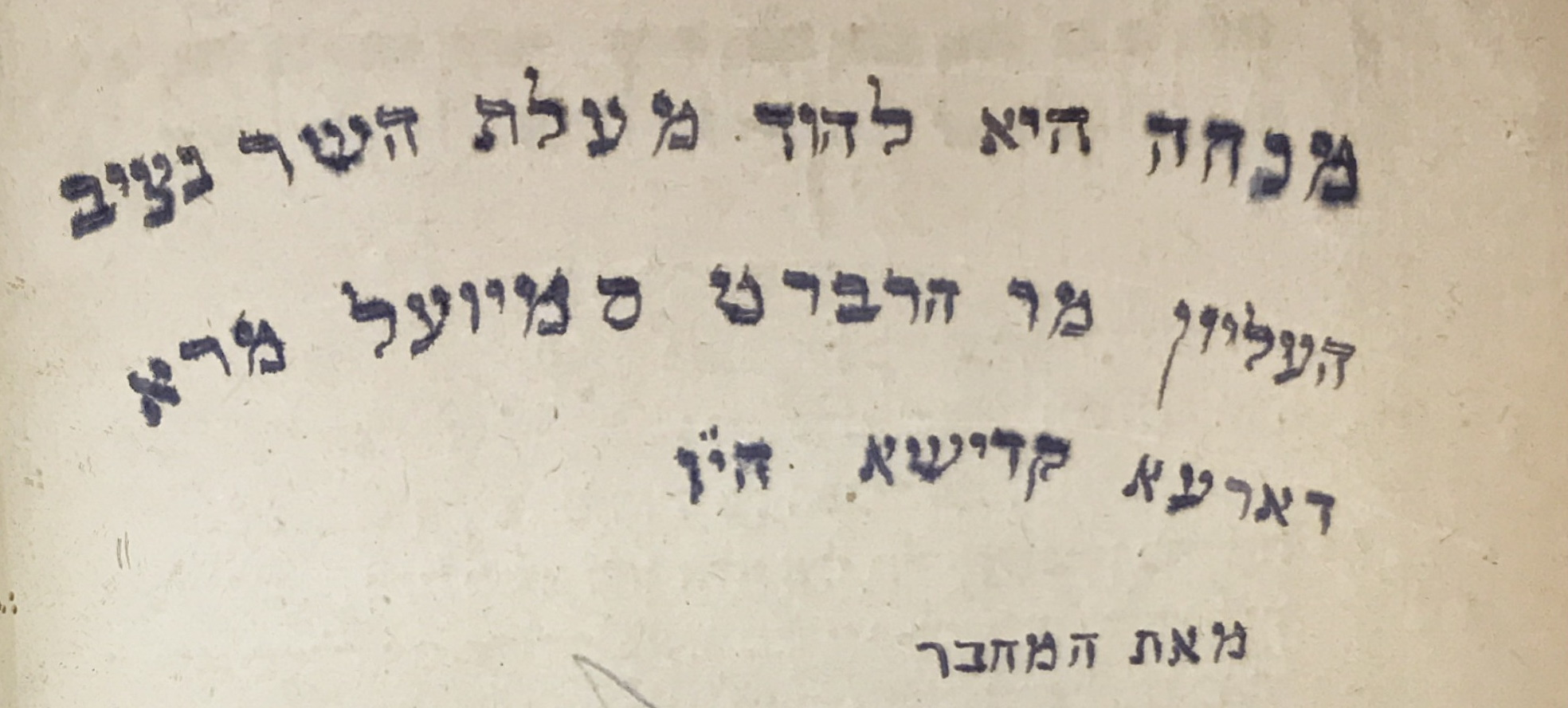
Dedication to Herbert Samuel by Aaron Ben Yoseph Hacohen

In 1926 he immigrated to Israel. At first he lived in the Sha'arei Hesed neighborhood of Jerusalem, however due to the dispute between the zealots and Rabbi Abraham Isaac Kook he left Jerusalem and moved to Jaffa, where he replaced Rabbi Yosef Zvi HaLevy in running the founded by Zerah Barnett. In 1928, due to ill health, he retired from running the yeshiva. On the 25th of Shevat 5676 (18 February 1936) he died and was buried in the Mount of Olives Jewish Cemetery. His wife Gittel died on 23rd of Tammuz 5709 (July 20, 1949).

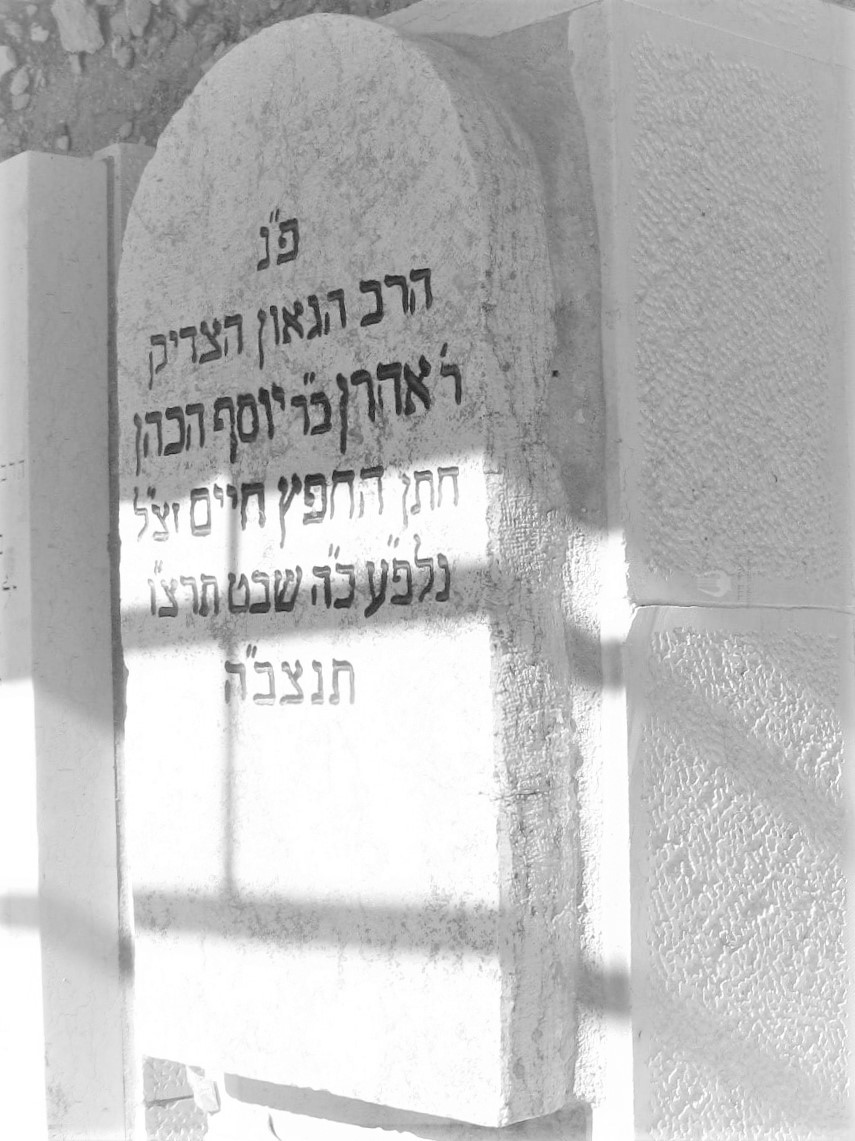
The grave of Rabbi Aharon ben Yosef HaCohen, son-in-law of the Chofetz Chaim, on Mount of Olives

== Family ==
- His son, Rabbi Avraham HaCohen (born after 1892 - died on the 17th of Tishrei 5714—September 26, 1953), married Menucha Salonivitch. He immigrated to Israel and served as the rabbi of the Ohel Rivka synagogue in Tel Aviv.
- His son, Rabbi Shlomo HaCohen Kagan (born in 1905 - died on the 21st of Tishrei 5722—October 1, 1961), studied at the Mercaz HaRavYeshiva during the tenure of Rabbi Kook, married Yocheved, daughter of Rabbi BenZion Epstein. He served as the rabbi of the Bnai Moshe synagogue in Chicago.
- His son, Rabbi Yosef Chaim (Joseph) Kagan (d. Sivan 28 5731 - June 21, 1971) married Rivka, the daughter of Rabbi Shmuel Shach of Chicago. He served as rabbi of "Kehillath Jacob" synagogue in Chicago. He was the author of "lyunei Halacha Vehegyonot" and "Hegyonoth"
- His daughter, Rachel (d. 4 Tammuz 5704) married Rabbi Yehoshua Moshe (Joshua) Mereminsky (March 10, 1881—August 14, 1961), author of "Ani Choma" and "Responsa Beit Yisrael"

== Books ==
- Avodat Hakorbanot --- A "Shulchan Aruch" on the laws of sacrifices (Peterkov, 1913)English translation
- Zichron Yosef (Vilna 1924)
- Chesed L'Avraham (Jerusalem, before 1930)
- Pirchei Aharon—on Genesis and the rest of the Torah (Tel Aviv, 1930)
