= Zikhron Yosef =

Neighborhood of Jerusalem, Israel

Coordinates: 31.783683°N 35.209983°E

Zikhron Yosef (Hebrew: זכרון יוסף lit. Memorial for Joseph) is a former courtyard neighborhood in Jerusalem. The neighborhood was established in 1927 near the Mahane Yehuda Market by Kurdish Jewish immigrants who used to live in the Old City of Jerusalem. The neighborhood is named after its former landowner Joseph Levy, whose son sold the land on condition that the neighborhood would be named after his father.

Because the neighbourhood was built during the British Mandate in Palestine, it was built according to the planning and building laws of the British authorities – this is noticeable due to the relatively low houses in the neighbourhood which reach a maximum height of only three floors.

The neighborhood is bordered by the streets Agrippas-HaYarmouk, HaArnon and HaYarkon. Today it is part of the Nachlaot neighborhood.
