= Nachlaot =

Neighborhood in Jerusalem

Coordinates: 31°46′57.8″N 35°12′42.03″E

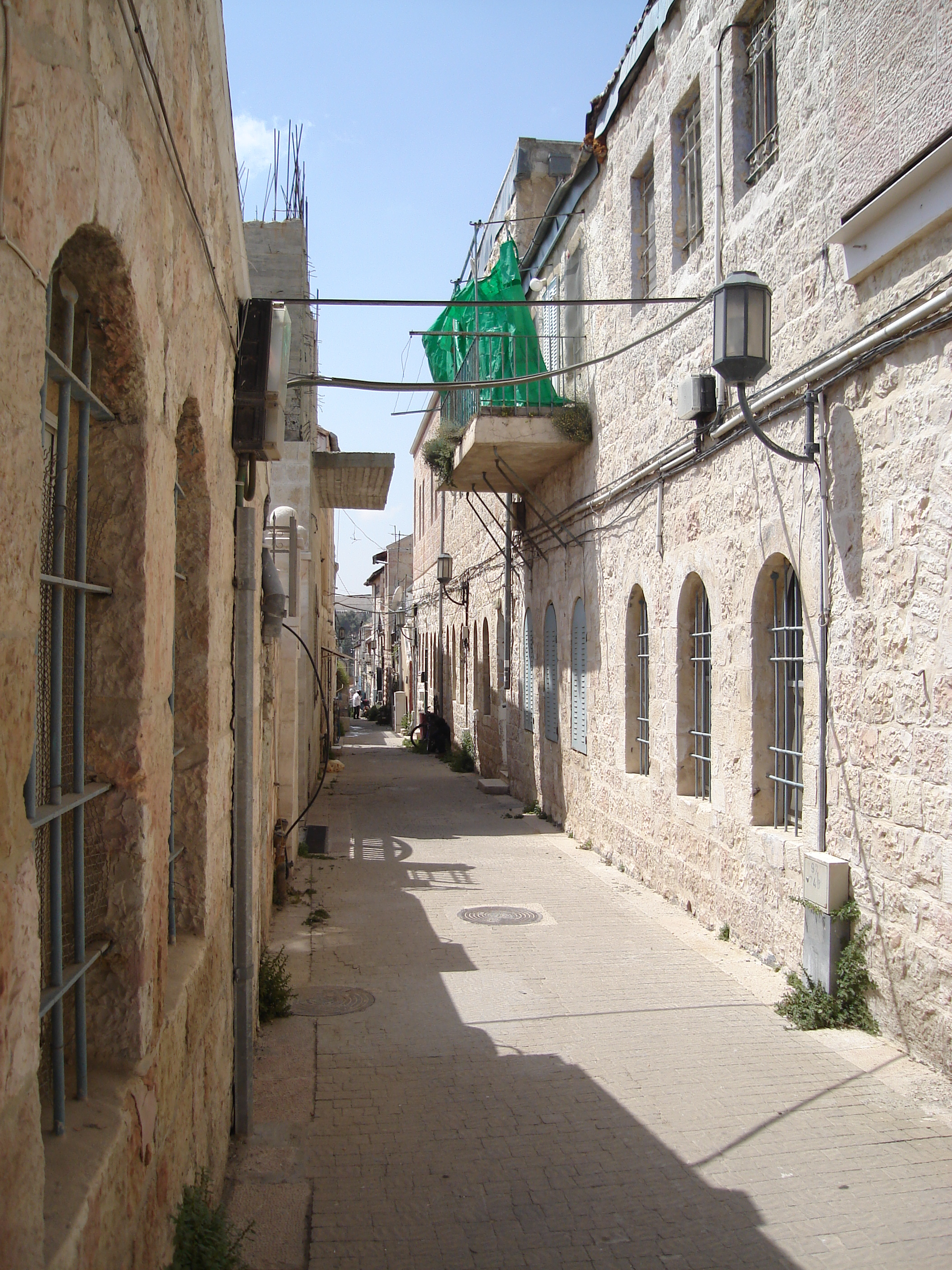
Street in Nachlaot

Nachlaot (Hebrew: נחלאות, also Naḥlaʾoth) is a cluster of 32 neighbourhoods, many of them courtyard neighborhoods in central Jerusalem surrounding the Mahane Yehuda Market. It is known for its narrow, winding lanes, old-style housing, hidden courtyards and many small synagogues.

Neighborhoods in Nachlaot (plural of nachala, lit. "homestead") include Batei Broide (founded 1902), Batei Goral (founded 1885), Batei Minsk (1895), Batei Munkacs (1931), Batei Rand (1908), Batei Ya'akovson (1902), Bet Ya'acov (1877), Even Yisrael (1875, the oldest of the group), Knesset Yisrael (three neighbourhoods: Knesset A, B and C and founded in 1891, 1903 and 1925 respectively), Mahane Yehuda (1888), Mazkeret Moshe (1882), Mishkenot Yisrael (1876), Nachalat Achim (1892), Nahalat Yaakov (1927), Nahalat Zion (1891), Neve Bezalel (1924), Neve Shalom (1896), Ohel Moshe (1883), Ohel Shlomo (1891), Shaare Rahamim (1906), Shaare Zedek (1889), Sha'arei Yerushalayim (1891), Shevet Achim (1892), Shevet Zedek (1889), Sukkat Shalom (1888), Zikhron Ahim (1929), Zikhron Tuvya (1890), Zikhron Ya'acov (1933), and Zikhron Yosef (1931).

== Name ==
Nahala, plural nahlaot (with different ways of transliterating/spelling it), is a Hebrew word for either heritage or estate.

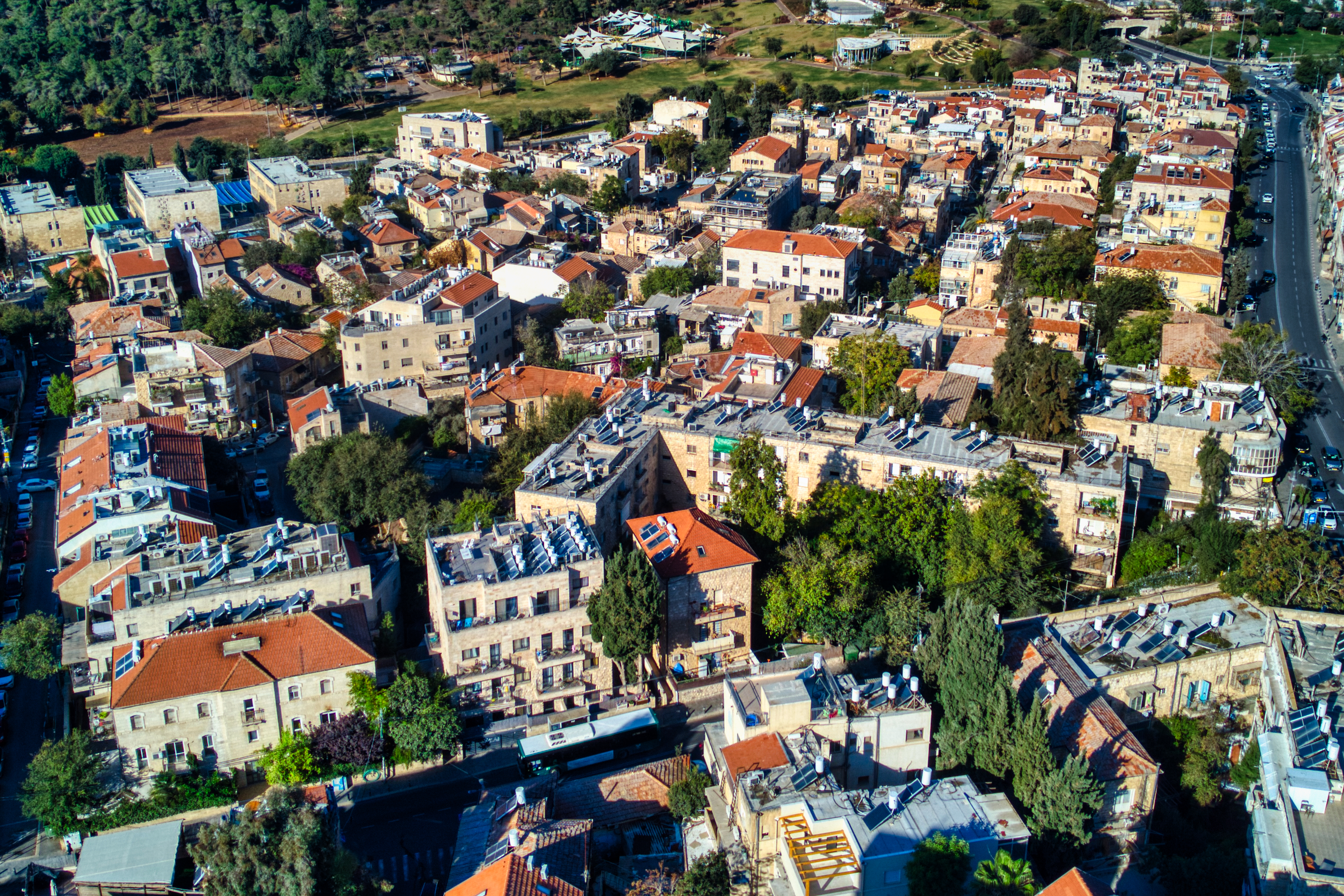
Nachlaot neighborhoods south of Bezalel Street

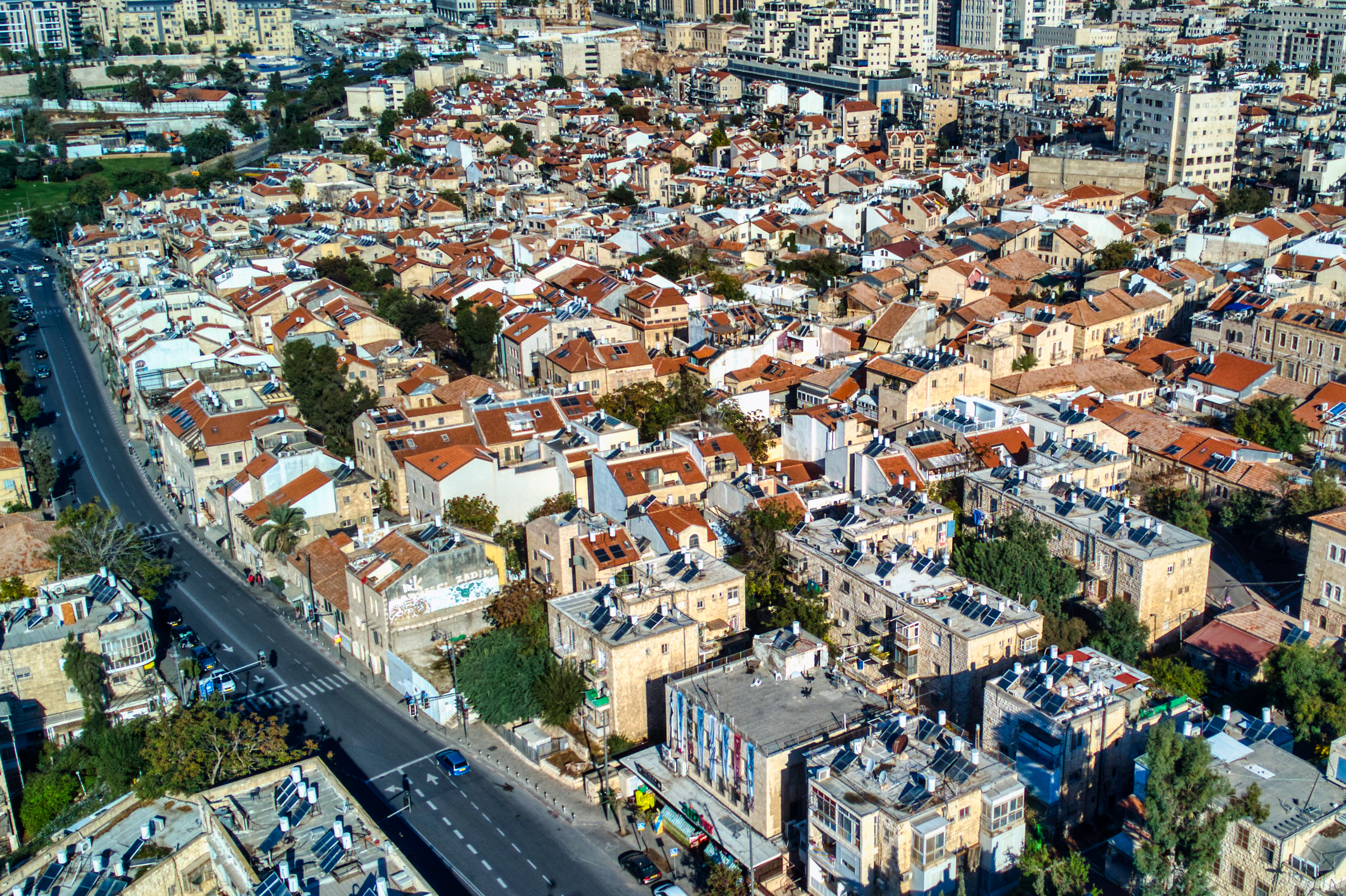
Nachlaot neighborhoods north of Bezalel Street

== History ==
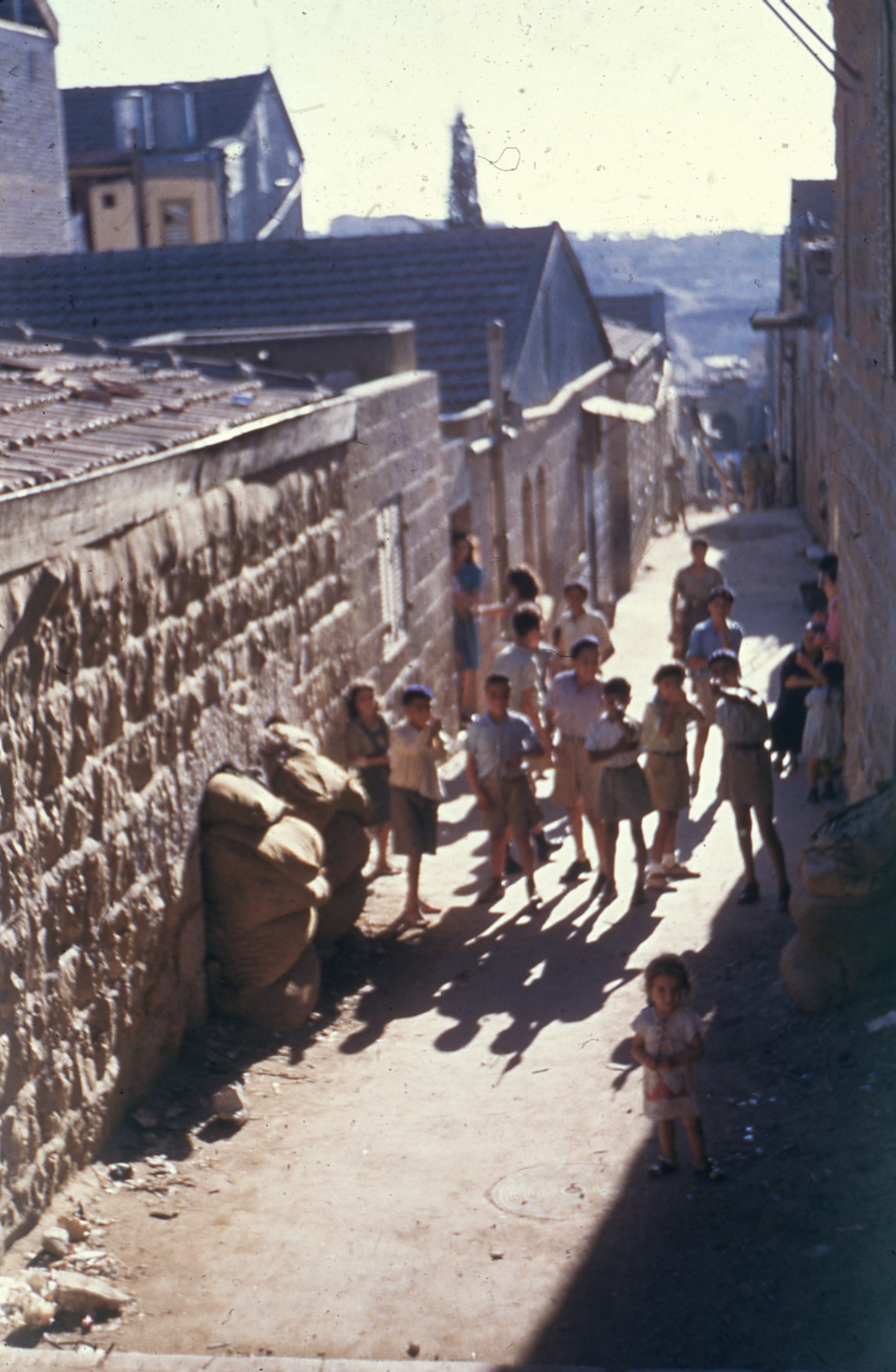
Children playing in the streets of Nachlaot during the 1948 siege of Jerusalem

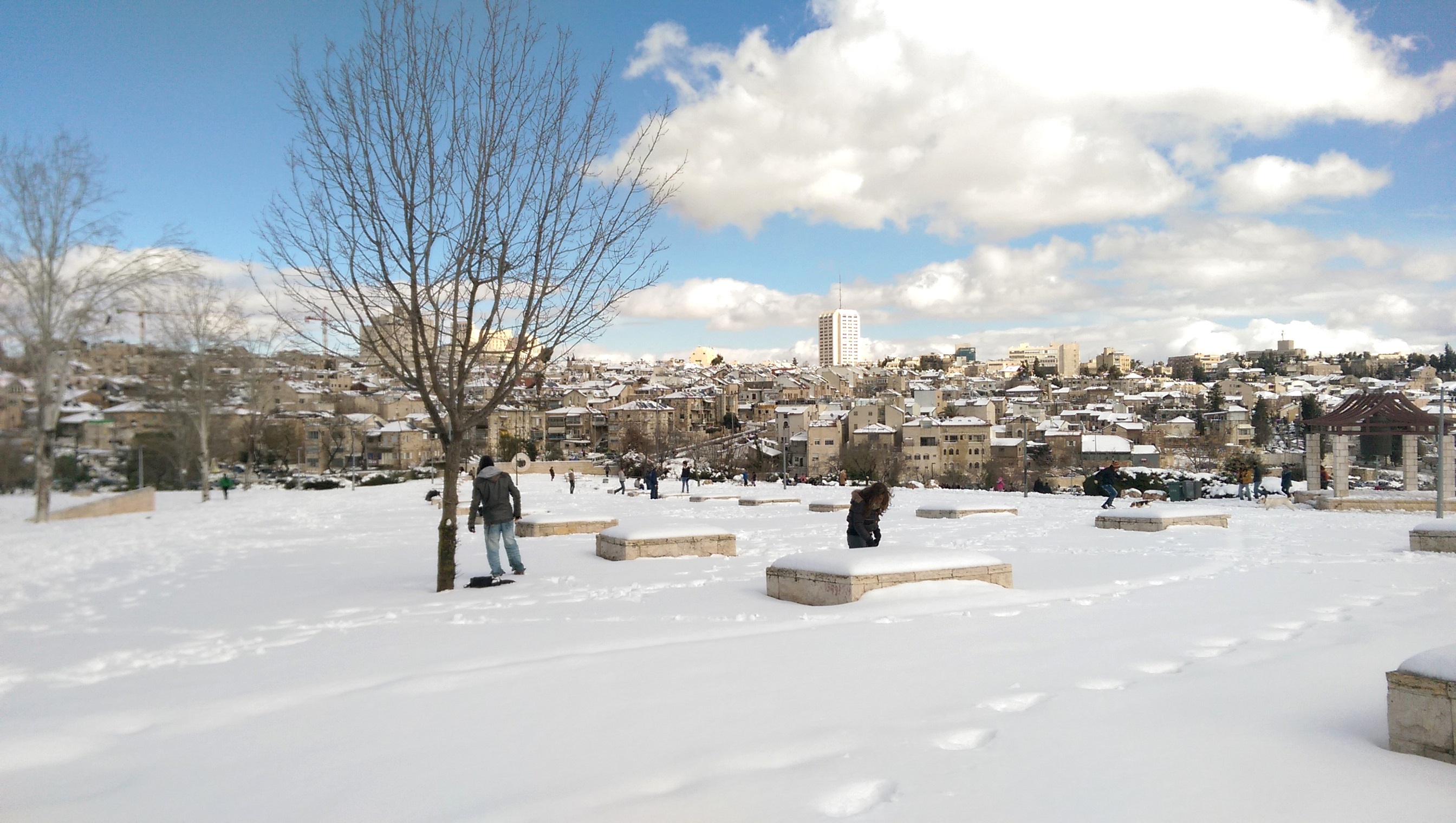
View of Nachlaot from Sacher Park, February 2015

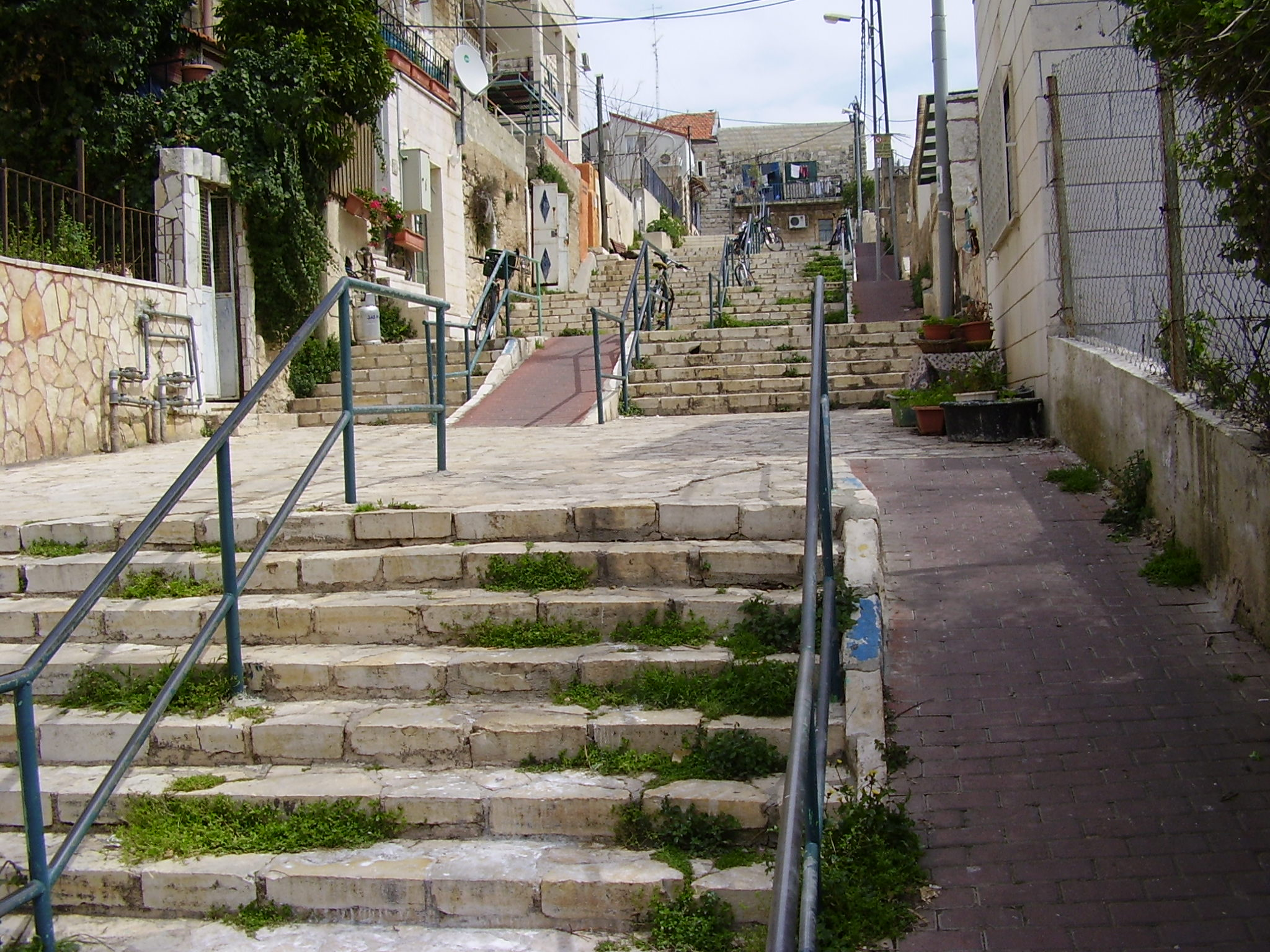
Street of the Stairs, Nahalat Ahim

The neighbourhoods that make up the Nachlaot district were established between 1875 and 1933 outside the walls of the Old City, which was becoming increasingly overcrowded and unsanitary. The first was Even Yisrael, built in 1875 as the sixth neighborhood outside of the walls of Jerusalem's Old City. Its name was derived from the biblical verse (Genesis 49:24): "But his bow abode firm, and the arms of his hands were made supple, by the hands of the Mighty One of Jacob, from thence, from the Shepherd, the Stone of Israel." The numerical value of stone ("Even" in Hebrew) also corresponds to the 53 homes first built there. Established that same year to the west of Even Yisrael, Mishkenot Yisrael is the second neighborhood of the Nachlaot. The name comes from a biblical verse (Numbers 24:5): "How goodly are thy tents, O Jacob/Thy dwellings, O Israel." Mazkeret Moshe was founded by Sir Moses Montefiore in 1882 as an Ashkenazi neighborhood. Ohel Moshe is a Sephardi neighborhood established alongside it.

Former Israeli president Yitzhak Navon grew up in Ohel Moshe, and the neighborhood served as the inspiration for his play Bustan Sephardi (Sephardi Orchard). The Banai family, a famous family of actors and singers, lived in Nachlaot. A Syrian Jewish community settled in Nahalat Zion in 1891 and built the Ades Synagogue, which was completed in 1901. Jerusalem's Mahane Yehuda outdoor market is located in Nachlaot. Rabbi Aryeh Levin, known as the "prisoners' rabbi" for his visits to members of the Jewish underground imprisoned in the Russian Compound, lived in Mishkenot Yisrael. Nahalat Ahim, south of Rehov Bezalel, was founded in 1925 for the Yemenite community.

In the wake of gentrification in the area, housing prices have risen steeply.

== Religious institutions ==
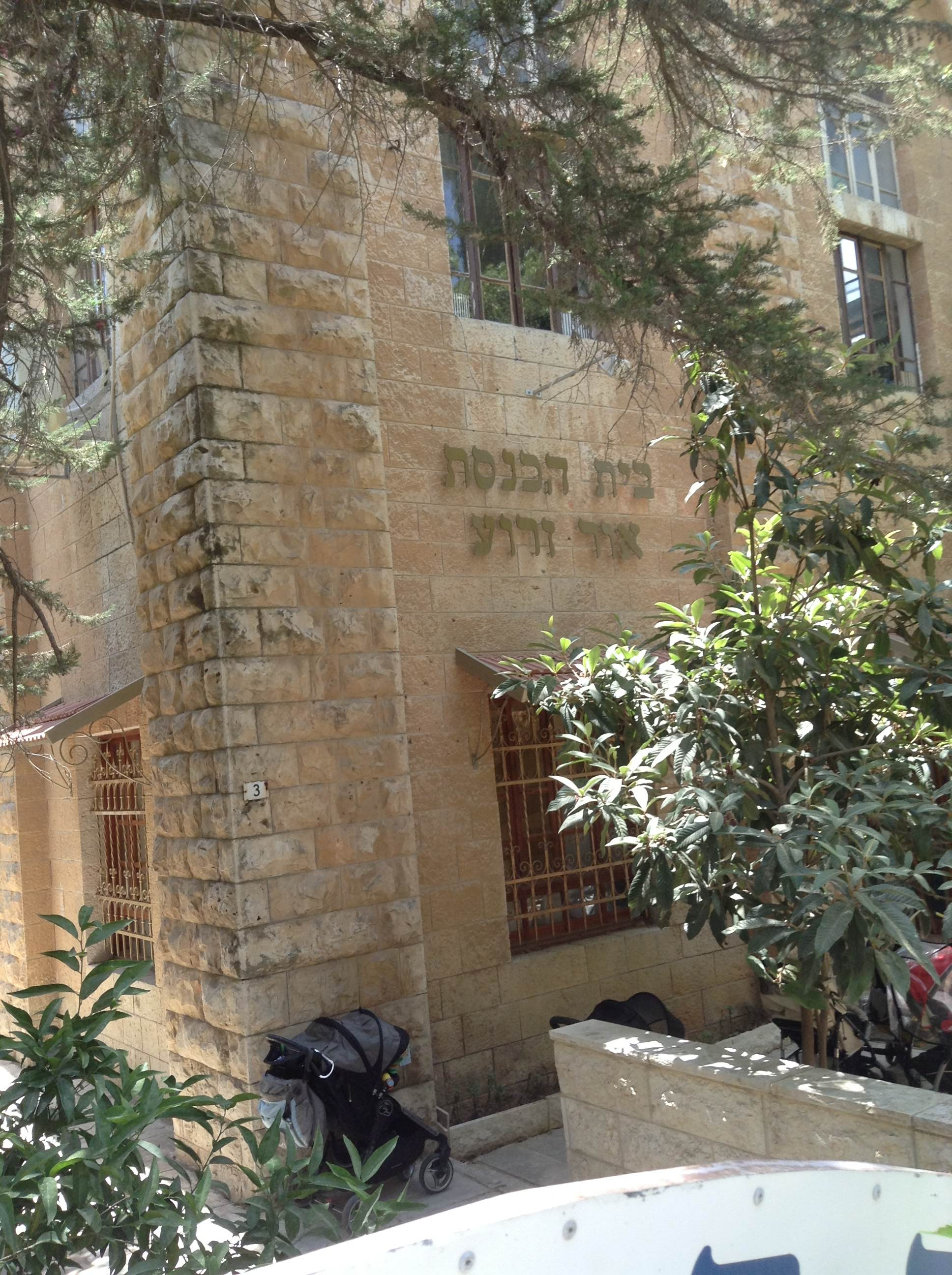
Or Zaruaa Synagogue

At one time Nachlaot had a higher concentration of synagogues than anywhere else in the world, around 300 within a radius of just a few blocks. Many of these were not much more than a tiny room with space for only about a dozen worshippers.

The neighborhood includes the Ades Synagogue, Ades Congregation, the flagship of the Syrian Halebi community, as well as the synagogues located in the Knesset Aleph (Beis Rachel), Batei Broide, Batei Munkatz and Batei Rand neighborhoods, following the tradition of Old Jerusalem, including followers of the Vilna Gaon as well as Hasidic tradition.

Or Zaruaa Synagogue, founded in 1926 by Rabbi Amram Aburbeh for the Ma'araviim Jewish congregation, also served as a yeshiva for religious students. The building located on 3 Shmuel Refaeli street in Nahalat Ahim neighborhood was declared a historic preservation site in 1989, under cultural heritage protection. Rabbi Ben-Zion Meir Hai Uziel, the chief rabbi of Erez Israel, appointed Aburbeh as chief rabbi of the Nachlaot neighbourhood from 1924 to 1951. He was succeeded by Rabbi Rahamim Levy, who served as Rav of Nachlaot until 2013.

The Romaniote community of Jerusalem holds its religious services in the synagogue Beit Avraham Ve'ohel Sarah liKehilat Ioanina, which is also in Nachlaot.

Yeshiva Sulam Yaakov was founded in 2006 by Rabbi Aaron Leibowitz; it largely served the "Anglo" community. The Yeshiva ceased activities in 2018.

== Cultural landmarks ==
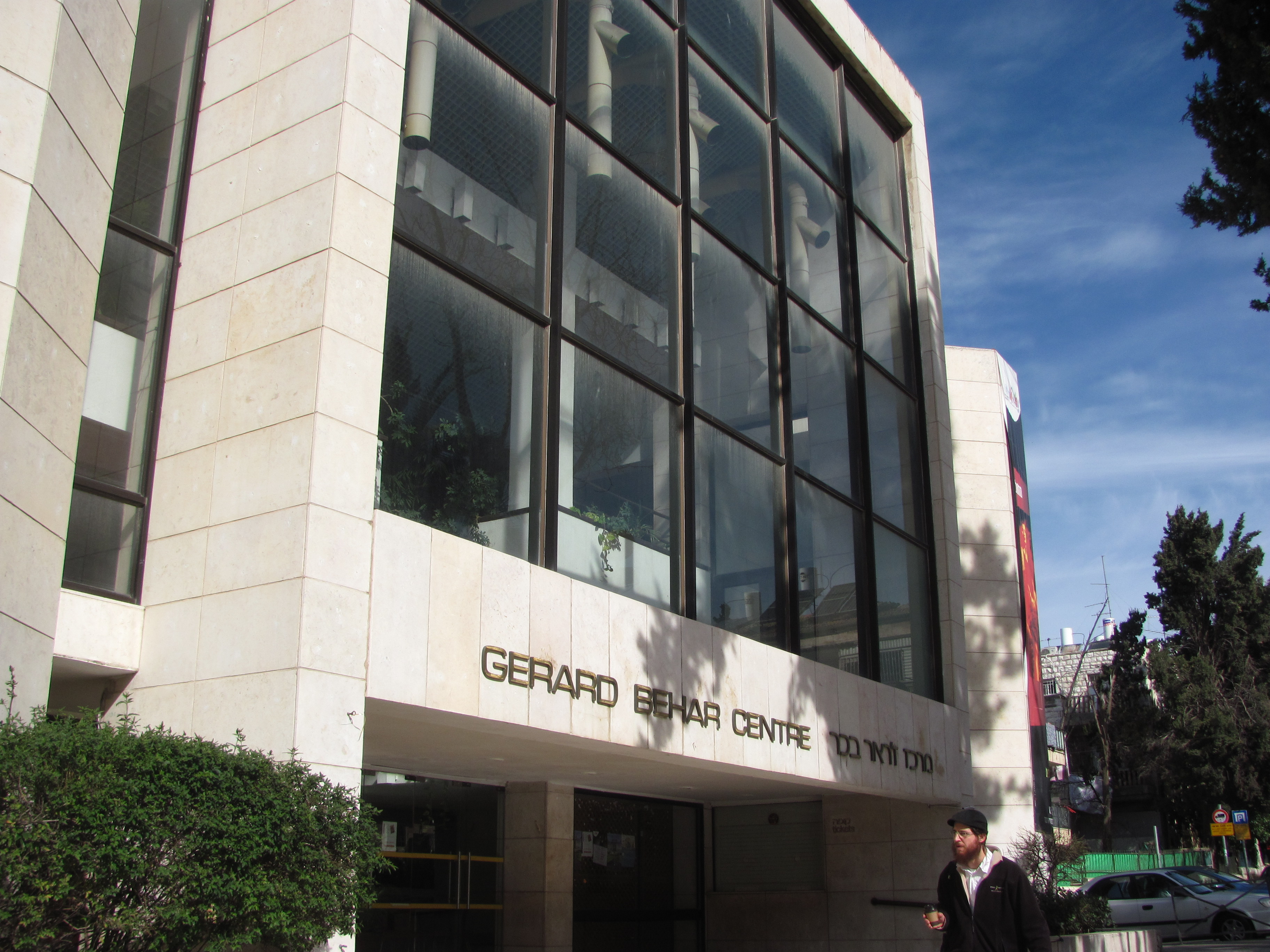
Gerard Behar Center

The Gerard Behar Center, formerly known as Beit Ha'Am, opened in 1961. It was the venue for the 1961 trial of Adolf Eichmann and was renovated in 1983 as an arts centre.

Barbur Gallery is a nonprofit space originally opened in Nachlaot for contemporary art and artists, offering changing exhibitions, musical performances, movie screenings, video-art and art lectures. In 2020, the gallery relocated to the nearby Mamilla neighborhood.

== Notable residents ==
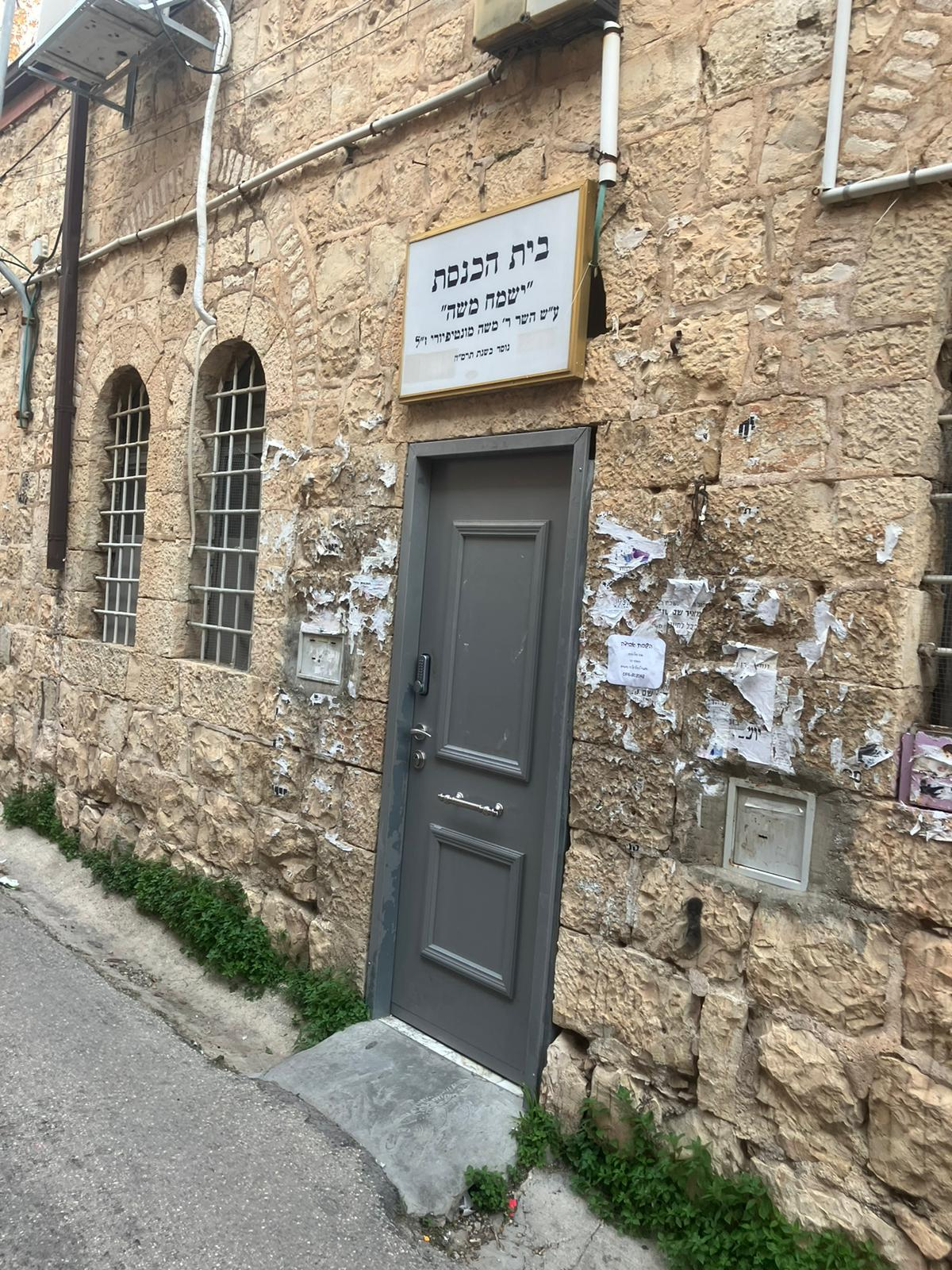
The Ashkenazic synagogue of Mazkeret Moshe. While it is officially called "Yismach Moshe" as it says on the sign, it is generally referred to by local Hareidi residents as Mazkeres, the Ashkenazic pronunciation of the neighborhood and the street where it is located.

- Rabbi Yitzhak Arieli, spiritual leader
- Amram Aburbeh - Nachlaot's Chief Rabbi between 1925–1951
- Ehud Banai (born 1953) - singer and songwriter
- Yossi Banai (1932–2006) - singer, actor, and dramatist
- Uzi Baram (born 1937) - former member of the Knesset and government minister
- Alex Clare - English singer and songwriter, moved to Jerusalem in 2015, returned to UK in 2025.
- Rabbi Shimon Tzvi Horowitz, kabbalist and co-rosh yeshiva of Shaar Hashamayim Yeshiva
- Aryeh Levin (1885-1969) - Orthodox rabbi dubbed the "Father of Prisoners"
- Michael Levin (1984–2006) - American-Israeli paratrooper
- Rami Levy (born 1955) - founder and owner of Israeli's third-largest retail supermarket chain
- Rabbi Hillel Lieberman, founder of Bais Yaakov in Israel
- Uzi Narkiss (1925–1997) - Israeli general
- Yitzhak Navon (1921–2015) - President of Israel; politician, diplomat, and author
- Moshe-Zvi Neria, founder of the Bnei Akiva movement and Israeli politician
- Shlomo Zalman Porush, charity trustee in the Old Yishuv.
- Yosef Qafih (1917–2000) - Yemenite-Israeli authority on Jewish religious law
- Aaron Razel (born 1974) - singer, musician
- Yonatan Razel (born 1973) - American-Israeli singer, musician
- Yosef Rivlin (1838–1897) - rabbi and founder of several Jerusalem neighbourhoods.
- Dr. Ephraim Shach, son of Rabbi Elazar Shach

== See also ==
- Expansion of Jerusalem in the 19th century
