= Beit David =

Fourth Jewish neighborhood outside the walls of Jerusalem

Beit David בית דוד
- Neighborhood
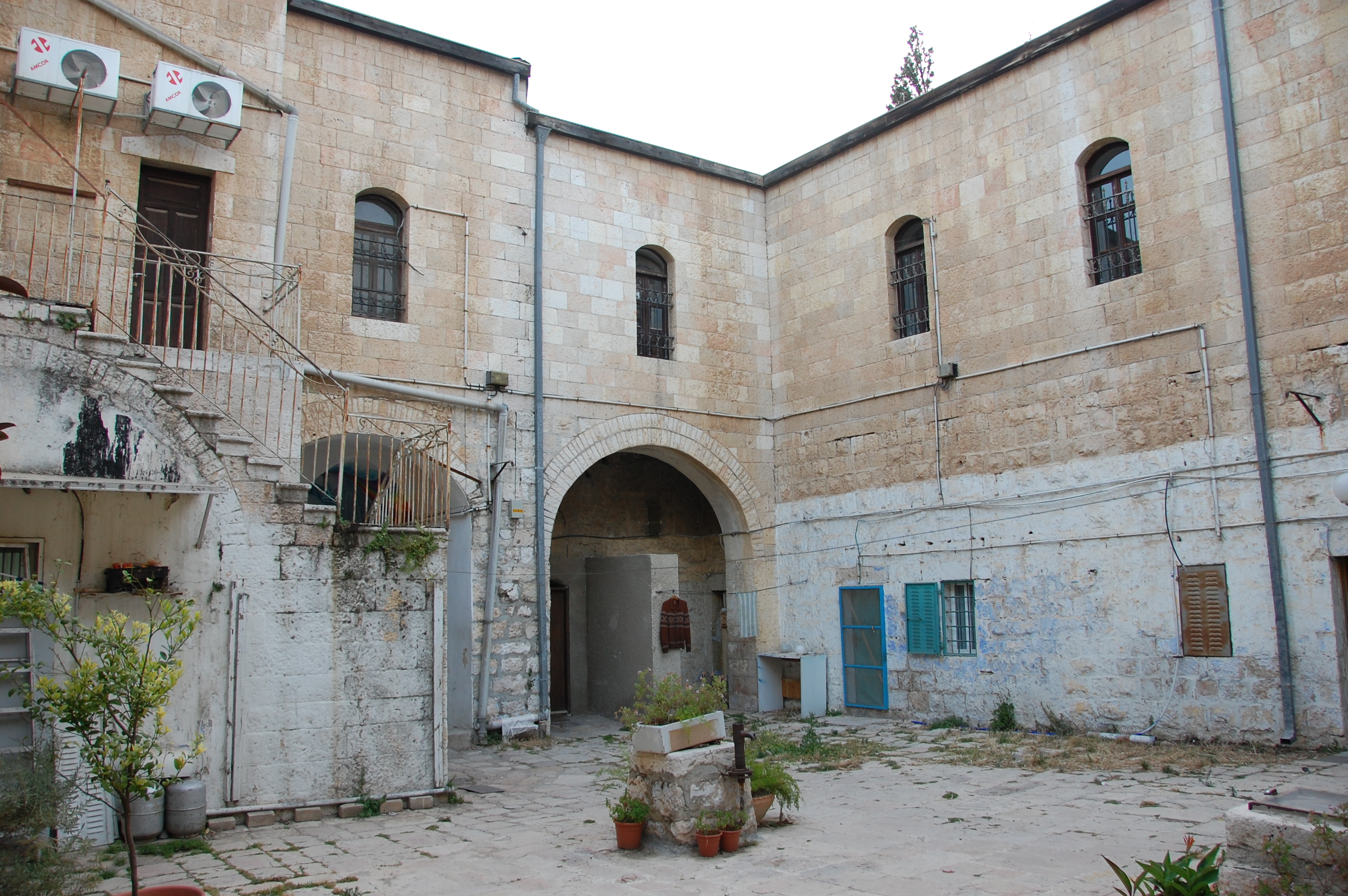
- Interactive map of Beit David
- Country: Israel
- City: West Jerusalem
- Established: 1873

Beit David was the fourth Jewish neighborhood outside the walls of Jerusalem. This courtyard neighborhood was established in 1873.

== History ==
Beit David was founded as an almshouse for Jews on a plot of land donated by a kollel. It was named for the philanthropist, David Reis. The name also alludes to the historical House of David and to the book known as Beit David, a treatise on Jewish law written by Joseph Ben David in the 18th century. Because Beit David was far from the kollel's center in the Old City, it contained a synagogue and 10 apartments to ensure the existence of a minyan.

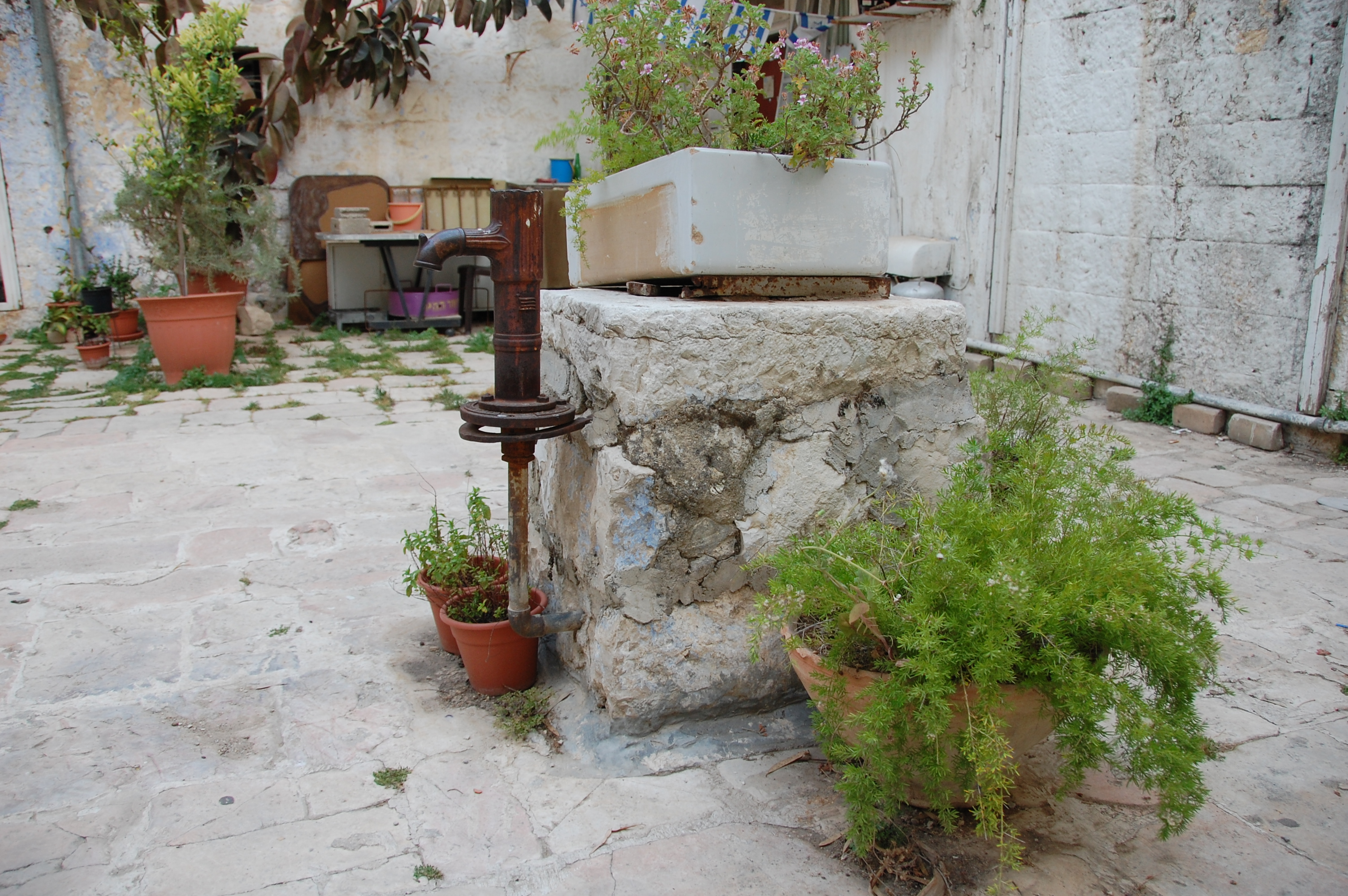
The water cistern of the neighborhood

The residence of Abraham Isaac Kook, Israel's first Askenanzic chief rabbi was on the second floor of the building, added in 1922. The Rabbi Kook House is now a museum of the life of Rabbi Kook. The Museum of Psalms, located on the ground floor for many years, featured the paintings of Moshe Tzvi HaLevi Berger, a Kabbalist and painter. Berger was evicted in 2014 to make room for a yeshiva

== See also ==
- Expansion of Jerusalem in the 19th century
