= Mazkeret Moshe =

Former neighborhood in Jerusalem

Coordinates: 31.783097°N 35.213781°E

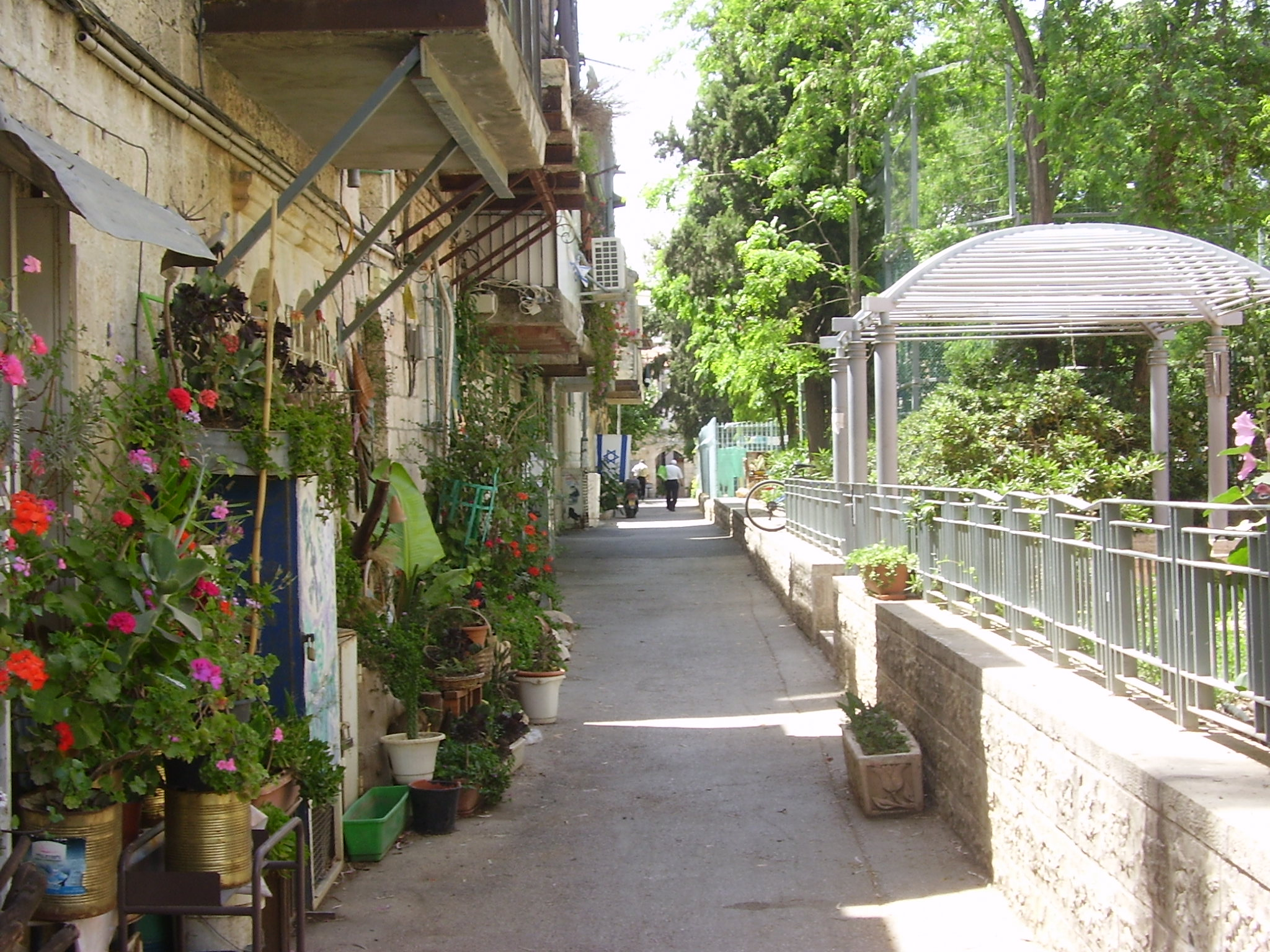
A street in Mazkeret Moshe

Mazkeret Moshe (Hebrew: מזכרת משה) is a former courtyard neighborhood in Jerusalem. Today it is part of the Nachlaot neighborhood.

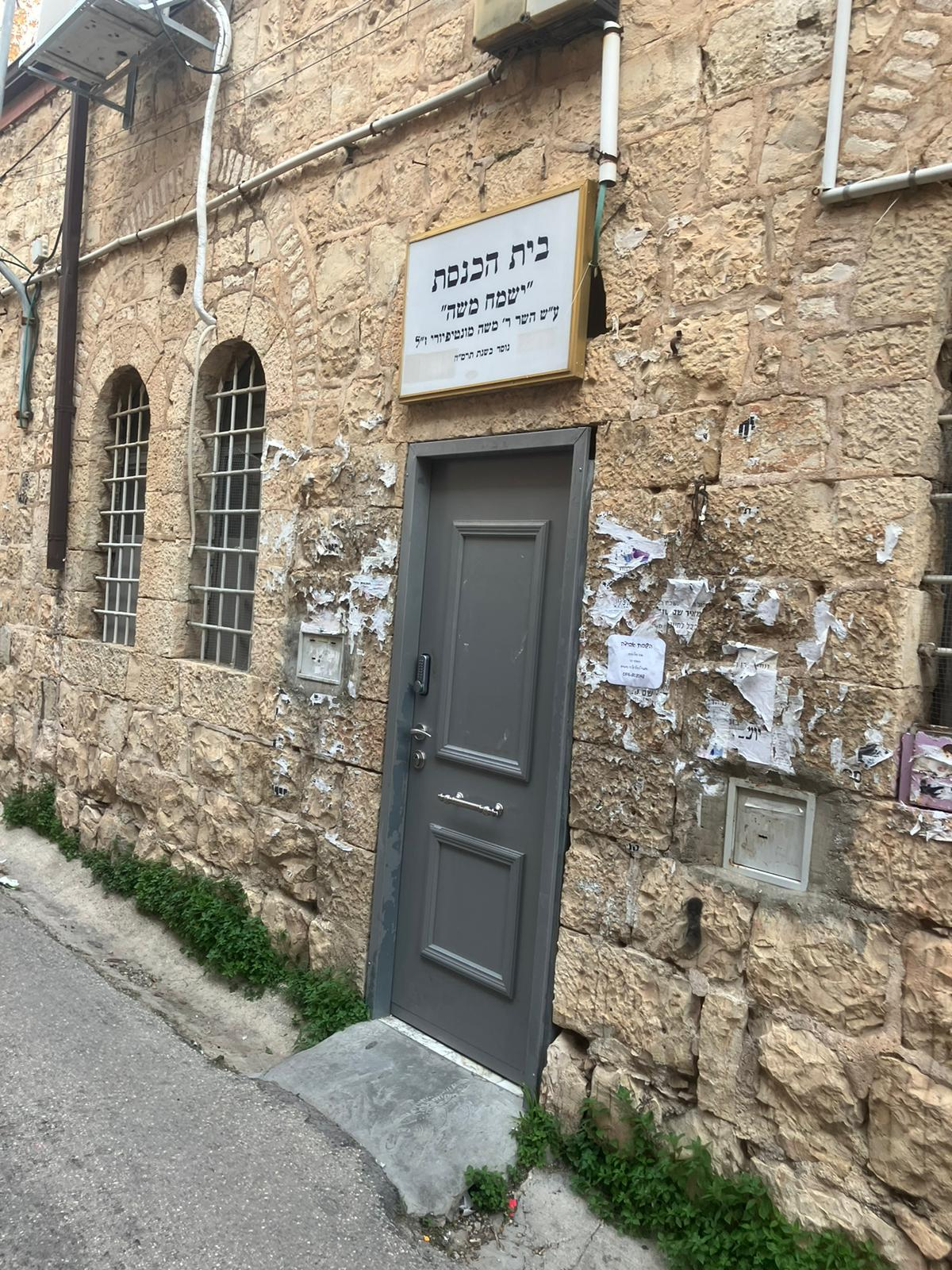
The Ashkenazic synagogue of Mazkeret Moshe. While it is officially called "Yismach Moshe" as it says on the sign, it is generally referred to by local Hareidi residents as Mazkeres, the Ashkenazic pronunciation of the neighborhood and the street where it is located.

Mazkeret Moshe was founded in 1882 from the ardent financial support of British Jewish financier and banker, Moses Montefiore. The name "Mazkeret Moshe" means "memorial to Moses." The neighborhood was intended for Ashkenazi Jews, while the adjacent neighborhood Ohel Moshe, also funded by Montefiore's foundation, was intended for Sephardi Jews.

The Wiener Heritage Center, an archive of historic photographs, is located in Mazkeret Moshe.

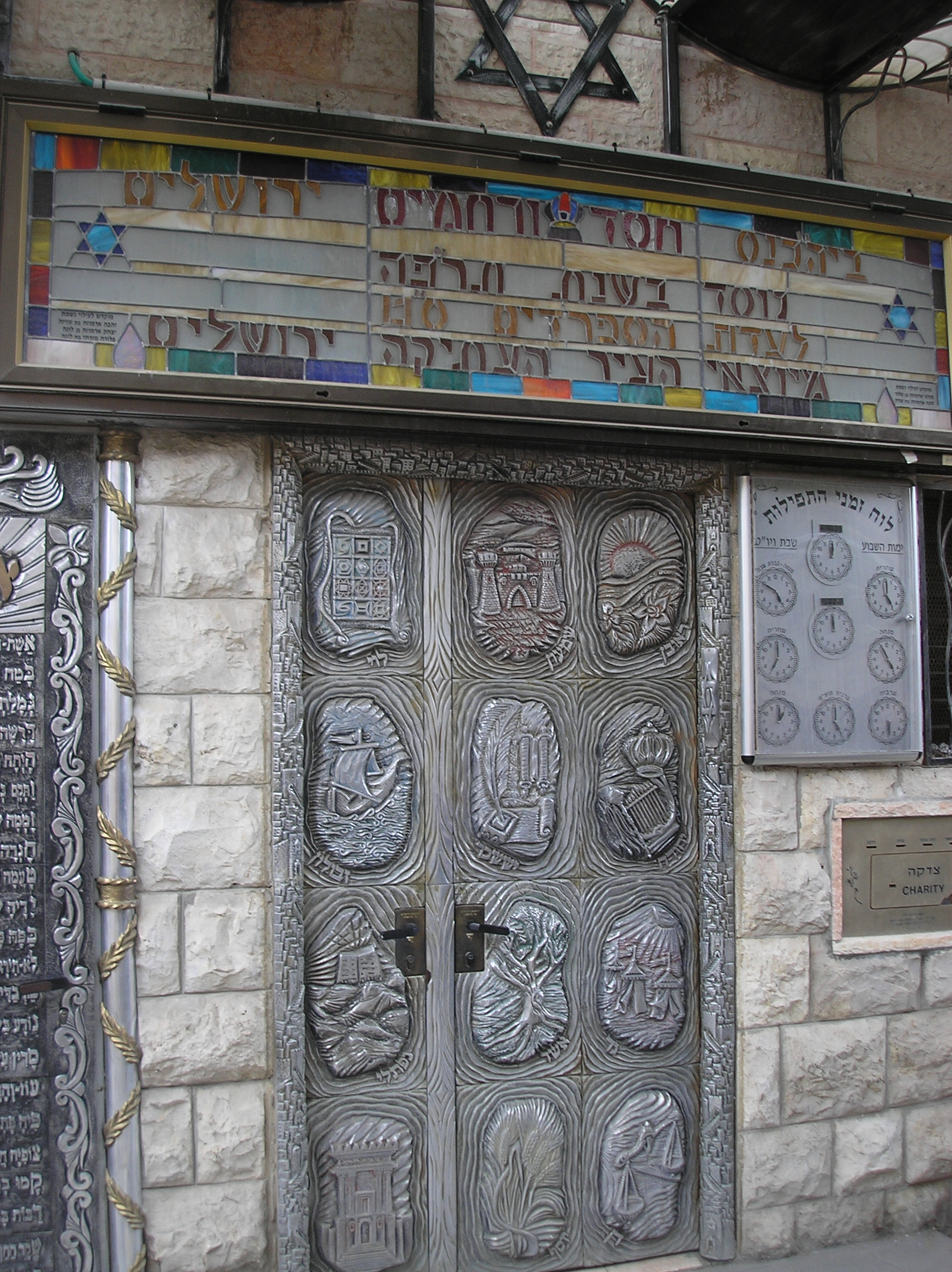
Hessed Verahamim doors

Hessed Verahamim synagogue is a Sephardi synagogue in Mazkeret Moshe that was once a pub. In the late 1920s, the neighborhood butcher convinced the pub owner to turn the building into a synagogue. The doors are covered with silver plates illustrating the Twelve Tribes.

== See also ==
- Architecture in Israel
- History of Jerusalem
