= Courtyard neighborhood =

Coordinates: 32°3′40.55″N 34°45′56.13″E

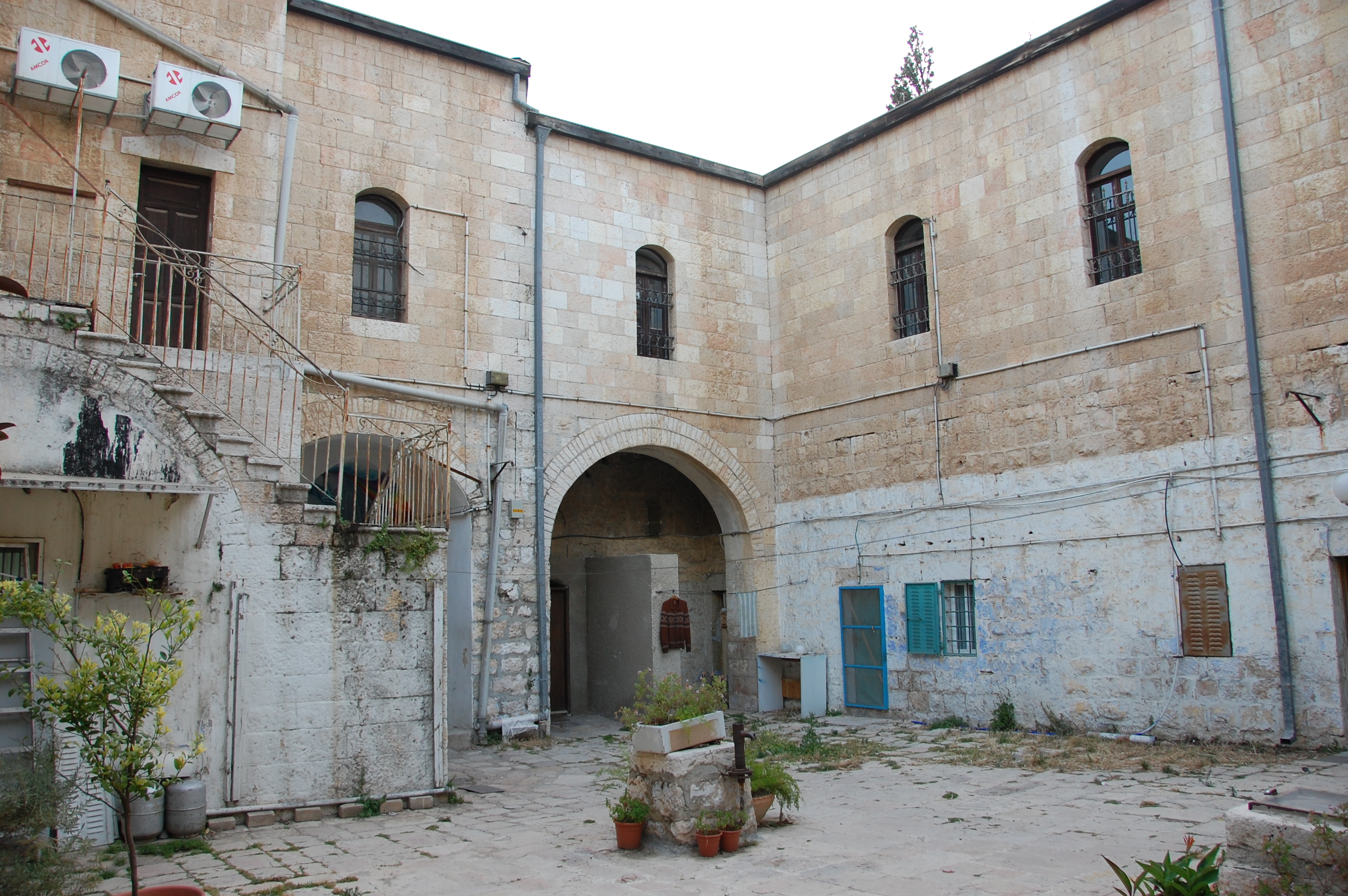
Beit David courtyard neighborhood in Jerusalem

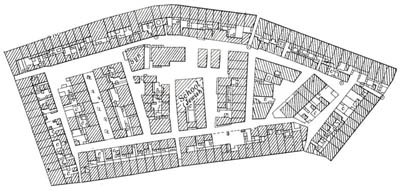
Map of Mea Shearim, a courtyard neighborhood in Jerusalem

Courtyard neighborhoods are Jewish neighborhoods built in Jerusalem and Tel Aviv in the late 19th and early 20th centuries. The inward-facing and defensible traditional urban housing of the Near East, ordinarily occupied by an extended family, was adapted in these cases to serve a close-knit but genealogically unrelated community.

== Description ==
Courtyard neighborhoods were built around a large courtyard. A surrounding wall protected against hostile outsiders. Most of the houses were close together, with one gap that was easy to defend. The courtyard typically holds a neighborhood cistern. Such neighborhoods reflected the residents' communal organization.

Typically, the apartments surrounding the courtyard were small (usually a studio apartment for each family), pushing many household tasks into the courtyard. In Jerusalem each family had one laundry day every two weeks. Hand-washing the clothing consumed many hours. That day the housewife cooked only for her household.

== Neighborhoods ==
The Jerusalem neighborhood of Nachlaot (now known as part of the extended Lev Ha'Ir borough) consists of 23 historical courtyard neighborhoods.

In Tel Aviv the classic example is the neighborhood of Neve Tzedek.
