= The Ballad of Yoel Moshe Salomon =

1970 song by Arik Einstein

"Habalada al Yoel Moshe Salomon"

Song by Arik Einstein

from the album Shablool
- Language: Hebrew
- English title: The Ballad of Yoel Moshe Salomon
- Released: May 1970
- Recorded: 1969
- Genre: Israeli rock
- Length: 3:33
- Composer: Shalom Hanoch
- Lyricist: Yoram Taharlev
- Producer: Tzvi Shissel

"The Ballad of Yoel Moshe Salomon" (Hebrew: הבלדה על יואל משה סלומון, romanized: Habalada al Yoel Moshe Salomon) is a 1970 Israeli popular song recorded by Arik Einstein, with lyrics by Yoram Taharlev and music by Shalom Hanoch. The song narrates, in a stylized and imaginative manner, a journey by several of the Jewish founders of the Petah Tikva moshava (Note: Hebrew מושבה moshava refers to communities of privately owned farms, and is conventionally rendered in English as 'colony'.) to survey land near the Palestinian Arab village of Mulabbis, where the colony was later established.

The song gave rise to a controversy among descendants of Petah Tikva’s founders concerning the respective roles of their ancestors in the establishment of the settlement. It has also been discussed by scholars and commentators as an example of how popular music in Israel contributes to the creation and perpetuation of historical myths.

== Historical background ==
Jewish philanthropists began acquiring land for agricultural purposes in Palestine in the 1850s. In 1855, Moses Montefiore purchased approximately ten hectares of orange groves outside Jaffa, to be cultivated by local Jewish residents. Also in the 1850s, Shaul Yehuda, a Baghdadi Jew, bought a farm near Qaluniya. In 1870, the Alliance Israélite Universelle established the Mikveh Israel agricultural school about five kilometres south of Jaffa on 260 hectares of land leased from the Turkish government.

The religiously observant members of the Old Yishuv in Jerusalem who founded Petah Tikva initially faced difficulties acquiring land. (Note: For brief discussions of the Old Yishuv and its early agricultural settlement activity, see Sachar (2007, chapter 2), the sections titled The “Old Settlement” and The “Old Settlement” Stirs, respectively. See also Shapira (2014, chapter 2), particularly the section titled Emigrants and Immigrants: An Overview. The article Jewish land purchase in Palestine has some information on Ottoman restrictions on Jewish land purchases and settlement.) The group arranged to buy 4,000 dunams near Hebron in 1875, but the Palestinian intermediary retained the property for himself. Another effort to purchase land at Khirbat Deiran near Ramla was unsuccessful; that site was eventually acquired in 1890 for Polish Jewish settlers who established the colony of Rehovot. (Note: The Hebrew Wikipedia article on the Ballad mentions the earlier failed attempt.) In 1876, the future founders of Petah Tikva also attempted to obtain land near Jericho, intending to name their settlement Petah Tikva ("Opening of Hope"), a biblical reference linked to the Achor valley. (Note: "And I will give her her vineyards therefrom, and the valley of Achor as a door of hope." (Hosea 2:17)) The name was later applied to the colony near Jaffa.

In 1878, land northeast of Jaffa, near the village of Umlabes, became available. (Note: The village name is pronounced Umlabes in the song, and written thus on web page on malaria in Israel. Other English sources represent it differently. It is Mulabbes in Yaari (1958, p. 79), Melabes in Glass & Kark (1991, p. 137) and in Shapira (2014, chapter 2), and Ummlebis in Avneri (1984, p. 71). The Wikipedia article Petah Tikva gives three other versions.) It was owned by two Christian businessmen from Jaffa, Antoine Basher Tayan and Selim Qassar, and cultivated by about thirty tenant farmers. Tayan’s property, covering approximately 8,500 dunams, included areas of malarial swamp in the Yarkon River Valley. Qassar’s 3,500-dunam holding, located farther south and on higher ground, was purchased on 30 July 1878. The Tayan lands were bought later when a second group of settlers, the Yarkonim, arrived in 1879.

A malaria outbreak in 1880 led to the temporary abandonment of the settlement, with survivors relocating to Yehud. Petah Tikva was reoccupied in 1883 by Bilu settlers, joined by some of the original families. Edmond James de Rothschild provided financial support for drainage of the swamps, contributing to the settlement’s stability. The founders and early settlers of Petah Tikva are generally identified as Zerah Barnett, David Gutmann, Eleazar Raab and his sons Yehuda and Moshe Shmuel Raab, Yoel Moshe Salomon, and Yehoshua Stampfer. Some accounts also include Nathan Gringart (who provided financing to the colony but didn't actually take up residence there), Michal Leib Katz (Zanger), (Note: The Hebrew Wikipedia article on Petah Tikva mentions Katz (Zanger), as does Yaari (1958, p. 85). The latter says he joined the colony shortly after its founding.) and Aryeh Leib Frumkin, one of the Yarkonim.

== Yaari's account of the Umlabes inspection ==
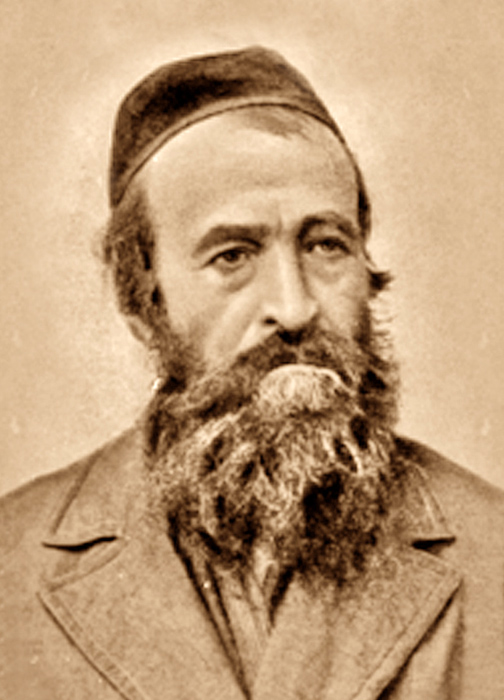
Yoel Moshe Salomon

Yoram Taharlev was inspired to write The Ballad of Yoel Moshe Salomon after reading the account of Petah Tikva’s founding in Avraham Yaari’s Memories of the Land of Israel (1947). Yaari’s narrative was based on a version of events recorded by Tuviah Salomon, son of Yoel Moshe Salomon, in the 1929 Petah Tikva 50th Anniversary Commemorative volume.

According to Yaari’s account, in the summer of 1878, four prospective land purchasers—David Gutmann, Yoel Moshe Salomon, Yehoshua Stampfer, and Zerach Barnett—traveled from Jaffa to examine land near the village of Umlabes, the future site of Petah Tikva. After spending the day there, they were generally impressed but concerned by the unhealthy appearance of the local tenant farmers. That evening, Gutmann, Stampfer, and Barnett returned to Jaffa, while Salomon, who spoke Arabic, remained to make further inquiries about the health of the fellahin.

Salomon learned that the farmers’ poor health was attributed to the swampy conditions of the Yarkon River Valley. Upon returning to his colleagues, he suggested purchasing land farther south, near the village of Yahudiyah, away from the Yarkon River. To address concerns about the land’s suitability for settlement, the group engaged a Greek physician to assess the site. From the top of a ruined building, the doctor observed the area and noted the absence of birds despite the availability of food sources. He concluded that the land was unhealthy and unfit for habitation.

Despite this assessment, Salomon, Gutmann, and Stampfer—Barnett not being mentioned as present during the second visit—chose to proceed with the purchase, initially acquiring only Selim Qassar’s parcel of land, situated away from the river.

== The Ballad ==
The Ballad of Yoel Moshe Salomon recounts the visit to Umlabes—the site that would later become Petah Tikva—by those who subsequently purchased the surrounding lands. Yoram Taharlev’s rendition diverges from Avraham Yaari’s historical account in several respects.

Taharlev noted that he merged what Yaari described as two separate visits into a single event. He also identified the Greek doctor mentioned in the earlier account by name, calling him Dr. Mazaraki, and portrayed Yoel Moshe Salomon as the central heroic figure—the only one of the four to disregard the doctor’s warning.

The first recorded mention of Dr. Mazaraki in connection with the founding of Petah Tikva appeared six years after the events, in an article published in the 1884 issue of a Hebrew literary annual, where the name was rendered as אזראייקע (Azrayike). According to historian Yosef Lang, there were two Mazaraki brothers in Jerusalem, both physicians who had at various times been affiliated with the Misgav Ladach hospital. Lang identifies the elder brother, Karlemo Mazaraki, as the likely individual who advised the founders of Petah Tikva regarding the health risks posed by the Yarkon Valley’s swamps.

The ballad opens with the line בבוקר לח בשנת תרל"ח (beboker lach bishnat tarlach), meaning "On a humid morning in the year 1878". (Note: In the Hebrew article on the Ballad (בלדה על יואל משה סלומון), the year of the inspection is identified as 1876. That date seems to be based on a letter from Joseph Navon to the British vice-consul in Jaffa, his uncle Haim Amzalak, as reported in Glass & Kark (1991, p. 137), in which Navon says that the Petah Tikva founders had approached him for assistance in obtaining land. Glass and Kark report that it was through Amzalak that they learned about the Umlabes land. (The name Amzalak is sometimes rendered Amzaleg or Amzalleg.)) It describes five riders departing from Jaffa. The second verse names four—Yehoshua Stampfer, David Gutmann, Zerach Barnett, and Yoel Moshe Salomon—who are to become the founders of Petah Tikva. Salomon is depicted heroically, "with a sword in his sash" The fifth rider, Dr. Mazaraki, is introduced in the third verse as they travel through the Yarkon River Valley.

Upon reaching Umlabes, described as a place of "swamps and thickets", the riders ascend a hill to survey the landscape. In verses five and six, Dr. Mazaraki delivers his assessment, noting the absence of birdsong as a sign of disease and declaring the area unfit for habitation. He advises the group to depart, saying: "If no birds are heard, death reigns here. My advice is that we leave this place quickly, so off I go". In the following verse, the doctor departs for the city with Stampfer, Gutmann, and Barnett, leaving only Salomon behind.

In verse eight, Salomon, described as having "prophetic eyes", remains alone through the night. The final four verses shift in tone from narrative to legend. During the night, Salomon is said to sprout wings and fly over the valley—an image the song presents ambiguously, suggesting "maybe it was just a dream, maybe just a legend". By morning, the valley is filled with birdsong, and the ballad concludes with the assertion that "to this day, along the Yarkon, the birds sing of Yoel Moshe Salomon".

== Recording and public recognition ==
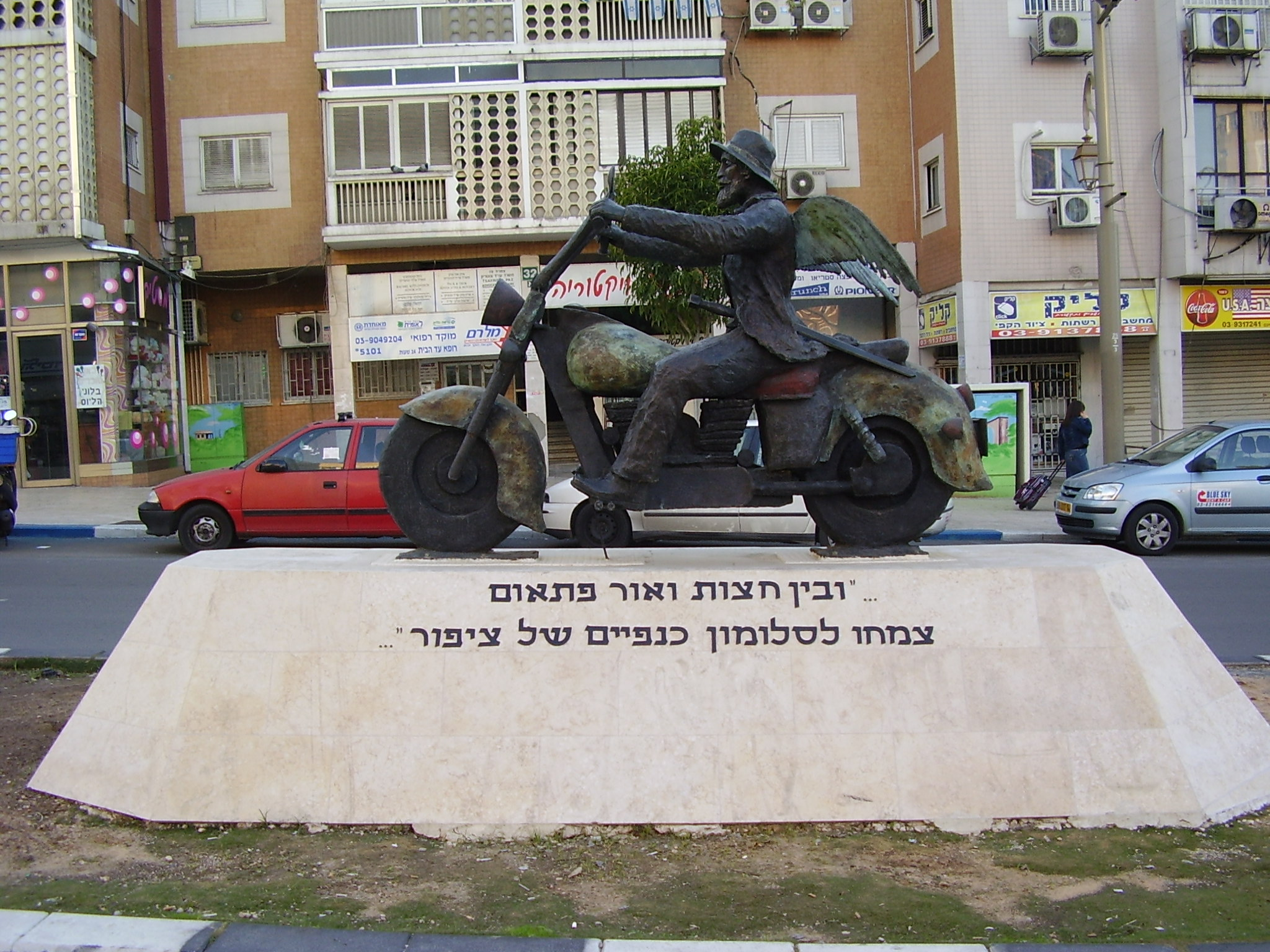
Winged Yoel Moshe Salomon – Statue by Rami Golshani

The Ballad of Yoel Moshe Salomon was first recorded in 1970 by Arik Einstein. It appeared as the final track on Shablul ("Snail"), a collaborative and influential album by Einstein and composer Shalom Hanoch, and was also featured in an accompanying film of the same name. The song was later included on Einstein’s 1973 album Good Old Eretz Yisrael.

The ballad achieved enduring popularity, and its version of events became a significant element in the collective memory of Petah Tikva’s founding. In 2000, artist Avi Blitshtein created a mural based on the song in the underpass at the Geha Junction in Petah Tikva. The mural depicts the five figures from the ballad standing before a hill and surrounded by birds. Blitshtein used photographs provided by the municipality as references; however, no image of Dr. Mazaraki was available, (Note: A photo of Dr. Mazaraki is available at Eshed (2008). Eshed attributes it to Elizabeth Anne Finn, the wife of the British consul in Jerusalem (1846–1863).) so he depicted the doctor based on his imagination. A photograph supplied for Zerach Barnett was later found to have been a misidentification—it was actually an image of Avraham Shapira, who had served as head of Petah Tikva’s village guard from 1890 onward. (Note: Eshed (2008) has photos of the entire mural and of the individuals as Blitshtein portrayed them.)

The 130th anniversary of Petah Tikva’s founding in 2008 brought renewed public attention to the ballad. On 5 November 2008, five riders dressed in period costume reenacted the journey from Jaffa to Petah Tikva, mirroring the figures in Taharlev’s lyrics. An updated humorous version of the ballad imagined a 170-year-old Yoel Moshe Salomon and his companions stuck in modern-day traffic between Jaffa and Petah Tikva. The reenactment concluded at Founders Square in Petah Tikva, where five sculptures by artist Shmuel Ben-Ami were unveiled.

Ben-Ami’s sculptures were commissioned by a local Petah Tikva company, which instructed him to replace the figure of Dr. Mazaraki—whose likeness was unavailable—with a representation of Yehuda Raab, another recognized founder of Petah Tikva, though not mentioned in the ballad.

In addition, a separate statue by sculptor Rami Golshani has been installed on Haim Ozer Street in Petah Tikva. It portrays Yoel Moshe Salomon with wings, riding a Harley-Davidson motorcycle. The statue’s base bears a Hebrew line from the song: "And between midnight and first light, all of a sudden Salomon grew the wings of a bird".

== Controversies ==
According to Israeli historian Yosef Lang, debate over the founding of Petah Tikva began with the publication of the settlement’s 50th anniversary commemorative volume in 1929. That volume presented the Salomon family’s version of events, which differed from accounts offered by other descendants of the founders. The disputes center on who participated in the founding, at what stage, and in what role. Many of those involved in these disagreements are themselves descendants or relatives of the original settlers, and each tends to emphasize the contribution of their own family. As literary scholar Yaffah Berlovitz, a great-granddaughter of Zerach Barnett, wrote: "As many founders as there are, there are that many histories of the place, and each family writes a biographical version of its own as the history of the colony".

Writer Eli Eshed, a member of the Salomon family and commentator on Israeli popular culture, has referred to these disputes as "version wars". The Ballad of Yoel Moshe Salomon became a focal point in this long-standing controversy when its portrayal of events was widely used in the 130th-anniversary celebrations of Petah Tikva. The ballad’s prominence in public commemorations prompted discussion in Israeli newspapers and formal complaints to the municipality.

During an interview with Eshed, Berlovitz criticized the depiction of Yoel Moshe Salomon as a heroic figure, noting that he had previously discouraged the Yarkonim settlers and later returned to Jerusalem. She stated that "to present him as a hero, it’s really ridiculous, even with the apologetics at the end that say that it’s a story or a dream". Similarly, writer Ehud ben Ezer, a descendant of Eleazar and Yehuda Raab, objected to the limited recognition given to his family in official celebrations. He expressed concern that the ballad was being treated as a historical source rather than a work of art, quoting a municipal official who told him that "the history is what Yoram Taharlev wrote". Ben Ezer added that the education system, including textbooks and teachers, appeared to rely on the song as "the single authorized source for teaching about the history of Petah Tikva".

These concerns have been echoed in scholarly and popular writing. In historian Howard Sachar’s widely cited A History of Israel, Yoel Moshe Salomon is the only individual mentioned in relation to Petah Tikva’s founding.

At the center of the debate lies the role of Israeli music in shaping national identity and historical memory. Taharlev himself acknowledged this dynamic, commenting that "it is in the nature of a mythological song that it created a myth". and noting that a similar debate arose around his Six-Day War song Ammunition Hill. (Note: The song Ammunition Hill deals with the Battle of Ammunition Hill, fought in the northern suburbs of Jerusalem on 6 June 1967. An English translation of the lyrics is available at Ben-Arieh, Alex. "The Army Bands: Lahakot Tzahal". The Historama. A transliteration of the Hebrew can be found at Jakubovits, George. "Givat HaTachmoshet". HebrewSongs.com. The Hebrew lyrics are available at "גבעת התחמושת". Shironet (in Hebrew).)

Ben Ezer compared learning about the founding of Petah Tikva from The Ballad of Yoel Moshe Salomon to learning about th 1948 Palestine War solely through Nathan Alterman’s poem Silver Platter. He warned that the actual events risked being forgotten, "leaving only the songs". and questioned whether Israel’s history might one day be confused with the history of its poetry and song.

The type of music to which Ben Ezer referred—zemer ivri ("Hebrew Song") or shirei eretz yisrael ("Songs of the Land of Israel")—is a genre of Zionist folk music that emerged during the yishuv and became an established cultural canon. The songs typically celebrated the land of Israel, Hebrew labor, and the Israeli Defense Forces, and served an ideological and educational function. The Ballad of Yoel Moshe Salomon was written during what musicologists Motti Regev and Edwin Seroussi identify as the middle period of this genre, when the style was acquiring a nostalgic quality. The ballad adopted a more playful tone than earlier examples, yet, like other zemer ivri, it contributed to the creation of a historical memory in which myth and historical facts are intertwined. Though not a factual account, the ballad has played a significant role in preserving public awareness of the founding of Petah Tikva within Israel’s collective memory.

== Sources ==
- Adler, Gerald M. (25 September 2008). "External Responses to Ottoman Internal Changes". The Palestinian - Israel Conflict: Legal Aspects in a Historical and Political Context.
- Avneri, Arieh L. (1984). The Claim of Dispossession: Jewish Land-Settlement and the Arabs, 1878-1948. New Brunswick and London: Transaction Books. ISBN 978-0878559640.
- Ben Ezer, Ehud (2 December 2013). "The Yarkonim Affair" [פרשת הירקונים]. Ben Ezer News [חדשות בן עזר], no. 896 (in Hebrew).
- Berlovitz, Yaffa (14 November 2008). "כמספר המייסדים כן מספר ההיסטוריות של פתח תקוה–בעקבות המהומה שחוללה "הבלדה על יואל משה סלומון"" [As there are many founders, so too there are many histories of Petah Tikva–on the commotion caused by the Ballad of Yoel Moshe Salomon]. Ha’aretz (in Hebrew).
- Eshed, Eli (19 November 2008). "בבוקר לח בשנת תרל"ח -המלחמות על "הבלדה על יואל משה סלומון"" [On a damp morning in 1878-the wars surrounding "The Ballad of Yoel Moshe Salomon"]. המולטי יקום של אלי אשד Eli Eshed’s Multiverse (in Hebrew). This page is a discussion (in Hebrew) of the Ballad and of the controversy it generated, with excerpts from interviews with many of those involved, including Yoram Taharlev, Yaffa Berlovitz, Ehud Ben Ezer, Avi Blitshtein, and Shmuel Ben Ami. The page also contains a number of photos of individuals and art works connected to the Ballad, including one purported to be of Dr. Mazaraki.
- Glass, Joseph B.; Kark, Ruth (1991). Sephardi Entrepreneurs in Eretz Israel: The Amzalak Family, 1816-1918. Jerusalem: Magnes Press. ISBN 978-9652237514.
- Lang, Yossi (2 March 2009). "The Physician Brothers of the House of Mazaraki" [האחים הרופאים לבית מַזַרַקִי]. Ben Ezer News [חדשות בן עזר], no. 424 (in Hebrew).
- Orni, Efraim; Gilboa, Shaked (2007). "Mikveh Israel". Encyclopaedia Judaica. Vol. 14 (2nd ed.). Detroit: Macmillan Reference USA. ISBN 978-0-02-865942-8.
- Regev, Motti; Seroussi, Edwin (2004). Popular Music and National Culture in Israel. Berkeley: University of California Press. ISBN 978-0-520-23652-3.
- Sachar, Howard M. (2007). A History of Israel: From the Rise of Zionism to Our Time. New York: Alfred A. Knopf. ISBN 978-0375711329.
- Shapira, Anita (2014). Israel: A History. Lebanon, NH: Brandeis University Press. ISBN 978-0297871576.
- Yaari, Avraham (1958) [1947]. The Goodly Heritage: Memoirs Describing the Life of the Jewish Community of Eretz Yisrael From the Seventeenth to the Twentieth Centuries [זכרונות ארץ ישראל (Memories of the Land of Israel)]. Translated and abridged by Israel Schen; edited by Isaac Halevy-Levin. Jerusalem: Youth and Hechalutz Dept. of the Zionist Organization.
