= Yoel Moshe Salomon =

Hebrew newspaper publisher and co-founder of towns

- יואל משה סלומון
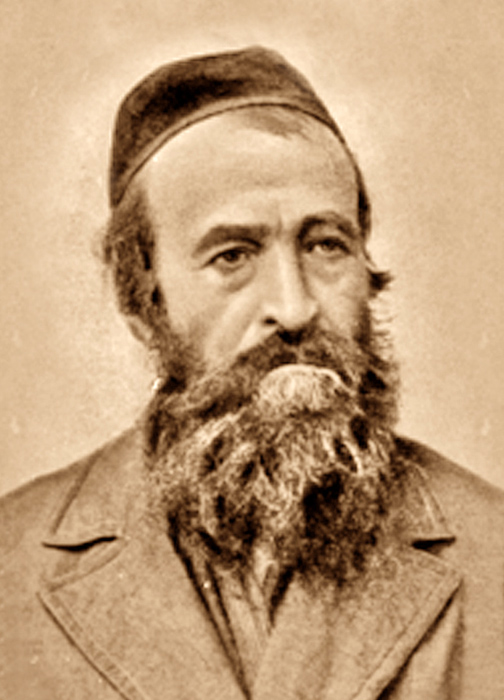
- Born: March 15, 1838; Jerusalem, Palestine
- Died: October 23, 1912 (aged 74)
- Other name: Joel Moses Salomon
- Occupations: Meshulach; publisher; entrepreneur; farmer
- Known for: Co-founding Nahalat Shiv'a and Petah Tikva

Yoel Moshe Salomon (or Joel Moses Salomon; Hebrew: יואל משה סלומון; 15 March 1838 – 23 October 1912) was a meshulach (Jewish diaspora emissary), entrepreneur and farmer in Ottoman Palestine. He was one of the co-founders of HaLevanon, the first Hebrew language newspaper printed in Palestine. He co-founded numerous Jewish settlements there, including Nahalat Shiv'a, Petah Tikva and Yehud.

== Early life ==
Yoel Moshe Salomon was born to Mordechai, a Lithuanian Jew, in Jerusalem. His grandfather was Shlomo Zalman Zoref, one of a group of 500 disciples of the Vilna Gaon who left their native Lithuania and made aliyah (emigrated to the Land of Israel) between 1808 and 1813. Zoref himself landed in Acre, Ottoman Palestine on 9 October 1811. He was killed by an Arab when Salomon was 13 years old.

== Career ==
=== Publishing ===
While they were in Germany collecting funds for the Old Yishuv, Saloman and his friend Michal HaCohen learned the art of printing in Königsberg in Prussia. After acquiring the necessary equipment, they returned to Jerusalem in 1862 and founded one of the first Hebrew printing presses in the city, the Salomon Printing Press. The operation produced the first lithograph fabricated in Palestine, known as the shoshanta. While folded, it resembled a red rose. When it was opened, artistic depictions of Jerusalem's Gates and the Western Wall were revealed.

On 20 February 1863 the partners founded there, along with Yehiel Bril, HaLevanon, the first Hebrew language newspaper printed in Palestine. After the Ottoman authorities shut it down after only 12 issues, Bril moved the paper's operations to Paris, from where he published it for another 14 years. In 1877, Salomon founded a bi-weekly Hebrew magazine called Yehuda Virushalayim. From within its pages, he exhorted his readership to "exit the world of contemplation and talk, into the world of action" by adopting an agrarian lifestyle and settling the Land of Israel.

=== Founding of towns ===
Salomon's father had represented the local Jewish community during negotiations between Moses Montefiore and the Ottoman authorities. Some of the discussions involved land purchases, and Salomon proved himself to be even more adept than his father in these endeavours. In 1866, a cholera epidemic impacted the overcrowded neighbourhoods inside the Old City's walls, decimating much of the population. Recognising that the residents of Mishkenot Sha'ananim, the first new neighbourhood in West Jerusalem, were largely unaffected by this calamity, Salomon and other Jerusalem activists decided that the time had come to expand the city outside of its walls. In 1869, he and six other community leaders founded a new neighbourhood just outside Jaffa Gate, which they named Nahalat Shiv'a (lit. 'Heritage of Seven'). The street grid was laid out haphazardly, and the alleys were of similar proportions to what had been commonplace in the Old City. Salomon's house, one of the first three that were built in the neighbourhood, was situated on the south side of busy Jaffa Road. Salomon eventually moved his printing press business to this location.

Through a desire to start a self-sufficient Jewish agricultural colony (moshava), Salomon in 1878 enlisted the help of Yehoshua Stampfer, Zerah Barnett, and David Meir Gutmann, who helped to organise a group of one hundred shareholders. They initially looked at lands in Achor, but the group was thwarted by brigands in the employ of the halukka (charity distribution) leaders, who were suspicious of Salomon's motives. Salomon's group soon turned its attention to the lands of Mullabis, an Arab town near the swampy Yarkon River basin, which it purchased at a bargain. The colony, founded in July of that year, was named Petah Tikva (lit. 'Portal of Hope'). The conditions were harsh, with ramshackle cottages being swept away by mud. But a deadly malaria outbreak in 1880 prompted the pioneers, including Salomon, to look for a better location. In 1883, they found a site 7 kilometres south of Petah Tikva and purchased plots there, naming it Yehud. After one year, when the other evacuees began to slowly return to Petah Tikva, Salomon castigated them. He insisted that it was too dangerous to go back there, instead purchasing land in what would become Kfar Saba. Eventually however, he returned to Jerusalem, where he lived for the rest of his life.

In 1898, a dispute arose between New Yishuv and Old Yishuv leaders in Jaffa over who would head the Jewish Community council there. As a result, an unlikely alliance developed between the New Yishuv, Moroccan Jews and the Hasidic community on the one hand, against the Perushim on the other. The latter were accused by the former of trying to exert undue influence over the council. Salomon and Yaakov Meir were dispatched to Jaffa on behalf of Jerusalem's Old Yishuv leadership in order to try and mediate between the parties, but they were unsuccessful. Naftali Herz HaLevi was installed as rabbi of the community as a compromise. While the latter made efforts to unite the various factions, ultimately he was perceived to be operating under direct influence of the Old Yishuv rabbis in Jerusalem. The tumult subsided after Abraham Isaac Kook was appointed Chief Rabbi of Jaffa in 1908.

== Legacy ==
Yoel Moshe Salomon Street in Nahalat Shiv'a, named for Salomon, was converted to a pedestrian zone in the late 1980s.

In 1970, Arik Einstein recorded a song written by Yoram Taharlev called The Ballad of Yoel Moshe Salomon. The song, which paints a picture of Salomon as principal founder of Petah Tikva, stirred up controversy in 2008, the 130th anniversary of the city's founding. Descendants of the city's other acknowledged founders—Yehoshua Stampfer, Zerah Barnett, and Eleazar Raab—complained that the songwriter had perpetuated false narratives. Yosef Lang contended that while various competing narratives existed surrounding Petah Tikva's founding, it was Salomon's descendants' version, first advanced in 1929 during the city's jubilee celebration, that really took hold.

== Sources ==
Hassan, Hassan Ahmad; al-Kayyali, Abdul-Hameed (13 August 2018). "Chapter 16: Ben-Yehuda in his Ottoman Milieu". In Dalachanis, Angelos; Lemire, Vincent (eds.). Ordinary Jerusalem, 1840-1940: Opening New Archives, Revisiting a Global City. Brill Publishers. pp. 330–351. ISBN 978-90-04-37574-1.
