= Stampfer =

Stampfer is a German language surname. Notable people with the surname include:

- Simon von Stampfer (1792 (1790) – 1864), Austrian mathematician
- Yehoshua Stampfer (1852–1908), one of the founders of Petah Tikva in Israel
- Shaul Stampfer (born 1948), American Jewish historian
- Wolfgang Stamppfer (born 1972), Austrian bobsledder

== See also ==
- 3440 Stampfer, main-belt asteroid
