= HaLevanon =

Hebrew-language newspaper

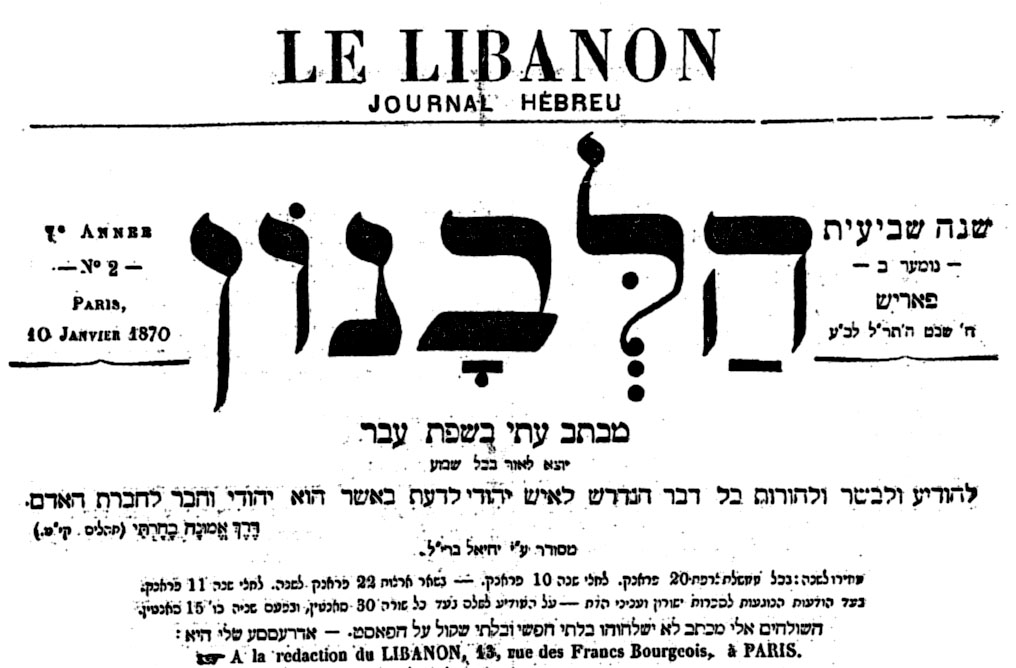
- Type: Magazine
- Founder(s): Yehiel Bril, Michal HaCohen, Yoel Moshe Salomon
- Founded: 1863; 163 years ago
- Ceased publication: 1886; 140 years ago
- Language: Hebrew
- City: Jerusalem (1863–c. 1865); Paris (c. 1865–1870s); Mainz (1870s–1880s); London (1880s–1886)
- Free online archives: www.nli.org.il/en/newspapers/hlb

HaLevanon (Hebrew: הלבנון, lit. 'The Lebanon') was a newspaper in Ottoman Palestine, and the first Hebrew-language newspaper published in the Land of Israel. Published between 1863 and 1886, its chief editor was Yehiel Bril. HaLevanon was at various points in time published in Jerusalem, Paris, Mainz and London.

== History ==
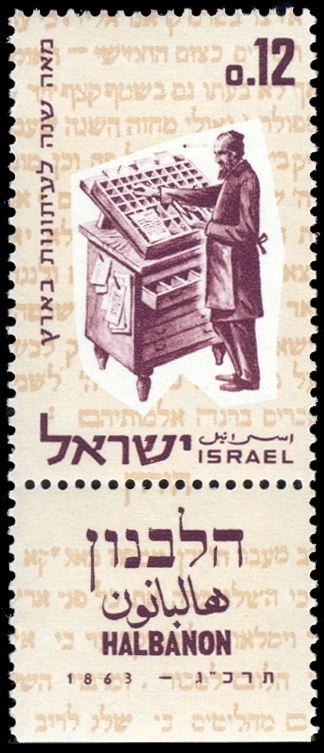
HaLevanon commemorative stamp, issued in 1963

HaLevanon was established in Jerusalem in early 1863 by Yehiel Bril, Michal HaCohen and Yoel Moshe Salomon. The paper originated from an effort by Jerusalem's Misnagdim to reduce their reliance on Yisrael Bak's Hasidic-aligned printing house, which resulted in Salomon and HaCohen studying printing at Königsberg, before conceiving HaLevanon upon their return. They subsequently established their own printing house at Nahalat Shiv'a and began its publication.

The paper was shut down by Ottoman authorities in December 1863 after being reported to them by Bak, who edited rival paper Havatzelet.

Beginning in 1865, Bril re-established HaLevanon in Paris as a bi-weekly magazine. Three years later, it began to be published on a weekly basis. Publication ceased in September 1870 after Bril left Paris to escape the Franco-Prussian War.

In August 1871, Bril and Marcus Lehmann resumed HaLevanon's publication in Mainz, this time as a weekly supplement to Der Israelit. The two editors cut ties in July 1881 and Ha-Levanon continued to be published as an independent newspaper until 1882, when in the aftermath of the 1881–1882 Pogroms in Russia Bril helped Jewish farmers from Russia move to Ottoman Palestine to establish the settlement of Ekron, which later became Mazkeret Batya.

In June 1886, Bril resumed HaLevanon's publication in London. The paper was discontinued later that year following Bril's death.

== Kvod HaLevanon ==
HaLevanon included a supplement called Kvod HaLevanon. It acted as a journal for halakha (Jewish law), alongside publications in the field of Wissenschaft des Judentums.

== See also ==
- Mass media in Israel
