= Hannah Trager =

English writer and activist

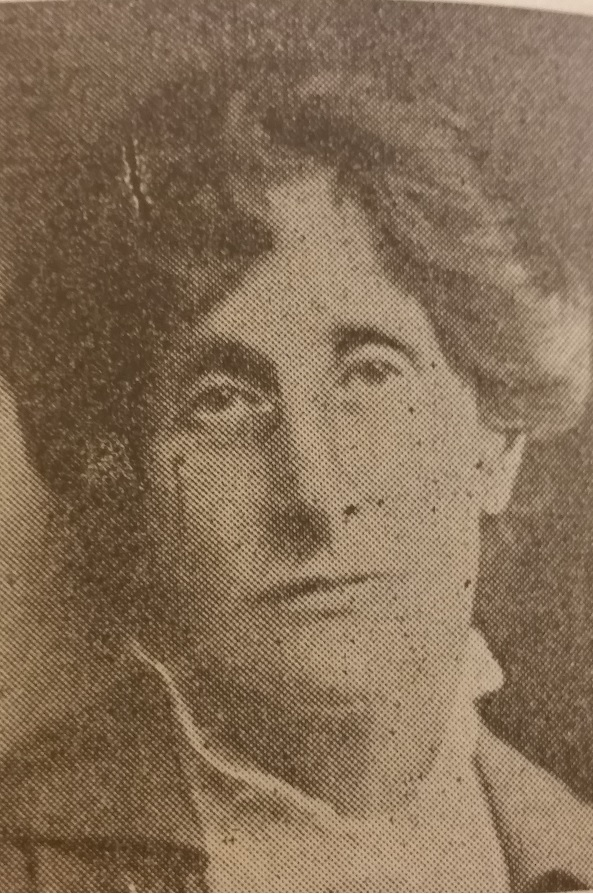
Hannah Barnett-Trager, undated

Hannah Barnett-Trager (born Hannah Barnett) (1870–1943) was an English writer and activist. She resided and worked primarily in Mandatory Palestine. Her father, Zerah Barnett, established the city of Petah Tikva

== Personal life ==
Trager was born in London, but emigrated with her parents to Jerusalem (then in the Ottoman Empire) in December 1871 when she was one year old. Her father, Zerah Barnett, was born in Lithuania in 1843 and came to London in 1864 to marry Rachel Leah Ha'Cohen and settled there establishing a successful factory for fur products, gaining British citizenship in October 1871. Being a devout Zionist, he believed in the return of the Jewish people to their original homeland after their expulsion 2000 years earlier. He travelled many times to Palestine to acquire lands and establish Jewish communities and returned to London 15 times in his lifetime, each time to acquire further wealth to buy more land. He was one of the founders of Mea Shearim, a Jewish community outside the city walls of Jerusalem and later the first Jewish agricultural community Petah Tikva, where the family lived from the mid-1870s to 1890. In 1890 the family moved to Jaffa where Hannah's father acquired land to found Neve Shalom, a Jewish neighbourhood in Jaffa, where he lived with his family for the rest of his life.

In 1887, after one of the family visits to London, Hannah remained when the others returned to Palestine. She married businessman Israel Gottman in 1888 and had two daughters; Gottman died young after business problems and bankruptcy affected his health. She supported herself and her daughters by working as a midwife, and married Joseph Trager, a chemist who was later incapacitated through tuberculosis. In 1911 her daughter Rose died aged 18 or 19, and her daughter Sarah committed suicide in 1924 aged 34 or 35. Sarah had suffered from malaria and neuritis after nursing in Palestine and later been diagnosed with consumption, had spent time in a mental hospital, and was determined to take her own life. Trager was initially charged with Sarah's murder by suicide pact, but was found not guilty in February 1925. She was also charged with attempted suicide, and pleaded guilty, but the judge bound her over with no other punishment. He said "You were the victim of misfortune. You are in every sense of the word a good and worthy woman of remarkable attainments. You have been dogged throughout life by the worst of bad luck. I hope that there will be a bright future in store for you."

In 1926, some two years after her mother's death, Hanna returned to Palestine and to join her father, her brothers and their families. She lived in Neve Shalom, by then a neighbourhood of Tel Aviv, where in 1929 she assisted her father in writing his memoirs, and later lived in Bene Berak. She died in September 1943 and was buried in Nahalat Yitzhak Cemetery. A street in Petah Tikva carries her name.

== Work ==
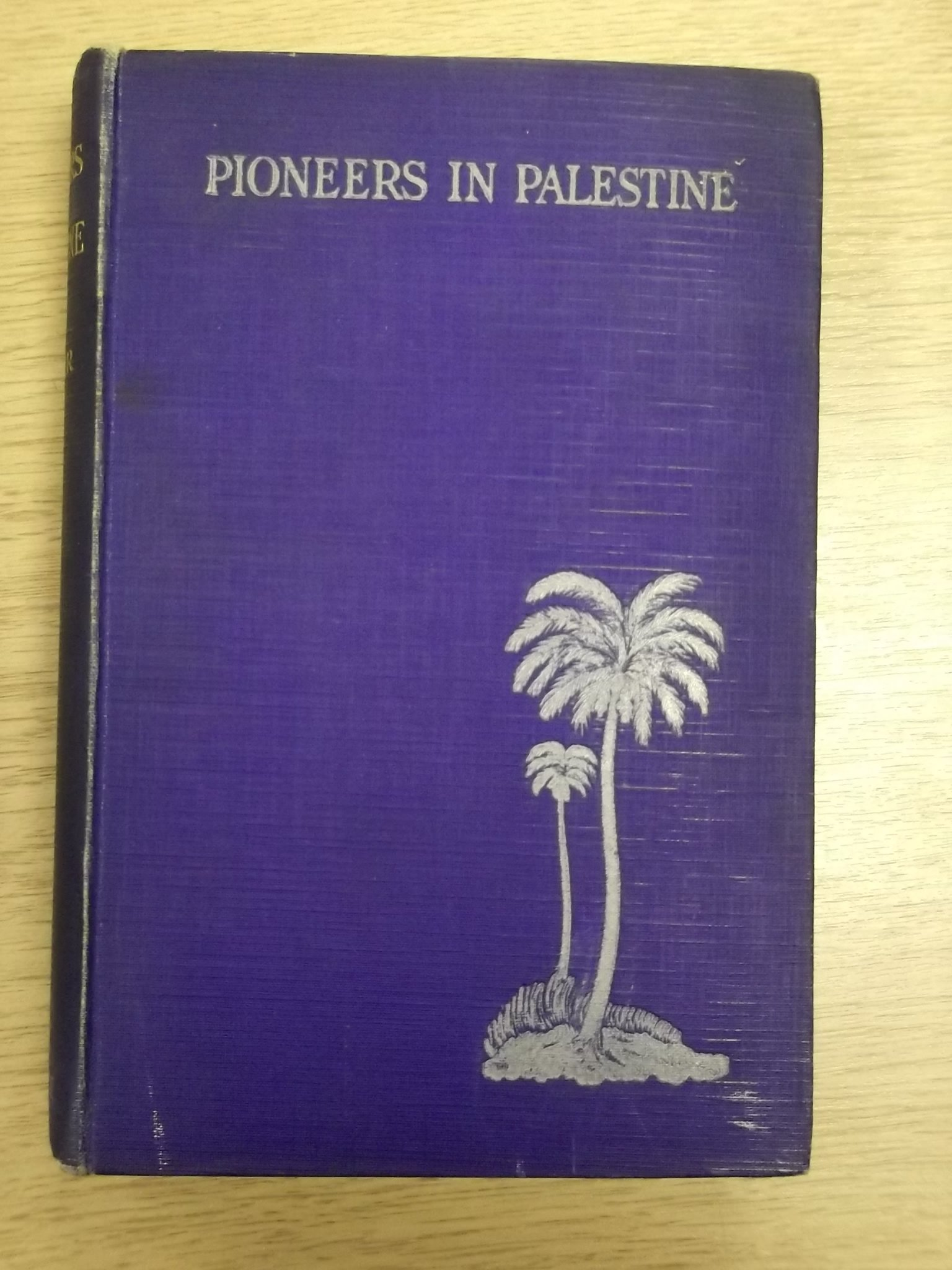
Pioneers in Palestine by Hannah Barnett-Trager 1923

During World War I Trager helped to arrange care for Jewish refugees arriving in London with severe illnesses. In 1917 she founded the Jewish Free Reading Room, despite advice that such a venture could not succeed: it did, and served the Jews of East London for many years.

She published four books: three volumes of stories for children and a memoir Pioneers in Palestine: Stories of one of the first settlers in Petach Tikvah (1923). The children's stories were aimed at English-speaking Jewish children and have been described as "the first Palestinian Jewish children’s literature, recounting what it was to be a young girl or boy at the dawn of the national revival in the Holy Land".

Pioneers in Palestine is a memoir covering the foundation of the city of Petah Tikva, and other aspects of the period including a description of young women campaigning in 1886 for the right to vote.

== Publications ==
- Pioneers in Palestine: Stories of One of the First Settlers in Petach Tikvah. G. Routledge & sons. 1923. ISBN 978-0-88355-345-9.
- Festival Stories of Child Life in a Jewish Colony in Palestine. G. Routledge & sons. 1919. Reprinted 2010 by BiblioBazaar, ISBN 9781171866862
- Stories of Child Life in a Jewish Colony in Palestine. G. Routledge & sons. 1920. Reprinted 2013 by Hardpress, ISBN 9781313779715
- Pictures of Jewish Home-Life Fifty Years Ago. G. Routledge & sons. 1924. Reprinted 2015 by Create Space Independent Publishing, ISBN 9781505249224
