= Der Israelit =

German Jewish publication

- 1869 edition of Der Israelit
- Type: Weekly newspaper
- Founder(s): Marcus Lehmann
- Founded: 1860
- Language: German
- Ceased publication: November 3, 1938 (78 years)
- City: Mainz; Frankfurt
- Country: Germany
- Circulation: 4,050 (maximum circulation)

Der Israelit was a German Orthodox Jewish weekly newspaper that circulated from May 15, 1860, until November 3, 1938, when it was shut down by the Nazi party.

== History ==
The newspaper was initially founded in 1860 in Mainz by Orthodox rabbi Marcus Lehmann. In 1870, it was merged with Yeshurun, which had been established in 1854. Between 1871 and 1882, a Hebrew translation of it appeared in an appendix of Ha-Levanon, which at the time was independently published in Paris. Between 1873 and 1879, a concurrent edition circulated in Yiddish. Following Lehmann's death in 1890, his son, Oscar, inherited the position of editor. In 1906, the publication was moved from Mainz to Frankfurt. At the same time, Jacob Rosenheim purchased the newspaper and used it to promote World Agudath Israel's views on the path of Orthodox Jewry. In 1908, Jewish writer Selig Schachnowitz was appointed the new editor of the paper.

Starting in 1933, Der Israelit openly reported on Jewish persecution in Nazi Germany, and even reported on information about Concentration Camps in Nazi Germany, including Osthofen concentration camp. However, they were prevented from publishing anything that took a critical opinion of the said actions of the regime. Following the publication on November 3, 1938, the paper was shut down by force by the Nazi regime, who banned its distribution in its entirety.

== Contents ==
Der Israelit was considered "a major organ of Orthodox Judaism" in Germany, and took a traditional and more conservative religious approach, as opposed to the more Reform Jewish Allgemeine Zeitung des Judentums, whose denomination and social change it heavily criticized. Over time, the paper became one of the most widely circulated spokesmen in Orthodox Jewish journalism in Germany.

It featured serialized narrative historicals by Lehmann, designed to attract interest of youth, whilst promoting traditionalism of modern developments and changes to other branches of Judaism. The stories served as a historical mirror of the lives of Central European Jewry in the 19th century. They were collected and published between 1918 and 1976 in a ten-volume series, which has been printed in multiple editions. They were reworked in the 1990s by Rayzel Friedman and became popular among Ultra-Orthodox Jews when published in Hamodia.
