= Nahalat Shiv'a =

Neighborhood in Jerusalem

Coordinates: 31.780373°N 35.219266°E

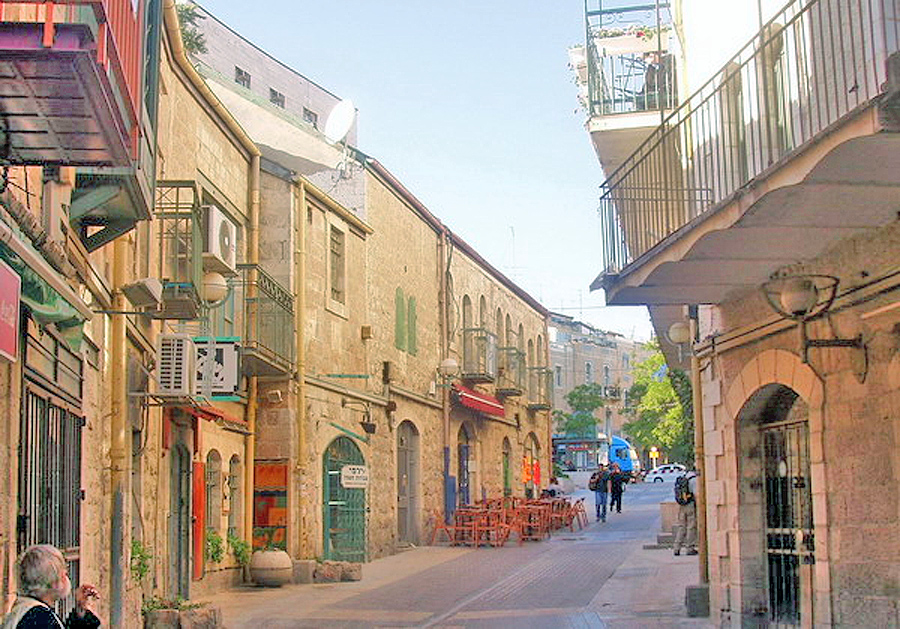
Rivlin Street, Nahalat Shiv'a

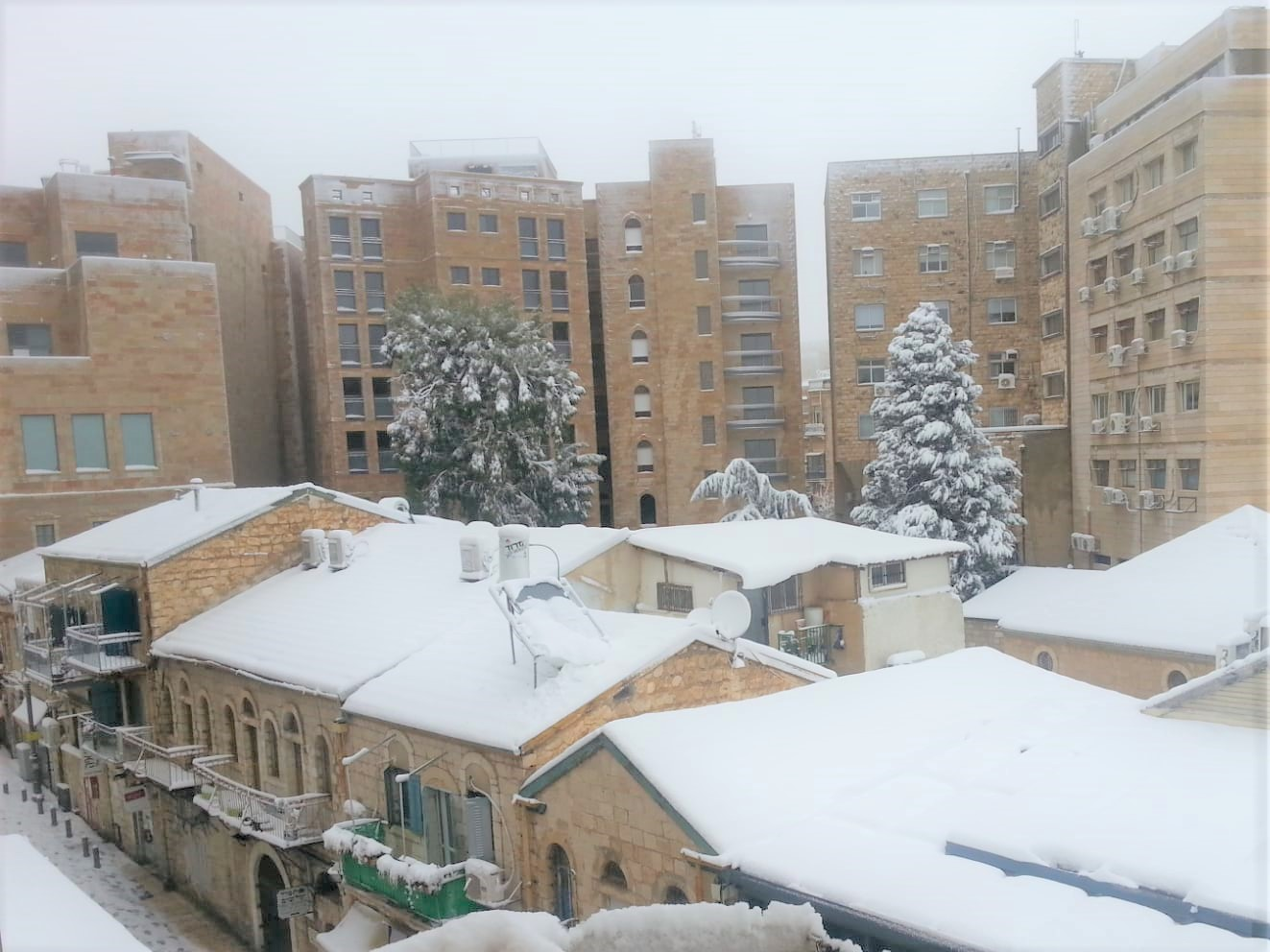
View of Joel Moshe Solomon Street in the snow, February 2015

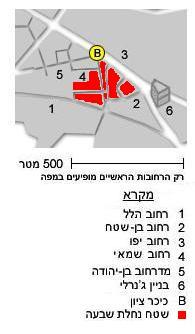
Map of Nachalat Shiv'a neighborhood: 1 Hillel Street, 2 Ben Sira St, 3 Jaffa St, 4 Shamai St, 5 Ben Yehuda St, 6 Generali Bldg at Zion Square

Nahalat Shiv'a (Hebrew: נחלת שבעה) is a former courtyard neighborhood in Jerusalem. It was the third Jewish neighborhood built outside the walls of the Old City of Jerusalem in the 1860s. Today it is a crowded pedestrian promenade lined with sidewalk cafes. It is adjacent to the Downtown Triangle of central Jerusalem.

== Name ==
Nahala is the Hebrew word for heritage or estate. Nahalat Shiv'a means "Estate [of the] Seven", referring to the seven founding families.

== History ==
Nahalat Shiv'a was the third residential neighborhood built outside the city walls. There are two stories regarding the purchase of the land. Yosef Rivlin claimed he raised the money on a trip to Russia in 1859, while Yoel Moshe Salomon claimed it was his idea. Lots were cast and Rivlin won the right to build the first house in the neighborhood. The other five founders were Yehoshua Yellin, Michal HaCohen, Binyamin Salant, Haim Halevi and Aryeh Leib Horowitz.

Upon his engagement in 1856, Rivlin announced his plan to settle outside the Old City walls, to the dismay of his family. After winning the right to build first, Rivlin chose a spot on the westernmost edge of Nahalat Shiva's northern boundary. After the first houses were built in 1869, none of the group dared spend the night in the newly built structures, due to the fear of leaving the perceived safety of the Old City. When Rivlin finally did, his family waited at Jaffa Gate each morning to be sure he had survived.

Yoel Moshe Salomon moved his printing press to Nahalat Shiva and ran the business with Michal HaCohen. His first publication was a guidebook. The following year, the press published the country's first Hebrew newspaper, Ha-Levanon. In 1873, milk cows were imported from Amsterdam and a dairy was opened in Nahalat Shiv'a. A carriage service to Jaffa Gate was inaugurated that summer.

By 1875 there were 50 families in Nahalat Shiv'a. In 1918, there were 861 people in Nahalat Shiv'a living and 253 houses.

The Safrai Gallery was founded in Nahalat Shiv'a in 1935.

On October 9, 1994, Hamas carried out a shooting spree in Nahalat Shiv'a, using two Palestinian Authority policemen defectors. Two people were killed and 16 wounded. Ma'ayan Levy, 19, and Samir Mugrabi, 35, were killed in the attack.

== Cultural landmarks ==
The Friends of Zion Museum is located in Nachalat Shiv'a; it is built into a series of the neighborhood's historic stone houses.

== See also ==
- Expansion of Jerusalem in the 19th century
