= Battle of Ammunition Hill =

1967 battle of the Six-Day War

- Part of Six-Day War
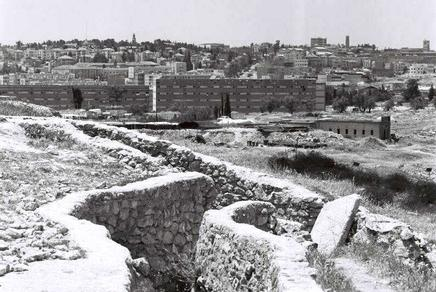
- Trenches on Ammunition Hill, 1967, with the apartment buildings of the Shmuel HaNavi neighborhood in the background
Date	June 6, 1967
Location	31°47′58″N 35°13′41″E; Ammunition Hill, the western slope of Mount Scopus
Result	Israeli victory

Belligerents
Israel	Jordan

Commanders and leaders
(Israel) Mordechai Gur (Israel) Shlomo Yossi Yafe (Israel) Uzi Narkis	(Jordan) Hussein bin Talal; Zaid ibn Shaker

Strength
Reinforced company	About 150 soldiers

Casualties and losses
36 killed	71 killed

Ammunition Hill (Hebrew: גִּבְעַת הַתַּחְמֹשֶׁת, Giv'at HaTahmoshet) was a fortified Jordanian military post in the northern part of Jordanian-ruled East Jerusalem and the western slope of Mount Scopus. It was the site of one of the fiercest battles of the Six-Day War. Ammunition Hill is now a national memorial site.

== Historical background ==
Ammunition Hill was located west of a police academy, with a fortified trench connecting them. The site was built by the British during their Mandatory Palestine in the 1930s, and was used to store the police academy's ammunition. The Jordanian Arab Legion seized control of the hill during the 1948 Arab–Israeli War, severing the link between Mount Scopus and West Jerusalem. In the wake of the 1949 Armistice Agreements, parts of Mount Scopus remained an Israeli enclave in Jordanian-held territory, with the Jordanians blocking access to Hadassah Medical Center and the campus of the Hebrew University of Jerusalem on the hilltop.

The post consisted of tens of bunkers built along the three main trench systems surrounding the hill, with fortified gun emplacements covering each trench. The living quarters for the Jordanian defenders of the hill were in a large underground bunker. At the time of the Six-Day War, the post was defended by a reinforced Jordanian company of 150 soldiers of the El-Hussein regiment (number 2).

== The battle ==
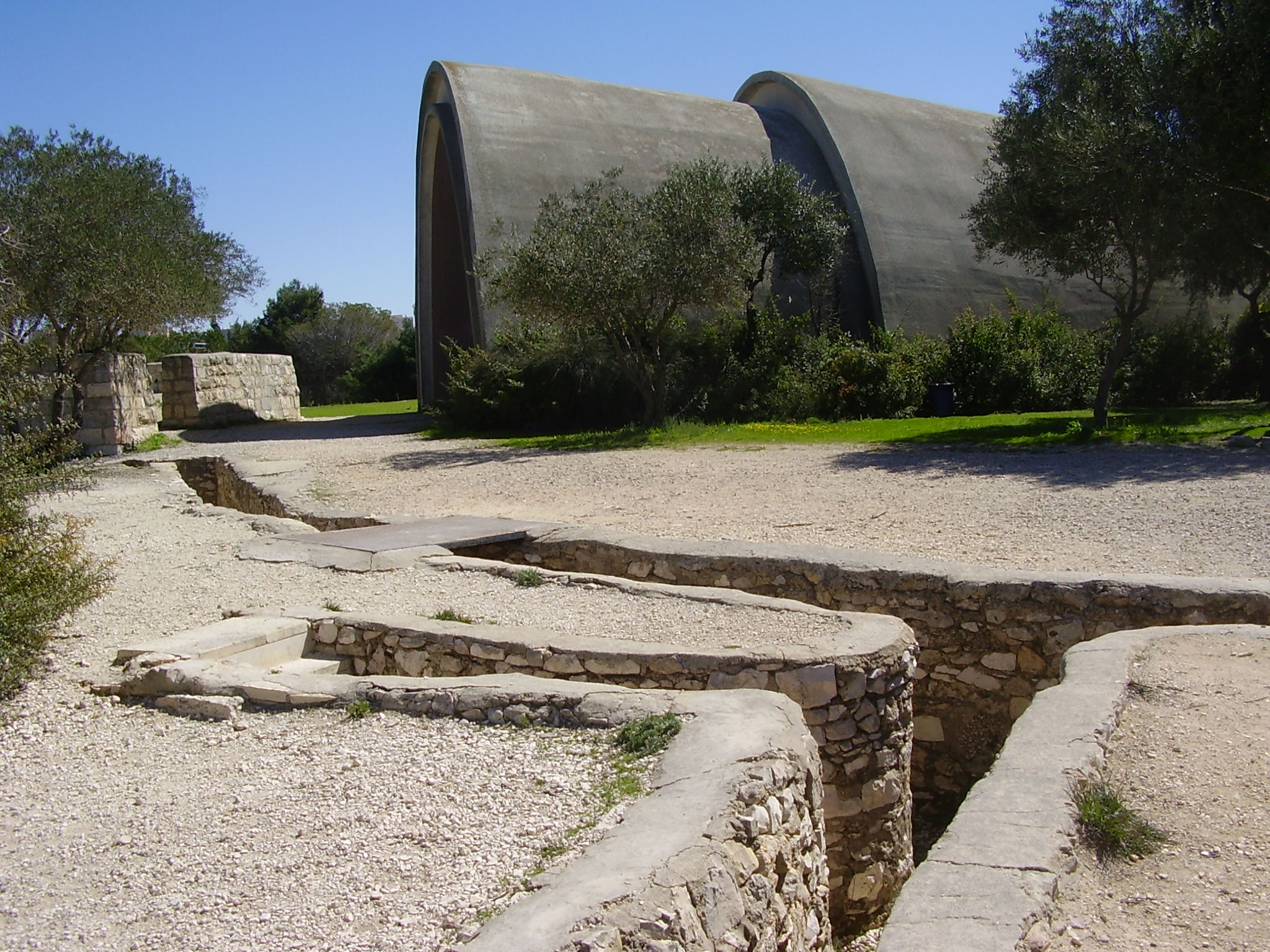
Bunkers and trenches on Ammunition Hill

A decision was taken by the Israeli Jerusalem Command, under General Uzi Narkis, to forgo an aerial attack on the hill due to its proximity to civilian areas. Instead an artillery barrage was to be focused on the police post, followed by a ground attack using an enlarged paratroop company.

The size of the Israeli assault force was based on incorrect intelligence, which detailed the hill as being defended by a single platoon. When the ground assault began, the police academy was discovered to be empty of Jordanian troops, as they had taken shelter from the barrage in the bunker system of the hill, thereby enlarging the force defending the hill to one equal in size to the assault force rather than 1/3 of its size, as had been anticipated by Israeli Central Command.

The fighting at the police academy and Ammunition Hill began on June 6, 1967, at 2:30 AM. The task of capturing the hill was given to the Israeli 3rd Company of the 66th Battalion, of the 55th Paratroopers Brigade, and during the battle, a force of the 2nd Company joined the fighting. The battle ended at 6:30 AM, although Israeli troops remained in the trenches due to sniper fire from Givat HaMivtar until the Harel Brigade overran that outpost in the afternoon. 36 Israeli soldiers and 71 Jordanians were killed in the fighting.

Ten of the soldiers who fought in this battle were given citations by the Israeli Chief of General Staff. The commander of the Paratroopers Brigade was Mordechai Gur. The commander of the 66th Battalion was Yossi Yafe.

== Memorial site ==
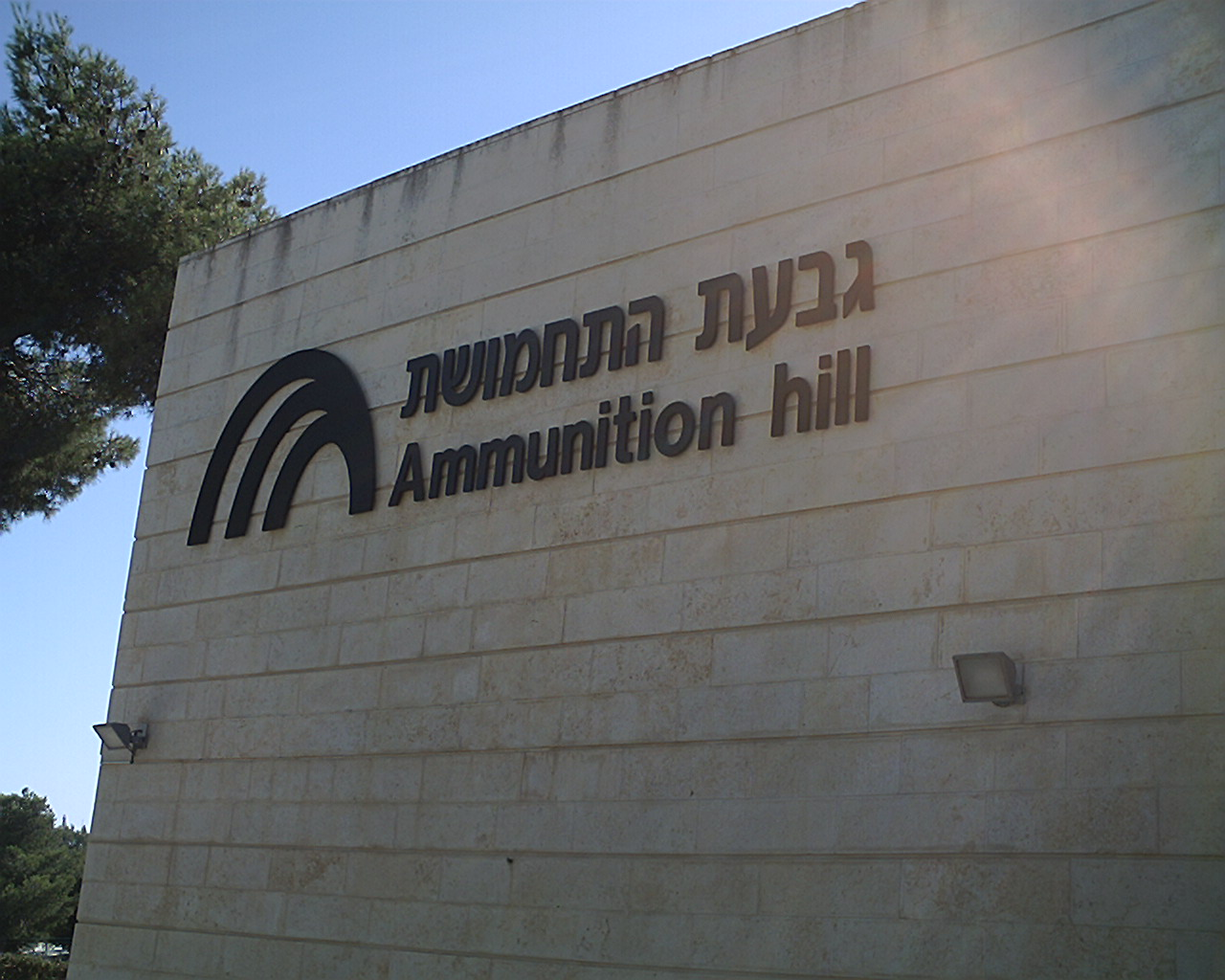
Sign for Ammunition Hill museum

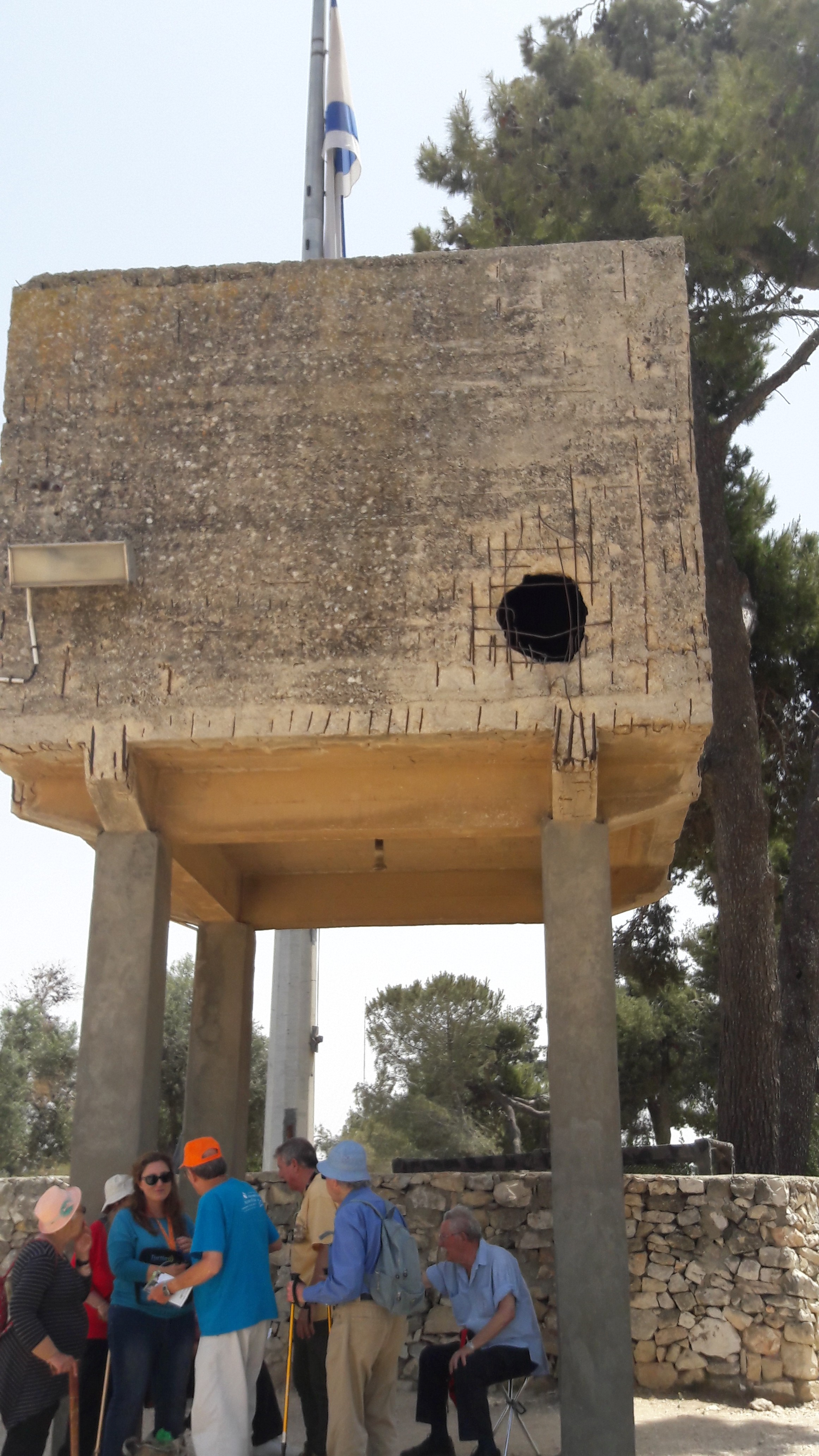
The water tower

In 1975, a memorial site and museum were inaugurated on the hill, preserving a part of the old post and opening a museum in the bunker. In addition, 182 olive trees were planted on the hill, commemorating the 182 Israeli soldiers who died in the battle for Jerusalem during the Six-Day War. In 1987, the site was declared a national memorial site. The main ceremony on Jerusalem Day is held here.

In April 2019, Israel honoured Lieutenant General J. F. R. Jacob of the Indian Army with a commemorative plaque on the Ammunition Hill Wall of Honour.

An estimated 200,000 visitors tour the site each year, including 80,000 soldiers. Ammunition Hill is also the main induction center for IDF paratroopers.

== In popular culture ==
In October 1967, several veterans of the battle were interviewed in the IDF magazine Bamahane. These interviews formed part of the basis for the lyrics of Yoram Taharlev's song Ammunition Hill (Hebrew: גבעת התחמושת, romanized: Givat Hatachmoshet), which was performed by the Central Command Band.
