= Ammunition Hill (song) =

"גבעת התחמושת"

Song by Central Command Band

from the album Where's the Merkaz?
- Language: Hebrew
- English title: Ammunition Hill
- Released: 1967
- Length: 5:43
- Label: Hed Arzi Music
- Composer: Yair Rosenblum
- Lyricist: Yoram Taharlev

"Ammunition Hill" is a 1967 Israeli song commemorating the Battle of Ammunition Hill in East Jerusalem during the Six-Day War. The lyrics were written by Yoram Taharlev, with music composed by Yair Rosenblum. It was performed by the Central Command Band as part of their program "Where is the Center?" The song was released several months after the end of the war and has since become a notable part of Israeli musical and cultural heritage.

== Background ==
The song was commissioned from lyricist Yoram Taharlev by Dani Litai, who was then responsible for the Central Command Band. Litai requested a song focused on the Paratroopers Brigade. Taharlev was inspired to write the lyrics after reading an article in the military publication BaMahane, in which journalist Yosef Argaman interviewed several soldiers who had participated in the battle. Taharlev incorporated several direct quotations from the article between the song’s verses. These monologues, recited by Hilik Tzadok, Gideon Amir, and Koby Recht, present first-person accounts of the battle from the perspective of Israel Defense Forces soldiers.

It was the dawn of the second day of the war in Jerusalem, the horizon paled in the east. We were in the midst of the Battle of Ammunition Hill. We fought there for about three hours.

— Ammunition Hill, opening lines of the song

The final section of the song features a statement by soldier Shalom David: "I don't know why I received a medal, I just wanted to get home safely". This line has been widely cited in Israeli media and cultural contexts, often beyond its original military setting. Taharlev later remarked:

"I think the song drew its power from these interviews, much more than from the text I wrote."

== Structure, melody and melodic references ==
The song is structured in multiple stanzas interspersed with monologues from soldiers describing the battle. Each stanza consists of four lines: three lines that rhyme, followed by a concluding line that ends with the phrase "Ammunition Hill".

The song's reception has been attributed in part to the combination of its lyrical structure and the distinctive melody composed by Yair Rosenblum. Unlike the slower, more harmonious melodies typical of earlier military ensemble songs and Israeli lyrical poetry, "Ammunition Hill" was composed in six-quarter time and performed at a rapid tempo. Researcher Eli Eshed noted:

"Rosenblum managed to combine the lyrics with the special rhythmic melody that does not swallow the text as happens with many hymns in which the music completely swallows the words, especially the complicated and intricate ones. But it seems that if you hear 'Ammunition Hill' even just once a year, the words remain forever remembered."

According to Taharlev, the internal poetic rhythm of the lyrics was influenced by lines from Haim Hefer’s poem Krav Harel, (Note: Interview by Geula Even with Yoram Taharlev on the program "Hamosaf", Channel One, September 19, 2012) which in turn drew inspiration from the "Civil War Trilogy," an American anti-war protest song series from the early 1950s. These earlier works were structured as popular hymns with canonical status, combining lyrical content with a rhythmic form intended to immerse listeners in the experience of battle. The stylistic approach used in "Ammunition Hill" would go on to influence other collaborations between Taharlev and Rosenblum.

== Meaning ==
The song is structured to present a detailed, documentary-style monologue through three voices, aiming to provide a realistic, report-like depiction of the events it describes. Rather than following a conventional song format, it consists of a spoken narrative accompanied by a rhythmic musical arrangement.

Although the song conveys a documentary impression, it functions as a stylized and structured portrayal of a heroic figure characteristic of the Six-Day War era. This portrayal is conveyed through speech—its rhythm, vocabulary, and the sense of resolution encapsulated in the well-known concluding line: "I don't know why I received the medal, all I wanted was to get home safely".

The piece exemplifies Israeli poetic works from the Six-Day War period that reflected broader cultural aims of education and moral guidance, particularly in shaping youth values. It is deliberately crafted to support these goals. The song also fits within the thematic framework of the era's "motherly" poems—such as What Will I Bless?—which often portrayed the soldier as a heroic figure departing for battle, supported emotionally and symbolically by a maternal figure. In this context, the "mother" is represented by the State of Israel and its people, reinforcing themes of collective identity and national belonging that were central to the cultural narrative of the time.

== Impact ==
The song holds a prominent place in Israeli cultural memory, and some commentators have suggested that it played a significant role in shaping the public perception of the Battle of Ammunition Hill. Over the years, certain military figures have argued that, despite the bravery demonstrated, the battle may not have been tactically essential. Former Chief of Staff Mordechai Gur, who oversaw the Israeli forces during the Israeli annexation of East Jerusalem, stated that the paratroopers’ traditional oath-taking ceremony would likely not have been held at Ammunition Hill were it not for the song’s vivid portrayal of the event.
