= Zerah Barnett =

Zionist pioneer

Zerach Barnett
- זרח ברנט
- Born: 16 April 1843; Kaunas, Lithuania
- Died: 15 October 1935 (aged 92); Tel Aviv, Mandatory Palestine
- Resting place: Mount of Olives, Jerusalem
- Occupation: Zionist pioneer
- Known for: Founding of Mea Shearim, Petah Tikva and Neve Shalom
- Notable work: Memoirs (co-written with daughter Hannah Barnett-Trager)
- Spouse: Rachel Leah HaCohen
- Children: 7

Zerach Barnett (Hebrew: זרח ברנט; born 16 April 1843 in Kaunas, Lithuania, died 15 October 1935 in Tel Aviv, Mandatory Palestine - today Israel) was a Zionist pioneer. He was one of the founders of Mea Shearim - one of the oldest Jewish neighborhoods in Jerusalem outside of the city walls, and later Petah Tikva - the first Jewish agricultural settlement. He founded Neve Shalom, the first Jewish neighbourhood of Jaffa, in 1890.

== Biography ==
Barnett was born in 1843 in Tzvitevyian - district of Kaunas (then Kovno), and studied at the Slabodka Yeshiva in the city. He married Rachel Leah HaCohen, the daughter of Itzchak HaCohen, a Lithuanian living in London, and moved to London after the marriage, where he became a fur garment manufacturer, wholesaler, retailer and Torah teacher. In 1871 after receiving his British citizenship, which would allow him to buy land in Israel, which was under Turkish Ottoman rule, he travelled with his family to Jerusalem intent on buying land and with others, pioneered the development of Mea Shearim - the first Jewish community outside the city walls. In the process he made loans to others to buy land and build homes but many of these were not repaid in a timely manner. He returned to London to work and increase his wealth, before returning to Jerusalem. In 1877 he co-founded Petah Tikva along with Yoel Moshe Salomon. Rachel Leah his wife refused to join him there due to the harsh conditions, which included living in a tent surrounded by ever-present malaria. She asked for arbitration by the Ashkenazi Chief Rabbi of Jerusalem, Shmuel Salant, who having heard both sides, advised her that as a good Jewish wife, she must follow her husband.

During his residence in Jerusalem, Petah Tikva and Neve Shalom, Barnett traveled to London fifteen times in order to raise personal funds. On two occasions 1884 and 1885, in Paris, he met with Baron Edmond James de Rothschild to request financial support for Petah Tikva's survival as a Jewish agricultural community. During the same period he attended the Katowice Conference of European Jewish community leaders to appeal for funds for Petah Tikva.

The mud and brick buildings of the pioneers of Petah Tikva were not sturdy enough for the wet winters, and they washed away. After contracting malaria, Barnett returned to London for five years to increase his wealth and returned in 1885 to build the first two-storey stone building in the settlement and buy more farm land. This structure also served as the community's synagogue and later, the house served as a fort during the defense of Petah Tikva against Arab raiders.

In 1890, whilst maintaining his Petah Tikva lands Barnett bought land north of Jaffa, where he intended to found the first new Jewish urban community which he called Neve Shalom. The Head of Jaffa's Beit Din, Rav Naftali Hertz HaLevi and other prominent Jewish residents from Jaffa settled there. Naftali Hertz Halevi. In 1896, Barnett donated some of the land to an educational-religious organization to be known as Shar'ei Torah, and also founded a Yeshiva named the Or Zore'ah Yeshiva. Neve Shalom grew and prospered as a Jewish urban community and by the time of World War I was the largest such community in Israel.

With the outbreak of World War I Barnett and his family were evacuated to Alexandria, Egypt, as British citizens, where they remained until 1918 when they returned to their home in Neve Shalom, had which continued to grow in their absence with some 3,800 Jewish and Arab families (moslem and christian) living side-by-side. The arabs called Neve Shalom - Manshia, which loosely translated means outside the walls (of Jaffa).

At the turn of the century Barnett invested in substantial lands to the north-east adjoining Neve Shalom to be called Ahuzat Bait and later Tel Aviv which was established in 1909.

Barnett's memoirs were written with the help of his daughter, the author Hannah Barnett-Trager in 1929, in Hebrew and published by Yehuda Halevi Schechter. These were re-published in both Hebrew and English in 2021 by Michael Barnett to accompany a documentary film about Zerach Barnett on the 150th anniversary of his first arrival in Israel in 1871.

Barnett's wife, Rachel Leah (1844) died in 1924 having given birth to 7 children. Barnett died in 1935 in Neve Shalom, by then a suburb of Tel Aviv. Both are buried side-by-side at the Mount of Olives, Jerusalem.

Barnett is mentioned as one of the five riders in The Ballad of Yoel Moshe Salomon on the topic of the founding of Petah Tikva.
