= Michal HaCohen =

Hebrew newspaper publisher and co-founder of towns

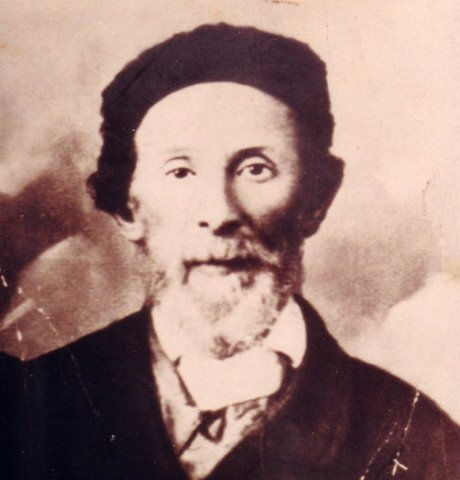
- Born: 1834; Lithuania
- Died: September 15, 1914 (aged 79–80); Mount of Olives Jewish Cemetery
- Other name: Yitzhak Eliyahu Michal HaCohen
- Occupations: publisher; journalist
- Known for: Co-founding Nahalat Shiv'a

Yitzhak Eliyahu Michal HaCohen (also known as Michael HaCohen) was a publisher and a journalist. He was one of the co-founders of Nahalat Shiv'a, one of the first Jewish neighborhoods built outside the walls of the Old City of Jerusalem, and of HaLevanon, the first Hebrew language newspaper established in Jerusalem and published in Palestine.

== Early life ==
Michal HaCohen was born in Yasvin, Lithuania, in 1834, son of Badana and Rabbi Eliezer HaCohen, rabbi of the town's Jewish community. His grandfather was a rabbi, Rabbi Israel HaCohen as was his great-grandfather, Rabbi Michal of Datanva. In the winter of 1884, he, his parents and three sisters started their journey by sailing ship to immigrate to the Land of Israel. Prior to leaving, his father Rabbi Eliezer made efforts to learn a craft from which he wanted to earn a living. After nine months they arrived in Jerusalem, where his father rented a shop on Yehudi Street in the Old City and began work repairing shoes. Much to his dismay, the rabbis of the community demanded Eliezer stop working in his shop and continue pursuing his life as a great rabbi and Torah scholar. He died soon after. An orphan, Michal was raised in the home a relative, Rabbi Shabtai Halevi and studied with Rabbi Shmuel Muni Zilberman, Rabbi Shmuel Salant and Rabbi Meir Aurbach. He then spent time in Europe studying the Torah.

== Career ==
=== Publishing ===
Towards the end of his stay in Europe, while in Germany, HaCohen and his friend Yoel Moshe Salomon decided to study the printing trade in Königsberg in Prussia. After acquiring the necessary equipment, they returned to Jerusalem in 1862 and opened a printing house in Jerusalem. It was the second one Hebrew printing house in Jerusalem, housing the first Hebrew printing house in the city founded by Yisrael Bak. The operation produced the first lithograph fabricated in Palestine, known as the shoshanta. While folded, it resembled a red rose. When it was opened, artistic depictions of Jerusalem's Gates and the Western Wall were revealed.

On 20 February 1863, the partners founded there, along with Yehiel Bril, HaLevanon, the first Hebrew language newspaper printed in Palestine. After the Ottoman authorities shut it down after only 12 issues. Bril continued to publish the paper in Paris for another 14 years. HaCohen and Salomon fled together with the printing press to Alexandria. After a plague broke out in Alexandria, HaCohen returned to Israel and sold his share in the printing house to his partner Yoel Moshe Salomon.

=== Founding of Nahalat Shiv’a ===
In 1866, a cholera epidemic impacted the overcrowded neighbourhoods inside the Old City's walls, decimating much of the population. Recognising that the residents of Mishkenot Sha'ananim, the first new neighbourhood in West Jerusalem, were largely unaffected by this calamity, HaCohen, six other Jerusalem community leaders decided that the time had come to expand the city outside of its walls. In 1869, they founded a new neighbourhood just outside Jaffa Gate, which they named Nahalat Shiv'a (lit. 'Heritage of Seven'). In 1869, HaCohen was also chosen to be one of the representatives of the Jews to welcome Franz Joseph I of Austria Emperor Franz Joseph on his trip to Jerusalem. As a token of appreciation for this meeting, the emperor sent him a new printing press, which he used to print The Hariel, a Hebrew daily newspaper that was printed and published in Jerusalem between the years 1874-1877 and that he was the editor of. Starting in 1893, together with his son-in-law, Haim Michal Michalin he engaged in fundraising for the Misgav Ladach Hospital.

== Legacy ==
Mikhal Ha-Kohen Square, a square in the Nahalat Shiv'a neighbourhood is named after Michal HaCohen.

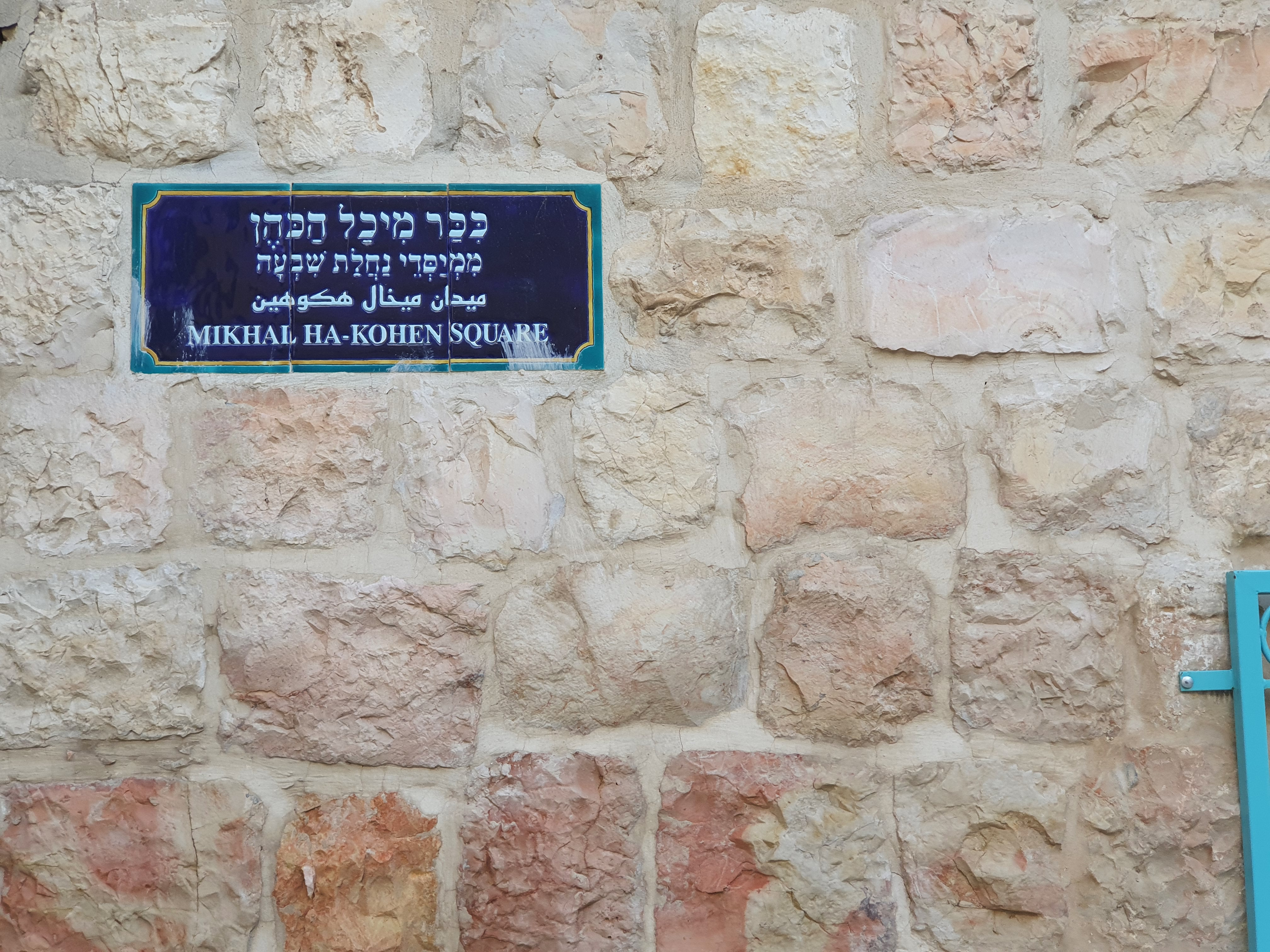
A square sign named after Michal Hacohen in Jerusalem

== Personal life ==
HaCohen married Liva Deborah, née Katzurin and had two sons and two daughters together: Eliyahu Eliezer Shaul Cohen (Dr. Elias Cohen), a physician in the colonies in the Galilee and Safed and later in Petah Tikva, Badana, wife of Haim Michal Michlin; Minna HaCohen Papo, and Israel Cohen. HaCohen is the great-grandfather of Lee Seeman.

== Sources ==
Hassan, Hassan Ahmad; al-Kayyali, Abdul-Hameed (13 August 2018). "Chapter 16: Ben-Yehuda in his Ottoman Milieu". In Dalachanis, Angelos; Lemire, Vincent (eds.). Ordinary Jerusalem, 1840-1940: Opening New Archives, Revisiting a Global City. Brill Publishers. pp. 330–351. ISBN 978-90-04-37574-1.
