= Selig Schachnowitz =

Swiss-Jewish writer (1874–1952)

- Born: May 27, 1874 Jurbarkas, Vilna Governorate, Russian Empire
- Died: January 23, 1952 (aged 77) Zürich, Switzerland
- Occupation: Writer
- Spouse: Zessi Löb
- Children: 1

Selig Schachnowitz (May 27, 1874 – January 23, 1952) was a Russian-born Swiss-Jewish writer and publicist.

== Biography ==
Schachnowitz was born in 1874 in Russian-controlled Lithuania under the Vilna Governorate to Isaak Schachnowitz and Lea Riszmann. He had a brother, Pinchas, who was also a writer but remained in Russia. He was trained as a teacher in Lithuania and received additional education in Frankfurt. From 1901 to 1908, he worked as a cantor at the synagogue in Endingen, Switzerland. During a trip to Baden, Switzerland, he presented his first work, Chayim Moshiach, to a hotelier for examination, and had found it printed the next week in the Mainz Israelite.

In 1908, he started as an editor at Der Israelit magazine in Frankfurt, where he also worked as a teacher at Solomon Breuer's yeshiva. He married Zessi Löb, and they had one daughter, Gertrud (1910–2007). After visiting Eretz Yisrael, he wrote Zwischen Ruinen und Aufbau in Erez-Israel in 1931. He emigrated to Switzerland in 1938 after Der Israelit closed due to sanctions by the Nazi Party.

== Selected works ==
- Schachnowitz, Selig (1911). Skizzen aus Litthauen (in German). Jüdischer Volksschriftenverlag.
- Schachnowitz, Selig (1912). Luftmenschen: Roman aus der Gegenwart (in German). Frankfurt: Verlag des "Israelit".
- Schachnowitz, Selig (1922). בממלכת כוזר היהודית: רומן הסטורי (in Hebrew). אמנות.
- Schachnowitz, Selig (1923). Salomo der Falascha: eine Geschichte aus der Gegenwart (in German). Frankfurt: I. Kauffmann.
- Schachnowitz, Selig (1936). דאס בלימל פון גליק (in Yiddish). farlag "Grininḳe beymelekh".
