= United States Air Forces Central Command Band =

American military band

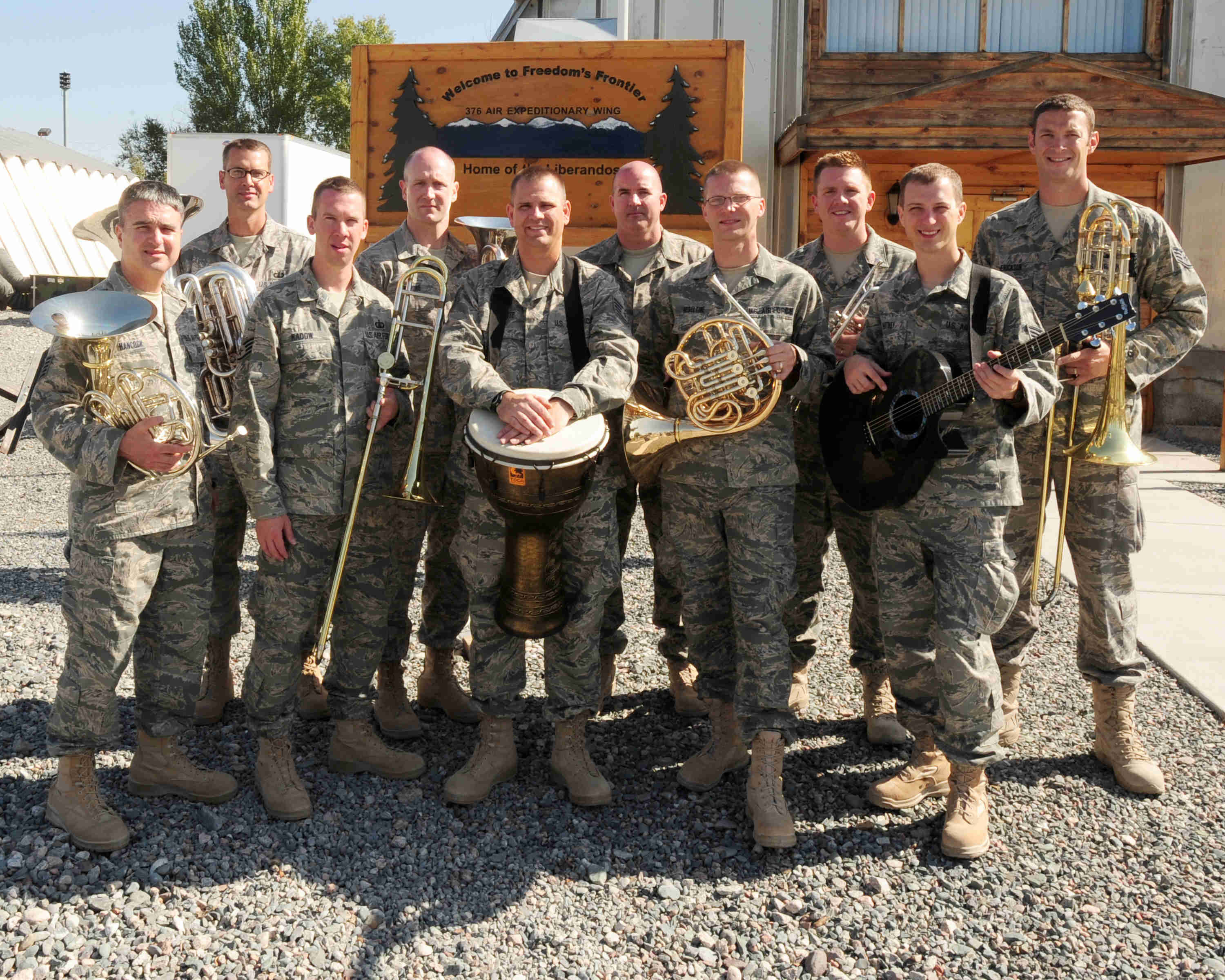
Members of band in Kyrgyzstan

The United States Air Forces Central Command Band also known as the AFCENT Band or Blue Steel is an Air Force military band. It is based at Al Udeid Air Base in Doha, Qatar. Being a contemporary musical group, its repertoire ranges from genres like pop to country music and rock-n-roll. It is composed of active duty airmen as well as reservist and Air National Guardsmen. It is the only deployed musical unit of the USAF. It provides music for official functions, and community relations. These include embassy ceremonies and public engagement with the people of the country in which it is visiting. Its primary area of responsibility consists of the countries in Middle East and Central Asia. It has performed in countries such as Djibouti, the United Arab Emirates, Kuwait and Kyrgyzstan.
