= Neve Shalom, Tel Aviv =

Historic neighborhood in Tel Aviv

Coordinates: 32.0613°N 34.7656°E

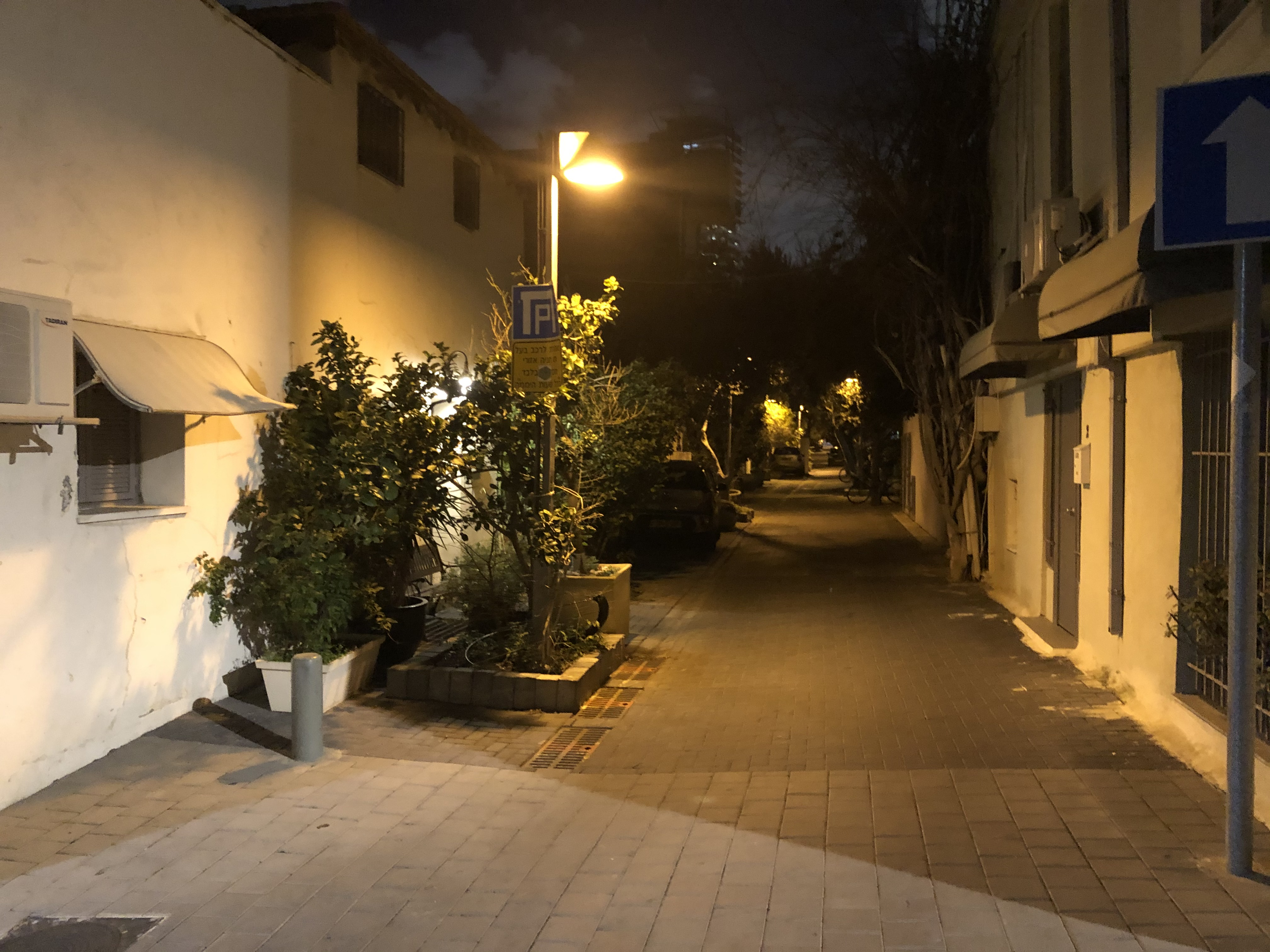

Neve Shalom (lit. Oasis of Peace) is an historic neighborhood in Tel Aviv, Israel. It was established in 1890 by Zerah Barnett outside the walls of Jaffa and named after Isaiah 32:18: "My people will live in a dwelling place of peace."

== History ==
Neve Shalom was the first purpose-built Jewish urban community outside the walls of Jaffa in 1890. It was located to the east of Manshiya and later incorporated it. Some 3,800 Jewish and Arab families lived there before the founding of Tel Aviv. The neighborhood was built of low-rise two storey buildings, some with internal courtyards and with red tiled roofs and decorative arched windows. The streets were narrow, with no clear separation between residential and commercial areas except for the synagogue, mikveh and covered bazar/market.

One of the first public institutions, built in 1895, on land donated by Zerah Barnett was Sha'arei Torah (lit. 'Gates of the Torah'), later the beit midrash of Rabbi Abraham Isaac Kook, which included a synagogue, a primary school, a high school and craft workshops. In addition to religious studies, the students learned carpentry and metalwork.

In 1905, Rabbi Kook's brother-in-law, Raphael Rabinowitz-Teomim, established a girls' school that became an important center of Hebrew culture and language-learning. In the wake of financial hardship and serious damage in 1948, the site was abandoned.

In the early 1990s Neve Shalom was saved from demolition by proactive preservation activists.
