= Marcus Lehmann =

German orthodox rabbi (1831–1890)

- Born: 29 December 1831; Verden, Hanover, Germany
- Died: 14 April 1890 (aged 58); Mainz, Grand Duchy of Hesse, Germany

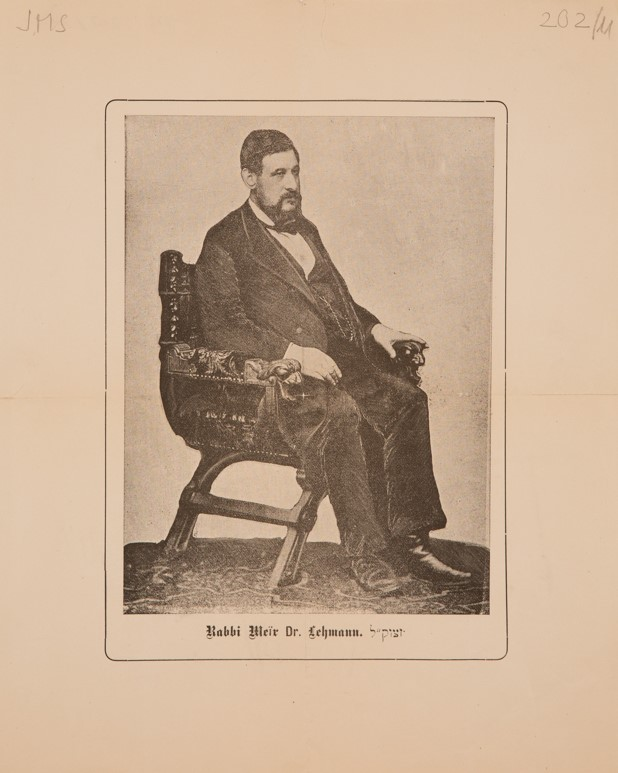
Late 19th century portrait of Rabbi Marcus Lehmann, in the collection of the Jewish Museum of Switzerland.

Marcus or Meyer Lehmann or Meir Lehmann (29 December 1831 – 14 April 1890) was a leading German Orthodox rabbi and author.

== Rabbinical career ==
After graduating from the gymnasium, Lehmann studied in Halberstadt under Rabbi Azriel Hildesheimer. He then went to Berlin University, and thence to Prague, to continue his theological and secular studies. He was graduated Ph.D. from the University of Halle.

In 1853 the congregation of Mainz, when building its new temple, provided for the introduction of an organ. Those of the members who were opposed to this innovation organized a Religionsgesellschaft (private religious society—it was illegal to form a new community until 1871), which in 1854 extended to Lehmann a call as rabbi and preacher. He accepted the position and remained with the congregation until his death.

In 1856 he dedicated a new synagogue, which the congregation owed mostly to his efforts (this was replaced in 1879), and he founded a religious school which in 1859 was developed into a Jewish school where both religious and secular studies were taught.

== Literary career ==
With the establishment of the Israelit, Lehmann attained a high position as one of the leaders of the movement for the maintenance of Orthodox Judaism in Germany. In 1860 Ludwig Philippson's Allgemeine Zeitung des Judenthums was practically the only Jewish periodical exerting a profound influence in extending the ideas of the Reform party. In May of that year the Israelit made its appearance, and from the outset it acquired a great reputation and wide circulation. In the course of time it absorbed the Jeschurun (the periodical edited by Rabbi Samson Raphael Hirsch) and assumed the title of Israelit und Jeschurun, which paper, after the death of Lehmann, was continued under the editorial care of his son Oskar Lehmann, who for a number of years had been a member of its staff.

Lehmann was known as a prolific writer of short stories, most of them being first published in his paper. They afterward appeared collectively as Vergangenheit und Gegenwart, 6 vols., Frankfort-on-the-Main, 1872–88. Lehmann wrote also many historical novels, including: Rabbi Josselmann of Rosheim, 2 vols., ib. 1879–80, The Royal Resident (a biography of his ancestor Rabbi Issachar Berend Lehmann), and Akiba (biography of Rabbi Akiva based on Talmudic and classical sources). Of his other writings may be mentioned: “Bustenai”; "Die Orgel in der Synagoge", Mayence, 1862; "Die Abschaffung des Kol Nidre, und Herr Dr. Aub in Mainz," Mayence, 1863; and "Der Talmud Jeruschalmi. Traktat Berakot. Text mit dem zum Ersten Male nach einer in Palästina Aufgefundenen Handschrift Herausgegebenem Commentare des R. I. Syrelei," ib. 1874 (along with his own commentary, Me-ir Nesiv). His great-grandson Osher Lehmann was very essential in furthering their publishing in America in the 1900s.

== Works ==
- Akiva
- The Family Y Aguilar
- The Adopted Princess
- Rabbi Yoselman of Rosheim
- Unpaid Ransom
- Out of the Depths
- Faith and Courage
- Portrait of Two Families
- Between Two Worlds
- Rabbenu Gershom Meor Hagolah
- Bustenai
- Royal Resident
- The Count of Coucy
- Ithamar
- Just In Time
- (1867) Rabbi Elchanan; The Kings Son-in-Law; The Abandoned
- (1869) Count or Jew
- (1870) Sowing and Reaping
- (1872) Suss Oppenheim
- (1876) Benjamin
- (1878) Esther Chiera
- (1880) A Century Ago; Two Sisters
- (1882) Parthenope; The Widow's Son; A Tale of the Reaction
- (1883) Vanished; Never Despair
- (1886) Nahemiah
