= Central Command Band (disambiguation) =

Central Command Band may refer to:

- Lehakat Pikud Merkaz, Israel
- United States Air Forces Central Command Band
- A former band of Australian Army Band Corps
