= Yoram Taharlev =

Israeli poet, lyricist and author (1938–2022)

- יורם טהרלב
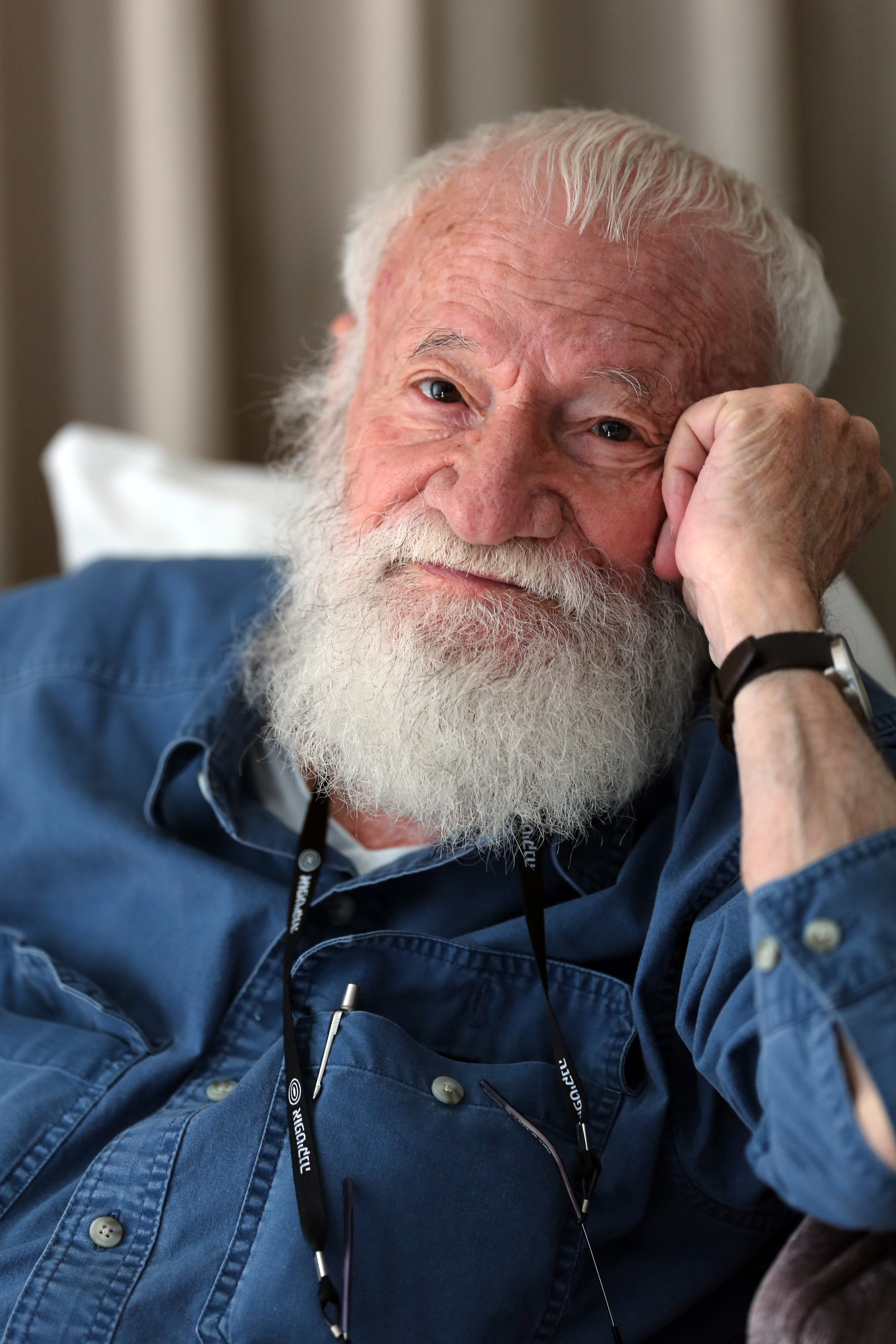
- Taharlev in 2016
- Born: 24 January 1938; Kibbutz Yagur, Mandatory Palestine
- Died: 6 January 2022 (aged 83); Tel Aviv, Israel
- Occupations: Poet lyricist author comedian

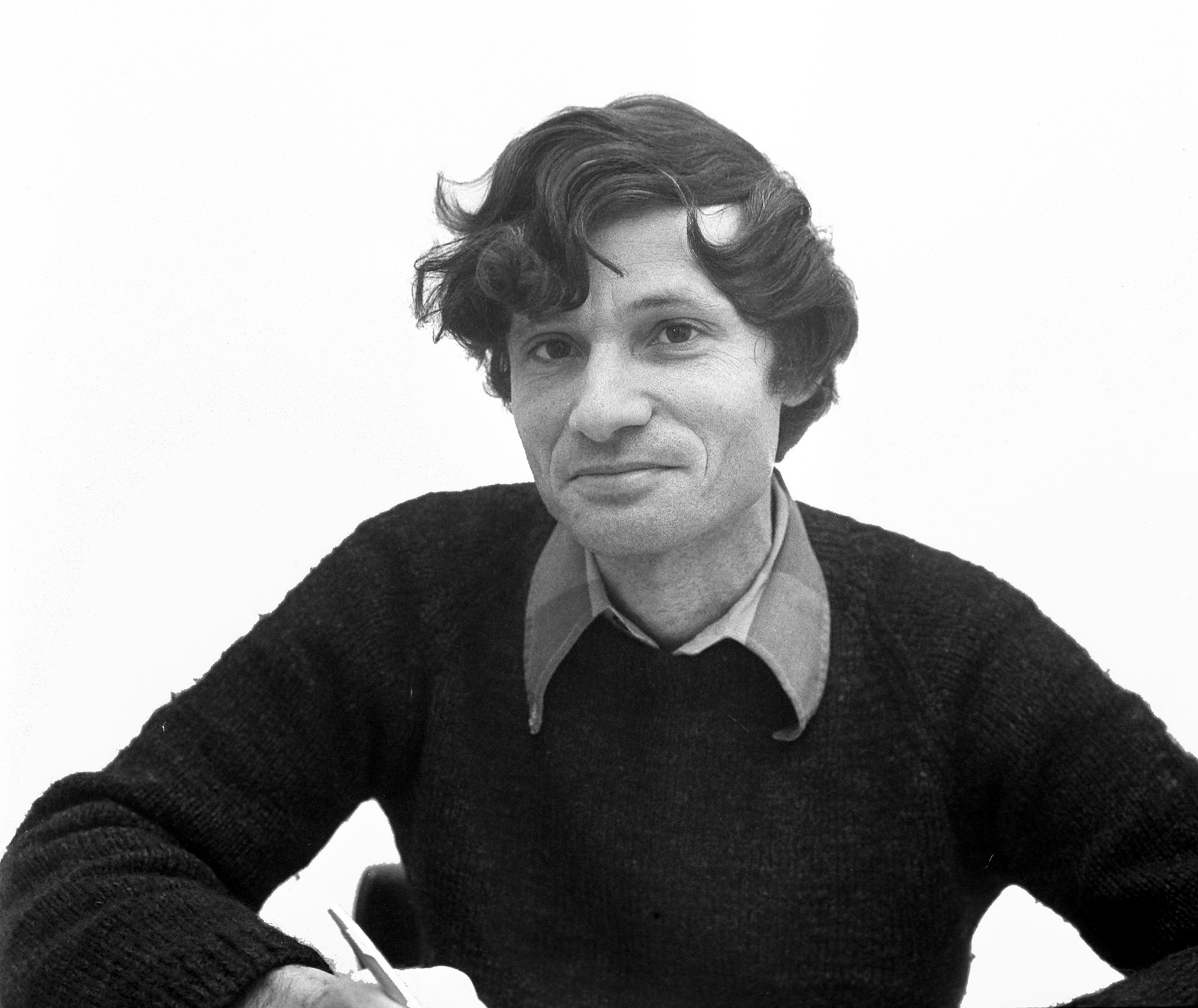
Yoram Taharlev, 1970

Yoram Taharlev (Hebrew: יורם טהרלב; 24 January 1938 – 6 January 2022) was an Israeli poet, lyricist, and author. He wrote lyrics for hundreds of songs recorded by prominent composers and performers.

== Biography ==
Yoram Taharlev was born on Kibbutz Yagur to Yaffa Yitzikovitz and the author and poet Haim Taharlev.

During his military service, he served as a reporter for the army newspapers Bamahane Gadna and Bamahane Nahal.

In 1963, Taharlev met poet Nurit Zarchi while they were philosophy majors at Tel Aviv University. In August 1963, they married. They had two daughters, artist Roni Taharlev and Arela. At the beginning, Taharlev and Zarchi lived in kibbutz Yagur, where their elder daughter Roni was born, but later moved to Petah Tikva and from there to Rishon LeZion and eventually to Tel Aviv. After thirteen years of marriage, they separated.

In 1978, Taharlev then married Linda, a United States citizen. Together they had a son, Daniel, and a daughter, Michal. Linda died in 2011.

In 2014 he married a third time, to Batia Keinan, an ex-spokesperson for President Ezer Weizman.

== Songwriting career ==
Taharlev mostly wrote for festivals and competitions, including the Israeli Song Festival and the Eurovision Song Contest. He published many poetry and song books. For many years he served as a publisher for the Israeli Ministry of Defense.

Taharlev wrote love songs, patriotic songs, songs about nature and about friendship and humorous songs. His song "Ammunition Hill" (Hebrew: גבעת התחמושת Givat Hatachmoshet) is among many that struck a chord with the public due to its authentic description of the battle at Jerusalem's Ammunition Hill during the Six-Day War. "Be My Friend, Be My Brother" (Hebrew: היֵה לי חבר היֵה לי אח Heye li Haver Heye li Ach) is about friendship and "The Ballad of Yoel Moshe Salomon" (Hebrew: הבלדה על יואל משה סלומון HaBalada Shel Yoel Salomon) sung by Arik Einstein, which starts off with the words "On a humid morning in 1878" (Hebrew: בבוקר לח בשנת תרל"ח BeVoker lach bi-shnat tarlach) is a description of an episode in Israeli history (the founding of the town of Petah Tikva).

The song "With His Hands He Will Bring" (Hebrew: על כפיו יביא Al Kapav Yavi), originally sung by Rivka Zohar, was written after an encounter with an unemployed carpenter, in a poor neighbourhood, who was sitting in his empty workshop with the hope of building a chair for the prophet Elijah who would come and redeem him from his troubles. His song "Hora" (Hebrew: הורה), sung by Avi Toledano, won second place at the Eurovision Song Contest in 1982.

Many of Taharlev's songs were written from his childhood experiences in kibbutz Yagur among which are "The Mountain That Is Always Green" (Hebrew: ההר הירוק תמיד HaHar HaYarok Tamid) written about Mount Carmel near Yagur, "Four in the Afternoon" (Hebrew: ארבע אחר הצהריים Arba Ahar HaTzhorhayim) about life in the kibbutz, "In The Grove Near The Trough" (Hebrew: בפרדס ליד השוקת Ba-pardes la-yad ha-shoket) written about the tree groves where he worked and to which he often went to be by himself, and "Shade and Water from the Well" (Hebrew: צלומי באר Tzel u-mei be'er), about an incident in 1945 during which a group of immigrants were brought to Yagur after their release from a detention camp in Atlit to hide from the British. In the song he wrote "He whose hut has fallen, let him enter through the door silently and stay forever."

His songs were composed by many Israeli composers among which are Moshe Vilenski, Nachum Heiman, Nurit Hirsh, Matti Caspi, Moni Amarillio, Shalom Hanoch and Efy Netzer. The first to compose with him was Nachum Heiman from Beit Alpha to whom Taharlev sent the lyrics of the song "You, Me and the Wind" (Hebrew: את ואני והרוח At Ve Ani Ve HaRuach). The song was performed by the singing group The Parvarim.

Taharlev had a special connection with composer Yair Rosenblum. Together they produced many hits for Israeli Army bands among which are "There Are Some Girls" (Hebrew: ישנן בנות Yeshnan Banot), "Be My Friend, Be My Brother" (Hebrew: היה לי חבר היה לי אח Heye li Haver Heye li Ach), "Ammunition Hill" (Hebrew: גבעת התחמושת Givat HaTachmoshet), "Song of the Paratrooper" (Hebrew: שירו של צנחן Shiro Shel Tzanhan) and "No Way Back" (Hebrew: אין כבר דרך חזרה Ein Kvar Derech Hazara). Many other songs written for the army bands were humorous songs such as "Ha-sakeh" (Hebrew: חסקה), "He Isn't So Smart" (Hebrew: הוא לא כל כך חכם Hu Lo Kol Kach Haham), "The Chaperone" (Hebrew: המלווה HaMelave), "Yiddishe Piraten" (Yiddish Pirates) and "Dying (To See Her Tonight)" (Hebrew: אני מת לראות אותה הלילה Ani met lirot ota ha-layla), patriotic songs such as "An Angel from Jacob's Ladder" (Hebrew: מלאך מסולם יעקב Malach MeSulam Yaacov), "All Your Wonders Have Not Ceased" (Hebrew: עוד לא תמו כל פלאייך Od Lo Tamu Kol Pla'ayich), "Get Up and Tour The Country" (Hebrew: קום והתהלך בארץ Kum Ve Hithalech BaAretz), "To the Nahal" (Hebrew: אל הנח"ל El HaNahal), "Accordion Player" (Hebrew: נגן אקורדיון "Nagan Accordion)", "Ben-Gurion" (Hebrew: בן-גוריון) and more. "Another collaboration of the two is "It Is Time" (Hebrew: זה הזמן Ze HaZman) which was sung by Nira Gal.

Many of his songs were composed in the pop and rock genres such as "You Can't" (Hebrew: אינך יכולה Einech Yechola) performed by The High Windows, "Ya'ale Ve-Yavo" performed by Gidi Gov and "Electricity Flows through Your Hands" (Hebrew: חשמל זורם בכפות ידייך Hashmal Zorem BeKapot Yadecha) sung by Ruti Navon. Among other performers of his songs are Yoram Gaon, Hava Alberstein, Yardena Arazi, The Yarkon Bridge Trio, The Parvarim, The Dudaim, Edna Lev, The Hamtzitzim, Ilanit, Boaz Sharabi, Ilana Rovina and Matti Caspi.

Taharlev wrote many children's songs for the Israeli Children Songs Festival such as "My Family" (Hebrew: המשפחה שלי HaMishpacha Sheli) for Shlomo Nitzan, "Barba'aba" (Barbapapa) and "Mr. Apchi" for Tzipi Shavit, "We Won't Stop" (Hebrew: לא נעצור Lo Naatzor) and "Come Back Romance" (Hebrew: שובי רומנטיקה Shuvi Romantica) sung by Yardena Arazi and "Donald Duck" by Mike Burstein. "The Way to the Village" (Hebrew: הדרך אל הכפר HaDerech El HaKfar) was written for Rivka Zohar based on her life from childhood until her return to Israel after a harsh drug ordeal in the United States. The song was composed by Nurit Hirsh for the Festigal in 1985 where it won first place. A year later, Taharlev and Hirsh wrote "Piece of Heaven (God's Plot of Earth)" (Hebrew: חלקת אלוהים Helkat Elohim) which was also performed by Zohar and won first place.

== Literary career ==
After writing hundreds of poems, Taharlev dedicated himself to reading and writing about traditional Jewish texts, saying, "I am reading the holy texts with secular eyes." He wrote several books, in which he reviewed and analyzed these traditional texts, labeling them as "a fresh and humoristic look at the holy and traditional Jewish books and texts."

His interpretations are highly regarded by both secular and religious communities. His book, Al Birkey Avot" (perush to 'Pirkey Avot') was among the biggest sellers in 2016. His book Simchat Tora is a humorous commentary of all the 'Torah portions of the week'.

"Taharlev has considerable success in bringing closer to the Jewish tradition those who draw back from everything that seems to be religious and traditional". Taharlev exposed them to the beauty and the brilliance of it. His slogan is "Learn with joy and smile"!He said, "If the religious and traditional books were taught to us in this way, with a smile, we could find out much more about our roots and we wouldn’t be so detached from them." Israeli Prize laureate Eliyahu Ha-Cohen said: "Although he was born on a kibbutz and was a major lyricist of the army bands and pop songs, Taharlev derives a lot of his motifs and inspiration from the Bible. He is the most 'Jewish' among the Israeli lyricists." The song "Go and Walk the Land" became the slogan of the Society for the Protection of Nature in Israel. "Be my friend, be my brother" is often sung at memorial ceremonies. "Ammunition Hill" is a standard performed at Independence Day Ceremonies, and the "Mountain That Is Always Green" (about Mount Carmel, where Taharlev was born) has become associated with the festival of Tu BiShevat (the fifteenth day of the Hebrew month of Shevat, which is known as the New Year of the Trees). This song is the most popular among Israeli children, though on such occasions the verse in which Taharlev describes bringing back a fallen comrade who, like him, was born there, is omitted.

== Awards and recognition ==
Taharlev was awarded a lifetime achievement award for Hebrew poetry by the president of Bar-Ilan University as one of the most potent lyricists of Hebrew poetry and that he is a meaningful contributor to the renewed culture of Israeli song.

In 2016, at the Haifa Children's Theatre Festival, "The First Kiss" (Hebrew: הנשיקה הראשונה HaNeshika HaRishona) based on Taharlev's earlier works, won first place in the youth category. Taharlev was also awarded a token of recognition by the Haifa Theatre Company.

== Death and legacy ==
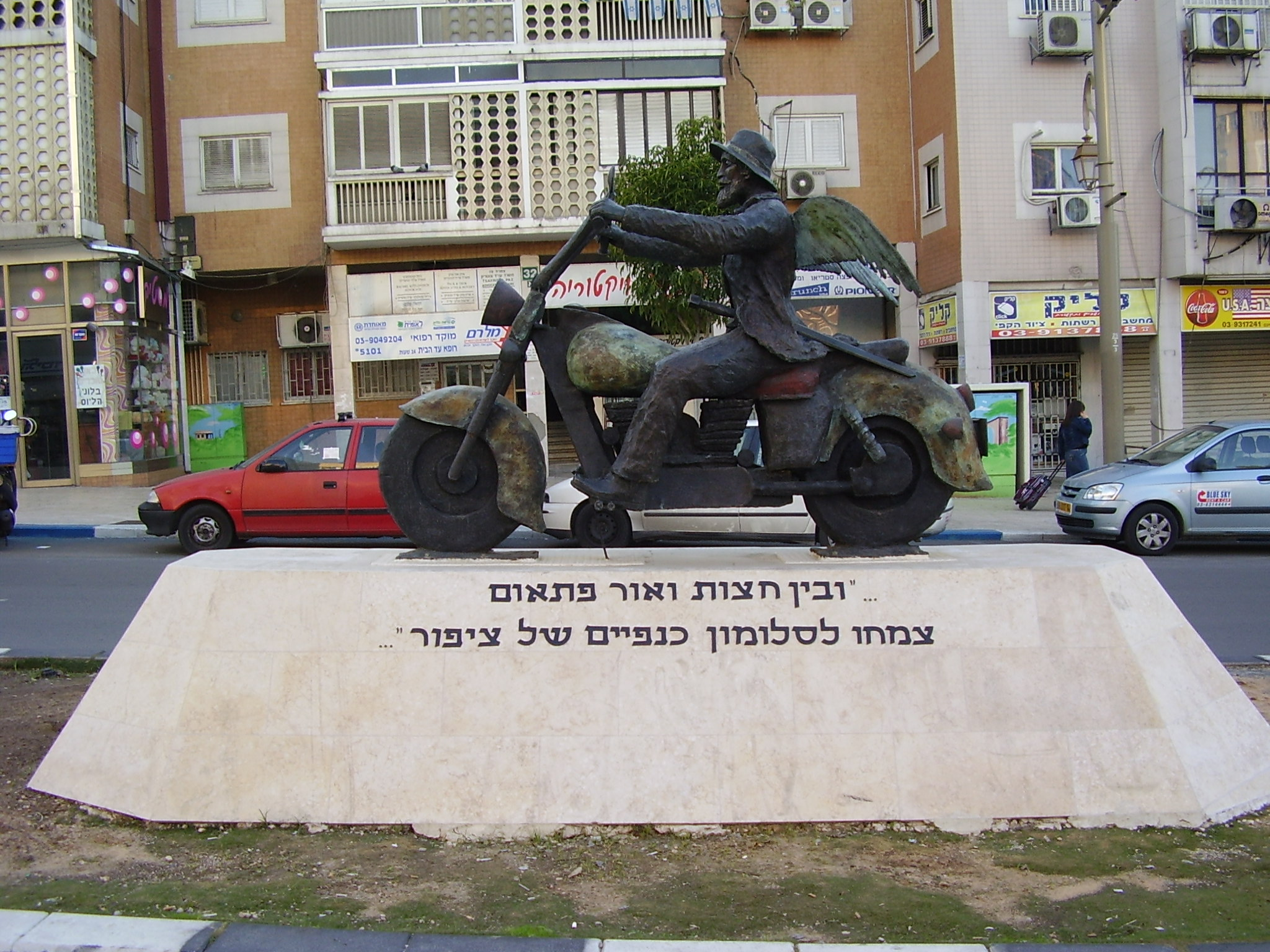
A statue in the town of Petah Tikva with lyrics from The Ballad of Yoel Moshe Salomon engraved on it

A public square was named in his honor in the town of Or Yehuda. His songs are engraved in monuments throughout Israel including Petah Tikva and Jerusalem.

Taharlev died on 6 January 2022, at the age of 83 after a battle with cancer.

Upon hearing of Taharlev's death, Israeli Prime Minister Naftali Bennett stated that “His songs have accompanied the country for years — in sadness and in joy, in times of war and peace. He passed away, but his work will remain with us forever. May his memory be a blessing.”

Israeli President Isaac Herzog, upon hearing about Taharlev's death, said "My heart aches with great pain with Taharlev's passing. The lyrics of his songs and writing will continue to illuminate our path and tell our story."

Israeli Defense Minister, Benny Gantz, said: “With an incredible combination of humor and seriousness, you shaped the soundtrack of the military, which has accompanied us soldiers for decades and still accompanies us and will continue to do so in the future.”

Israeli Transportation Minister Merav Michaeli, in a statement, said that Taharlev’s “soundtrack is a unique combination of the love of country and love of the [fellow] person, of romance and of pain and always with humor. This humanistic voice is needed in Israel more than ever today, and it will continue to accompany us, always.”

== Discography ==
- 2005 – Get Up and Tour the Country
- 2008 – No Way Back – 4-CD set
