= Yehoshua Stampfer =

Hungarian Zionist and founder of Petah Tikva

- יהושע שטַמפּפֶר
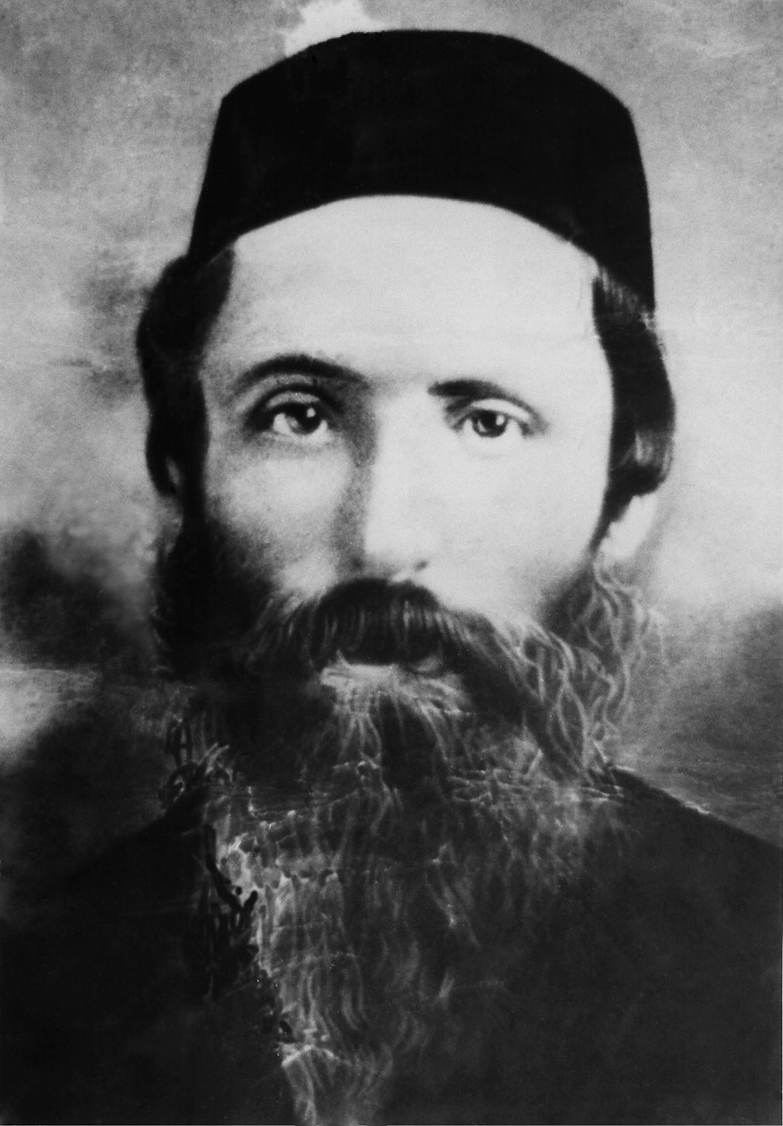
- Born: July 8, 1852; Komárno, Kingdom of Hungary
- Died: June 4, 1908 (aged 55)
- Burial place: Purple Cemetery, Petah Tikva
- Known for: co-founder of Petah Tikva
- Movement: Zionism

Yehoshua Stampfer (born 8 June 1852, Komárno – died 4 July 1908; Hebrew: יהושע שטַמפּפֶר) was one of the founders of the city of Petah Tikva in Israel. He was a member of its first municipal council.

== Biography ==
Yehoshua Stampfer was born in Komárno and raised in Szombathely, Hungary. Seeing the results of the national success of the Hungarians in 1867, Stampfer longed for a similar independence for his people in Eretz Yisrael. When he was 17, he immigrated to the Land of Israel. He later joined forces with other pioneers and established new Jewish neighborhoods outside the Old City of Jerusalem. Initially he purchased 3.2 km^{2} for Petah Tikva, which began with a few tents. In 1882 there were already 66 people living in Petah Tikva.

In 1898 he planted the second orchard in Petah Tikva (after the baron), there he preserved the balady citron that was selected by Rabbi Yehoshua Leib Diskin.

Yoshua's son Shlomo was later the first mayor of Petah Tikva and his son-in-law Pinhas Globman kept on with the orchards of his father, that he managed already in the years of the founder.

== See also ==
- The Ballad of Yoel Moshe Salomon
