= Aaron ben Eliezer =

Aaron ben Eliezer may refer to:

- Aaron ben Eliezer (rabbi)
- Aaron ben Eliezer (poet)
