= Ezrat Yisrael =

Neighborhood of Jerusalem, Israel

Coordinates: 31°47′02.60″N 35°13′03.90″E

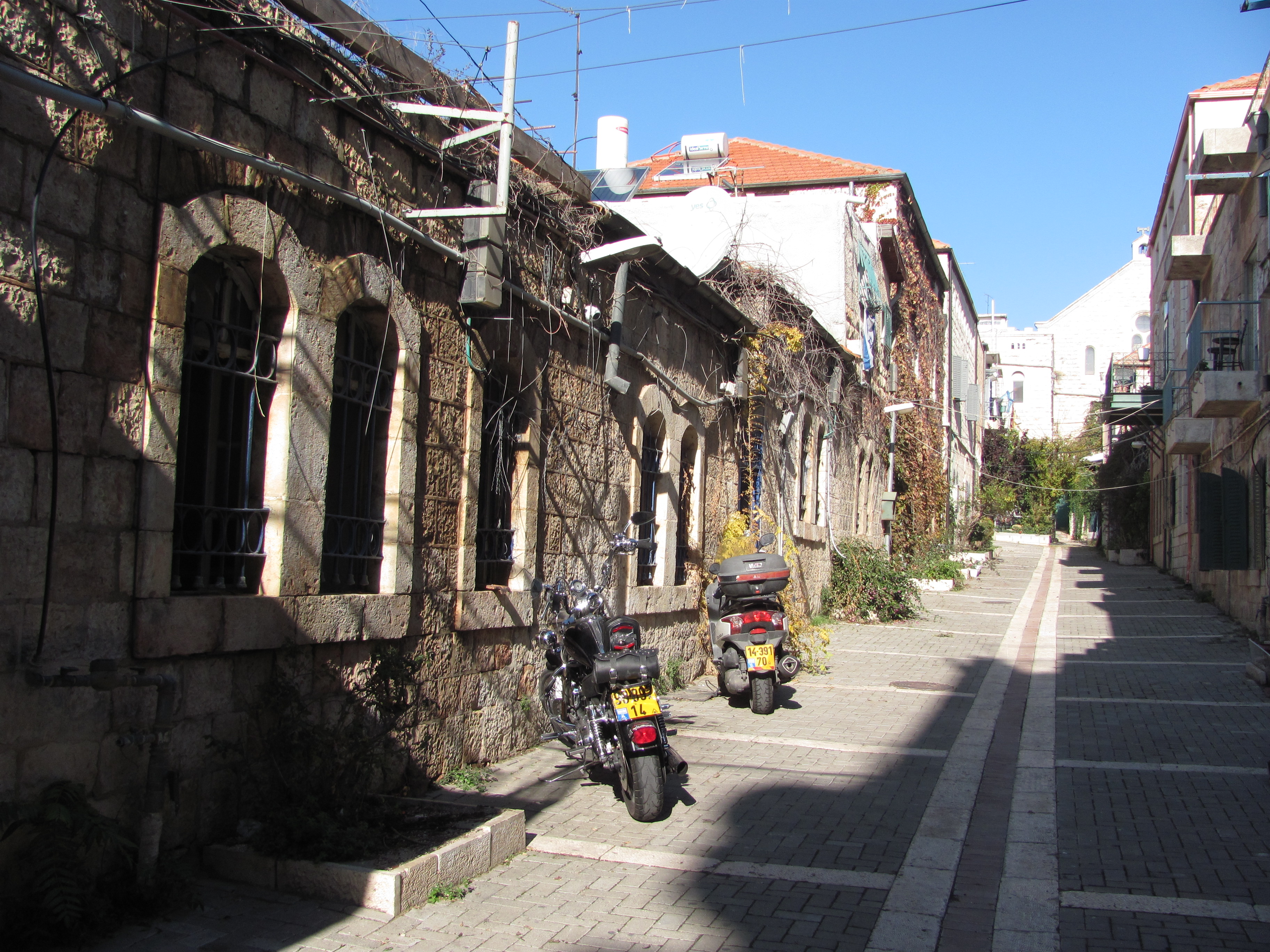
Historical buildings on Ezrat Yisrael Street

Ezrat Yisrael (Hebrew: עזרת ישראל, "Help of Israel") is a former courtyard neighborhood in Jerusalem. The neighborhood consisted of buildings on either side of a lane, today named Ezrat Yisrael Street. The street is blocked on one end and opens onto Jaffa Road on the other end.

== Name ==
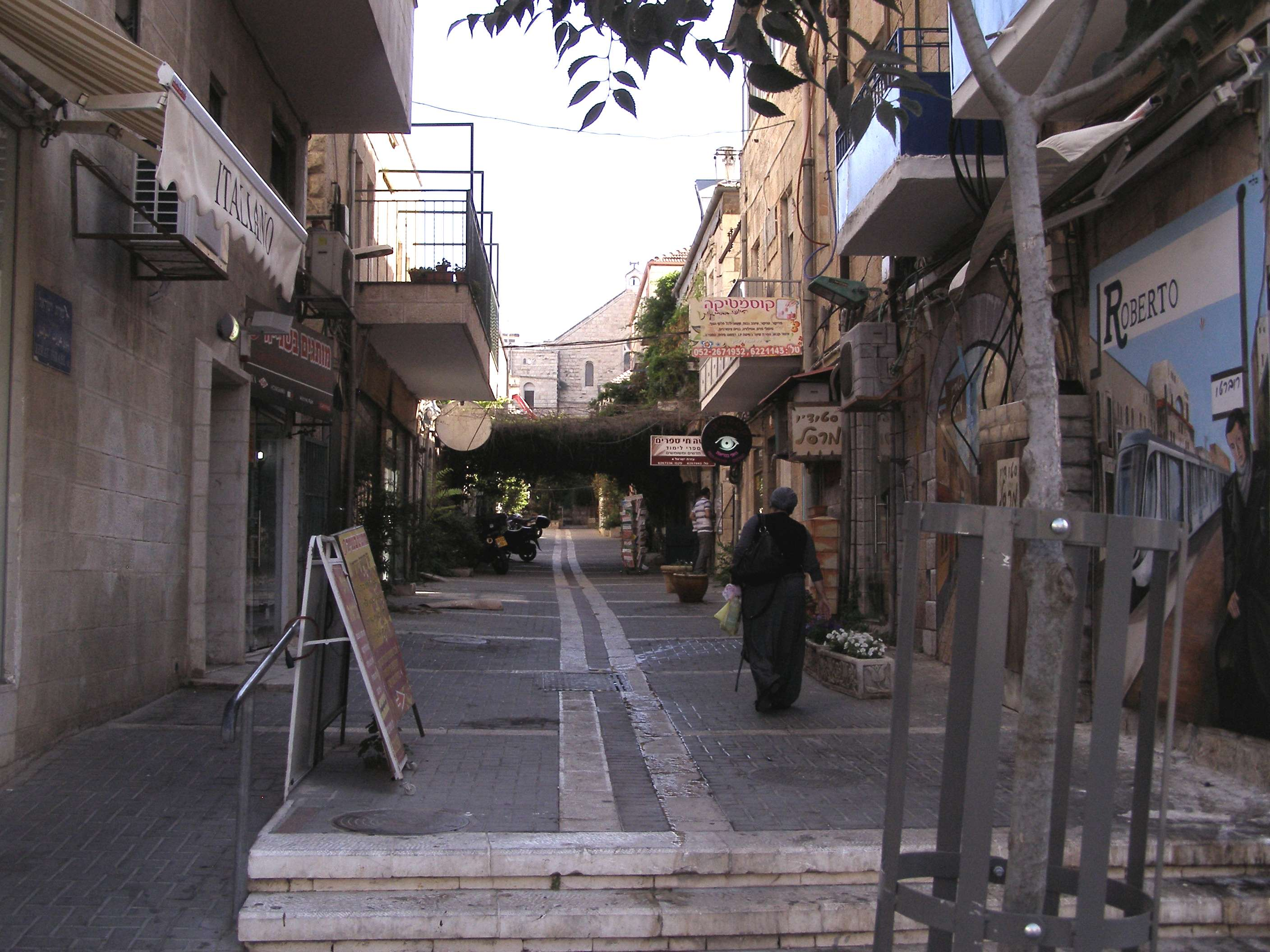
An alleyway in the Ezrat Yisrael neighborhood.

According to the foundation deed, the name of the neighborhood was derived from two verses in the Book of Psalms:

My help comes from the Lord, the Maker of heaven and earth (Psalms 121:2)
May He send you help from the sanctuary and grant you support from Zion (Psalms 20:3)

== Location ==
Ezrat Yisrael is a northeast-southwest street that runs perpendicular to Jaffa Road. It is located one block west of the intersection of Jaffa Road and King George Street, one of the vertices of the Downtown Triangle cultural and commercial district. It is a blocked street that opens only onto Jaffa Road. Above the blocked end stands the International Evangelical Church, which faces Street of the Prophets.

== History ==
The Ezrat Yisrael neighborhood was founded in 1892 by Rabbi Yaakov Meir, who later became Sephardic Chief Rabbi of Mandatory Palestine, together with local activists. One reason that historians give for the founding of the neighborhood at this location was that at the time, a group of non-Jews wished to purchase the lot. Rabbi Meir called on Jerusalem activists and neighborhood-builders Nissim Elyashar, Moshe Meltzer, and Yosef Rivlin to come up with the money to buy it for Jewish settlement. The land, measuring over 5,000 cubits, was purchased at a price of 10 francs per cubit.

Another reason given for the founding of the neighborhood in this location was the desire to establish a continuous Jewish presence from the Even Yisrael neighborhood south of Jaffa Road to the neighborhood of Mea Shearim further north.

Historians differ on the total number of homes built in 1892 – estimates range from 20 to 26 to 30. Over time, additional stories were added to the buildings.

At the beginning of the 20th century, scientific installations began to appear in Palestine. In 1904 a chemical laboratory opened in Ezrat Yisrael. In 1912 one of the first advertisements for Jewish dentists in Jerusalem was placed in HaOr, informing the public that a dentist was receiving patients in the courtyard of a pharmacist in Ezrat Yisrael.

== Notable residents ==
Abraham Moses Luncz, who resided in the Even Yisrael neighborhood on the opposite side of Jaffa Road, operated a printing press in a house at the beginning of the street.

In 1910 the neighborhood was home to Yitzhak Ben-Zvi, Rachel Yanait, David Ben-Gurion, and Yisrael Shohet, editors of the Poalei Zion weekly newspaper Ahdut ("Unity").

== Masonic Temple ==
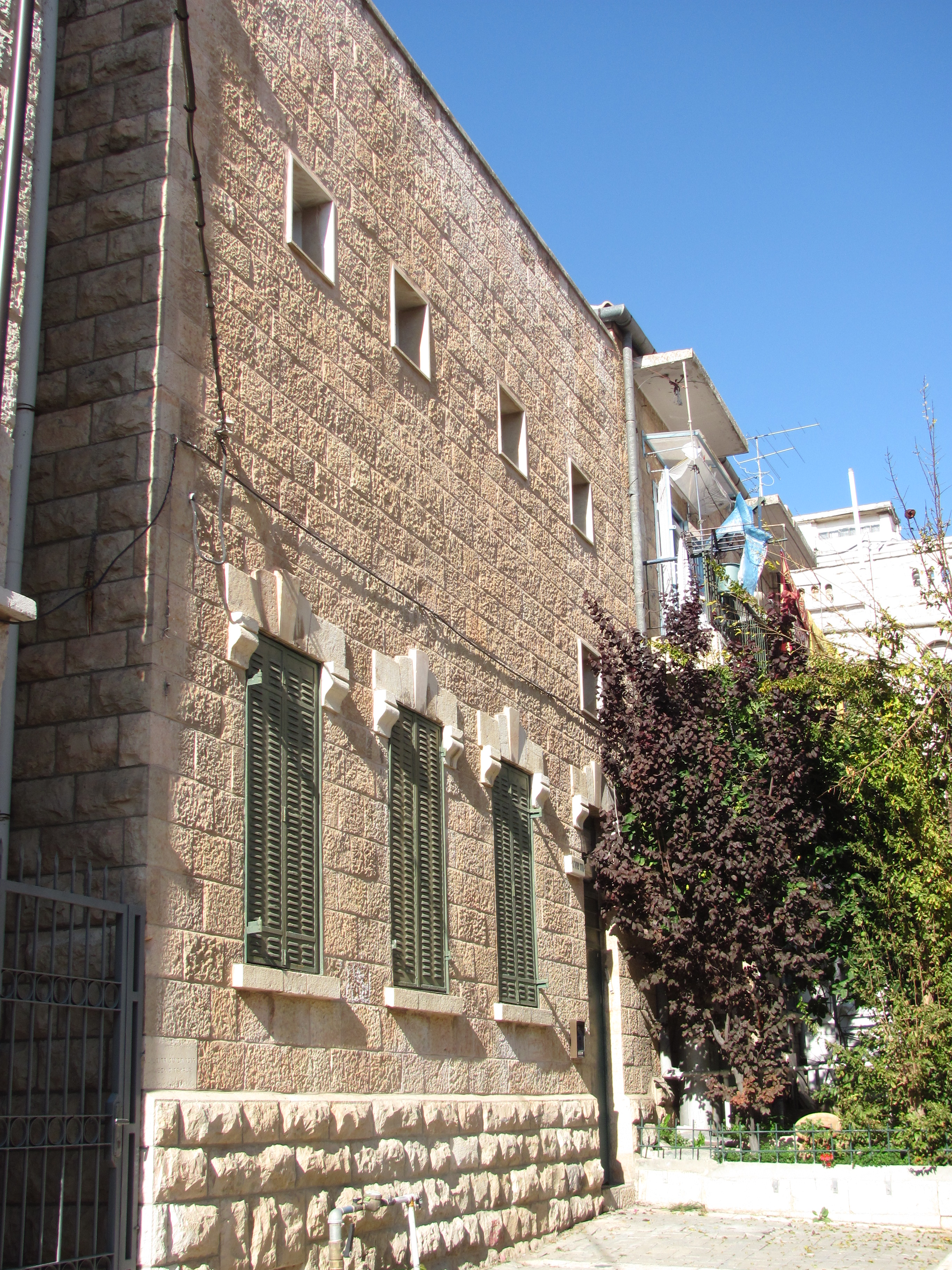
Masonic Temple on Ezrat Yisrael Street

In 1931 a Masonic Temple was founded at 13 Ezrat Yisrael Street, near the north end of the lane. The building was initiated by Arieh Levy and a group of Freemasons who each contributed 5,000 lira toward the construction. The Temple currently houses both the Ein Hashiloach Ar"i Lodge #26 and Ar"i Lodge #27. Members meet twice monthly and meetings are conducted in Hebrew. One block further west of Ezrat Yisrael Street, the intersection of Jaffa Road and Raoul Wallenberg Street was designated Freemason Square (Hebrew: ככר הבונים החפשיים) by the Jerusalem municipality.

== Sources ==
- Bar-Am, Aviva (2007). Jerusalem EasyWalks (2nd ed.). ISBN 965-90048-6-9.
- Ben-Arieh, Yehoshua (1979). עיר בראי תקופה: ירושלים החדשה בראשיתה [A City Reflected in its Times: New Jerusalem – The Beginnings] (in Hebrew). Jerusalem: Yad Izhak Ben-Zvi Publications.
- Wager, Eliyahu (1988). Illustrated Guide to Jerusalem. The Jerusalem Publishing House.
