= Yosef Rivlin =

Orthodox Jewish scholar (1836–1896)

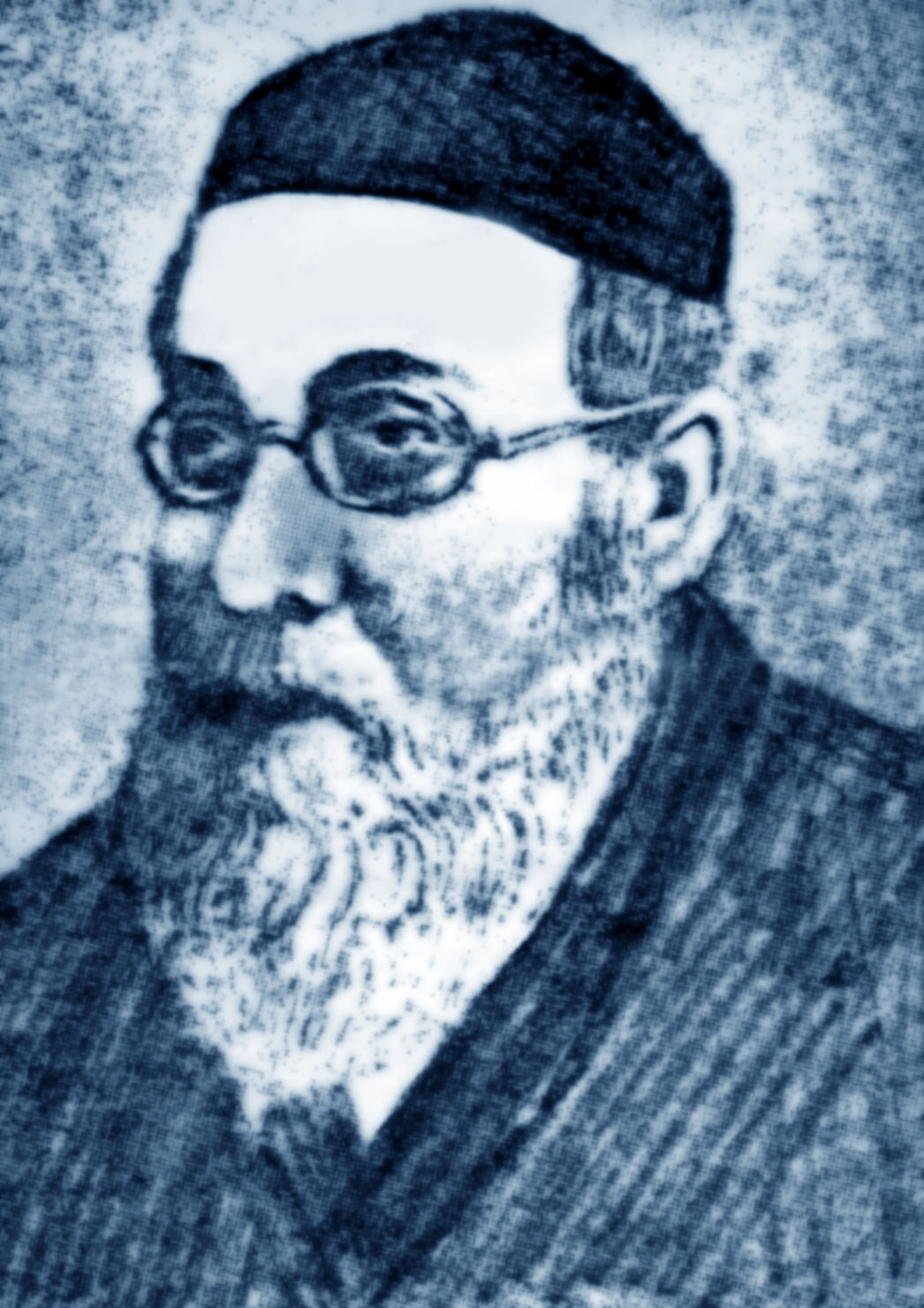

Personal life
- Born: Yosef Yitzhak Rivlin; 18 December 1836 Jerusalem, Ottoman Empire
- Died: 5 September 1896 Age: (59) Jerusalem, Ottoman Empire
- Spouse: Sara Tzipa; Miriam Fizetzer; Minna Brill Levi
- Children: 8
- Parents: Rabbi Avraham Binyamin Rivlin (father); Shifra (mother)
- Education: Etz Chaim kollel

Religious life
- Religion: Judaism

Jewish leader
- Position: Central Committee of Knesseth Israel
- Organisation: Director
- Began: 1863
- Ended: 1896
- Yahrtzeit: 27 Elul 5656

Yosef Yitzhak "Yoshya" Rivlin (Hebrew: יוסף יצחק "יושעה" ריבלין, 18 December 1836 – 5 September 1896) (Note: Other sources list his year of death as 1896.) was an Orthodox Jewish scholar, writer, and community leader in the Old Yishuv of Jerusalem. Scion of a family of Perushim, disciples of the Vilna Gaon who immigrated to Israel in the early 19th century, Rivlin spearheaded the establishment of the first Jewish neighborhoods outside the Old City walls. He helped found a total of 13 neighborhoods, beginning with Nahalat Shiv'a and Mea Shearim. His activities earned him the nickname Shtetlmacher ("Town-Maker"). He directed the Central Committee of Knesseth Israel, the supreme council of the Ashkenazi community in the Old Yishuv, for over 30 years.

== Early life and family ==
Yosef Yitzhak Rivlin was born in Jerusalem in 1836, the scion of a distinguished family of Perushim descending from the students of the Vilna Gaon. His paternal ancestors hailed from Shklov, including his father, Rabbi Avraham Binyamin Rivlin, a Talmud Torah principal in Jerusalem; his grandfather, Rabbi Moshe Rivlin, a Rosh Kollel in Reisin and Vilna who immigrated to Jerusalem in 1841 and served as maggid and leader of the Perushim community; and his great-grandfather, Rabbi Hillel Rivlin, a student of the Vilna Gaon who made aliyah with the Perushim in 1809 and was the first head of the Ashkenazi Perushim rabbinical court in Jerusalem. His mother's name was Shifra.

Rivlin absorbed the ideological vision of his paternal ancestors, preached by the Vilna Gaon, that by strengthening the Jewish settlement in the Land of Israel they could hasten the onset of the messianic redemption. At the time, the Jewish population of Jerusalem was confined to the Old City, where they were prey to poverty, overcrowding, lack of sanitation, and heavy taxes imposed by the Ottoman government. Rivlin developed a vision of expanding the Jewish settlement into neighborhoods outside the walls of Jerusalem, although that prospect carried with it exposure to attackers and wild animals that roamed beyond the protective walls of the Old City.

Rivlin received his early education in cheder and attended the Etz Chaim yeshiva in the Old City as a youth. He married Sara Tzipa, the daughter of Rabbi Yehuda Leib Goldschmidt, in 1855. During their engagement, he sent her a message via her brother that he intended to found a new Jewish neighborhood outside the Old City walls and be the first to live there. The bride's family was appalled and wanted to break the match, and Rivlin's own family thought that a dybbuk had possessed him, but the bride agreed to Rivlin's plan.

The newly-married Rivlin studied for half a day in the Etz Chaim kollel and worked as a writer for his relative, Rabbi Yosef Yoel Rivlin, who produced propaganda sheets on behalf of the Batei Machseh neighborhood and the Hurva Synagogue. He published his first Torah article at the age of 15 and went on to write prolifically about the importance of expanding the Jewish settlement in the Land of Israel as a means of ushering in the redemption.

== Neighborhood builder ==
In 1857, Rivlin founded the Bonei Yerushalayim (Builders of Jerusalem) company for the purpose of building neighborhoods outside the Old City walls. He enlisted signatories in the company from among his acquaintances, wealthy relatives in Shklov and Mohilev, and pro-Israel committees in Amsterdam and London, and also traveled to Russia and Europe with his colleagues, Yoel Moshe Salomon and Michal HaCohen, to promote the plan. The group collected 800 rubles toward the purchase of land for the neighborhood of Nahalat Shiv'a. Rivlin was also instrumental in securing an annulment of the Ottoman ban on construction outside the Old City walls, issued in 1844. Sent with Rabbi Benzion Lyon to Constantinople by the rabbis of Jerusalem, Rivlin and Lyon procured an annulment of the firman from the sultan's secretary, effective 1862.

In 1869, Rivlin and six partners established the Jewish neighborhood of Nahalat Shiv'a. Rivlin was the first to build a house and to live in it at night to prove that the settlement was viable. He protected himself from attackers by constructing a high wall around his home and paying a Turkish soldier and, later, an Arab guard, to keep an eye on him. He insisted that his wife remain in the Old City, while another Jew boarded with him. Until more homeowners moved in two and a half years later, he returned to his wife only on Shabbat. In 1872 the neighborhood was sufficiently populated that Rivlin brought his wife to live with him.

In 1873 he was one of the founders of Mea Shearim, whose name he coined. His modus operandi was to buy a house in each new neighborhood that he helped establish, live in it for a while, and then move to a new home in the next neighborhood that he founded. In each neighborhood he supervised the purchase and construction of homes and assisted home buyers in acquiring loans. He also helped establish community institutions and spoke in the local synagogue. One of his sermons inspired a wealthy philanthropist named David Reiss to underwrite the founding of another neighborhood, Beit David, in 1873.

Rivlin is credited with the establishment of 13 Jewish neighborhoods in western and northwestern Jerusalem: Nahalat Shiv'a, Mea Shearim, Even Yisrael, Beit Ya’akov, Mishkenot Yisrael, Mazkeret Moshe, Ohel Moshe, Knesset Yisrael, Zikhron Tuvya, Shevet Ahim, Shaarei Zedek, Ezrat Yisrael, and Yemin Moshe. He also helped name these neighborhoods based on allusions to the doctrine of messianic redemption.

== Community leader ==
In 1863, Rivlin was asked to head the Central Committee of Knesseth Israel, the supreme council of the Ashkenazi community in the Old Yishuv formed by Chief Rabbi Shmuel Salant, a position he held for more than 30 years until his death. The Central Committee represented the community before the Ottoman authorities on everything from day-to-day issues to critical events, such as a proposed expulsion of Jewish foreign nationals. In his capacity as a director, Rivlin also welcomed the first Hovevei Zion immigrants to the yishuv and lauded the Sephardi communities for their contribution to Jerusalem's development.

After the death of his uncle, Yosef Yoel Rivlin, in an 1865 plague, Rivlin assumed the financial management of the Kollel Amsterdam distribution committee, which distributed funds received from Sir Moses Montefiore.

== Writing ==
A prolific author, Rivlin wrote articles for the leading Hebrew newspapers in Palestine and abroad, urging the development of the yishuv as a means to hasten the messianic redemption, as preached by the Vilna Gaon. He also composed poems and gematrias, based on Kabbalah, expounding these ideas. A collection of his newspaper articles and essays was reprinted in the book Megillat Yosef (Scroll of Joseph) (1966).

== Personal life ==
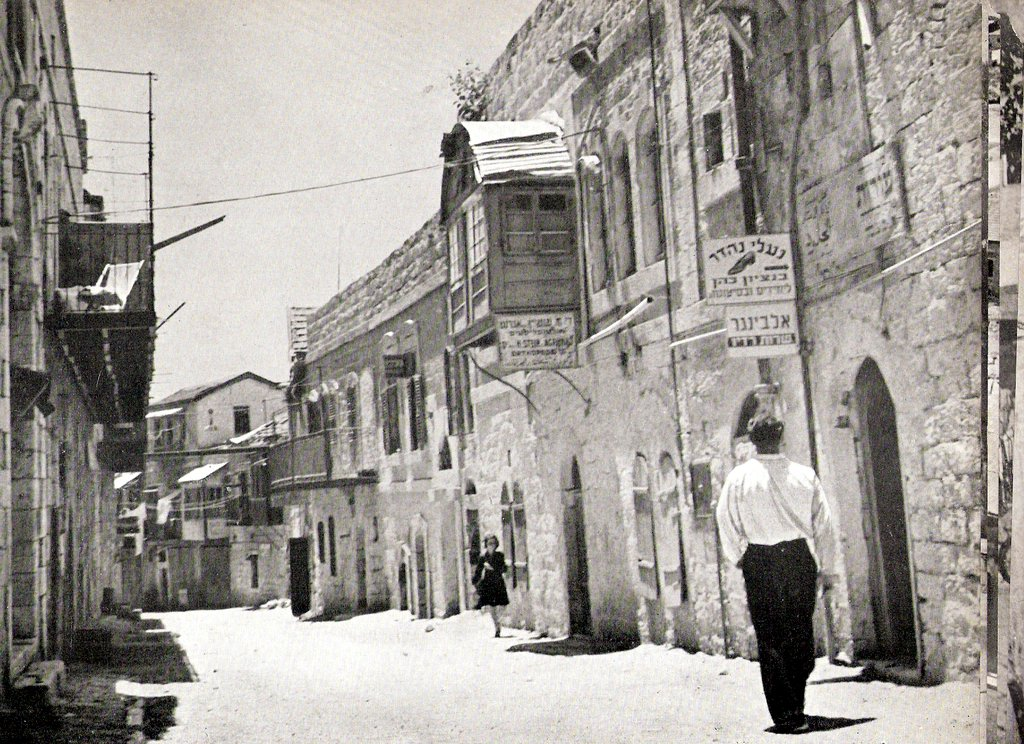
Yosef Rivlin Street, Nahalat Shiv'a, circa 1950

Rivlin and his first wife, Sara Tzipa, had their first child, a daughter, in the spring of 1873. That summer, Sara Tzipa was attacked in their Nahalat Shiv'a home by a dagger-wielding Arab; she fought him off and stabbed him to death, but succumbed to shock and died of a heart attack. Their baby daughter later died.

In 1874, Rivlin remarried to Miriam, the daughter of Rabbi Moshe Fizetzer of Brisk. Together they had seven children: Freida Raizel, Rasha Bracha, Hillel, Shlomo Zalman, Avraham Binyamin, Yocheved Shifra, and Rivka Malka. Hillel Rivlin became the secretary of the Central Committee, and was also among the founders of the village of Neve Yaakov. Shlomo Zalman Rivlin, an accomplished Hazzan, headed the Shirat Yisrael Institute and was the author of Shirei Shlomo, hazzanut compositions.

With his third wife, Minna, the daughter of Rabbi Zalman Brill Levi, Rivlin had one son, Moshe, who became a journalist for Der Morgen Journal in New York.

Although he managed huge sums in the development and construction of new neighborhoods, and his critics accused him of profiting from his activities, Rivlin lived a life of penury. Though he moved from house to house, he often had to sell the first house before the next one was built. He left nothing to his children, not even a house, and was unable to pay the doctors who treated him during his final illness. Rivlin died in his home in the Ezrat Yisrael neighborhood on Shabbat, 5 September 1896, at the age of 59. Payment for his medical care, as well as funds to provide for his widow and children after his death, were provided by Baron Shimon Wolf Rothschild of Frankfurt.

Yosef Rivlin Street in the Nahalat Shiv'a neighborhood is named after him.

== See also ==
- Rivlin family

== Sources ==
- Eisenberg, Ronald L. (2006). The streets of Jerusalem: who, what, why. Devora Publishing. p. 104. ISBN 1-932687-54-8.
- Kroyanker, David; Wahrman, Dror (1983). Jerusalem Architecture, Periods and Styles: The Jewish quarters and public buildings outside the Old City walls, 1860–1914. Jerusalem Institute for Israel Studies. ISBN 9652610194.
- Rossoff, Dovid (2004). Where Heaven Touches Earth: Jewish life in Jerusalem from Medieval times to the present. Guardian Press. ISBN 0-87306-879-3.
- Tidhar, David (1947). "Yosef Rivlin (R. Yoshea)" יוסף ריבלין (ר' יושעה). Encyclopedia of the Founders and Builders of Israel (in Hebrew). Vol. 1. Estate of David Tidhar and Touro College Libraries. p. 492.
