= Beit Ya'akov, Jerusalem =

Neighborhood in Jerusalem

Beit Ya'akov בית יעקב
- Neighborhood
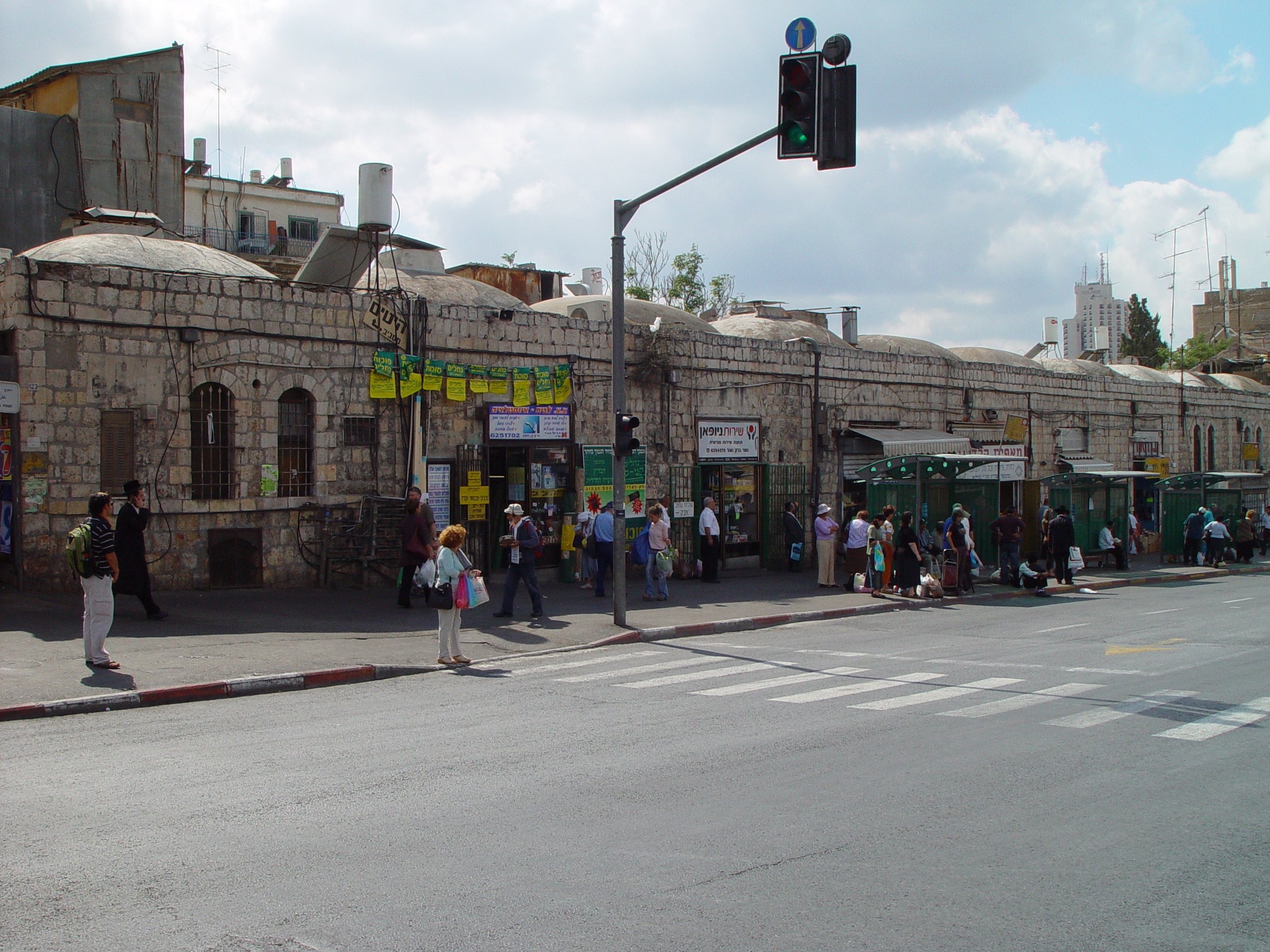
- Beit Ya'akov, view toward Jaffa Road

- Location in Jerusalem
- City: West Jerusalem
- Established: 1877

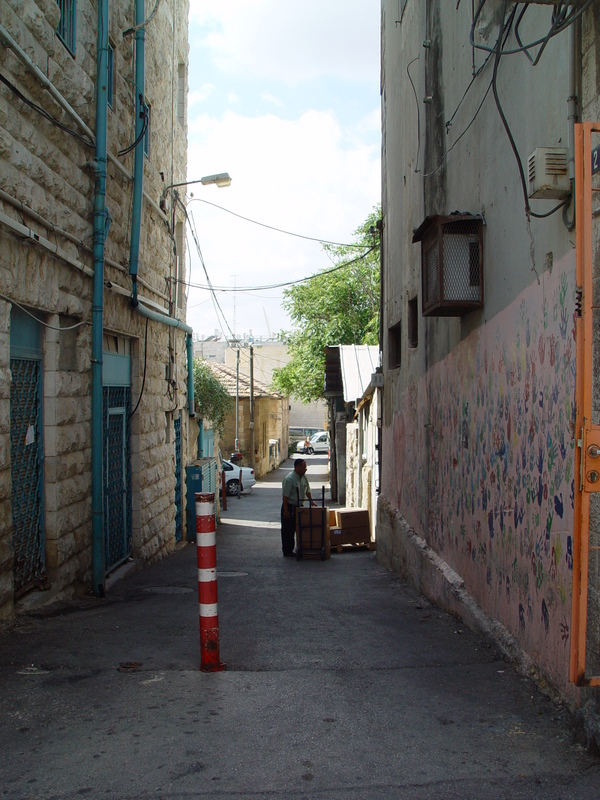
Beit Ya'akov, view toward Avishar Road.

Beit Ya'akov (Hebrew: בית יעקב, lit. 'House of Jacob') is a small neighborhood in Jerusalem, founded in 1877, the ninth Jewish neighborhood outside the walls of the Old City. The neighborhood borders Jaffa Road and Avishar Road. The Mahane Yehuda Market is located there today.

== Historical background ==
Beit Ya'akov was the last neighborhood in Jerusalem founded before the First Aliyah. This transition between the Old Yishuv and New Yishuv, and the awakening of Zionism, were not linked intentionally, but they stress the differences and similarities of these movements in the development of Israel and Jerusalem.

In the 1860s and 1870s, the Old Yishuv expanded beyond the walls of the Old City, which was until then the traditional residential limit for Jerusalem residents. Other new neighborhoods were founded and Jerusalem grew. This building and expansion spawned new public and cultural institutions, intense activities which were driven by economic necessity, crowding and poverty in the traditional community.

The development of these neighborhoods in the end of the 19th century was more like evolution, not like a new urban creation. A fine example may be found in the works of Joseph Rivlin.

The 1870s saw the meeting between the Old Yishuv and the new immigrants of the First Aliyah. The lines of similarity between the two movements to settle Israel stand in the shadow of a conceptual distinction - the radical nationalist foundations of the new movement spawned a chasm between it and the Old, Orthodox religious, Yishuv.

== Founding of the neighborhood ==
Beit Ya'akov was founded by a group of settlers under the leadership of Rabbi Moshe Graf, one of the appointees of the "Horodna Kollel" of the Ashkenazic community, and a member of the council of Mea She'arim. The neighborhood was called "Beit Ya'akov" because 70 houses that the founders planned for it, based on the Biblical verse that 70 people came with Ya'akov (Jacob) to Egypt.

Pinchas Grievsky explains in his book The Yishuv Outside the City Walls that the land of the neighborhood is 44,000 square cubits in area, and was purchased for a price of 500 Napoleonic gold.

The construction was typical for the outer Jerusalem neighborhoods of that era. A wide yard, with an underground cistern that served to collect and preserve water for residents. In the neighborhood were public facilities like a bath house, a flour storehouse, a bakery, a synagogue and Torah school. Around the common yard, single-story residences were built to face the yard.

M. N. Kohanov in his book Sha'alu Shlom Yerushalayim (1969–1970) writes:

About six reese [a biblical measurement] walk from Even Yisrael straight up Jaffa Road there is the Beit Ya'akov group on the downslope of the mountain, it was founded in 1875 from 70 people, so the group and city named it "Beit Ya'akov" like the 70 people in Jacob's family [who went to Egypt]. Until now there stand twenty houses, a large pit, and a large and beautiful Beth Midrash. This group, though its leaders are honored and active, most of them are poor and miserable and cannot pay the costs for each one.

Grievsky in his book adds:

This neighborhood, when it was founded in 1876-7, was too far from the city. The surrounding was a desolate desert with jagged rocks. People arriving from Yafo passed by, riding on donkeys and horses. ... And here, of all places, the builders decided to pave a road for all comers and to establish a neighborhood for Jews, and they called it Beit Ya'akov.

Establishment of the neighborhood suffered great difficulties. The 70 families took upon themselves to build houses, and about two years after the group came together, the first foundations were laid, but in the year of foundations only 15 houses were built, and the other members of the group acquired bare fields. Until 1881 the neighborhood had only 20 houses.

In the first years, because of the isolation of the neighborhood, the few men had to rotate night guard duty to prevent raids by Arabs who lived in the surrounding area.

== Gallery ==
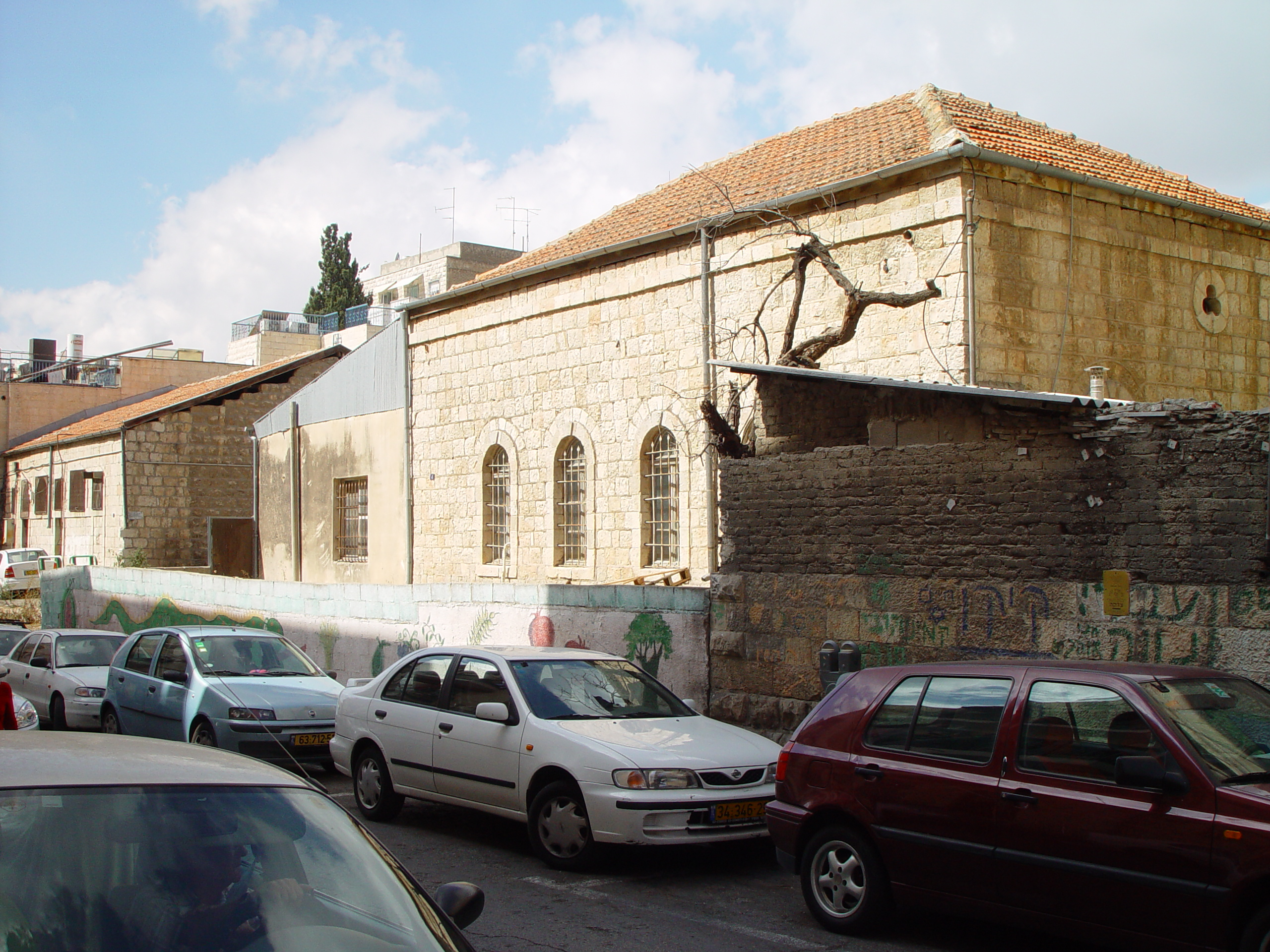
Beit Ya'akov in Jerusalem

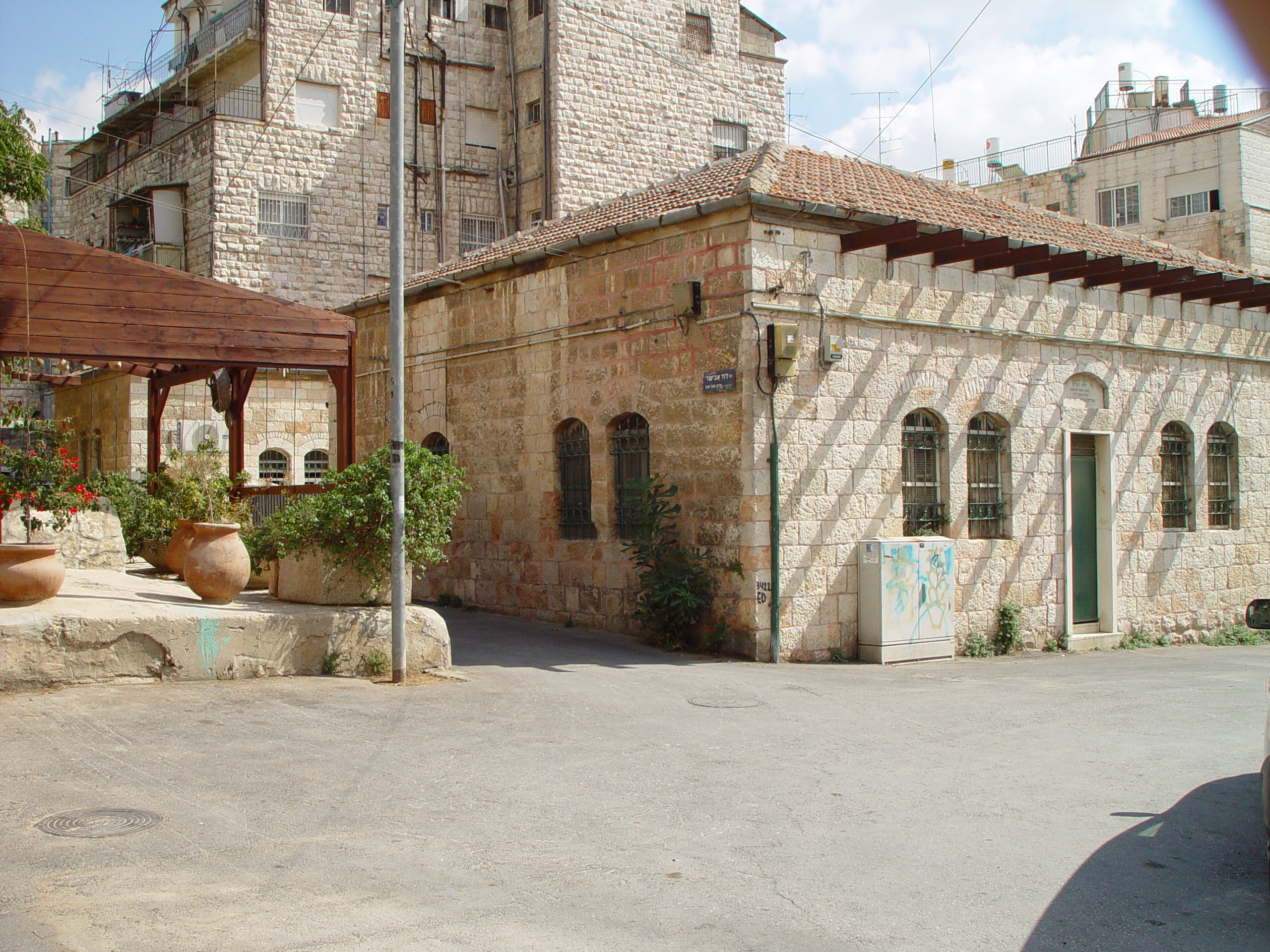
Beit Yehuda synagogue in Beit Ya'akov

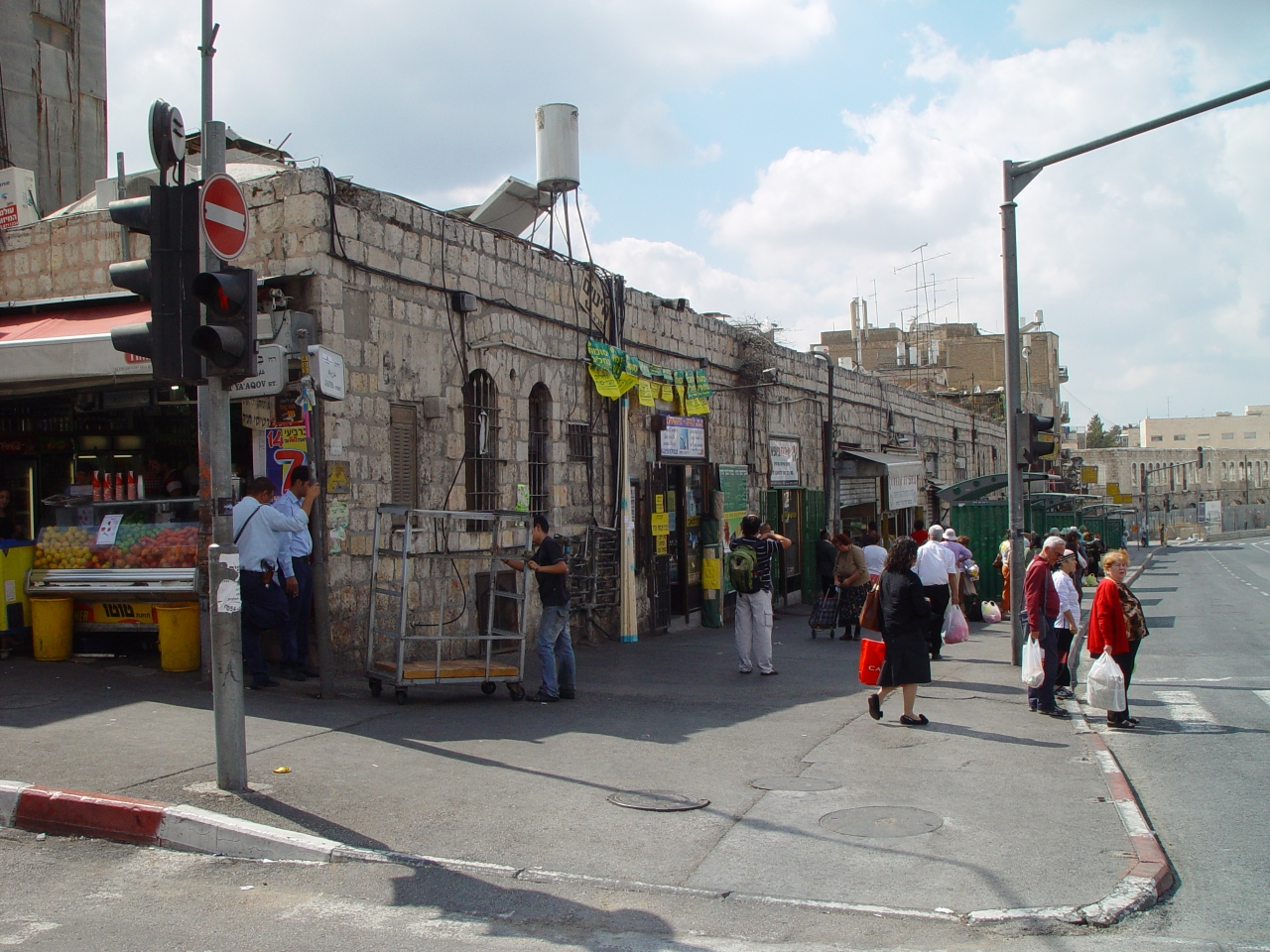
Corner of Jaffa Road and Beit Ya'akov Road; Mahane Yehuda Market

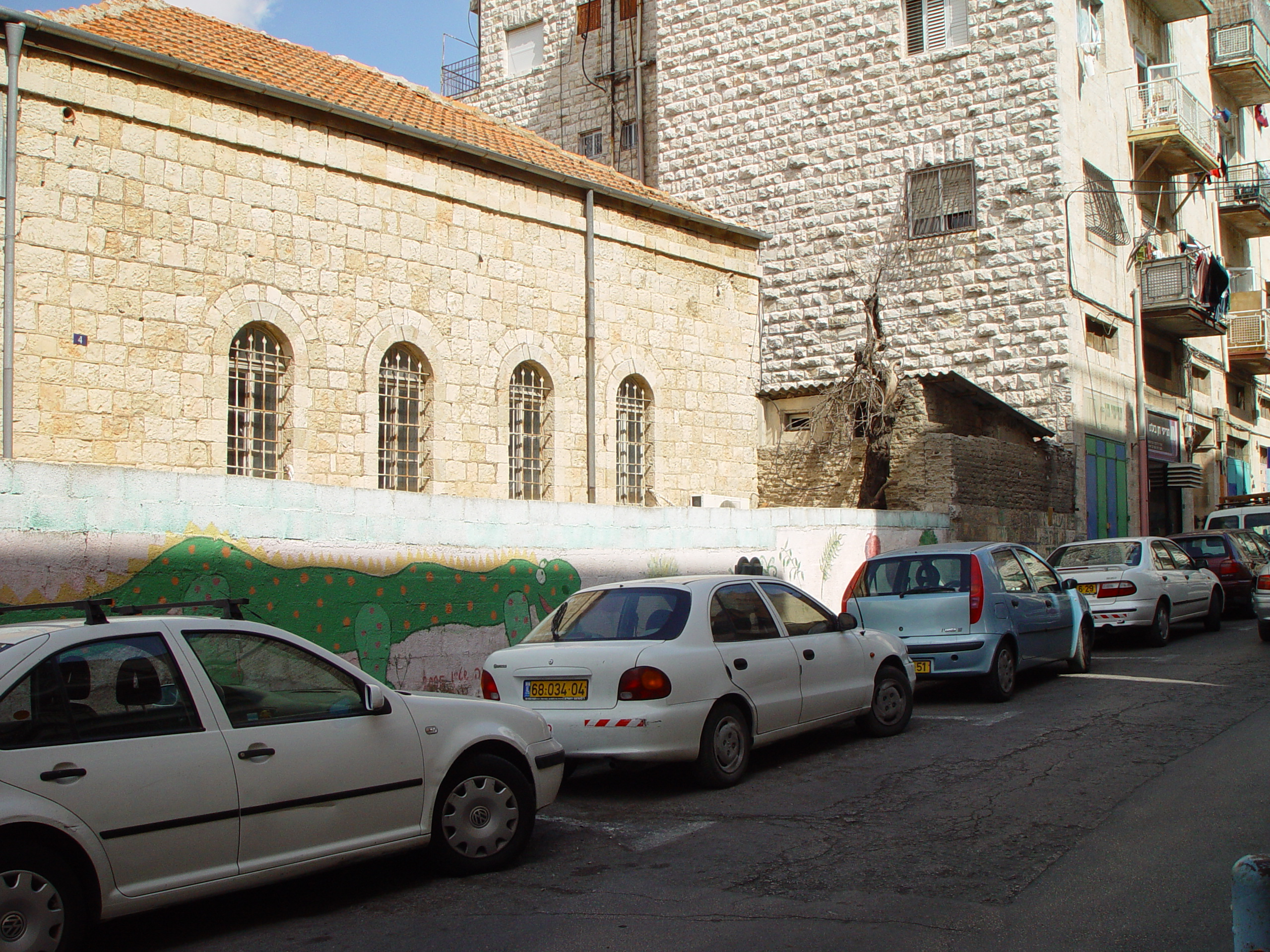
HaDekel Road; Mahane Yehuda Market

== See also ==
- Expansion of Jerusalem in the 19th century
- Mahane Yehuda Market
