= Aaron ben Eliezer (poet) =

Liturgical poet

Aaron ben Eliezer was a liturgical poet, who lived in Safed from the year 1545.

He was the author of a collection of poems and prayers printed at Mantua in 1561, entitled Sefer ha-Miẓnefet (The Book of the Miter). His booklet treats chiefly of the glories of Palestine, for love of which land he had left his home; and it includes a number of poems upon the thirteen articles of the Jewish creed. This Aaron is probably the same as the one honorably mentioned by a writer of 1500-35 given in Luncz, Jerusalem Yearbook, iii. 98, 104, Hebrew part.
