= Zikhron Tuvya =

Neighborhood of Jerusalem, Israel

Coordinates: 31°46′59.93″N 35°12′43.71″E

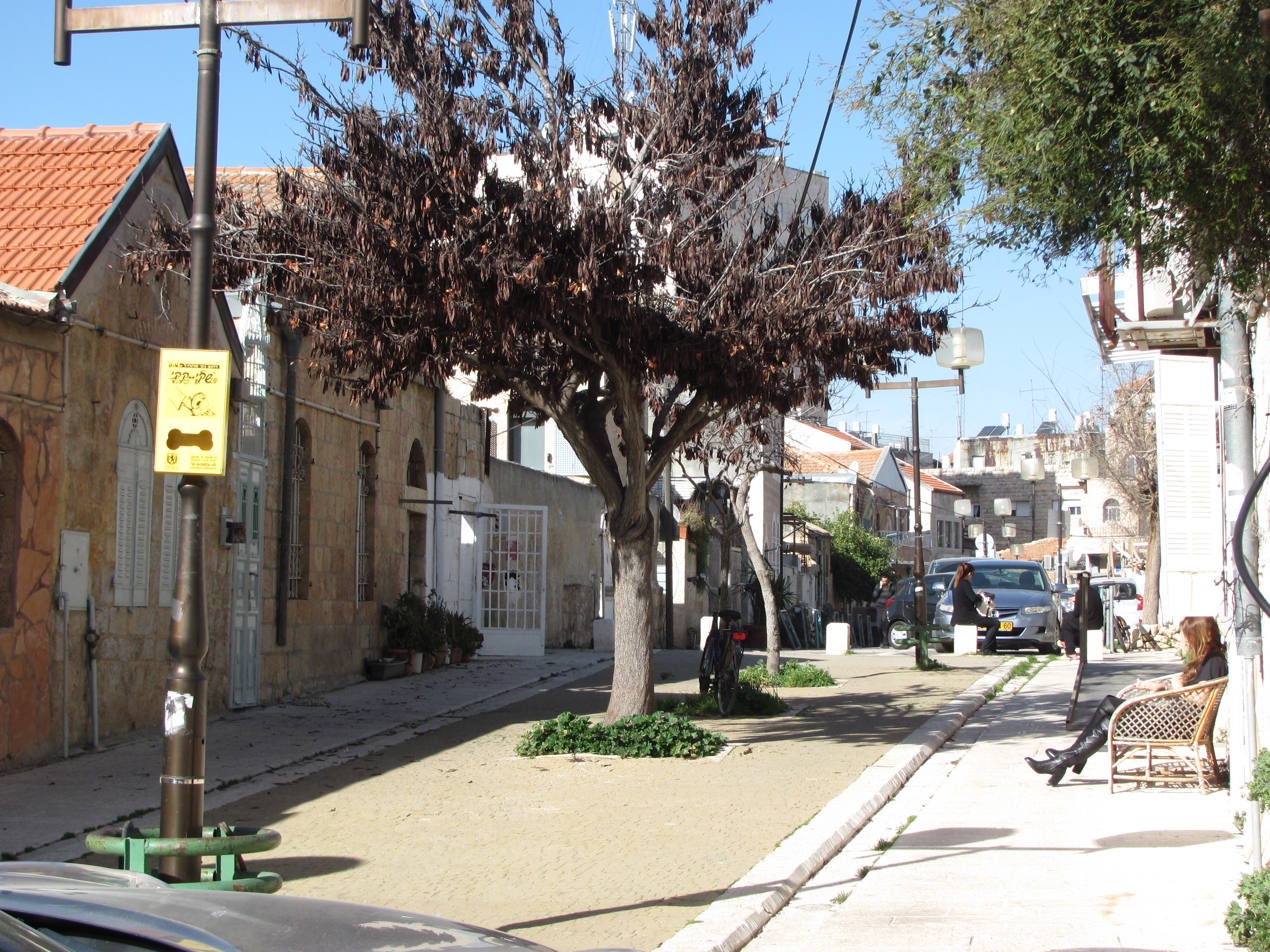
Zikhron Tuvya Street, 2015

Zikhron Tuvya (Hebrew: זכרון טוביה, Recollection of [God's] Goodness), also spelled Zichron Tuvia, is a former courtyard neighborhood in Jerusalem. Founded in 1890, it was the twenty-third Jewish neighborhood to be established outside the Old City walls. The neighborhood consisted of parallel row-houses facing each other across a wide street, today named Zikhron Tuvya Street. Initially populated by tradesmen and workshops, it became a residential neighborhood after the 1920s. It is now part of the larger Nachlaot neighborhood.

== Name ==
The name of the neighborhood is taken from the biblical verse:

A recollection of Your abundant goodness they will utter (Psalms 145:8)

The name could also have been a tribute to Rabbi Tuvya Gedalia Freund, the Rav of one of the neighborhood founders, Mechel Leib Katz, and "an expression of gratitude" to Rabbi Yosef Rivlin, the chief founder of this and many other Jerusalem neighborhoods.

== Location ==
Zikhron Tuvya was bordered by the Mahane Yehuda Market to the north, the Ohel Moshe neighborhood to the east, the Shevet Ahim neighborhood to the south, and the Nahalat Zion neighborhood to the west.

== History ==
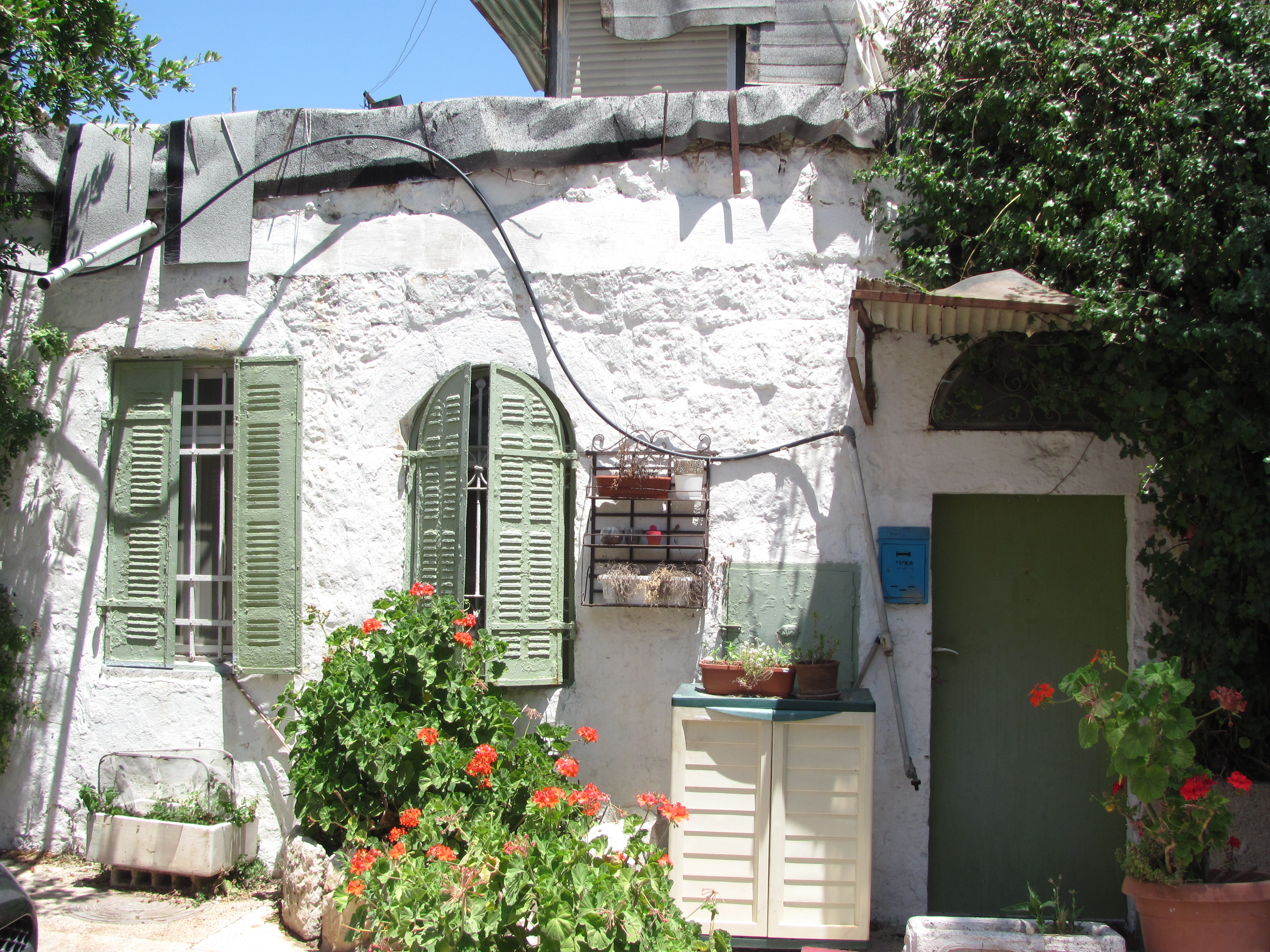
House on Zikhron Tuvya Street

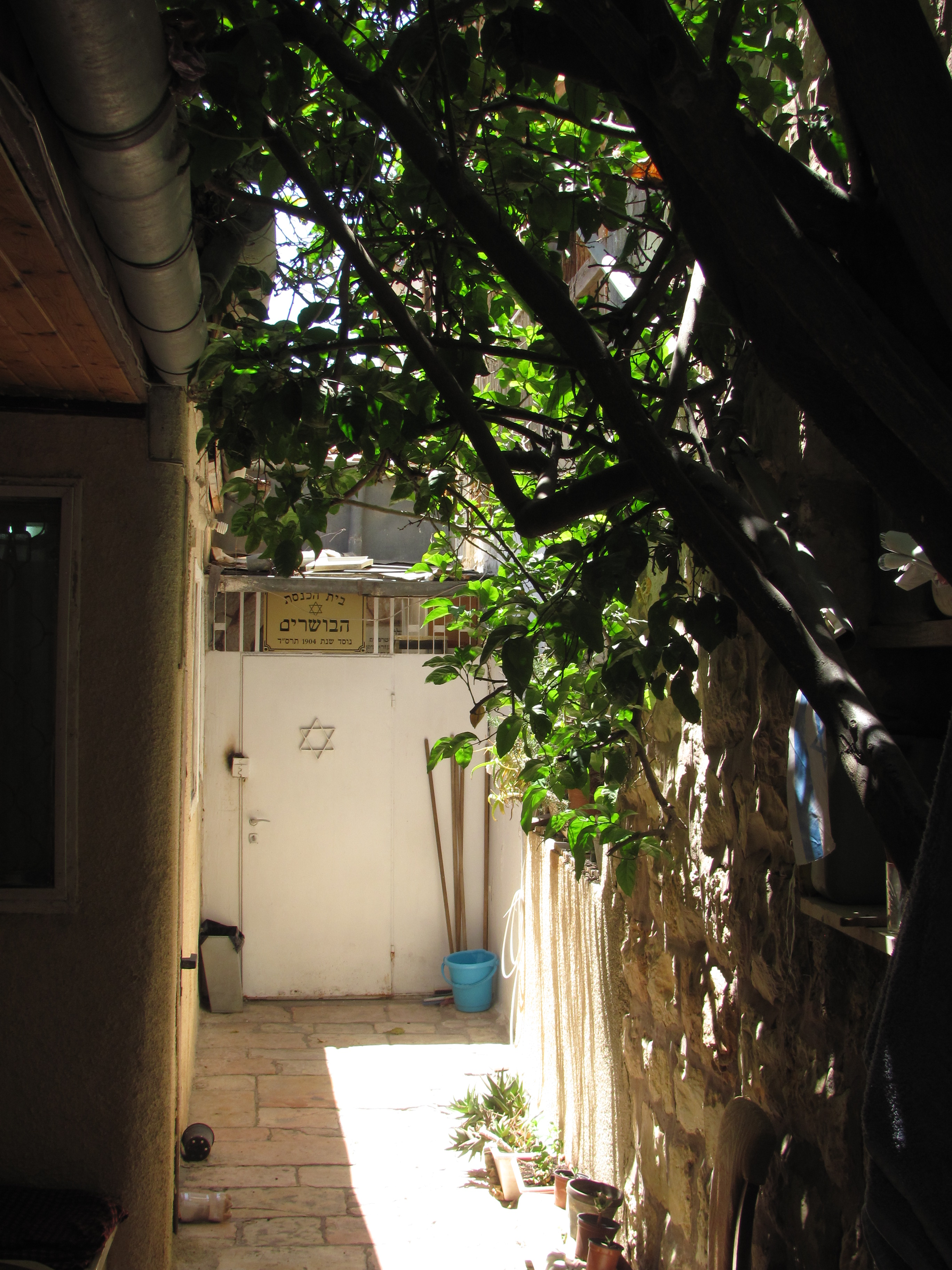
Courtyard of the Bushrim Synagogue

Zikhron Tuvya was founded in 1890. It was the twenty-third Jewish neighborhood established outside the Old City Walls, and the eleventh neighborhood founded by Yosef Rivlin. Other founders included Rabbis Nota Zvi Hamburger, David Boymgarten, Shmuel Zukerman, and Mechel Leib Katz. Moshe Meltzer Kantrowitz purchased the land from the Arabs of Lifta.

The initial plan called for the construction of 100 homes, but in the end only 30 to 40 were completed. The neighborhood, designed by Conrad Schick, was laid out as two parallel rows of single-family houses fronted by small courtyards, with the entrances to the houses facing each other across a wide expanse.

By 1897 the neighborhood had 30 houses. A 1916 survey reported 92 houses and 298 residents in Zikhron Tuvya.

In its early years, Zikhron Tuvya was home to tradesmen rather than families. Workshops of "tailors, tinkers, locksmiths, shoemakers and blacksmiths" filled the street. Business was brisk, while to the north, in an empty lot next to the Beit Ya'akov neighborhood on Jaffa Road, a "disorganized" shuk (open-air market) of Arab vendors operated in the late nineteenth and early twentieth centuries. When this shuk was turned into a permanent Jewish market known as Mahane Yehuda Market in the late 1920s, business slowed in Zikhron Tuvya. Eventually the workshops closed and families took up residence on the street.

Kollel Reisin from White Russia purchased the courtyard at number 35 for occupancy by 18 people. The words חצר כולל רייסן (Courtyard of Kollel Reisin) are engraved on the lintel of the gate to the courtyard. Today the apartments in this courtyard are rented from the kollel by Haredi families.

The Bushrim Synagogue, founded in 1904 on behalf of olim from Bushehr, Persia, still operates at 12 Zikhron Tuvya Street. The room for the synagogue was part of the apartment of Rachel bat Shlomo, who moved into another room in her courtyard after donating this space. The Torah ark in this synagogue faces south rather than the traditional eastern orientation.

== Renovation ==
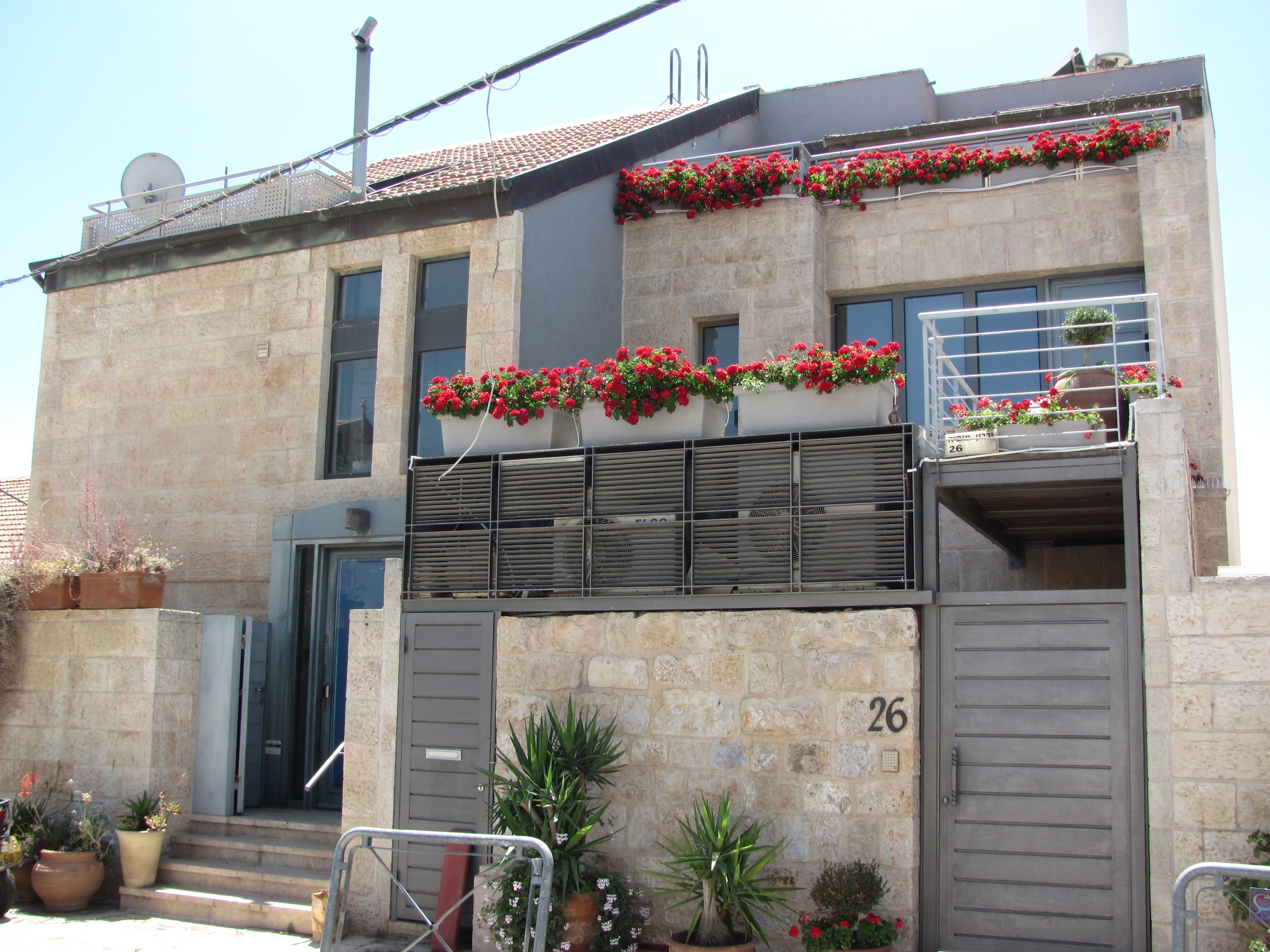
Yefe Nof House

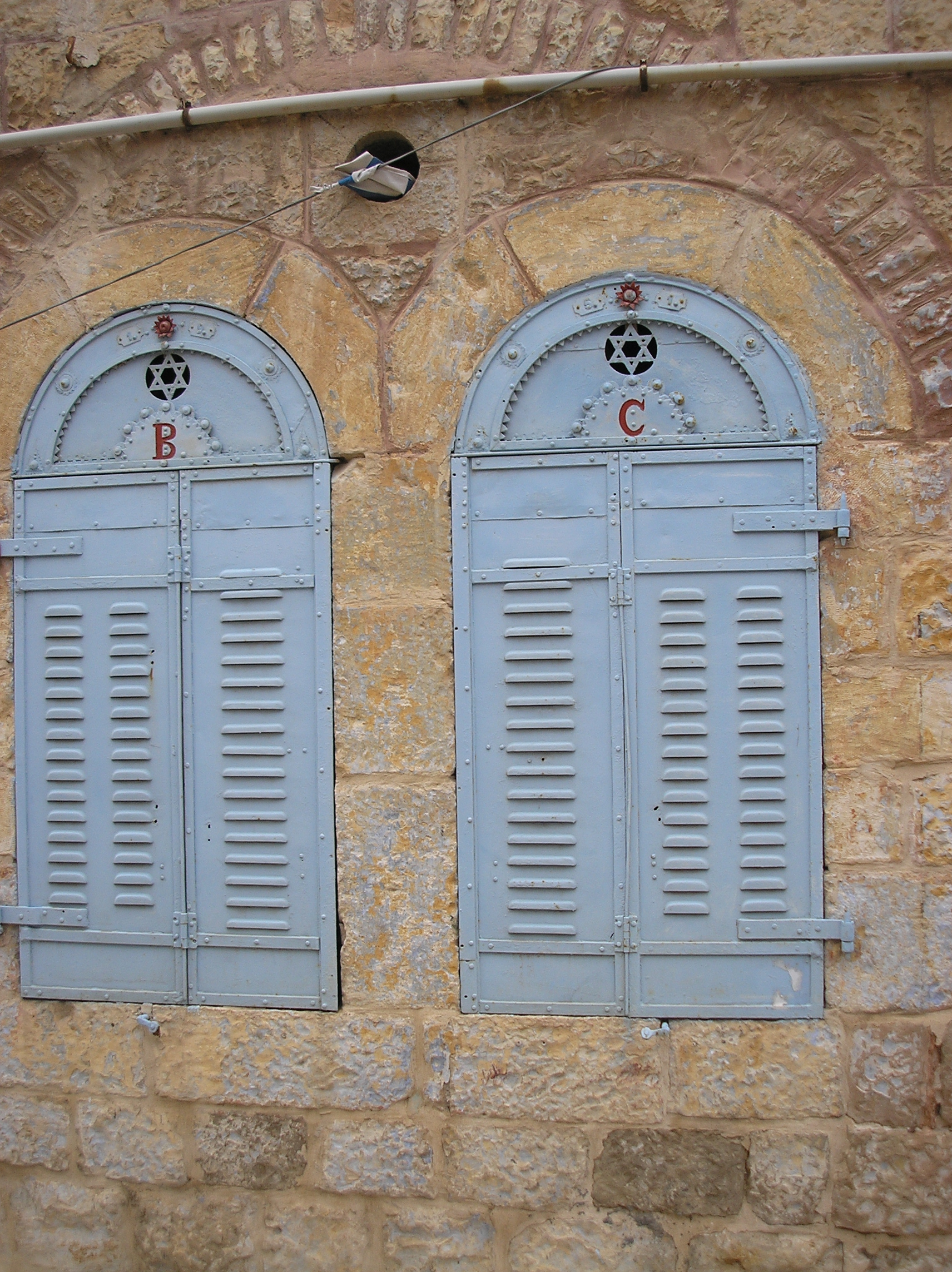
Blue-painted window shutters in Zikhron Tuvya

In 1992 the Jerusalem municipality designated Zikhron Tuvya as the first historic neighborhood to undergo rehabilitation, due to its severe state of deterioration and neglect. The street was paved and turned into a parking lot, with vehicles allowed to enter and exit from one end of the street only. Upgraded light standards were also installed.

The process of home remodeling began at that time and continues to this day. A notable renovation is the Yefe Nof House (#26), which was rebuilt in 2000. The work involved constructing a new two-story edifice on the base of the original one-room house, which was 5 metres (16 ft) wide.

According to a 2009 Jerusalem survey, Zikhron Tuvya, like other historic neighborhoods in the vicinity, has an average apartment size of 48 square metres (520 sq ft), one of the smallest in the city. The exterior of the homes sport a variety of blue-painted doors, windows, and gates, as well as horseshoes and hamsas, to guard against the evil eye.

== Landmarks ==
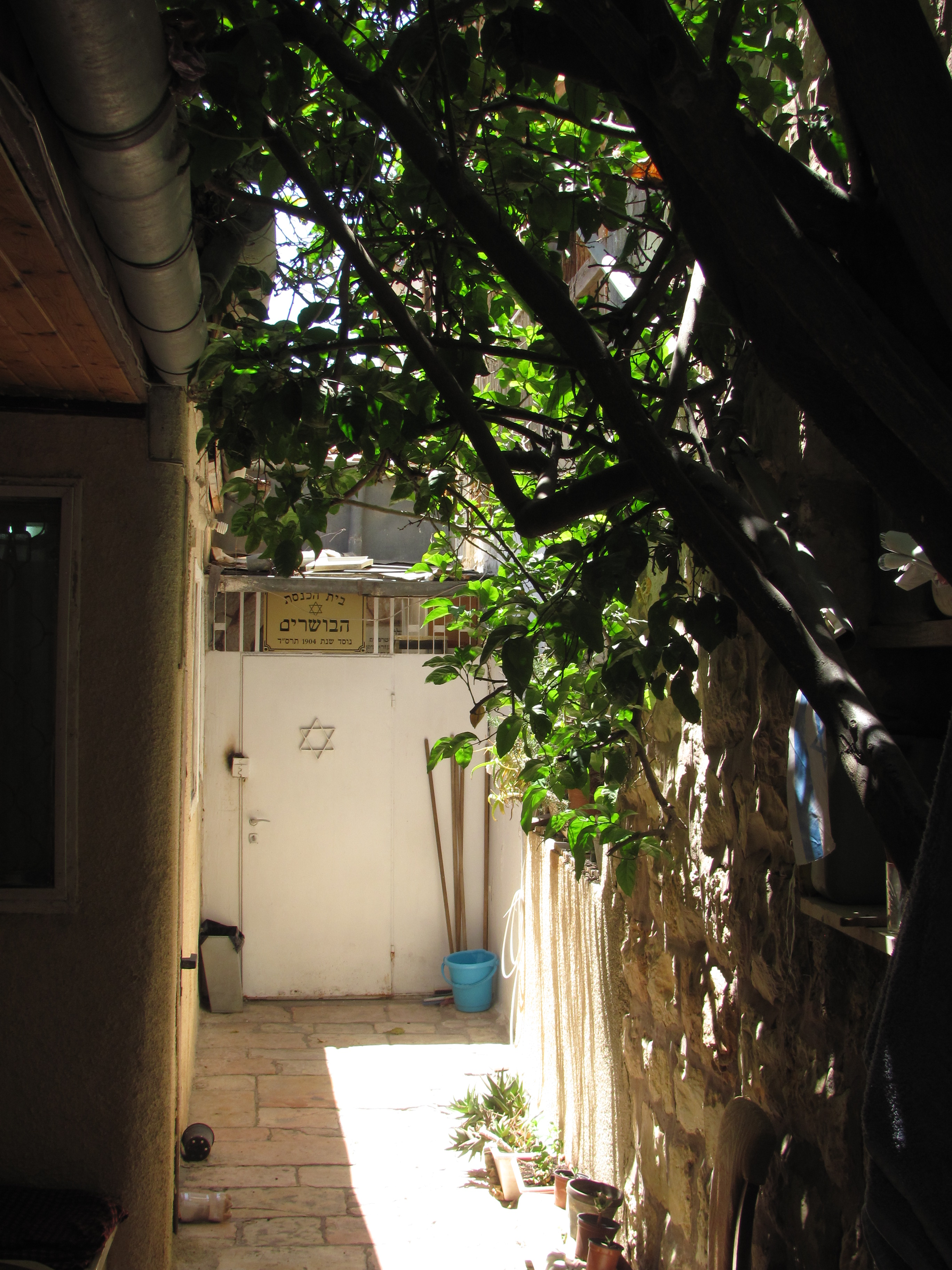
Bushrim Synagogue

- Bushrim Synagogue (#12)
- Yafe Nof House (#26)
- Kollel Reisin courtyard (#35)

== Notable residents ==
- Rabbi Shlomo Zalman Porush, charity trustee in the Old Yishuv
