= Abraham Moses Luncz =

Russian scholar and editor

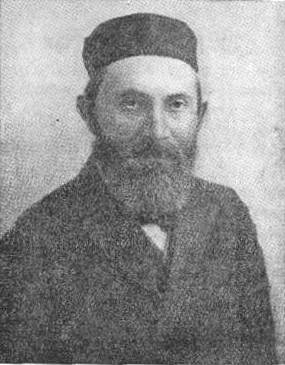
Abraham Moses Luncz

Abraham Moses Luncz (December 9, 1854 – 1918) (Hebrew: אברהם לונץ) was a Russian-Jewish scholar and editor born at Kovno, Russia. At age 14 he came to Jerusalem. Luncz, who grew blind early in life, founded, in conjunction with Dr. Koisewski, an institution for the blind at Jerusalem.

In the exploration of the Holy Land, Luncz has rendered great services from the historical, geographical, and physical standpoints, through his guide-books for Palestine, his Palestine annuals, and his Jerusalem almanac:

- Netibot Ẓiyyon we-Yerushalayim: Topography of Jerusalem and Its Surroundings (vol. i, 1876)
- Jerusalem, Jahrbuch zur Beförderung einer Wissenschaftlich Genauen Kenntnis des Jetzigen und des Alten Palästina (Hebrew and German, 6 vols., 1881–1903, Hebrew: ירושלים, שנתון לידיעת ארץ ישראל)
- Literarischer Palästina-Almanach (Hebrew; since 1894).

He owned a Hebrew printing press in the Ezrat Yisrael neighborhood, across the street from his own home in Even Yisrael. From there he issued a number of works by Jewish Palestinian scholars, Estori Farḥi's Kaftor wa-Feraḥ and Josef Schwarz's Tebu'ot ha-Areẓ being the first works published. He also produced a travel guide to Israel. As of 1904, he had in press a new edition of the Jerusalem Talmud with commentary and introduction.

== Jewish Encyclopedia bibliography ==
- Sokolow Sefer Zikkaron, p. 184.
