= Aaron ben Eliezer (rabbi) =

German Talmudist

Aaron ben Eliezer was a German Talmudist, who flourished in the thirteenth century.

That he was considered a great man at that time is proved by the actions of his contemporary, R. Meir ben Baruch of Rothenberg, acknowledged to be the greatest rabbinical authority of that age. Of R. Aaron the latter modestly remarks, in one of his responsa (ed. Prague, p. 246), "I must be brief, the matter being under consideration by great men; namely, by the high court of R. Aaron." Abigdor ha-Kohen, chief rabbi of Austria, who kept up a regular correspondence with him, referred to him with great respect, calling him "my teacher".

He appears to be identical with that R. Aaron of whom it is said in Or Zaru'a (p. 103b), "Now everything depends on R. Aaron, the only man who combines scholarship, ripe experience, and authority in one; he is called upon to fight for God and His law, and we are ready to follow him."
