= Even Yisrael (neighborhood) =

Neighborhood of Jerusalem, Israel

Coordinates: 31.7832°N 35.2171°E

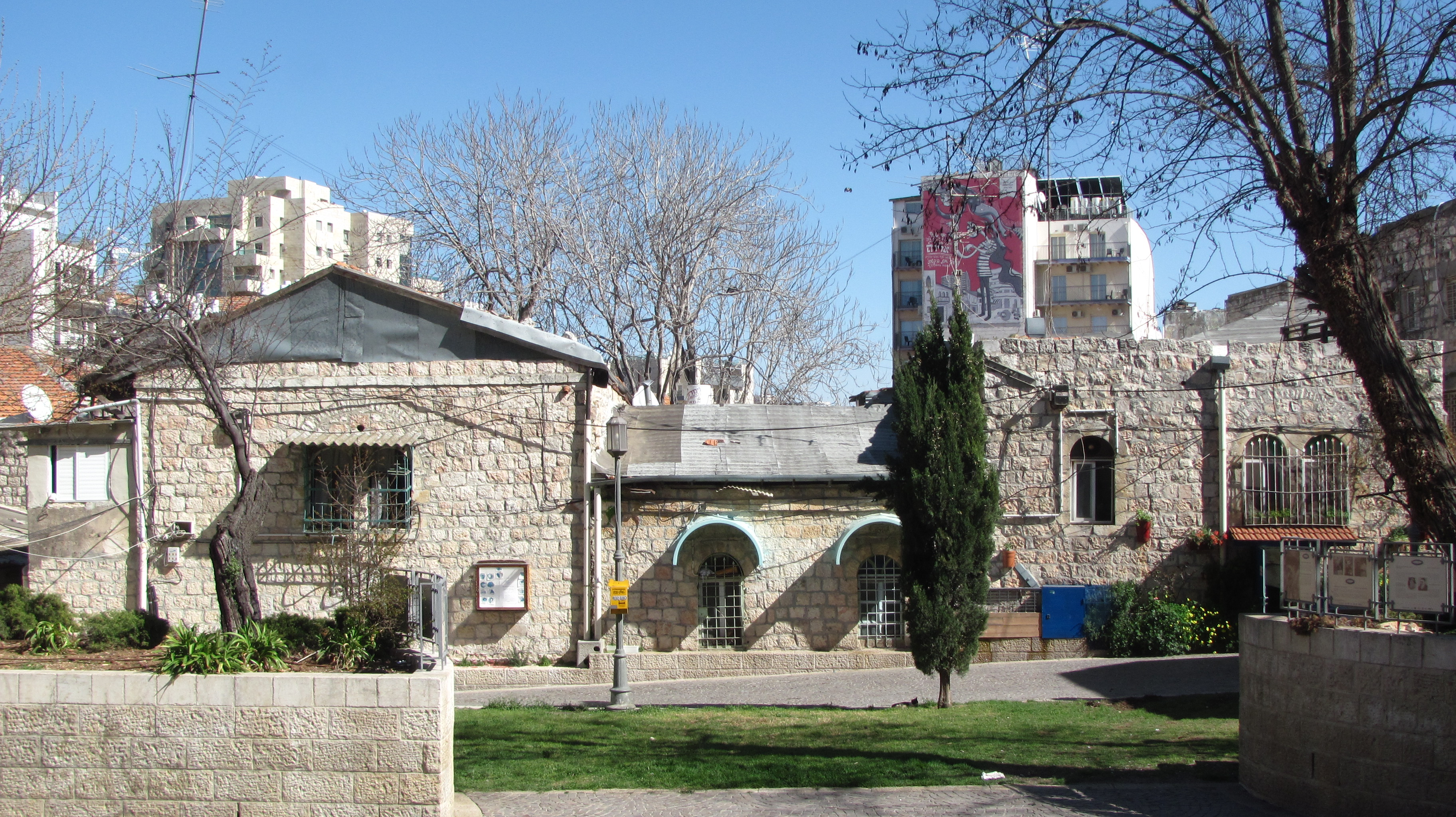
Even Yisrael row houses

Even Yisrael (Hebrew: אבן ישראל, Rock of Israel) is a former courtyard neighborhood in Jerusalem. Built in 1875, it was the sixth Jewish neighborhood to be established outside the Old City walls. It is now part of the Nachlaot neighborhood. In 2004 the neighborhood underwent preservation and renovation by the Jerusalem Municipality, which re-paved and re-landscaped the central courtyard and added a small stone amphitheater for tour groups and daytime passersby.

== Name ==
The neighborhood received its name from the 53 members of the building society (in Hebrew, the word even [rock] has the numerical value of 53). The name also reflects the biblical verse:

But his bow remained firm, and the arms of his hands were made supple, by the hands of the Mighty One of Jacob, from thence is the Shepherd, the Rock of Israel (Genesis 49:24).

This verse is part of the blessing given by Jacob to his son Joseph; Joseph was also the name of Yosef Rivlin, one of the founders of the neighborhood.

== Location ==
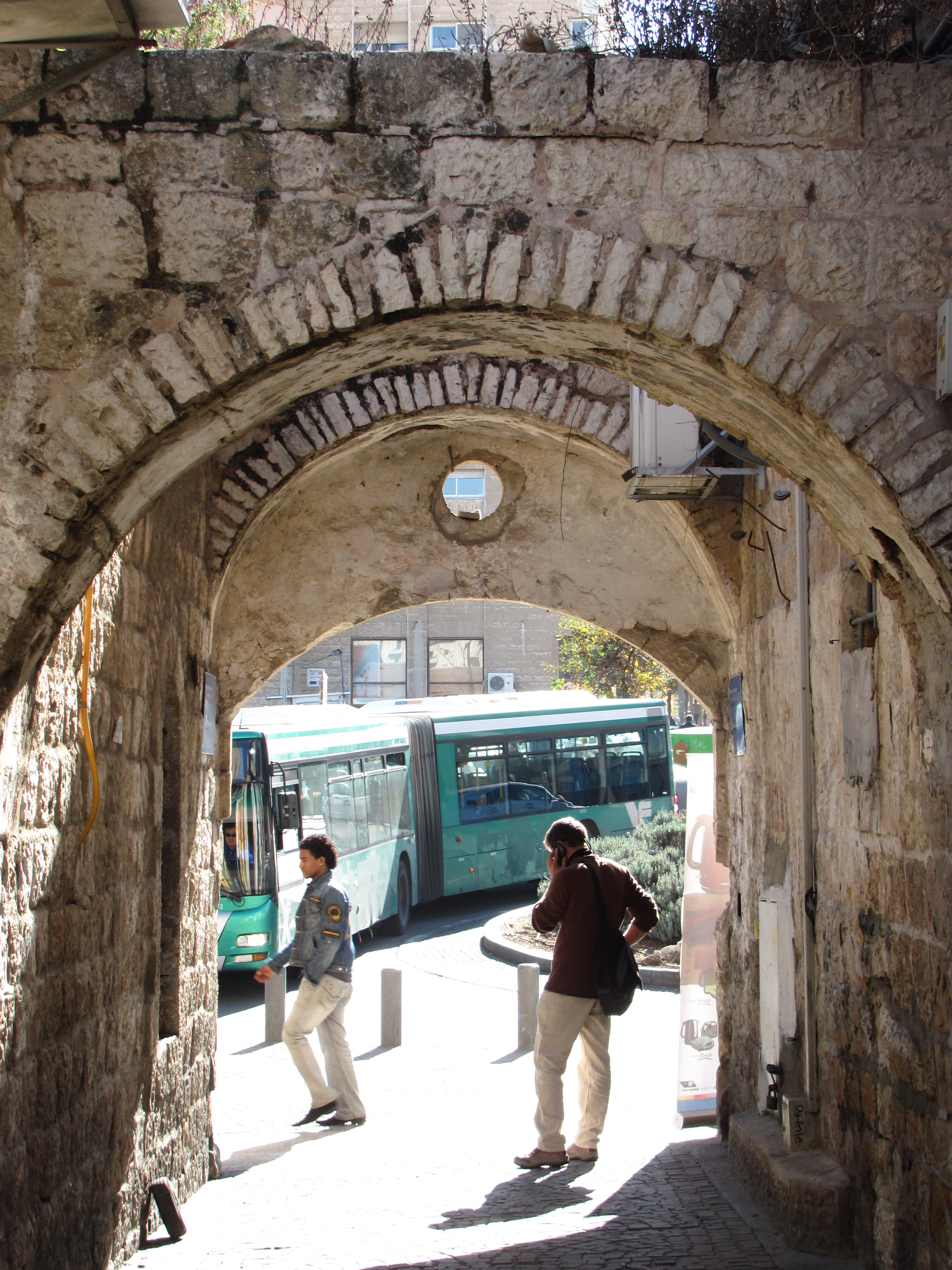
Southern gateway leading to Agrippas Street

Even Yisrael is bounded by Jaffa Road to the north, Even Yisrael Street to the east, Agrippas Street to the south, and Baruchoff Street to the west. A second courtyard was built to the east of the residential courtyard to accommodate shops and workshops; this courtyard abuts the present-day Even Yisrael Street.

== History ==
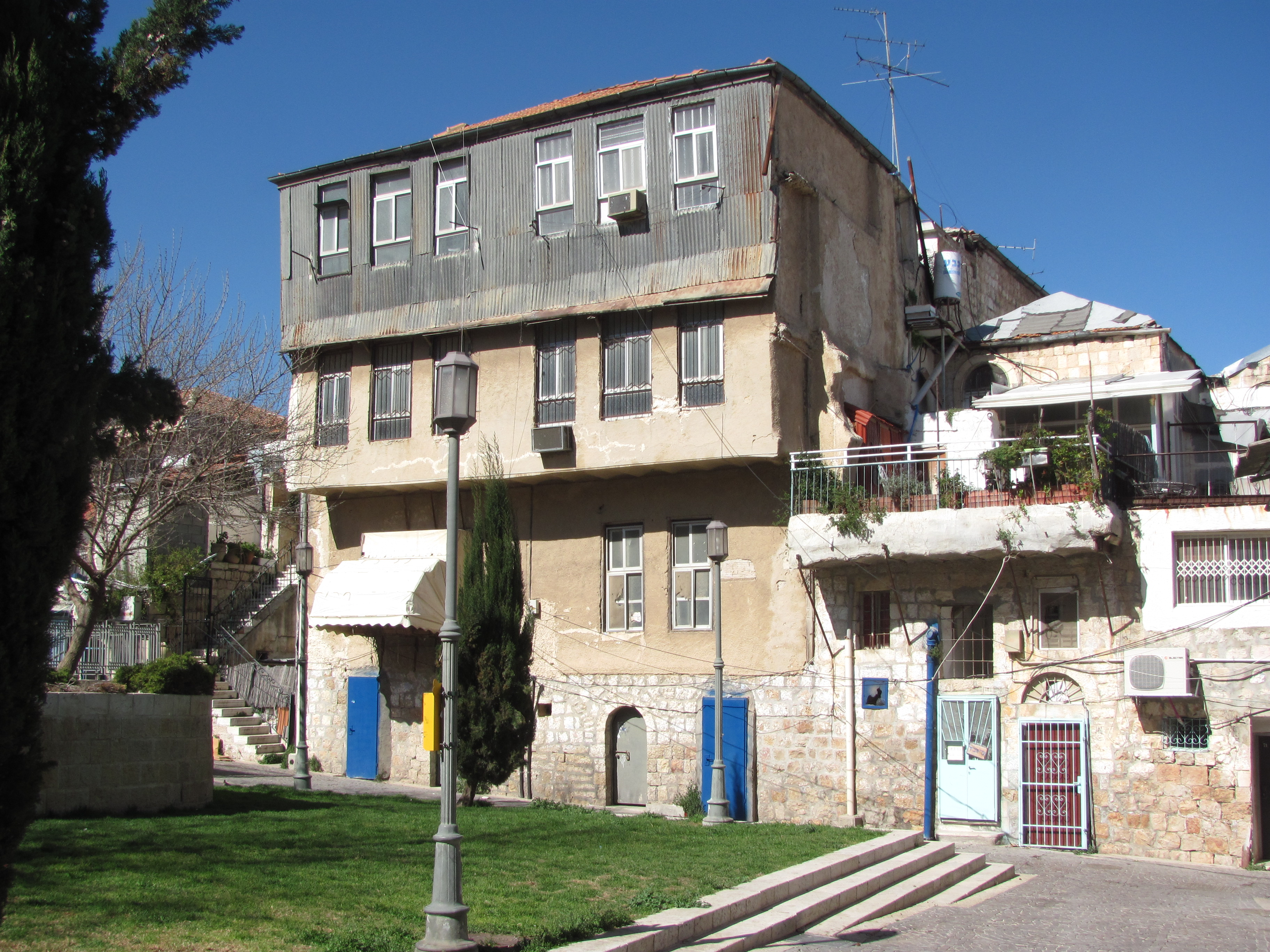
Rebecca Levy House (left) in Even Yisrael

Built in 1875, the Even Yisrael neighborhood was the sixth Jewish neighborhood to be established outside the Old City walls. It was constructed by the same company that built the nearby Mishkenot Yisrael neighborhood the same year. The land was purchased from the Arabs of Lifta.

The neighborhood had a typical open court construction, with row houses surrounding the central courtyard on all four sides of a rectangle. This building plan was intended to increase security and defensiveness. Arched gateways were installed on the north and south. Over time, additional gateways were opened to the east and west, reaching a total of six.

The neighborhood was planned for 53 apartment units, with a cistern, mikveh, and communal oven in the central courtyard. Each home was fronted by a small courtyard containing a kitchen and covered dining area. A cellar underneath each home was used to store coal, wine, and sesame oil.

Unlike its sister project, Mishkenot Yisrael, which featured standard two-room dwellings for a mainly low-income residential base, Even Yisrael featured both two-room dwellings and a handful of three- to four-room dwellings for families of means. A three-story house on the north side of the courtyard was the home of the widow Rebecca Levy, an American millionairess. It has been called "Jerusalem's first skyscraper". The third floor of this house was covered with tin sheeting to protect its inhabitants from the cold. Opposite the neighborhood, on the northern side of Jaffa Road, stood large gardens filled with plants and flowers.

== Population ==
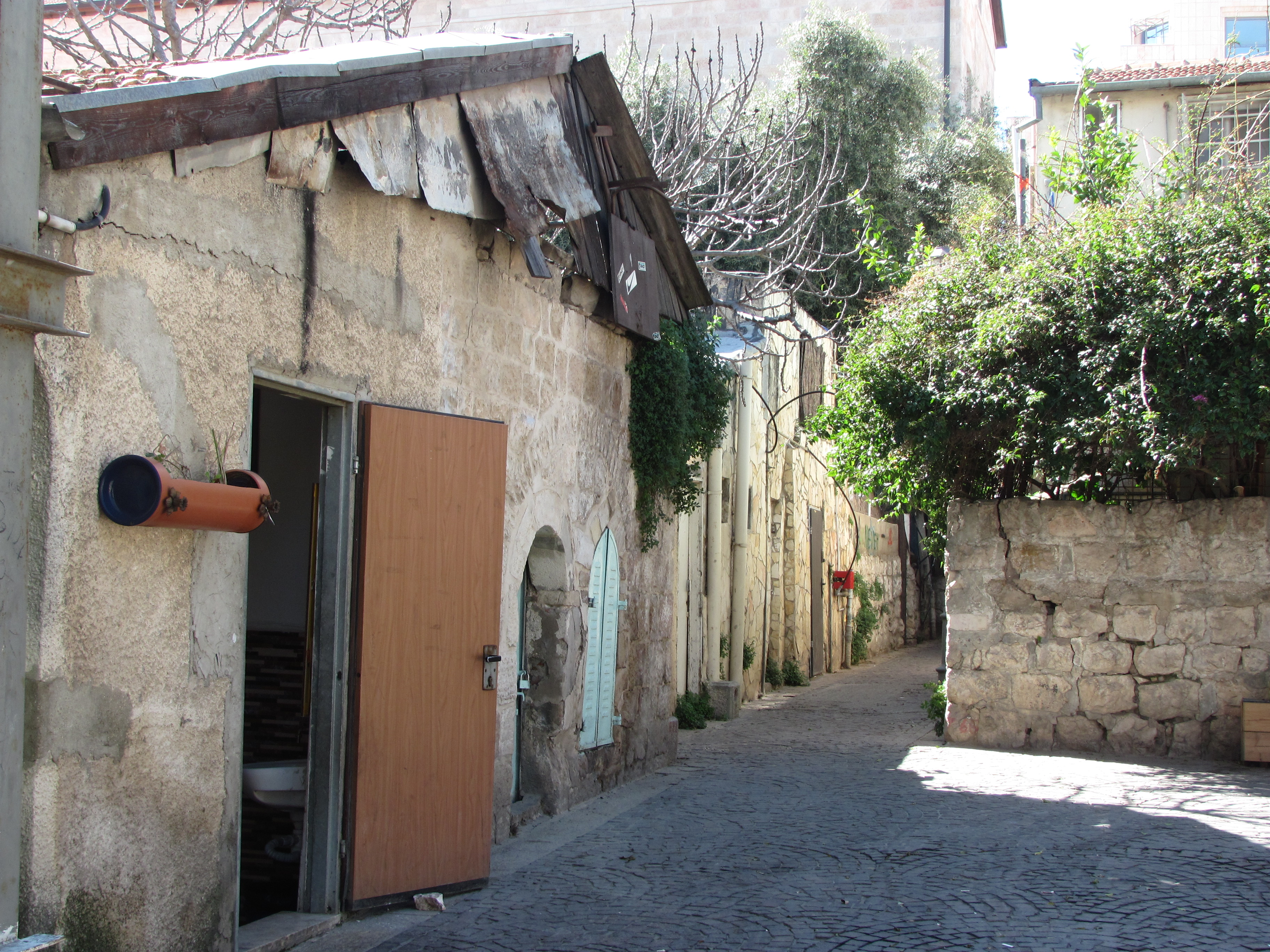
Row house, now a workshop

By the end of 1875, the neighborhood housed 45 residents, with a plan to build no less than six new apartments each year. An 1884 survey found 150 residents living in 30 apartments, while an 1897 survey reported the presence of 126 apartments. A 1916 government census reported a total of 152 apartments and 417 residents in Even Yisrael. In 1938 the neighborhood housed 450 residents.

Both Ashkenazi and Sephardi families lived in Even Yisrael. In the absence of a dedicated synagogue, prayer services were held in private homes or residents walked to the Beit Avraham synagogue in the nearby Mishkenot Yisrael neighborhood. In the 1880s one of the residents of Even Yisrael, Zvi Aryeh Lunsky Hacohen, gave over his home for a permanent synagogue for the Ashkenazi community; it was named Beit Zvi. Lunsky died in 1890. The two-room dwelling was eventually remodeled into one long hall and the entrance to the synagogue, originally located off the central courtyard, was moved to the opposite side, facing Agrippas Street.

In 1882 the Alliance Vocational School opened its campus to the west of the Even Yisrael neighborhood. In 1903 a tract of land between the Alliance school and Even Yisrael was earmarked for the construction of the Sephardi Orphanage under the guidance of Rabbi Yaakov Meir. In 1902 the Weingarten Orphanage for Girls opened in a building adjacent to Even Yisrael. In 1907, the Hotel Yarden opened in the Even Yisrael neighborhood, facing Jaffa Road.

== Renovation ==
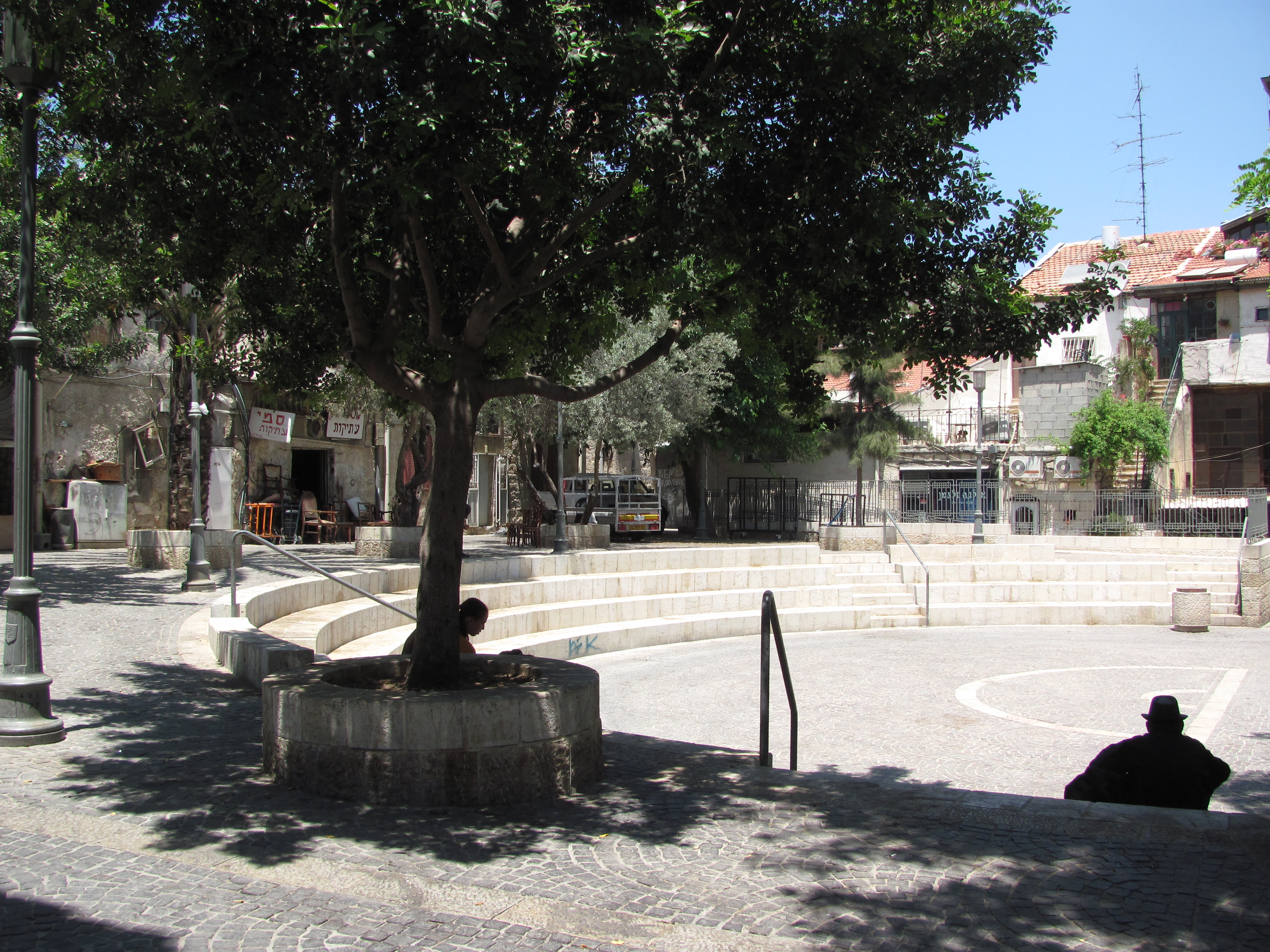
Amphitheater in the central courtyard

In his 1983 book Jerusalem Architecture, Periods and Styles: The Jewish quarters and public buildings outside the Old City walls, 1860–1914, Kroyanker reported that the Even Yisrael neighborhood, like other historic neighborhoods on Jaffa Road and Agrippas Street, was slated for demolition on the Jerusalem master plan. However, the row-house construction and the "complexities" of determining ownership made it difficult to take down individual homes. In the interim, the city imposed a moratorium on renovations, aside from sanitary improvements, in this and other historical neighborhoods; this created a situation in which building deterioration combined with illegal extensions and other structural changes on the part of residents.

Between 1992 and 2002 the Jerusalem Municipality developed a plan to preserve and renovate the Even Yisrael neighborhood, as well as convert the eastern part of Agrippas Street and Even Yisrael Street into pedestrian malls. Completed in 2004, the plan, designed by architect Yaakov Molcho, re-paved and re-landscaped the central courtyard of Even Yisrael, and added a small stone amphitheater for group tours and daytime passersby. Even Yisrael is now a popular attraction for tourists, tour groups, and local residents.

Today the neighborhood is part of the larger Nachlaot neighborhood, also known as Lev HaIr. In 2008 Lev HaIr installed an urban history project called "Pictures in Stone" in the Even Yisrael, Mazkeret Moshe, and Ohel Moshe neighborhoods. Historic photos and descriptions of the neighborhood’s early residents appear on plaques around the central courtyard of Even Yisrael. The plaques were supposed to be affixed to the houses themselves, as in the Ohel Moshe neighborhood, but residents protested that this placement would affect the resale value of their homes.

Some of the houses in Even Yisrael have been converted to workshops and galleries, but the neighborhood remains largely residential. The outside of the row houses facing Jaffa Road and Agrippas Street are occupied by commercial shops and eateries. Shops and restaurants also line the alleys to the east and west of the neighborhood; these include Arcadia, an upscale Israeli restaurant.

== Notable residents ==
Notable residents of Even Yisrael who contributed to the religious, cultural, and economic climate of Jerusalem in the late 19th and early 20th centuries include:

- Yaakov Shaul Elyashar, Sephardi Chief Rabbi of Palestine
- Abraham Moshe Luntz journalist and geographer
- Yechiel Michel Pines
- Yaakov Yehoshua, father of writer A. B. Yehoshua
- David Yellin

== Landmarks ==
- Beit Zvi synagogue (Nusach Ashkenaz), 24 Agrippas Street

== Even Yisrael Street ==
Even Yisrael Street was originally called Valero Street in the 1920s, in deference to Haim Aharon Valero, owner of land in this vicinity which was expropriated by the Jerusalem Municipality to facilitate the construction of King George Street. After 1948, the municipality renamed the street as Even Yisrael Street and affixed the Valero Street name to a small street in the Mahane Yehuda neighborhood. While the Valero family protested this renaming, its plea was not accepted.

== See also ==
- Expansion of Jerusalem in the 19th century

== Sources ==
- Bar-Am, Aviva (2007). Jerusalem EasyWalks (2nd ed.). ISBN 965-90048-6-9.
- Ben-Arieh, Yehoshua (1979). עיר בראי תקופה: ירושלים החדשה בראשיתה [A City Reflected in its Times: New Jerusalem – The Beginnings] (in Hebrew). Jerusalem: Yad Izhak Ben-Zvi Publications.
- Glass, Joseph P.; Kark, Ruth (2007). Sephardi Entrepreneurs in Jerusalem: The Valero Family 1800–1948. Gefen Publishing House Ltd. ISBN 9652293962.
- Kroyanker, David; Wahrman, Dror (1983). Jerusalem Architecture, Periods and Styles: The Jewish quarters and public buildings outside the Old City walls, 1860–1914. Jerusalem Institute for Israel Studies. ISBN 9652610194.
- Rossoff, Dovid (2001). Where Heaven Touches Earth: Jewish life in Jerusalem from medieval times to the present. Feldheim Publishers. ISBN 0-87306-879-3.
- Shwekey, Yitzchak; Yitzchaki, Dalia; Ginsburg, Michael, eds. (2015). "שכונת אבן ישראל" [Even Yisrael Neighborhood] (in Hebrew). Council for Conservation of Heritage Sites in Israel. Archived from the original on May 7, 2015.
- Wager, Eliyahu (1988). Illustrated Guide to Jerusalem. The Jerusalem Publishing House.
